= Political views of Adolf Hitler =

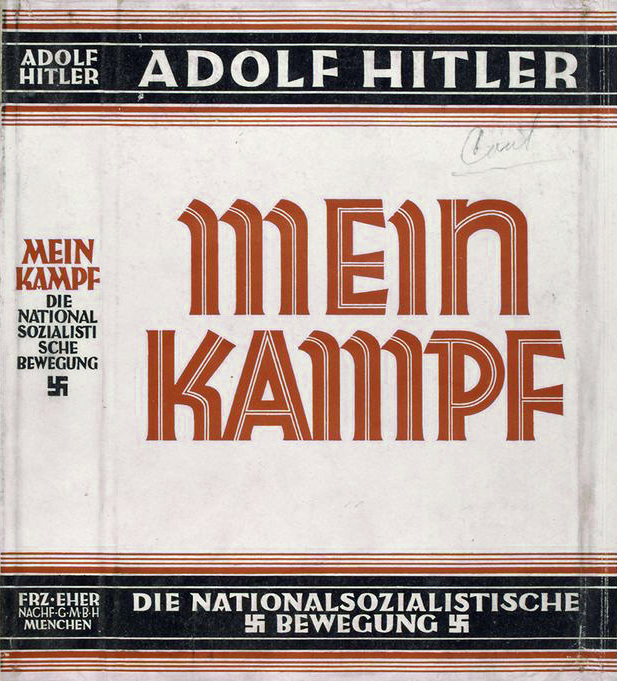
Hitler dictated his autobiographical political manifesto in Mein Kampf, published in 1925

The political views of Adolf Hitler, the dictator of Nazi Germany from 1933 to 1945, have presented historians and biographers with some difficulty. Adolf Hitler's writings and methods were often adapted to circumstance, although certain themes remained steady, including antisemitism, anti-communism, anti-Slavism, anti-parliamentarianism, German Lebensraum ('living space'), belief in the superiority of an Aryan race, and an extreme form of German nationalism. Hitler claimed he was fighting against Jewish Marxism. (Note: Hitler believed the Jewish people were "the plague of the world.")

Hitler's political views were formed during three periods; namely (1) his years as an impoverished young man in Vienna and Munich prior to the First World War, during which he turned to nationalist-oriented political pamphlets and antisemitic newspapers out of distrust for mainstream newspapers and political parties; (2) the closing months of the war, when the German Empire lost, and Hitler claimed to have developed his extreme nationalism and to have pledged to "save" Germany from external and internal enemies, who in his view had betrayed it (stab in the back myth); (3) and the 1920s, during which his early political career began and he wrote his autobiographical political manifesto Mein Kampf (lit. 'My Struggle'). Hitler formally renounced his Austrian citizenship on 7 April 1925, but did not acquire German citizenship until 1932, which enabled him to run for public office. Hitler was influenced by Benito Mussolini, who was appointed Prime Minister of Italy on 31 October 1922 after his March on Rome. (Note: Eberhard Jäckel's Hitler's Worldview: A Blueprint for Power offers an insightful account of Hitler's outlook, political philosophy included. Jäckel details the sophisticated and contradictory nature of Hitler's views, which he fashioned according to need on his path to power. According to Jäckel, the one thing that remained consistent throughout Hitler's life was his single-mindedness, even if it was derived from a lengthy synthesis "haphazardly" brought together; there can be no denying that Hitler possessed an "unusual programmatic mind", which was also "an unusual political force".) Hitler in many ways epitomised "the force of personality in political life" as described by historian Friedrich Meinecke. Hitler was essential to the political appeal and development of Nazism; so important were his views that they immediately affected the policies of Nazi Germany. He asserted the Führerprinzip ('leader principle'), which advocated the absolute obedience of all subordinates to their superiors; correspondingly, Hitler viewed himself at the top of both party and government in this structure.

Hitler firmly believed that the force of "will" was decisive in determining the political course for a nation and rationalised his actions accordingly. Given that Hitler was appointed "leader of the German Reich for life", he "embodied the supreme power of the state and, as the delegate of the German people"; it was his role to determine the "outward form and structure of the Reich". To that end, Hitler's political motivation was an ideology combining traditional German and Austrian antisemitism with an intellectualised racial doctrine resting on an admixture of social Darwinism and the ideas—mostly obtained second-hand and only partially understood—of philosophers Friedrich Nietzsche, Arthur Schopenhauer, Georges Sorel; racialist thinkers Hans F. K. Günther, Houston Stewart Chamberlain, Arthur de Gobineau, and Madison Grant; as well as Paul de Lagarde, Richard Wagner, Alfred Ploetz, among others.

== Pre-World War I ==
During his life in Vienna between 1907 and 1913, Hitler was exposed to racist rhetoric. Populists such as Mayor Karl Lueger exploited the city's prevalent antisemitic sentiment, blamed Jews "for simply anything and everything", (Note: Historian Peter Longerich described Lueger (along with Georg Ritter von Schönerer) as Hitler's potential "anti-Semitic mentors" but also points out how Hitler took a different approach "portraying his development into a radical anti-Semite as the result of personal experiences and as his ‘most difficult transformation’, lasting more than two years and a phase of ‘bitter internal struggle’".) and also espoused German nationalist notions for political benefit. German nationalist sentiments were widespread in the Mariahilf district of Vienna, where Hitler then lived. Hitler read local newspapers that promoted prejudice, along with pamphlets in relation to philosophers, theoreticians, and racialists such as Houston Stewart Chamberlain, Charles Darwin, Friedrich Nietzsche, Gustave Le Bon, and Arthur Schopenhauer.

Hitler developed fervent anti-Slavic sentiments during his life in Vienna. (Note: Historian John Connelly notes that when one "examines the early writings of Adolf Hitler... one finds few signs of intentions toward Slavs. Especially noticeable... is an absence of hostility toward Poles. If any Slavic people provoked Hitler's ill will it was the Czechs, about whom, he had formed opinions as a young man in Austria") He became strongly influenced by the ideas of Nordicist philosophers like Jörg Lanz von Liebenfels and Houston Stewart Chamberlain who promulgated the theory of "Aryan Herrenvolk" and advocated notions of racial superiority of Nordic peoples. These philosophers claimed that the "Aryan people" were facing dangerous threats from those whom they considered inferior, such as Jews and Slavs. They further advocated for implementing what they regarded as "racial purity", arguing that it was necessary for the survival of Nordic peoples in the modern world, while also denouncing communism. Hitler was also influenced by the Austrian politician Georg Ritter von Schönerer, a radical pan-Germanic nationalist who campaigned for the incorporation of Austria into the German Empire and fervently denounced the Jewish and Slavic minorities living in the Austro-Hungarian Empire. British historian Alan Bullock wrote about Hitler’s distaste for the Austro-Hungarian Empire and the mixture of the different ethnic groups living in it:

Hitler, of course, was a German, but he was born a subject of the Habsburg Empire, where Germans had played the leading role for centuries. However, with Bismarck's creation in the 1860s of a German Empire based on Prussia, from which the Austrian Germans were excluded, the latter found themselves forced to defend their historic claim to rule against the growing demands for equality of the Czechs and the other "subject peoples".

During his time in Vienna, Hitler also became vehemently opposed to ideas of social democracy. Earlier, he had a favourable opinion of the social democratic party, since he viewed them as a political faction that could facilitate the collapse of the Habsburg rule, which he regarded as being too pro-Slavic and anti-German. Hitler regarded Slavs as inferior people who were incapable of political organising skills (Note: According to reports from Baldur von Schirach, Hitler once tellingly remonstrated him in April 1943 at Berchtesgaden for suggesting that it might benefit the Nazis more if Ukraine governed itself, to which Hitler exclaimed, "Please do not speak, Schirach, about matters that do not concern you. The Slavs are utterly incapable of governing themselves". Original From: Baldur von Schirach, Ich glaubte an Hitler (Hamburg, 1967), pp. 290–291.) and saw them as the biggest threat to the pan-Germanic movement. Hitler eventually turned against the social democrats for their policy of accepting non-German-speaking members within their ranks. Describing his experience with the social democrats he encountered in Vienna, Hitler wrote in his autobiographical political manifesto Mein Kampf:

"What most repelled me was its hostile attitude toward the struggle for the preservation of Germanism, its disgraceful courting of the Slavic 'comrade,’ who accepted this declaration of love in so far as it was bound up with practical concessions, but otherwise maintained a lofty and arrogant reserve, thus giving the obtrusive beggars their deserved reward."

== Army intelligence agent ==
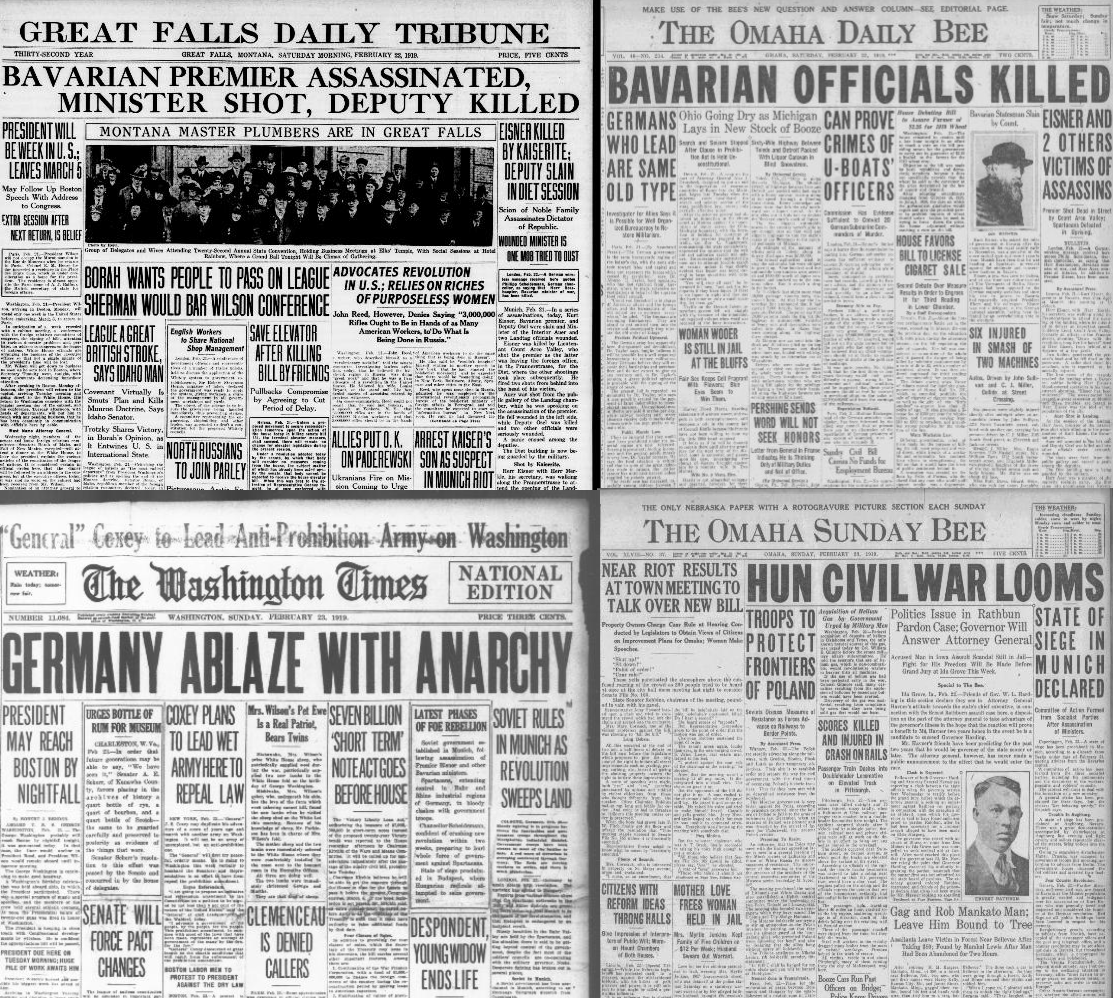
News coverage of the February 1919 unrest in Germany, as reported by several newspapers in the United States

During the First World War, Hitler was temporarily blinded in a mustard gas attack on 15 October 1918, for which he was hospitalised in Pasewalk. While there, Hitler learned of Germany's defeat, with the armistice to take effect on 11 November. By his own account, upon receiving this news, he suffered a second bout of blindness. Days after digesting this traumatic news, Hitler later stated his decision: "... my own fate became known to me ... I ... decided to go into politics." On 19 November 1918 Hitler was discharged from Pasewalk and returned to Munich, which at the time was in a state of socialist upheaval. Arriving on 21 November, he was assigned to the 7th Company of the 1st Replacement Battalion of the 2nd Infantry Regiment. In December he was reassigned to a prisoner-of-war camp in Traunstein as a guard. There he would stay until the camp was decommissioned in January 1919. (Note: Guard duty at a POW camp to the East, near the Austrian border. The prisoners were Russian, and Hitler had volunteered for the posting.)

Returning to Munich, Hitler spent a few months in barracks waiting for reassignment. During this time Munich was a part of the recently proclaimed socialist People's State of Bavaria, which was in a state of chaos with a number of assassinations occurring, including that of Kurt Eisner, (Note: As a socialist journalist, Eisner had organised the Socialist Revolution that overthrew the Wittelsbach monarchy in Bavaria in November 1918, which had led to his being described as "the symbol of the Bavarian revolution".) the socialist Minister President of Bavaria who was shot dead in Munich by a German nationalist on 21 February 1919. Other acts of violence were the killings of both Major Paul Ritter von Jahreiß and the conservative MP Heinrich Osel. Eventually, on 6–7 April 1919, communists and anarchists declared a Bavarian Soviet Republic, forcing the previous socialist government to flee, and Berlin sent in the military to suppress it. During that time, Hitler was elected twice as the liaison of his military battalion—once on 3 April, before the proclamation of the Soviet Republic, and again after it, on 15 April. When an attempt was made on 13 April to overthrow the Soviet government and restore the previous socialist government, Hitler allegedly urged his unit to stay out of the fighting instead of defending what he called "a gang of vagrant Jews", although this anecdote may be apocryphal. The Bavarian Soviet Republic was officially crushed on 6 May 1919, when Lt. General Burghard von Oven and his military forces declared the city secure. In the aftermath of arrests and executions, Hitler denounced a fellow liaison, Georg Dufter, as a Soviet "radical rabble-rouser." Other testimony he gave to the military board of inquiry allowed them to root out other members of the military that "had been infected with revolutionary fervor." For his anti-communist views he was allowed to avoid discharge when his unit was disbanded in May 1919.

In June 1919 he was moved to the demobilisation office of the 2nd Infantry Regiment. (Note: Toland suggests that Hitler's assignment to this department was partially a reward for his "exemplary" service in the front lines, and partially because the responsible officer felt sorry for Hitler as having no friends, but being very willing to do whatever the army required.) Around this time the German military command released an edict that the army's main priority was to "carry out, in conjunction with the police, stricter surveillance of the population ... so that the ignition of any new unrest can be discovered and extinguished." In May 1919 Karl Mayr became commander of the 6th Battalion of the guards regiment in Munich and from 30 May the head of the "Education and Propaganda Department" (Dept Ib/P) of the Bavarian Reichswehr, Headquarters 4. In this capacity as head of the intelligence department, Mayr recruited Hitler as an undercover agent in early June 1919. Under Captain Mayr "national thinking" courses were arranged at the Reichswehrlager Lechfeld near Augsburg, with Hitler attending from 10 to 19 July 1919. During this time Hitler so impressed Mayr that he assigned him to an anti-bolshevik "educational commando" as one of 26 instructors in the summer of 1919. (Note: Apparently someone in an army "educational session" had made a remark that Hitler deemed "pro-Jewish" and Hitler reacted with characteristic ferocity. Shirer states that Hitler had attracted the attention of a right-wing university professor who was engaged to educate enlisted men in "proper" political belief, and that the professor's recommendation to an officer resulted in Hitler's advancement. "I was offered the opportunity of speaking before a larger audience; and ... it was now corroborated: I could 'speak.' No task could make me happier than this; ... I was able to perform useful services to ... the army. ... [I]n ... my lectures I led many hundreds ... of comrades back to their people and fatherland.")

These courses he taught helped to popularise the notion that there was a scapegoat responsible for the outbreak of war and Germany's defeat. Hitler's own bitterness over the collapse of the war effort also began to shape his ideology. Like other German nationalists, he believed the Dolchstoßlegende ('stab-in-the-back myth') which claimed that the German Army, "undefeated in the field", had been "stabbed in the back" on the home front by civilian leaders and Marxists, later dubbed the "November criminals". "International Jewry" was described as a scourge composed of communists relentlessly destroying Germany. Such scapegoating was essential to Hitler's political career and it seems that he genuinely believed that Jews were responsible for Germany's post-war troubles. (Note: More than that, Hitler thought the Jews were a problem for the entire world and their elimination essential to survival.)

The origin and development of Hitler's antisemitism remain a matter of debate. His friend August Kubizek claimed that Hitler was a "confirmed anti-Semite" before he left Linz. However, historian Brigitte Hamann described Kubizek's claim as "problematical". While Hitler asserted in his autobiographical manifesto "Mein Kampf" that he had first become an antisemite in Vienna, Reinhold Hanisch, who helped him sell his paintings, disagreed with that assertion. Hitler had dealings with Jews while living in Vienna. Historian Richard J. Evans stated that "historians now generally agree that his notorious, murderous anti-Semitism emerged well after Germany's defeat [in World War I], as a product of the paranoid "stab-in-the-back" explanation for the catastrophe".

In July 1919 Hitler was appointed Verbindungsmann ('intelligence agent') of an Aufklärungskommando ('reconnaissance commando') of the Reichswehr, both to influence other soldiers and to infiltrate the German Workers' Party (DAP). Much like the political activists in the DAP, Hitler blamed the loss of the war on Jewish intrigue at home and abroad, espousing völkisch-nationalist political beliefs with the intention of resurrecting Germany's greatness by smashing the Versailles Treaty. Along those lines, Hitler proclaimed that the "German yoke must be broken by German iron" (Das deutsche Elend muß durch deutsches Eisen zerbrochen werden).

== Nazi Party ==
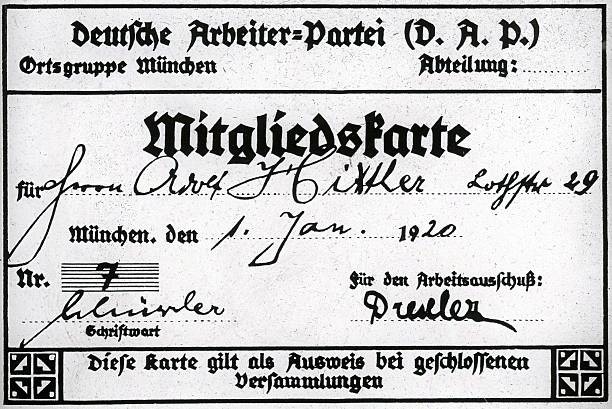
Hitler's membership card for the German Workers' Party

In September 1919, Hitler wrote what is often deemed his first antisemitic text, requested by Mayr as a reply to an inquiry by Adolf Gemlich, who had participated in the same "educational courses" as Hitler. In this report, Hitler argued for a "rational anti-Semitism" which would not resort to pogroms, but instead "legally fight and remove the privileges enjoyed by the Jews as opposed to other foreigners living among us. Its final goal, however, must be the irrevocable removal of the Jews themselves". Most people at the time understood this as a call for forced expulsion. Europe has a long history of expelling Jews and the auto-da-fé of the Inquisition. (Note: For more on European conceptions about the Jews, see the two chapters, "The Jews: Myth and Counter-Myth", and "Infected Christianity" in Toward the Final Solution: A History of European Racism by George Mosse.)

While he studied the activities of the German Workers' Party (DAP), Hitler became impressed with founder Anton Drexler's antisemitic, nationalist, anti-capitalist and anti-Marxist ideas. Drexler especially admired Hitler's oratory skills and invited him to join the DAP on 12 September 1919. On the orders of his army superiors, Hitler applied to join the party and within a week was accepted as party member 555 (the party began counting membership at 500 to give the impression they were a much larger party). In Mein Kampf, Hitler later claimed to be the seventh party member, one of many myths in Mein Kampf designed, as biographer Ian Kershaw writes, "to serve the Führer legend".

Hitler was discharged from the army on 31 March 1920 and began working full-time for the party. Displaying his talent for oratory and propaganda skills, with the support of Drexler, Hitler became chief of propaganda for the party in early 1920. When early party members promulgated their 25-point manifesto on 24 February 1920 (co-authored by Hitler, Anton Drexler, Gottfried Feder and Dietrich Eckart), it was Hitler who penned the first point, revealing his intention to unify German-speaking peoples, claiming that the party demanded "all Germans be gathered together in a Greater Germany on the basis of the right of all peoples to self-determination". By the spring of 1920, he engineered the change of name to the National Socialist German Workers' Party (NSDAP), commonly known as the Nazi Party. Under his influence, the party adopted a modified swastika, a well-known good luck charm that had previously been used in Germany as a mark of volkishness and "Aryanism", along with the Roman salute used by Italian fascists. (Note: For a comprehensive analysis of this salute, see: Allert, Tilman. The Hitler Salute: On the Meaning of a Gesture. Henry Holt and Company, 2009.) At this time, the Nazi Party was one of many small extremist groups in Munich, but Hitler's vitriolic beer hall speeches began attracting regular audiences. He became adept at using populist themes, including the use of scapegoats, who were blamed for his listeners' economic hardships. He gained notoriety for his rowdy polemic speeches against the Treaty of Versailles, rival politicians and especially against Marxists and Jews. Hitler used personal magnetism, charismatic authority, and an understanding of crowd psychology to his advantage while speaking in public.

While Hitler and Eckart were on a fundraising trip to Berlin in June 1921, a mutiny broke out within the Nazi Party in Munich. Members of its executive committee wanted to merge with the rival German Socialist Party (DSP). Hitler returned to Munich on 11 July and angrily tendered his resignation. The committee members realised that the resignation of their leading public figure and speaker would mean the end of the party. Hitler announced he would rejoin on the condition that he replace Drexler as party chairman and that the party headquarters remain in Munich. They capitulated to Hitler's demand and on 29 July 1921, a special congress was convened to formalise Hitler as the new chairman (the vote was 543 for Hitler and one against).

Hitler asserted the Führerprinzip ('leader principle'). The principle relied on absolute obedience of all subordinates to their superiors as he viewed the party structure and later the government structure as a pyramid, with himself—the infallible leader—at the apex. Rank in the party was not determined by elections—positions were filled through appointment by those of higher rank, who demanded unquestioning obedience to the will of the leader.

Early followers of the party included Rudolf Hess, Hermann Göring (command of the Sturmabteilung (SA) as Oberster SA-Führer in 1923), Ernst Röhm (later head of the SA), Alfred Rosenberg (prominent racial theorist), Gregor Strasser, Dietrich Eckart (a key founder of the party), Hermann Esser, Ludwig Maximilian Erwin von Scheubner-Richter and Erich Ludendorff (Field-Marshal who was the party's candidate for President of the Republic in 1925).

== Beer Hall Putsch ==
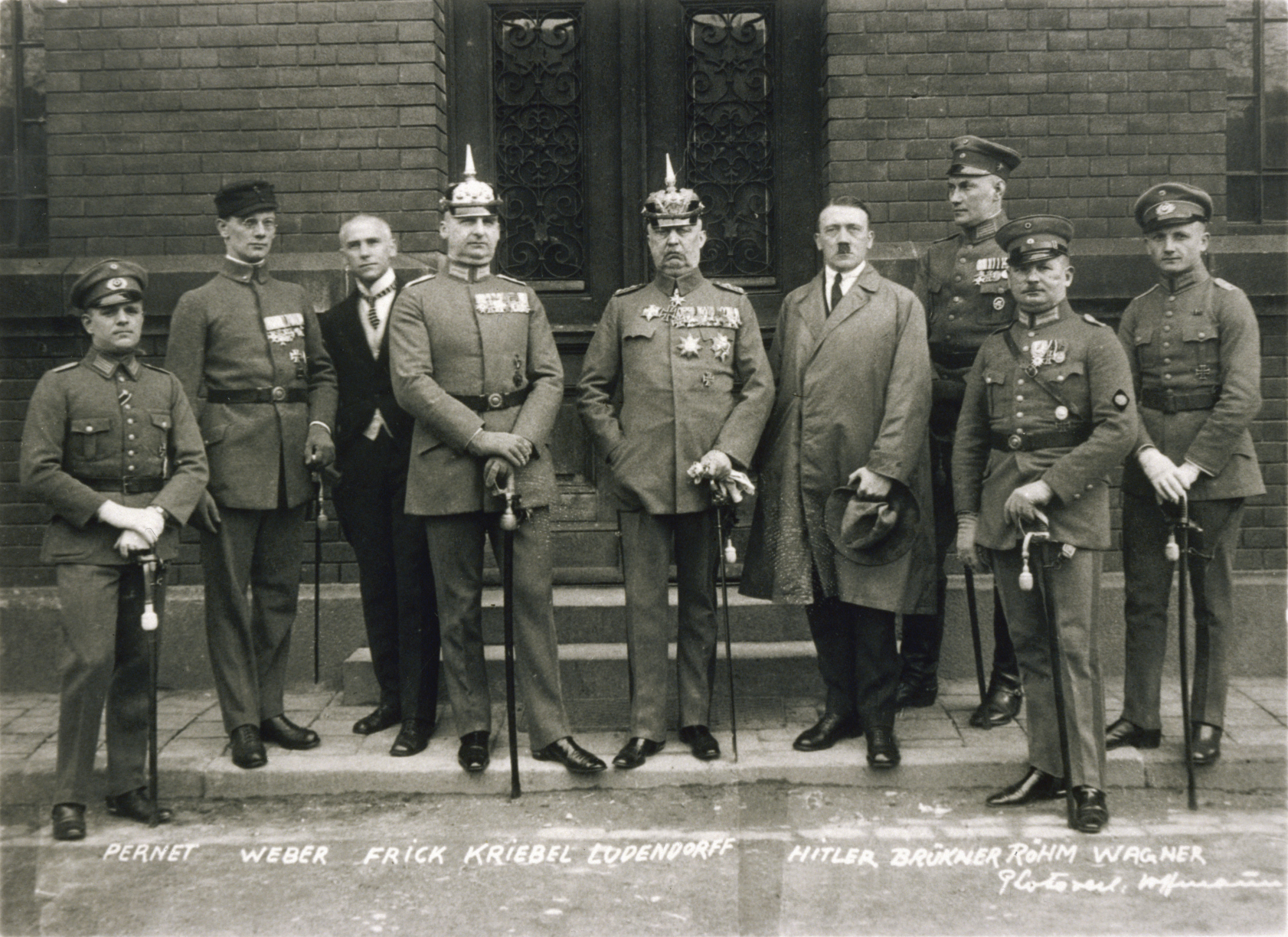
Defendants in the Beer Hall Putsch trial

Hitler enlisted the help of World War I General Ludendorff to try to seize power in Munich (the capital of Bavaria) in an attempt later known as the Beer Hall Putsch of 8–9 November 1923. This would be a step in the seizure of power nationwide, overthrowing the Weimar Republic in Berlin. On 8 November, Hitler's forces initially succeeded in occupying the local Reichswehr and police headquarters; however, neither the army nor the state police joined forces with him. The next day, Hitler and his followers marched from the beer hall to the Bavarian War Ministry to overthrow the Bavarian government on their "March on Berlin". Hitler wanted to emulate Benito Mussolini's March on Rome (1922) by staging his own coup in Bavaria to be followed by a challenge to the government in Berlin. However, the Bavarian authorities ordered the police to stand their ground. The forces of the putsch were dispersed after a short firefight in the streets near the Feldherrnhalle. In all, sixteen Nazi members and three police officers were killed in the failed coup.

Hitler fled to the home of Ernst Hanfstaengl and by some accounts contemplated suicide, although this state of mind has been disputed. Hitler was depressed but calm when he was arrested on 11 November 1923. Fearing "left-wing" members of the Nazi Party might try to seize leadership from him during his incarceration, Hitler quickly appointed Alfred Rosenberg as the party's temporary leader.

== Mein Kampf ==
Beginning in February 1924, Hitler was tried for high treason before the special People's Court in Munich. He used his trial as an opportunity to spread his message throughout Germany. At one point during the trial, Hitler discussed political leadership, during which he stated that leading people was not a matter of political science (Staatswissenschaft) but an innate ability, one of statecraft (Staatskunst). He further elaborated by claiming that out of 10,000 politicians, only one, Otto von Bismarck, emerged, subtly implying that he too had been born with this gift. Continuing, he declared that it was not Karl Marx who stirred the masses and ignited the Russian Revolution, but Vladimir Lenin, by making his appeal to the senses rather than the mind.

Hitler's speeches during the trial made him famous, but they did not exonerate him. In April 1924, he was sentenced to five years' imprisonment in Landsberg Prison, where he received preferential treatment from sympathetic guards and received substantial quantities of fan mail, including funds and other forms of assistance. During 1923 and 1924 at Landsberg, he dictated the first volume of Mein Kampf (My Struggle) to his deputy Rudolf Hess. Originally titled Four and a Half Years of Struggle against Lies, Stupidity, and Cowardice, his publisher shortened the title to Mein Kampf.

The book, dedicated to the Thule Society member Dietrich Eckart, was an autobiography and exposition of his ideology. In Mein Kampf, Hitler speaks at length about his youth, his early days in the Nazi Party and general ideas on politics, including the transformation of German society into one based on race, with some passages implying genocide. Published in two volumes in 1925 and 1926, it sold 228,000 copies between 1925 and 1932. In 1933, Hitler's first year in office, 1,000,000 copies were sold. The book acts as a reference, giving insight into the world view from which Hitler never wavered throughout his life.

In Mein Kampf, Hitler states that he had little interest in politics as a child, aspiring instead to become a painter. Like other boys in his part of Austria, he was attracted to pan-Germanism, but his intellectual pursuits were generally those of a dilettante. Hitler portrays himself as a born leader interested in knightly adventures and exploration. By the time he was 11, Hitler was a nationalist and interested in history. (Note: Historian Sebastian Haffner claims that at the basest or lowest of levels, Hitler's philosophical "bedrock" was a fusion of "nationalism and anti-Semitism.")

Hitler never finished his primary schooling, dropping out by the time he was 16. He devoted his attention instead to his artistic pursuits, which led him to move to Vienna in 1905. Hitler was later to proclaim that he learned some hard lessons in Vienna, namely that life was a critical struggle between the weak and the strong; in Hitler's worldview, morality did not matter, and everything simply boiled down to "victory and defeat".

While Hitler was incarcerated at the Landsberg prison writing Mein Kampf, he had routine visits from the respected First World War veteran, Major General Dr Karl Haushofer, who was the chair of the military science and geography department at LMU Munich. These meetings consisted of lectures and academic briefings on geopolitics, most certainly covering the Nazi ideal of Lebensraum and which likely influenced the views Hitler laid out in Mein Kampf. Haushofer espoused the theory that Germany was defeated in World War I by lack of sufficient space and autarchy. More importantly, Haushofer believed that nations which rested their power upon command of the sea and maritime trade routes were doomed to fail, since any such control "would soon be broken", writing that human history stood "at the great turning-point in the favourable position of the island empires". Hitler believed that for Germany to expand its influence, it would have to rely on continental space and abundant arable soil, which could only be found eastward.

Haushofer was a major influence on Hitler's conception of Lebensraum. Influenced by Haushofer's theories, Hitler believed it was Germany's right to seize the cultivatable land in Russia, since the earth belonged to those people willing to till it "industriously". Describing the Russians in the harshest of terms while intimating that the German people were more deserving by virtue of their alleged superior intellect, Hitler stated: "It is criminal to ask an intelligent people to limit its children in order that a lazy and stupid people next door can literally abuse a gigantic surface of the earth". Presaging this Nazi goal, Hitler wrote in Mein Kampf: "Without consideration of traditions and prejudices, Germany must find the courage to gather our people and their strength for an advance along the road that will lead this people from its present restricted living space to new land and soil, and hence also free it from the danger of vanishing from the earth or of serving others as a slave nation". In this sense, social Darwinism and geography were merged in Hitler's mind.

Many historians contend that Hitler's essential character and political philosophy can be discovered in Mein Kampf, which according to Sherratt was intentional, despite its autobiographical disposition. Historian James Joll once claimed that Mein Kampf constituted "all of Hitler's beliefs, most of his programme and much of his character". According to historian Andreas Hillgruber, evident within the text of Mein Kampf is nothing less than the very crux of Hitler's program. One of Hitler's foremost goals was that Germany should become "a World Power" on the geopolitical stage, or as he stated, "it will not continue to exist at all". Biographer Joachim Fest asserted that Mein Kampf contained a "remarkably faithful portrait of its author".

In Mein Kampf, Hitler categorised human beings by their physical attributes, claiming German or Nordic Aryans were at the top of the hierarchy, while assigning the bottom orders to Jews and Romani. Hitler claimed that dominated people benefit by learning from superior Aryans and said the Jews were conspiring to keep this "master race" from rightfully ruling the world by diluting its racial and cultural purity and exhorting Aryans to believe in equality rather than superiority and inferiority. Within Mein Kampf, Hitler describes a struggle for world domination, an ongoing racial, cultural and political battle between Aryans and Jews, the necessary racial purification of the German people and the need for German imperial expansion and colonisation eastwards. According to Hitler and other pan-German thinkers, Germany needed to obtain additional living space or Lebensraum which would properly nurture the "historic destiny" of the German people. This was a key idea he made central in his foreign policy.

Hitler wrote in Mein Kampf of his hatred of what he believed were the world's twin evils, namely communism and Judaism.

=== Philosophical influences ===
Despite any allusions otherwise, Hitler's engagement with the German philosophical canon was, in the main, a product of his confinement at Landsberg. According to his own later account, Hitler claimed to have read "everything he could get hold of" while there, but his comprehension of such reading merits questioning. Whatever its depth, it nourished a self-conception that he was the "philosopher leader" in whom the theoretician and the statesman were wedded—a conviction he carried out of prison and into public life. Upon his release from Landsberg, Hitler turned the reading into a component of his personal resume, name-dropping the canonical figures in order to present himself as an intellectual among politicians. He described this time spent reading as a substitute for the university education he had never received.

Hitler regularly borrowed phrases from Goethe and Schiller and, among the nineteenth-century philosophers, particularly from Schopenhauer and Nietzsche. It was Schopenhauer, whose works Hitler claimed to have carried throughout the First World War, that stood foremost in his professed admiration. Ernst Hanfstaengl nonetheless recalled the allegiance passing eventually to Nietzsche, and Hitler himself later judged Schopenhauer's pessimism "far surpassed" Nietzsche's. In many ways, Nietzsche reached Hitler through the hands of his sister Elisabeth, who selected, arranged, and published her brother's unfinished notes—among them reflections upon selective breeding and the rearing of a ruling caste. Historian Yvonne Sherratt contends that Hitler focused exclusively upon the militarist and antisemitic strands, while he more or less neglected the remainder of the content.

Beneath the canonical names of German philosophy lay a coarser stratum, which emerged in Hitler’s annotations, such as appeared in his copy of Paul de Lagarde's German Essays where he left a note at a passage on the supposed foreignness of the Jews. Additional favorites of Hitler included Julius Langbehn, who had hailed the notion of "blood and soil", as well as nationalist historian Heinrich von Treitschke and Oswald Spengler, both of whom he "read voraciously." Hiter's antisemitism was reinforced by the racialist writings of Hans F.K. Günther and J.F. Lehmann, while his military philosophy was shaped by the geopolitical ideals of Halford Mackinder.

Historians have been disposed to read Hitler’s engagement with these texts as instrumental to his political worldview. Magnus Brechtken, who co-directed the critical edition of Mein Kampf published by the Institut für Zeitgeschichte, characterized Hitler as "a summarizer and amalgamator" rather than an original thinker, his philosophical references serving chiefly as an instrument for repeating core assumptions. When it came to worldview, Hitler wrote—in Weir's rendering—that everything was to be "measured and used or discarded according to its utility." This interpretation is consistent with Hans Mommsen's verdict of Hitler's "eclectic superficiality", though Eberhard Jäckel and others have argued for the coherence of the whole. Hanfstaengl proposed that Hitler was "not so much a distiller as a bartender of genius", one who mixed the ingredients of German thought to the palate of his audience—wherein he located Hitler's originality in synthesis rather than comprehension.

== Völkisch nationalism ==
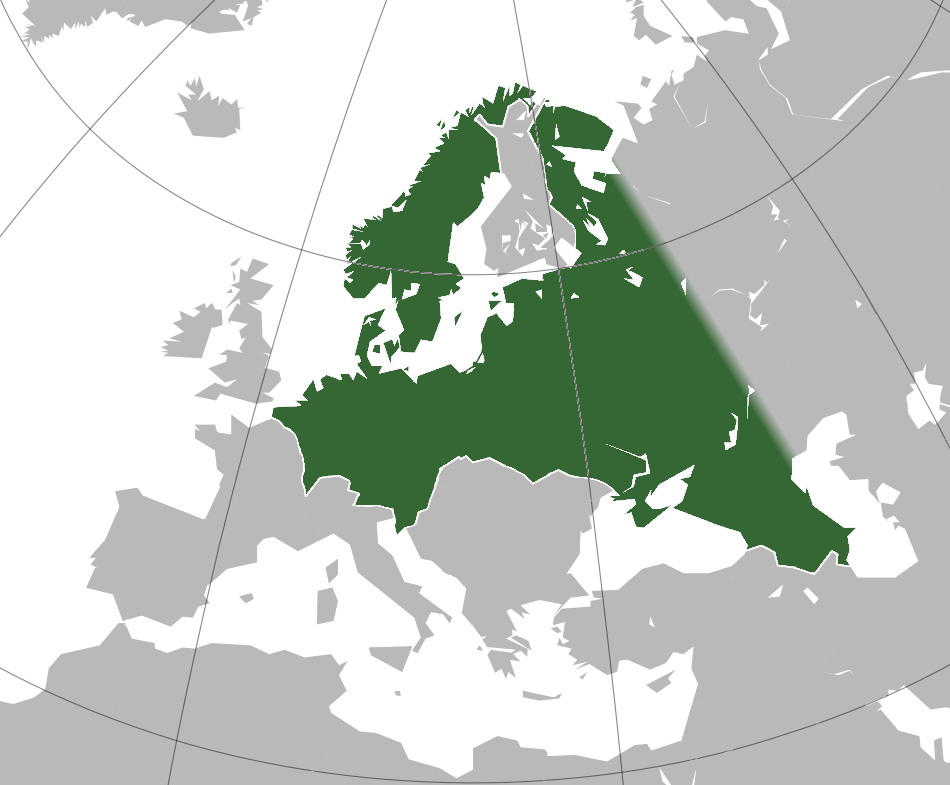
Boundaries of the Greater Germanic Reich

Hitler was a pan-Germanic nationalist whose ideology was built around a philosophically authoritarian, anti-Marxist, antisemitic and anti-democratic worldview. Such views of the world in the wake of the fledgling Weimar government were not uncommon in Germany since democratic/parliamentary governance seemed ineffectual to solve Germany's problems. Correspondingly, veterans of the First World War and like-minded nationalists formed the Vaterlandspartei which promoted expansionism, soldierly camaraderie and heroic leadership, all under the guise of völkisch traditions like ethnic and linguistic nationalism, but which also included obedience to authority as well as the belief in political salvation through decisive leadership. The völkisch parties began to fractionalise during Hitler's absence from the revolutionary scene in Germany after the failed "Beer Hall Putsch" of November 1923. When he re-emerged upon release from Landsberg Prison, his importance to the movement was obvious and he came to believe that he was the realisation of völkisch nationalistic ideals in a sort of near messianic narcissism which included his conviction to shake off the restrictive Treaty of Versailles and to "restore Germany's might and power", creating a reborn German nation as the chosen leader of the Nazi Party.

Hitler stressed the völkisch ideology, claiming Aryan superiority in Mein Kampf:

Every manifestation of human culture, every product of art, science and technical skill, which we see before our eyes today, is almost exclusively the product of the Aryan creative power. This very fact fully justifies the conclusion that it was the Aryan alone who founded a superior type of humanity; therefore he represents the archetype of what we understand by the term: MAN. He is the Prometheus of mankind, from whose shining brow the divine spark of genius has at all times flashed forth, always kindling anew that fire which, in the form of knowledge, illuminated the dark night by drawing aside the veil of mystery and thus showing man how to rise and become master over all the other beings on the earth. Should he be forced to disappear, a profound darkness will descend on the earth; within a few thousand years human culture will vanish and the world will become a desert.

The völkisch nationalism of Hitler and convinced Nazis encompassed the notion that the German Volk were epitomised by German farmers and peasants; people who remained uncorrupted by modern ideals and whose greatest attribute was their "cheerful subservience" and their capacity to respond to their "monarchical calling". Hitler was their new monarch in a manner of speaking. Völkisch nationalism also forged into its ideals, the importance of nature, the centrality of a knightly saviour (Hitler in this case) and the belief in the superior Aryan. Antisemitism remained a key component of the völkisch movement and a permanent undercurrent throughout conservative parties in German history and after many years culminated with the view that the Jews were the only thing standing in the way of the ideal society. As Germany's newfound völkisch nationalist leader, Hitler initiated a policy of ethnic nationalism replete with directives to eliminate Jews and other identified enemies as Nazism ultimately became the religion of the movement and the "irrational became concrete" under the terms of its "ideological framework".

Hitler was a Nordicist who was influenced by prior Aryanist tradition. Hitler's racial views were heavily influenced by Hans F. K. Günther, Houston Stewart Chamberlain, Arthur de Gobineau, and Madison Grant. Hitler referred to Grant's book The Passing of the Great Race as his "bible." Günther's Rassenkunde des deutschen Volkes (Racial Science of the German People) heavily influenced Hitler's racial policy and resulted in Günther's Nazi-backed attainment of a position in the anthropology department at the University of Jena in 1932 where Hitler attended Günther's inaugural lecture. Günther's theories gained such acclamation from Hitler that Hitler included his books as recommended reading material for the Nazi Party members.

== Social conservatism ==
Hitler and the Nazis promoted a socially conservative view concerning many aspects of life, supported by harsh discipline and a militaristic point of view. Conservative opinions about sexuality amid the Nazis led to extreme homophobia, which resulted in the systematic persecution of homosexuals. Hitler and his paladins also controlled what constituted acceptable artistic expression in Nazi Germany, abolishing what they considered to be "degenerate art". The Nazis strongly discouraged and in some cases outright rejected the following behaviors, namely the use of cosmetics, premarital sex, prostitution, pornography, sexual vices, smoking and excessive drinking. In many ways, there was a distinct anti-intellectualism present within Nazi philosophy. Hearkening back to a simpler time, Hitler and the Nazis attempted to vindicate the glorious past as the key to a more promising future.

Evidence of Hitler's disdain for Weimar's cultural and social decadence appears on multiple occasions in Mein Kampf. In his seminal tome, he expresses an ultraconservatism:

If we study the course of our cultural life during the last twenty-five years we shall be astonished to note how far we have already gone in this process of retrogression. Everywhere we find the presence of those germs which give rise to protuberant growths that must sooner or later bring about the ruin of our culture. Here we find undoubted symptoms of slow corruption; and woe to the nations that are no longer able to bring that morbid process to a halt.

Hitler raved against what he considered to be tasteless and morally destructive art on display throughout Germany in Mein Kampf, calling some of it morbid and declaring that "people would have benefited by not visiting them at all". Convinced that it was necessary to show the German people what comprised, "degenerate art" so as to protect them in the future, Hitler arranged for a formally commissioned exhibit in July 1937 of specially selected carvings, sculptures, and paintings. Once the exhibit was at an end, selected artists' works were banned from Nazi Germany.

Well known was Hitler's vehement opposition to racial-mixing. He was also a natalist as he believed, as did other pan-Germans, that Germans had an obligation to procreate:

That such a mentality [racial purity] may be possible cannot be denied in a world where hundreds and thousands accept the principle of celibacy from their own choice, without being obliged or pledged to do so by anything except an ecclesiastical precept. Why should it not be possible to induce people to make this sacrifice if, instead of such a precept, they were simply told that they ought to put an end to this truly original sin of racial corruption which is steadily being passed on from one generation to another. And, further, they ought to be brought to realize that it is their bounden duty to give to the Almighty Creator beings such as He himself made to His own image.

Another area of concern for Hitler and which was mentioned by his childhood companion in Vienna, August Kubizek, was prostitution. Hitler associated it with venereal disease and cultural decline. Moreover, Hitler found the practice counter to proper family development and displayed a puritanical view in Mein Kampf, writing:

Prostitution is a disgrace to humanity and cannot be removed simply by charitable or academic methods. Its restriction and final extermination presupposes the removal of a whole series of contributory circumstances. The first remedy must always be to establish such conditions as will make early marriages possible, especially for young men...

He goes on asserting that prostitution was dangerous and intimated much more significant, destructive socio-political implications. Once Hitler came to power, his regime moved against all forms of sexual deviations and sexual crimes, especially homosexuality, which was prosecuted as a crime as many as 30,000 times between 1934 and 1939. Hitler's social conservatism was so extreme towards homosexuals that he deemed them "enemies of the State" and grouped them in the same category as Jews and communists; a special department of the Gestapo (Secret State Police) was formed to deal with the matter.

Hitler's general perception about women was ultra-conservative and patriarchal, with their foremost task being a domestic one as a mother of children who worked contentedly at home, ensuring it remained clean and orderly. Meanwhile, it was the woman's role to educate her children to be conscious of their importance as Aryans and instill within them a commitment to their ethnic community. Consequently, Hitler believed women had no place in public or political life due to their differing nature from men. Like many Romantic artists, musicians, and writers, the Nazis valued strength, passion, frank declarations of feelings and deep devotion to family and community (with women being seen as the center of the family in Nazi Germany). (Note: Hitler had very clear ideas about the woman's role in the Nazi state - she was the centre of family life, a housewife and mother.) So great was Hitler's influence in all political aspects of social life that even education for children was subordinate to his opinion. Profoundly anti-intellectual and against conventional education for children, Hitler determined instead that training and education should be designed to create young German "national comrades" who were utterly convinced of their "superiority to others". Moreover, Hitler wanted to create young German soldiers who were willing to fight for their convictions so they were accordingly indoctrinated by Nazi propaganda, trained in military discipline and taught obedience to authority in the Hitler Youth.

== Contempt for democracy ==
Hitler blamed Germany's parliamentary government for many of the nation's ills. The Nazis and especially Hitler associated democracy with the failed Weimar government and the punitive Treaty of Versailles. Hitler often denounced democracy, equating it with internationalism. Since democratic ideals espoused equality for all men, it represented to Hitler and his Nazi ideologues the notion of mob rule and the hatred of excellence. Not only was democracy antithetical to their social-Darwinist abstractions, but its international-capitalist framework was considered an exclusively Jewish-derived conception. Hitler also thought democracy was nothing more than a preliminary stage of Bolshevism.

Hitler believed in the leader principle (hence his title, the Leader, der Führer) and considered it ludicrous that an idea of governance or morality could be held by the people above the power of the leader. Joachim Fest described a 1930 confrontation between Hitler and Otto Strasser as such: "Now Hitler took Strasser to task for placing 'the idea' above the Führer and wanting 'to give every party comrade the right to decide the nature of the idea, even to decide whether or not the Führer is true to the so-called idea.' That, he cried angrily, was the worst kind of democracy, for which there was no place in their movement. 'With us the Führer and the idea are one and the same, and every party comrade has to do what the Führer commands, for he embodies the idea and he alone knows its ultimate goal'". (Note: Democracy or more specifically "Germanic democracy", according to Hitler's deputy Rudolf Hess, consisted of "unconditional authority downwards, and responsibility upwards." This hierarchical image of democracy was anything but democratic in nomenclature and was most likely an ironic remark.)

Although Hitler realised that his ascension to power required the use of the Weimar Republic's parliamentary system (founded on democratic principles), he never intended for the continuation of democratic governance once in control. Contrarily, Hitler proclaimed that he would "destroy democracy with the weapons of democracy". The rapid transition made by the Nazis once they assumed control clearly reveals that Hitler succeeded in this regard. For the most part, democratic governance was never embraced by the German masses or by the elite. The ill-fated Weimar democracy's inability to provide economic relief to the German people during the Great Depression further enhanced its image as an ineffectual system of government amid the masses. Hitler offered people the prospect of a "new and better society". He exploited the conditions in Germany in the ultimate expression of political opportunism when he brought his dictatorial and totalitarian government to power and thereafter attempting to impose himself and his system upon the world in the process.

== Anti-communism ==
In Hitler's mind, communism was a major enemy of Germany, an enemy he often mentions in Mein Kampf. During the trial for his involvement in the Beer Hall Putsch, Hitler claimed that his singular goal was to assist the German government in "fighting Marxism". Marxism, Bolshevism, and communism were interchangeable terms for Hitler as evidenced by their use in Mein Kampf:

In the years 1913 and 1914 I expressed my opinion for the first time in various circles, some of which are now members of the National Socialist Movement, that the problem of how the future of the German nation can be secured is the problem of how Marxism can be exterminated.

Later in his seminal tome, Hitler advocated for "the destruction of Marxism in all its shapes and forms". According to Hitler, Marxism was a Jewish strategy to subjugate Germany and the world, as well as a mental and political form of slavery. From Hitler's vantage point, Bolsheviks existed to serve "Jewish international finance". When the British tried negotiating with Hitler in 1935 by including Germany in the extension of the Locarno Pact, he rejected their offer and instead assured them that German rearmament was important in safeguarding Europe against communism, a move which clearly showed his anti-communist proclivities. (Note: Later when the Nazi–Soviet agreement was made, otherwise known as the Molotov–Robbentrop Pact, the British were stunned. This surprising (and temporary) treaty was signed by the Nazis for the sake of geopolitical convenience. Germany's invasion of the Soviet Union dissolved its contents.)

In 1939, Hitler told the Swiss Commissioner to the League of Nations Carl Burckhardt that everything he was undertaking was "directed against Russia" and that "if those in the West are too stupid or too blind to understand this, then I shall be forced to come to an understanding with the Russians to beat the West, and then, after its defeat, turn with all my concerted force against the Soviet Union". When Hitler finally ordered the attack against the Soviet Union, it was the fulfillment of his ultimate goal and the most important campaign in his estimation, as it comprised a struggle of "the chosen Aryan people against Jewish Bolsheviks".

Biographer Alan Bullock avows Hitler "laid great stress" on the need to concentrate on a single enemy, an enemy he lumps together as "Marxism and the Jew". Shortly in the wake of the Commissar Order, a directive pursuant to the German invasion of the Soviet Union, SS Deputy Reinhard Heydrich informed the SS of Hitler's geopolitical philosophy which conflated Bolshevism and Jews, writing that "eastern Jewry is the intellectual reservoir of Bolshevism and in the Führer's view must therefore be annihilated". (Note: See: [DNA Nuremberg NO-4145/2 (deposition of Walter Blume 29 VI 47)]) Considering the eventual Nazi invasion of the Soviet Union (Operation Barbarossa), no additional inducements are really requisite concerning Hitler's hatred of communism, particularly since the Nazi persecution and extermination of these groups was not only systematic, but it was extensive both within Germany and only intensified in the occupied zones during the war under Hitler's leadership.

Because Nazism co-opted the popular success of socialism and Communism among working people while simultaneously promising to destroy Communism and offer an alternative to it, Hitler's anti-communist program allowed industrialists with traditional conservative views (tending toward monarchism, aristocracy and laissez-faire capitalism) to cast their lot with and help underwrite the Nazi rise to power. (Note: In the 1920s and 1930s, there was a fear among German industrialists, not wholly unfounded, that Germany would likely suffer an October-style Bolshevik revolution at some point and become a Soviet republic of the "World Soviet Federation" envisioned by international communists, unless drastic anti-communist measures were taken. For example, Fritz Thyssen, who had been arrested by German "Reds" in 1918, did not trust that the Weimar Republic would indefinitely succeed in fending off a Bolshevist-type revolution.) When asked in a 1923 interview why Hitler called himself a National Socialist when the Nazi Party was "the very antithesis of that commonly accredited to socialism", Hitler responded: "Socialism is the science of dealing with the common weal. Communism is not Socialism. Marxism is not Socialism. The Marxians have stolen the term and confused its meaning. I shall take Socialism away from the Socialists."

== Antisemitism, anti-slavism, Lebensraum, and the invasion of the Soviet Union ==
Antisemitism and anti-Slavism were central components in Adolf Hitler's Lebensraum settler-colonial programme, and constituted the ideological basis of the Nazi invasion of the Soviet Union. Hitler's push for eastward expansion ("Drang nach Osten") of German territories, outlined in "Mein Kampf", was driven significantly by his hatred and contempt of Slavs and Jews alike, both groups well-represented in the East. This contempt included the notion that the Slavs in particular, were manipulated by the Jews; Hitler being utterly convinced that the people of Soviet Russia were "controlled by Jews." (Note: Historian Alex J. Kay explicitly writes for the Nazis: "...Slavic peoples such as Czechs, Poles, Russians and others were in themselves primitive, backward and passive ‘sub-humans’ who posed a threat only when led by supposedly cunning and nefarious Jews — as in the case of the Bolsheviks, who were viewed by National Socialists as the stooges of ‘international Jewry’. In accordance with this way of thinking, Slavs were eminently expendable and formed a regional obstacle to the expansion of German power, but they did not constitute a real danger for the Germans as such. Jews, by contrast, were portrayed as the global enemy and a worldwide threat to the very existence of the German people. While the Slav masses were deemed fit, at best, for enslavement, the Nazis conferred agency on the Jews: they were the alleged leaders and revolutionaries pulling the strings behind the scenes.")

In this, Hitler exploited the historic Prussian and German revulsion against Slavs to ideologically defend his bio-political agenda to German audiences. There were also deeply antisemitic and anti-Slavic elements among German scholars, particularly by the twentieth-century concerning the need for Lebensraum, who opined that the vast natural resources of the East were "wasted on racially “inferior” peoples like Slavs and Jews". (Note: German historian Wolfgang Wippermann labelled the Nazi version of "Drang nach Osten" as a "Kontinuitätsbruch" (transl. "interruption of continuity"), noting that Hitler's irredentism radically exceeded the geo-strategic posture of preceding Prussian militarism and also had an explicitly "racial-biological" dimension.)

Historian Roderick Stackelberg contended that Hitler's invasion of the Soviet Union was the result of "mutually reinforcing ideological, racial, and geopolitical assumptions" that Hitler had plainly laid out in Mein Kampf. The German historian Andreas Hillgruber shared Stackelberg's view. In fact, Hillgruber encapsulates Hitler's political views (which drove German policy throughout his rule) in summary through the invasion of the Soviet Union. He places it within the context of Hitler's intent to create a continental Reich which included the destruction of the Jews. According to Hillgruber, Hitler had the following objectives in mind when he invaded the former Soviet Union:

1. The total eradication of all forms of "Judeo-Bolshevik" leadership, which encompassed its perceived biological roots, namely the millions of Jews occupying central and eastern Europe.
2. The requisite acquisition of Lebensraum or colonial space necessary for German settlement in the finest and most arable territories within Russia, or in those parts of Russia which provided political or strategic advantages in Hitler's mind.
3. The subjugation and decimation of the Slavic people, which was to be divided into four German territories or "Reich Commissariats" entitled Ostland, Ukraine, Moskovia and Caucasus, with each subordinated to German "viceroys". One of the principal aims of German leadership in these Reich Commissariats would be the cancellation of any semblance or memory of Russian statehood and the conditioning of these subordinated "states" to German mastery.
4. Ultimately, a "great space" autarchy in Continental Europe under German suzerainty would result, one capable of defeating any possible Allied blockade and for whom the vanquished eastern territories could provide a theoretically inexhaustible source of raw materials and food necessary for any protracted war against the Allied powers. The establishment of this "German Reich of the Germanic nation" also included in its planning to feed its soldiers off the Russian land, although that meant that "many millions of people will be starved to death", a directive already contemplated by the Economic Staff East no later than 2 May 1941.

Not alone in this interpretation of Hitler's invasion of the Soviet Union as a move of continental expansion and one with an antisemitic eliminationist political intent, Hillgruber is joined by the likes of historian Karl Dietrich Bracher, among others. (Note: Stackelberg claims Hitler's "attack on the Soviet Union was the fulfillment of the mission of his life.") In his work The German Dictatorship, Bracher called the invasion the consequence of Hitler's "ideological obsession" and stated that "Hitler's drive for territorial expansion and the relentless expansion of the SS state ushered in the final phase of National Socialist rule". That final phase proved disastrous for the Jews, Slavs, Roma-Sinti and countless others. (Note: Hitler's attempt to acquire Lebensraum eventually brought untold suffering to his beloved German Volksgenossen as the British and American bombers unleashed their wrath on German cities, demoralizing the German people. Meanwhile, the Red Army counter-attacked at Stalingrad late in 1942, reclaimed once German-occupied territory, and killed upwards of 500,000 German troops and their allies by February 1943; they also held captive some 91,000 prisoners—among them twenty-two German generals.)

== Intentionality vs. opportunism ==
Historians have long debated whether Hitler’s political views should be understood primarily as the expression of some fixed ideological intention or as a set of rhetorically adaptable positions subordinated to political circumstance; some situating Hitler's political views "in the tension between the doctrine of fixed beliefs" and the utilitarian ideals of "a pragmatic populism." Earlier historical interpretations often emphasized opportunism, portraying Hitler as a tactician who employed ideological flexibility to mobilize support, while downplaying the constraining influence of doctrine—especially the latter case, when traditional political conventions were foregone as subordinates dynamically worked "towards the Führer." To this end, historian Ian Kershaw argued that Hitler's authority operated through broad ideological signals that encouraged subordinates to anticipate his aims and translate them into policy without the need for detailed instruction, whereby Hitler became the "linchpin" for the Nazis’ entire system.

== The Holocaust ==
Among scholars of the Nazi era, Hitler's role and relationship to the regime and the Holocaust have been a source of consternation and acrimonious historiographical debate. Historian and biographer Ian Kershaw wrote that for historians Hitler was "unreachable" and that he was "cocooned in the silence of the sources". What Kershaw was referencing was the absence of any clear political directives accompanied by Hitler's signed authorisation (primary source documents) regarding the atrocities carried out by his Nazi underlings. Given the abounding circumstantial evidence in Hitler's speeches, writing in Mein Kampf, administrative meeting notes taken by subordinates and the recollections of those in or near his inner circle, it seems that his political intention was for Jews, Slavs and other "enemies" of the Nazi state to be persecuted without mercy in lieu of how gradual the process actually developed. A debate between two primary schools of thought emerged about Hitler's political role in Nazi policy and the Holocaust. One is termed intentionalist, represented by scholars who contend that virtually all Nazi policies (including the extermination of the Jews) were resultant from Hitler's desires; whereas the other school, entitled functionalist/structuralist, consists of scholars who see the intensification of Nazi persecution policies due to power struggles within the Nazi government as his minions attempted to "interpret" their master's wishes, often acting autonomously. (Note: For more on this debate, also see:Functionalism versus intentionalism. According to historian Richard Bessel, most academics studying Hitler and the Nazi regime have embraced and synthesized these once divergent schools of thought and now see the merit in both. Richard Bessel, "Functionalists vs. Intentionalists: The Debate Twenty Years on or Whatever Happened to Functionalism and Intentionalism?" German Studies Review 26, no. 1 (2003):15–20. JSTOR 1432899)

When it comes to the Holocaust itself and Hitler's politico-ideologocial intention, debates over intentionality have shifted away from questions of doctrinal coherence, instead focusing on the relationship between ideological orientation, the Führer's charismatic authority (particularly when "interpreted" by subordinates), and what historian Dirk Moses calls "cumulative radicalization." Building on this framework, Ian Kershaw emphasizes that Hitler's fixation on the "Jewish Question" functioned less as an exterminatory blueprint than as a legitimating horizon within which radical initiatives escalated. While Hitler's antisemitism remained indispensable in shaping the regime's aims, genocidal policy itself emerged through a dialectical process that linked ideological signals from above with institutional competition and anticipatory obedience from below; this allowed the "Final Solution" to develop cumulatively rather than via Hitler's direct control. Either way, antisemitism always constituted one of the most important aspects of Hitler's political views. Historian Peter Longerich writes: "There can be no doubt that Hitler's behaviour during his entire political career... was characterised by radical antisemitism". Correspondingly, Germanic cultural and racial purity remained paramount in his understanding of the world, having once exclaimed: "The greatest danger is and remains for us, the alien racial poison in our body. All other dangers are transitory". (Note: Also see: Klöss, Erhard, ed. Reden des Führers. Politik and Propaganda Adolf Hitlers, 1922–1945 (München: Deutscher Taschenbuch Verlag, 1967), 49. ASIN B0035ZBVNM)

Hitler wrote his first antisemitic letter to Adolf Gemlich on 16 September 1919 stating that Jews were a race and not a religious group and that the aim for the government "must unshakably be the removal of the Jews altogether". According to the journalist and retired major Josef Hell, Hitler told him in 1922 that: "Once I really am in power, my first and foremost task will be the annihilation of the Jews." Throughout Mein Kampf, Hitler employs biological crudity by describing the Jews as "parasites" or "vermin". Reflecting back on the beginning of the First World War, Hitler makes the eerily prescient statement that if "twelve or fifteen thousand of these Hebrew corrupters of the people had been held under poison gas, as happened to hundreds of thousands of our very best German workers in the field, the sacrifice of millions at the front would not have been in vain."

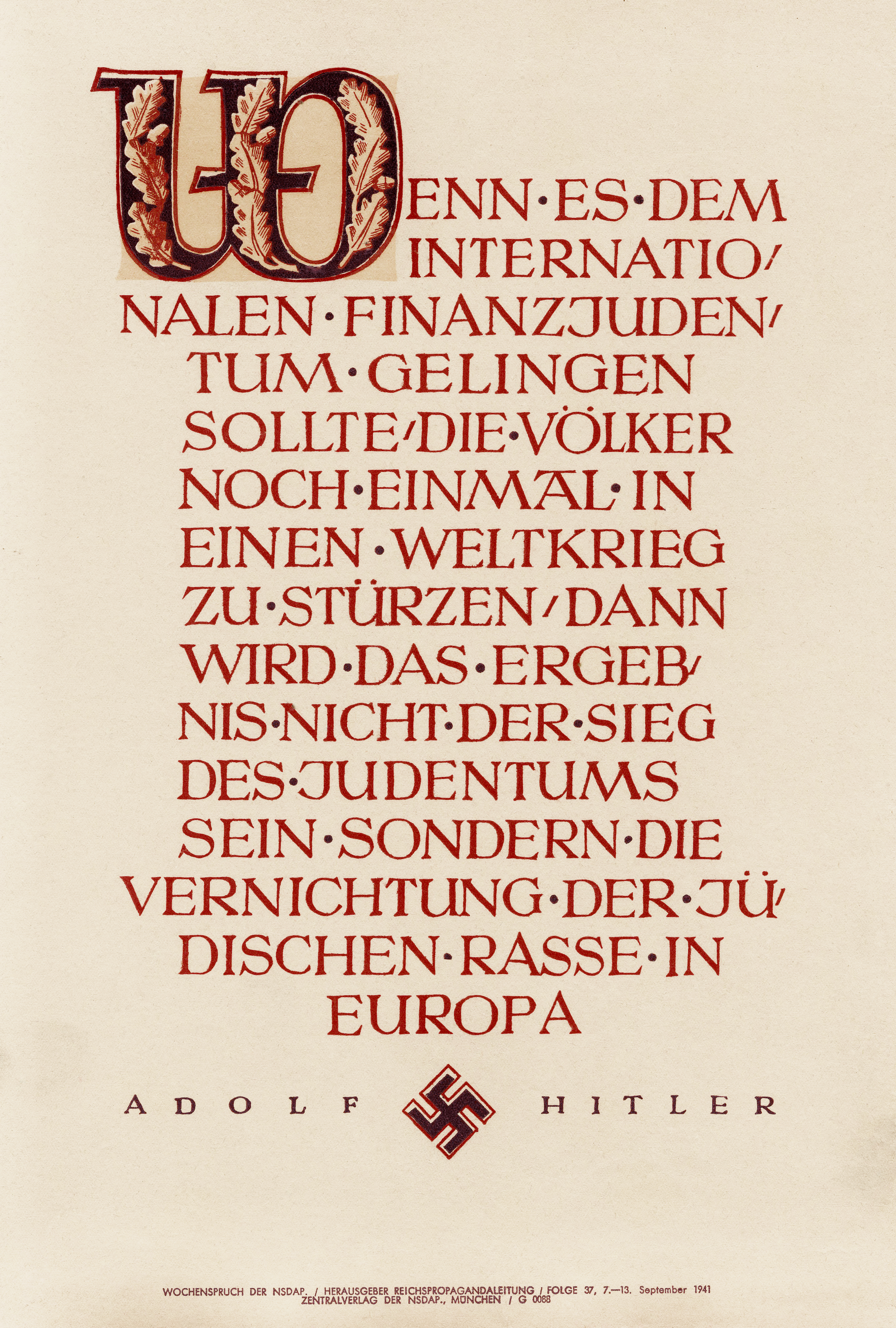
Wochenspruch der NSDAP, displayed 7–13 September 1941, quotes Hitler's prophecy of 30 January 1939.

Underlining the argument that Hitler had overt eliminationist intentions for the Jews is the "prophecy" quote from the 30 January 1939 Reichstag speech:

I want to be a prophet again today: if international finance Jewry in Europe and beyond should succeed once more in plunging the peoples into a world war, then the result will be not the Bolshevization of the earth and thus the victory of Jewry, but the annihilation of the Jewish race in Europe.

German historian Klaus Hildebrand insisted that Hitler's moral responsibility for the Holocaust was the culmination of his pathological hatred of the Jews and his ideology of "racial dogma" formed the basis of Nazi genocide. Historian David Welch asserts that even if Hitler never gave the direct order for the implementation of the Final Solution, this is nothing more than a "red herring" as it fails to recognise his "leadership style" where Hitler's simple verbal statements were sufficient to launch initiatives "from below". Those "working towards the Führer" would often implement "his totalitarian vision without written authority". Longerich also stresses, "A history of the 'final solution' must... take account of his central role in the decision-making process, not least because Hitler's constant authorization and legitimization of this policy articulated the central importance of persecuting the Jews for National Socialist policies as a whole."

Throughout his work Hitler and the Final Solution, historian Gerald Fleming demonstrates that on multiple occasions Heinrich Himmler referenced a Führer-Order concerning the destruction of the Jews, making it abundantly clear that Hitler had at the very least verbally issued a command on the matter. The diary entries of Propaganda Minister Joseph Goebbels allude to Hitler being the driving force behind Nazi genocide, that he followed the subject closely and that Goebbels even described Hitler as "uncompromising" about eliminating the Jews. Taking the scale of the logistical operations that the Holocaust comprised in the middle of a war into consideration alone, it is highly unlikely, if not impossible, that the extermination of so many people and the coordination of such an extensive effort could have occurred in the absence of Hitler's authorisation. As Welch relates, if Himmler was the "architect of genocide", he was merely "an instrument of Hitler's will". In the final analysis, Hitler was essentially omnipotent as Nazi Germany's Führer with all-encompassing power as the "supreme legislator, supreme administrator, and supreme judge" along with being the "leader of the Party, the Army, and the people". Hitler ruled the Nazi Party autocratically by asserting the Führerprinzip (leader principle). The principle relied on absolute obedience of all subordinates to their superiors; thus he viewed the government structure as a pyramid, with himself—the infallible leader—at the apex.

== See also ==
- Adolf Hitler's rise to power
- Bibliography of Nazi Germany
- Big lie
- Early timeline of Nazism
- Religious views of Adolf Hitler
- Racial views of Adolf Hitler
