= Names of the Holocaust =

List of names for the genocide of Jewish people under Nazi rule

Names of the Holocaust vary based on context. The Holocaust is the name commonly applied in English since the mid-1940s to the systematic extermination of six million Jews by Nazi Germany during World War II.

The term is sometimes used in a broader sense to include the Nazi Party's systematic murder of millions of people in other groups they considered Untermenschen ('subhuman'), which besides the Jews included Slavs (including Ukrainians, Poles, Russians, Serbs, and Czechs, the former having allegedly infected the latter), and also the Romani people, Balts (especially Lithuanians), people with disabilities, gay men, and political and religious opponents.

In Hebrew, Shoah (שואה), meaning 'a catastrophe', 'a ruin', became the standard term for the Holocaust.

== Names ==
=== The Holocaust ===
The word holocaust originally derived from the Koine Greek word holokauston, meaning "a completely (holos) burnt (kaustos) sacrificial offering," or "a burnt sacrifice offered to a god." In Hellenistic religion, gods of the earth and underworld received dark animals, which were offered by night and burnt in full. The word holocaust was later adopted in Greek translations of the Torah to refer to the olah, (Note: Olah, lit. 'what goes up', ".. i.e goes up in smoke, because the entire animal, except for its hide, was burned on the altar. Other types of sacrifice were consumed in part by fire .. In English, olah has for centuries been translated 'burnt offering'. The olah had a high degree of sanctity, and it was regarded as the 'standard' sacrifice. .. In contrast, sacrifices made by the Greeks to the Olympian gods were always shared by the worshipers; only sacrifices made to the dread underground deities to ward off evil were presented as holocausts, i.e., completely burned.") standard communal and individual sacrificial burnt offerings that Jews were required to make in the times of the Temple in Jerusalem. In its Latin form, holocaustum, the term was first used with specific reference to a massacre of Jewish people by the chroniclers Roger of Howden and Richard of Devizes in England in the 1190s.

The earliest use of the word holocaust to denote a massacre recorded by the Oxford English Dictionary dates from 1833 when the journalist Leitch Ritchie, describing the wars of Louis VII of France, wrote figuratively that he "once made a holocaust of thirteen hundred persons in a church" where they had gone to seek refuge when the town of Vitry-le-François was burned by Louis' troops in 1142. The English poet John Milton had used the word as a poetic description of the self-immolation of a phoenix in his 1671 poem Samson Agonistes.

In the late 19th century, holocaust was used in 1895 by the newspaper The New York Times to describe the Ottoman massacre of Armenian Christians. In the early twentieth century, possibly the first to use the term was journalist Melville Chater in 1925, to describe the burning and sacking of Smyrna in 1922 in the context of the Greek genocide. Winston Churchill (in 1929 (Note: "As for the Turkish atrocities ... helpless Armenians, men, women, and children together, whole districts blotted out in one administrative holocaust – these were beyond human redress.")) and other contemporary writers used it before World War II to describe the Armenian genocide of World War I. The Armenian Genocide is referenced in the title of a 1922 poem "The Holocaust" (published as a booklet) and the 1923 book "The Smyrna Holocaust" deals with arson and massacre of Greeks and Armenians. Before the Second World War, the possibility of another war was referred to as "another holocaust" (that is, a repeat of the First World War). With reference to the events of the war, writers in English from 1945 used the term in relation to events such as the fire-bombing of Dresden or Hiroshima, or the effects of a nuclear war, although from the 1950s onwards, it was increasingly used in English to refer to the Nazi genocide of the European Jews (or Judeocide).

By the late 1950s, documents translated from Hebrew sometimes used the word Holocaust to translate Shoah as the Nazi Judeocide. This use can be found as early as 23 May 1943 in The New York Times, on page E6, in an article by Julian Meltzer, referring to feelings in the British mandate of Palestine about Jewish immigration of refugees from "the Nazi holocaust."

One significant early use was in a 1958 recollection by Leslie Hardman, the first Jewish British Army Chaplain to enter Bergen-Belsen concentration camp in April 1945, where he ministered to survivors and supervised the burial of about 20,000 victims,

Towards me came what seemed to be the remnants of a holocaust – a staggering mass of blackened skin and bones, held together somehow with filthy rags. 'My God, the dead walk', I cried aloud, but I did not recognise my voice... [peering] at the double star, the emblem of Jewry on my tunic - one poor creature touched and then stroked the badge of my faith, and finding that it was real murmured, 'Rabbiner, Rabbiner'.

By the late 1960s, the term was starting to be used in this sense without qualification. Nora Levin's 1968 book The Holocaust: The Destruction of European Jewry, 1933-1945 explains the meaning in its subtitle, but uses the unmoderated phrase "The Holocaust". An article called "Moral Trauma and the Holocaust" was published in the New York Times on February 12, 1968. However, it was not until the late 1970s that the Nazi genocide became the generally accepted conventional meaning of the word, when used unqualified and with a capital letter, a usage that also spread to other languages for the same period. The 1978 television miniseries titled "Holocaust" and starring Meryl Streep is often cited as the principal contributor to establishing the current usage in the wider culture. "Holocaust" was selected as the Association for the German Language's Word of the Year in 1979, reflecting increased public consciousness of the term.

The term became increasingly widespread as a synonym for "genocide" in the last decades of the 20th century to refer to mass murders in the form "X holocaust" (e.g. "Rwandan holocaust").

==== Objections to the usage of "Holocaust" for Nazi extermination of Jews ====
Some people find the use of 'holocaust' for the WWII-period Nazi extermination of Jews unacceptable, on account of the theological and historical nature of the word 'holocaust'. (Note: "It is the rejection of even the hint of such sacrificial thinking that prompts some Jews to refuse to refer to the events of the Shoah as a 'holocaust', the burnt offering with smoke wafting up to heaven".) The American historian Walter Laqueur (whose parents were murdered in the Holocaust) has argued that the term "Holocaust" is a "singularly inappropriate" term for the genocide of the Jews as it implies a "burnt offering" to God. Laqueur wrote, "It was not the intention of the Nazis to make a sacrifice of this kind and the position of the Jews was not that of a ritual victim". The British historian Geoff Eley wrote in a 1982 essay entitled "Holocaust History" that he thought the term Holocaust implies "a certain mystification, an insistence on the uniquely Jewish character of the experience". The British historian Richard J. Evans wrote in 1989 that the term Holocaust was unsuitable, and should not be used.

==== Use of the term for non-Jewish victims of the Nazis ====
While the terms Shoah and Final Solution always refer to the fate of the Jews during the Nazi rule, the term Holocaust is sometimes used in a wider sense to describe other genocides of the Nazi and other regimes.

The Columbia Encyclopedia defines "Holocaust" as the "name given to the period of persecution and extermination of European Jews by Nazi Germany". The Compact Oxford English Dictionary and Microsoft Encarta give similar definitions. The Encyclopædia Britannica defines "Holocaust" as "the systematic state-sponsored killing of six million Jewish men, women and children, and millions of others by Nazi Germany and its collaborators during World War II", although the article goes on to say, "The Nazis also singled out the Roma (Gypsies). They were the only other group that the Nazis systematically killed in gas chambers alongside the Jews."

Scholars are divided on whether the term Holocaust should be applied to all victims of Nazi mass murder, with some using it synonymously with Shoah or "Final Solution to the Jewish Question", and others including the killing of Romani people, imprisonment and execution of homosexual men, execution of the disabled, execution of the Poles, the execution of Soviet prisoners of war, murder of political opponents, and the persecution of Jehovah's Witnesses.

Czechoslovak–Israeli historian Yehuda Bauer, stated: "Let us be clear: … Shoah, Churban, Judeocide, whatever we call it, is the name we give to the attempted planned total physical annihilation of the Jewish people, and its partial perpetration with the murder of most of the Jews of Europe." He also contends that the Holocaust should include only Jews because it was the intent of the Nazis to exterminate all Jews, while the other groups were not to be totally annihilated. Inclusion of non-Jewish victims of the Nazis in the Holocaust is objected to by many persons including, and by organizations such as Yad Vashem, an Israeli state institution in Jerusalem established in 1953 to commemorate the victims of the Holocaust. They say that the word was originally meant to describe the extermination of the Jews, and that the Jewish Holocaust was a crime on such a scale, and of such totality and specificity, as the culmination of the long history of European antisemitism, that it should not be subsumed into a general category with the other crimes of the Nazis.

However, Nobel laureate and Jewish Holocaust survivor Elie Wiesel considered non-Jewish victims to be Holocaust victims, declaring to President Jimmy Carter, "Not all the victims of the Holocaust were Jews, but all Jews were victims," when he asked his support for a national Holocaust museum in Washington.

British historian Michael Burleigh and German historian Wolfgang Wippermann maintain that although all Jews were victims, the Holocaust transcended the confines of the Jewish community – other people shared the tragic fate of victimhood. Hungarian former Minister for Roma Affairs László Teleki applies the term Holocaust to both the murder of Jews and Romani peoples by the Nazis. In The Columbia Guide to the Holocaust, American historians Donald Niewyk and Francis Nicosia use the term to include Jews, Romani and the disabled. American historian Dennis Reinhartz has claimed that the Romani were the main victims of genocide in Croatia and Serbia during the Second World War, and has called this "the Balkan Holocaust 1941-1945".

=== Final Solution ===
The Endlösung der Judenfrage ('final solution to the Jewish question') was the Nazis' own term, recorded in the minutes of the Wannsee Conference on 20 January 1942, and translated into English for the Nuremberg trials in 1945. Before the word Holocaust became normative, this phrase was also used by writers in English. For example, in William Shirer's The Rise and Fall of the Third Reich, the genocide is described as 'the Final Solution' (in quotation marks; the word Holocaust is not mentioned). In both English and German, 'Final Solution' has been widely used as an alternative to 'Holocaust'. (Note: A useful analysis of the terms can be found in Bartov (1998).) Whereas the term 'Holocaust' is now often used to include all casualties of the Nazi death camps and murder squads, 'Final Solution' refers exclusively to the attempt to annihilate the Jewish people. (Note: As defined at the site of the United States Holocaust Memorial Museum.) For a time after World War II, German historians also used the term Völkermord ('genocide'), or in full, der Völkermord an den Juden ('the genocide of the Jewish people'), while the prevalent term in Germany today is either 'Holocaust' or increasingly 'Shoah'.

=== Shoah ===
The biblical word Shoah (שואה), also spelled Shoa and Sho'ah, meaning "calamity" in Hebrew (and also used to refer to "destruction" since the Middle Ages), became the standard Hebrew term for the 20th-century Holocaust as early as the early 1940s. In recent literature it is specifically prefixed with Ha ("The" in Hebrew) when referring to Nazi mass-murders, for the same reason that "holocaust" becomes "The Holocaust". It may be spelled Ha-Shoah or HaShoah, as in Yom HaShoah, the annual Jewish "Holocaust and Heroism Remembrance Day".

Shoah had earlier been used in the context of the Nazis as a translation of "catastrophe". For example, in 1934, when Chaim Weizmann told the Zionist Action Committee that Hitler's rise to power was "an unforeseen catastrophe, comparable to another world war" (German: "unvorhergesehene Katastrophe, etwa ein neuer Weltkrieg"), the Hebrew press translated Katastrophe as Shoah. In the spring of 1942, the Jerusalem historian BenZion Dinur (Dinaburg) used Shoah in a book published by the United Aid Committee for the Jews in Poland to describe the extermination of Europe's Jews, calling it a "catastrophe" that symbolized the unique situation of the Jewish people. The word Shoah was chosen in Israel to describe the Holocaust, the term institutionalized by the Knesset on April 12, 1951, when it established Yom Ha-Shoah Ve Mered Ha-Getaot, the national day of remembrance. In the 1950s, Yad Vashem, the Israel "Holocaust Martyrs' and Heroes' Remembrance Authority" was routinely translating this into English as "the Disaster". At that time, holocaust was often used to mean the conflagration of much of humanity in a nuclear war. Since then, Yad Vashem has changed its practice; the word "Holocaust", usually now capitalized, has come to refer principally to the genocide of the European Jews. The Israeli historian Saul Friedländer wrote in 1987 of "the growing centrality of the Shoah for Jewish communities in the Diaspora" and that "The Shoah is almost becoming a symbol of identification, for better or for worse, whether because of the weakening of the bond of religion or because of the lesser salience of Zionism and Israel as an identification element".

=== Khurbn and destruction ===
Khurbn eyrope (חורבן אײראָפּע) "Destruction of Europe", or simply khurbn, is the term for the Holocaust in Yiddish. The Hebrew word khurbn (sometimes spelled "churban", Hebrew: חֻרְבָּן ḥurbān "destruction") is used in Hebrew and Yiddish to describe the destruction of Solomon's Temple and the Second Temple. Max Kaufmann's early (1947) history of the genocide in Latvia was called Khurbn Letland, that is, The Destruction of the Jews of Latvia. Published later, Raul Hilberg's most important work was The Destruction of the European Jews.

=== Porajmos ===
The Porajmos (also Porrajmos) literally "Devouring", or Samudaripen ("Mass killing") is a term adopted by the Romani historian Ian Hancock to describe attempts by the Nazis to exterminate most of the Romani peoples of Europe. The phenomenon has been little studied.

=== Translation variants ===
Even though most countries adopted translations or transliterations of the term Holocaust or Shoah (e.g. Spanish: Holocausto; Russian: Холокост Kholokost; Czech: Šoa; etc.), there are instances in which certain populations, frequently those populations which were affected by the Holocaust itself, have adopted unique names which denote the event. In Polish, for instance, the Holocaust is frequently referred to as Zagłada Żydów, or 'destruction of the Jews', although Holokaust is used in more general contexts. In Sweden, the Holocaust is most commonly called Förintelsen ('the annihilation'), a term etymologically similar to the German word Vernichtung, used in Hitler's prophecy from his 30 January 1939 Reichstag speech.

== See also ==
- Silent Holocaust (disambiguation)

== Sources ==
- Bartoszewski, Władysław T. (1991). The Convent at Auschwitz. New York: George Braziller. ISBN 0-8076-1267-7. LCCN 91010127. OCLC 23179857. OL 1532483M. "Do not Christianize Auschwitz and Shoah!"
- Bauer, Yehuda (1982). A History of the Holocaust. Assisted by Nili Keren. Danbury: Franklin Watts. ISBN 0-531-09862-1. LCCN 81021917. OCLC 470895943. OL 3781812M.
- Berenbaum, Michael (1990). A Mosaic of Victims: Non-Jews Persecuted and Murdered by the Nazis. New York: New York University Press. ISBN 0814711316. LCCN 89013784. OCLC 20823938. OL 2194752M.
- Berenbaum, Michael; Peck, Abraham J., eds. (1998). The Holocaust and History: The Known, the Unknown, the Disputed, and the Reexamined. Bloomington: Indiana University Press. ISBN 0-253-33374-1. LCCN 97040030. OCLC 1302092564. OL 692799M.
  - Bauer, Yehuda (1998). "A Past That Will Not Go Away". In Berenbaum & Peck (1998), pp. 12–22.
  - Bartov, Omer (1998). "Antisemitism, the Holocaust, and Reinterpretation of National Socialism". In Berenbaum & Peck (1998), pp. 75–98.
- Burleigh, Michael; Wippermann, Wolfgang (1991). The Racial State: Germany 1933–1945. Cambridge: Cambridge University Press. ISBN 0-521-39802-9. LCCN 90020209. OCLC 53246498. OL 7739425M.
- Carroll, James (2001). Constantine's Sword: The Church and the Jews. Boston: Mariner Books. ISBN 0-395-77927-8. OCLC 44727744. Wikidata Q5163785.
- Churchill, Winston S. (1929). The World Crisis. The Aftermath. Vol. 4. New York: Charles Scribner's Sons. OL 49657685M. Wikidata Q17018262.
- Crowe, David M. (2008). The Holocaust: Roots, History, and Aftermath. Boulder, CO: Westview Press. ISBN 978-0-8133-4325-9.
- Evans, Richard J. (1989). In Hitler's Shadow: West German Historians and the Attempt to Escape from the Nazi Past. New York City: Pantheon Books. ISBN 978-0-394-57686-2. LCCN 88043239. OCLC 18740694. OL 2061583M. Wikidata Q140468023.
- Fremont-Smith, Eliot (12 February 1968). "Moral Trauma and the Holocaust". The New York Times. p. 37.
- Hardman, Leslie; Goodman, Cecily (1958). The Survivors: the story of the Belsen Remnant. London: Vallentine, Mitchell. OL 13674913M.
- Leviticus 1:1–17
- Niewyk, Donald L.; Nicosia, Francis R. (2000). The Columbia Guide to the Holocaust. New York: Columbia University Press. ISBN 9780231112000.
- Plaut, W. Gunther, ed. (1981). The Torah. A Modern Commentary. New York: Union of American Hebrew Congregations.
- Shirer, William Lawrence (1960). The Rise and Fall of the Third Reich: A History of Nazi Germany. New York City: Simon & Schuster. ASIN B0766DKDLR. LCCN 60006729. OCLC 1286630. OL 5794925M. Wikidata Q138029595.
- Yerkes, Royden Keith (1952). Sacrifice in Greek and Roman Religions and in Early Judaism. New York: Allenson.
