= Constantine's Sword (film) =

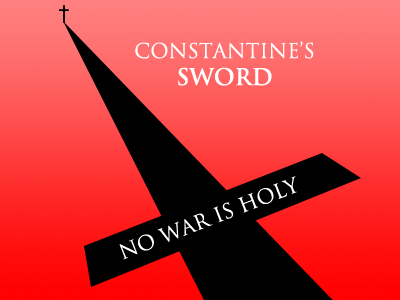
- The central visual symbol of the film, Constantine's Sword.
- Directed by: Oren Jacoby
- Written by: Oren Jacoby; James Carroll
- Produced by: Mick Garris; Robb Idels; John Landis
- Narrated by: Amanda Pays
- Cinematography: Robert Richman
- Edited by: Kate Hirson
- Release date: 2007
- Running time: 93 minutes
- Country: United States

James Carroll's Constantine's Sword, or Constantine's Sword, is a 2007 documentary film on the relationship between the Catholic Church and Jews. Directed and produced by Oscar-nominated filmmaker Oren Jacoby, the film is inspired by former priest James P. Carroll's 2001 book Constantine's Sword.

== Synopsis ==
The title page of this film shows the shadow of a cross, with "No war is holy" written across the transept. Constantine’s Sword is the story of James P. Carroll's journey to uncover the roots of war. Carroll, a former Catholic priest whose father (Joseph Carroll) was a famous Air Force general, posits that there has been a relationship between religiously inspired violence and war, beginning with the adoption of Christianity by the Roman Emperor Constantine I in 312 AD. Constantine was convinced that he had won a battle because he had followed the instructions of a vision, to inscribe a sign of the cross (the Labarum) on the shields of his soldiers. At the time most of Constantine's legionaries were Christians themselves including Constantine's mother St. Helena. In Carroll's view, this event marked the beginning of an unholy alliance between the military and the Church. Carroll's thesis is explained as his father's translation to Carroll's question as a boy of what the letters IHS stood for in churches, being the IHS monogram for the name of Jesus, as Constantine's vision of "In hoc signo vinces", "in this sign you will conquer", implying a union of state military with church dogma.

Carroll focuses on Catholic and evangelical anti-Judaism, and invokes the cross as a symbol of the long history of Christian xenophobic violence against Jews and non-Christians, from the Crusades, through the Roman Inquisition and the creation of the Jewish ghetto, to the Holocaust. Carroll also charges that there is an ongoing evangelical infiltration of the U.S. military, and that this has had negative consequences for U.S. foreign policy. The film's final chapter, "No war is holy", concludes with views of military cemeteries as Aaron Neville sings "With God On Our Side".

== Technical details ==
- 95 minutes
- Languages in film: English, German, Italian and Yiddish
- Cast/Featuring: Liev Schreiber, pastor Ted Haggard, Philip Bosco, Natasha Richardson, Eli Wallach
- Director: Oren Jacoby
- Producers: Oren Jacoby, James Carroll, Michael Solomon, Betsy West.
- Supervising producer: Elgin Smith
- Screenwriters: James Carroll, Oren Jacoby
- Production company: Storyville Films
- Studio: First Run Features

== See also ==
- Constantine's Sword (2001) book by James P. Carroll
