= Survivors of the Abortion Holocaust =

Christian American anti-abortion group

Survivors of the Abortion Holocaust is a Christian American anti-abortion group based in California, founded by Jeff White. The group is best known for displaying graphic images of aborted fetuses in public locations. Survivors of the Abortion Holocaust has attracted nationwide and international attention, regarding the use of graphic abortion imagery, and the debate over the protection of the use of such imagery, by freedom of speech.

== History ==
Survivors of the Abortion Holocaust was founded in 1998 by Jeff White, who was previously involved in the leadership of another anti-abortion group, Operation Rescue. It was co-founded by Cheryl Conrad, who reports that she became active in anti-abortion ministry in the 1980s, after she "faced the truth" of her own abortion. The group considers anyone born after January 22, 1973, the date Roe vs Wade legalized abortion in the United States, as survivors of the "American abortion holocaust". The group name is sometimes shortened to "Survivors".

== Activities ==
Survivors of the Abortion Holocaust is primarily a youth organization, which regularly hosts training sessions aimed at high school and college aged young men and women. After training, the young activists often target college or university campuses as demonstration locations, in hopes of dissuading the college aged individuals, whom they view as a demographic "at risk for abortion", from having abortions. Demonstrations involve displaying large signs with pictures of aborted fetuses, attempting to engage passers by in conversation about abortion, and the distribution of anti-abortion literature. Because of the use of young activists, the group has been called "the new face of the anti-abortion movement".

== Controversy regarding name ==
Survivors of the Abortion Holocaust has received criticism regarding the use of the word "holocaust" in their name. Although Merriam-Webster Dictionary defines "holocaust" as "a mass slaughter of people: a genocide", since the 1940s "the Holocaust" usually refers to the mass slaughter of Jews by Nazis during World War II. Fueling the controversy over their name, in 2013, Survivors of the Abortion Holocaust held an anti-abortion demonstration at the New Mexico Holocaust & Intolerance Museum, and they demanded the museum include exhibits on abortion, offending local Jewish leaders. Rabbi Harry Ronsenfeld said, "It is offensive when someone co-opts what's yours". In defense of their use of the term, the Survivors said the number of abortions that take place in the United States qualifies it as a genocide.

== Controversy over graphic imagery ==
Survivors of the Abortion Holocaust has received criticism regarding their use of graphic abortion imagery. The pictures of blood covered fetuses have been described as "overwhelmingly bloody and gory" and "grotesque". In the anti-abortion movement, displaying images of aborted fetuses is referred to as a "truth display", and the use of such imagery is considered controversial, even among those who oppose abortion. Concerns regarding exposing young children to these images have been raised, and the use of this imagery has been called insensitive. However, anti-abortion advocates defend the use of these pictures by comparing graphic abortion imagery to other accepted graphic imagery. A comparison has been drawn between pictures of aborted fetuses and the "Napalm Girl" photograph, which graphically depicted a civilian attack during the Vietnam War. While the images used by the Survivors of the Abortion Holocaust have been described as "pushing the boundaries of decency", a group member defended the use of such imagery by saying, "yes, the pictures show the violence after it happened, but what is so much worse than the pictures is the actual violence, and if we have to show what is happening to stop it, then we have to go there and show it."

== Legal battles ==
=== Colorado School of Mines ===
In 2005, two Survivors of the Abortion Holocaust members sued the Colorado School of Mines, claiming a violation of their First Amendment, freedom of speech rights, after they were arrested while protesting on a campus sidewalk. A group member said he "believes the protest was broken up because someone complained about the content of the posters, which featured photos of fetuses and abortion". The group member stated, "clearly we have the right to be on the sidewalk and express ourselves". In 2006, the lawsuit was settled in favor of the Survivors of the Abortion Holocaust group members for $25,000.

=== Asheville-Buncombe Technical Community College ===
In 2007, an anti-abortion protest at Asheville-Buncombe Technical Community College, in which approximately 15 group members displayed signs depicting images of aborted fetuses was deemed "unruly" and resulted in trespass arrests when the group members refused to leave campus when told to do so by police. Video of the incident shows group members saying the college is federally funded, and is therefore public property, so they have the right to protest there. In response, the arresting officer informed the group members that AB-Tech's vice president of student services, Dennis King, had the authority to ask them to leave. Dennis King said he asked the protesters to leave after three faculty members "approached me in a highly agitated fashion and demanded that the protesters be removed." In 2008, two group members involved in the incident were found guilty of trespassing.

=== University of California Santa Barbara ===
In March 2014, two Survivors of the Abortion Holocaust members pressed charges against a University of California Santa Barbara professor, after the professor stole their sign and pushed and scratched a group member who tried to retrieve the sign. The sign depicted an image of an aborted fetus. Police later found the sign destroyed. The theft occurred in an area of the UCSB campus designated as the "free speech zone". The incident has prompted debate about free speech protections and limits, and has raised concerns regarding suppression of free speech on college campuses. The professor, later identified as Mireille Miller-Young, a feminist studies professor, was quoted in her police report saying she believed she had a "moral right" to take the sign, and referred to the demonstration as "hate speech". In March 2014, the district attorney charged Miller-Young with theft, battery and vandalism. Miller-Young originally entered a plea "not guilty" but In July 2014, she pleaded "no contest" to three misdemeanor charges. Miller-Young was sentenced to three years of probation, 100 hours of community service, 10 hours of anger-management courses and $493 in restitution. In November 2014, the Life Legal Defense Foundation filed a civil lawsuit on behalf of the Survivors against Miller-Young and University of California Santa Barbara. The complaint was filed to "vindicate [the plaintiff's] own rights and rights of others" with the Survivors also claiming that the university did not discipline Miler-Young for the March 2014 incident.

=== Newport Beach "chalk and awe" ===
In 2013 and 2014, group members from Survivors of the Abortion Holocaust protested and wrote chalk messages on the street and sidewalk of the Newport Beach, California neighborhood of Dr. Richard Agnew, a Hoag Hospital-affiliated obstetrician The Survivors targeted Agnew's neighborhood because he signed a letter objecting to the hospital's decision to ban elective abortions. Messages scrawled in Agnew's neighborhood in chalk included: "abortion is murder", "Stop Killing American Children", and "your neighbor is a monster". In response to the group's 2013 protests, the local city council passed an ordinance that bars protesters from picketing within 300 feet of a home. In 2014, The Survivors returned to Agnew's Newport Beach neighborhood to "test the ordinance" and were careful to remain within legal limits. The 2014 protests angered neighbors. One neighbor told a reporter from the Daily Pilot, "These people are threatening". A scuffle reportedly broke out between protesters and residents, with both sides making citizen's arrests, but the cases were dismissed due to lack of evidence. Neighbors complained the Survivor's sidewalk chalking constituted vandalism, but law enforcement officials said they would not be filing charges.

== See also ==
- 180 (2011 American film)
- Silent Holocaust (disambiguation)
- United States anti-abortion movement
