= David Nirenberg =

American historian

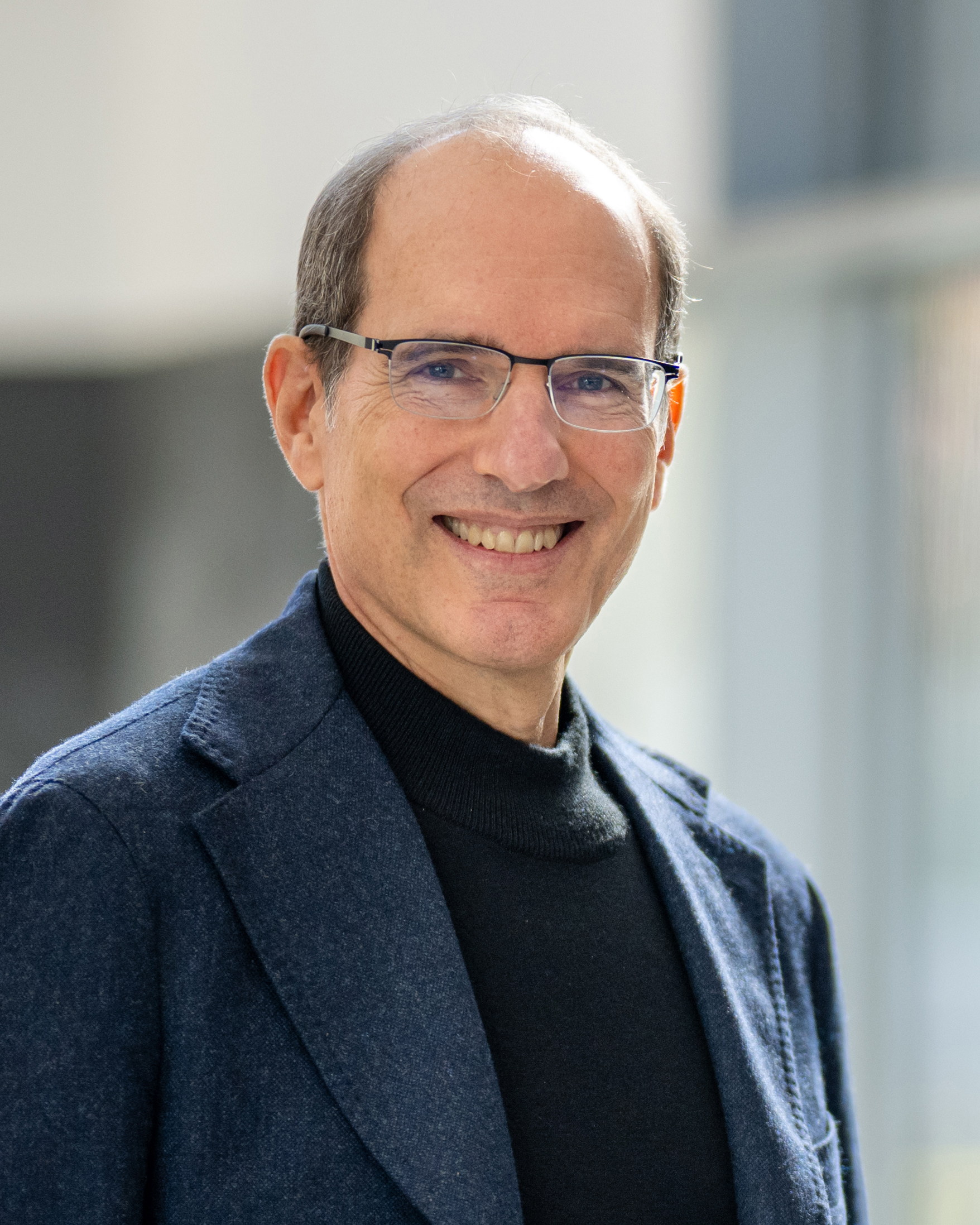
- Nirenberg in 2023
- Born: 1964 (age 61–62); New York City, U.S.
- Awards: Premio del Rey in Early Spanish History (1996); Ralph Waldo Emerson Award (2014); Gordon J. Laing Award (2017); Historikerpreis der Stadt Münster (2017); Leopold Lucas Prize (2024); Balzan Prize (2026)

Academic background
- Education: Yale University (BA); Princeton University (MA, PhD)

Academic work
- Main interests: History of Christian, Jewish, and Muslim relations; History of Spain and the Mediterranean; History of ideas
- Notable works: Anti-Judaism; Communities of Violence; Neighboring Faiths

David Nirenberg (born 1964) is an American medievalist and intellectual historian.

He is the Director and Leon Levy Professor at the Institute for Advanced Study in Princeton, NJ. He previously taught at the University of Chicago, where he was Dean of the Divinity School, and Deborah R. and Edgar D. Jannotta Distinguished Service Professor of Medieval History and the Committee on Social Thought, as well as the former Executive Vice Provost of the University, Dean of the Social Sciences Division, and the founding Roman Family Director of the Neubauer Family Collegium for Culture and Society. He is also appointed to the Department of Romance Languages and Literatures, the Center for Middle Eastern Studies, the Joyce Z. and Jacob Greenberg Center for Jewish Studies.

He is notable for his landmark analysis in 2013 of antijudaism as a constitutive principle of the Western tradition, and his argument for a longue durée approach to historical understanding, a career about-face from the methodological approach taken in his 1996 work, Communities of Violence: Persecution of Minorities in the Middle Ages. He has a particular interest in Christian, Jewish, and Muslim thought in medieval Europe.

In 2024, he was elected to the American Philosophical Society.

== Life and career ==
The son of immigrants from Argentina who settled in Upstate New York, his father Ricardo Nirenberg taught him Euclidean geometry and had him memorize book I of the Odyssey in Ancient Greek.

David Nirenberg earned his AB from Yale, where John Boswell introduced him to the study of minorities in Medieval Aragon. He holds a PhD from Princeton, where he studied under Peter Brown, Natalie Zemon Davis, and William Chester Jordan. He has held visiting professorships at the School for Advanced Studies in the Social Sciences in Paris, the Spanish National Research Council in Madrid, and the Berlin Institute for Advanced Study, is an Associate of Germany's Max Planck Society for the Advancement of Science, as well as a fellow of the American Academy of Arts and Sciences, and a former fellow at the Katz Center for Advanced Judaic Studies.

In 2006 he joined the History Department at the University of Chicago and the Committee on Social Thought. Between 2014 and 2017 he served as dean of the Social Sciences Division of the University of Chicago. In 2017 he became Executive Vice Provost, and in 2018 he additionally took on the role of Interim Dean of the Divinity School, stepping down from the Provost's office a year later. He became Director of the Institute for Advanced Study in Princeton in 2022.

== Major works ==
=== Anti-Judaism ===
Nirenberg's 2013 book Anti-Judaism: The Western Tradition is not a history of racist anti-Semitism, rather, it focuses "on the role of anti-Judaism as a constitutive idea and an explanatory force in Christian and post-Christian thought—though it starts with Egyptian arguments against the Jews and includes a discussion of early Islam, whose writers echo, and apparently learned from, Christian polemics." Pulling on an array of sources from across the centuries, Nirenberg demonstrates the potency of "imaginary Jews" in "works of the imagination, profound treatises, and acts of political radicalism."

“Anti-Judaism should not be understood as some archaic or irrational closet in the vast edifices of Western thought,” Nirenberg observes in his introduction, as quoted and affirmed by Paula Frederiksen in her review. “It was rather one of the basic tools with which that edifice was constructed.” And as he ominously concludes, hundreds of pages later, “We live in an age in which millions of people are exposed daily to some variant of the argument that the challenges of the world they live in are best explained in terms of ‘Israel’.”

Described by reviewers "an extraordinary scholarly achievement," and as a "magisterial work of intellectual history," Anti-Judaism argues "that a certain view of Judaism lies deep in the structure of Western civilization and has helped its intellectuals and polemicists explain Christian heresies, political tyrannies, medieval plagues, capitalist crises, and revolutionary movements."

David A. Bell of Princeton University calls it "quite simply one of the most important pieces of humanities scholarship to appear in many years. Supremely learned, beautifully written, and powerfully argued, it takes on nothing less than the Western tradition itself. And it makes a case we cannot afford to ignore." Christopher Smith of King's College London notices that Anti-Judaism represents, "the culmination of a career volte-face in respects to his methodological approach. His 1996 work Communities of Violence: Persecution of Minorities in the Middle Ages rejected a longue duree history of anti-Semitism." Whereas, "in Anti-Judaism, Nirenberg allows for a continuation of trends in the development of a shared concept of anti-Judaism built on and progressed over" a period of three thousand years. Some historians, while praising Nirenberg's oeuvre, have expressed dissatisfaction with the parts concerning contemporary history.

=== Communities of Violence ===
Nirenberg's 1996 book Communities of Violence: Persecution of Minorities in the Middle Ages challenged interpretations that set inter-communal medieval violence (specifically, attacks on lepers, Jews, and Muslims) into larger teleological frameworks. It argued that each event must be understood in its own terms, in the context of economic and social tensions available for exploitation in a specific time and place. He argues that primacy should be given to understanding the local meaning of inter-communal violent events, and that violent events can be better understood as one of the mechanisms that in fact contributed to social stability and kept the overall amount of violence low. The book makes these broader arguments by focusing on Aragon in the 1300s.

The preface to the French translation was given by Claude Gauvard, one of France's leading historians.

Nirenberg questions the longue duree approach that sets individual riots, attacks and pogroms into a series that he characterizes as a "march of intolerance" culminating in modern events, most notably the Holocaust. The book has been understood as a challenge to the entire concept of minority history, reinterpreting groups often cast as "other" or "marginal" as integral parts of the societies in which they dwelt. It has also been criticized for facile use of structural functionalism and of the essayist René Girard's model.

== Publications ==
=== List of books ===
- Nirenberg, Ricardo; Nirenberg, David (2021). Uncountable: A Philosophical History of Number and Humanity from Antiquity to the Present. University of Chicago Press. ISBN 978-0-226-64698-5.
- Aesthetic Theology and Its Enemies: Judaism in Christian Painting, Poetry, and Politics, Brandeis University Press (2015).
- Neighboring Faiths: Christianity, Islam, and Judaism in the Middle Ages and Today, University of Chicago Press (October 2014). ISBN 978-0-226-37985-2.
- Anti-Judaism: The Western Tradition, W.W. Norton (2013). ISBN 978-0-393-34791-3.
  - Anti-Judaismus: Eine andere Geschichte des westlichen Denkens, (2017) translated by: Martin Richter ISBN 978-3-406-67531-7
- Judaism and Christian Art: Aesthetic Anxieties from the Catacombs to Colonialism (with Herbert Kessler), University of Pennsylvania Press (2011).
- Communities of Violence: Persecution of Minorities in the Middle Ages, Princeton University Press (1996). Paperback edition, February, 1998.
  - Comunidades de Violencia: Persecución de minorías en la edad media, Peninsula Editorial (2001);
  - Violence et minorités au Moyen Age, Presses Universitaires de France (2001), preface by Claude Gauvard. ISBN 978-0-691-16576-9.

=== Selected articles ===
- Nirenberg, Ricardo; Nirenberg, David (29 December 2021). "Numbers and Humanity". Liberties. 2 (2).
- "What Is Islam? (What Is Christianity? What Is Judaism?)." Raritan 35 (Fall 2016): 1–14.
- "Love." In What Reason Promises: Essays on Reason, Nature, and History, edited by Wendy Doniger, Peter Galison, and Susan Neiman, 46–54. Berlin: De Gruyter, 2016.
- (With Leonardo Capezzone) "Religions of Love: Judaism, Christianity, Islam." In The Oxford Handbook of the Abrahamic Religions, edited by Adam Silverstein and Guy G. Stroumsa, 518–535. Oxford: Oxford University Press, 2015. doi:10.1093/oxfordhb/9780199697762.013.20. ISBN 978-0-19-969776-2.
- "Power and Piety: Is the Promotion of Violence Inherent to Any Religion?" Nation (April 29, 2015).
- "Posthumous Love in Judaism." In Love After Death: Concepts of Posthumous Love in Medieval and Early Modern Europe, edited by Bernhard Jussen and Ramie Targoff, 55–70. Berlin: De Gruyter, 2015.
- "'Judaism' as Political Concept: Toward a Critique of Political Theology". Representations. 128 (1). Regents of the University of California: 1–29. Fall 2014. doi:10.1525/rep.2014.128.1.1..
- Nirenberg, Ricardo; Nirenberg, David (2011). "Badiou's Number: A Critique of Mathematical Ontology". Critical Inquiry. 37 (4): 583–614. doi:10.1086/660983. JSTOR 660983. S2CID 122703140.
- "Shakespeare's Jewish Questions." Renaissance Drama (2010): 77–113. JSTOR 41917471.
- "Love and Capitalism." New Republic 240, no. 17 (September 2009): 39-42.
- "The Politics of Love and its Enemies." Critical Inquiry 33, no. 3 (2007): 573-605. doi:10.1086/513528. JSTOR 513528.
- Nirenberg, David (September 23, 2010). "Double Game: Review of "Maimonides in his World" by Sarah Stroumsa". London Review of Books. 32 (18): 31–32. ISBN 978-0-691-13763-6..
- Nirenberg, David. "The Rhineland Massacres of Jews in the First Crusade, Memories Medieval and Modern*". Medieval Concepts of the Past: Ritual, Memory, Historiography.

== See also ==
- Political theology
- Constantine's Sword, a 2001 work by James Carroll
- Supersessionism
- Anti-Semite and Jew, a 1944 work by Jean-Paul Sartre
- "On the Jewish Question", a 1844 work by Karl Marx
- Jules Michelet § Themes in revolutionary historiography and the understanding of history.

== Sources ==
- Fredriksen, Paula (9 December 2013). "Anti-Judaism and Early Christianity". Marginalia.
