= Churban =

Churban may refer to:

- The destruction of the First Temple during the Siege of Jerusalem (587 BC).
- The destruction of the Second Temple during the Siege of Jerusalem (70 AD)
- Churban Europa, a term for the Holocaust which uses the word for the destruction of the Second Temple
- An early version of Rhythmic CHR, a radio format
