= Longue durée =

Concept in history

The longue durée (French pronunciation: [lɔ̃ɡ dyʁe]; English: the long term) is the approach to the study of history championed by the group of historians comprising the Annales school. It gives priority to long-term historical structures over what French sociologist François Simiand called histoire événementielle ("evental history", the short-term time-scale that is the domain of the chronicler and the journalist). It concentrates instead on all-but-permanent or slowly evolving structures and replaces elite biographies with the broader syntheses of prosopography. The crux of its idea is to examine extended periods of time and draw conclusions from historical trends and patterns.

== Approach ==
The longue durée is part of a tripartite system that includes short-term événements and medium-term conjunctures (periods of decades or centuries where profound cultural changes such as the Industrial Revolution can take place). Its approach, which incorporates social scientific methods such as the recently evolved field of economic history into general history, was pioneered by Marc Bloch and Lucien Febvre in the 1918–39 interwar period. The approach was carried on by Fernand Braudel, who published his views after becoming the editor of the Annales journal in 1956. In the second half of the 20th century, Braudel took stock of the current status of social studies in crisis, foundering under the weight of their own successes, in an article in 1958, "Histoire et sciences sociales: La longue durée". Among the works Braudel considered examples of the longue durée was Alphonse Dupront's study of the long-standing idea in Western Europe of a crusade, which extended across diverse European societies far beyond the last days of the actual crusades, and among spheres of thought with a long life. In the longue durée of economic history, he wrote that "old attitudes of thought and action, resistant frameworks dying hard, at times against all logic" lay beneath the cycles and structural crises. He also stressed the importance of slow-changing geographic factors, like the constraints placed by the natural environment upon human production and communication. In the first volume of his 1949 book La Méditerranée et le monde méditerranéen à l'époque de Philippe II (The Mediterranean and the Mediterranean World in the Age of Philip II), for example, he described the tension between mountain dwellers and plain dwellers, with their different cultures and economic models, as a basic feature of Mediterranean history over thousands of years. The idea of the longue durée that informs Braudel's analysis of the effects of geography on human affairs sketched in the opening of La Méditerranée and especially the 1967 first volume of his three-volume work Civilisation Matérielle, Économie et Capitalisme, XV^{e}-XVIII^{e} (Civilization and Capitalism, 15th-18th Century) therefore offers a contrast to the archives-directed history that arose at the end of the 19th century and a return to the broader views of the earlier generation of Jules Michelet, Leopold von Ranke, Jacob Burckhardt, and Numa Denis Fustel de Coulanges.

British historian Averil Cameron claimed that in examining the Mediterranean world in late antiquity "consideration of the longue durée is more helpful than the appeal to immediate causal factors." Chilean historian Sergio Villalobos also expressly took the long view in his Historia del pueblo chileno.

French political scientist Jean-François Bayart extended the longue durée concept to Africa. He argued that the systems of inequality and domination inherent in pre-colonial African societies had their own historical dynamics, so postcolonial national constructions could not be understood from the sole point of view of their relations with the Western powers and their position in the world economy. He therefore wrote that African states must be analyzed in their historicity, which implies analyzing the power relations within contemporary African societies, in particular the role played by the dominant class in its societies so as to update all the parameters that influence the present and the future of these States.

Lebanese anthropologist Munira Khayyat applies the concept to South Lebanon in her 2022 book A Landscape of War: Ecologies of Resistance and Survival in South Lebanon. She claims that "resistant ecologies"—adaptation and survival strategies of the population, nature, and animals to the long-lasting effects of multiple wars—have developed in the region, and that these wars should not be seen as isolated conflicts but as a prolonged persistent condition in the vein of the longue durée.

== See also ==
- Cliodynamics
- Macrohistory
- World-systems theory
- David Nirenberg § Anti-Judaism: The Western Tradition

== Sources and further reading ==
- Fernand Braudel and Sarah Matthews, On History, The University of Chicago Press, 1982, ISBN 978-0-226-07151-0
- Robert D. Putnam with Robert Leonardi and Raffaella Y. Nanetti, Making Democracy Work: Civic Traditions in Modern Italy, Princeton University Press, 1993, ISBN 0-691-03738-8
- Debating the long durée, a special section in Annales. Histoire, Sciences Sociales – English Edition, ISSN: 2398-5682 (Print), 2268–3763 (Online)
