= Michael Burleigh =

English historian, born 1955

Michael Burleigh (born 3 April 1955) is a British historian, author, and commentator. He has written extensively on international relations, populism, terrorism, and modern European history. He was the first Engelsberg Chair of History and International Relations at the London School of Economics (LSE) IDEAS centre.

== Early life and education ==
Burleigh was educated at University College London (UCL) where he was awarded a first in history in 1977. He later attended Bedford College, London where he received a PhD in history in 1982.

== Career ==
Burleigh has held academic posts at New College, Oxford and the London School of Economics (LSE). At Cardiff University, he was a Distinguished Research Professor in Modern History. He has also taught in the US at Washington and Lee University in Virginia and as Kratter Visiting Professor at Stanford University.

At the LSE, Burleigh was appointed the inaugural Engelsberg Chair of History and International Relations in 2019. He has contributed to research on foreign policy and international security and is an annual visiting professor.

Burleigh is the author of a number of books, including The Third Reich: A New History (2000), Small Wars, Far Away Places: The Genesis of the Modern World 1945–65 (2013), The Best of Times, The Worst of Times: A History of Now (2017), which examined the stability of the post-Second World War liberal order, Populism: Before and After the Pandemic (2021), and Day of the Assassins: A History of Political Murder (2021).

Burleigh has presented and contributed to television documentaries, including Selling Murder: The Killing Films of the Third Reich (1991), and Heil Herbie: The Story of the Volkswagen Beetle (1993). He has also written regularly for British newspapers including The Times, The Daily Telegraph, The London Standard, The Daily Mail, and The Mail on Sunday. He was a contributor to Standpoint magazine and Perspective magazine and had a foreign policy column on UnHerd.

He was the founding editor of the journal Totalitarian Movements and Political Religions and has served on the editorial boards of Totalitarismus und Demokratie and Ethnic and Racial Studies. He is a Contributing Editor at Literary Review.

Burleigh is a Fellow of the Royal Historical Society and served on the Academic Advisory Board of the Institut für Zeitgeschichte in Munich until 2018.

He served on the UK government’s Advisory Committee for the Centenary Commemoration of World War I from 2012 to 2018. In 2012, he founded Sea Change Partners, a geopolitical risk consultancy.

== Critical reception ==
Of his book, The Third Reich: A New History, the journal Foreign Affairs said,

This exemplary history proves that brilliant historians can still enlighten their readers -- even when the facts are familiar.... This account gives Hitler and the war less attention than do other versions, but... keeps the reader's mind on the essentials.

The Guardian said,

In a major work that crackles with ideas and indignation [Burleigh] revives the model of totalitarianism, popular in the 1950s and 1960s, to explain how the Third Reich worked.... He also deploys to great effect the idea that National Socialism was a political religion, with Hitler posing as the messiah offering redemption to a fallen nation [...].

The BBC said the book "is indeed a blunt and radical re-examination of the Third Reich".

Publishers Weekly wrote,

Burleigh... focuses on the moral breakdown that gave Hitler control of an industrial society, which then, along with the rest of the world, suffered the catastrophic consequences. Though the topic is not new, the treatment is first-rate, making this indeed a new history.

== Award and honours ==
Burleigh's book, The Third Reich: A New History (2000) won the Samuel Johnson Prize for Non-Fiction in 2001. His book Small Wars, Far Away Places: The Genesis of the Modern World 1945–65 (2013) was longlisted for the same prize in 2014.

The television documentary Selling Murder: The Killing Films of the Third Reich (1991), won a British Film Institute Award for Archival Achievement. Meanwhile Heil Herbie: The Story of the Volkswagen Beetle (1993) won a New York Film and Television Festival Bronze Medal.

== Selected works ==
- Selling Murder: The Killing Films of the Third Reich. London: Domino Films
- Prussian Society and the German Order. Cambridge University Press, 1984 ISBN 9780521261043
- Germany Turns Eastwards: A Study of Ostforschung in the Third Reich. Cambridge University Press, 1988 ISBN 9780521351201
- The Racial State: Germany 1933–1945 – with Wolfgang Wippermann. Cambridge University Press, 1991 ISBN 9780521391146
- Death and Deliverance: "Euthanasia" in Germany 1900–1945. Cambridge University Press, 1994 ISBN 9780521477697
- Ethics and Extermination: Reflections on Nazi Genocide. Cambridge University Press, 1997 ISBN 9780521582117
- (editor) Confronting the Nazi Past: New Debates on Modern German History (Palgrave Macmillan, 1996) ISBN 9780312163532
- The Third Reich: A New History. Macmillan, 2000 ISBN 9780809093267
- Earthly Powers: Religion and Politics in Europe from the French Revolution to the Great War. HarperCollins, 2005 ISBN 0-00-719572-9
- Sacred Causes: Religion and Politics from the European Dictators to Al Qaeda. HarperCollins, 2006 ISBN 978-0-00-719574-9
  - Causas sagradas: Religión y política en Europa. De la Primera Guerra Mundial al terrorismo islami (TAURUS, 2006)
- Blood and Rage: A Cultural History of Terrorism. Harper Collins, 2008 ISBN 9780061173868
- Moral Combat: A History of World War II. Harper, 2010 ISBN 978-0-00-719576-3
- Small Wars, Far Away Places: The Genesis of the Modern World 1945–65. Viking Press, 2013 (Note: In the US as Small Wars, Faraway Places: Global Insurrection and the Making of the Modern World, 1945–65 ISBN 9780143125952)
  - Pequeñas guerras, lugares remotos: Insurrección global y la génesis del mundo moderno (TAURUS, 2014)
- Day of the Assassins: A History of Political Assassination. Picador, 2021. ISBN 978-1-52-903013-6 ISBN 978-1-76-098619-3 ISBN 978-1-52-903015-0 ISBN 978-1-52-903014-3
- Populism: Before and After the Pandemic (Hurst, 2021) ISBN 9781787384682
