= Max (2002 film) =

2002 film by Menno Meyjes

- Theatrical release poster
- Directed by: Menno Meyjes
- Written by: Menno Meyjes
- Produced by: Andras Hamori
- Starring: John Cusack; Noah Taylor; Leelee Sobieski; Molly Parker
- Cinematography: Lajos Koltai
- Edited by: Chris Wyatt
- Music by: Dan Jones
- Production companies: UK Film Council; Kinowelt Medien; Aconit Pictures; H2O Motion Pictures
- Distributed by: Pathé Distribution (United Kingdom); Alliance Atlantis Releasing (Canada)
- Release dates: 10 September 2002 (TIFF); 20 June 2003 (United Kingdom); 25 September 2003 (Hungary)
- Running time: 109 minutes
- Countries: Canada; Hungary; United Kingdom
- Language: English
- Box office: $539,879

Max is a 2002 drama film written and directed by Menno Meyjes in his directorial debut. The film stars John Cusack, Noah Taylor, Leelee Sobieski, and Molly Parker. Its plot depicts a fictional friendship between Jewish art dealer Max Rothman and a young Austrian painter, Adolf Hitler; more of which explores Hitler's views that begin to take shape as the Nazi ideology while also studying the artistic and design implications of the Third Reich. It goes on to study the question of what could have been had Hitler been accepted as an artist.

== Plot ==
In 1918, Max Rothman (John Cusack), a Munich art dealer, is a World War I veteran who lost his right arm in the Third Battle of Ypres, effectively ending his career as a painter. He returns to Germany and opens a modern art gallery. He is married to Nina (Molly Parker), but also has a mistress, Liselore von Peltz (Leelee Sobieski). Through a chance encounter, Rothman is approached by a young Adolf Hitler (Noah Taylor), a war veteran as well, disgruntled over Germany's loss during the conflict and the country's humiliation by the signing of the Versailles Treaty. Hitler is also an aspiring painter, and wishes to have his artwork displayed.

Rothman comes to believe that Hitler has talent, but has failed to tap his inner potential to create great art. While Rothman is aware of his new protégé's antisemitism, he feels sorry for Hitler, who had nothing to come home to after the war, and encourages him to delve deeper in his art. Despite his overall doubts about Hitler, Rothman agrees to take some of his paintings under a contractual basis.

Meanwhile, Reichswehr officer Captain Karl Mayr (Ulrich Thomsen), sees Hitler give an antisemitic speech to uninterested passersby, and encourages him to go into politics and make a career out of propaganda. During a brief conversation in an army barracks, Mayr also offers to financially support Hitler by having the army pay his expenses, further enticing Hitler to join his national socialist movement, the German Workers' Party.

Later, Rothman begins to question Hitler's motives regarding his racial views. During a conversation with Rothman, Hitler denies being antisemitic and says that, on the contrary, he grudgingly admires Jews for their "blood purity". He goes on to state that the German people would be better off if they did not integrate themselves with different races. Seeing Hitler's architectural sketches, with their appeal to a romanticized national greatness, Rothman realizes this is where Hitler's talent lies, and that it would be far less dangerous if confined to art galleries. Hitler is thrilled by Rothman's enthusiasm, not understanding it is partly motivated by fear of what he might become.

Rothman and Hitler arrange to meet that evening to discuss Hitler's future projects, and after making a violently antisemitic speech to a group of supporters at a rally—with Mayr's backing—Hitler goes to a cafe to discuss a series of new militaristic drawings with Rothman. As Rothman approaches the cafe for his meeting with Hitler, he is savagely beaten by a group of antisemites who had attended Hitler's rally and been incited to violence by his words. As Rothman lies dying, an angry Hitler leaves the cafe, believing that Rothman has stood him up.

== Cast ==
- John Cusack as Max Rothman
- Noah Taylor as Adolf Hitler
- Leelee Sobieski as Liselore von Peltz
- Molly Parker as Nina Rothman
- Ulrich Thomsen as Karl Mayr
- Kevin McKidd as George Grosz
- Peter Capaldi as David Cohn

== Production ==
=== Filming ===
The film was written and directed by screenwriter Menno Meyjes. When Meyjes was shopping the script around Hollywood, he first approached Amblin Entertainment for funding. As part of helping to finance the film, star John Cusack agreed to take no salary for his lead role. Steven Spielberg, for whom Meyjes had produced the Oscar and BAFTA-nominated script adaptation of The Color Purple, told him that he felt the script was well written, but he would personally feel uncomfortable funding the film without insulting the memory of Holocaust survivors. He encouraged Meyjes to make the film, but without support from Amblin. Filming locations included Amsterdam, Netherlands and Budapest, Hungary as backdrops for early 20th century Germany.

== Response ==
=== Critical reception ===
Critics gave generally favorable reviews to the film. On the review aggregator website Rotten Tomatoes, it currently has a rating of 69%, based on 110 reviews, and an average rating of 6.4/10. The website's consensus reads, "Well-acted in the execution of its provocative "what-if?" premise." Metacritic assigned the film a weighted average score of 56 out of 100, based on 30 critics, indicating "mixed or average reviews".

The Guardian's Peter Bradshaw praised the film's "clever and plausible propositions about career and destiny." while The Observer's Mark Kermode described it as, "Far from faultless ... but praiseworthy for its chutzpah, this rumbustious affair provokes both serious consideration and light-hearted appreciation." Roger Ebert for the Chicago Sun-Times remarked that, "To ponder Hitler's early years with the knowledge of his later ones is to understand how life can play cosmic tricks with tragic results."

Alternatively, Peter Travers of Rolling Stone described a remark made by the character Rothman – "You're an awfully hard man to like, Hitler" – saying, "Few serious films could survive a line like that. Max certainly doesn't." Kenneth Turan of the Los Angeles Times similarly commented "it fritters away its potentially interesting subject matter via a banal script, unimpressive acting and indifferent direction." Gossip blogger Roger Friedman was criticized by Mica Rosenberg of the Jewish Telegraphic Agency for writing a review of the film even though he had never seen it, but had only read an advance copy of the screenplay.

== Release ==
=== Home media ===
The Region 1 Code widescreen edition of the film was released on DVD in the U.S. on 20 May 2003. Special features include interviews with the cast and crew as well as an audio commentary on the entire film with director Menno Meyjes.

=== Box-office ===
The film grossed $539,879 in 37 theaters during its 15-week American release.
