= Constantine's Sword =

2001 history book by James Carroll

Constantine's Sword: The Church and the Jews: A History
- Author: James Carroll
- Language: English
- Genre: Non-fiction
- Published: 2001
- Publisher: Mariner Books (Houghton Mifflin)
- Publication place: United States
- Pages: xii + 756
- ISBN: 0395779278
- OCLC: 44727744
- LC Class: BM535 .C37 2001

Constantine's Sword: The Church and the Jews: A History (2001) is a book by James Carroll, a former priest, which documents the role of the Roman Catholic Church in the long European history of religious antisemitism as a precursor to racial antisemitism. The primary source of anti-Jewish violence is the perennial obsession with converting the Jews to Christianity; an event which some theologians believed would usher in the Second Coming.

== Description ==
Carroll disclaims the notion that Christian anti-Judaism leads inevitably to the Holocaust committed by Nazi Germany, but he argues that Church's long history of "Jew-hatred" laid the foundation for Hitler's crimes. Carroll also points out the many "turning points," as he labels them, where the Church's attitudes and actions toward Jews could have been shifted. Just one example cited in the book is that of Pierre Abelard (1079–1142), the French theologian and philosopher, whose teachings, had they been accepted, would have radically changed the direction and cast of Christian dogma.

The book also analyzes, in detail, the actions of numerous popes and other prominent figures of Catholic Church history, especially those who advocated anti-Jewish policies and those who tried to rein in official antisemitism, including St. Augustine, Bernard of Clairvaux, Nicholas of Cusa, Innocent III, Paul IV, Pius IX, Pius XII, John XXIII, and John Paul II.

The book's title refers to Constantine's transformation of the cross, which Carroll claims, was not a symbol used by Christians in the first three centuries of the Church's existence, into a symbolic sword infusing a spirit of violent intolerance into the development of Christianity.

A documentary film based on the book was shown at film festivals in August 2007. Although exploring the same themes as the book, the documentary also focuses on events which occurred subsequent to the book's publication, especially the controversy surrounding evangelical proselytizing at the United States Air Force Academy. The movie was directed by Oren Jacoby, who is also listed as a producer, and written by James Carroll and Oren Jacoby. It was released by the production company, Storyville Films.

== Awards ==
- 2002: National Jewish Book Award in Jewish History

== See also ==
- Political theology
- Pontifical Commission for Religious Relations with the Jews
- Pope John Paul II and Judaism
- David Nirenberg § Anti-Judaism: The Western Tradition
