= Gemlich letter =

Letter written by Adolf Hitler in 1919

The Gemlich letter was written by Adolf Hitler at the behest of Karl Mayr to Adolf Gemlich, a German Army soldier. The letter, written 16th September 1919 in response to a request for clarification on the Jewish question, is thought to be the first known piece of antisemitic writing by Hitler, and the first political piece by Hitler. Because the letter is the first record of Hitler's antisemitic views, and because it brought Hitler into politics, it is considered an important document in Holocaust studies.

In the letter, Hitler argues that antisemitism should be based on facts, Jews were a race and not a religious group, and that the aim for the government "must be the total removal of all Jews from our midst". Hitler also called for a "rational antisemitism" which would not resort to pogroms or senseless violence. He instead called for action to "legally fight and remove the privileges enjoyed by the Jews as opposed to other foreigners living among us. Its final goal, however, must be the irrevocable removal of the Jews themselves". In the letter, Hitler blames Jews for the German revolution of 1918–1919.

== History ==
Hitler, who remained in the German Army after the First World War, returned to Munich in September 1919. Assigned to an intelligence and propaganda unit of the Reichswehr which was run by Mayr, Hitler was ordered to draft a response to Gemlich's question on the army's position on the Jewish question. Hitler's response, dated 16 September 1919, was either written by him or dictated by him and subsequently typed by another. Two copies of the letter are thought to exist. One is in the Bavarian state archives in Munich which is typewritten but unsigned, and the second is at the Simon Wiesenthal Center, also typewritten but signed by Hitler. The second version, now believed to be the original, was discovered in a Nuremberg archive by a U.S. Army soldier, William F. Ziegler, who brought it to the United States, where it ended up in a private collection. In 1990, Charles Hamilton, the handwriting expert, authenticated the signature on the letter and, in 2011 it was purchased by the Simon Wiesenthal Center for $150,000.
