= Karl Mayr =

Reichswehr officer

- Born: 5 January 1883; Mindelheim, German Empire
- Died: 9 February 1945 (aged 62); Buchenwald concentration camp, Weimar, Nazi Germany
- Military career
- Allegiance: German Empire; Weimar Republic
- Branch: Imperial German Army; Reichsheer
- Service years: 1901–1920
- Rank: Captain
- Unit: Army Intelligence Division
- Commands: 1st Bavarian Jägerbattailon
- Conflicts: World War I

Captain Karl Mayr (5 January 1883 – 9 February 1945) was a German General Staff officer and Adolf Hitler's immediate superior in an Army Intelligence Division in the Reichswehr, 1919–1920. Mayr was particularly known as the man who introduced Hitler to politics. In 1919, Mayr directed Hitler to write the Gemlich letter, in which Hitler first expressed his antisemitic views in writing.

Mayr later became Hitler's opponent, and wrote in his memoirs that General Erich Ludendorff had personally ordered him to have Hitler join the German Workers' Party (DAP) and build it up. As far as it is known, his last rank was major. In 1933, he fled to France after the Nazis came to national power. Mayr was tracked down by the Gestapo, arrested, imprisoned, and later murdered at the Buchenwald Concentration Camp in 1945.

A fact-based portrayal of Mayr is dramatized in the 2002 film Max, a fictional account of Hitler's life in Munich just prior to joining the German Workers' Party.

== Life and work ==
Mayr was the son of a magistrate. After graduating from high school, he was enrolled on 14 July 1901 in the 1st Bavarian Infantry Regiment in Munich as a cadet. Well regarded by his superiors, he made rapid progress, becoming Leutnant in 1903 and Oberleutnant in 1911.

From August 1914 Mayr was with the 1st Bayerischen Jägerbattailon. During the First World War he was in combat in Lorraine and Flanders and involved in early 1915 with the German Alpine Corps. On 1 June 1915 Mayr was promoted to Hauptmann (captain). In 1917, he was named on the General Staff of the Alpine Corps. On 13 March 1918 he was appointed commander of the 1st Bavarian Jägerbattailon, with whom he served in the Eastern Army Group in Turkey from 20 July to 15 October 1918.

Shortly after the war, from 1 December 1918, Mayr acted as company commander in the 1st Bavarian Infantry Regiment in Munich. On 15 February 1919 he was on leave from the military, but returned in May as commander of the 6th Battalion of the guards regiment in Munich and from 30 May as head of the "Education and Propaganda Department" of the General Command von Oven and the Group Command No. 4 (Department Ib) under Lieutenant-General von Möhl.

In his capacity as head of the intelligence department, Mayr recruited Adolf Hitler as an undercover agent in early June 1919. Hitler's role involved informing on soldiers suspected of communist sympathies. Hitler took part in "national thinking" courses at the Reichswehrlager Lechfeld near Augsburg which were organized by the Bavarian Reichswehr under Captain Mayr. Mayr believed demoralized and Bolshevized forces should be taught national sentiments. After this training Mayr issued Hitler the order to become "anti-Bolshevik educational speaker" to the soldiers at the Munich barracks. Furthermore, Hitler was sent as an observer to the numerous meetings of the various newly formed political parties in Munich. Hitler spent much time at the meetings and wrote reports on the political ideas, goals and methods of the groups. This included studying the activities of the DAP (German Workers' Party). Hitler became impressed with founder Anton Drexler's antisemitic, nationalist, anti-capitalist and anti-Marxist ideas. Drexler was impressed with Hitler's oratory skills and invited him to join the DAP, which Hitler accepted on 12 September 1919. After attending a further meeting on 3 October, Hitler stated to Mayr in his report "must join this club or party, as these were the thoughts of the soldiers from the front-line".

Historian Thomas Weber described the obscurity and secrecy behind the relationship between Hitler and Karl Mayr during the years of 1919 and 1920:

Piece by piece, the picture that has conclusively emerged by putting all the surviving pieces of evidence together is the image of a Private Hitler who was shunned by most of the front-line soldiers as a 'rear area pig', and who was still unsure of his political ideology at the end of the war in 1918. The view of the List Regiment as a band of brothers, with Hitler a hero at its heart, has its origins in Nazi propaganda, not in reality. The First World War did not 'make' Hitler. Even the revolutionary period seems to have had a far less immediate impact on Hitler's politicization than hitherto assumed. Central for Hitler's radicalization was thus the post-revolutionary period, a time when he was still surrounded by people like Ernst Schmidt and Karl Mayr, who like him possessed fluctuating political attitudes. This period in Hitler's life is still clouded in much secrecy.

In March 1920, Mayr sent Hitler, Dietrich Eckart and Robert Ritter von Greim to Berlin to observe at close range the events of the Kapp Putsch. On 8 July 1920, Mayr was released from military service as a major of the General Staff of the military district commands VII, but reappeared in September 1920 as commander of Section I b/P of army intelligence. Mayr in 1921 was a Nazi Party supporter, but later became a critic. In 1925 he joined the SPD. Subsequently, he was the leader and editor of the Reichsbanner Schwarz-Rot-Gold, an SPD paramilitary force. In the early 1930s, Mayr collected among other things, information on Georg Bell, an associate of Ernst Röhm, and other material against the Nazi Party, which he leaked in the Social Democratic press. After Adolf Hitler's rise to power in 1933, Karl Mayr fled to France. After the German invasion of France in 1940, he was arrested in Paris by the Gestapo. Mayr was taken back to Germany and was incarcerated in Sachsenhausen concentration camp until 1943, when he was transferred to Buchenwald concentration camp and forced to work at the Gustloff ammunition plant, where on 9 February 1945 he was killed.

== Sources ==
- Kershaw, Ian (2008). Hitler: A Biography. New York: W. W. Norton & Company. ISBN 978-0-393-06757-6.
- Ziemann, Benjamin (1999). "The best of two worlds – the military critics and opponents of a resolute pacifism retired Major Karl Mayr (1883–1945)". In Wette, Wolfram (ed.). Pacifist officers in Germany from 1871 to 1933. pp. 273–285.
