= James Carroll (author) =

American journalist (born 1943)

- Born: January 22, 1943 (age 83) Chicago, Illinois, U.S.
- Occupation: Former Catholic priest, novelist, journalist
- Genre: Fiction, history, religion, politics
- Spouse: Alexandra Marshall (m. 1977)
- Children: 2

Ecclesiastical career
- Religion: Christianity
- Church: Catholic Church
- Ordained: 1969
- Laicized: 1974

James Carroll (born January 22, 1943) is an American author, historian, journalist, and former Catholic priest. He has written extensively about the contemporary effort to reform the Catholic Church, and has published not only novels, but also books on religion and history. He has received nine honorary doctorates, and is a fellow of the American Academy of Arts and Sciences.

== Youth, education, and service as a priest ==
Carroll was born in Chicago, the second of five sons of late U.S. Air Force General Joseph F. Carroll, and his wife Mary. At the time, his father was a Special Agent of the FBI, which he remained until being seconded to, and later commissioned by, the U.S. Air Force as the first commander of the U.S. Air Force Office of Special Investigations in 1948. After this, Carroll was raised in the Washington, D.C., area and in Germany. He was educated at Washington's Priory School (now St. Anselm's Abbey School) and at an American high school (H.H. Arnold), in Wiesbaden, Germany. He attended Georgetown University before entering St. Paul's College, the Paulist Fathers' seminary, where he received his B.A. and M.A. degrees.

He was ordained to the priesthood in 1969. Carroll served as Catholic chaplain at Boston University from 1969 to 1974. During that time, he studied poetry with George Starbuck and published books on religious subjects and a book of poems. He was also a columnist for the National Catholic Reporter (1972–1975) and was named Best Columnist by the Catholic Press Association. For his writing against the Vietnam War, he received the first Thomas Merton Award from Pittsburgh's Thomas Merton Center in 1972. Carroll left the priesthood and the Paulist Fathers in 1974 to become a writer, and, in the same year, was a playwright-in-residence at the Berkshire Theater Festival.

== Literary career ==
Carroll's plays have been produced at the Berkshire Theater Festival and at Boston's Next Move Theater. In 1976, he published his first novel, Madonna Red, which was followed by ten others. He has written for numerous publications, including The New Yorker and The Atlantic. His op-ed column appeared weekly in The Boston Globe for twenty-three years (1992-2015). He won the 1996 National Book Award for Nonfiction for An American Requiem: God, My Father, and the War That Came Between Us, a memoir about the Vietnam War and his relationships with his father, the American military, and the Catholic Church.

His other books include House of War: The Pentagon and the Disastrous Rise of American Power, which won the first PEN/John Kenneth Galbraith Award for non-fiction. Mr. Carroll's other works include the novels 'Prince of Peace, Mortal Friends and Family Trade,' which were New York Times bestsellers. His novels The City Below and Secret Father were NYT Notable Books. His book of poems, Forbidden Disappointments, appearing in 1974, announced, according to the critic Allan Tate, "a new, original talent." His writing against the Iraq war, Crusade: Chronicles of an Unjust War, (2004), was greeted by Jonathan Schell as "a journalist page of glory."

Carroll has been a Shorenstein Fellow at Harvard Kennedy School at Harvard University and a Fellow at the Center for the Study of Values in Public Life at the Harvard Divinity School. He was a trustee of the Boston Public Library, a member of the Advisory Board of the International Center for Ethics, Justice, and Public Life at Brandeis University, and a member of the Dean's Council at the Harvard Divinity School. Carroll is a Fellow of the American Academy of Arts and Sciences, and was a member of the Academy's Committee on International Security Studies. He worked on his 2006 history of the Pentagon, House of War, as a Scholar-in-Residence at the Academy. He is an Associate of the Mahindra Humanities Center at Harvard University. Carroll was the Richman Visiting Professor at Brandeis University, the MacDonald Family Visiting Professor at Emory University, Distinguished Scholar-in-Residence at Suffolk University in Boston, and Distinguished Writer-in-Residence at New York University, where he wrote his most recent novel The Cloister (2017).

== Constantine's Sword ==
Carroll wrote a history of Christianity, specifically Roman Catholicism, anti-Semitism, and treatment of Jews, titled Constantine's Sword: The Church and the Jews (2001). In this book, he recounts—beginning with the Gospels—the long history of anti-Jewish contempt and argues that Christian anti-Judaism spawned racial anti-Semitism, eventually underwriting white supremacy and playing a key role in the coming of the Holocaust.

Constantine's Sword, a New York Times bestseller, is considered by some Jewish outlets to be a classic study of Christian anti-Semitism: It won the National Jewish Book Award, the Melcher Award, and the James Parks Morton Interfaith Award.

Others, mostly Catholic outlets, have criticized the book, including Eamon Duffy in the New York Review of Books, Daniel Maloney in the National Review, Eugene Fisher in America, Thomas F.X. Noble in First Things, John Silber in Bostonia, and Ronald J. Rychlak in the Washington Post.

Carroll co-wrote and presented the 2007 documentary Constantine's Sword with filmmaker Oren Jacoby. It was named a Critics' Pick by the New York Times.

== "Abolish the Priesthood" ==
In a 2019 cover article for The Atlantic, Carroll responded to the ongoing scandal of Roman Catholic priestly sex abuse by advocating the abolition of the priesthood to “return the Church to the people.” Carroll carries this argument further in his 2021 memoir The Truth at the Heart of the Lie: How the Catholic Church Lost Its Soul.

== Family ==
Carroll married the novelist Alexandra Marshall in 1977. They have two grown children.

== Bibliography ==
=== Books ===
- Forbidden Disappointments (1974) (poems)
- The Winter Name of God (1975)
- Madonna Red (1976) (novel)
- Mortal Friends: A Novel (1978)
- Fault Lines (1980) (novel)
- Family Trade (1982) (novel)
- Prince of Peace (1984) (novel)
- Supply of Heroes (1986) (novel)
- Firebird (1989) (novel)
- Memorial Bridge (1991) (novel)
- The City Below (1994) (novel)
- An American Requiem: God, My Father, and the War That Came Between Us (1996)
- Constantine's Sword: The Church and the Jews – A History (2001). ISBN 978-0-395-77927-9
- Toward a New Catholic Church: The Promise of Reform (2002). ISBN 978-0-618-31337-2
- Secret Father: A Novel (2003). ISBN 978-0-618-15284-1
- Crusade: Chronicles of an Unjust War (2004). ISBN 978-0-8050-7843-5
- House of War: The Pentagon and the Disastrous Rise of American Power (2006). ISBN 978-0-618-18780-5
- Practicing Catholic (2009). ISBN 978-0-618-67018-5
- Jerusalem, Jerusalem (2011). ISBN 978-0-547-54905-7
- Warburg in Rome (2014), {(ISBN) 978-0-547-73800-1)}
- Christ Actually (2014). ISBN 978-0-670-78603-9
- The Cloister (2018). (novel) ISBN 978-0-385-54127-5
- The Truth at the Heart of the Lie (2021)

=== Articles ===
- Carroll, James (December 23–30, 2013). "Profiles: Who am I to Judge?". The New Yorker. Vol. 89, no. 42. pp. 81–91.

== See also ==
- Baruch Plan
