= Gerald Fleming (historian) =

German-British historian

Gerald Fleming, born Gerhard Flehinger (May 11, 1921 - February 25, 2006) was a German-British historian.

== Early life and education ==
Gerhard Flehinger was born in Mannheim. In 1927, he moved with his family to Baden-Baden.

In the summer of 1935, he and his brother were sent to England where they studied at King's College, Taunton. Both brothers spoke no English when they arrived in England.

== Career ==
Fleming retired from Surrey University in 1982. In his retirement, he dedicated himself to Holocaust research.

In 1984, His book Hitler and the Final Solution was published. The book contained evidence from his extensive work in archives that demonstrated the culpability of the Nazi leadership in the planning and managing of the Holocaust.

Some of his research was done in archives in Riga, Latvia in 1982, when the country was still part of the Soviet Union. The country’s Jewish population of 90,000 was largely eliminated during the German occupation.

== Awards and honors ==
In 1993, he was awarded an honorary doctorate and made a master of the University of Surrey.

== Personal life ==
With his wife Winnie he had two daughters.

== Books ==
- Hitler and the Final Solution (1984)
