= Silent Holocaust =

The Silent Holocaust may refer to:

- Silent Holocaust (Judaism)
- Jewish assimilation § Contemporary debate
- Guatemalan genocide
