= Oren Jacoby =

American film director

Oren Jacoby is a director and producer of documentary films.

== Life and career ==
Jacoby was educated at Brown University and Yale University. He has been an independent filmmaker since 1992, and was nominated for an Academy Award for Best Documentary Short Subject in 2005 for Sister Rose's Passion, which also won Best Documentary Short Film at the 2004 Tribeca Film Festival.

In September 2014, he released My Italian Secret: The Forgotten Heroes, a feature-length documentary about unsung heroes in World War II Italy. Jacoby’s stage adaptation of Ralph Ellison’s Invisible Man was produced in Washington and Boston in 2012–13. It won a Jefferson Award for best New Play adaptation and 4 Helen Hayes Awards in 2013.

== Filmography ==
- My Italian Secret: The Forgotten Heroes (2014)
- Shadowman (2017)
- On Broadway (2019)
- Julia (2021)
- This is Not a Drill (2025)

== Personal life ==
He is married to fellow documentary filmmaker Betsy West.
