= Wolfgang Wippermann =

German historian (1945–2021)

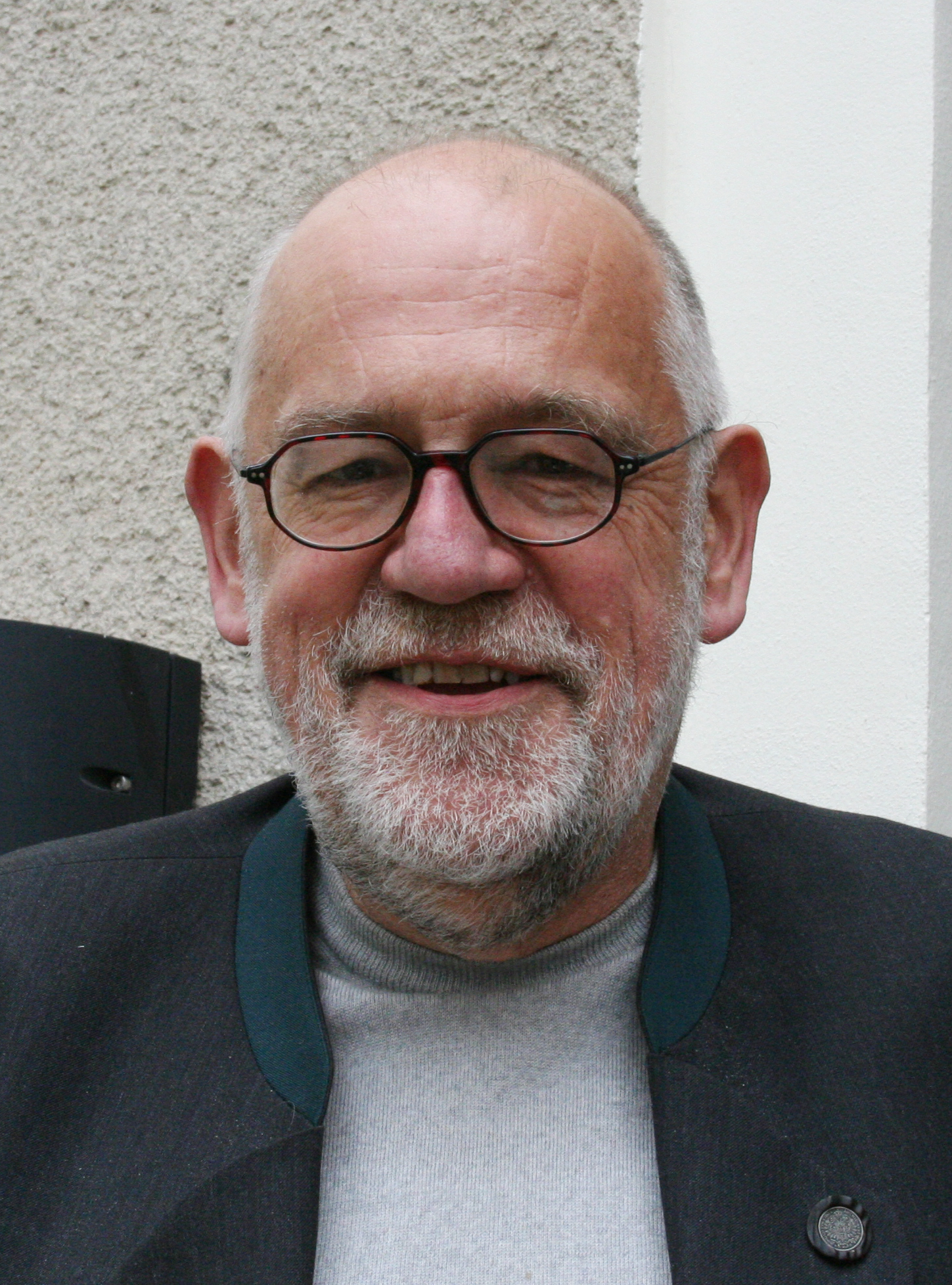
- Wolfgang Wippermann in 2010
- Born: 29 January 1945
- Died: 3 January 2021 (aged 75)

Academic background
- Education: University of Göttingen; University of Marburg; Free University of Berlin

Academic work
- Institutions: Free University of Berlin; Berlin University of the Arts

Wolfgang Wippermann (29 January 1945 – 3 January 2021) was a German historian. He served as supernumerary professor of modern history at the Friedrich Meinecke Institute of the Free University of Berlin, and also taught at the Berlin University of the Arts and the Fachhochschule Potsdam. Wippermann studied history, German and political science in Göttingen and Marburg and received his doctorate from the Free University of Berlin.

As professor at the Friedrich Meinecke Institute, his main research interests were ideologies, especially fascism, antiziganism, communism, and antisemitism. His positions as an historian were controversial: he saw himself as the only historian defending Daniel Goldhagen in the debate surrounding his book Hitler's Willing Executioners.
