= Georges Vacher de Lapouge =

French anthropologist

- Born: 12 December 1854; Neuville-de-Poitou, Vienne
- Died: 20 February 1936 (aged 81); Poitiers, Vienne
- Known for: Anthroposociology
- Spouse: Marie-Albertine Hindré
- Children: Claude Vacher de Lapouge

Count Georges Vacher de Lapouge (French: [vaʃe də lapuʒ]; 12 December 1854 – 20 February 1936) was a French anthropologist and a theoretician of eugenics and scientific racism. He is known as the founder of anthroposociology, the anthropological and sociological study of race as a means of establishing the superiority of certain peoples.

== Biography ==
While a young law student at the University of Poitiers, Vacher de Lapouge read Herbert Spencer and Charles Darwin. In 1879 he gained a doctorate degree in law and became a magistrate in Niort (Deux-Sèvres) and a prosecutor in Le Blanc. He then studied history and philology at the École pratique des hautes études, and learned several languages such as Akkadian, Egyptian, Hebrew, Chinese, and Japanese at the École du Louvre and at School of Anthropology in Paris from 1883 to 1886.

From 1886 Vacher de Lapouge taught anthropology at the University of Montpellier, advocating Francis Galton's eugenic thesis, but was expelled in 1892 because of his socialist activities (he co-founded Jules Guesde's French Workers' Party's section in Montpellier and campaigned during 1888 for city mayor in the Montpellier municipal election). He worked later as a librarian at the University of Rennes until his retirement in 1922.

== Work and legacy ==
De Lapouge wrote L'Aryen: son Rôle Social (1899, "The Aryan: His Social Role"), in which he opposed the Aryan, dolichocephalic races to the brachycephalic races. Ostensibly within the former, he further categorized: first the Homo europaeus, Nordic or fair-haired, then the Homo alpinus, represented by the Auvergnat and Turkic peoples, finally the Homo mediterraneus, represented by the Neapoletan or Andaluz peoples.

Vacher de Lapouge endorsed Francis Galton's theory of eugenics, but applied it to his theory of races. Vacher de Lapouge's ideas are comparable to those of Henri de Boulainvilliers (1658–1722), who believed that the Germanic Franks formed the upper class of French society, whereas the Gauls were the ancestors of the peasantry. Race, according to him, thus became almost synonymous with social class. Vacher de Lapouge added to this concept of races and classes what he termed selectionism, his version of Galton's eugenics. Vacher de Lapouge's anthropology was intended to prevent social conflict by defining a fixed, hierarchical social order.

In 1926, he prefaced and translated Madison Grant's publication The Passing of the Great Race (Le Déclin de la Grande Race, Payot, 1926). He also translated one work of Ernst Haeckel into French.

Lapouge had a direct influence on National Socialist racial and eugenic doctrine. In his "political science" works he described the Jew as the only competitor of the Aryan, who dominated lesser races without them knowing. Lapouge in 1887 had predicted that the 20th century would witness genocides that slaughtered millions over their alleged racial differences, though he was not saying this should occur. He wrote of "anti-morality" (moral nihilism), along with proposing a totalitarian "selectionist" state that would strictly enforce racist eugenics. Anthropologist Hans F. K. Gunther praised his work and eulogized him when Lapouge died. Lapouge in turn championed Gunther's cause to become a chair of "anthroposociology" at the University of Jena. Indeed, most of Lapouge's followers were Germans, which caused ironic tension given their old German-French rivalry. Some also felt discomfort at his fervent atheism and materialism, but this did not stop them from adopting his eugenicist and racial ideas. They also disliked his idea that sperm from the most "fit" men should be used to impregnate many women artificially.

Lapouge firmly maintained heredity and selection were the only biological forces that affected the human race. His view was that education had no lasting effect on character, as this was a racial, fixed characteristic. Lapouge maintained that racial "cross breeding" always diminished the superior race. Various types of "social selection" as Lapouge called it also affected the human race, often negatively for the so-called Aryan race. Lapouge identified these as political, military, religious, moral, legal and economic selection. They all in different ways he thought had a dysgenic effect on the Aryans. He predicted that, if not halted, this social selection inevitably would lead to European civilization collapsing. For combating this, Lapouge willingly supported eugenic abortion, polygamy and even incest. He even suggested giving the poor free alcohol in hopes this would kill them off by excessive drinking. Lapouge's ideal society was ruled by a strict, segregated elite racial caste. He wholly opposed Enlightenment values, denouncing democracy and individual rights. These views have been assessed as inconsistent, as Lapouge maintained biological traits were the source of Aryan superiority, with any social factors helpless to uplift anyone he held to be inferior, yet conversely the Aryans were in his view degenerating because of social factors at the same time.

Lapouge's work spurred a strong reaction on the political left in France, since it was seen as undermining the democratic Enlightenment values which they cherished with science, generally deemed their friend (he had repudiated the Revolutionary slogan "Liberty, Equality, Fraternity", saying this should be replaced with "Determinism, Inequality, Selection"). Lapouge had initially been on the political left but gravitated to the right over time, and held great contempt for other atheists who did not share his convictions, claiming they clung to a theistic-based morality which no longer held. His work left secular leftists with a quandary, since they cited science (some of the same as Lapouge) to advance their own views, though his were opposed to theirs. Anthropologists who shared their views attacked Lapouge's theories, along with the racist and sexist ideas common in anthropology then generally. However, this was not enough for many opponents of Lapouge. They feared that if science were upheld as determining social values, the threat his theories posed (or similar ones) would always exist. French leftists thus increasingly rejected taking science as a source of any political truths. It was argued Enlightenment democratic, egalitarian ideals should be upheld no matter what science said. Equal rights should belong to citizens even assuming any biological disparities that existed between them, they insisted. Increasingly, leftists were driven to debunking racist and sexist claims from anthropology in reaction to claims by Lapouge (among others) given the threat views like his posed to their values. Lapouge complained bitterly of this, and particularly hated one critic who was Jewish, saying his theories had been rejected because of French Jews' influence.

=== Future ===
Vacher de Lapouge outlined the logistic growth of empires from the Bronze Age till his days, when six states govern three quarters of the globe, and stated the impossibility of an indefinite continuation of this trend in a definite space:

This is a historic law that the nations tend to become endlessly greater... Since the surface of the globe is limited, the time has come when there is no longer a place on the periphery of the civilized world for the formation of new giant nations, and there are no longer civilized regions where they can form out of small nations. The moment is close when the struggle for the domination of the world is going to take place... The struggle... of the future will not be the joy of kings or the caprices of peoples, but the necessary consequence of the needs of nations at crossroad... We conclude thinking about human hecatombs which the future reserves. The struggle among the contenders for universal domination will be long and necessarily merciless.

He bet on the United States in the forthcoming struggle for the world domination:

The reign of Europe is over, well over... The future of France seems less certain but it is unnecessary to become illusioned... I do not believe by the way that Germany might count for a much longer future... We could... envisage... the possibility that England and her immense Empire comes to surrender to the United States. The latter... is the true adversary of Russia in the great struggle to come ... I also believe that the United States is appealed to triumph. Otherwise, the universe will be Russian.

== Publications ==
- (1878). Essai Historique sur le Conseil Privé ou Conseil des Parties. Poitiers: Impr. de A. Dupré.
- (1879). Du Patrimoine en Droit Romain et en Droit Français. Poitiers: Impr. de Marcireau et Cie.
- (1879). Essais de Droit Positif Généralisé. Théorie du Patrimoine. Paris: Ernest Thorin.
- (1885). Études sur la Nature et sur l'Évolution Historique du Droit de Succession. Paris: Ernest Thorin.
- (1896). Les Sélections Sociales. Paris: Albert Fontemoing ("Social Selections").
- (1899). L'Aryen: Son Rôle Social. Paris: Albert Fontemoing ("The Aryan: his Social Role").
- (1909). Race et Milieu Social: Essais d'Anthroposociologie. Paris: Marcel Rivière ("Race and Social Background: Essays of Anthroposociology").

Articles

- (1886). "L'Hérédité," Revue d'Anthropologie 1, pp. 512–521.
- (1887). "La Dépopulation de la France," Revue d'Anthropologie 2 (1), pp. 69–80.
- (1887). "L'Anthropologie et la Science Politique," Revue d'Anthropologie 2 (2), pp. 136–157.
- (1887). "Les Sélections Sociale," Revue d'Anthropologie 2 (5), pp. 519–550.
- (1888). "De l'Inégalité Parmi les Hommes," Revue d'Anthropologie 3 (1), pp. 9–38.
- (1888). "L´Hérédité dans la Science Politique," Revue d'Anthropologie 3 (2), pp. 169–181.
- (1915). "Le Paradoxe Pangermaniste", Mercure de France, Tome 111, No. 416, pp. 640–654.
- (1923). "Dies Irae: La Fin du Monde Civilise," Europe 9 (October 1): 59-61.

Works in English translation

- (1905). "Natural Selection and Social Selection," in Sociology and Social Progress. Boston: Ginn & Company, pp. 647–653.
- (1927). "Contribution to the Fundamentals of a Policy of Population," The Eugenics Review 19 (3), 192-7.
- (1927). "The Numerous Families of Former Times," The Eugenics Review 19 (3), 198-202.
- (1928). "Race Studies in Europe," Eugenical News 13 (6), 82-84.
- (1928). "The Nordic Movement in Europe," Eugenical News 13 (10), 132-133.
- (1929). "Thoughts of Count of Lapouge," Eugenical News 14 (6), 78-80.
- (1930). "From Count de Lapouge," Eugenical News 15 (8), 116-117.
- (1932). "Post-War Immigration into France," Eugenical News 17 (4), 94-95.
- (1934). "A French View," Eugenical News 19 (2), 39-40.

== See also ==
- William Z. Ripley, The Races of Europe (1899)
