= Joseph Deniker =

Russian-French naturalist, librarian and anthropologist (1852–1918)

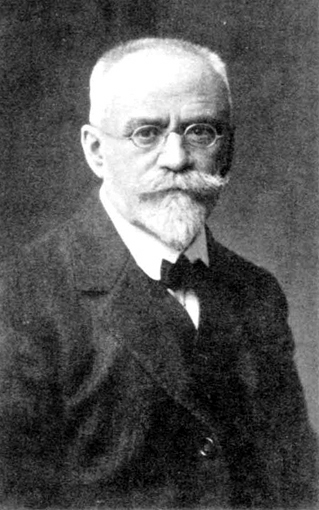
Joseph Deniker

Joseph Yegorovich Deniker (Russian: Иосиф Егорович Деникер, Yosif Yegorovich Deniker; 6 March 1852, in Astrakhan – 18 March 1918, in Paris) was a Russian-French naturalist and anthropologist, known primarily for his attempts to develop highly detailed maps of race in Europe.

== Life ==
Deniker was born in 1852 to French parents in Astrakhan, Russian Empire. He first studied at the university and technical institute of St. Petersburg, where he adopted engineering as a profession, and in this capacity, traveled extensively in the petroleum districts of the Caucasus, in Central Europe, Italy and Dalmatia. Settling in Paris, France in 1876, he studied at the Sorbonne, where he received a doctorate in natural science in 1886. In 1888 he was appointed chief librarian of the Natural History Museum in Paris.

Deniker became one of the chief editors of the Dictionnaire de geographie universelle, and published many papers in the anthropological and zoological journals of France. In 1904 he was invited by the Royal Anthropological Institute of Great Britain to give the Huxley Memorial Lecture. He died in Paris in 1918.

== Deniker's classification system ==
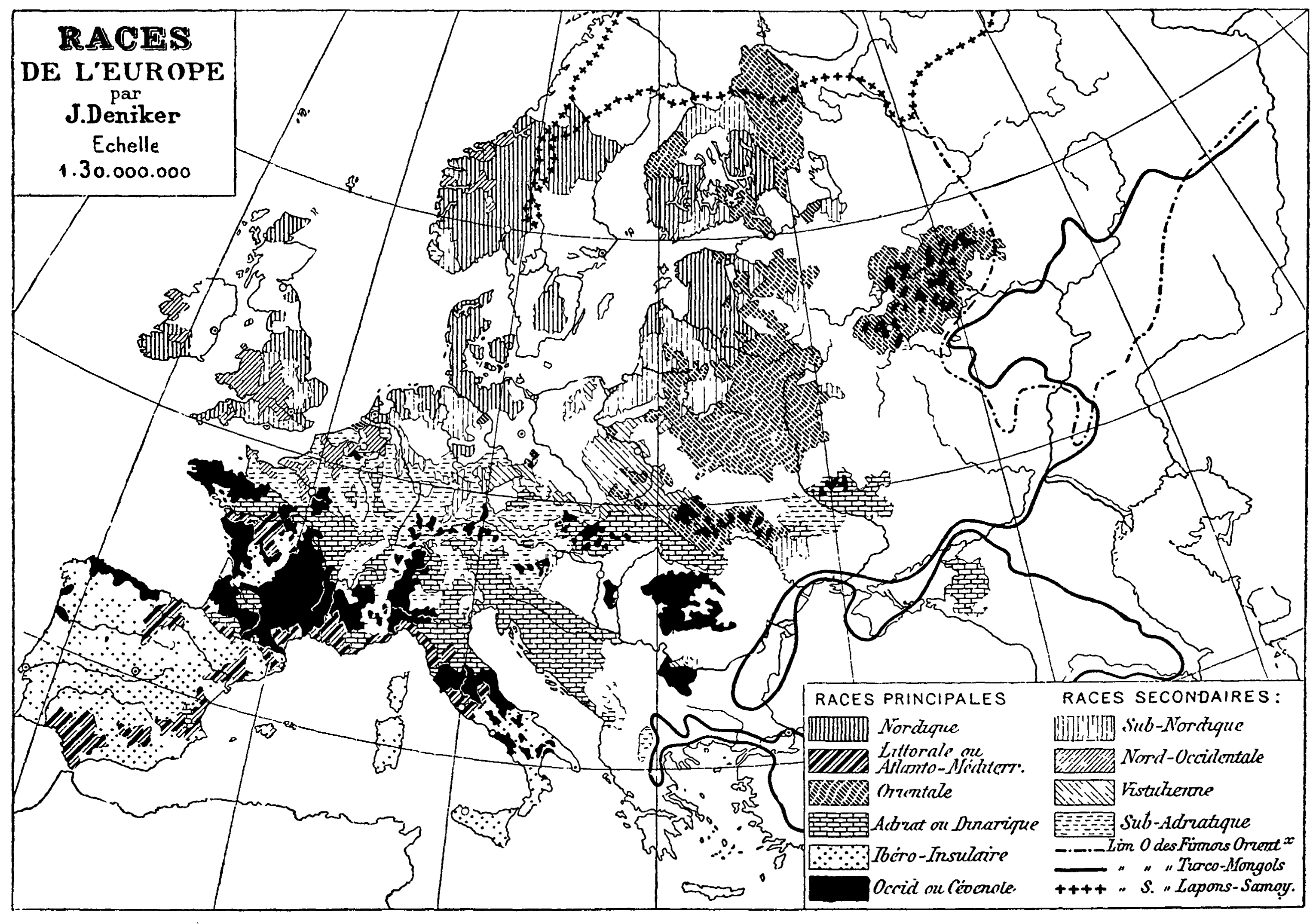
Deniker's "Races de l'Europe" from 1899, listing as "principal races": Nordic, Littoral, Oriental, Dinaric, Iberic, Occidental and as "secondary races": Subnordic, Nord-Occidental, Vistulian, Subadriatic. Towards the north and east, boundaries to the territory settled by non-European races are shown: the Sami (Lap) (north), Eastern Finns (east) and Turco-Mongols (east and south-east)

Deniker's complicated maps of European races, of which he sometimes counted upwards of twenty, were widely referenced in his day, if only to illustrate the extremes of arbitrary racial classification. Deniker had an extensive debate with another racial cartographer, William Z. Ripley, over the nature of race and the number of races. At the time, Ripley maintained that the peoples of Europe were composed of three main racial stocks, while Deniker held there were six primary European races (besides four secondary or subsidiary races). The six primary races are:

- Nordic, in the Germanic core territory in Scandinavia, Northern Germany and Frisia, the British Isles and the Baltic
- Littoral or Atlanto-Mediterranean, in the Pyrenees and parts of Spain, western and southern France and north-western Italy
- Oriental; also called Eastern, in the Slavic core territory (Belarus, Ukraine and eastern Poland)
- Adriatic or Dinaric, around the Adriatic Sea, with widespread remnants in parts of France, Austria, Ukraine and Ciscaucasia
- Ibero-Insular in the Iberian Peninsula, western France, southern Italy and the Mediterranean islands
- Occidental (also called Cevenole); corresponding to Ripley's Alpine race, was supposedly the race of the Paleolithic inhabitants of Europe, with scattered remnants throughout the continent

The four subtypes are:

- Sub-Nordic, on the fringes of Germanic settlement in southern Britain, Germany and the Baltic
- North-Occidental, in the contact zone of Celtic and Germanic, in the British Isles and northern France
- Vistulian, named for the Vistula, in the Germanic-Slavic contact zone in Poland
- Sub-Adriatic; in the Alps and the historical Continental Celtic core territory

According to Jan Czekanowski, both Deniker and Ripley omitted the existence of the Armenoid race, which Czekanowski claims to be one of the four main races of Europe, met especially among the Eastern Europeans and Southern Europeans. Deniker's most lasting contribution to the field of racial theory was the designation of one of his races as la race nordique. While this group had no special place in Deniker's racial model, this "Nordic race" would be elevated by the famous eugenicist and anthropologist Madison Grant in his Nordic theory to the engine of civilization. Grant adopted Ripley's three-race model for Europeans, but disliked Ripley's use of the "Teuton" for one of the races. Grant transliterated la race nordique into "Nordic", and promoted it to the top of his racial hierarchy in his own popular racial theory of the 1910s and 1920s.

Deniker proposed that the concept of race was too confusing, and instead proposed the use of the word "ethnic group" instead, which was later adopted prominently in the work of Julian Huxley and Alfred C. Haddon. Ripley argued that Deniker's idea of a race should be rather called a "type", since it was far less biologically rigid than most approaches to the question of race.

== Selected works ==
- Recherches anatomiques et embryologiques sur les singes anthropoides (1886)
- Etude sur les Kalmouks (1883)
- Les Ghiliaks (1883)
- Races et peuples de la terre (1900)
- The races of man: an outline of anthropology and ethnography (1900)

The author abbreviation Deniker is used to indicate this individual as the author when citing a botanical name.
