= Dinaric =

Dinaric may refer to:

- Dinara, a mountain on the border of Croatia with Bosnia and Herzegovina
- Dinaric Alps, a mountain chain
- Dinaric race, in physical anthropology
