= Carabus pseudomonticola =

Scientific classification
- Domain: Eukaryota
- Kingdom: Animalia
- Phylum: Arthropoda
- Class: Insecta
- Order: Coleoptera
- Suborder: Adephaga
- Family: Carabidae
- Genus: Carabus
- Species: C. pseudomonticola

Binomial name
- Carabus pseudomonticola Lapouge, 1908

Species of beetle

Carabus pseudomonticola is a species of black coloured ground beetle from Carabinae subfamily, that can be found in France and Spain.
