= The Races of Europe =

The Races of Europe may refer to:

- The Races of Europe (Ripley book), by William Z. Ripley, 1899
- The Races of Europe (Coon book), by Carleton S. Coon, 1939
