= Alpine race =

Obsolete racial classification of humans

The Alpine race is an obsolete racial classification of humans based on a now-disproven theory of biological race. It was defined by some late 19th-century and early 20th-century anthropologists as one of the sub-races of the Caucasian race. The origin of the Alpine race was variously identified. Ripley argued that it migrated from Central Asia during the Neolithic Revolution, splitting the Nordic and Mediterranean populations. It was also identified as descending from the Celts residing in Central Europe in Neolithic times. The Alpine race was described as having moderate stature, neotenous features, and specific cranial measurements, such as a high cephalic index.

== History ==
The term "Alpine" (H. Alpinus) was used to denote a sub-race of the Caucasian race, first defined by William Z. Ripley (1899), but originally proposed by Vacher de Lapouge. It is equivalent to Joseph Deniker's "Occidental" or "Cevenole" race, while Jan Czekanowski regarded it as a subrace consisting of a mixture of Nordic and Armenoid. In the early 20th century, the Alpine race was popularised by numerous anthropologists, such as Thomas Griffith Taylor and Madison Grant, as well as in Soviet era anthropology.

The German Nazi Party under the influence direction of Hans F. K. Günther, recognized the Germans as including five racial subtypes, described by Günther in his work Kleine Rassenkunde des deutschen Volkes (1929): Nordic, Alpine, Mediterranean, East Baltic, and Dinaric, viewing Nordics as being at the top of the racial hierarchy. He defined each racial subtype according to general physical appearance and their psychological qualities including their "racial soul"—referring to their emotional traits and religious beliefs, and provided detailed information on their hair, eye, and skin colours, facial structure, and body types. He provided photographs of Germans identified as Nordic in places like Baden, Stuttgart, Salzburg, and Swabia; and provided photographs of Germans he identified as Nordic and Mediterranean types, especially in Bavaria and the Black Forest region of Baden. He also noted that the Alpine races in France spread fast after the French Revolution and Napoleonic War. Hitler was so impressed by this work by Günther, that he made it the basis of his eugenics policy.

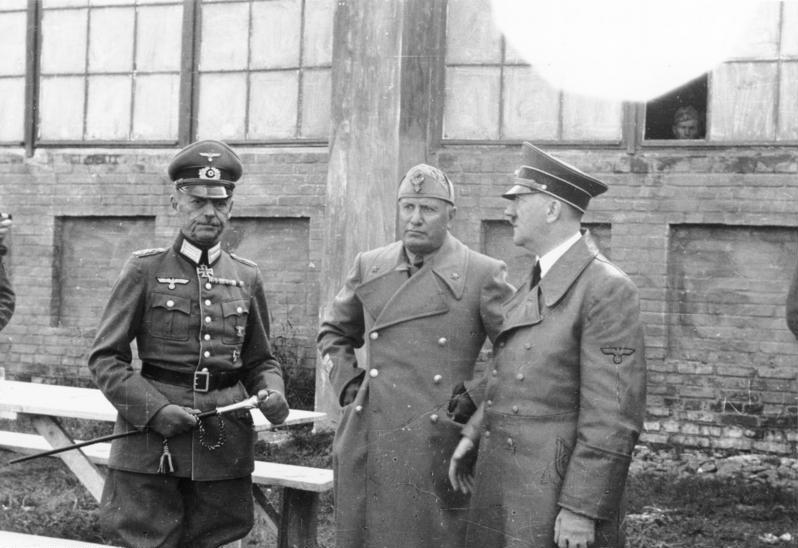
Rundstedt, Mussolini and Hitler, Russia 1941. Hitler identified Mussolini as part of the Alpine race.

Adolf Hitler utilized the term Alpine to refer to a type of the Aryan race, and in an interview spoke admiringly about his idol Italian Fascist leader Benito Mussolini, commending Mussolini's Alpine racial heritage saying:

They know that Benito Mussolini is constructing a colossal empire which will put the Roman Empire in the shade. We shall put up [...] for his victories. Mussolini is a typical representative of our Alpine race

— Adolf Hitler, 1931

=== Disproof by modern genetics ===
The fact that there are no sharp distinctions between the supposed racial groups had been observed by Blumenbach and later by Charles Darwin.

With the availability of new data due to the development of modern genetics, the concept of races in a biological sense has become untenable. Problems of the concept include: It "is not useful or necessary in research", scientists are not able to agree on the definition of a certain proposed race, and they do not even agree on the number of races, with some proponents of the concept suggesting 300 or even more "races". Also, data are not reconcilable with the concept of a treelike evolution nor with the concept of "biologically discrete, isolated, or static" populations.

=== Current scientific consensus ===
After discussing various criteria used in biology to define subspecies or races, Alan R. Templeton concludes in 2016: "[T]he answer to the question whether races exist in humans is clear and unambiguous: no."

== Physical appearance ==
A typical Alpine skull was regarded as brachycephalic ('broad-headed'). As well as being broad in the crania, this thickness was thought to appear generally elsewhere in the morphology of the Alpine, as Hans Günther (1927) describes:

The Alpine race is short-headed and broad-faced. The cephalic index is about 88 on the average, the facial index under 83. In the Alpine race the length of the head is only a little or barely greater than the breadth, owing to the relatively considerable measurement of this latter. The Alpine head may be called round. It juts out only slightly over the nape, and this back part is fairly roomy, so that in the Alpine man only a little of the neck is to be seen above the coat-collar. The cast of countenance gives the effect of dullness, owing to the steeply rising forehead, vaulted backwards, the rather low bridge to the nose, the short, rather flat nose, set clumsily over the upper lip, the unprominent, broad, rounded chin.

Ripley (1899) further notes that the nose of the Alpine is broader (mesorrhine) while their hair is usually a chestnut colour and their occiputs are slightly rounded. According to Robert Bennett Bean (1932) the skin pigmentation of the Alpine is an 'intermediate white', a colour in-between the lighter skinned Nordic and the darker-skinned Mediterranean. Despite the large numbers of alleged Alpines, the characteristics of the Alpines were not as widely discussed as those of the Nordics and Mediterraneans. Typically they were portrayed as "sedentary": solid peasant stock, the reliable backbone of the European population, but not outstanding for qualities of leadership or creativity. Madison Grant insisted on their "essentially peasant character".

According to Taylor (1931), Alpines have a strong work ethic and thrive best in their native homelands. Their diasporic communities are equally as capable but are not appreciated by their host countries. Instead, they are viewed as threats to the status quo.

== Geography and origin ==
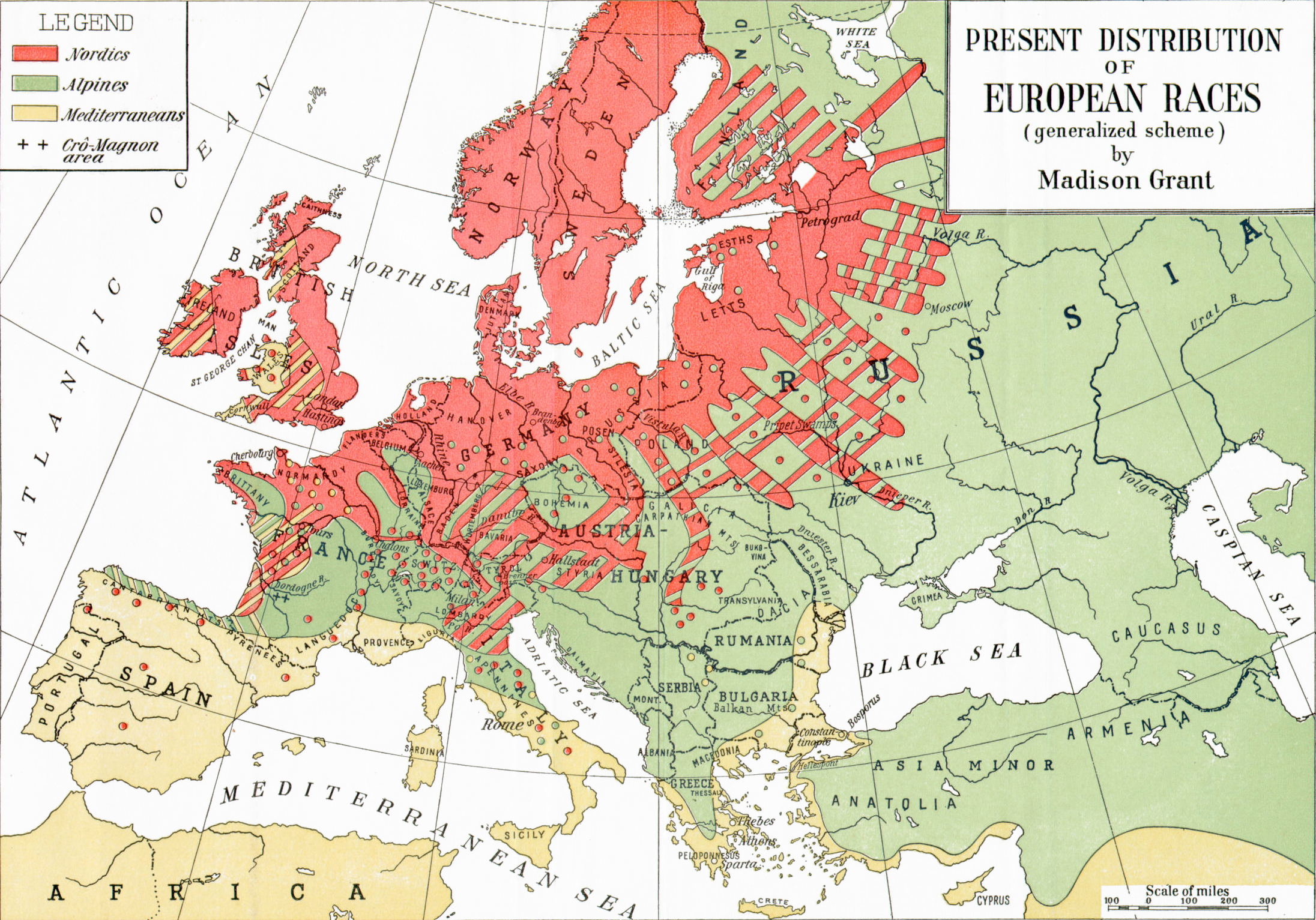
"Present Distribution of the European Races" map in Madison Grant's Passing of the Great Race, 1916. The area inhabited by the Alpine Race is in green.

According to Ripley and Coon, the Alpine race is predominant in Central Europe and parts of Western/Central Asia. Ripley argued that the Alpines had originated in Asia, and had spread westwards along with the emergence and expansion of agriculture, which they established in Europe. By migrating into Central Europe, they had separated the northern and southern branches of the earlier European stock, creating the conditions for the separate evolution of Nordics and Mediterraneans. This model was repeated in Madison Grant's book The Passing of the Great Race (1916), in which the Alpines were portrayed as the most populous of European and western Asian races.

In Carleton Coon's rewrite of Ripley's The Races of Europe, he developed a different argument that they are a reduced Upper Paleolithic survivors indigenous to Europe:

Alpine: A reduced and somewhat foetalized survivor of the Upper Palaeolithic population in Late Pleistocene France, highly brachycephalized; seems to represent in a large measure the bearer of the brachycephalic factor in Crô-Magnon. Close approximations to this type appear also in the Balkans and in the highlands of western and central Asia, suggesting that its ancestral prototype was widespread in Late Pleistocene times. In modern races it sometimes appears in a relatively pure form, sometimes as an element in mixed brachycephalic populations of multiple origin. It may have served in both Pleistocene and modern times as a bearer of the tendency toward brachycephalization into various population.

A debate concerning the origin of the Alpine race in Europe, involving Arthur Keith, John Myres and Alfred Cort Haddon was published by the Royal Geographical Society in 1906.

In 1931, Griffith Taylor argues that the broad-headed Alpine race colonized East Asia from Central Asia before migrating to Europe. He considers the Chinese to be "the eastern wing of the Alpine race", along with the Mongolians and "hybrid Japanese". Meanwhile, European Alpines can be found in Central and Eastern Europe, including Greece due to their racial affinities with the Slavs, and southern France.

The 1935 work of Frederick Orton states that the Alpine race was of Pashtun Afghan origin.

== See also ==
- Dinaric race
- East Baltic race
- Mediterranean race
- Nordic race
