= Nordic race =

Outdated grouping of human beings

The Nordic race is an obsolete racial classification of humans based on a now-disproven theory of biological race. It was once considered a race or one of the putative sub-races into which some late-19th to mid-20th century anthropologists divided the Caucasian race, claiming that its ancestral homelands were Northwestern and Northern Europe, particularly to populations such as Anglo-Saxons, Germanic peoples, Balts, Baltic Finns, Northern French, and certain Celts and Slavs. The supposed physical traits of the Nordics included light eyes, light skin, tall stature, and dolichocephalic skull; their psychological traits were deemed to be truthfulness, equitability, a competitive spirit, naivete, reservedness, and individualism. In the early 20th century, the belief that the Nordic race constituted the superior branch of the Caucasian race gave rise to the ideology of Nordicism.

With the rise of modern genetics, the concept of distinct human races in a biological sense has become obsolete. In 2019, the American Association of Biological Anthropologists stated: "The belief in 'races' as natural aspects of human biology, and the structures of inequality (racism) that emerge from such beliefs, are among the most damaging elements in the human experience both today and in the past."

== Background ==
The Russian-born French anthropologist Joseph Deniker initially proposed "nordique" (meaning 'northern') as an "ethnic group" (a term that he coined). He defined nordique by a set of physical characteristics: the concurrence of somewhat wavy hair, light eyes, reddish skin, tall stature and a dolichocephalic skull. Of six 'Caucasian' groups Deniker accommodated four into secondary ethnic groups, all of which he considered intermediate to the Nordic: Northwestern, Sub-Nordic, Vistula and Sub-Adriatic, respectively.

The notion of a distinct northern European race was also rejected by several anthropologists on craniometric grounds. German anthropologist Rudolf Virchow attacked the claim following a study of craniometry, which gave surprising results according to contemporary scientific racist theories on the "Aryan race". During the 1885 Anthropology Congress in Karlsruhe, Virchow denounced the "Nordic mysticism", while Josef Kollmann, a collaborator of Virchow, stated that the people of Europe, be they German, Italian, English or French, belonged to a "mixture of various races", furthermore declaring that the "results of craniology" led to "struggle against any theory concerning the superiority of this or that European race".

Other supposed "Caucasian sub-races" were the Alpine race, Dinaric race, Iranid race, East Baltic race, and the Mediterranean race.

== William Z. Ripley (1899) ==
American economist William Z. Ripley purported to define a "Teutonic race" in his book The Races of Europe (1899). He divided Europeans into three main subcategories: Teutonic, Alpine and Mediterranean. According to Ripley the Teutonic race resided in Scandinavia, northern France, northern Germany, the Baltic states and East Prussia, northern Poland, northwest Russia, Great Britain, Ireland, and parts of Central and Eastern Europe, and was typified by light hair, light skin, light eyes, tall stature, a narrow nose, and slender body type. It was Ripley who popularized this idea of three biological European races. Ripley borrowed Deniker's terminology of Nordic (he had previously used the term "Teuton"); his division of the European races relied on a variety of anthropometric measurements, but focused especially on their cephalic index and stature.

Compared to Deniker, Ripley advocated a simplified racial view and proposed the concept of a single Teutonic race linked to geographic areas where Nordic-like characteristics predominate, and contrasted these areas to the boundaries of two other types, Alpine and Mediterranean, thus reducing the "caucasoid branch of humanity" to three distinct groups.

== Early 20th century theories ==
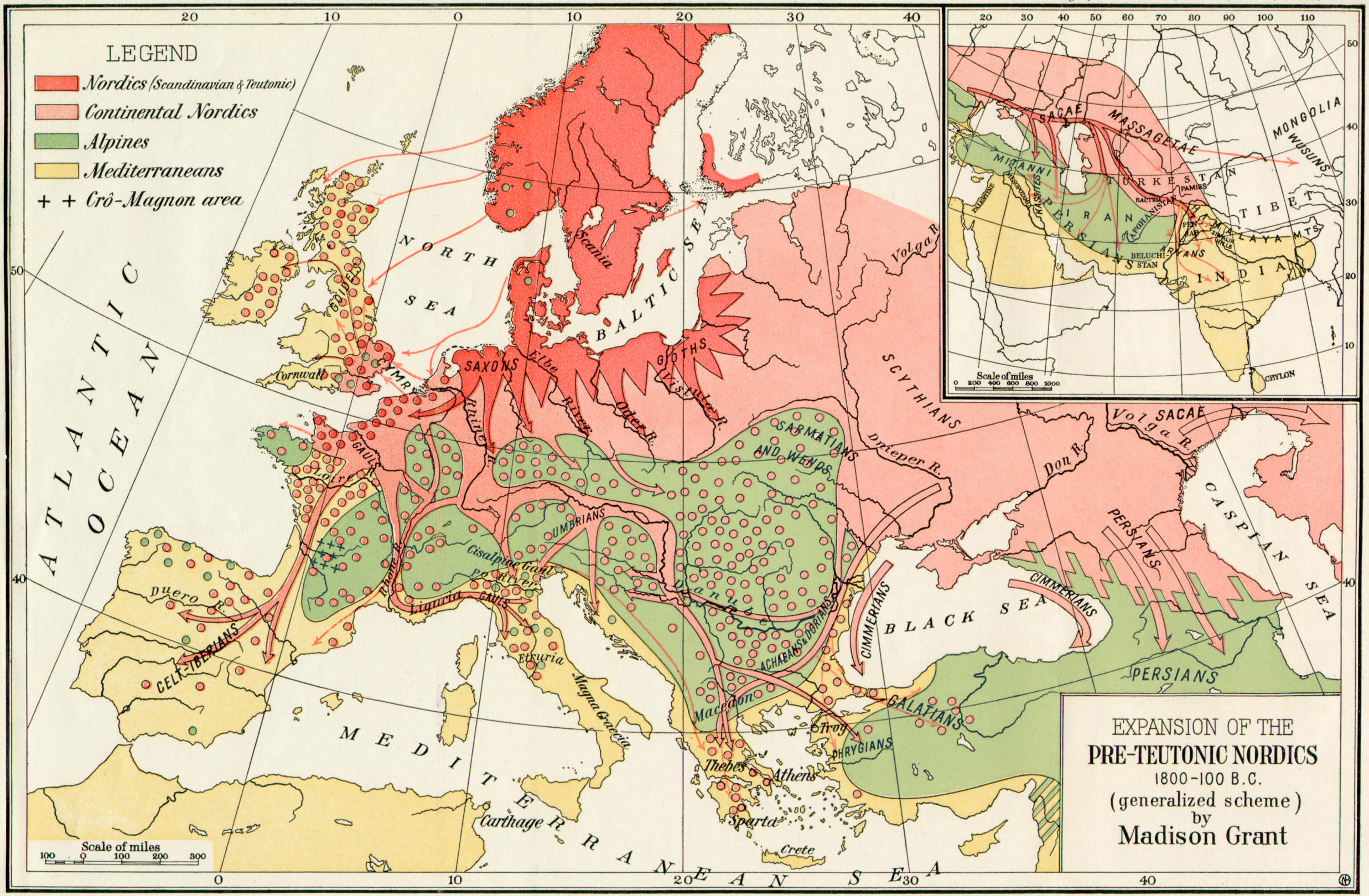
"Expansion of the Pre-Teutonic Nordics" — map from The Passing of the Great Race by Madison Grant showing early hypothesized migrations of Nordic peoples

By 1902 the German archaeologist Gustaf Kossinna identified the original Aryans (Proto-Indo-Europeans) with the north German Corded Ware culture, an argument that gained in currency over the following two decades. He placed the Indo-European Urheimat in Schleswig-Holstein, arguing that they had expanded across Europe from there. By the early 20th century this theory was well-established, though far from universally accepted. Sociologists were soon using the concept of a "blond race" to model the migrations of the supposedly more entrepreneurial and innovative components of European populations.

By the early 20th century, Ripley's tripartite Nordic/Alpine/Mediterranean model was well established. Most 19th century race-theorists like Arthur de Gobineau, Otto Ammon, Georges Vacher de Lapouge and Houston Stewart Chamberlain preferred to speak of "Aryans", "Teutons", and "Indo-Europeans" instead of a "Nordic race". The British-born German racialist Houston Stewart Chamberlain considered the Nordic race to be made up of Celtic and Germanic peoples, as well as some Slavs. Chamberlain called those people Celt-Germanic peoples, and his ideas would influence the ideology of Nordicism and Nazism.

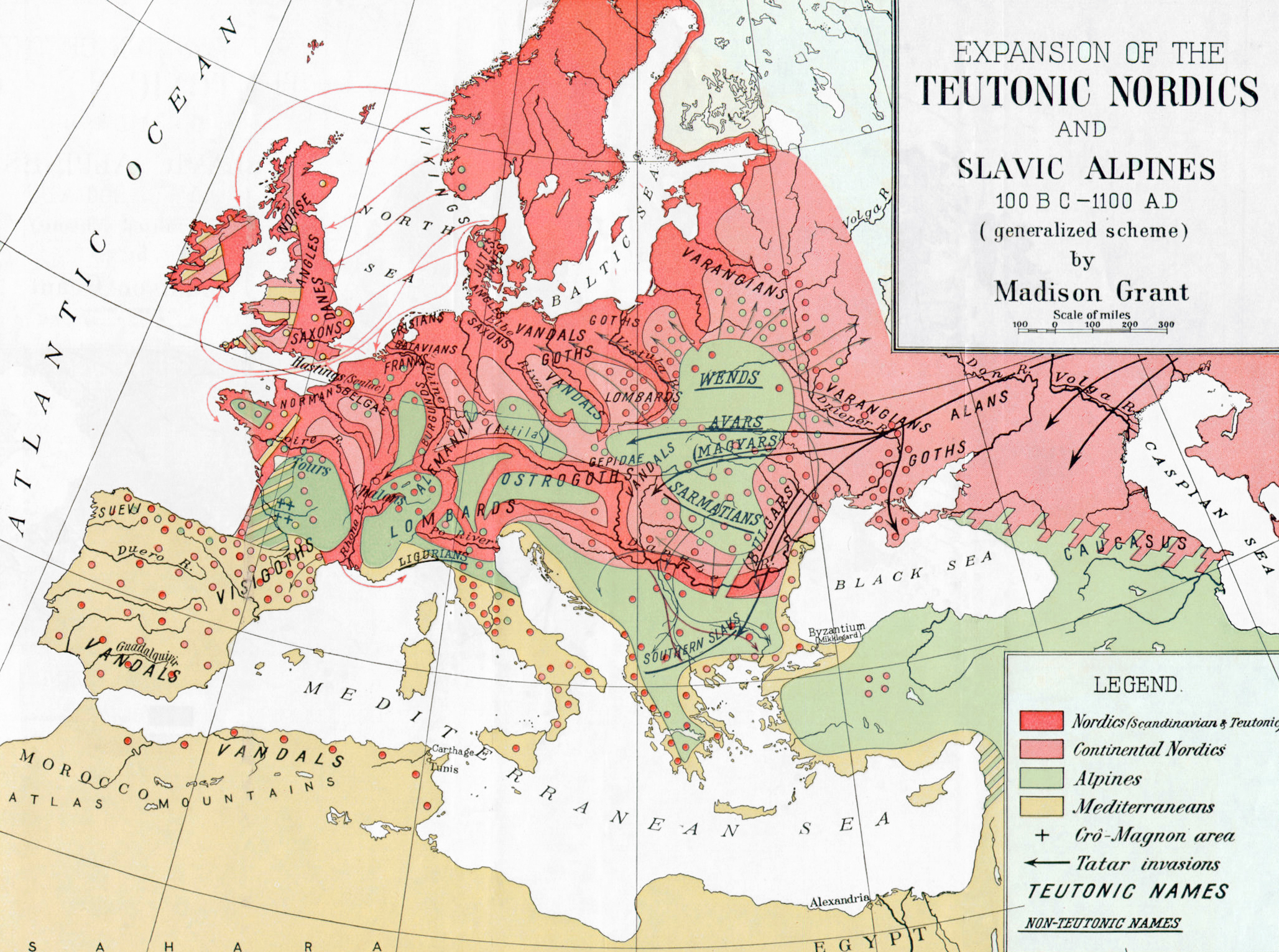
"Expansion of the Teutonic Nordics and Slavic Alpines" — map from Passing of the Great Race by Madison Grant showing the expansion of the Nordics and Alpines in Europe from the 1st century BC to the 11th century AD

Madison Grant, in his 1916 book The Passing of the Great Race, took up Ripley's classification. He described a "Nordic" or "Baltic" type:

"long skulled, very tall, fair skinned, with blond, brown or red hair and light coloured eyes. The Nordics inhabit the countries around the North and Baltic Seas and include not only the great Scandinavian and Teutonic groups, but also other early peoples who first appear in southern Europe and in Asia as representatives of Aryan language and culture."

According to Grant, the "Alpine race", shorter in stature, darker in colouring, with a rounder head, predominated in Central and Eastern Europe through to Turkey and the Eurasian steppes of Central Asia and Southern Russia. The "Mediterranean race", with dark hair and eyes, aquiline nose, swarthy complexion, moderate-to-short stature, and moderate or long skull was said to be prevalent in Southern Europe, the Middle East, and North Africa.

Only in the 1920s did a strong partiality for "Nordic" begin to reveal itself, and for a while the term was used almost interchangeably with Aryan. Later, however, Nordic would not be co-terminous with Aryan, Indo-European or Germanic. For example, the later Nazi minister for Food, Richard Walther Darré, who had developed a concept of the German peasantry as a Nordic race, used the term 'Aryan' to refer to the tribes of the Iranian plains.

In Rassenkunde des deutschen Volkes (Racial Science of the German People), published 1922, Hans F. K. Günther identified five principal European races instead of three, adding the East Baltic race (related to the Alpine race) and Dinaric race (related to the Nordic race) to Ripley's categories. This work was influential in Ewald Banse's publication of Die Rassenkarte von Europa in 1925 which combined research by Deniker, Ripley, Grant, Otto Hauser, Günther, Eugen Fischer and Gustav Kraitschek.

== Carleton S. Coon (1939) ==
Carleton S. Coon in his book of 1939 The Races of Europe subdivided the Nordic race into three main types, "Corded", "Danubian" and "Hallstatt", besides a "Neo-Danubian" type and a variety of Nordic types altered by Upper Palaeolithic or Alpine admixture. Types found in "places distant from the present northwestern European center of Nordic concentration" that he determined to be morphologically Nordic, were called "Exotic Nordics".

Coon took the Nordics to be a partially depigmented branch of the greater Mediterranean racial stock. This theory was also supported by Coon's mentor Earnest Albert Hooton, who in the same year published Twilight of Man, which stated: "The Nordic race is certainly a depigmented offshoot from the basic long-headed Mediterranean stock. It deserves separate racial classification only because its blond hair (ash or golden), its pure blue or grey eyes".

Coon suggested that the Nordic type emerged as a result of a mixture of "the Danubian Mediterranean strain with the later Corded element". Hence his two main Nordic types show Corded and Danubian predominance, respectively . A third "Hallstatt" type Coon took to have emerged in the European Iron Age, in Central Europe, where he said that it was subsequently mostly replaced, but "found a refuge in Sweden and in the eastern valleys of southern Norway."

Coon's theories on race were widely disputed in his lifetime, and are considered pseudoscientific in modern anthropology.

== Post-World War II theories ==
The depigmentation theory received notable support from later anthropologists, thus in 1947 Melville Jacobs noted: "To many physical anthropologists Nordic means a group with an especially high percentage of blondness, which represent a depigmentated Mediterranean". In her work Races of Man (1963, 2nd Ed. 1965) Sonia Mary Cole went further to argue that the Nordic race belongs to the "brunette Mediterranean" Caucasoid division but that it differs only in its higher percentage of blonde hair and light eyes. The Harvard anthropologist Claude Alvin Villee Jr. also was a notable proponent of this theory, writing: "The Nordic division, a partially depigmised branch of the Mediterranean group." Collier's Encyclopedia as late as 1984 contains an entry for this theory, citing anthropological support.

Some forensic scientists, pathologists and anthropologists up to the 1990s continued to use the tripartite division of Caucasoids: Nordic, Alpine and Mediterranean, based on their cranial anthropometry. The anthropologist Wilton M. Krogman for example identified Nordic racial crania in his work "The Human Skeleton in Forensic Medicine" (1986) as being "dolichochranic".

== In popular culture ==
A popular internet meme most often referred to as the "Yes Chad" or "Nordic Gamer", which depicts an idealized Nordic-looking man as a masculine and confident "chad", originated in alt-right memes on 4chan's /pol/ imageboard in 2016. The earliest forms of the meme, which echoed obsolete racial anthropology tropes, depicted the character in competition with a "Mediterranean" figure. The meme crossed over into mainstream culture by late 2020. It has been used in a wide variety of contexts, including the expression of leftist politics and support for diversity and inclusion, despite its roots. There has been discourse about whether the usage of the character serves as tacit normalization of racist symbols, similar to controversies about other internet memes like Pepe the Frog and wojaks.
