= Mediterranean race =

Outdated grouping of human beings

The Mediterranean race (also Mediterranid race) is an obsolete racial classification of humans based on the now-disproven theory of biological race. According to writers of the late 19th to mid-20th centuries it was a sub-race of the Caucasian race. In various definitions it was said to be prevalent in the Mediterranean Basin and areas near the Mediterranean and Black Sea, especially in Southern Europe, Eastern Europe, North Africa, most of West Asia, the Middle East or Near East; western Central Asia, parts of South Asia, and parts of the Horn of Africa. To a lesser extent, certain populations of people in Ireland and western parts of Great Britain, despite living far from the Mediterranean, were thought to have some minority Mediterranean elements in their population, such as Wales and Cornwall. Irish people with black hair and dark complexions were said to be the descendants of Spanish sailors shipwrecked during the Spanish Armada of 1588 and were often referred to as "Black Irish" particularly in the United States.

Carleton S. Coon characterized the subgroup as having shorter or medium (not tall) stature, a long (dolichocephalic) or moderate (mesocephalic) skull, a narrow and often slightly aquiline nose, the prevalence of dark hair and eyes, and frequently darker skin, ranging from cream to tan or dark brown skin tone; olive complexion being especially common and epitomizing the supposed Mediterranean race.

== Racial theories ==
=== Early debates ===
Racial differentiations occurred following long-standing claims about the alleged differences between the Nordic and the Mediterranean people. Such debates arose from responses to ancient writers who had commented on differences between northern and southern Europeans. The Greek and Roman people considered the Germanic and some Celtic peoples to be wild, red haired barbarians. Aristotle contended that the Greeks were an ideal people because they possessed a medium skin tone, in contrast to pale northerners. By the 19th century, long-standing cultural and religious differences between Protestant northwestern Europe and the Catholic south were being reinterpreted in racial terms.

=== 19th century ===
In the 19th century, the division of humanity into distinct races became a matter for scientific debate. In 1870, Thomas Huxley argued that there were four basic racial categories (Xanthochroic, Mongoloid, Australioid and Negroid). The Xanthochroic race were the "fair whites" of north and central Europe. According to Huxley,

On the south and west this type comes into contact and mixes with the "Melanochroi," or "dark whites" … In these regions are found, more or less mixed with Xanthochroi and Mongoloids, and extending to a greater or less distance into the conterminous Xanthochroic, Mongoloid, Negroid and Australioid areas, the men whom I have termed Melanochroi, or dark whites. Under its best form, this type is exhibited by many Irishmen, Welshmen and Bretons, by Spaniards, South Italians, Greeks, Armenians, Arabs and high-caste Brahmins … I am much disposed to think that the Melanochroi are the result of an intermixture between the Xanthochroi and the Australoids. It is to the Xanthochroi and Melanochroi, taken together, that the absurd denomination of "Caucasian" is usually applied.

By the late 19th century, Huxley's Xanthochroi group had been redefined as the "Nordic" race, whereas his Melanochroi became the Mediterranean race. As such, Huxley's Melanochroi eventually also comprised various other dark Caucasoid populations, including the Hamites (e.g. Berbers, Somalis, northern Sudanese, ancient Egyptians) and Moors.

William Z. Ripley's The Races of Europe (1899) created a tripartite model, which was later popularised by Madison Grant. It divided Europeans into three main subcategories: Teutonic, Alpine and Mediterranean. Ripley noted that although the European Caucasoid populations largely spoke Indo-European languages, the oldest extant language in Europe was Basque. He also acknowledged the existence of non-European Caucasoids, including various populations that did not speak Indo-European or Indo-Iranian languages, such as Hamito-Semitic and Turkish groups.

European racial types according to Ripley
	Head	Face	Hair	Eyes	Stature	Nose	Synonyms
Teutonic	Long	Long	Very light	Blue	Tall	Narrow, aquiline	Nordic (Deniker), Homo Europaeus (Lapouge)
Alpine (Celtic)	Round	Broad	Light chestnut	Hazel, gray	Medium; stocky	Variable; rather broad, heavy	Occidental (Deniker), Homo Alpinus (Lapouge)
Mediterranean	Long	Long	Dark brown or black	Dark	Medium; slender	Narrow, slightly aquilline	Ibero-Insular, Atlanto-Mediterranean (Deniker)

=== 20th century ===
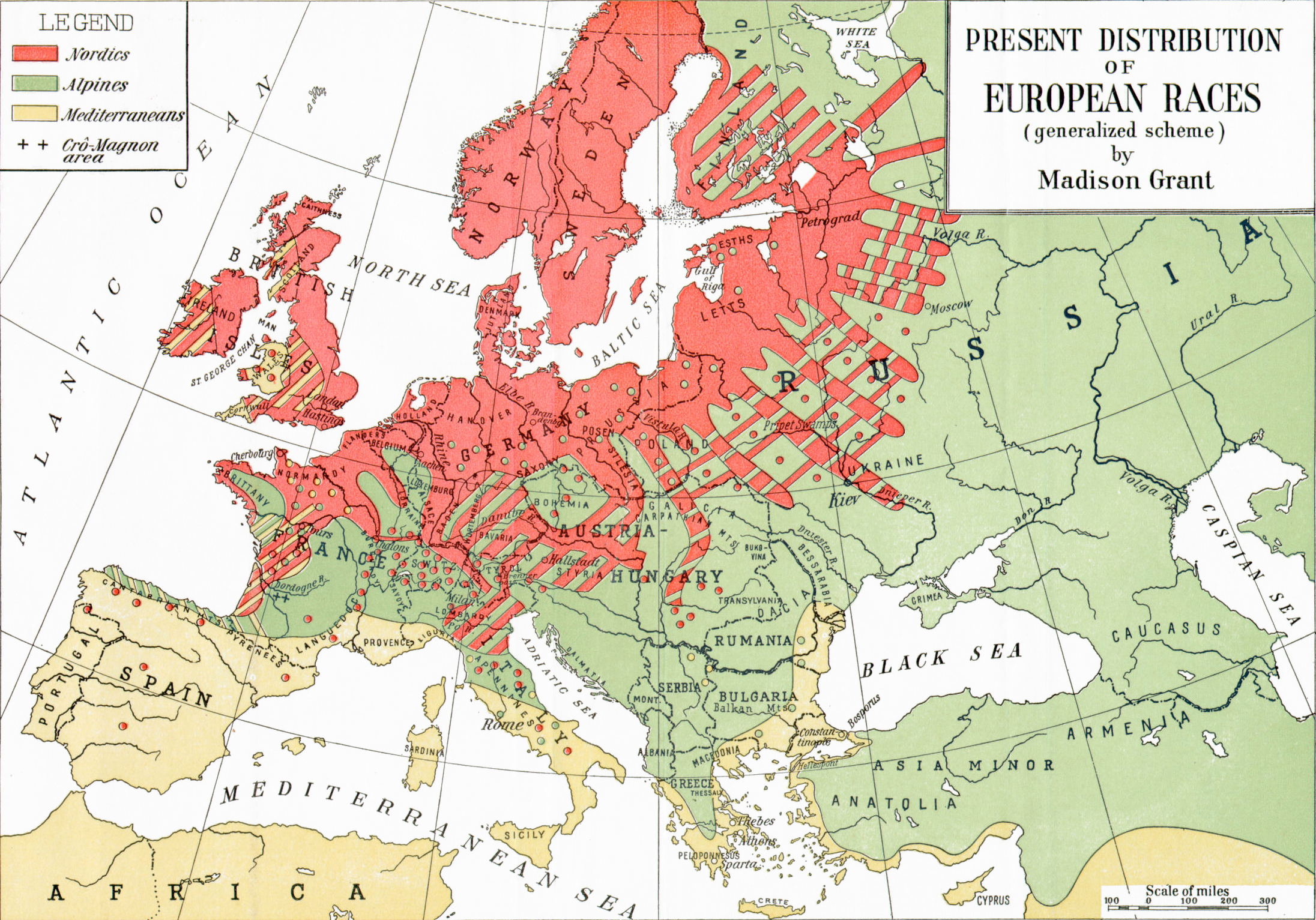
Distribution of European racial types, from Madison Grant's The Passing of the Great Race (1916). Mediterranean race is shown in yellow; green indicates the Alpine race; bright red is the Nordic race.

During the 20th century, white supremacists and Nordicists in Europe and the United States promoted the merits of the Nordic race as the most "advanced" of all the human population groups, designating them as the "master race". Southern/Eastern Europeans were deemed to be inferior, an argument that dated back to Arthur de Gobineau's claims that racial mixing was responsible for the decline of the Roman Empire. However, in southern Europe itself alternative models were developed which stressed the merits of Mediterranean peoples, drawing on established traditions dating from ancient and Renaissance claims about the superiority of civilisation in the south.

Giuseppe Sergi's much-debated book The Mediterranean Race (1901) argued that the Mediterranean race had likely originated from a common ancestral stock that evolved in the Sahara region or the Eastern part of Africa, in the region of the great lakes, near the sources of the Nile, including Somalia, and which later spread from there to populate North Africa, and the circum-Mediterranean region. Sergi added that the Mediterranean race "in its external characters is a brown human variety, neither white nor negroid, but pure in its elements, that is to say not a product of the mixture of Whites with Negroes or negroid peoples." He explained this taxonomy as inspired by an understanding of "the morphology of the skull as revealing those internal physical characters of human stocks which remain constant through long ages and at far remote spots[...] As a zoologist can recognise the character of an animal species or variety belonging to any region of the globe or any period of time, so also should an anthropologist if he follows the same method of investigating the morphological characters of the skull[...] This method has guided me in my investigations into the present problem and has given me unexpected results which were often afterwards confirmed by archaeology or history."

According to Sergi, the Mediterranean race was the "greatest race of the world" and was singularly responsible for the most accomplished civilizations of antiquity, including those of Ancient Egypt, Ancient Greece, Ancient Persia, Ancient Rome, Carthage, Hittite Anatolia, Land of Punt, Mesopotamia and Phoenicia. The four great branches of the Mediterranean stock were the Libyans, the Ligurians, the Pelasgians and the Iberians. Ancient Egyptians, Ethiopians and Somalis were considered by Sergi as Hamites, themselves constituting a Mediterranean variety and one situated close to the cradle of the stock. To Sergi, the Semites were a branch of the Eurafricans who were closely related to the Mediterraneans. He also asserted that the light-skinned Nordic race descended from the Eurafricans.

According to Robert Ranulph Marett, "it is in North Africa that we must probably place the original hotbed of that Mediterranean race".

Later in the 20th century, the concept of a distinctive Mediterranean race was still considered useful by theorists such as Earnest Hooton in Up From the Ape (1931) and Carleton S. Coon in his revised edition of Ripley's Races of Europe (1939). These writers subscribed to Sergi's depigmentation theory that the Nordic race was the northern variety of Mediterraneans that lost pigmentation through natural selection due to the environment.

According to Coon, the "homeland and cradle" of the Mediterranean race was in North Africa and Southwest Asia, in the area from Morocco to Afghanistan. He further stated that Mediterraneans formed the major population element in Pakistan and North India. Coon also argued that smaller Mediterraneans had travelled by land from the Mediterranean basin north into Europe in the Mesolithic era. Taller Mediterraneans (Atlanto-Mediterraneans) were Neolithic seafarers who sailed in reed-type boats and colonised the Mediterranean basin from a Near Eastern origin. He argued that they also colonised Britain & Ireland where their descendants may be seen today, characterized by dark brown hair, dark eyes and robust features. He stressed the central role of the Mediterraneans in his works, claiming "The Mediterraneans occupy the center of the stage; their areas of greatest concentration are precisely those where civilisation is the oldest. This is to be expected, since it was they who produced it and it, in a sense, that produced them".

C. G. Seligman also asserted that "it must, I think, be recognized that the Mediterranean race has actually more achievement to its credit than any other, since it is responsible for by far the greater part of Mediterranean civilization, certainly before 1000 B.C. (and probably much later), and so shaped not only the Aegean cultures, but those of Western as well as the greater part of Eastern Mediterranean lands, while the culture of their near relatives, the Hamitic pre-dynastic Egyptians, formed the basis of that of Egypt."

In the U.S., the idea that the Mediterranean race included certain populations on the African continent was taken up in the early 20th century by African-American writers such as W. E. B. Du Bois, who used it to attack white supremacist ideas about racial "purity". Such publications as the Journal of Negro History stressed the cross-fertilization of cultures between Africa and Europe, and adopted Sergi's view that the "civilizing" race had originated in Africa itself.

H. G. Wells referred to the Mediterranean race as the Iberian race.

While the close relationship between people living on both sides of the Mediterranean has been confirmed by modern genetics, the concept of distinct human races in a biological sense is rejected by modern scientific consensus. In 2019, the American Association of Physical Anthropologists stated: "The belief in 'races' as natural aspects of human biology, and the structures of inequality (racism) that emerge from such beliefs, are among the most damaging elements in the human experience both today and in the past."

== Physical traits ==
The first physical and social description of the Mediterranean race (then termed "Celtic race") was given by the Scottish author William Rhind in 1851:

The Celtic Race (anc. χελτοι, Galatæ, Pyreni), are characterised by a well-formed head, elongated from front to back, and moderate in breadth; face oval; features well defined and elegantly formed; complexion dark; dark brown or black eyes; black hair turning early grey; form middle size, handsome; feet and hands small. Mental powers quick, active and energetic, rather than profound. Passions and affections strong. Fond of society, but not forgetful of injuries. Monarchial in their governments. They occupy the southern and insular parts of Europe.

According to William Z. Ripley, the marked features of the Mediterranean race were dark hair, dark eyes, a long face, dolichocephalic skull, and a variable narrow nose.

C. S. Coon wrote that marked Mediterranean features included skin color ranging "from pink or peaches-and-cream to a light brown", a relatively prominent and aquiline nose, slight brow ridges, considerable body hair, and dark brown to black hair.

According to Renato Biasutti, frequent Mediterranean traits included "skin color 'matte'-white or brunet-white, chestnut or dark chestnut eyes and hair, not excessive pilosity; medium-low stature (162), body of moderately longilinear forms; dolichomorphic skull (78) with rounded occiput; oval face; leptorrhine nose (68) with straight spine, horizontal or inclined downwards base of the septum; large open eyes." Agreeing with Cipriani's classification, Biasutti also adopted a category of "Ibero-Insular" for a more archaic and isolated type observed in Sardinia, and especially among the South Eastern Sardinians, which went by the specific name of Paleo-Sardinian. According to Giuseppe Sergi, the earliest known inhabitants of Sardinia belonged, on the basis of the skeletons unearthed, to the Mediterranean race and were related to the North Africans; they were relatively dark-skinned, black-to-chestnut haired, and short in stature.

== Modern scientific consensus ==
The fact that there are no sharp distinctions between the supposed racial groups had been observed by Blumenbach and later by Charles Darwin.

With the availability of new data due to the development of modern genetics, the concept of races in a biological sense has become untenable. Problems of the concept include: it "is not useful or necessary in research", scientists are not able to agree on the definition of a certain proposed race, and they do not even agree on the number of races, with some proponents of the concept suggesting 300 or even more "races". Also, data are not reconcilable with the concept of a treelike evolution nor with the concept of "biologically discrete, isolated, or static" populations.

After discussing various criteria used in biology to define subspecies or races, Alan R. Templeton concludes in 2016: "[T]he answer to the question whether races exist in humans is clear and unambiguous: no."

== See also ==
- Anthropometry
- Mediterraneanism
- Arabid race
- Irano-Afghan race
- Indid race
- Armenoid race
