= Armenoid race =

Obsolete grouping of human beings

The Armenoid race was a supposed sub-race in the context of a now-outdated model of dividing humanity into different races which was developed originally by Europeans in support of colonialism. The Armenoid race was variously described (depending on author) as a "sub-race" of the "Aryan race" or the "Caucasian race" (e.g. by Carleton Coon).

== History of term ==
The term was used by Austrian anthropologist Felix von Luschan and Eugen Petersen in the 1889 book Reisen in Lykien, Milyas und Kibyratis ("Travel in Lycia, Milyas and Kibyratis"). Carleton Coon (1904–81) described the regions of West Asia such as Anatolia, the Caucasus, Iraq, Iran, and the Levant as the center of distribution of the Armenoid race. Anthropologist J.M Grintz considered the ancient Assyrians, the ancient Babylonians, as well as some ancient Egyptians (specifically of Sinai and Palestine) to have been Armenoid.

=== Nazi use of the term ===
In his works, Hans F. K. Günther portrayed the Jewish people as a specifically non-European racial mixture comprising Armenoid, Semitic, and Negroid elements. The German physical anthropologist Egon Freiherr von Eickstedt characterized the Jews as a racial mixture that is primarily of the Armenoid type. According to Croatian fascist Ustaše ideologists, only 5% of Croats, but 35% of Serbs were of the Armenoid race. They described the race as being "characterized by a dark complexion and a personality prone to trickery, fawning and cheating".

== Physiognomy ==
Carleton S. Coon wrote that the Armenoid racial type is similar to the Dinaric race, most probably due to racial mixture with the Mediterraneans (who often have olive skin) and the Alpines (who often have pale skin). The only difference is that Armenoids have a slightly darker pigmentation. He described the Armenoid as a sub-race of the Caucasoid race. Armenoids were said to be found throughout Eurasia – predominantly in the South Caucasus, Iran, and Mesopotamia. This racial type was believed to be prevalent among Armenians, Assyrians, as well as northern, central and southeastern Iraqis.

== See also ==
- Caucasian race
- Dinaric race
- Historical race concepts
- Race and society
- Race (human categorization)
- Degeneration Theory
- Polygenism
- Recent African origin of modern humans
- Superior: The Return of Race Science
