= Dinaric race =

Outdated grouping of human beings

The Dinaric race, also known as the Adriatic race, were pseudoscientific terms used by certain physical anthropologists in the early to mid-20th century to describe the perceived predominant phenotype of the contemporary ethnic groups of southeast Europe. According to the discredited theories of physical anthropologist Carleton Coon, the Dinaric race was most commonly found among the populations in the Balkans and Carpathians, such as Montenegrins, Serbs, Bosniaks, Croats, Ghegs, Slovaks, Romanians, Hungarians, Western Ukrainians, and Southern Poles. Additionally, in Northern Europe, the South Germans were also identified as having Dinaric characteristics.

== History ==
The notion of a Dinaric race originated with racial anthropologist Joseph Deniker in the late 19th century, but became most closely associated with the writings of Carleton S. Coon and Nazi eugenicist Hans F. K. Günther. The term was derived from the Dinaric Alps (the western part of Southeastern Europe) which was supposed to be the principal habitat of the race.

== Origin and distribution ==
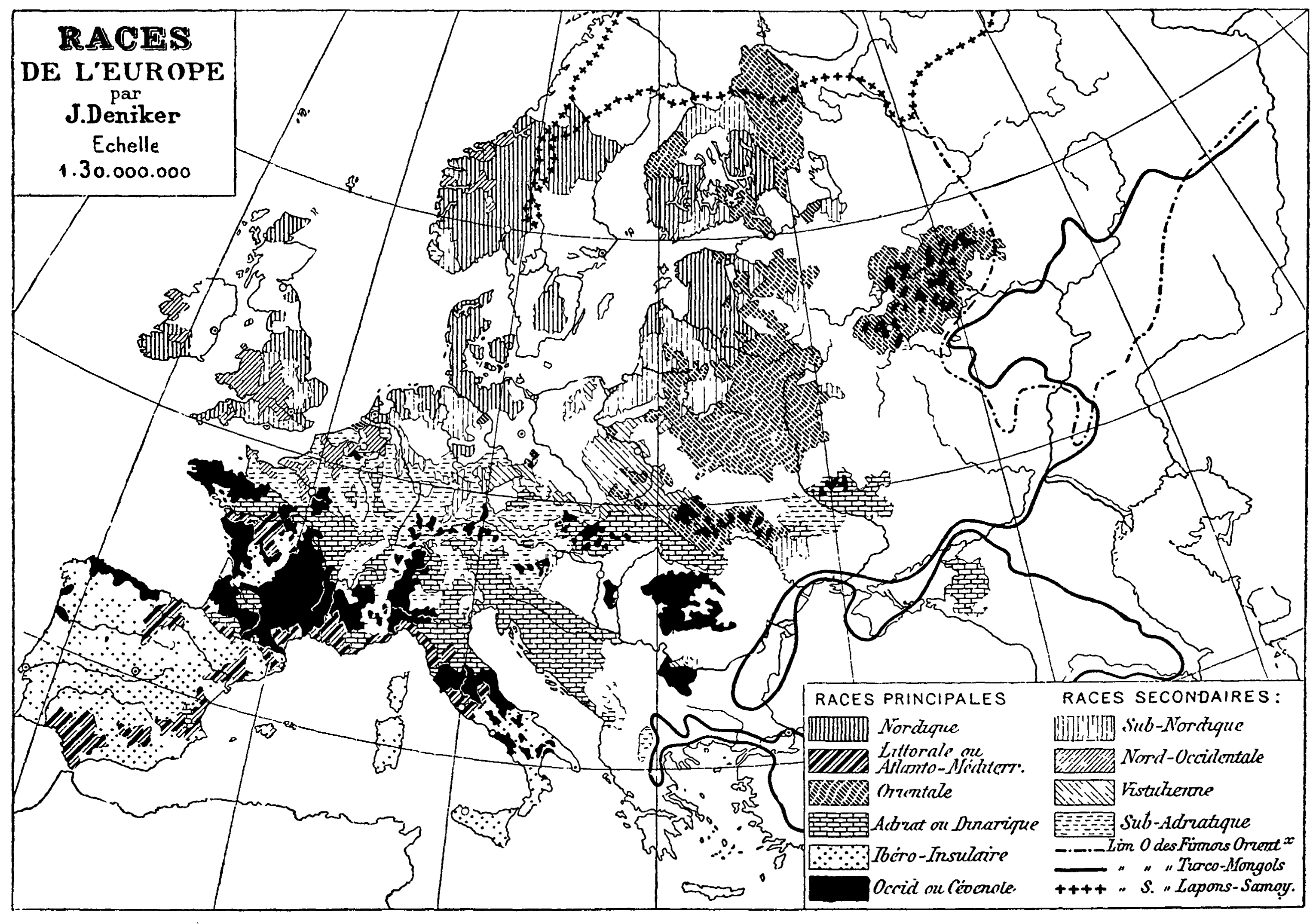
Joseph Deniker's map of European races (1899) identified "Dinarics" as the dominant group in parts of central Europe, Northern Italy and the northwestern Balkans.

Several pseudoscientific theories were advanced regarding the genesis of the Dinaric race. Günther argued that the Dinaric race shared a common origin with the Hither Asiatic (Near Eastern) race in the Caucasus region. They left the Caucasus region and underwent selective pressure, with the Dinaric race eventually possessing mental traits similar to the Nordic race. Jan Czekanowski believed that the Dinaric race arose from admixture between the Nordic and Armenoid race.

== "Noric" subtype ==
The Noric race (German: Norische Rasse) was a racial category proposed by the anthropologist Victor Lebzelter. The "Noric race" was supposed to be a sub-type of the Dinaric race more Nordic in appearance than standard Dinaric peoples. The term derived from Noricum, a province of the Roman Empire roughly equivalent to southern Austria and northern Slovenia.

== See also ==
- Scientific racism
- Phrenology
