= Madison Grant =

American eugenicist, conservationist, and author (1865–1937)

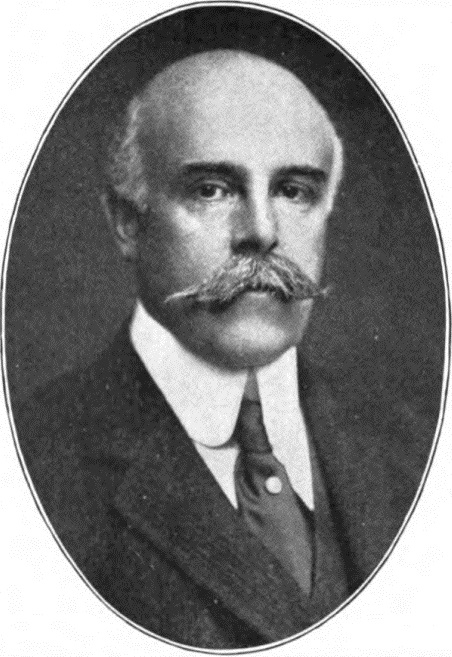
- Grant in the early 1920s
- Born: November 19, 1865; New York City, U.S.
- Died: May 30, 1937 (aged 71); New York City, U.S.
- Resting place: Sleepy Hollow Cemetery in Tarrytown, New York
- Education: Yale University (B.A., 1887); Columbia Law (LL.M., 1889)
- Occupations: Writer, zoologist, eugenicist
- Known for: Nordicism, Scientific racism The Passing of the Great Race

Madison Grant (November 19, 1865 – May 30, 1937) was an American lawyer, zoologist, anthropologist, and writer known for his work as a conservationist, eugenicist, and as an advocate of scientific racism. Grant is less noted for his far-reaching achievements in conservation than for his pseudoscientific advocacy of Nordicism, a form of racism which views the "Nordic race" as superior.

As a white supremacist eugenicist, Grant was the author of The Passing of the Great Race (1916), one of the most famous racist texts, a book Adolf Hitler referred to as his personal Bible. Grant also played an active role in crafting immigration restriction and anti-miscegenation laws in the United States.

As a conservationist, he is credited with the saving of species including the American bison, helped create the Bronx Zoo, Glacier National Park, and Denali National Park, and co-founded the Save the Redwoods League. Grant developed much of the discipline of wildlife management.

== Early life ==
Grant was born in New York City, the son of Gabriel Grant, a physician and American Civil War surgeon, and Caroline Manice. Madison Grant's mother was a descendant of Jessé de Forest, the Walloon Huguenot who in 1623 recruited the first band of colonists to settle in New Netherland, the Dutch Republic's territory on the American East Coast. On his father's side, Madison Grant's first American ancestor was Richard Treat, dean of Pitminster Church in England, who in 1630 was one of the first Puritan settlers of New England. Grant's forebears through Treat's line include Robert Treat (a colonial governor of New Jersey), Robert Treat Paine (a signer of the Declaration of Independence), Charles Grant (Madison Grant's grandfather, who served as an officer in the War of 1812), and Gabriel Grant (father of Madison), a prominent physician and the health commissioner of Newark, New Jersey. Grant was a lifelong resident of New York City.

Grant was the oldest of four siblings. The children's summers, and many of their weekends, were spent at Oatlands, the Long Island country estate built by their grandfather DeForest Manice in the 1830s. As a child, he attended private schools and traveled Europe and the Middle East with his father. He attended Yale University, graduating early and with honors in 1887. He received a law degree from Columbia Law School, and practiced law after graduation; however, his interests were primarily those of a naturalist. He never married and had no children. He first achieved a political reputation when he and his brother, DeForest Grant, took part in the 1894 electoral campaign of New York mayor William Lafayette Strong.

== Career and conservation efforts ==
Grant was a friend of several U.S. presidents, including Theodore Roosevelt and Herbert Hoover. He was a pioneer of conservationism in America in the late 19th and early 20th century, and is credited with saving many species from extinction. He co-founded the Save the Redwoods League with Frederick Russell Burnham, John C. Merriam, and Henry Fairfield Osborn in 1918. He is also credited with helping develop the first deer hunting laws in New York state, legislation which spread to other states as well over time.

Thomas C. Leonard wrote that "Grant was a cofounder of the American environmental movement, a crusading conservationist who preserved the California redwoods; saved the American bison from extinction; fought for stricter gun control laws; helped create Glacier and Denali national parks; and worked to preserve whales, bald eagles, and pronghorn antelopes."

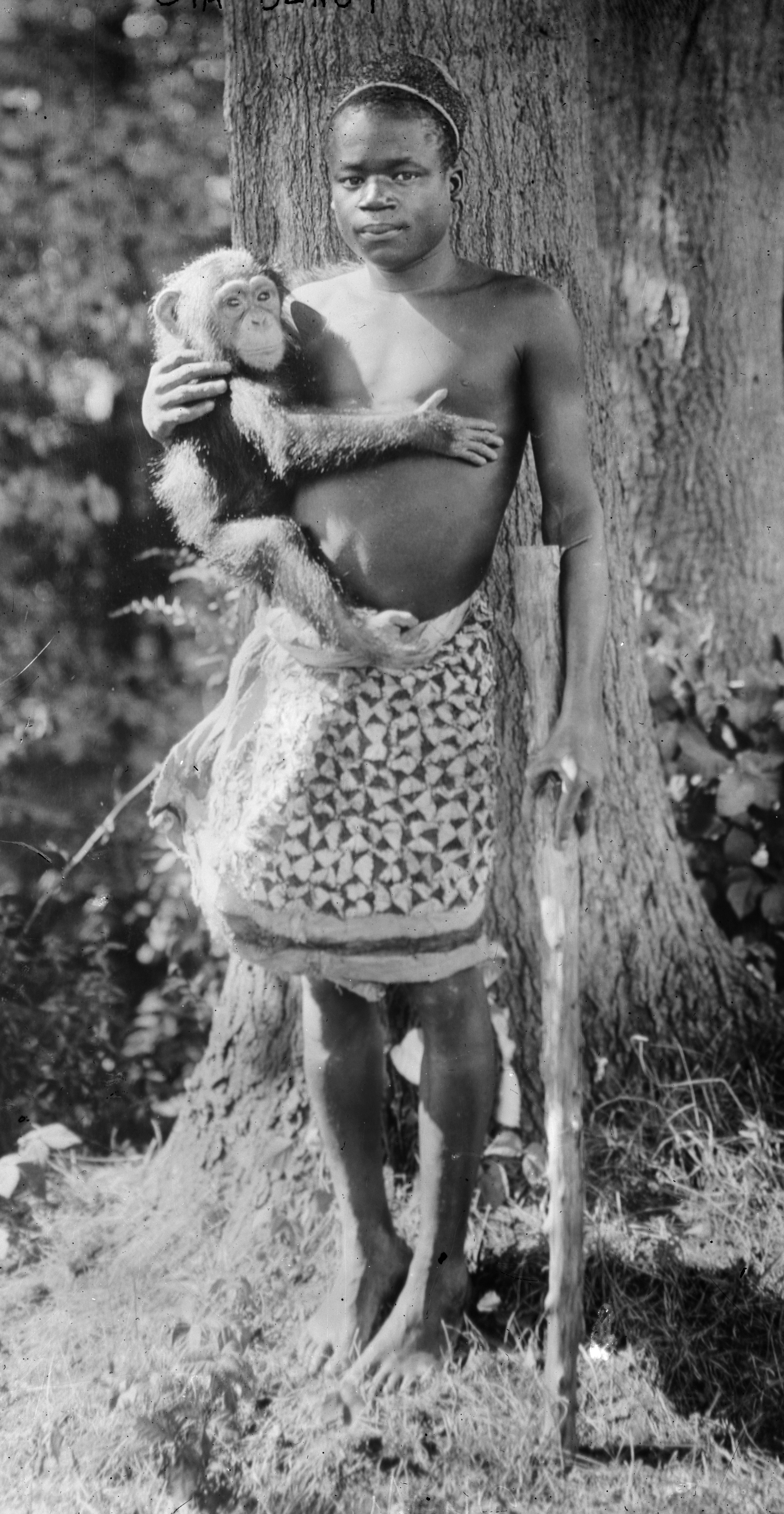
Ota Benga was exhibited in the Monkey House of the Bronx Zoo, New York, in 1906.

He was also a developer of wildlife management; he believed its development to be harmonized with the concept of eugenics. Grant helped to found the Bronx Zoo during his tenure as president of the New York Zoological Society, build the Bronx River Parkway, save the American bison as an organizer of the American Bison Society, and helped to create Glacier National Park and Denali National Park. In 1906, as secretary of the New York Zoological Society, he lobbied to put Ota Benga, a kidnapped Congolese man from the Mbuti people (a tribe of "pygmies"), on display alongside apes at the Bronx Zoo.

In addition to his conservationist work, Grant was an influential racist and eugenicist. Throughout the 1920s and 1930s, he served on the boards of many eugenic and philanthropic societies. He cofounded and served as the director of the American Eugenics Society, where he advocated the culling of the unfit from the human population. He also served on the board of trustees at the American Museum of Natural History, vice president of the Immigration Restriction League, a founding member of the Galton Society, and one of the eight members of the International Committee of Eugenics.

He was awarded the gold medal of the Society of Arts and Sciences in 1929. In 1931, the world's largest tree (in Dyerville, California) was dedicated to Grant, Merriam, and Osborn by the California State Board of Parks in recognition for their environmental efforts. A subspecies of caribou was named after Grant as well (Rangifer tarandus granti, also known as Grant's Caribou). He was an early member of the Boone and Crockett Club (a big game hunting and conservation organization) since 1893, and he mobilized its wealthy members to influence the government to conserve vast areas of land against encroaching industries. He was the head of the New York Zoological Society from 1925 until his death.

Grant's campaigns for conservationism and eugenics were not unrelated: both assumed the need for various types of stewardship over their charges. Grant was generally indifferent to forms of animal life that he did not regard as aristocratic, and assigned such a hierarchy to humans as well. Historian Jonathan Spiro wrote, "Whereas wildlife managers felt that the survival of the species as a whole was more important than the lives of a few individuals, so Grant preached that the fate of the race outweighed that of a few particular humans who were 'of no value to the community'." In Grant's mind, natural resources needed to be conserved for the "Nordic race" to the exclusion of other races. Grant viewed the Nordic race as he did any of his endangered species, and considered the modern industrial society as infringing just as much on its existence as it did on the redwoods. Like many eugenicists, Grant saw modern civilization as a violation of "survival of the fittest", whether it manifested itself in the over-logging of the forests, or the survival of the poor via welfare or charity. In the words of the New Yorker, for figures such as Grant, "it was an unsettlingly short step from managing forests to managing the human gene pool".

== Nordicism ==
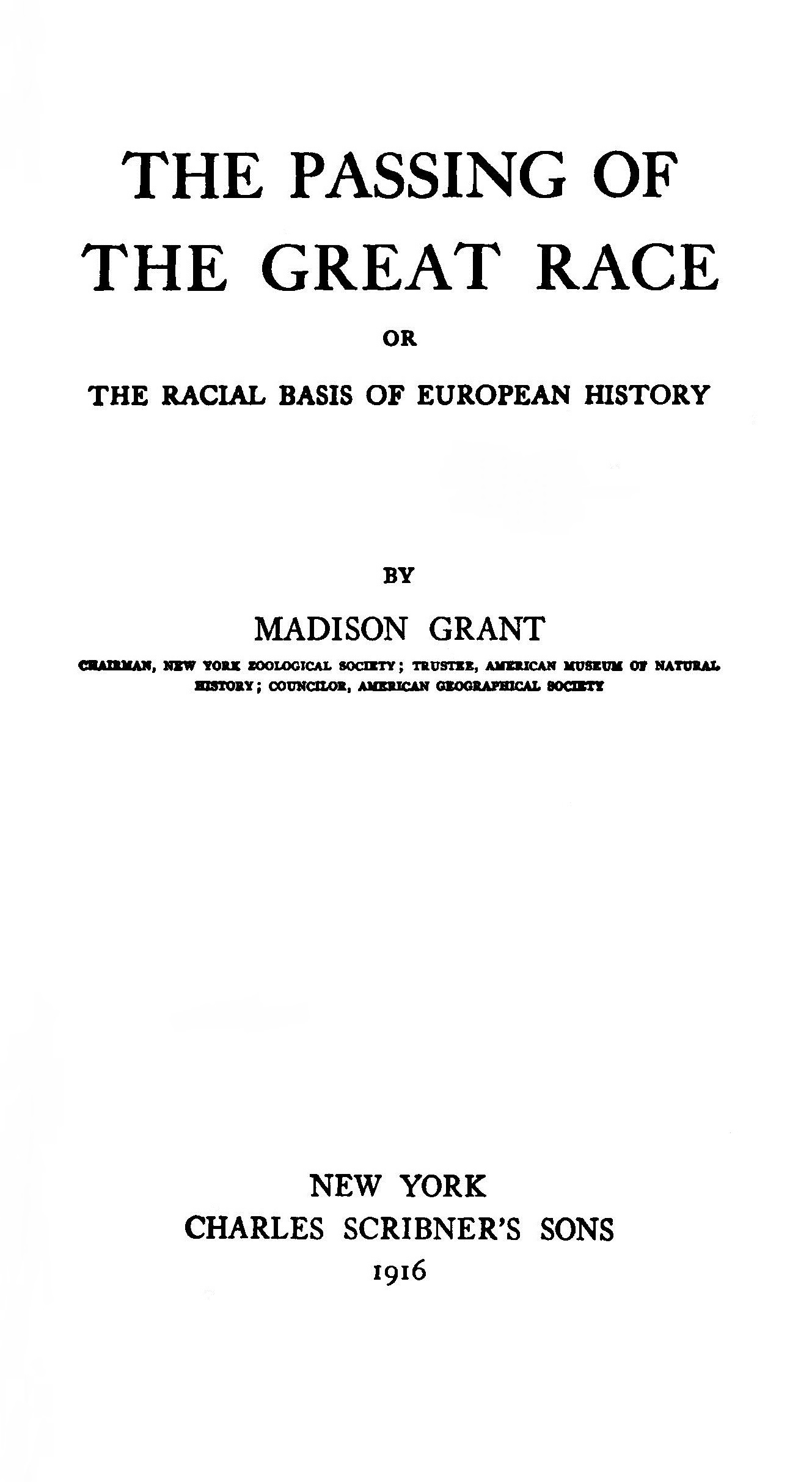
Title page of Grant's book The Passing of the Great Race (1916)

Grant was the author of the once much-read book The Passing of the Great Race (1916), an elaborate work of racial hygiene that claimed to give an account of the anthropological history of Europe. The most significant of Grant's concerns was with the changing "stock" of American immigration of the early 20th century (characterized by increased numbers of immigrants from Southern Europe and Eastern Europe, as opposed to Western Europe and Northern Europe), Passing of the Great Race was a "racial" interpretation of contemporary anthropology and history, stating race as the basic motor of civilization.

Similar ideas were proposed by prehistorian Gustaf Kossinna in Germany. Grant promoted the idea of the "Nordic race", a loosely defined biological-cultural grouping rooted in Scandinavia, as the key social group responsible for human development; thus the subtitle of the book was The racial basis of European history. As an avid eugenicist, Grant further advocated the separation, quarantine, and eventual collapse of "undesirable" traits and "worthless race types" from the human gene pool and the promotion, spread, and eventual restoration of desirable traits and "worthwhile race types" conducive to Nordic society.

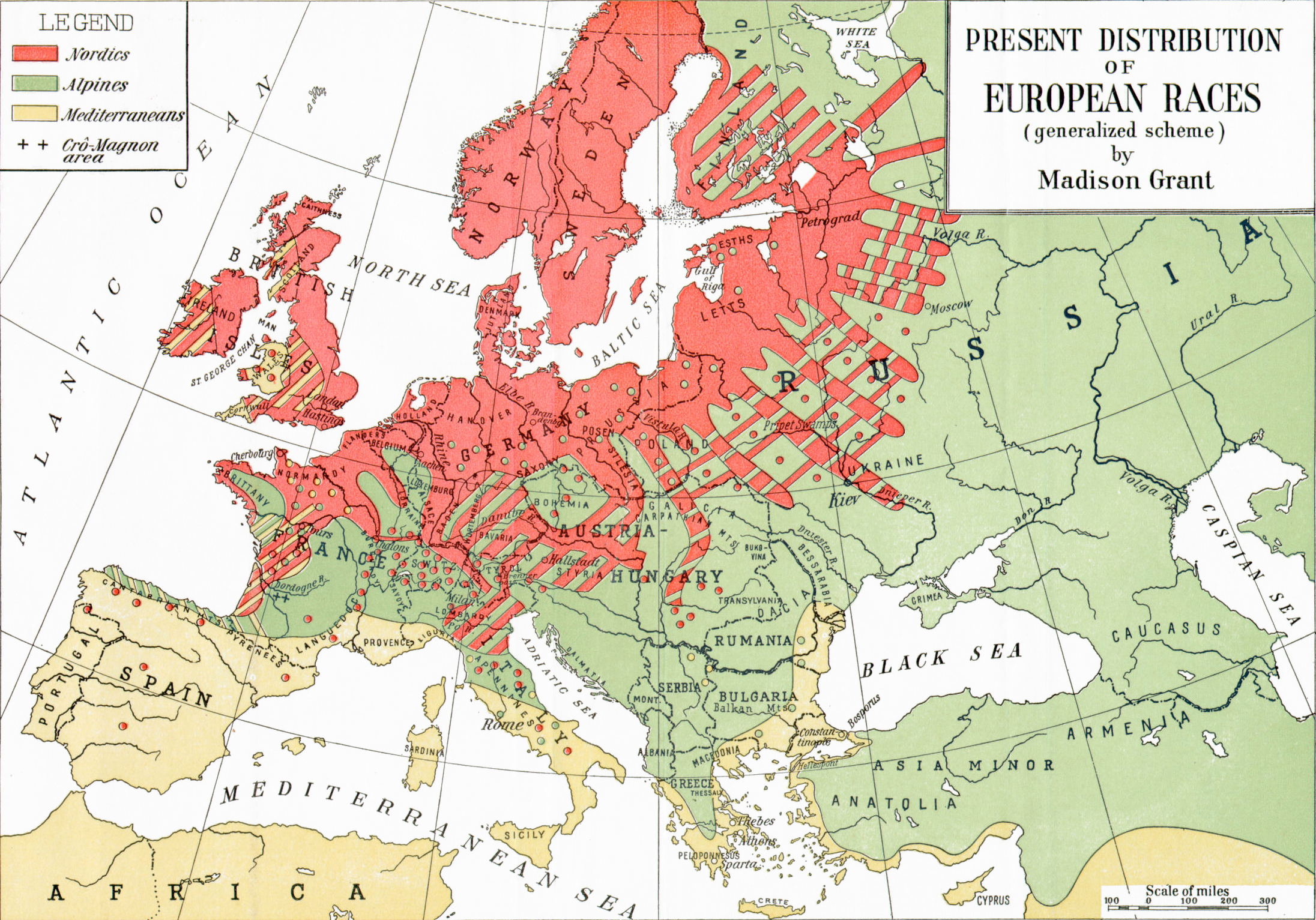
"Present Distribution of the European Races" (1916)—Grant's map of the "Nordics" in red, the "Alpines" in green, and the "Mediterraneans" in yellow

He wrote, "A rigid system of selection through the elimination of those who are weak or unfit—in other words social failures—would solve the whole question in one hundred years, as well as enable us to get rid of the undesirables who crowd our jails, hospitals, and insane asylums. The individual himself can be nourished, educated and protected by the community during his lifetime, but the state through sterilization must see to it that his line stops with him, or else future generations will be cursed with an ever increasing load of misguided sentimentalism. This is a practical, merciful, and inevitable solution of the whole problem, and can be applied to an ever widening circle of social discards, beginning always with the criminal, the diseased, and the insane, and extending gradually to types which may be called weaklings rather than defectives, and perhaps ultimately to worthless race types."

Grant's work is considered one of the most influential and vociferous works of scientific racism and eugenics to come out of the United States. Stephen Jay Gould described The Passing of the Great Race as "the most influential tract of American scientific racism". The Passing of the Great Race was published in multiple printings in the United States, and was translated into other languages, including German in 1925. By 1937, the book had sold 16,000 copies in the United States alone.

The book was embraced by proponents of the Nazi movement in Germany and was the first non-German book ordered to be reprinted by the Nazis when they took power. Adolf Hitler wrote personally to Grant, describing the book as "[his] bible" and Grant's "Nordic theory" became the bedrock of Nazi racial theories.

One of Grant's long-time opponents was the anthropologist Franz Boas. Grant disliked Boas and for several years tried to get him fired from his position at Columbia University. Boas and Grant were involved in a bitter struggle for control over the discipline of anthropology in the United States, while they both served (along with others) on the National Research Council Committee on Anthropology after the First World War.

Grant represented the "hereditarian" branch of physical anthropology at the time, despite his relatively amateur status, and was staunchly opposed to and by Boas himself (and the latter's students), who advocated cultural anthropology. Boas and his students eventually wrested control of the American Anthropological Association from Grant and his supporters, who had used it as a flagship organization for his brand of anthropology. In response, Grant, along with American eugenicist and biologist Charles B. Davenport, in 1918 founded the Galton Society as an alternative to Boas.

== Immigration restriction ==
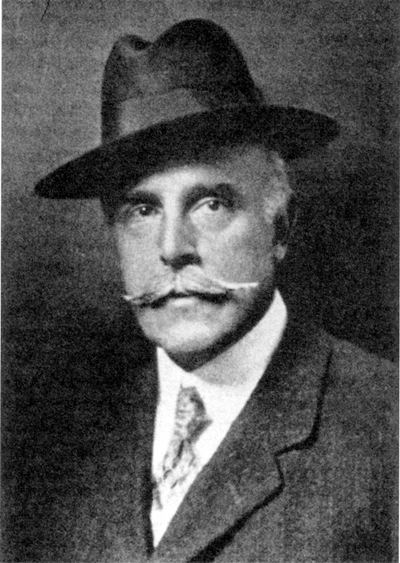
Grant in the 1920s

Grant advocated restricted immigration to the United States through limiting immigration from Eastern Europe and Southern Europe, as well as the complete end of immigration from East Asia. He also advocated efforts to purify the American population through selective breeding. He served as the vice president of the Immigration Restriction League from 1922 to his death. Grant campaigned for the passage of the Emergency Quota Act of 1921, and then acting as an expert on world racial data, Grant also provided statistics for the Immigration Act of 1924 to set the quotas on immigrants from certain European countries,

Even after passing the statute, Grant continued to be irked that even a smattering of non-Nordics were allowed to immigrate to the country each year. His support for anti-miscegenation laws was quoted in arguments for the Racial Integrity Act of 1924 in Virginia.

Though Grant was extremely influential in legislating his view of racial theory, he began to fall out of favor in the United States in the early 1930s. The declining interest in his work has been attributed both to the effects of the Great Depression, which resulted in a general backlash against Social Darwinism and related philosophies, and to the changing dynamics of racial issues in the United States during the interwar period. Rather than subdivide Europe into separate racial groups, the bi-racial (black vs. white) views of Grant's protegé Lothrop Stoddard became more dominant in the aftermath of the Great Migration of African-Americans from Southern States to Northern and Western ones.

== Legacy ==
According to historian of economics Thomas C. Leonard: "Prominent American eugenicists, including movement leaders Charles Davenport and Madison Grant, were conservatives. They identified fitness with social and economic position, and they also were hard hereditarians, dubious of the Lamarckian inheritance clung to by progressives. But as eugenicists, these conservatives were not classical liberals. Like all eugenicists, they were illiberal. Conservatives do not object to state coercion so long as it is used for what they regard as the right purposes, and these men were happy to trample on individual rights to obtain the greater good of improved hereditary health.... Historians invariably style Madison Grant a conservative, because he was a blueblood clubman from a patrician family, and his best- known work, The Passing of the Great Race, is a museum piece of scientific racism. But Grant's eugenic ideas originated from a corner of the conservative impulse intimately connected to Progressivism: conservation."

Leonard wrote that Grant also opposed war, had doubts about imperialism, and supported birth control.

Leonard's view that eugenicists such as Grant were conservatives is an outlier, however. Writer Jonah Goldberg has noted that "eugenics lay at the heart of the progressive enterprise" and was embraced by almost all early progressives, from Margaret Sanger to H. G. Wells and John Maynard Keynes. Likewise, Thomas Sowell has noted that most leading eugenicists were firmly ensconced within progressive intellectual circles, where the desire for the government to take strong action to protect the gene pool went hand-in-hand with other statist views, including opposition to free-market capitalism. Similarly, historian Edwin Black has stated that the eugenic crusade was "created in the publications and academic research rooms of the Carnegie Institution, verified by the research grants of the Rockefeller Foundation, validated by leading scholars from the best Ivy League universities, and financed by the special efforts of the Harriman railroad fortune."

Grant became a part of popular culture in 1920s America, especially in New York. Grant's conservationism and fascination with zoological natural history made him influential among the New York elite, who agreed with his cause, most notably Theodore Roosevelt. Author F. Scott Fitzgerald featured a reference to Grant in The Great Gatsby. Tom Buchanan, a fatuous Long Island aristocrat married to Daisy, was reading a book called The Rise of the Colored Empires by "this man Goddard", blending Grant's Passing of the Great Race and his colleague Lothrop Stoddard's The Rising Tide of Color Against White World Supremacy.

Grant left no offspring when he died in 1937 of nephritis. Several hundred people attended Grant's funeral, and he was buried in Sleepy Hollow Cemetery in Tarrytown, New York. He left a bequest of $25,000 to the New York Zoological Society to create "The Grant Endowment Fund for the Protection of Wild Life", $5,000 to the American Museum of Natural History, and another $5,000 to the Boone and Crockett Club. Relatives destroyed his personal papers and correspondence after his death.

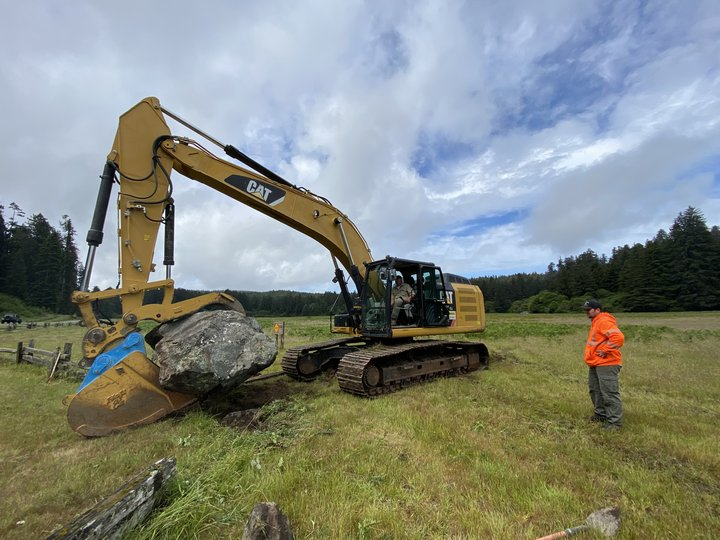
California State Parks removed Grant's Marker at Prairie Creek Redwoods State Park in June 2021.

At the postwar Nuremberg Trials, three pages of excerpts from Grant's Passing of the Great Race were introduced into evidence by the defense of Karl Brandt, Hitler's personal physician and head of the Nazi euthanasia program, in order to justify the population policies of the Third Reich, or at least indicate that they were not ideologically unique to Nazi Germany.

Grant's works of scientific racism have been cited to demonstrate that many of the genocidal and eugenic ideas associated with the Third Reich did not arise specifically in Germany, and in fact that many of them had origins in other countries, including the United States. As such, because of Grant's well-connected and influential friends, he is often used to illustrate the strain of race-based eugenic thinking in the United States, which had some influence until the Second World War. Because of the use made of Grant's eugenics work by the policy-makers of Nazi Germany, his work as a conservationist has been somewhat ignored and obscured, as many organizations with which he was once associated (such as the Sierra Club) wanted to minimize their association with him. His racial theories, which were popularized in the 1920s, are today seen as discredited. The work of Franz Boas and his students, Ruth Benedict and Margaret Mead, demonstrated that there were no inferior or superior races.

On June 15, 2021, California State Parks removed a memorial to Madison Grant from Prairie Creek Redwoods State Park placed in the park in 1948. The monument's removal is part of a broader effort in California Parks to address outdated exhibits and interpretations related to the founders of Save the Redwoods. In spring 2022, California State Parks will install a new interpretive panel, co-written with academic scholars, that tells a fuller story about Grant, his conservation legacy, and his central role in the eugenics movement.

In the 21st century, Grant's ideas have been cited by far-right figures such as Richard Spencer and the Norwegian mass shooter Anders Breivik. Grant has also been a fundamental forerunner to later ecofascism, being described as the "founding father" of ecofascism.

== Works ==
- The Caribou. New York: Office of the New York Zoological Society, 1902.
- "Moose". New York: Report of the Forest, Fish, Game Commission, 1903.
- The Origin and Relationship of the Large Mammals of North America. New York: Office of the New York Zoological Society, 1904.
- The Rocky Mountain Goat. Office of the New York Zoological Society, 1905.
- The Passing of the Great Race; or, The Racial Basis of European History. New York: Charles Scribner's Sons, 1916.
  - New ed., rev. and Amplified, with a New Preface by Henry Fairfield Osborn. New York: Charles Scribner's Sons, 1918
  - Rev. ed., with a Documentary Supplement, and a Preface by Henry Fairfield Osborn. New York: Charles Scribner's Sons, 1921.
  - Fourth rev. ed., with a Documentary Supplement, and a Preface by Henry Fairfield Osborn. New York: Charles Scribner's Sons, 1936.
- Saving the Redwoods; an Account of the Movement During 1919 to Preserve the Redwoods of California. New York: Zoological Society, 1919.
- Early History of Glacier National Park, Montana. Washington: Govt. print. off., 1919.
- The Conquest of a Continent; or, The Expansion of Races in America, Charles Scribner's Sons, 1933.

=== Selected articles ===
- "The Depletion of American Forests", Century Magazine, Vol. XLVIII, No. 1, May 1894.
- "The Vanishing Moose, and their Extermination in the Adirondacks", Century Magazine, Vol. XLVII, 1894.
- "A Canadian Moose Hunt". In: Theodore Roosevelt (ed.), Hunting in Many Lands. New York: Forest and Stream Publishing Company, 1895.
- "The Future of Our Fauna", Zoological Society Bulletin, No. 34, June 1909.
- "History of the Zoological Society", Zoological Society Bulletin, Decennial Number, No. 37, January 1910.
- "Condition of Wild Life in Alaska". In: Hunting at High Altitudes. New York: Harper & Brothers, Publishers, 1913.
- "Wild Life Protection", Zoological Society Bulletin, Vol. XIX, No. 1, January 1916.
- "The Passing of the Great Race", Geographical Review, Vol. 2, No. 5, Nov., 1916.
- "The Physical Basis of Race", Journal of the National Institute of Social Sciences, Vol. III, January 1917.
- "Discussion of Article on Democracy and Heredity", The Journal of Heredity, Vol. X, No. 4, April, 1919.
- "Restriction of Immigration: Racial Aspects", Journal of the National Institute of Social Sciences, Vol. VII, August 1921.
- "Racial Transformation of America", The North American Review, March 1924.
- "America for the Americans", The Forum, September 1925.

== See also ==
- Eugenics in the United States
- Institutional racism
- Henry Fairfield Osborn
- Racism
