= Aryanism =

Ideology of Aryan supremacy

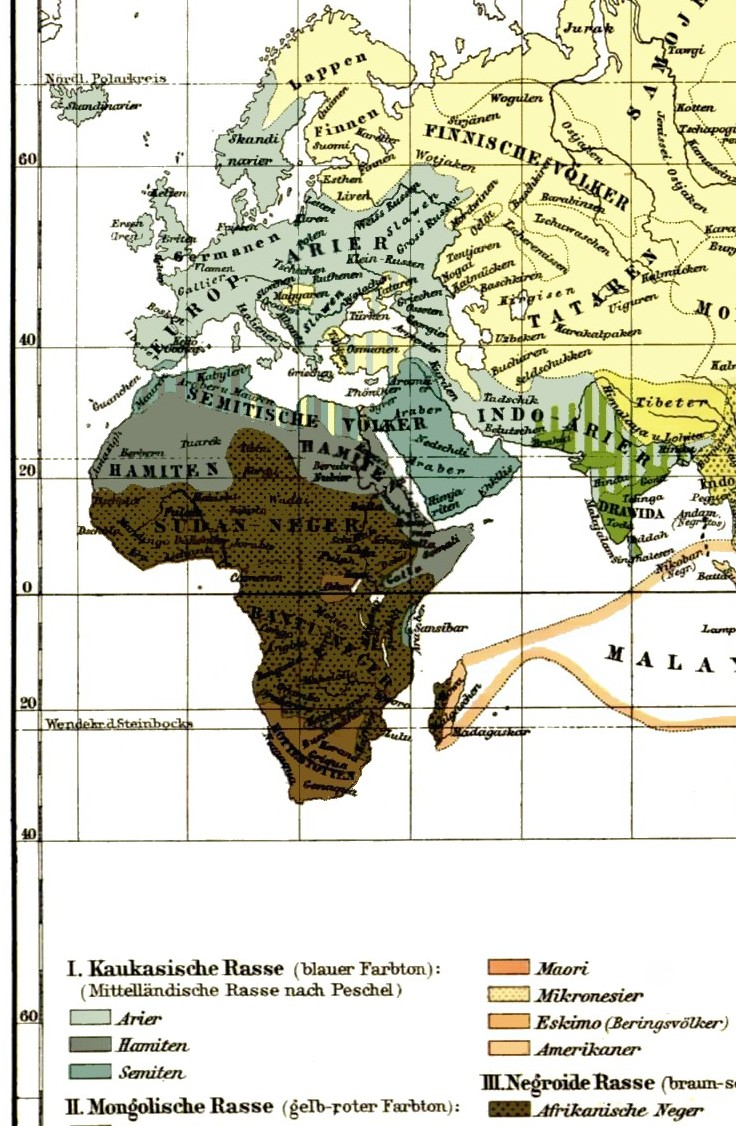
A nineteenth-century edition of the Meyers Konversations-Lexikon shows the Caucasian race (in shades of grayish blue) as comprising Aryans, Semites, and Hamites. Aryans are subdivided into European Aryans and Indo-Aryans (for those now called Indo-Iranians) and shown on the map in grayish light-blue color (described as Arier in the legend). The map shows most Europeans, Caucasians, and Iranian peoples as comprising Aryans, while Indo-Aryans are shown as being a mixture between Aryans and Dravidians.

Aryanism is an ideology of racial supremacy which views the supposed Aryan race as a distinct and superior racial group which is entitled to rule the rest of humanity. Initially promoted by racial theorists such as Arthur de Gobineau and Houston Stewart Chamberlain, Aryanism reached its peak of influence in Nazi Germany. In the 1930s and 40s, the regime applied the ideology with full force, sparking World War II with the 1939 invasion of Poland in pursuit of Lebensraum, or living space, for the Aryan people. The racial policies which were implemented by the Nazis during the 1930s came to a head during their conquest of Europe and the Soviet Union, culminating in the industrial mass murder of six million Jews and eleven million other victims in what is now known as the Holocaust.

== Background ==
By the late 19th century, a number of later writers—such as the French anthropologist Vacher de Lapouge in his book L'Aryen—argued that this superior branch of Aryans could be identified biologically by using the cephalic index (a measure of head shape) and other indicators. He argued that the long-headed "dolichocephalic-blond" Europeans, characteristically found in Northern Europe, were natural leaders, destined to rule over more "brachycephalic" (short-headed) peoples. Similar theories were promoted by Nordicists like Arthur de Gobineau and Houston Stewart Chamberlain.

== Nazism and Aryanism ==
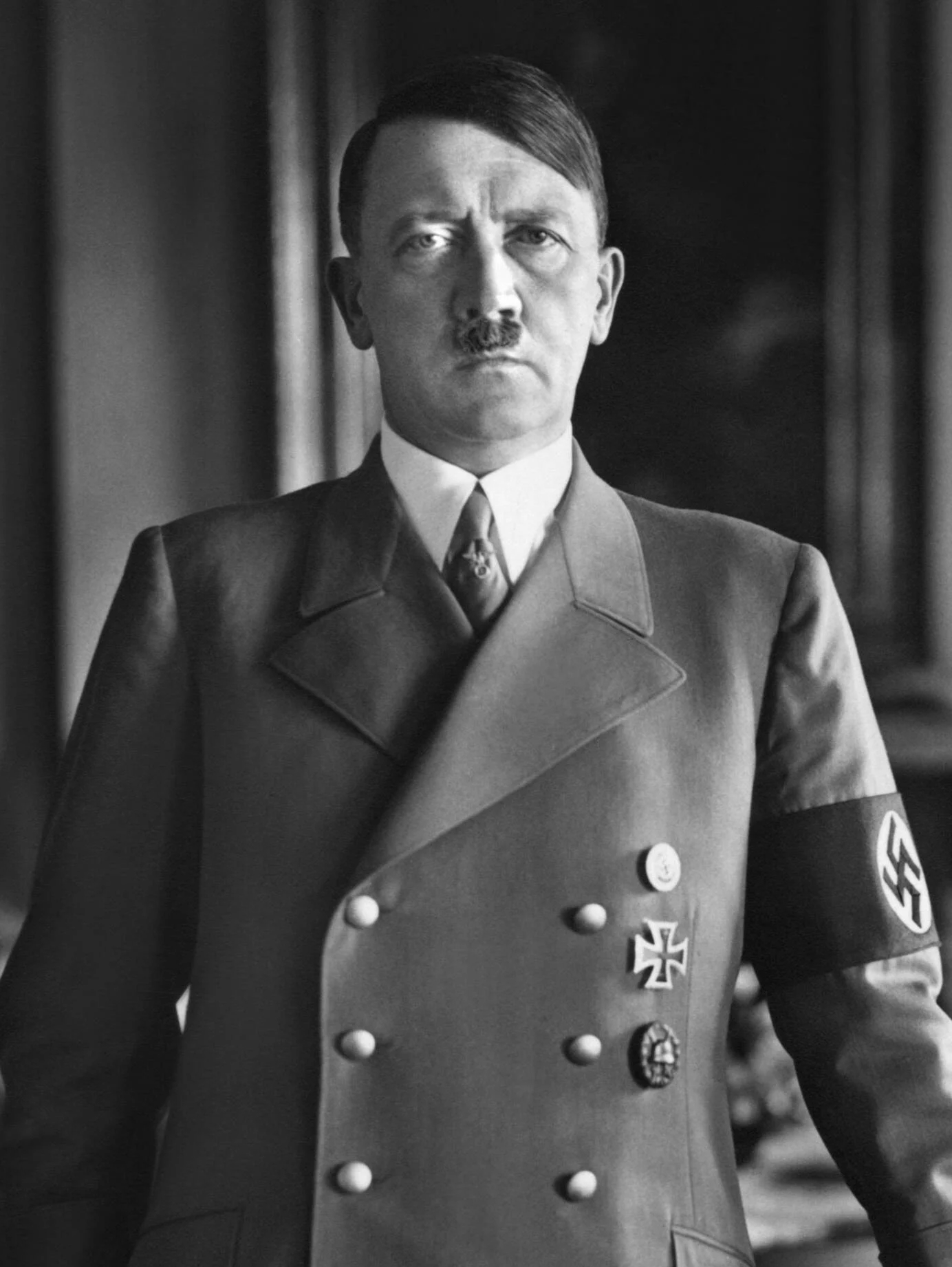
Adolf Hitler

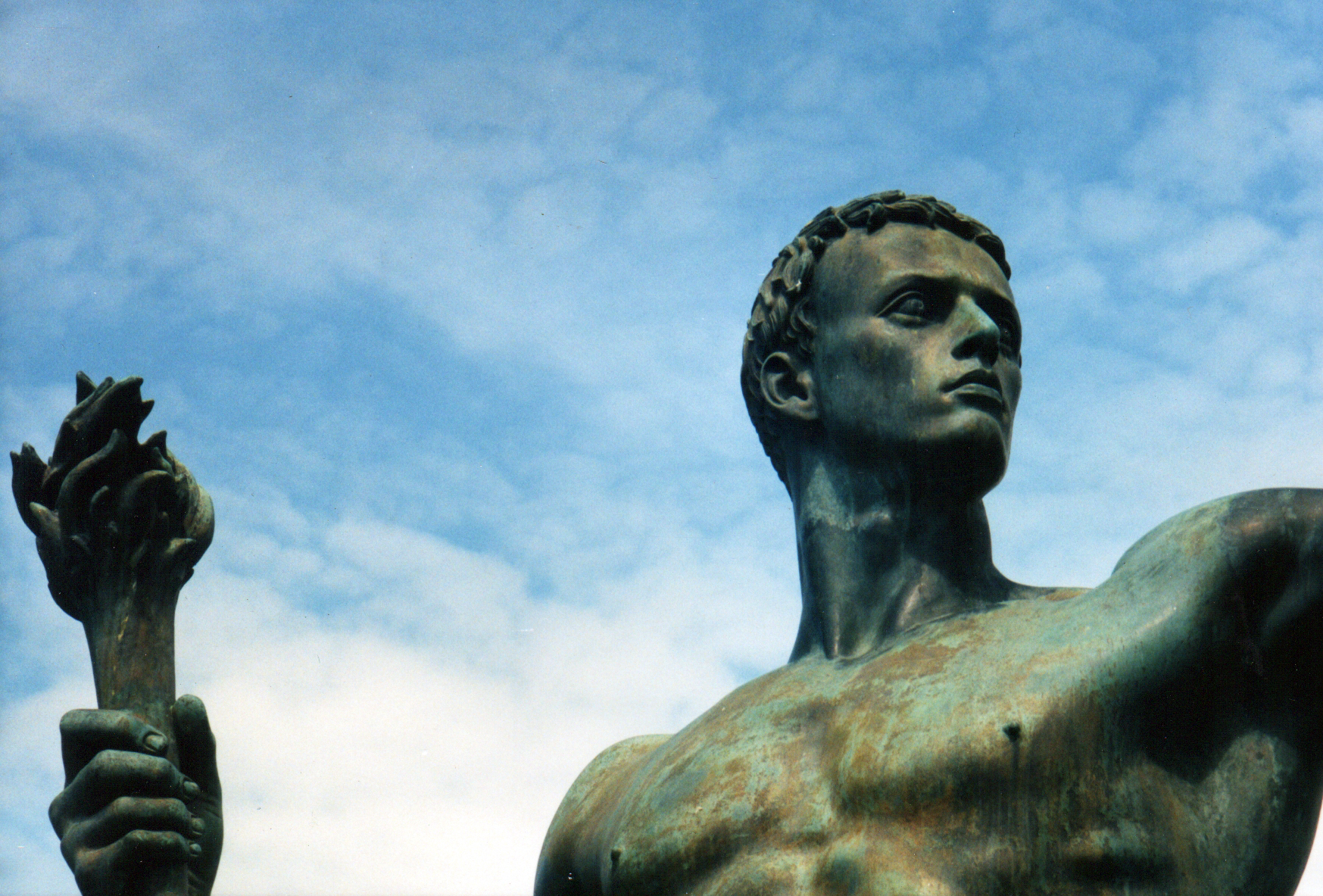
Arno Breker's 1939 neoclassical sculpture Die Partei (The Party), which flanked one of the entrances to the Reich Chancellery in Berlin. The sculpture emphasizes what the Nazi Party considered to be desirable Aryan characteristics.

The ideology of Nazism was based upon the conception of the ancient Aryan race being a superior race, holding the highest position in the racial hierarchy and that the Nordic-type Germanic peoples were the most racially pure existing peoples of Aryan stock. The Nazi conception of the Aryan race arose from earlier proponents of a supremacist conception of the race as described by racial theorist figures such as Arthur de Gobineau and Houston Stewart Chamberlain.

Nazi racial theorist Hans F. K. Günther identified the European race as having five subtype races: Nordic, Mediterranean, Dinaric, Alpine, and East Baltic. Günther applied a Nordicist conception that Nordics were the highest in the racial hierarchy amongst these five European subtype races. In his book Rassenkunde des deutschen Volkes (1922) (Racial Science of the German People), Günther recognized Germans as being composed of all five European subtypes, but emphasized the strong Nordic heritage amongst Germans. Günther believed Slavic people to be of Eastern race, one that was separate from Germans and Nordics, and warned about mixing German blood with Slavic one. He defined each racial subtype according to general physical appearance and their psychological qualities including their racial soul – referring to their emotional traits and religious beliefs, and provided detailed information on their hair, eye, and skin colours, facial structure. He provided photographs of Germans identified as Nordic in places like Baden, Stuttgart, Salzburg, and Schwaben; and provided photographs of Germans he identified as Alpine and Mediterranean types, especially in Vorarlberg, Bavaria, and the Black Forest region of Baden. Adolf Hitler read Rassenkunde des deutschen Volkes, which influenced his racial policy and resulted in Günther's Nazi-backed attainment of a position in the anthropology department at the University of Jena in 1932 where Hitler attended Günther's inaugural lecture.

Günther distinguished Aryans from Jews, and identified Jews as descending from non-European races, particularly from what he classified as the Near Asian race (Vorderasiatische Rasse), more commonly known as the Armenoid race, and said that such origins rendered Jews fundamentally different from and incompatible with Germans and most Europeans. This association of Jews with the Armenoid type had been utilized by Zionist Jews who claimed that Jews were a group within that type. He claimed that the Near Eastern race descended from the Caucasus in the fifth and fourth millennia BC, and that it had expanded into Asia Minor and Mesopotamia and eventually to the west coast of the Eastern Mediterranean Sea. Aside from ascribing Armenians and Jews as having Near Eastern characteristics, he ascribed them to several other contemporary peoples; he included some Greeks, Turks, Syrians, and Iranians as having these characteristics as well. In his work Racial Characteristics of the Jewish People, he defined the racial soul of the Near Eastern race as emphasizing a commercial spirit (Handelgeist), and described them as artful traders – a term that Günther ascribed as being used by Jewish racial theorist Samuel Weissenberg to describe contemporary Armenians, Greeks, and Jews. Günther added to that description of the Near Eastern type as being composed primarily of commercially spirited and artful traders, by claiming that the type held strong psychological manipulation skills that aided them in trade. He claimed that the Near Eastern race had been bred not so much for the conquest and exploitation of nature as it was for the conquest and exploitation of people.

Hitler's conception of the Aryan Herrenvolk (master race) explicitly excluded the vast majority of Slavs, regarding the Slavs as having dangerous Jewish and Asiatic influences. Because of this, the Nazis declared Slavs to be Untermenschen (subhumans). Exceptions were made for a small percentage of Slavs who were seen by the Nazis to be descended from German settlers and therefore fit to be Germanised to be considered part of the Aryan folk or nation. Hitler described Slavs as a mass of born slaves who feel the need of a master. Hitler declared that the Geneva Conventions were not applicable to Slavs because they were subhumans, and German soldiers were thus permitted to ignore the Geneva Conventions in World War II with regard to Slavs. Hitler called Slavs a rabbit family meaning they were intrinsically idle and disorganized. Nazi Germany's propaganda minister Joseph Goebbels had media speak of Slavs as primitive animals who were from the Siberian tundra who were like a dark wave of filth. The Nazi notion of Slavs being inferior non-Aryans was part of the agenda for creating Lebensraum (living space) for Germans and other Germanic people in eastern Europe that was initiated during World War II under Generalplan Ost: millions of Germans and other Germanic settlers would be moved into conquered territories of Eastern Europe, while the original Slavic inhabitants were to be annihilated, removed, or enslaved. Nazi Germany's ally the Independent State of Croatia rejected the common conception that Croats were primarily a Slavic people and claimed that Croats were primarily the descendants of the Germanic Goths. However the Nazi regime continued to classify Croats as a subhuman in spite of the alliance. Nazi Germany's policy changed towards Slavs in response to military manpower shortages, in which it accepted Slavs to serve in its armed forces within occupied territories, in spite of them being considered subhuman, as a pragmatic means to resolve such manpower shortages.

Shortly after the Nazis came to power in 1933 they passed the Law for the Restoration of the Professional Civil Service law which required all civil servants to provide proof of their Aryan ancestry and defined non-Aryan as a person with one Jewish grandparent. In 1933, the German Interior Ministry official Albert Gorter drafted an official definition of the Aryan race for the new law which included all non-Jewish Europeans, this definition was unacceptable by the Nazis. However, Achim Gerke revised Gorter's draft of the Civil Service Law classifying Aryans as people tribally related to German blood. The Nuremberg Race Laws of 1935 classified people with "German or related blood" as being racially acceptable.

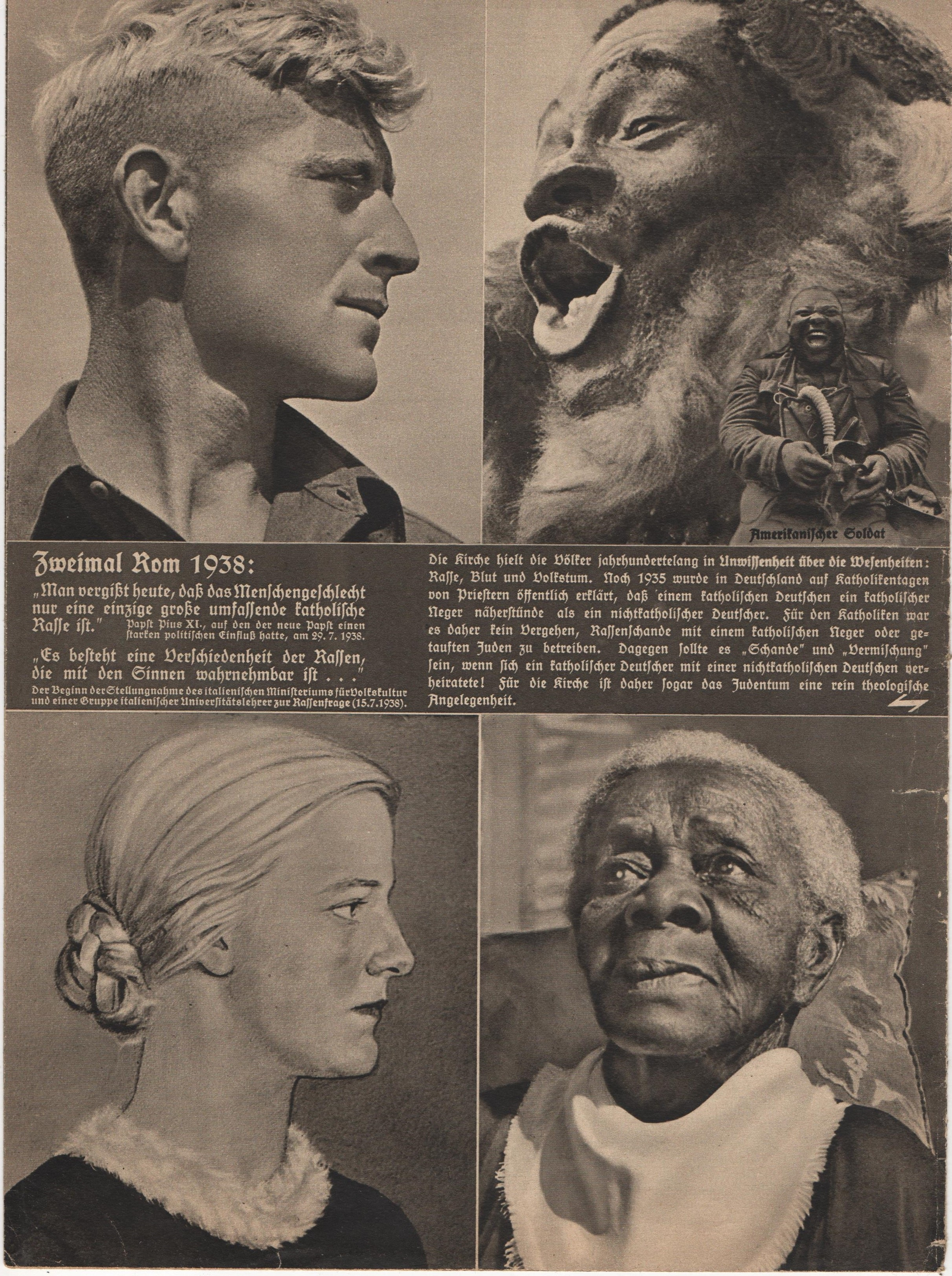
A Nazi German propaganda poster lambasting the Catholic Church for its relatively anti-racist, philosemitic rhetoric (Note: Translation: "For centuries the Church kept people ignorant of their essences: race, blood, and nationality. As recently as 1935, priests publicly declared on Catholic holidays in Germany that a Catholic German was closer to a Catholic Negro than to a non-Catholic German. It was therefore not an offense for the Catholic to engage in racial disgrace with a Catholic Negro or a baptized Jew. On the other hand, it should be "shameful" and "mixing" when a Catholic German married a non-Catholic German! For the Church, therefore, even Judaism is a purely theological matter.")

The question of whether Italians were Aryan enough was questioned by the Nazi racial theorists. Hitler viewed northern Italians as more Aryan than southern Italians. The Nazis viewed the downfall of the Roman Empire as being the result of the pollution of blood from racial intermixing, claiming that Italians were a hybrid of races, including black African races. Hitler even mentioned his view of the presence of Negroid blood in the Mediterranean peoples during his first meeting with Mussolini in 1934. The definition of Aryan remained in constant flux to such an extent that the Nazis questioned whether European ethnic groups such as Finns or Hungarians were to be classified as Aryans. Hungarians were classified as tribally alien but not necessarily blood alien, in 1934 the Nazis published a pamphlet which declared Magyars (which it did not define) as Aryans. The following year, an article published by the Nazis admitted that there were disputes over the racial status of Hungarians. As late as 1943, there were disputes over whether Hungarians were to be classified as Aryan. In 1942, Hitler declared that the Finns were racially related to Germanic neighboring peoples, although there is no evidence to suggest that this was based on anything racial. However, that same year Hitler declared Finland to be a "Nordic state" with a racially "Nordic people". Certain non-European groups were also considered to be Aryans by the Nazis. Iranians were classified as Aryans in 1936 through a special decree by the Reich Cabinet, affirming their racial affinity with Germans. Iranians were exempted from all restrictions to the Nuremberg Laws, as a result. Hitler himself also declared Iran to be an "Aryan country." The Nazis generally regarded the population of the Caucasus to be "non-Slavic and Aryan"; Georgians and Armenians were both considered Aryans, although Hitler personally held doubts towards Armenians. Hitler referred to Georgians as containing "some Nordic blood."

The idea of the Northern origins of the Aryans was particularly influential in Germany. It was widely believed that the Vedic Aryans were ethnically identical to the Goths, Vandals and other ancient Germanic peoples of the Völkerwanderung. This idea was often intertwined with antisemitic ideas. The distinctions between the Aryan and Semitic peoples were based on the aforementioned linguistic and ethnic history. A complete, highly speculative theory of Aryan and anti-Semitic history can be found in Alfred Rosenberg's major work, The Myth of the Twentieth Century. Semitic peoples came to be seen as a foreign presence within Aryan societies, and the Semitic peoples were often pointed to as the cause of conversion and destruction of social order and values leading to culture and civilization's downfall by proto-Nazi theorists such as Houston Stewart Chamberlain.

These and other ideas evolved into the Nazi use of the term Aryan race to refer to what they saw as being a superior race, which was narrowly defined by the Nazis as being identical with the Nordic race, followed by other sub-races of the Aryan race and excluding Slavs as non-Aryan. They worked to maintain the purity of this race through eugenics programs (including anti-miscegenation legislation, compulsory sterilization of the mentally ill and the mentally deficient, the execution of the institutionalized mentally ill as part of a euthanasia program).

Heinrich Himmler (the Reichsführer of the SS), the person ordered by Adolf Hitler to implement the Final Solution, or the Holocaust, told his personal masseur Felix Kersten that he always carried with him a copy of the ancient Aryan scripture, the Bhagavad Gita, because it relieved him of guilt about what he was doing – he felt that like the warrior Arjuna, he was simply doing his duty without attachment to his actions.

== Italian fascism and Aryanism ==
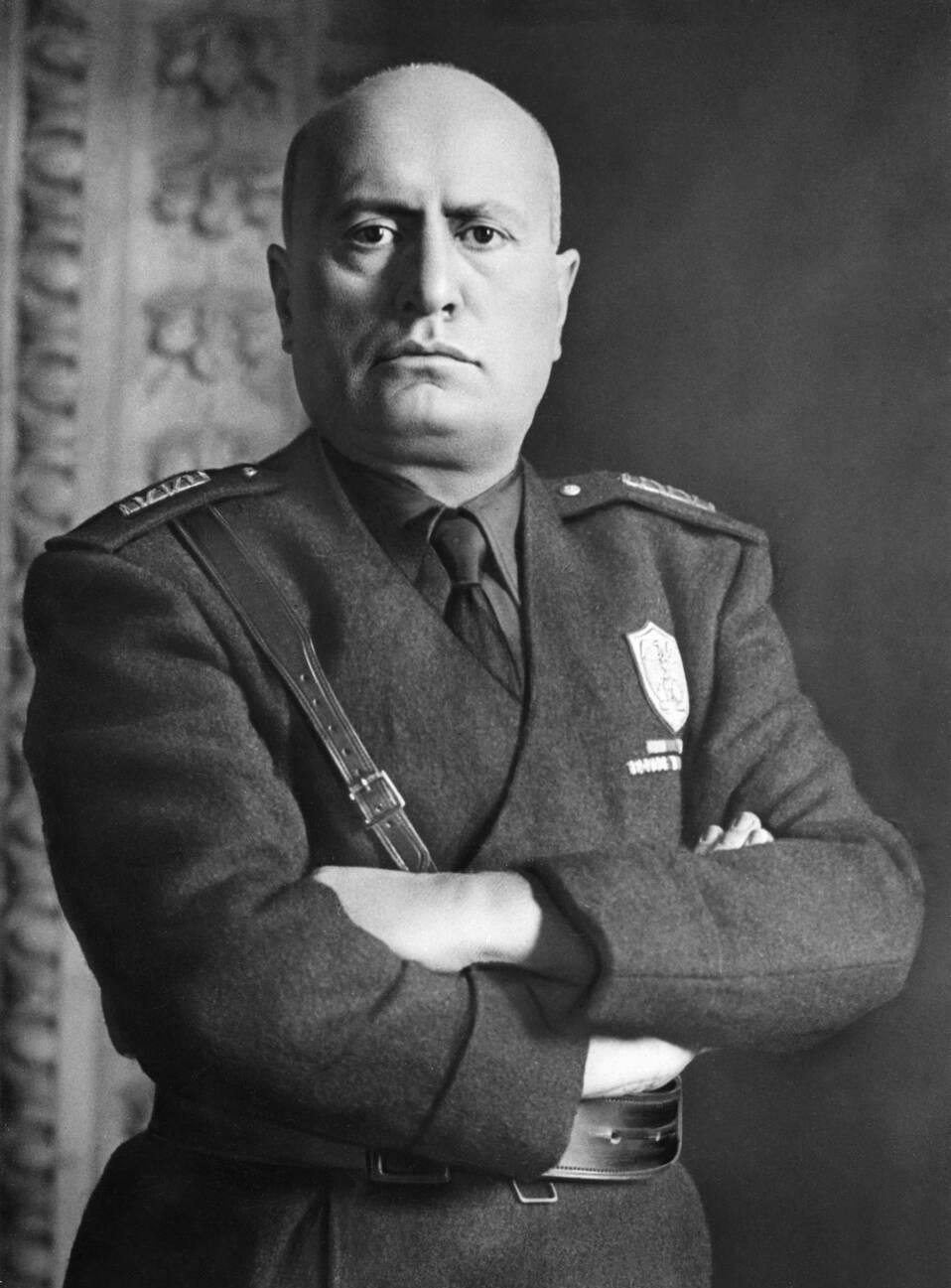
Benito Mussolini

In a 1921 speech in Bologna, Mussolini stated that fascism was "born out of a profound, perennial need of this our Aryan and Mediterranean race". In this speech Mussolini was referring to Italians as being the Mediterranean branch of the Aryan race, Aryan in the meaning of people of an Indo-European language and culture. Italian fascism emphasized that race was bound by spiritual and cultural foundations, and identified a racial hierarchy based on spiritual and cultural factors. While Italian Fascism based its conception of race on spiritual and cultural factors, Mussolini explicitly rejected notions that biologically pure races existed though biology was still considered a relevant factor in race.

Italian fascism strongly rejected the common Nordicist conception of the Aryan race that idealized pure Aryans as having certain physical traits that were defined as Nordic such as blond hair and blue eyes. The antipathy by Mussolini and other Italian Fascists to Nordicism was over the existence of what they viewed as the Mediterranean inferiority complex that they claimed had been instilled into Mediterraneans by the propagation of such theories by German and Anglo-Saxon Nordicists who viewed Mediterranean peoples as racially degenerate and thus in their view inferior. Mussolini refused to allow Italy to return again to this inferiority complex, initially, rejecting Nordicism. However traditional Nordicist claims of Mediterraneans being degenerate due to having a darker colour of skin than Nordics had long been rebuked in anthropology through the depigmentation theory that claimed that lighter-skinned peoples had been depigmented from a darker skin, this theory has since become a widely accepted view in anthropology. Anthropologist Carleton S. Coon in his work The Races of Europe (1939) subscribed to depigmentation theory that claimed that the Nordic race's light-coloured skin was the result of depigmentation from their ancestors of the Mediterranean race.

In the early 1930s, with the rise to power of the Nazi Party in Germany and with dictator Adolf Hitler's emphasis on a Nordicist conception of the Aryan race, strong tensions arose between the Fascists and the Nazis over racial issues. In 1934, in the aftermath of Austrian Nazis killing Austrian Chancellor Engelbert Dollfuss, an ally of Italy, Mussolini became enraged and responded by angrily denouncing Nazism. Mussolini rebuked Nazism's Nordicism, claiming that the Nazis' emphasizing of a common Nordic Germanic race was absurd, saying, "A Germanic race does not exist. We repeat. Does not exist. Scientists say so. Hitler says so." The fact that Germans were not purely Nordic was indeed acknowledged by prominent Nazi racial theorist Hans F. K. Günther in his book Rassenkunde des deutschen Volkes (1922) (Racial Science of the German People), where Günther recognized Germans as being composed of five Aryan subtype races: Nordic, Mediterranean, Dinaric, Alpine, and East Baltic while asserting that the Nordics were the highest in a racial hierarchy of the five subtypes.

By 1936, the tensions between Fascist Italy and Nazi Germany reduced and relations became more amicable. In 1936, Mussolini decided to launch a racial programme in Italy, and was interested in the racial studies being conducted by Giulio Cogni. Cogni was a Nordicist but did not equate Nordic identity with Germanic identity as was commonly done by German Nordicists. Cogni had travelled to Germany where he had become impressed by Nazi racial theory and sought to create his own version of racial theory. On 11 September 1936, Cogni sent Mussolini a copy of his newly published book Il Razzismo (1936). Cogni declared the racial affinity of the Mediterranean and Nordic racial subtypes of the Aryan race and claimed that the intermixing of Nordic Aryans and Mediterranean Aryans in Italy produced a superior synthesis of Aryan Italians. Cogni addressed the issue of racial differences between northern and southern Italians, declaring southern Italians were mixed between Aryan and non-Aryan races, that he claimed was most likely due to infiltration by Asiatic peoples in Roman times and later Arab invasions. As such, Cogni viewed Southern Italian Mediterraneans as being polluted with orientalizing tendencies. He would later change his idea and claim that Nordics and Southern Italians were closely related groups both racially and spiritually. His opinion was that they were generally responsible for what is the best in European civilization. Initially Mussolini was not impressed with Cogni's work, however Cogni's ideas entered into the official Fascist racial policy several years later.

In 1938 Mussolini was concerned that if Italian fascism did not recognize Nordic heritage within Italians, that the Mediterranean inferiority complex would return to Italian society. Therefore, in summer 1938, the Fascist government officially recognized Italians as having Nordic heritage and being of Nordic-Mediterranean descent. In a meeting with PNF members in June 1938, Mussolini identified himself as having Nordic heritage and declared that previous policy of focus on Mediterraneanism was to be replaced by a focus on Aryanism.

The Fascist regime began publication of the racialist magazine La Difesa della Razza in 1938. The Nordicist racial theorist Guido Landra took a major role in the early work of La Difesa, and published the Manifesto of Racial Scientists in the magazine in 1938. The Manifesto received substantial criticism, including its assertion of Italians being a pure race, as it was viewed as absurd. La Difesa published other theories that described long-term Nordic Aryan heritage amongst Italians, such as the theory that in the Eneolithic age Nordic Aryans arrived to Italy. Many of the writers took up the traditional Nordicist claim that the decline and fall of the Roman Empire was due to the arrival of Semitic immigrants. La Difesa's writers were divided on their claims that described how Italians extricated themselves from Semitic influence.

The Nordicist direction of Fascist racial policy was challenged in 1938 by a resurgence of the Mediterraneanist faction in the PNF. By 1939, the Mediterraneanists' advocacy of a nativist racial theory that rejected ascribing the achievements of the Italian people to Nordic peoples. This nativist racial policy was prominently promoted by Ugo Rellini. Rellini rejected the notion of large-scale invasions of Italy by Nordic Aryans in the Eneolithic age, and claimed that Italians were an indigenous people descended from the Cro-Magnons. Rellini claimed that Mediterranean and Nordic peoples arrived later and peacefully intermixed in small numbers with the indigenous Italian population.

In 1941 the PNF's Mediterraneanists through the influence of Giacomo Acerbo put forward a comprehensive definition of the Italian race. However these efforts were challenged by Mussolini's endorsement of Nordicist figures with the appointment of staunch spiritual Nordicist Alberto Luchini as head of Italy's Racial Office in May 1941, as well as with Mussolini becoming interested in Julius Evola's spiritual Nordicism in late 1941. Acerbo and the Mediterraneanists in his High Council on Demography and Race sought to bring the regime back to supporting Mediterraneanism by thoroughly denouncing the pro-Nordicist Manifesto of the Racial Scientists. The Council recognized Aryans as being a linguistic-based group, and condemned the Manifesto for denying the influence of pre-Aryan civilization on modern Italy, saying that the Manifesto constitutes an unjustifiable and undemonstrable negation of the anthropological, ethnological, and archaeological discoveries that have occurred and are occurring in our country. Furthermore, the Council denounced the Manifesto for implicitly crediting Germanic invaders of Italy in the guise of the Lombards for having a formative influence on the Italian race in a disproportional degree to the number of invaders and to their biological predominance. The Council claimed that the obvious superiority of the ancient Greeks and Romans in comparison with the ancient Germanic tribes made it inconceivable that Italian culture owed a debt to ancient Aryan Germans. The Council denounced the Manifesto's Nordicist attitude towards Mediterraneans that it claimed was considering them as slaves and was a repudiation of the entire Italian civilization.

== Neo-Nazism and Aryanism ==
The sun wheel has been used as a symbol of the Aryan race by some neo-Nazis.

Since the military defeat of Nazi Germany by the Allies in 1945, some neo-Nazis have developed a more inclusive definition of "Aryan", claiming that the peoples of Western Europe are the closest descendants of the ancient Aryans, with Nordic and Germanic peoples being the most "racially pure."

According to historian Nicholas Goodrick-Clarke, many neo-Nazis want to establish an autocratic state modeled after Nazi Germany to be called the Western Imperium. It is believed that this proposed state would be able to attain world domination by combining the nuclear arsenals of the four major Aryan world powers, the United States, the United Kingdom, France, and Russia under a single military command.

This proposed state would be led by a Führer-like figure called the Vindex, and would include all areas inhabited by the "Aryan race", as conceived by Neo-Nazis. Only those of the Aryan race would be full citizens of the state. The "Western Imperium" would embark on a vigorous and dynamic program of space exploration, followed by the creation by genetic engineering of a super race called Homo Galactica. The concept of the "Western Imperium" as outlined in the previous three sentences is based on the original concept of the Imperium as outlined in the 1947 book Imperium: The Philosophy of History and Politics by Francis Parker Yockey as further updated, extended and refined in the early 1990s in pamphlets published by neo-nazi David Myatt.

== See also ==
- Ahnenpass
- Aryan Games
- Aryan paragraph
- Aryanization
- Esotericism in Germany and Austria
- Invented tradition
- Iranian nationalism
- Ariosophy
- British Israelism
- Christian Identity
- French Israelism
- Honorary Aryan
- Root race
- White supremacy
- Wotansvolk
- The Creativity Movement
