= Nordicism =

Ideology of "Nordic race" supremacy

Nordicism is a racialist ideology which views the "Nordic race" as a superior racial group. Some notable and influential Nordicist works include Madison Grant's book The Passing of the Great Race (1916); Arthur de Gobineau's An Essay on the Inequality of the Human Races (1853); the various writings of Lothrop Stoddard; Houston Stewart Chamberlain's The Foundations of the Nineteenth Century (1899); and, to a lesser extent, William Z. Ripley's The Races of Europe (1899). The ideology became popular in the late-19th and 20th centuries in Germanic-speaking Europe, Northwestern Europe, Central Europe, and Northern Europe, as well as in North America and Australia.

The belief that Nordic ancestry is superior to all others was originally embraced as "Anglo-Saxonism" in England and the United States, "Teutonicism" in Germany, and "Frankisism" in Northern France. The notion of the superiority of the "Nordic race" and the superiority of the Northwestern European nations that were associated with this supposed race influenced the United States' Immigration Act of 1924 (which effectively banned or severely limited the immigration of Jews, Italians, and other Southern and Eastern Europeans) and the later Immigration and Nationality Act of 1952, and it was also present in other countries outside Northwestern Europe and the United States, such as Australia, Canada, and South Africa.

By the 1930s, the Nazis claimed that the Nordic race was the most superior branch of the "Aryan race" and constituted a master race (Herrenrasse). The full application of Aryanism—the invasion of Poland and further conquest in the pursuit of Lebensraum, 'living space'—was the immediate catalyst for World War II and led directly to the Holocaust.

== Background ==
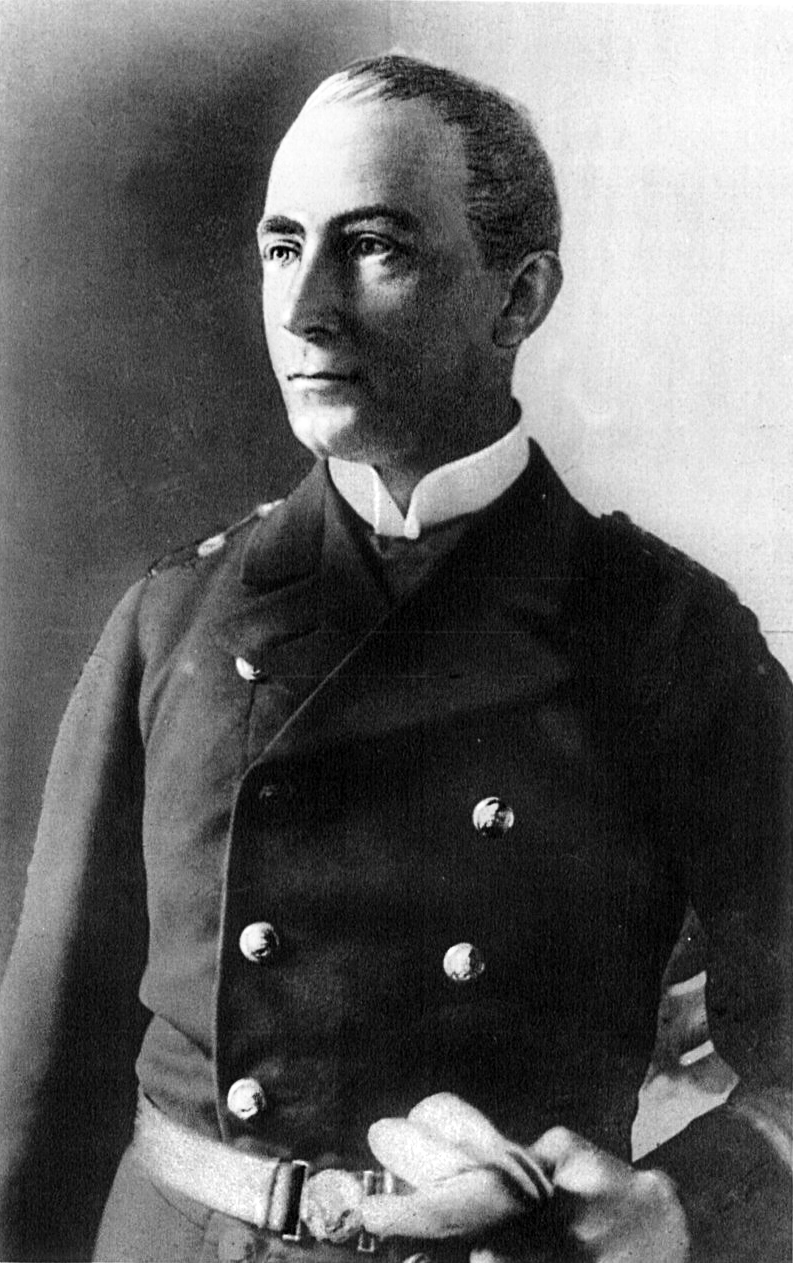
Meyers Blitz-Lexikon (Leipzig, 1932) shows German war hero Karl von Müller as an example of the Nordic type.

The Russian-born French anthropologist Joseph Deniker initially proposed "nordique" (simply meaning "northern") as an "ethnic group" (a term that he coined). He defined nordique by referring to a set of physical characteristics: the concurrence of somewhat wavy hair, light eyes, reddish skin, tall stature and a dolichocephalic skull.

In the mid-19th century, scientific racism developed the theory of Aryanism, holding that Europeans ("Aryans") were an innately superior branch of humanity, responsible for most of its greatest achievements. Aryanism was derived from the idea that the original speakers of the Indo-European languages constituted a distinctive race or subrace of the larger Caucasian race.

Its principal proponent was Arthur de Gobineau in his Essay on the Inequality of the Human Races (1855). Though Gobineau did not equate Nordic people with Aryans, he argued that Germanic people were the best modern representatives of the Aryan race. Adapting the comments of Tacitus and other Roman writers, he argued that "pure" Northerners regenerated Europe after the Roman Empire declined due to racial "dilution" of its leadership.

By the 1880s, a number of linguists and anthropologists argued that the Aryans themselves had originated somewhere in northern Europe. Theodor Poesche proposed that the Aryans originated in the vast Rokitno, or Pinsk Marshes, then in the Russian Empire, now covering much of the southern part of Belarus and the north-west of Ukraine, but it was Karl Penka who popularised the idea that the Aryans had emerged in Scandinavia and could be identified by the distinctive Nordic characteristics of light hair and blue eyes.

The biologist Thomas Henry Huxley agreed with him, coining the term Xanthochroi to refer to fair-skinned Europeans, as opposed to darker Mediterranean people, whom Huxley called Melanochroi. It was Huxley who also concluded that the Melanochroi, whom he described as "dark whites", are of a mixture of the Xanthochroi and Australioids.

This distinction was repeated by Charles Morris in his book The Aryan Race (1888), which argued that the original Aryans could be identified by their blond hair and other Nordic features, such as dolichocephaly (long skull). The argument was given extra impetus by the French anthropologist Vacher de Lapouge in his book L'Aryen, in which he argued that the "dolichocephalic-blond" people were natural leaders, destined to rule over more brachycephalic (short-skulled) people.

The philosopher Friedrich Nietzsche also referred in his writings to "blond beasts": lion-like amoral adventurers who were supposed to be the progenitors of creative cultures. In On the Genealogy of Morals (1887), he wrote, "In Latin malus ... could indicate the vulgar man as the dark one, especially as the black-haired one, as the pre-Aryan dweller of the Italian soil which distinguished itself most clearly through his colour from the blonds who became their masters, namely the Aryan conquering race." However, Nietzsche thought of these "blond beasts" not as a racial type, but as the ideal aristocratic personality, which can appear in any society: "the Roman, Arabic, German, and Japanese nobility, the Homeric heroes, the Scandinavian Vikings, are all alike in this need."

By the early 20th century, the concept of a "masterly" Nordic race had become familiar enough that the British psychologist William McDougall, writing in 1920, stated:

Among all the disputes and uncertainties of the ethnographers about the races of Europe, one fact stands out clearly—namely, that we can distinguish a race of northerly distribution and origin, characterised physically by fair colour of hair and skin and eyes, by tall stature and dolichocephaly (i.e. long shape of head), and mentally by great independence of character, individual initiative and tenacity of will. Many names have been used to denote this type, ... . It is also called the Nordic type.

Nordicists claimed that Nordics had formed upper tiers of ancient civilisations, even in the Mediterranean civilisations of antiquity, which had declined once this dominant race had been assimilated. Thus they argued that ancient evidence suggested that leading Romans like Nero, Sulla and Cato were blond or red-haired.

Some Nordicists admitted that the Mediterranean race was superior to the Nordic in terms of artistic ability. However, the Nordic race was still considered superior on the basis that, although Mediterranean peoples were culturally sophisticated, it was the Nordics who were alleged to be the innovators and the conquerors, having an adventurous spirit that the spirit of no other race could match.

Opponents of Nordicism rejected these arguments. The anti-Nordicist writer Giuseppe Sergi argued in his influential book The Mediterranean Race (1901) that there was no evidence that the upper tiers of ancient societies were Nordic, insisting that historical and anthropological evidence contradicted such claims. Sergi argued that Mediterraneans constituted "the greatest race in the world", with a creative edge absent in the Nordic race. According to him, Mediterraneans were the creators of all the major ancient civilisations, from Mesopotamia to Rome.

This argument was later repeated by C. G. Seligman, who wrote that "it must, I think, be recognised that the Mediterranean race has actually more achievement to its credit than any other". Even Carleton Coon insisted that among Greeks "the Nordic element is weak, as it probably has been since the days of Homer ... It is my personal reaction to the living Greeks that their continuity with their ancestors of the ancient world is remarkable, rather than the opposite."

Griffith Taylor argued that the Alpine race were slightly superior to the Nordic race in terms of their work ethic.

== United States ==
[C]onservation of that race which has given us the true spirit of Americanism is not a matter of either racial pride or of racial prejudice; it is a matter of love of country, of a true sentiment which is based upon knowledge and the lessons of history rather than upon the sentimentalism which is fostered by ignorance. If I were asked: What is the greatest danger which threatens the American republic to-day? I would certainly reply: The gradual dying out among our people of those hereditary traits through which the principles of our religious, political and social foundations were laid down and their insidious replacement by traits of less noble character.

— Henry Fairfield Osborn, July 13, 1916

In the United States, the primary spokesman for Nordicism was the eugenicist Madison Grant. His 1916 book, The Passing of the Great Race, or the Racial Basis of European History about Nordicism was highly influential among racial thinking and government policy making.

Grant used the theory as justification for immigration policies of the 1920s, arguing that the immigrants from certain areas of Europe, such as Italians and other Southern Europeans and Eastern Europeans, represented a lesser type of European and their numbers in the United States should not be increased. Grant and others urged this as well as the complete restriction of non-Europeans, such as the Chinese and Japanese.

Grant argued the Nordic race had been responsible for most of humanity's great achievements (he lists Dante, Raphael, Titian, Michelangelo, and Leonardo da Vinci as examples of Nordics). Admixture was "race suicide" and unless eugenic policies were enacted, the Nordic race would be supplanted by inferior races. Future president Calvin Coolidge agreed, stating "Biological laws tell us that certain divergent people will not mix or blend. The Nordics propagate themselves successfully. With other races, the outcome shows deterioration on both sides." Grant argues that Nordics founded the United States and the English "language", and formed the ruling classes of ancient Greece and Rome. An analysis performed by Grant alleges that Northwestern Europeans are less criminal than Southern and Eastern Europeans (see also Race and crime).

The Immigration Act of 1924 was signed into law by President Coolidge. This was designed to reduce the number of immigrants from Southern Europe, Southeast Europe, Eastern Europe and Russia, exclude Asian immigrants altogether, and favour immigration from Great Britain, Ireland, Germany and Scandinavia, while also permitting immigration from Latin America.

The spread of these ideas also affected popular culture. F. Scott Fitzgerald invokes Grant's ideas through a character in part of The Great Gatsby, and Hilaire Belloc jokingly rhapsodized the "Nordic man" in a poem and essay in which he satirised the stereotypes of Nordics, Alpines and Mediterraneans.

== Germany ==
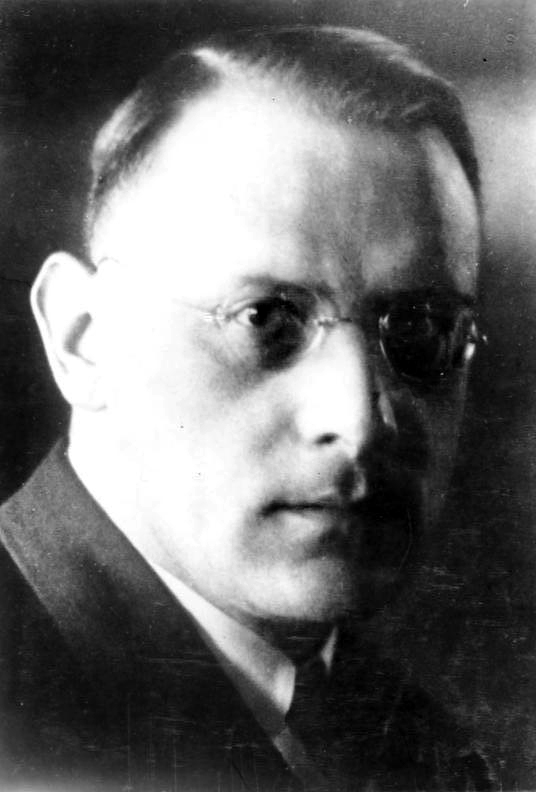
Hans F. K. Günther (1891–1968), prominent German racial theorist who helped to popularise Nordicism in his country

In Germany the influence of Nordicism remained powerful—it became known there as "Nordischer Gedanke" (Nordic thought).

This phrase, coined by the German eugenicists Erwin Baur, Eugen Fischer and Fritz Lenz, appeared in their 1921 work Human Heredity, which insisted on the innate superiority of the Nordic race. Adapting the arguments of German philosopher Arthur Schopenhauer (1788–1860) and others to Darwinian theory, they argued that the "Nordic" qualities of initiative and will-power identified by earlier writers had arisen from natural selection, because of the tough landscape in which Nordic peoples evolved. This had ensured that weaker individuals had not survived.

By the early 19th century, Nordicism was attached to emerging theories of racial hierarchy. The German philosopher Arthur Schopenhauer attributed cultural primacy to the white race:

The highest civilization and culture, apart from the ancient Hindus and Egyptians, are found exclusively among the white races; and even with many dark peoples, the ruling caste or race is fairer in colour than the rest and has, therefore, evidently immigrated, for example, the Brahmins, the Incas, and the rulers of the South Sea Islands. All this is due to the fact that necessity is the mother of invention because those tribes that emigrated early to the north, and there gradually became white, had to develop all their intellectual powers and invent and perfect all the arts in their struggle with need, want and misery, which in their many forms were brought about by the climate.

The eugenicist Madison Grant argued in his 1916 book, The Passing of the Great Race, that the Nordic race had been responsible for most of humanity's great achievements, and that admixture was "race suicide". In this book, Europeans who are not of Germanic origin but have Nordic characteristics such as blonde/red hair and blue/green/gray eyes, were considered to be a Nordic admixture and suitable for Aryanization.

This argument derived from earlier eugenicist and Social Darwinist ideas. According to the authors, the Nordic race arose in the ice age, from:

quite a small group which, under stress of rapidly changing conditions (climate, beasts of the chase) was exposed to exceptionally rigorous selection and was persistently inbred, thus acquiring the peculiar characteristics which persist today as the exclusive heritage of the Nordic race ... Philological, archaeological and anthropological researches combine to indicate that the primal home of the Indo-Germanic [i.e. Aryan] languages must have been in Northern Europe.

They went on to argue that "the original Indo-Germanic civilisation" was carried by Nordic migrants to India, and that the physiognomies of upper-caste Indians "disclose a Nordic origin".

By this time, Germany was well-accustomed to theories of race and racial superiority due to the long-standing influence of the Völkisch movement, with its philosophy that Germans constituted a unique people, or Volk, linked by common blood. While Volkism was popular mainly among Germany's lower classes and offered a romanticised version of ethnic nationalism, Nordicism attracted German anthropologists and eugenicists.

Hans F. K. Günther, one of Fischer's students, first defined "Nordic thought" in his programmatic book Der Nordische Gedanke unter den Deutschen (1927). Günther became the pre-eminent German in this field; his Short Ethnology of the German People (German: Kleine Rassenkunde des deutschen Volkes, 1929, an abbreviated popularisation of his Rassenkunde des deutschen Volkes of 1922) was promoted widely by the Nazi education system.

In his Rassenkunde des deutschen Volkes (Race-Lore of the German Volk), published 1922, Günther identified five principal European races instead of three, adding the East Baltic race and Dinaric race to Ripley's categories. He used the term "Ostic" instead of "Alpine". He focused on the races' supposedly distinct mental attributes.

Günther criticised the Völkish idea, stating that the Germans were not racially unified, but were actually one of the most racially diverse peoples in Europe. Despite this, many Völkists who merged Völkism and Nordicism, most notably the Nazis, embraced Günther's ideas.

=== Nazi Nordicism ===
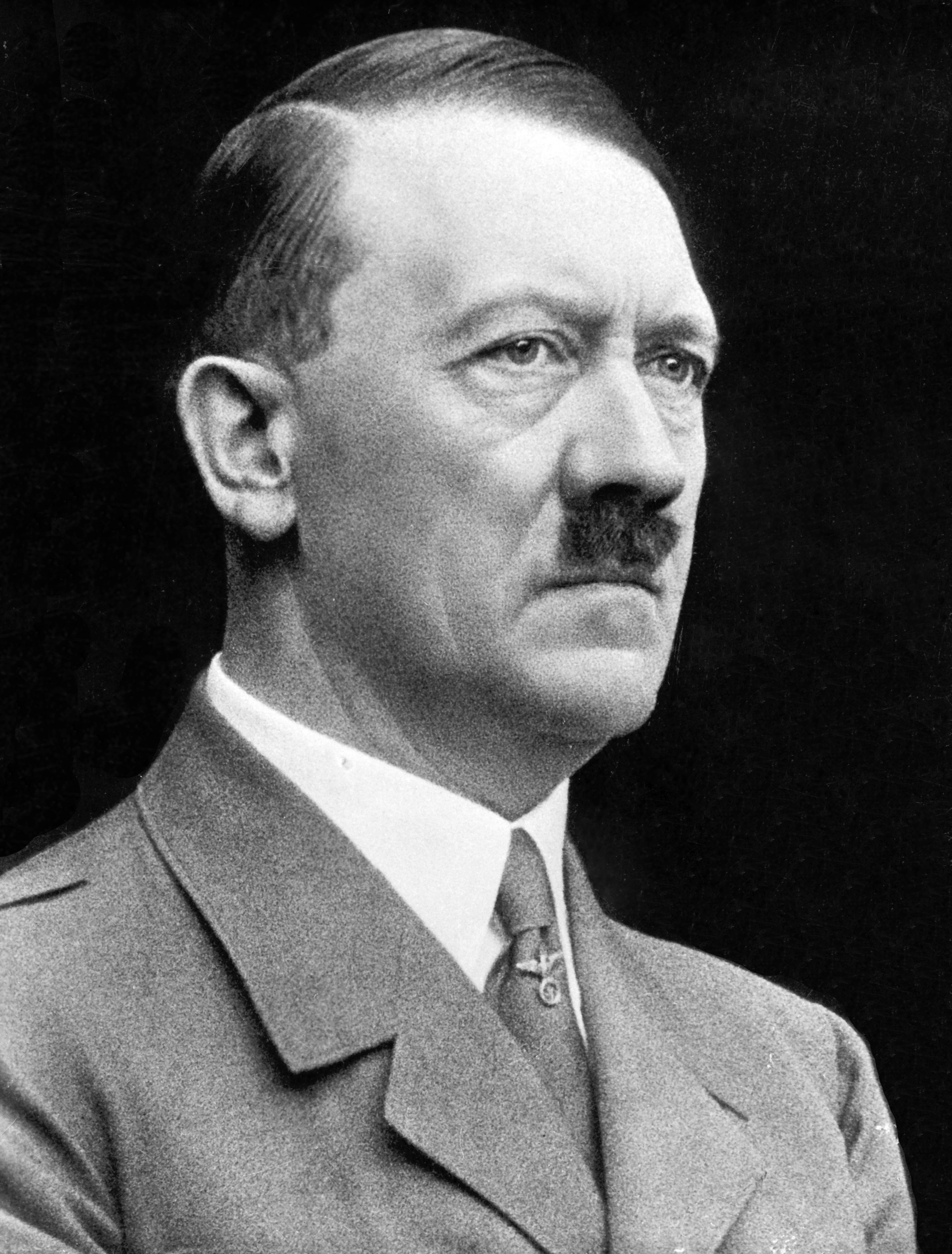
Adolf Hitler was a proponent of the concept of the Aryan race and of Aryanism. He viewed the Nordic racial subtype as the apex of the racial hierarchy within the Aryan race.

Nazi Germany promulgated Nordicism based on the idea of a superior Germanic people or Aryan race in Germany during the early 20th century. These notions of Aryan racial superiority ("Aryanism") were developed in the 19th century, maintaining the belief that white people were members of an Aryan "master race" that was superior to other races, particularly the Jews, who were described as the "Semitic race", Slavs, and Gypsies, who they associated with "cultural sterility".

To preserve the Aryan race or Nordic race, the Nazis introduced the Nuremberg Laws in 1935, which forbade sexual relations and marriages between Germans and Jews, and later additionally forbidding Blacks and Romani. The Nazis used the Mendelian inheritance theory to argue that social traits were innate, claiming that there was a racial nature associated with certain general traits such as inventiveness or criminal behavior. Nazi ideals were combined with a eugenics program that aimed for racial hygiene through compulsory sterilization of sick individuals and extermination of Untermenschen ("subhumans"): Jews, Slavs, and Romani, which eventually culminated in the Holocaust.

==== Influence from France ====
Arthur de Gobineau, a French racial theorist and aristocrat, blamed the fall of the ancien régime in France on racial degeneracy caused by racial intermixing, which he argued had destroyed the "purity" of the Nordic or Germanic race. Gobineau's theories, which attracted a strong following in Germany and later attracted a strong following in the Reich, emphasized the existence of an irreconcilable polarity between Aryan or Germanic peoples and Jewish culture.

The pessimism of Gobineau's message did not lend itself to political action because he did not believe that humanity could be saved from racial degeneration. However, writing in April 1939, Rowbotham declared: "So after nearly a hundred years, the fantastic pessimistic philosophy of the brilliant French diplomat is seized upon and twisted to the use of a mystic demagogue who finds in the idea of the pure Aryan an excuse for thrusting civilization dangerously near back to the Dark Ages."

His racist ideology, through rooted in social and political concerns and though claiming to explain the nature of society itself, could not on his own terms effect any transformation. But Gobineau unfortunately failed to realize the degree to which such a theory—whatever his own view of its impotence—might be capable of use and adaptation by others to affect society and history. His work would in time be plundered by racists with an interest in preaching explicitly reformatory doctrines.

==== Influence from the United States ====
As Alfred Rosenberg, the Nazi Party's chief racial theorist, oversaw the construction of a human racial "ladder" that justified Hitler's racial and ethnic policies, by promoting the Nordic theory that regarded Nordics as the "master race", a race which was superior to all other races, including other Aryans (Indo-Europeans), he used the racial term Untermensch from the title of Klansman Lothrop Stoddard's The Revolt Against Civilization: The Menace of the Under-man (1922). An advocate of the U.S. immigration laws that favored Northern Europeans, Stoddard wrote primarily on the alleged dangers posed by "colored" peoples to white civilization, and wrote The Rising Tide of Color Against White World-Supremacy in 1920.

In establishing a restrictive entry system for Germany in 1925, Hitler wrote of his admiration for America's immigration laws: "The American Union categorically refuses the immigration of physically unhealthy elements, and simply excludes the immigration of certain races." German praise for America's institutional racism, previously found in Hitler's Mein Kampf, was continuous throughout the early 1930s. Nazi lawyers were advocates of the use of American models; race-based U.S. citizenship and anti-miscegenation laws directly inspired the Nazis' two principal Nuremberg Laws—the Citizenship Law and the Blood Law.

==== Later influences ====
Adolf Hitler read Human Heredity shortly before he wrote Mein Kampf (published 1925–1926); he regarded it as scientific proof of the racial basis of civilisation. The Nazi ideologist Alfred Rosenberg also repeated Human Heredity's arguments in his book The Myth of the Twentieth Century (1930).

Nazi racial theories saw the Atlanteans as a race of Nordic supermen, and Alfred Rosenberg wrote of a "Nordic-Atlantean" master race whose civilisation was "lost through inward corruption and betrayal". According to Rosenberg, the Nordic race had evolved in a now-lost landmass off the coast of Europe (perhaps the mythical Atlantis), migrated through northern Europe and expanded further south to Iran and India where it founded the Aryan cultures of Zoroastrianism and Hinduism. Like Grant and others, Rosenberg argued that the entrepreneurial energy of the Nordics had "degenerated" when they mixed with "inferior" peoples.

==== Timeline ====
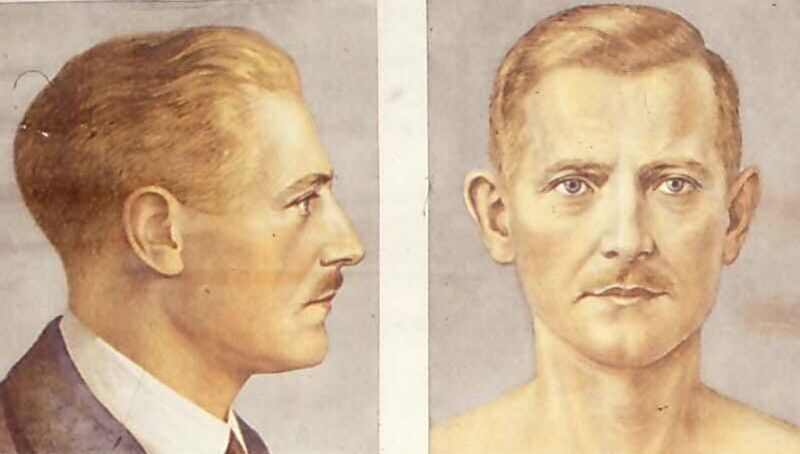
Illustration of the Nordic type from a Nazi wall chart (c. 1935)

With Adolf Hitler's rise to power, the Nordic theory became the norm within German culture. In some cases, the "Nordic" concept became an almost abstract ideal rather than a mere racial categorization. In 1933 for example, Hermann Gauch wrote (in a book which was banned in the Third Reich) that the fact that "birds can be taught to talk better than other animals is explained by the fact that their mouths are Nordic in structure". He further claimed that in humans, "the shape of the Nordic gum allows a superior movement of the tongue, which is the reason why Nordic talking and singing are richer".

Alongside such extreme views, a more mainstream Nordic theory became institutionalized. Hans F. K. Günther, who joined the Nazi Party in 1932, was praised as a pioneer in racial thinking, a shining light of Nordic theory. Most official Nazi comments on the Nordic race were based on Günther's works, and Alfred Rosenberg presented Günther with a medal for his work in anthropology.

Robert Ley, the head of the German Labour Front and of the Nazi Party organisation, discussed racial purity and the Nordic race in 1935:

Who of us is racially pure? Even if somebody's appearance is Nordic he might be a bastard inside. That somebody is blond and blue-eyed does not mean that he is racially pure. He might even be a degenerate coward. Bastardization shows in different aspects. We have to be on our guard against racial arrogance. Racial arrogance would be as devastating as hatred among classes.

Eugen Fischer and Fritz Lenz were also appointed to senior positions overseeing the policy of Racial Hygiene. Madison Grant's book was the first non-German book to be translated and published by the Nazi Reich press, and Grant proudly displayed to his friends a letter from Hitler claiming that the book was "his Bible."

The Nazi state used such ideas about the differences between European races as justifications for their various discriminatory and coercive policies which culminated in The Holocaust. Ironically, in the first edition of his popular book, Grant classified the Germans as a primarily Nordic racial group, but in the second edition (published after the US had entered World War I), Grant re-classified the now enemy power as a nation which was dominated by "inferior" Alpines.

Günther's work agreed with Grant's, and the German anthropologist frequently stated that the Germans were not a fully Nordic people.. Hitler himself was later to downplay the importance of Nordicism in public for this very reason.. The standard tripartite model placed most of the population of Hitler's Germany in the Alpine category.

J. Kaup led a movement opposed to Günther. Kaup took the view that a German nation, all of whose citizens belonged to a "German race" in a populationist sense, offered a more convenient sociotechnical tool than Günther's concept of an ideal Nordic type to which only a very few Germans could belong.

Nazi legislation which identified the ethnic and "racial" affinities of the Jews reflected the populationist concept of race. Discrimination was not limited to Jews who belonged to the "Oriental-Armenoid" race, it was directed against all members of the Jewish ethnic population.

By 1939, Hitler had abandoned Nordicist rhetoric in favor of the belief that the German people as a whole were united by distinct "spiritual" qualities. Nevertheless, Nazi eugenics policies continued to favor Nordics over Alpines and other racial groups, particularly during World War II, when decisions were being made about the incorporation of conquered peoples into the Reich.

In 1942, Hitler made the following statement in private:

I shall have no peace of mind until I have planted a seed of Nordic blood wherever the population stands in need of regeneration. If at the time of the migrations, while the great racial currents were exercising their influence, our people received so varied a share of attributes, these latter blossomed to their full value only because of the presence of the Nordic racial nucleus.

In his "table talk", Hitler described how the presence of German and English soldiers in the combat areas which he had served in during World War I had, in his view, improved the quality of the young people who he saw there in 1940, in a "Nordicizing process, the results of which are today [according to Hitler] incontestable". He also said he observed the same process at work in the area of his mountain home near Berchtesgaden, which he described as having, when he first came there, a mongrel population, the quality of which was much improved by the presence of his SS Bodyguard Regiment, which was responsible for "the numbers of strong and healthy children running around the area". Hitler went on to say that "[This] shows that elite troops should really be sent wherever the composition of the people is poor, in order to improve it." Indeed, Hitler and Himmler planned to use the SS—a racial elite chosen on the basis of "pure" Nordic qualities—as the basis for the racial "regeneration" of Europe following the final victory of Nazism.

Addressing officers of the SS-Leibstandarte "Adolf Hitler", Himmler stated:

The ultimate aim for those 11 years during which I have been the Reichsfuehrer SS has been invariably the same: to create an order of good blood which is able to serve Germany; which unfailingly and without sparing itself can be made use of because the greatest losses can do no harm to the vitality of this order, the vitality of these men, because they will always be replaced; to create an order which will spread the idea of Nordic blood so far that we will attract all Nordic blood in the world, take away the blood from our adversaries, absorb it so that never again, looking at it from the viewpoint of grand policy, Nordic blood, in great quantities and to an extent worth mentioning, will fight against us.

== Italy ==
In Italy, the influence of Nordicism had a divisive effect in which the influence resulted in Northern Italians who regarded themselves to have Nordic racial heritage considered themselves a civilised people while negatively regarding Southern Italians as non-Nordic and therefore biologically inferior. Nordicism was controversial in Italy because of common Nordicist perceptions of Mediterranean people, and especially Southern Italians, being racially degenerate. The distinction between a superior Northern Italy and a degenerate and an inferior Southern Italy was promoted by Carlo Formichi, the vice-president of the Italian Academy, who in 1921 said that Italy needed "a great revolution ..., a return to the genius of the noble Aryan race, which is after all our race, but that has been overcome by the Semitic civilisation and mentality". At least some of the stereotypes about Southern Italians were created by Cesare Lombroso, an Italian criminologist and anthropologist. For his controversial theories, Lombroso was expelled from the Italian Society of Anthropology and Ethnology in 1882. The Lombrosian doctrine is currently considered pseudoscientific.

=== Fascist Nordicism ===
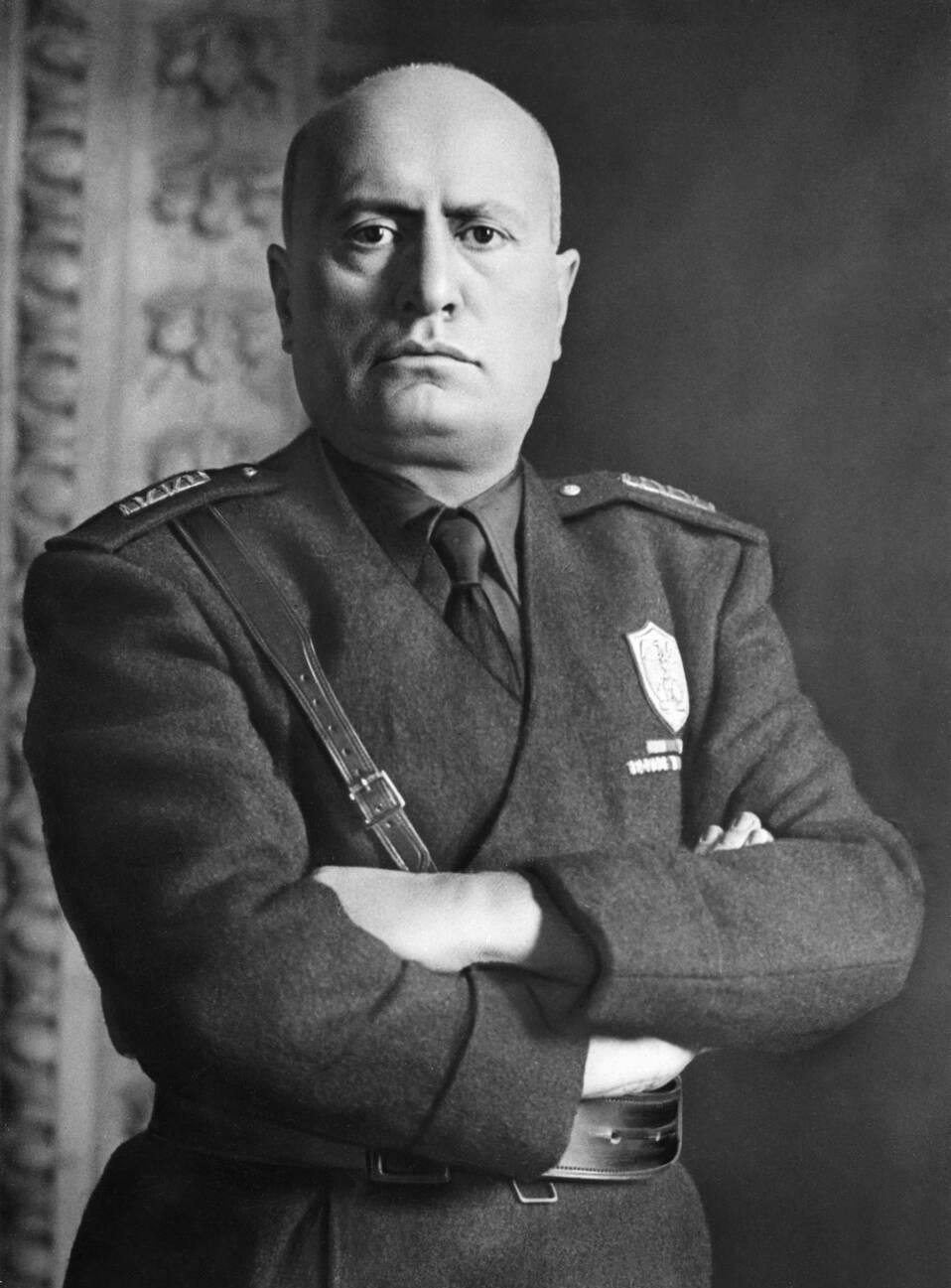
Benito Mussolini. Initially, Mussolini was a strong proponent of Mediterraneanism; however, in response to pro-Nordicist Nazism's rising influence, Mussolini promoted Aryanism and argued that Italians have a Nordic-Mediterranean heritage.

Italian Fascism's stance towards Nordicism changed from initially being hostile to later being favorable.

Italian Fascism strongly rejected the common Nordicist conception of the Aryan race that idealized "pure" Aryans as having certain physical traits that were considered Nordic, such as fair skin, blond hair and light eyes- traits which most Italians do not have. The antipathy by Mussolini and other Italian Fascists to Nordicism was over the existence of what they viewed as the Mediterranean inferiority complex that they claimed had been instilled into Mediterraneans by the propagation of such theories by German and British Nordicists, who viewed Mediterranean peoples as racially degenerate, and thus, in their view, inferior. However, traditional Nordicist claims of Mediterraneans being degenerate due to having a darker colour of skin than Nordics had long been rebuked in anthropology through the depigmentation theory that claimed that lighter skinned peoples had been dipigmented from a darker skin. This theory has since become a widely accepted view in anthropology. Anthropologist Carleton S. Coon in his work The races of Europe (1939) subscribed to depigmentation theory that claimed that Nordic race's light-coloured skin was the result of depigmentation from their ancestors of the Mediterranean race. Mussolini refused to allow Italy to return again to this inferiority complex, initially rejecting Nordicism.

In the early 1930s, in response to the Nazi Party's rise to power in Germany, strong tensions which were caused by racial issues arose between the Fascists and the Nazis, because the Fascists did not agree with Hitler's emphasis on a Nordicist conception of the Aryan race. In 1934, after Austrian Nazis killed the Austrian Chancellor Engelbert Dollfuss, an ally of Italy, Mussolini became enraged and angrily denounced Nazism. Mussolini rebuked Nazism's Nordicism, claiming that the Nazis' belief in the existence of a common Nordic "Germanic race" was absurd, saying that "a Germanic race does not exist. ... We repeat. Does not exist. Scientists say so. Hitler says so." That Germans were not purely Nordic was indeed acknowledged by Nazi racial theorist Hans F. K. Günther in his book Rassenkunde des deutschen Volkes (1922) ("Racial Science of the German People"), where Günther recognized the Germans as being composed of five Aryan racial subtypes: Nordic, Mediterranean, Dinaric, Alpine and East Baltic, while asserting that the Nordics were the highest in a racial hierarchy of the five subtypes.

By 1936, the tensions which existed between Fascist Italy and Nazi Germany lessened, and relations between the two nations became more amicable. In 1936, Mussolini decided to launch a racial programme in Italy, and he was interested in the racial studies which were being conducted by Giulio Cogni. Cogni was a Nordicist, but he did not equate Nordic identity with Germanic identity as was commonly done by German Nordicists. Cogni traveled to Germany, was impressed by Nazi racial theories, and sought to implement his own version of these racial theories in Italy. On 11 September 1936, Cogni sent Mussolini a copy of his newly published book Il Razzismo (1936). Cogni claimed that a racial affinity existed between the Mediterranean and Nordic racial subtypes of the Aryan race, and he also claimed that the intermixing of Nordic Aryans and Mediterranean Aryans in Italy produced a superior synthesis of Aryan Italians. Cogni addressed the issue of the racial differences which existed between northern and southern Italians, declaring that southern Italians were mixed between Aryan and non-Aryan races. He claimed that this mixture was most likely caused by infiltrations by Asiatic peoples in Roman times and later Arab invasions. As such, Cogni viewed Southern Italian Mediterraneans as being polluted with orientalizing tendencies. He would later change his view and claim that Nordics and Southern Italians were closely related to each other, both racially and spiritually, and that the two ethnic groups were closely related to each other. He believed that Nordics and Italians were generally responsible for inventing what are considered the best features of European civilization. Initially Mussolini was not impressed with Cogni's work; however, Cogni's ideas entered into the official Fascist racial policy several years later.

In 1938, Mussolini started to fear that the Mediterranean inferiority complex would return to Italian society if Italian Fascism did not recognize the Nordic heritage of Italians. Therefore, in the summer of 1938, the Fascist government officially recognized Italians as having a Nordic heritage and it also recognized Italians as being of Nordic-Mediterranean descent. At a meeting of PNF members in June 1938, Mussolini identified himself as having Nordic racial heritage and he declared that the previous policy which focused on Mediterraneanism would be replaced with a focus on Aryanism. In July 1938, Mussolini declared that Italians had a strong Nordic heritage, particularly through the heritage of the Germanic Lombards who settled in the area of Italy after the collapse of the Western Roman Empire, and he also claimed that the intermixing of Mediterranean Romans with the Germanic Lombards was the last significant act of racial mixing that occurred in Italy, because no racial mixing had occurred since then.

== Post-Nazi re-evaluation and decline of Nordicism ==
Even before the rise of Nazism, Grant's concept of "race" lost some favour in the US in the polarising political climate after World War I, including the Great Migration and the Great Depression. By the 1930s, criticism of the Nordicist model was growing in Britain and America. The British historian Arnold J. Toynbee in A Study of History (1934) argued that the most dynamic civilisations have arisen from racially mixed cultures. This required the abandonment of Grant's gradations of "white" in favour of the "One-drop rule"—which was embraced by white supremacists and black leaders alike. Among the latter were Marcus Garvey, and, in part, W. E. B. Du Bois, at least in his later thought.

With the rise of Nazism many critics pointed to the flaws in the theory, repeating the arguments made by Sergi and others that the evidence of ancient Nordic achievement is thin when set against the civilizations of the Mediterranean and elsewhere. The equation of Nordic and Aryan identity was also widely criticized.

In 1936 M. W. Fodor, writing in The Nation, argued that racialized Germanic nationalism arose from an inferiority complex:

No race has suffered so much from an inferiority complex as has the German. National Socialism was a kind of Coué method of converting the inferiority complex, at least temporarily, into a feeling of superiority.

Some Lombard nationalists took it up in Italy, but even after the establishment of Benito Mussolini's fascist government racial theories were not prominent. Mussolini stated, "Nothing will ever make me believe that biologically pure races can be shown to exist."

After World War II, the categorisation of peoples into "superior" and "inferior" groups fell even further out of political and scientific favour, eventually leading to the characterisation of such theories as scientific racism. The tripartite subdivision of "Caucasians" into Nordic, Alpine and Mediterranean groups persisted among some scientists into the 1960s, notably in Carleton Coon's book The Origin of Races (1962).

Already race academics such as A. James Gregor were heavily criticising Nordicism. In 1961 Gregor called it a "philosophy of despair", on the grounds that its obsession with purity doomed it to ultimate pessimism and isolationism.

As late as 1977 the Swedish author Bertil Lundman wrote a book The Races and Peoples of Europe mentioning a "Nordid Race". The development of the Kurgan theory of Indo-European origins challenged the Nordicist equation of Aryan and Nordic identity, since it placed the earliest Indo-European speakers around central Asia and/or far-eastern Europe (although according to the Kurgan hypothesis some Proto-Indo-Europeans did eventually migrate into Central and Northern Europe and become the ancestors of the Nordic peoples.)

The original German term used by Ripley, "Theodiscus", which is translated into English as Teutonic, has fallen out of favour amongst German-speaking scholars, and is restricted to a somewhat ironical usage similar to the archaic teutsch, if used at all. While the term is still present in English, which has retained it in some contexts as a translation of the traditional Latin Teutonicus (most notably the aforementioned Teutonic Order), it should not be translated into German as "Teutonisch" except when referring to the historical Teutones.

== See also ==
- Apartheid
- Aryan certificate
- Basking in reflected glory
- Borealism
- Know-Nothing movement
- Ku Klux Klan
- Martial races theory
- Nazi racial theories
- Nordic Israelism
- Renordification
- UNESCO statements on race
- White nationalism
- White supremacy
- Wotansvolk
