= Master race =

Nazi concept of Aryan superiority

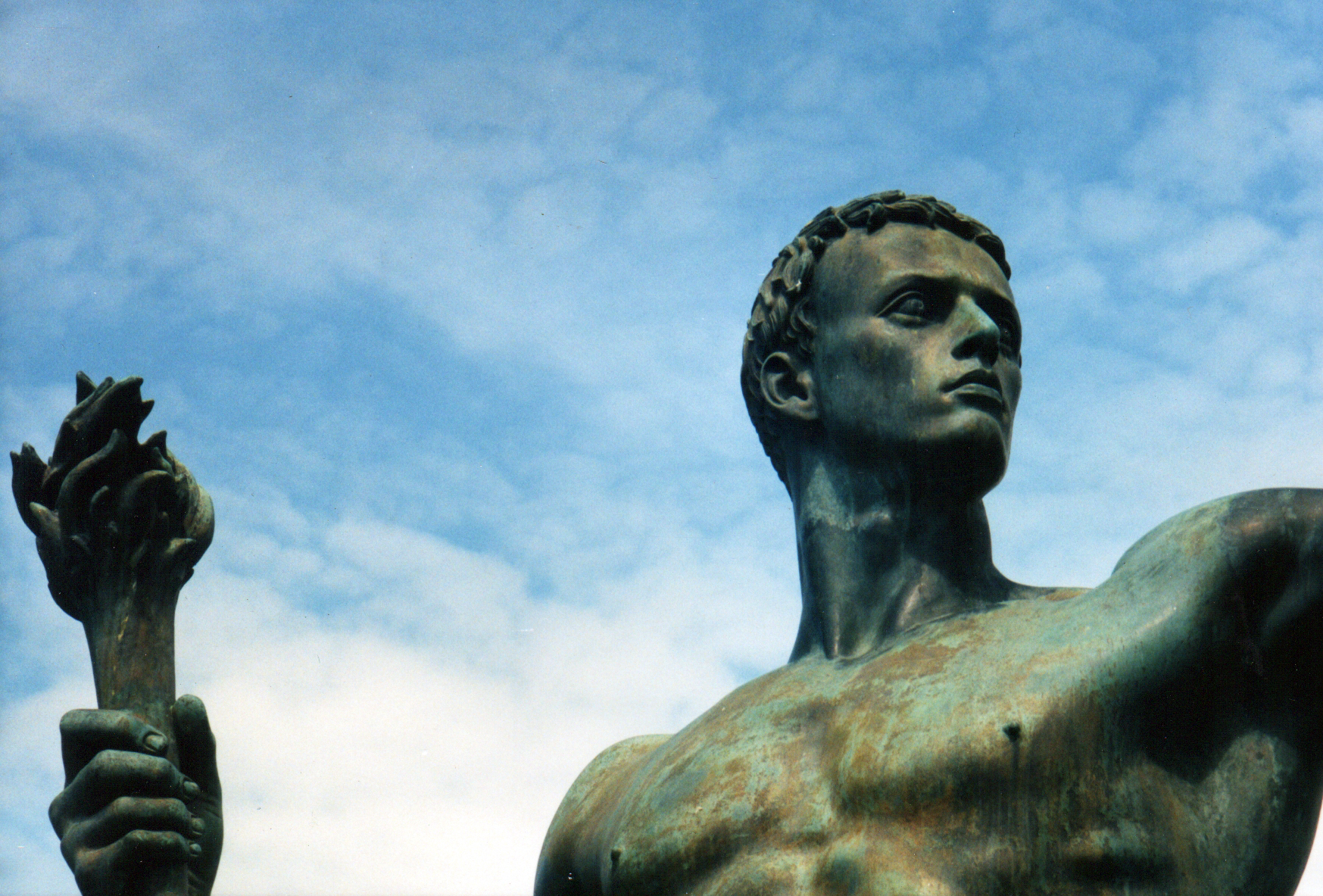
Arno Breker's 1939 neoclassical sculpture Die Partei (The Party), which flanked one of the entrances to the Albert Speer-designed Reich Chancellery in Berlin. The sculpture emphasizes what the Nazis considered to be desirable Nordic racial characteristics.

The master race (German: Herrenrasse [ˈhɛʁənˌʁasə]) is a pseudoscientific concept in Nazi ideology, in which the putative Aryan race is deemed the pinnacle of human racial hierarchy. Members were referred to as master humans (Herrenmenschen [ˈhɛʁənˌmɛnʃn̩]).

The Nazi theorist Alfred Rosenberg believed that the "Nordic race" was descended from Proto-Indo-Europeans, who he thought had pre-historically dwelt on the North German Plain and it was not impossible that the Nordic race ultimately originated on the lost island of Atlantis. The Nazis declared that the Aryans were superior to all other races, and believed they were entitled to expand territorially. The actual policy that was implemented by the Nazis resulted in the Aryan certificate. This document, which was required by law for all citizens of the Reich, was the "Lesser Aryan certificate" (Kleiner Ariernachweis) and could be obtained through an Ahnenpass, which required the owner to trace their lineage through baptism, birth certificates, or certified proof thereof that all grandparents were of "Aryan descent".

The Slavs, Roma, and Jews were defined as being racially inferior and non-Aryan "Untermenschen", and were thus considered a danger to the Aryan or Germanic master race. According to the Nazi secret Hunger Plan and Generalplan Ost, the Slavic population was to be removed from Central Europe through expulsion, enslavement, starvation, and extermination, except for a small percentage who were deemed to be non-Slavic descendants of Germanic settlers, and thus suitable for Germanisation.

== Historical background ==
The 18th century saw the first scientific attempts to establish a racial divide between "masters" and "slaves", or the belief that a nation's ruling class is biologically superior to its ruled subjects. In his book History of the Ancient Government of France, published posthumously in 1727, Henri de Boulainvilliers attempted to prove that in France, the nobility represented the descendants of the old Frankish ruling class. In contrast, the majority of the population descended from the subject Gauls. As a result, two qualitatively different races faced off, and the only way to abolish the Franks' superiority was to destroy their civilization. Classical liberal theorists such as Volney and Sieyès refuted this theory by demonstrating that the French nobility was primarily composed of nouveaux riches from all over the country. Thus, the concept of a racially pure Frankish lineage was false.

In 1855, French count Arthur de Gobineau published his infamous work An Essay on the Inequality of the Human Races. Expanding upon Boulainvilliers' use of ethnography to defend the Ancien Régime against the Third Estate's claims, Gobineau divides the human species into three major groups: white, yellow and black, claiming that "history springs only from contact with the white races". He considers the Aryan race to be the pinnacle of human development, serving as the basis of all European aristocracies. However, inevitable miscegenation led to the "downfall of civilizations".

Gobineau's influence was minimal at first. In his letters to Alexis de Tocqueville, he complained that his book was getting little attention in France and was only having an impact in the United States. Despite his friendship with Gobineau, Tocqueville rejected the book, explaining that it was in accordance with the interests of slave owners in the Southern United States. However, in the 1880s, the book gained popularity in Germany thanks to Cosima Wagner's efforts. In 1899, Houston Stewart Chamberlain, a Germanophile Englishman and Cosima Wagner's son-in-law, published The Foundations of the Nineteenth Century. Expanding on Gobineau's earlier theories, he argued that the Teutonic peoples had a profound influence on Western civilization. Chamberlain classified all European peoples, including Germans, Celts, Slavs, Greeks, and Latins, as the "Aryan race", which was built on ancient Proto-Indo-European culture. He saw the Nordic or Teutonic peoples as the leaders of the Aryan race, and essentially all races.

The German philosopher Friedrich Nietzsche introduced the concept of Übermensch, which translates to "Overman" or "Superman". In his 1883 book Also Sprach Zarathustra: Ein Buch für Alle und Keinen (Thus Spoke Zarathustra: A Book for All and None), he proposed the idea of the Übermensch as a goal for humanity. However, Nietzsche never developed the concept based on race. Instead, the Übermensch "seems to be the ideal aim of spiritual development more than a biological goal".

By the late nineteenth and early twentieth centuries, it was believed that Indo-Europeans (generally referred to as Aryans) were the highest branch of humanity due to their technological advancement. This reasoning was simultaneously linked with Nordicism, which claimed that the "Nordic race" was the "purest" form of the Aryan race. Today, this view is regarded as a form of scientific racism. It contradicts the belief in racial equality by advocating the view that one race is superior to all other races.

=== Eugenics ===
Eugenics came to play a prominent role in this racial thought as a way to improve and maintain the purity of the Aryan master race. Many thinkers in the 1910s, 1920s, and 1930s adhered to Eugenics, such as Margaret Sanger, Marie Stopes, H. G. Wells, Woodrow Wilson, Theodore Roosevelt, Madison Grant, Émile Zola, George Bernard Shaw, John Maynard Keynes, John Harvey Kellogg, Linus Pauling, and Sidney Webb.

In 1908, the Louisiana State Fair hosted the first "Better Babies" competition. Babies were judged based on livestock standards such as height, weight, unblemished skin, well-formed fingers, lack of excess fat, and cooperative behavior. The intent was to establish child-breeding health standards. Beginning in 1920, at the Kansas State Fair, a "Fitter Family" contest, sponsored by the American Eugenics Society's Committee on Popular Education, required family members to submit an "Abridged Records of Family Traits" and then undergo physical and psychological examinations to determine their "fitness", or eugenic health. Contests received letter grades, and the winners—almost always white and of Western and Northern European descent—were awarded trophies. Some years later, beginning in 1935, contestants in the Miss America contest were required to be "of the white race" and to submit a detailed account of their ancestry; those with backgrounds connected to the Pilgrims' arrival on the Mayflower or the American Revolutionary War had an advantage.

The Nazis took this concept to an extreme by establishing a program to systematically genetically enhance the Nordic Aryans themselves through a program of Nazi eugenics, based on the eugenics laws of the US state of California, to create a super race.

=== Hierarchy ===
The modern concept of the master race is generally derived from a 19th-century racial theory, which posited a hierarchy of races that was based on darkness of skin colour. This 19th-century concept was initially developed by Count Joseph Arthur De Gobineau. Gobineau's basic concept, as further refined and developed in Nazism, placed black Indigenous Australians and Equatorial Africans at the bottom of the hierarchy, while white Northern and Western Europeans (which consisted of Germans, Swedes, Icelanders, Norwegians, Danes, British, Irish, Dutch, Belgian and Northern French) were placed at its top; olive skinned white Southern Europeans (who consisted of Southern French, Portuguese, Spaniards, Italians, Romanians, and Greeks, i.e., those who were called the Mediterranean race, were regarded as another sub-race of the Caucasian race) and placed in its upper middle ranks; and the Semitic and Hamitic races (supposed sub-races of the Caucasian race) were placed in its lower-middle ranks (because the Jews were Semites, the Nazis believed their cleverness made them extremely dangerous – they had their own plan for Jewish world domination, a conspiracy which needed to be opposed by all thoughtful Aryans). Slavs such as Poles and Russians were not considered Aryans; and neither were the members of the Mongoloid race (including its offshoots such as Malayans, American Indians) and mixed-race people such as Eurasians, the bronze Mestizos, Mulattos, Afro-Asians, and Zambos were placed in its lower middle ranks. However, the Japanese were considered honorary Aryans.

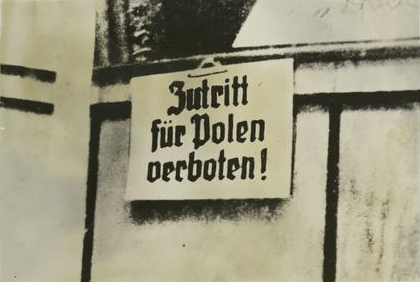
German warning in Nazi-occupied Poland 1939 – "No entrance for Poles!"

In their attempt to scientifically prove the racial inferiority of Slavs, German (and Austrian) racial scientists were forced to gloss over their findings which consistently proved that Early Slavs were dolicocephalic and fair haired, i.e., "Nordic", while the South Slavic "Dinaric" sub-race was often viewed favourable. Nazis used the term "Slavic race", and considered Slavs to be non-Aryan. The concept of a Slavic "Untermensch" accompanied their political goals, and it was particularly aimed at Poles and Russians. Germany's immediate goal was Drang nach Osten or "push into the east", which was the first phase in its ultimate plan to conquer Europe, and Ukraine's "chernozem" (black earth) soil was regarded as a particularly desirable zone for colonization by the "Herrenvolk" ("master people").

In relation to the Nazis' belief in racial purity, author and historian Lucy Dawidowicz wrote:

In the hierarchy of Nazi racism, the "Aryans" were the superior race, destined to rule the world after the destruction of their racial arch-foe, the Jews. The lesser races over whom the Germans would rule included the Slavs – Poles, Russians, Ukrainians. ... Hitler's racial policy with regard to the Slavs, to the extent that it was formulated, was "depopulation." The Slavs were to be prevented from procreating, except to provide the necessary continuing supply of slave laborers."

== "Master race" in the United States ==
=== Origins and context ===
In the United States, the concept of 'master race' arose within the context of master–slave race relations in the slavery-based society of historical America – particularly in the South in the mid-19th century. It was based upon both the experience of slavery and the pseudo-scientific justifications for racial slavery, but also on the relations between whites in the South and North, particularly during the American Civil War.

=== First occurrences ===
Benjamin W. Leigh, representing Virginia in the United States Senate, said in a speech of January 19, 1836:

There has been in Virginia as earnest a desire to abolish slavery as exists any where at this day. It commenced with the Revolution, and many of our ablest and most influential men were active in recommending it, and in devising plans for the accomplishment of it. The Legislature encouraged and facilitated emancipation by the owners, and many slaves were so emancipated. The leaning of the courts of justice was always in favorem libertatis. This disposition continued until the impracticability of effecting a general emancipation, without incalculable mischief to the master race, and danger of utter destruction to the other, and the evils consequent on partial emancipations, became too obvious to the Legislature, and to the great majority of the people, to be longer disregarded.

The Oxford English Dictionary records that William J. Grayson used the phrase "master race" in his poem The Hireling and the Slave (1855):

For these great ends hath Heaven’s supreme command
Brought the black savage from his native land,
Trains for each purpose his barbarian mind,
By slavery tamed, enlightened, and refined;
Instructs him, from a master-race, to draw
Wise modes of polity and forms of law,
Imbues his soul with faith, his heart with love,
Shapes all his life by dictates from above

where the phrase denotes the relation between the white masters and negro slaves.

By 1860 Virginian author George Fitzhugh was using the "challenging phrase 'master race', which soon came to mean considerably more than the ordinary master-slave relationship". Fitzhugh, along with a number of southern writers, used the term to differentiate Southerners from Northerners, based on the dichotomy that Southerners were supposedly descendants of Normans / Cavaliers whereas Northerners were descendants of Anglo-Saxons / Puritans.

=== Uses of the concept ===
In 1861, the Southern press bragged that Northern soldiers would "encounter a master race" and knowledge of this fact would cause Northern soldiers' "knees to tremble". The Richmond Whig in 1862 proclaimed that "the master race of this continent is found in the southern states", and in 1863 the Richmond Examiner stated that "there are slave races born to serve, master races born to govern".

In the works of John H. Van Evrie, a Northern supporter of the Confederacy, the term was interchangeable with white supremacy, notably in White Supremacy and Negro Subordination, Or, Negroes a Subordinate Race and (so-called) slavery its normal condition (1861). In Subgeneation: the theory of the normal relations of the races; an answer to miscegenation (1864) Van Evrie created the words "subgen" to describe what he considered to be the "inferior races" and "subgeneation" to describe the ‘normal’ relation of such inferior races to whites, something which he considered to be the "very corner-stone of democracy"; but these words never entered the dictionary.

The racial term Untermensch originates from the title of Klansman Lothrop Stoddard's 1922 book The Revolt Against Civilization: The Menace of the Under-man. It was later adopted by the Nazis from that book's German version Der Kulturumsturz: Die Drohung des Untermenschen (1925). An advocate of the U.S. immigration laws that favored Northern Europeans, Stoddard wrote primarily on the alleged dangers posed by "coloured" peoples to white civilization, with his most famous book The Rising Tide of Color Against White World-Supremacy in 1920. Alfred Rosenberg was the leading Nazi who attributed the concept of the East-European "under man" to Stoddard. As the Nazi Party's chief racial theorist, Rosenberg oversaw the construction of a human racial "ladder" that justified Hitler's racial and ethnic policies. Referring to Russian communists, Rosenbeg wrote in his Der Mythus des 20. Jahrhunderts (1930) that "this is the kind of human being that Lothrop Stoddard has called the 'under man.'" ["...den Lothrop Stoddard als 'Untermenschen' bezeichnete."]

== Nordicism ==
The origins of the Nazi version of the master race theory were in the 19th-century racial theories of Count Joseph Arthur De Gobineau, who argued that cultures degenerated when distinct races mixed. It was believed at this time that the peoples of Southern Europe were racially mixed with the non-European Moors from across the Mediterranean Sea, while the peoples of Northern Europe and Western Europe remained pure. Proponents of the Nordicism further argued that Nordic peoples had developed an innate toughness and determination due to the harsh, challenging climate in which they evolved.

The philosopher Arthur Schopenhauer was one of the earliest proponents of a theory presenting a hierarchical racial model of history, attributing civilisational primacy to the "white races" who gained their sensitivity and intelligence by refinement in the harsh north.

The highest civilisation and culture, apart from the Ancient Indians and Egyptians, are found exclusively among the white races; and even with many dark peoples, the ruling caste or race is fairer in colour than the rest and has, therefore, evidently immigrated, for example, the Brahmins, the Incas, and the rulers of the South Sea Islands. All this is because necessity is the mother of invention because those tribes that emigrated early to the north and there gradually became white, had to develop all their intellectual powers and invent and perfect all the arts in their struggle with need, want and misery, which in their many forms were brought about by the climate. This they had to do in order to make up for the parsimony of nature and out of it all came their high civilisation.

Despite this, he was adamantly against differing treatment of races, was fervently anti-slavery, supporting the abolitionist movement in the United States. He describes the treatment of "[our] innocent black brothers whom force and injustice have delivered into [the slave master's] devilish clutches" as "belonging to the blackest pages of mankind's criminal record".

Hans Frank, Hitler's personal lawyer, stated that Hitler carried a copy of Schopenhauer's book The World as Will and Representation with him wherever he went throughout World War I.

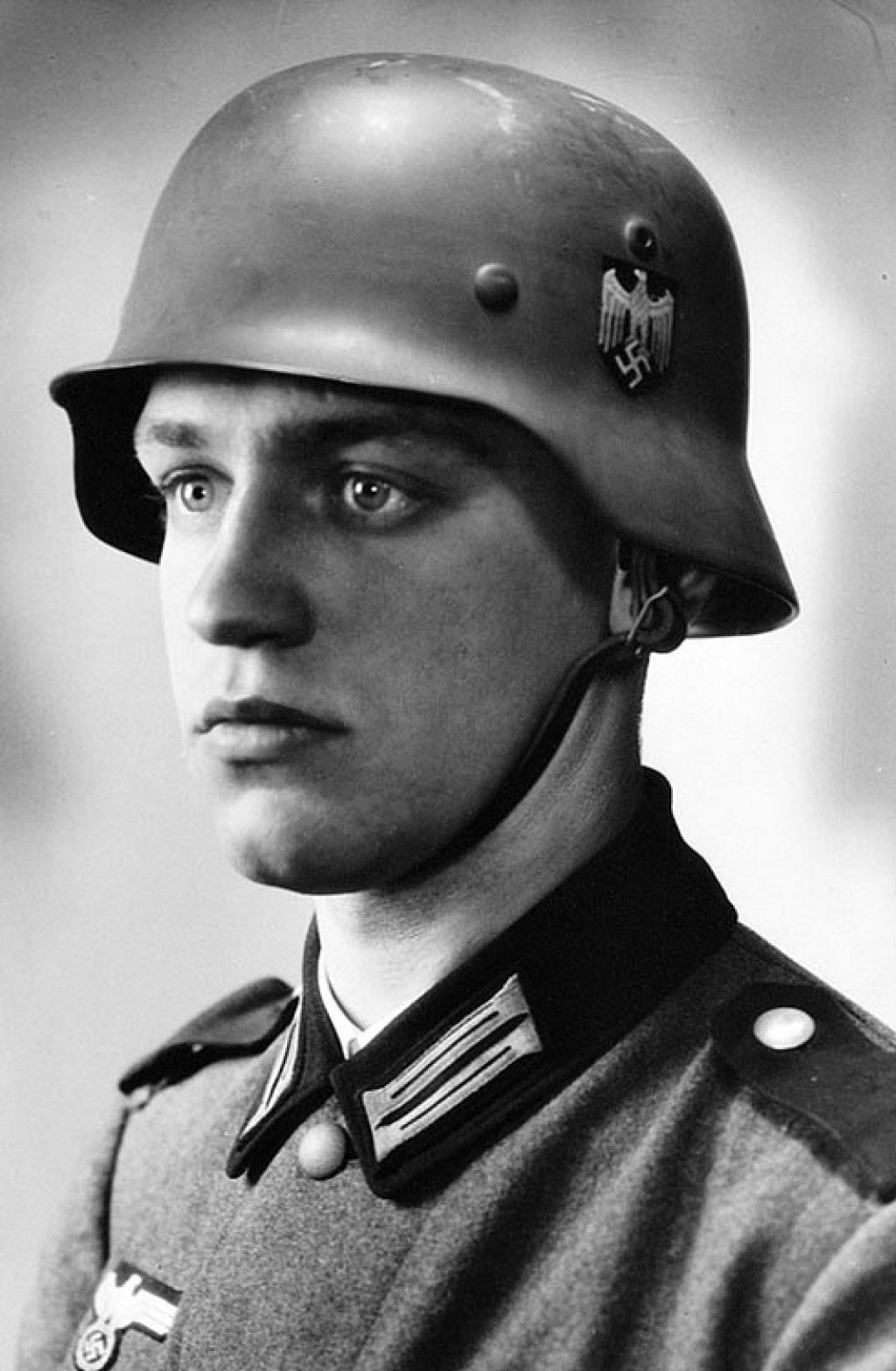
Werner Goldberg, who was part Jewish but blond and blue-eyed, was used in Nazi recruitment posters as "The Ideal German Soldier."

The postulated superiority of these people was said to make them born leaders, or a "master race". Other authors included Guido von List, his associate Lanz von Liebenfels, and the British-born German racial theorist Houston Stewart Chamberlain, all of whom felt that the white race in general, and Germanic peoples in particular, were superior to others, given the purification of both the white race and the German people from the other races which were "polluting" them, a new millenarian age of Aryan god-men would arrive.

Nazi policy stressed the superiority of the Germanic "Übermenschen" ("superhuman") Nordic race, a sub-race of the white Caucasian race European population defined by anthropometric models of racial difference. The Nordic race was said to comprise only of the Germanic peoples: Scandinavians and the rest of the Nordic countries (Norwegians, Swedes, Danes, Icelanders, and Faroese), ethnic Germans (including Austrians, Banat Swabians, as well as Sudeten, Baltic and Volga Germans), Alemannic Swiss, Liechtensteiners, Luxembourgers, the Dutch, Flemings, Afrikaners, Frisians and the English.

The Nazi racial theorist Hans F. K. Günther first defined "Nordic thought" in his programmatic book Der Nordische Gedanke unter den Deutschen ("The Nordic thought among the Germans"). The fact that Germans were not purely Nordic was acknowledged by Günther in his book Rassenkunde des deutschen Volkes ("Racial Science of the German People") from 1922, in which he described the German people as being made up of all five of his European racial categories: Nordic, Mediterranean, Dinaric, Alpine, and East Baltic. Most official Nazi comments on the Nordic race were based on Günther's works, and Alfred Rosenberg presented Günther with a medal for his work in anthropology.

Although the physical ideal of these racial theorists was typically the tall, fair-haired, and light-eyed Nordic individual, such theorists accepted the fact that a considerable variety of hair and eye colour existed within the racial categories they recognised. For example, Adolf Hitler and many Nazi officials had dark hair and were still considered members of the Aryan race under Nazi racial doctrine, because the determination of an individual's racial type depended on a preponderance of many characteristics in an individual rather than on just one defining feature.

Hitler and Himmler planned to use the SS as the basis for the racial "regeneration" of Europe following the final victory of Nazism. The SS was to be a racial elite chosen on the basis of "pure" Nordic qualities.

Giuseppe Sergi (1841–1936) was an Italian anthropologist of the early twentieth century, best known for his opposition to Nordicism in his books on the racial identity of ancient Mediterranean peoples. His concept of the Mediterranean race became important to the modelling of racial difference in the early twentieth century.

== Aryanism and Nazism ==
The term Aryan is derived from the Sanskrit word (ā́rya), which is derived from arya, the original Indo-Iranian autonym. Also, the word Iran (from Middle Persian Ērān, "the Ērs") is the Persian word for [the land/place of] the Aryans.

Following the ideas of Gobineau and others, the Nazi theorist Alfred Rosenberg determined that these people, who, he claimed, were originally from Atlantis, were a dynamic warrior people who dwelt in northern climates on the North German Plain in prehistoric times, from which they migrated southeast by riding their chariots, eventually reaching Ukraine, Iran, and then India. They were supposed to be the ancestors of the ancient Germanic tribes, who shared their warrior values. Rosenberg opposed Christianity because to him, it was an alien Semitic slave-morality which was inappropriate for the warrior Aryan master race and in its place, he supported a melange of aspects of Hindu Vedic and Zoroastrian teachings (both of these religions were organised by Aryans), along with pre-Christian European Odinistic paganism, which he also considered distinctively Aryan in character.

In Nazi Germany, the Nuremberg Race Laws of 1935 forbade sexual relations and marriage between an "Aryan" and a "non-Aryan" in order to maintain the purity of the Aryan race. Such relations became a punishable crime which was known as Rassenschande or "racial shame". The League of German Girls was particularly required to instruct girls to avoid Rassenschande because according to Nazism, maintaining racial purity was particularly important for young females. Aryans found guilty of this crime could face incarceration in a concentration camp, while non-Aryans could even face the death penalty. The Nazis recognized the Germanic people as the master race, and several policies were implemented in order to improve and maintain the Germanic-Nordic ubermenschen Aryan "master race," including the practice of eugenics. In order to eliminate "defective" citizens and rid the country of the intellectually disabled or those who were born with genetic deficiencies, as well as those who were deemed racially inferior, the T-4 Euthanasia Program was administered by Karl Brandt, one of Hitler's personal physicians. Additionally, a program of compulsory sterilisation was also implemented and as a result of it, forced operations were performed on hundreds of thousands of individuals. Many of these policies are generally seen as being related to what eventually became known as the Holocaust.

The Nazis also undertook measures to increase the number of Nordics in Germany. The Lebensborn program was only open to German women who fit the Nordic profile. During the Nazi occupation of Poland, the Nazis took young Nordic-looking Polish children who were classified as being descended from ethnic German settlers in order to determine whether or not they were "racially valuable". If that were the case, the young children were taken back to these Lebensborn houses so they could be raised as Germans.

In Nazi Germany, the Aryan certificate was an official document which certified that its owner was an Aryan. Aryan certificates could also be obtained by citizens of other countries. In its section which is titled Racial Tenet (Rassegrundsatz), the Aryan certificate states:

In line with national socialist thinking which does full justice to all other peoples, there is never the expression of superior or inferior, but alien racial admixtures.

For the "Greater Aryan certificate" Germans had to prove that as far back as January 1, 1800 "none of their paternal nor their maternal ancestors had Jewish or coloured blood". SS officers had to prove this reaching back to 1750.

During a speech he made in 1936, Nazi Propaganda Minister Joseph Goebbels said:

Today arises in young and old, high and low, poor and rich, the will that the German nation must again be a world people. All of us are convinced of it: we must participate in the ruling of the world. We must become a master race, and therefore we must educate our people to be a master race. This must begin with the smallest child, who must be educated in this master-ethic.

In 1943, Reichskommissar for Ukraine Erich Koch reminded Germans:

We are a master race, which must remember that the lowliest German worker is racially and biologically a thousand times more valuable than the population here.

== Yamato and Japan ==
During the Meiji era, a sense of superiority over other Asians existed in the Japanese society, with discrimination being enacted against racial minorities such as the Ryūkyū and Ainu peoples. In July 1943, promotion of Yamato racial superiority was further affirmed by the Japanese government with the publishing of An Investigation of Global Policy with the Yamato Race as Nucleus.

== Mediterranean race ==
The claim that the Mediterranean race was responsible for the most important of ancient Western civilisations was a problem for the promoters of Nordic superiority. According to Giuseppe Sergi, the Mediterranean race was the "greatest race of the world" and was singularly responsible for the most accomplished civilisations of ancient times, including those of Mesopotamia, Persia, Egypt, Greece, Phoenicia, Carthage, and Rome. The Mediterranean race was also a major influence to the outside world in the modern era: during the 16th century, Spain and Portugal established the first global empires in Western history, placing both nations on the highest level of political and economic powers in early modern Europe.

Charles Gabriel Seligman also stated that "it must, I think, be recognised that the Mediterranean race has actually more achievements to its credit than any other race, since it is responsible for by far the greater part of Mediterranean civilisation, certainly before 1000 BC (and probably much later), and so shaped not only the Aegean cultures, but those of Western as well as the greater part of Eastern Mediterranean lands, while the culture of their near relatives, the Hamitic pre-dynastic Egyptians, formed the basis of that of Egypt."

The Nazis explained this by claiming that the original Latins and Greeks were Indo-European Nordic tribes which had migrated into Italy and Greece, during the Iron Age. The Nazis also claimed that the Spanish and Portuguese Empires were examples of Nordic power since, at the time, their governments were run by the descendants of the Germanic Visigoths who invaded Spain and Portugal fifteen centuries earlier. However, they did admit that the masses of people who lived during the flowering of these four civilizations were Mediterranean. This led to Germans of all European races to be classified as Aryans.

== Cultural influences ==
Aryan master race ideology was common throughout the educated intellectual community and literate strata of the USA and Germany until the post-World War II era. Such theories were commonplace in early-20th century fantasy literature.

In the 1920s and 1930s, the original Buck Rogers stories and newspaper cartoons, Buck Rogers, in his adventures in the 25th century that takes place on Earth, depicts him fighting for Aryan-Americans from the liberated zone around Niagara, New York, against the Red Mongol Empire, a Chinese empire of the future which rules most of North America.

In the 1930s, both educational and storybooks for children in Germany taught their readers about the master race. In the Sun Koh science fiction series, the protagonist Koh says things like "My forefathers were Aryan", and in a story about Atlantis, he says, "If our Atlantis once again rises out of the sea, then we will get from there the blond, steel-hard men with the pure blood and will create with them the master race, which will finally rule the earth." The German writer Michael Ende, who was born in 1929 and grew up reading such books, wrote his classic novel Jim Button and Luke the Engine Driver in the 1950s, as a way of opposing the Nazi propaganda he was taught as a child. Frankfurter Allgemeine Zeitung writer Julia Voss wrote a book (Note: Voss' book was written as a doctoral dissertation.) on Jim Button, uncovering Ende's many references to Nazi symbols in that book. Voss shows how Ende upends the Nazi belief that Atlantis was the original home of the Aryan race by creating his own submerged city and making it rise, but not to restore Aryan master-race rule over the Earth, rather it becomes a multi-racial paradise with Jim Button, who is black and a descendant of the Magi Caspar, as its king.

In the Doctor Who series, the Doctor's frequent enemies, the Daleks, consider themselves a master race which must purge the universe of all other life forms; Terry Nation explicitly modeled them on the Nazis. In the 2009 special "The End of Time", when the Master transforms the entire human race into copies of himself, he claims that there is no human race, but only "the Master race".

== See also ==
- Chosen people
- Han chauvinism
- Herrenvolk democracy
- Ketuanan Melayu
- Master–slave morality
- Model minority

== Bibliography ==
- Evans, Richard J. (2008). The Third Reich at War. New York: Penguin. ISBN 978-0-14-311671-4.
- Longerich, Peter (2010). Holocaust: The Nazi Persecution and Murder of the Jews. Oxford; New York: Oxford University Press. ISBN 978-0-19-280436-5.
- Snyder, Timothy (2010). Bloodlands: Europe Between Hitler and Stalin. New York: Basic Books. ISBN 978-0-465-00239-9.
- Yenne, Bill (2010). Hitler's Master of the Dark Arts: Himmler's Black Knights and the Occult Origins of the SS. Minneapolis: Zenith. ISBN 978-0-7603-3778-3.
