= East Baltic =

East Baltic may refer to:

- the eastern Baltic region
- the East Baltic languages, a subset of the Baltic languages
- historically, in physical anthropology, the East Baltic race
