= French Israelism =

French nationalist belief

French Israelism (also called Franco-Israelism) is the French nationalist belief that people of Frankish descent in general, and the Merovingian dynasty in particular, are the direct lineal descendants of the Ten Lost Tribes of Israel, specifically, the descendants of the Tribe of Benjamin.

One of the earliest scholars who claimed that he could trace the ten lost tribes of Israel to France was the French Huguenot writer, Jacques Abbadie, who fled French Roman Catholic persecution and later settled in London, England. In his 1723 work, The Triumph Of Providence, he wrote:

God opened, as one might say, the tomb of the Ten Tribes by the conversion of the Northern Peoples… Certainly, unless the Ten Tribes have flown into the air, or been plunged into the center of the earth, we must look for them in the North, and in that part of the North, which at the time of Constantine was converted to the Christian faith… The Ten Tribes have since seen conversion into Christian nations, which they are, having thousands of God-fearing ministers in their midst, a people marked by physical possession of the Gospel as servants of God, and reunited with many of their brethren of Judah in the Christian church. This explanation allows us to see the historical fulfillment of the prophetic picture in the Gothic warriors, prepared for conquest, destined for empire, and ancestors of the tribes who inhabit this nation [France].

— Translation from the French by M.F. Bennett, The Servant People.

The claim became one of the foundational elements for the Priory of Sion hoax created by Pierre Plantard and Philippe de Chérisey in the 1960s, and it was fused with the notion of a Jesus bloodline and popularized in 1982 by the authors of the speculative nonfiction book The Holy Blood and the Holy Grail, and in 2003 by Dan Brown for his mystery thriller novel The Da Vinci Code.

== See also ==
- British Israelism
- Groups claiming affiliation with Israelites
- Nordic Israelism
