= Aryan Games =

Proposed replacement for the Olympic Games in Nazi Germany

The Aryan Games (German: Arische Spiele) were a proposed replacement for the Olympic Games in Nazi Germany. Proposed by Nazi sports organizer Carl Diem and subsequently adopted by Adolf Hitler, these multi-sport games were supposed to be housed permanently in Nuremberg at the planned "German Stadium", that had been designed by Nazi architect Albert Speer, but was never built.

The idea was originally entertained in 1939 by Carl Diem, chief organiser of the 1936 Summer Olympics in Berlin, who ahead of the 1936 Olympics was already noted for claiming that "Germanics may only be defeated by other Germanics," which turned out not to be the case. The idea was subsequently adopted by Hitler, who told Albert Speer that once the German Stadium was built, there would be no more Olympic Games, only the Aryan Games.

== See also ==
- Aryan race
