= La Difesa della Razza =

Political magazine in Italy (1938–1943)

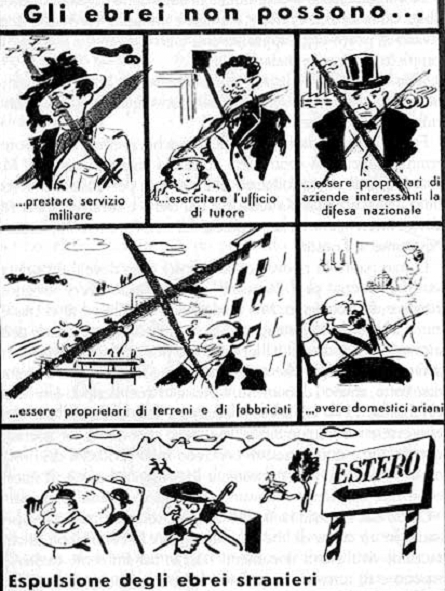
- A page from La Difesa della Razza
- Categories: Political magazine
- Frequency: Biweekly; Bimonthly
- Founded: 1938
- First issue: 5 August 1938
- Final issue: 20 June 1943
- Country: Italy
- Based in: Rome
- Language: Italian
- OCLC: 690960529

La Difesa della Razza (Italian: The Defence of Race) was a Fascist magazine which was published in Rome between 1938 and 1943 during the Fascist rule in Italy. Its subtitle was Scienza, Documentazione, Polemica (Italian: Science, Documentation, and Debate). It played a significant role in the implementation of the racial ideology following the invasion of Ethiopia and the introduction of the racial laws in 1938.

== History and profile ==
La Difesa della Razza was first published on 5 August 1938. It was established by the Office for the Racial Problems headed by Guido Landra. The founding director of the magazine was Giulio Cogni, but he left the post when he recognized that his ideas about races had been used by the Fascist leaders without making any reference to him. Cogni was replaced by Telesio Interlandi in the post. Giorgio Almirante served as its editorial secretary and was the assistant to Interlandi. The editorial board of the magazine included leading physicians and scientists. It came out biweekly, but later its frequency was switched to bimonthly.

La Difesa della Razza was financed by several public institutions, including the Ministry of Popular Culture, banks, industrial and insurance companies. Each issue of the magazine was delivered to schools and universities across Italy. It folded on 20 June 1943 after producing 118 issues.

== Ideology, content and contributors ==
The first issue of the magazine featured a manifesto, Manifesto della Razza, by the scholars which was the guiding principle of the racist ideology of Fascist Italy. Following the publication of this manifesto the approach of the state towards the Italian Jews and its colonial policies changed. The magazine described its goals in the first issue as follows:

We will popularize, with the help of scholars of various disciplines related to the problem, the fundamental concepts upon which the doctrine of Italian racism is based; and we will prove that science is on our side.

La Difesa della Razza often featured graphics, photographs, cartoons and photomontages accompanied by offensive and vulgar captions. Its headlines were mostly sensationalist. The magazine was a supporter of the pseudoscience, cultural racism and Italian primitivism rejecting the premises of European modernism. The most frequent topic covered in the magazine was about antisemitism. In May 1942 in the article by Giorgio Almirante blood was regarded as the sole evidence of Italianness which differentiated Italians from Jews and Black mixed race people. Both groups were depicted in a negative manner in the magazine through photographs. In 1942 and 1943 the magazine claimed that the British had a cruel attitude towards people living in its colonies.

Some of its contributors were Lino Businco, Luigi Castaldi, Elio Gasteiner, Guido Landra and Marcello Ricci who were scientific figures and published articles about biological racism. Guido Landra's articles were mostly concerned with hereditary diseases. Ferdinando Loffreda regularly wrote articles for the magazine in which he offered his antifeminist views.

=== Circulation ===
Shortly after its launch La Difesa della Razza sold 150,000 copies per issue. However, from November 1940 its circulation significantly decreased because of the start of World War II.
