= Hans F. K. Günther =

German writer, advocate of scientific racism and eugenicist (1891–1968)

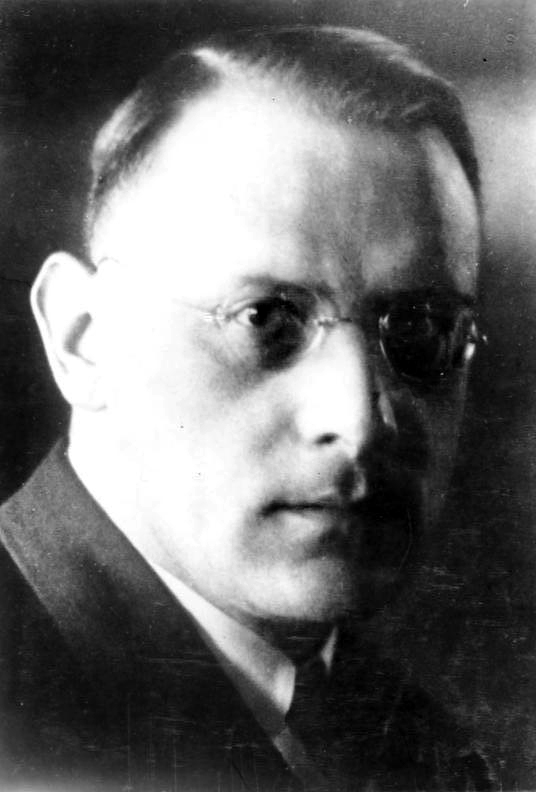
- Born: 16 February 1891; Freiburg, German Empire
- Died: 25 September 1968 (aged 77); Freiburg, West Germany
- Other names: "Rassengünther" ("Race Günther"), "Rassenpapst" ("Race Pope")
- Education: Albert Ludwigs University of Freiburg, University of Vienna
- Occupations: Physician, writer, eugenicist
- Employer(s): University of Jena, University of Berlin, University of Freiburg
- Known for: Nazi eugenics, scientific racism
- Political party: National Socialist German Workers Party (NSDAP)

Hans Friedrich Karl Günther (16 February 1891 – 25 September 1968), popularly known as Hans F. K. Günther, was a German writer, advocate of scientific racism and eugenicist in the Weimar Republic and Nazi Germany. He was also known as "Rassengünther" ("Race Günther") or "Rassenpapst" ("Race Pope"). He is considered to have been a major influence on Nazi racialist thought.

Günther taught at the universities of Jena, Berlin, and Freiburg, writing numerous books and essays on racial theory. Günther's Kleine Rassenkunde des deutschen Volkes ("Short Ethnology of the German People"), published in 1929, was a popular exposition of Nordicism. In May 1930, he was appointed to a new chair of racial theory at Jena. He joined the Nazi Party in 1932 as the only leading racial theorist to join the party before it assumed power in 1933.

== Life and career ==
Pages 34–5 of Short Ethnology of the German People. On the left page (right of two) there is an image of Joseph Stalin as representative of the "Near Eastern" race (vorderasiatisch) while on the right page (bottom two of four) there are two images of Jews from Germany and Austria respectively, described as "mainly Near Eastern" (vorwiegend vorderasiatisch).

Günther was the son of a musician. He studied comparative linguistics at Albert Ludwigs University in Freiburg, but also attended lectures on zoology and geography. In 1911, he spent a semester at the Sorbonne, Paris. He attained his doctorate in 1914, and in the same year enlisted in the infantry at the outbreak of World War I, but became sick and was hospitalized. He was declared unfit for combat, so to compensate for his inability to fight, he served with the Red Cross.

In 1919, after the end of the war, he started his writing career. He wrote a polemical work entitled Ritter, Tod und Teufel: Der heldische Gedanke ("The Knight, Death and the Devil: The Heroic Idea"), a reworking of the tradition of German völkisch-nationalist Romanticism into a form of "biological nationalism". Heinrich Himmler was very impressed by this book. In 1922 Günther studied at the University of Vienna while working in a museum in Dresden. In 1923 he moved to Scandinavia to live with his second wife, who was Norwegian. He received scientific awards from the University of Uppsala and the Swedish Institute for Race Biology, headed by Herman Lundborg. In Norway he met Vidkun Quisling. In May 1930 he was appointed to the University of Jena by Wilhelm Frick who had become the first NSDAP minister in a state government when he was appointed minister of education in the right-wing coalition government formed in Thuringen following an election in December 1929. In 1935 he became a professor at the University of Berlin, teaching race science, human biology and rural ethnography. From 1940 to 1945 he was professor at Albert Ludwigs University.

== Career in the Third Reich ==
He received several honors during the Third Reich, notably in 1935 he was declared "pride of the NSDAP" for his scientific work. In the same year he received the Rudolf Virchow plaque, and in 1940 the Goethe Medal for arts and science from Hitler. In March 1941, he was received as an honored guest for the opening conference of Alfred Rosenberg's Institute for Research on the Jewish Question. At the conference the obliteration of Jewish identity, or "people death" (Volkstod) of the Jews was discussed. Various proposals were made, including the "pauperization of European Jews and hard labor in massive camps in Poland". Günther's only recorded comment was that the meeting was boring.

After World War II, Günther was placed in French internment camps for three years until it was concluded that, though he was a part of the Nazi system, he was not an instigator of its criminal acts, making him less accountable for the consequences of his actions. The University of Freiburg came to his defense at his post-war trial. Nevertheless, even after Nazi Germany's fall, he did not revise his thinking, denying the Holocaust until his death. In 1951 he published the book How to choose a husband in which he listed good biological qualities to look for in marriage partners. He continued to argue that sterilization should remain a legal option, and played down the mandatory sterilization used in Nazi Germany. Another eugenics book was published in 1959 in which he argued that unintelligent people reproduce too numerously in Europe, and the only solution was state-sponsored family planning.

== Racial theories ==
Günther's theories arose from the Nordicist ideology prevalent at the time. Eugen Fischer, the professor of anthropology in Freiburg, was an influential proponent of these ideas and had lectured at Albert Ludwigs University when Günther studied there.

Günther wrote that a race could be identified in the following manner.

A race shows itself in a human group which is marked off from every other human group through its own proper combination of bodily and mental characteristics, and in turn produces only its like.

This definition of "race" was used in Nazi propaganda.

Günther in his writings was quick to mark out the distinction between "race" and "Volk". He acknowledged that both the Germans and Jews were not "races" in the strictest sense of the word but thought that it would cause no harm to refer to the latter as such in non-scientific popular racial works. Similarly, he rejected the usage of "Aryan" and "Semitic" as racial terms (he argued they were only linguistic terms) and stated that regarding them as such would cause more problems in distinguishing between Germans and Jews.

Günther described in his works, for instance in Rassenkunde des jüdischen Volkes ("Ethnology of the Jewish people"), that Jews belonged predominantly to the "Near Eastern race" (Vorderasiatische Rasse, more commonly known as the "Armenoid race"). He thought that Jews had become so racially mixed that they could possibly be regarded as a "race of the second order". He described Ashkenazi Jews as being mixed of Near Eastern, Oriental, East Baltic, Inner-Asian, Nordic, Hamite and Negro, and Sephardi Jews as being mixed of Oriental, Near Eastern, Mediterranean, Hamite, Nordic, and Negro. He believed that Jews had physical characteristics different to Europeans.

In his 1927 book The Racial Elements of European History, Günther outlined the differences between racial and linguistic definitions:

We find, in general, the most confused notions as to how the European peoples are composed of various races. We often hear, for example, a 'white race' or a 'Caucasian race' spoken of, to which the Europeans are said to belong. But probably, were he asked, no one could tell us what its bodily characteristics are. It is, or should be, quite clear that a 'race' must be embodied in a group of human beings each of whom presents the same physical and mental picture. Physical and mental differences, however, are very great, not only within Europe (often called the home of the 'white' or 'Caucasian' race) and within each of the countries in it, but even within some small district in one of the latter. There is, therefore, no 'German race,' or 'Russian race,' or 'Spanish race.' The terms 'nation' and 'race' must be kept apart.

People may be heard speaking of a 'Germanic,' a 'Latin,' and a 'Slav' race; but it is at once seen that in those lands where Germanic, Romance, or Slav tongues are spoken there is the same bewildering variety in the outward appearance of their peoples, and never any such uniformity as suggests a race.

We see, therefore, that the human groups in question – the 'Germans,' the 'Latins,' and the 'Slavs' – form a linguistical, not a racial combination.

The following consideration will probably be enough to keep racial and linguistical grouping distinct from one another. Is a North American negro – a man, that is, speaking American English, a Germanic tongue, as his own – is he a German, taking this term in its wider meaning? The usual answer would be: No; for a German is tall, fair, and light-eyed. But now a fresh perplexity comes in: In Scotland are found many tall, fair, light-eyed men and women, speaking Keltic. Are there, then, Kelts who look like 'Germans'? It is from Kelts (according to a still prevalent belief in south Germany) that the dark, short people of Germany come. Many of the ancient Greeks and Romans are described as like Germans. Fair, light-eyed men and women are not seldom met with in the Caucasus. There are Italians of 'Germanic' appearance. I have taken the anthropometrical measurements of a Spaniard with this appearance. On the other hand, there are very many Germans, men belonging, that is, to a people speaking a Germanic tongue, who have no Germanic appearance whatever.

Günther divided the European populations into six races, the "Nordic" ("Nordische"), "Phalic" or "Phalian" ("Fälische"), "Eastern" ("Ostische"), "Western" ("Westische"), "Dinaric" ("Dinarische") and "East Baltic" ("Ostbaltische") race. "Western" and "Eastern" were, in practice, alternatives for the more widely used terms "Mediterranean" and "Alpine". The "Phalic" race was a minor category regarded as a sub-type of the Nordic race, and was dropped in many of his writings.

Günther in his book Rassenkunde des deutschen Volkes ("Racial Science of the German People") categorized Germans as belonging to the Nordic, Mediterranean, Dinaric, Alpine and East Baltic races. In the book, he argued for Germans to avoid race mixing.

Opposed to the Nordics were the Jews, who were "a thing of ferment and disturbance, a wedge driven by Asia into the European structure." Günther argued that the Nordic peoples should unite to secure their dominance.

Although Günther seemed to admire Mediterraneans and Dinarics, as well as the highly praised Nordics, the East Baltic race was considered inferior in nearly every instance Günther mentioned it in his book, The Racial Elements of European History.

Günther believed Slavic people to be of an "Eastern race" separate from Germany and Nordics and warned about mixing "German blood" with Slavic one.

Among Günther's disciples was Bruno Beger who, after the 1938–39 German expedition to Tibet, concluded that the Tibetan peoples had characteristics that placed them between the Nordic and Mongol races, uniquely among other East Asians.

== Influence on Adolf Hitler ==
Timothy Ryback, who examined the books retrieved from Adolf Hitler's private collection, notes that Hitler owned six books by Günther, four of which were different editions of Rassenkunde des deutschen Volkes ("Racial Science of the German People"). These were given to him by Günther's publisher Julius Lehmann, who inscribed three of them. The earliest, a third edition from 1923, is for "the successful champion of German racial thinking", while the 1928 edition bears a "Christmas greeting". The 1933 sixteenth edition, with a detailed appendix on European Jews, shows signs of extended, sustained use. Lehmann dedicated it to "the trailblazer of racial thinking". Ryback notes that Hitler included Günther's book on a list of books recommended for all Nazis to read. When newly appointed Thuringian Education Minister Wilhelm Frick, the first NSDAP minister in government, appointed Günther to a chair in "Social Anthropology" at the University of Jena in 1930 (for which Jena professors considered him unqualified), Adolf Hitler and Hermann Göring demonstratively attended his inaugural lecture.

== Bibliography ==
- Christopher Hale, Himmler's Crusade: the True Story of the 1938 Nazi Expedition into Tibet. Bantam, 2004 ISBN 978-0-553-81445-3.
- Steinweis, Alan E (2008) [2006]. Studying the Jew: Scholarly Antisemitism in Nazi Germany. Harvard University Press. ISBN 978-0674027619.
- Yeomans, Rory; Wendt, Anton Weiss (2013). Racial Science in Hitler's New Europe, 1938-1945. U of Nebraska Press. ISBN 978-0-8032-4605-8.
