= Rassenkunde des deutschen Volkes =

1922 Nazi book

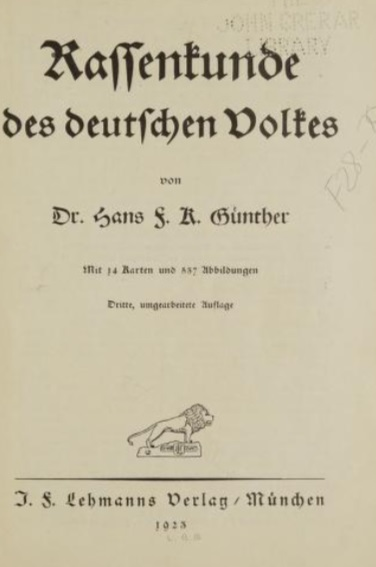
- Author: Hans Günther
- Language: German
- Genre: Politics
- Publication date: 1922
- Publication place: Germany
- ISBN: 978-1389793523

Rassenkunde des deutschen Volkes (English: Racial Science of the German People), is a book written by German race researcher and Nazi Party member Hans Günther and published in 1922. The book strongly influenced the racial policy of the Nazi Party; Adolf Hitler was so impressed by the work that he made it the basis of his eugenics policy. The book had gone through six editions by 1926, and by 1945, more than half a million copies had been sold in Germany.

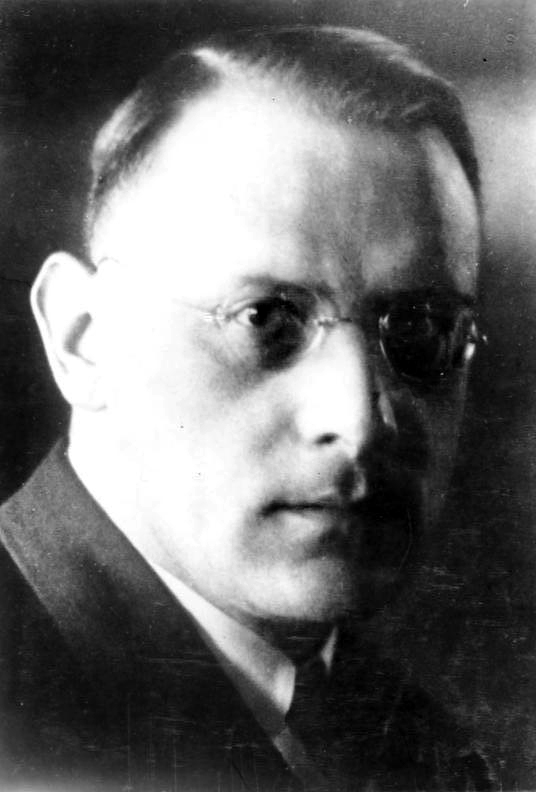
Hans Günther, author of the book

In the book, Günther recognizes the Germans as being composed of five racial subtypes: Nordic, Mediterranean, Alpine, East Baltic, and Dinaric, viewing Nordics as being at the top of the racial hierarchy. He defines each racial subtype according to general physical appearance and their psychological qualities including their "racial soul" - referring to their emotional traits and religious beliefs, and provides detailed information on their hair color, eye color and skin color, and facial structure. He provides photographs of Germans identified as Nordic in places like Baden, Stuttgart, Salzburg, and Schwaben, and photographs of Germans he identifies as belonging to the Alpine and Mediterranean types, especially in Vorarlberg, Bavaria, and the Black Forest region of Baden.
