= The Myth of the Twentieth Century =

1930 book by Alfred Rosenberg about Nazi ideology

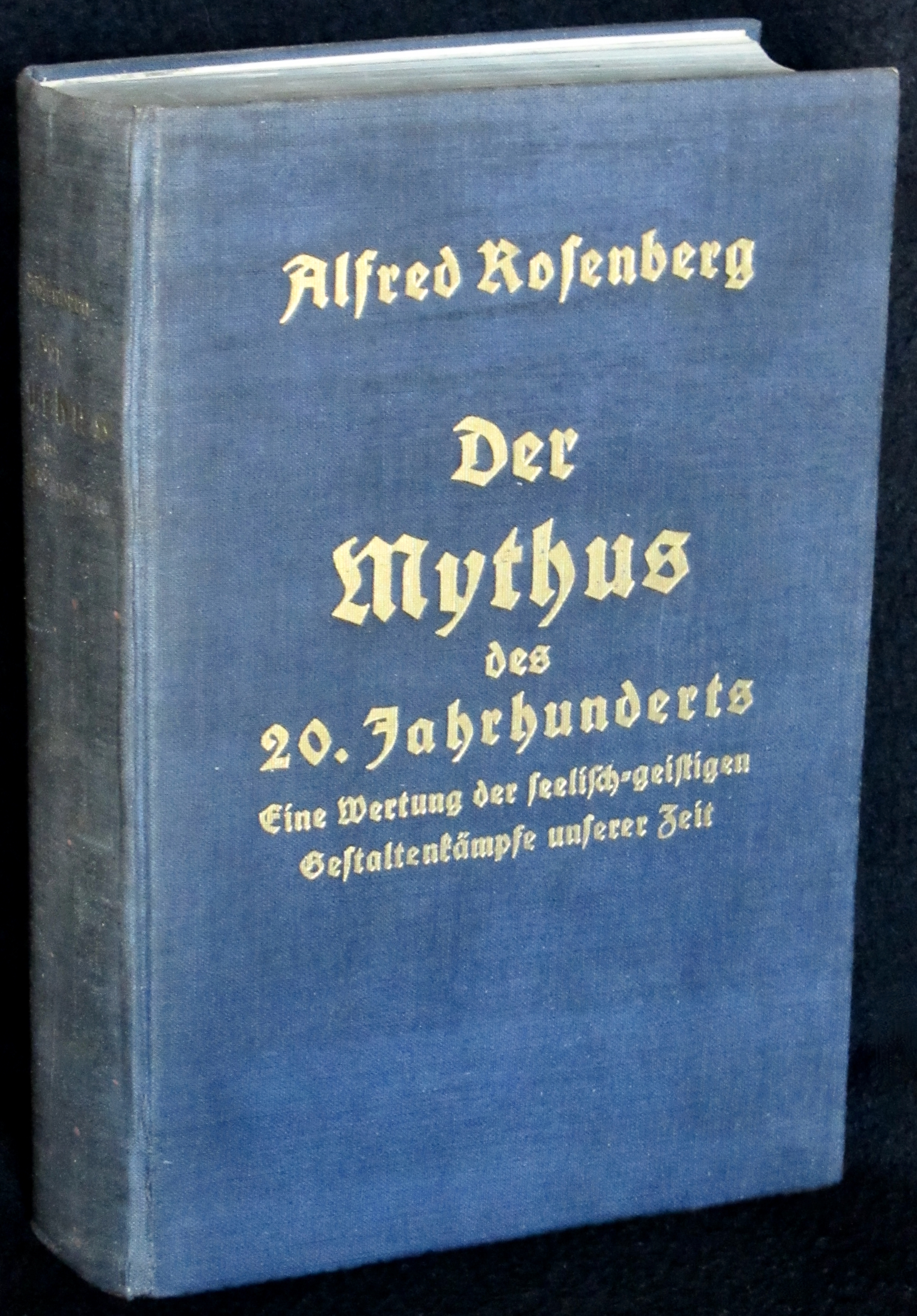
- First edition
- Author: Alfred Rosenberg
- Original title: Der Mythus des 20. Jahrhunderts
- Translator: Vivian Bird
- Language: German
- Subject: Scientific racism
- Published: 1930
- Publisher: Hoheneichen-Verlag
- Publication place: Munich
- English publication date: 1982
- Dewey Decimal: 901
- LC Class: CB425 .R73

The Myth of the Twentieth Century: An Evaluation of the Spiritual-Intellectual Confrontations of Our Age (German: Der Mythus des 20. Jahrhunderts: Eine Wertung der seelisch-geistigen Gestaltenkämpfe unserer Zeit) is an influential pseudo-scientific and pseudo-historical book by Alfred Rosenberg, a Nazi theorist who was one of the principal ideologues of the Nazi Party and editor of the party newspaper, Völkischer Beobachter.

In the book, Rosenberg contends that the Aryan race is the originator of ancient civilizations which later declined and fell due to inter-marriage with "lesser races". Holding what he considers Aryan civilizations to be the pinnacle of humanity, he blames Jewish influences for moral and social degradation, and holds that the State must ensure that "higher" races must rule over the "lower" races and not interbreed with them.

Published in 1930, the book sold more than one million copies by 1944 thanks to Nazi support. Hitler awarded a State Prize for Art and Science to Rosenberg for the book in 1937. The document accompanying the prize "praises Rosenberg as a 'person who has, in a scientific and penetrating manner, laid the firm foundation for an understanding of the ideological bases of National Socialism'". The content of the book is a mix of racist pseudo-science and mysticism which makes the claim that the "Nordic race" originated in Atlantis, but explicitly stated the Atlantis he was speaking of was not the submerged continent but a placeholder word for a theorized homeland of the Aryans, and that their nobility justified the enslavement and even mass murder of non-Aryan races.

Some members of the Nazi leadership found some of this material embarrassing, but it was also publicly praised, often by the same Nazi leaders who disparaged the work in private.

== Rosenberg's influences ==
Rosenberg followed a long line of European racialist authors, including Arthur de Gobineau (author of An Essay on the Inequality of the Human Races) but his most important "source" was the British philosopher and scientific racist Houston Stewart Chamberlain. Rosenberg conceived of his book as a sequel to Chamberlain's 1899 book The Foundations of the Nineteenth Century.

Other influences included a dubious reading of Friedrich Nietzsche, Richard Wagner's Holy Grail romanticism (Chamberlain was Wagner's son-in-law), Haeckelian mystical vitalism, the medieval German philosopher Meister Eckhart and the heirs of his mysticism and Nordicist Aryanism in general..

"Racism substituted myth for reality; and the world that it created with its stereotypes, virtues and vices, was a fairytale world, which dangled a utopia before the eyes of those who longed for a way out of the confusion of modernity and the rush of time. It made the sun stand still and abolished change. All evil was blamed on the restless inferior races who lacked appreciation of the settled order of things."

— George L. Mosse, Toward the Final Solution: A History of European Racism (1978)

== Influence ==
Johannes Steizinger writes "Rosenberg clearly played a major role in the establishment of Nazi ideology" and that "Ideology is regarded as a necessary, but not sufficient cause for participation in genocide"

During the Nuremberg Trials, Justice Robert H. Jackson referred to the book as a "dreary treatise[s] advocating a new and weird Nazi religion". "Mythus" is written as an imitation of a scholarly book and Viereck notes that "Rosenberg bores both the uneducated and the well educated, but is the god of the semi-educated, whom earnest dullness and obscure grandiloquence impress as scholarly and authoritative". In his Nuremberg Trials testimony, the extermination camp commandant Rudolf Höss said that this book was one of the sources of his own anti-Semitism.

Despite Nazi official support for The Myth of the Twentieth Century and Rosenberg's prominent role in promoting Nazi ideology Adolf Hitler declared that it was not to be considered official ideology of the Nazi Party and he privately described the book as "mysticism" and "nonsense". Albert Speer claimed that Goebbels mocked Alfred Rosenberg. Goebbels also called the book a "philosophical belch". Hermann Göring said: "if Rosenberg was to decide ... we would only have rite, thing, myth and such kind of swindle." Gustave Gilbert, the prison psychologist during the Nuremberg Trials, reported that none of the Nazi leaders he interviewed had read Rosenberg's writings. However Gilbert's notes from the Nuremberg trials repeatedly show Rosenberg's influence.

Although he did take very high-level positions within the Nazi state in managing propaganda, looting artworks, and overseeing Nazi rule in the Baltics and Soviet territories, the overt anti-Christian sentiment in Rosenberg's book made it awkward to give Rosenberg positions of prominence when the Nazis ascended to power. Even in their stronghold Hamburg only 0.49% of the inhabitants identified as belonging to the anti-Christian neopagan faith movement (in 1937), whereas the German Christians and their Positive Christianity had a strong standing. Many of the attacks on the book after its 1930 publication came from its explicit anti-Christian message. In 1934, The Myth of the Twentieth Century was put into the Index Librorum Prohibitorum (the official list of books forbidden by the Catholic Church) by decree of the Holy Office for scorning and rejecting "all dogmas of the Catholic Church, and the very fundamentals of the Christian religion".

Rosenberg wrote two supplements to the work, replying to Catholic and Protestant critics. In the first, On the Dark Men of Our Times: A Reply to Critics of the Myth of the Twentieth Century, he accused Catholics of attempting to destroy the national character by promoting separatism within Catholic parts of the country. His second reply, Protestant Pilgrims to Rome: The Treason Against Luther and the Myth of the Twentieth Century, argued that modern Lutheranism was becoming too close to Catholicism. On the Dark Men of Our Times was also put into the Index Librorum Prohibitorum in 1935.

== Translations ==
=== English edition ===
The book has been published in English translation in 1982 by the Noontide Press in the United States. The translation was made by Vivian Bird and is titled The Myth of the Twentieth Century: An Evaluation of the Spiritual-Intellectual Confrontations of Our Age. This translation claims to be the first ever English translation.

== See also ==
- Antisemitism
- Aryan race
- Antisemitism in Christianity
- Occultism in Nazism
- Nordicism
- Denordification
- Race
- Racism
