= Giulio Cogni =

Italian writer, racial theorist, music composer and music critic

- Born: January 10, 1908; Siena
- Died: November 15, 1983 (aged 75)
- Occupations: writer, racial theorist, music composer, music critic
- Writing career
- Period: Italian Fascism

Giulio Cogni (January 10, 1908 – November 15, 1983) was an Italian writer, racial theorist, music composer and music critic.

== Life ==
Giulio Cogni taught psychology and musical esthetics at the Conservatorio Luigi Cherubini. He published articles in the publications, including Il Mattino, Il Messaggero, La Sicilia and Gazzetta del Sud.

Cogni was also an Italian racial theorist and member of the National Fascist Party of Italy. Cogni published Il Razzismo (1936) and sent it to Duce Benito Mussolini to review, initially Mussolini was not impressed with the work, however Cogni's ideas later entered into the official Fascist racial policy several years later. Mussolini appointed him to the editorial board of La Difesa della Razza, a recist magazine initiated in 1938. However, Cogni was removed from the post when he protested Mussolini and other leading fascist figures claiming that they had been using his views without making a reference to him.

In 1941 Giulio Cogni went to Weimar in Nazi Germany, where he met collaborating European writers and joined the Europäische Schriftstellervereinigung (European Writers' League), which was founded by Joseph Goebbels.

== Literature by Cogni ==
- Saggio sull’Amore come nuovo principio d’immortalità, Bocca, Torino (1933)
- Il Razzismo (1936)
- Lo Spirito Assoluto, La Nuova Italia, Firenze (1937)
- I valori della stirpe italiana, Bocca, Torino (1937)
- Il Segreto del Genio, Vallecchi, Firenze (1941)
- Le forze segrete della musica, Ticci, Siena (1942)
- Agape Sacre, Ausonia, Siena (1948)
- Agape Eterna, Maia, Siena (1952)
- Che cosa è la musica, Curci, Milano (1956)
- Marco Polo (1959), (ballet)
- Una notte nel bosco (1960), (ballet]
- Wagner e Beethoven, Sansoni, Firenze (1960)
- Livret d'opéra Tre sogni per Marina par Alberto Soresina
- Io sono te, Meschina, Milano (1970)
- Fra il suo teatro rappresentato: Empedocle (1951)
- I miracoli di Santa Caterina (1952)
- Il fantasma dell’Orto Botanico (1961)
- Bhagavadgita, il canto del beato (1980)
