= East Baltic race =

Obsolete racial classification of humans

The East Baltic race is one of the subcategories of the Europid race, into which it was divided by scientific racism in the early 20th century. Such racial typologies have been rejected by modern anthropology for several reasons.

The term East Baltic race was coined by anthropologist Rolf Nordenstreng, but was popularised by race theorist Hans F. K. Günther. This race was said to live in Finland, Estonia and northern Russia, and was also said to be found among the Slavic, Baltic, Uralic and even Germanic speakers (mainly due to Prussian and Swedish locals who migrated to the region throughout medieval and early modern times) of the Baltic sea area. It was characterised as "short-headed, broad-faced, with heavy, massive under-jaw, chin not prominent, flat, rather broad, short nose with low bridge; stiff, light (ash-blond) hair; light (grey or pale blue) eyes, standing out; light skin with a greyish undertone.

The American Eugenics Society described East Baltic people as being Mongolized.

Nazi philologist Josef Nadler declared the East Baltic race to be the main source of German Romanticism. Also in the Third Reich, philologist Julius Petersen wrote that Ludwig Tieck's Romanticism might have been promoted by his possible Slavic heritage, referring to American biographer Edwin H. Zeydel's theory that Tieck's grandmother was Russian.
