= Italian fascism and racism =

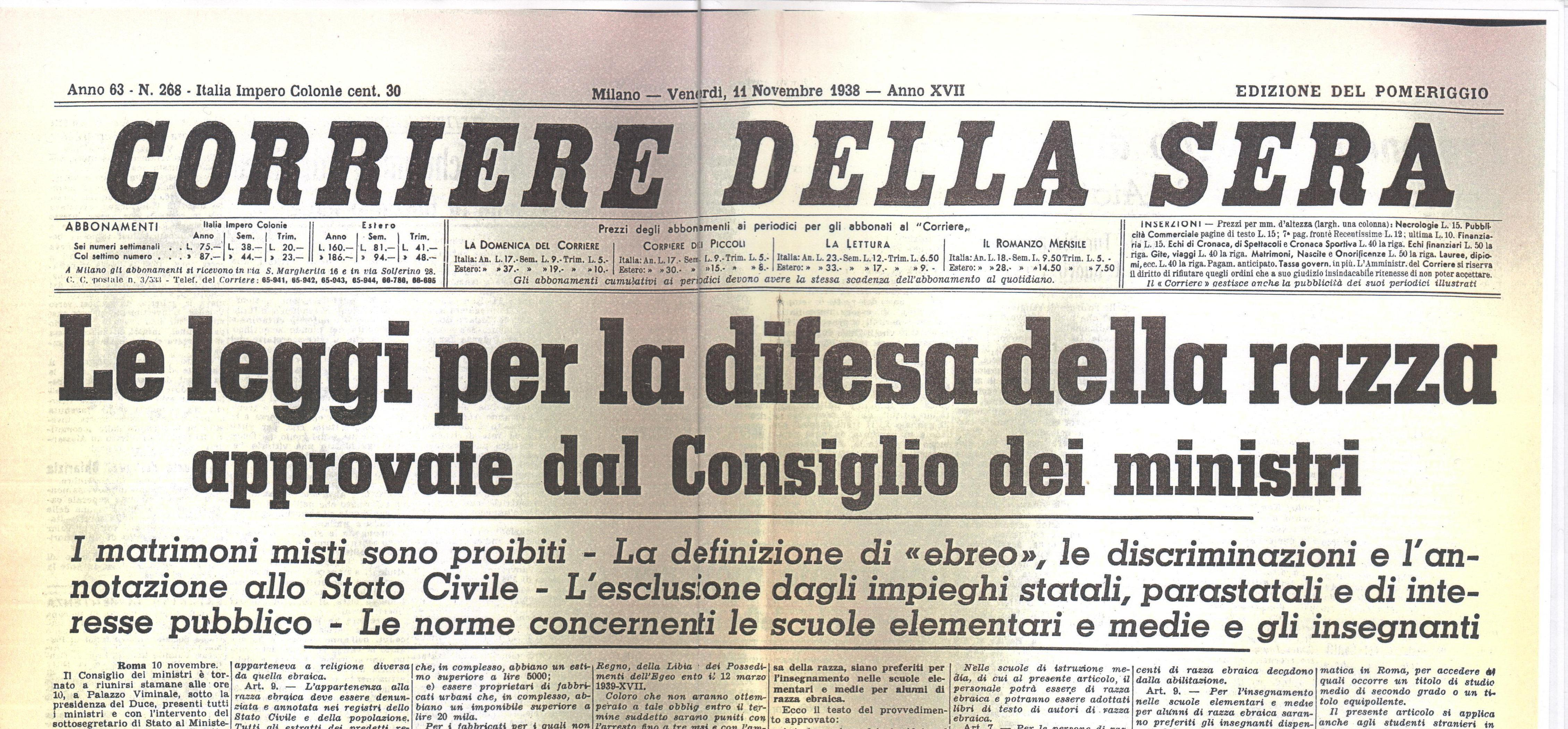
Front page of the Italian newspaper Corriere della Sera on 11 November 1938: "Le leggi per la difesa della razza approvate dal Consiglio dei ministri" (English: "The laws for the defence of race approved by the Council of Ministers"). On the same day, the Racial Laws entered into force under the Italian Fascist regime, enacting the racial discrimination and persecution of Italian Jews.

Initially, Fascist Italy did not enact comprehensive racist policies like those policies which were enacted by its World War II Axis partner Nazi Germany. Italy's National Fascist Party leader, Benito Mussolini, expressed different views on the subject of race over the course of his career.

In the 1920s, Mussolini stated concern over low birth rates of people of the white race across the world and warned that if the birth rates of whites were not improved that high birth rates among non-whites could lead to the white race being defeated in conflicts with non-white races. After the Second Italo-Ethiopian War, the Italian Fascist government implemented strict racial segregation between whites and blacks in Ethiopia.

In 1938, Fascist Italy enacted a set of comprehensive racial laws, that endorsed the Fascist "Manifesto of Race", the seventh point of which stated that "it is time that Italians proclaim themselves to be openly racist", although Mussolini privately said that the Manifesto was endorsed "entirely for political reasons" in deference to Nazi German wishes. The "Manifesto of Race", which was published on 14 July 1938, paved the way for the enactment of the Racial Laws. Leading members of the National Fascist Party (PNF), such as Dino Grandi and Italo Balbo, reportedly opposed the Racial Laws. Balbo, in particular, regarded antisemitism as having nothing to do with fascism and he staunchly opposed the antisemitic laws.

After 1938, discrimination and persecution intensified and became an increasingly important hallmark of Italian Fascist ideology and policies. Nevertheless, Mussolini and the Italian military did not consistently apply the laws adopted in the Manifesto of Race. In 1943, Mussolini expressed regret for the endorsement, saying that it could have been avoided.

== Italian race and scientific racism ==
Mussolini had initially rejected Nazi racism, especially the idea of a master race, as "arrant nonsense, stupid and idiotic". Initially, Fascist Italy did not enact comprehensive racist policies like those policies which were enacted by its World War II Axis partner Nazi Germany. Italy's National Fascist Party leader, Benito Mussolini, expressed different views on the subject of race over the course of his career. In an interview conducted in 1932 at the Palazzo di Venezia in Rome, he said "Race? It is a feeling, not a reality: ninety-five percent, at least, is a feeling. Nothing will ever make me believe that biologically pure races can be shown to exist today". It has also been indicated that Benito Mussolini had his own, if somewhat different from Nazism, brand of racist views. Mussolini attempted to reconcile the divisive racial discourse which had developed within the nation by asserting that he had already resolved the Southern question and as a result, he asserted that all Italians, not just Northerners, belonged to the "dominant race" which was the Aryan race.

In a 1921 speech in Bologna, Mussolini stated that "Fascism was born ... out of a profound, perennial need of this our Aryan and Mediterranean race". In this speech, Mussolini referred to the Italians as people who constituted the Mediterranean branch of the Aryan Race; Aryan here meant people whose language and culture were both Indo-European. Unlike National Socialism's biological racism, Italian fascism emphasized the belief that race was bound by spiritual and cultural foundations, and it divided peoples into a racial hierarchy which was based on spiritual and cultural factors. While Italian fascism based its conception of race on spiritual and cultural factors, Mussolini explicitly rejected the belief that biologically "pure" races were still considered a relevant factor in racial classifications. He claimed that italianità had assimilatory capacity. It used spiritual and cultural conceptions of race to make land claims on Istria and Dalmatia, and to justify an Italian sphere of influence in the Balkans based on then-present and historical Italian cultural influence in the Balkan Peninsula. The Italian Fascist regime justified colonial efforts in Africa by claiming that the spiritual and cultural superiority of Italians as part of the white race justified the right for the Fascist Italy and other European Powers to rule over the black race, while asserting the racial segregation of whites and blacks in its colonies. It claimed that fascism's colonial goals were to civilize the inferior races and defend the purity of Western civilization from racial miscegenation that it claimed would harm the intellectual qualities of the white race. It claimed that the white race needed to increase its natality in order to avoid being overtaken by the black and yellow races that were multiplying at a faster rate than whites.

Within the Italian Peninsula, colonies of the Italian Empire, and territories which were collectively identified as spazio vitale ("vital space") for the Italian race, the belief in the existence of a cultural-racial hierarchy in which different peoples were ranked in terms of their values was clearly defined by 1940, during which plans for the acquisition of Italy's spazio vitale were being formalized by the Fascist regime. The Fascist regime considered Italians to be superior to other European peoples which inhabited the Mediterranean Region—including Latin, Slavic, and Hellenic peoples—because only Italians had achieved racial unity and full political consciousness via the Fascist regime. Latin, Slavic, and Hellenic peoples were all considered superior to Turkic, Semitic, and Hamitic peoples. According to the racial hierarchy's classification of the indigenous peoples of Africa, the indigenous North Africans were superior to the indigenous people of Italian East Africa.

Even though it believed that Europeans were racially superior to non-Europeans, the Italian Fascist regime treated non-Europeans with diplomatic courtesy. The regime formed an alliance with Nazi Germany and the Japanese Empire, which was referred to as the "Tripartite Pact". The Indian independence movement's leader Mahatma Gandhi visited Italy in 1931 and he was invited for a personal visit by Mussolini, who treated him with full diplomatic courtesy. During his transatlantic flight from Italy to the United States in 1933, the fascist official Italo Balbo visited leaders of the Sioux tribe and he accepted the Sioux's honorary bestowing of his incorporation into the Sioux people, with the Sioux position and name "Chief Flying Eagle".

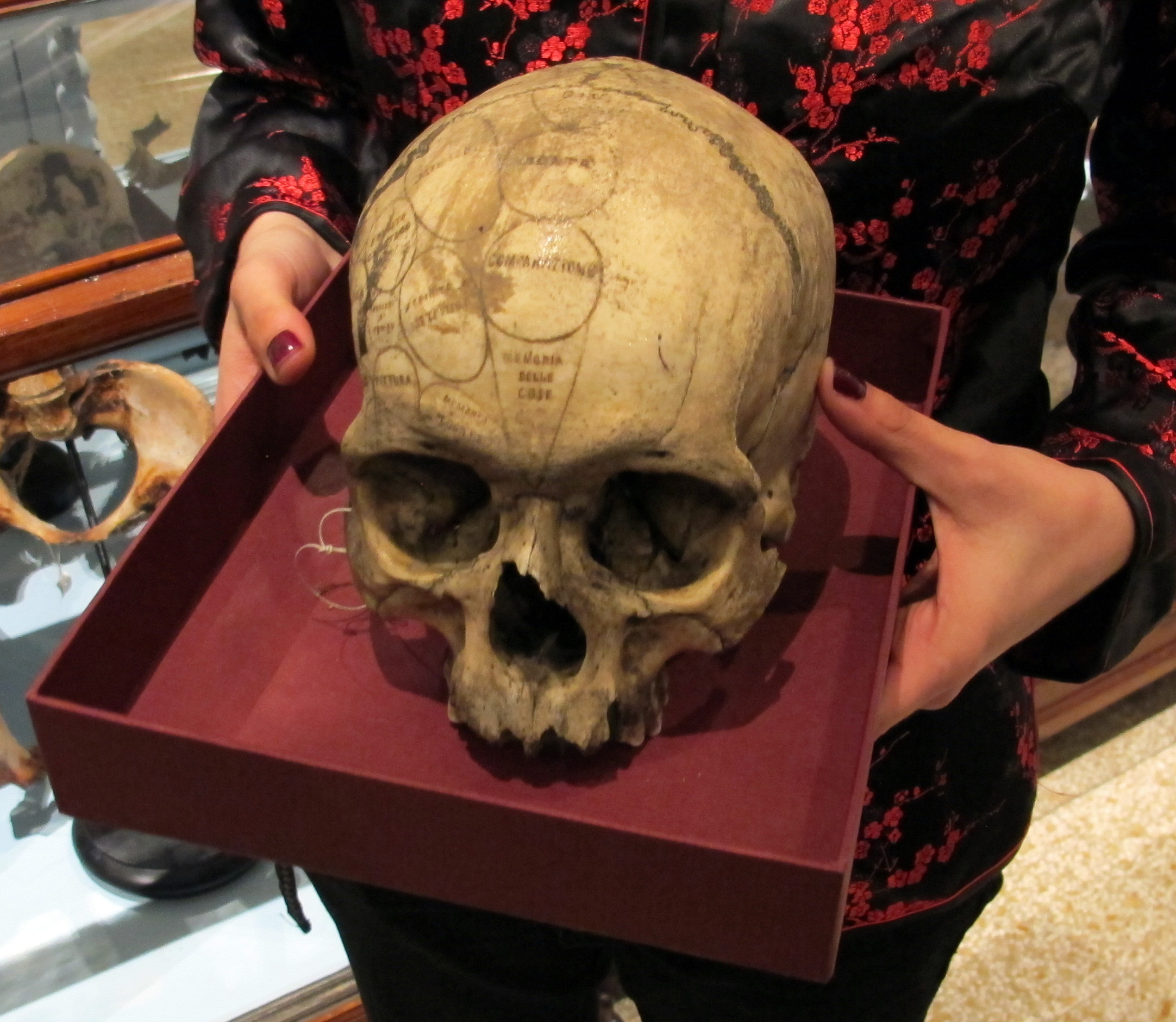
A skull sample of an "atavistic" individual studied by Cesare Lombroso, an Italian anthropologist and founder of the Italian school of criminology

Italian fascism strongly rejected the common Nordicist conception of the Aryan Race that idealized "pure" Aryans as having certain physical traits that were defined as "Nordic", such as blond hair and blue eyes. Nordicism was divisive because Italians—and especially Southern Italians—had been subjected to racial discrimination by Nordicist proponents in countries like the United States based on the belief that non-Nordic Southern Europeans were inferior to Nordics. In Italy, the influence of Nordicism had a divisive effect because Northern Italians who were influenced by Nordicism considered themselves a civilized people, in contrast to Southern Italians, who they considered biologically inferior to Northern Italians. At least some of the stereotypes of Southern Italians were created by Cesare Lombroso, a 19th-century criminologist and anthropologist. Due to his controversial theories, Lombroso was expelled from the Italian Society of Anthropology and Ethnology in 1882. The Lombrosian doctrine is currently considered pseudo-scientific.

Mussolini and other Italian Fascists viewed Nordicism with antipathy because they believed that peoples of Mediterranean racial heritage had an inferiority complex which had been instilled in them by German and Anglo-Saxon Nordicists, who considered Mediterranean peoples racially degenerate and therefore inferior to Nordic peoples. However, the traditional Nordicist belief that Mediterraneans were degenerate due to the fact that they had a darker skin colour than Nordics had long been rebuked in physical anthropology as a result of the development of the depigmentation theory, a theory which claimed that lighter-skinned peoples had been depigmented from peoples who had a darker skin colour and which, since its development, has become a widely accepted view in anthropology. In his work The races of Europe (1939), the anthropologist Carleton S. Coon subscribed to the depigmentation theory, the theory which claimed that the Nordic race's light-coloured skin resulted from the depigmentation of the skin of its ancestors, who were members of the Mediterranean race. Mussolini refused to allow Italy to return again to this inferiority complex, initially rejecting Nordicism.

In the early 1930s, with the rise to power of the Nazi Party (NSDAP) in the Weimar Republic and with its Führer Adolf Hitler's staunch emphasis on a Nordicist conception of the Aryan Race, strong tensions with regard to racial issues arose between the Italian Fascists and the Nazi Germans, because Hitler believed that Northern Italians were strongly Aryan. The Nazis believed that most of the ancient Romans were members of the Mediterranean race, and they believed that the members of the Roman ruling classes were also Nordic, descended from Aryan conquerors who migrated from the North, and in their view, this Nordic Aryan minority was responsible for the rise of Roman civilization. The Nazis viewed the collapse of the Roman Empire as being the result of the deterioration of the cultural-racial purity of the Nordic Aryan ruling class through its hypothetical intermixing with the inferior Mediterranean types, a process that allegedly led to the empire's decay. In addition, racial intermixing in the population, in general, was also blamed for Rome's downfall, according to this claim, Italians as a whole were a hybrid of races, including black African races. Due to the darker complexion of Mediterranean peoples, Hitler regarded them as having traces of Negroid blood so in his view, they were not pure Aryans and as a result, they were inferior to people who did not have such a racial heritage. The Nazis ascribed the great achievements of post-Roman era Northern Italians to the presence of a Nordic racial heritage in such people who had Germanic ancestors via their Nordic heritage, such as the Nazi ideologist Alfred Rosenberg, who believed that Michelangelo and Leonardo da Vinci were exemplary Nordic men of history. However, the Nazis did claim that aside from biologically Nordic people that a Nordic soul could inhabit a non-Nordic body. Hitler emphasized the role of Germanic influence in Northern Italy, for example, he stated that the art of Northern Italy was "nothing but pure German" art.

In the aftermath of the assassination of the Austrian Chancellor Engelbert Dollfuss, an ally of Fascist Italy killed by Austrian Nazis in 1934, Mussolini became enraged and he responded to the killing of Dollfuss by angrily denouncing Nazism. Mussolini rebuked Nazi Nordicism, claiming that the Nazis' belief in the existence of a common Nordic "Germanic race" was absurd by saying that "a Germanic race does not exist. [...] We repeat. Does not exist. Scientists say so. Hitler says so". The fact that Germans were not purely Nordic was indeed acknowledged by the prominent Nazi racial theorist Hans F. K. Günther in his 1922 book Rassenkunde des deutschen Volkes ("Racial Science of the German People"), where Günther recognized Germans as being composed of five racial types, namely Nordic, Mediterranean, Dinaric, Alpine, and East Baltic, while asserting that the Nordics were the highest in a racial hierarchy of the five types.

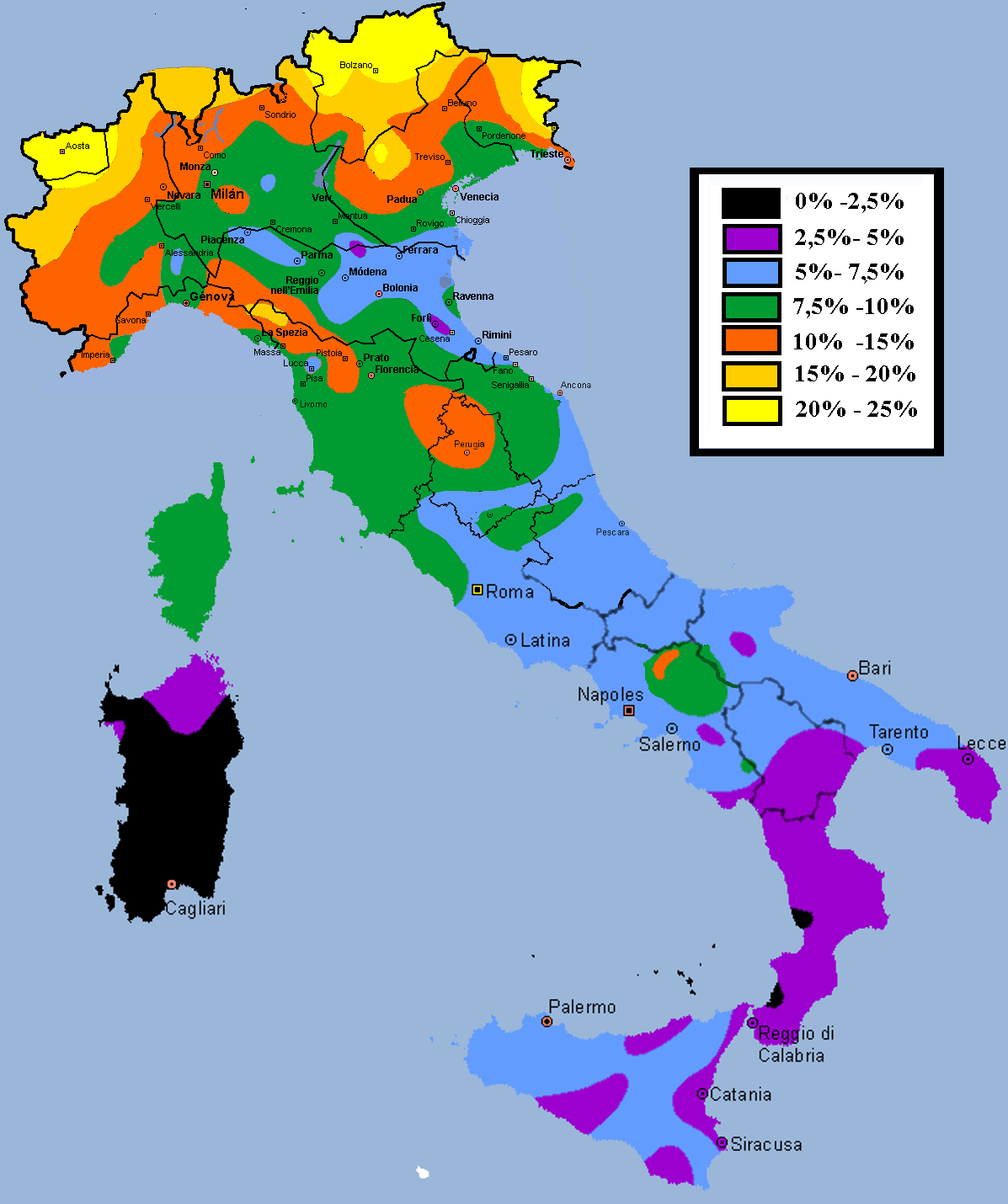
Geographical distribution of blond hair in the Italian geographical region, according to the physical anthropologist Renato Biasutti (1941)

By 1936, the tensions between Fascist Italy and Nazi Germany were reduced and relations between the two regimes became more amicable as a result. In 1936, Mussolini decided to launch a racial programme in Italy and he was interested in the racial studies which were being conducted by Giulio Cogni. Cogni was a Nordicist, but he did not equate Nordic identity with Germanic identity as was commonly done by German Nordicists. Cogni had travelled to Nazi Germany, where he was impressed by Nazi racial theories and he sought to develop his own racial theories. On 11 September 1936, Cogni sent Mussolini a copy of his newly published book Il Razzismo (1936). Cogni declared that the Mediterranean and Nordic racial subtypes of the Aryan race had a racial affinity and he also claimed that the intermixing of Nordic Aryans and Mediterranean Aryans in Italy produced a superior synthesis of Aryan Italians. Cogni addressed the racial differences which existed between northern and southern Italians, declaring that Southern Italians were a mixture of Aryan and non-Aryan races, he claimed that this mixture was most likely due to infiltration by Asiatic peoples in Roman times and later Arab invasions. As a result, Cogni believed that Southern Italian Mediterraneans were polluted by orientalizing tendencies. He would later change his view and claim that Nordics and Southern Italians were closely related groups, both racially and spiritually, because they were generally responsible for the creation of what is considered the best of European civilization. Initially, Mussolini was not impressed with Cogni's work, but Cogni's ideas were incorporated into the official fascist racial policy several years later.

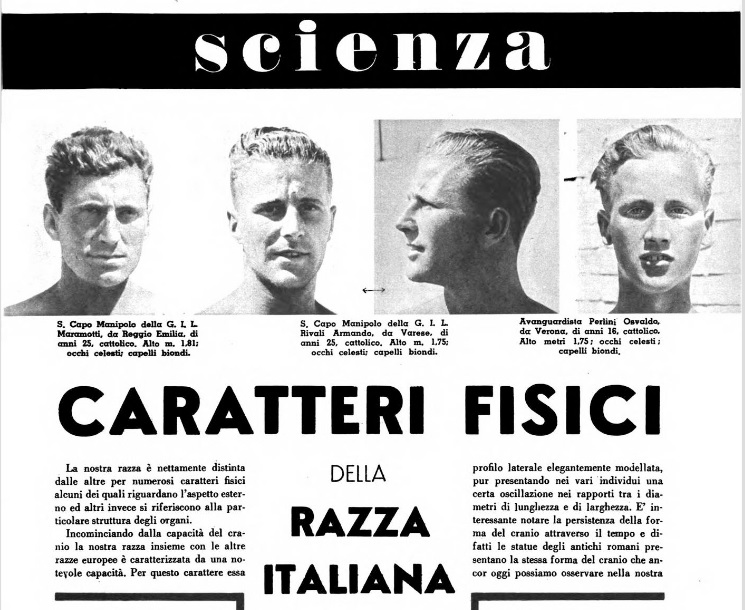
Portraits of four young men mainly of Nordic race from northern italy, featured in the 1938 issue of "La Difesa della Razza".

In 1938, Mussolini began to fear that if Italian fascism did not recognize the Nordic heritage which existed within Italians, the Mediterranean inferiority complex would return to Italian society. Therefore, in the summer of 1938, the fascist government officially recognized the Italians as having a Nordic heritage and it also recognized them as being of Nordic-Mediterranean descent in a meeting with PNF members. In June 1938 in a meeting with PNF members, Mussolini identified himself as having Nordic racial heritage and he also declared that the previous policy which focused on Mediterraneanism would be replaced with a policy which would focus on Aryanism.

The fascist regime began its publication of the racialist magazine La Difesa della Razza in 1938. The Nordicist racial theorist Guido Landra took a major role in the early work of La Difesa and published the Manifesto of Racial Scientists in the magazine in 1938. The Manifesto directly addressed its conception of racism and it also emphasized its autonomy from Nazi racial theories by stating:

The question of racism in Italy must be treated from a purely biological point of view, without any philosophical or religious implications. The conception of racism in Italy must be essentially Italian and along Aryan-Nordic lines. This does not mean however that German racial theories are being accepted word for word in Italy and that Italians and Scandinavians are the same. It merely wishes to indicate to the Italian people a physical model and even more importantly a psychological model of the human race that on account of its purely European characteristics is completely distinct from all extra-European races. This means to elevate the Italian to an ideal of superior consciousness of himself and to a greater sense of responsibility.

— Manifesto of Racial Scientists, Article 7

The emphasis on a psychological model of a superior human being as it was described in the Manifesto was written in reference to the views of the Italian antisemitic racial theorists Giovanni Papini and Paolo Orano, who stated that those Jews who had classified themselves as Italians were examples of inferior psychological types that were considered morally abject, false and cowardly, types that could not be associated with the Italian race. After Article 7 of the Manifesto, the remainder of it claimed that peoples which were either Arabids, Hamites, or Semites did not belong to the Italian race; and Article 10 declared that the physical and psychological characteristics of the Italian people must not be altered by crossbreeding with non-European races.

The Manifesto was strongly criticized, especially its assertion that Italians were a "pure race", because critics considered the notion absurd. La Difesa published other theories that described long-term Nordic Aryan amongst Italians, such as the theory that in the Eneolithic Age Nordic Aryans had settled in the Italian Peninsula. Many of the writers of La Difesa della Razza took up the traditional Nordicist claim that the decline and fall of the Roman Empire was due to the arrival of Semitic immigrants. La Difesa's writers were divided on their claims as to how Italians extricated themselves from Semitic influence.

The Nordicist direction of fascist racial policy was challenged in 1938 by a resurgence of the Mediterranean faction of the PNF. By 1939, the Mediterraneanists advocated a nativist racial theory which rejected ascribing the achievements of the Italian people to Nordic peoples. This nativist racial policy was prominently promoted by Ugo Rellini. Rellini rejected the notion of large-scale invasions of Italy by Nordic Aryans in the Eneolithic age and claimed that the Italians were an indigenous people who were descended from the Cro-Magnons. Rellini claimed that Mediterranean and later Nordic peoples arrived in small numbers and peacefully intermixed with the indigenous Italian population.

In 1941, the PNF's Mediterraneanists put forward a comprehensive definition of the Italian race through the influence of Giacomo Acerbo. However, these efforts were challenged by Mussolini's endorsement of Nordicist figures with the appointment of the staunch spiritual Nordicist Alberto Luchini as the head of Italy's Racial Office in May 1941, as well as by Mussolini's increasing interest in Julius Evola's spiritual Nordicism in late 1941. Acerbo and the Mediterraneanists in his High Council on Demography and Race sought to bring the regime back to supporting Mediterraneanism by thoroughly denouncing the pro-Nordicist Manifesto of the Racial Scientists. The Council recognized Aryans as being a linguistic-based group and condemned the Manifesto for denying the influence of pre-Aryan civilization on modern Italy, saying that the Manifesto "constitutes an unjustifiable and undemonstrable negation of the anthropological, ethnological, and archaeological discoveries that have occurred and are occurring in our country". Furthermore, the Council denounced the Manifesto for "implicitly" crediting Germanic invaders of Italy in the guise of the Lombards for having "a formative influence on the Italian race in a disproportional degree to the number of invaders and to their biological predominance". The Council claimed that the obvious superiority of the ancient Greeks and Romans in comparison with the ancient Germanic tribes made it inconceivable that Italian culture owed a debt to ancient Aryan Germans. The Council denounced the Manifesto's Nordicist supremacist attitude towards Mediterraneans that it claimed was "considering them as slaves" and was "a repudiation of the entire Italian civilization".

== Ethnic groups ==
=== Jews and Africans ===
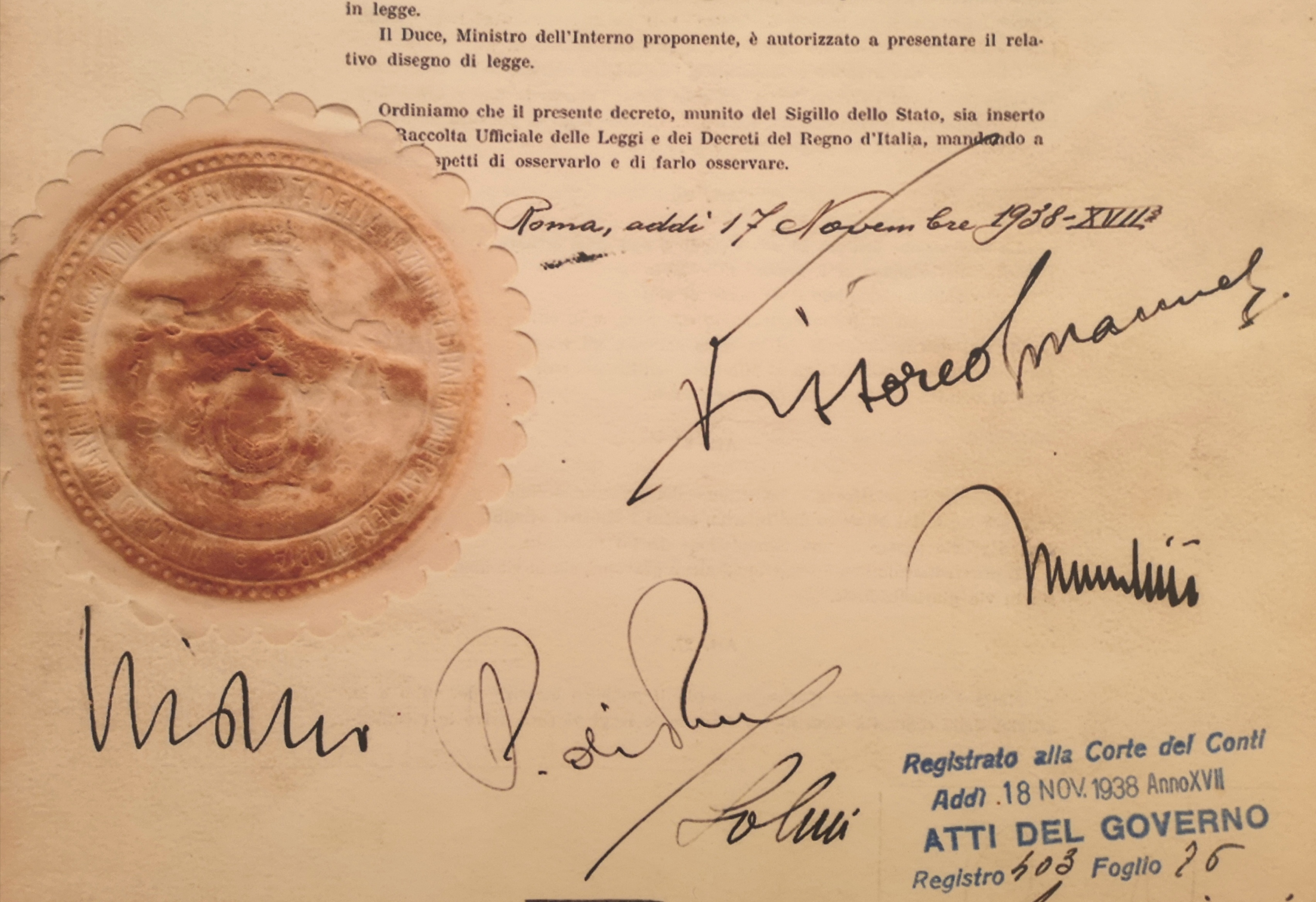
The Racial Laws, signed by King Victor Emmanuel III, Benito Mussolini, Galeazzo Ciano, Paolo Thaon di Revel, and Arrigo Solmi (17 November 1938)

For a significant time Mussolini as leader of the Fascist movement considered Italian Jews to be Italians, but this belief may have been influenced more by his anti-clericalism and the general mood of Italy at the time, which denounced the abusive treatment of the Jews in the Roman Ghetto by the Papal States until the Unification of Italy. In the early 1920s, Mussolini published an article which stated that Fascism would never elevate a "Jewish Question" and that "Italy knows no antisemitism and we believe that it will never know it" and then elaborated "let us hope that Italian Jews will continue to be sensible enough so as not to give rise to antisemitism in the only country where it has never existed". In 1932 during a conversation with Emil Ludwig, Mussolini described antisemitism as a "German vice" and stated: "There was 'no Jewish Question' in Italy and could not be one in a country with a healthy system of government". On several occasions, Mussolini spoke positively about Jews and the Zionist movement.

Mussolini originally distinguished his position from Hitler's fanatical racism while affirming that he himself was a Zionist. More broadly, he even proposed building a mosque in Rome as a sign that Italy was the "Protector of Islam" in colonial Africa, a move blocked by a horrified Pope Pius XI. There were however some fascists, Roberto Farinacci and Giovanni Preziosi being prime examples, who held fringe and extremely racist views before Fascist Italy formed its alliance with Nazi Germany. Preziosi was the first to publish an Italian edition of the Protocols of the Elders of Zion, in 1Flag of the Republic Ilirida.svg1, which was published almost simultaneously with a version issued by Umberto Benigni in supplements to Fede e Ragione. However, the book had little impact until the mid-1930s.

Mussolini originally held the view that a small contingent of Italian Jews had lived in Italy "since the days of the Kings of Rome" (a reference to the Bené Roma) and as a result, they should "remain undisturbed". One of Mussolini's mistresses, Margherita Sarfatti, was Jewish. There were even some Jewish members in the National Fascist Party (PNF), such as Ettore Ovazza, who founded the Jewish Fascist paper La Nostra Bandiera in 1935. Mussolini once declared "Anti-Semitism does not exist in Italy... Italians of Jewish birth have shown themselves good citizens and they fought bravely in [World War I]."

Despite the presence of a Fascist regime, some Jewish refugees considered Italy a safe haven in the first half of the 1930s. During that period, the country hosted up to 11,000 persecuted Jews, including 2,806 Jews who were of German descent. However, as early as 1934, Jewish personnel were removed from institutions and state organizations. 1934 also saw press campaigns against anti-fascist Jews, in which they were equated with Zionists. Between 1936 and 1938, the Fascist regime endorsed antisemitic propaganda, which was mounting in the press and even in graffiti. Equally, scholars of eugenetics, statistics, anthropology, and demographics began to outline racist theories.

In his early years as the ruler of Fascist Italy, Mussolini harboured negative stereotypes of Jews, but he did not hold a firm stance on Jews and his official stances oscillated and shifted to meet the political demands of the various factions of the Fascist movement, so they were not concrete. Mussolini had held antisemitic beliefs prior to becoming a fascist, such as in a 1908 essay on the topic of Nietzsche's Übermensch, in which Mussolini condemned "pallid Judeans" for "wrecking" the Roman Empire; and in 1913 he again wrote about the Jews having caused havoc in ancient Rome. Although Mussolini held these negative attitudes, he was aware that Italian Jews were a deeply integrated and small community in Italy and by and large, they were favourably perceived in Italy because they valiantly fought for Italy during World War I. Of the 117 original members of the Fasci Italiani di Combattimento founded on 23 March 1919, five were Jewish. Since the movement's early years, there were a small number of prominent openly antisemitic fascists such as Roberto Farinacci. There were also prominent fascists who completely rejected antisemitism, such as Italo Balbo, who lived in Ferrara, which had a substantial Jewish community that was accepted, and as a result, antisemitic incidents were rare in the city.

In response to his observation that a large number of the Bolsheviks were Jews as well as claims that the Bolsheviks and Germany (the nation that Italy fought against during World War I) were politically connected, Mussolini made antisemitic statements involving the Bolshevik-German connection as being an "unholy alliance between Hindenburg and the synagogue". Mussolini came to believe rumours that Bolshevik leader Vladimir Lenin was of Jewish descent. In an article in Il Popolo d'Italia in June 1919, Mussolini wrote a highly antisemitic analysis on the situation in Europe involving Judeo–Bolshevism following the October Revolution, the Russian Civil War and war in Hungary involving the Hungarian Soviet Republic:

If Petrograd (Pietrograd) does not yet fall, if [General] Denikin is not moving forward, then this is what the great Jewish bankers of London and New York have decreed. These bankers are bound by ties of blood to those Jews who in Moscow as in Budapest are taking their revenge on the Aryan race that has condemned them to dispersion for so many centuries. In Russia, 80 per cent of the managers of the Soviets are Jews, in Budapest 17 out of 22 people's commissars are Jews. Might it not be that bolshevism is the vendetta of Judaism against Christianity?? It is certainly worth pondering. It is entirely possible that bolshevism will drown in the blood of a pogrom of catastrophic proportions. World finance is in the hands of the Jews. Whoever owns the strongboxes of the people is in control of their political systems. Behind the puppets (making peace) in Paris, there are the Rothschilds, the Warburgs, the Schiffs, the Guggenheims who are of the same blood who are conquering Petrograd and Budapest. Race does not betray race. [...] Bolshevism is a defence of the international plutocracy. This is the basic truth of the matter. The international plutocracy dominated and controlled by Jews has a supreme interest in all of Russian life accelerating its process of disintegration to the point of paroxysm. A Russia that is paralyzed, disorganized, and starved, will be a place where tomorrow the bourgeoisie, yes the bourgeoisie, o proletarians will celebrate its spectacular feast of plenty.

— Benito Mussolini, Il Popolo d'Italia, June 1919

Mussolini's statement about a Jewish–Bolshevik–plutocratic connection and the existence of an international Jewish conspiracy was met with opposition in the Fascist movement, resulting in Mussolini responding to this opposition amongst his supporters by abandoning this stance shortly afterwards in 1919. Upon abandoning this stance due to opposition to it, Mussolini no longer said his previous assertion that Bolshevism was Jewish, but warned that, due to the large numbers of Jews in the Bolshevik movement, the rise of Bolshevism in the Russian Empire would result in a ferocious wave of antisemitism in Russia. He then claimed that "antisemitism is foreign to the Italian people", but warned Zionists that they should be careful not to stir up antisemitism in "the only country where it has not existed".

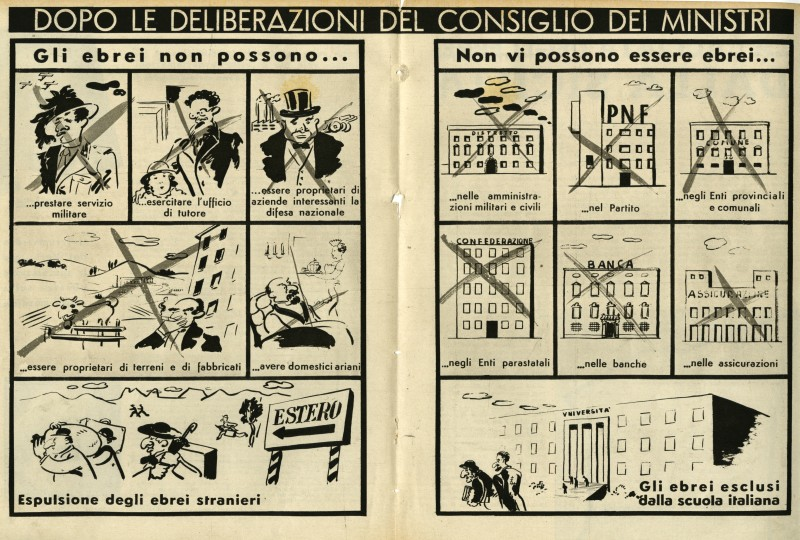
Antisemitic cartoon published in the Fascist periodical La Difesa della Razza, after the promulgation of the Racial Laws (15 November 1938)

Margherita Sarfatti was an influential Jewish member of the National Fascist Party (PNF), who Mussolini had known since both of them previously had been members of the Italian Socialist Party (PSI); furthermore, she had been his mistress and helped him write Dux (1926), a biography of Mussolini himself. One of the Jewish financial supporters of the fascist movement was Toeplitz, whom Mussolini had earlier accused of being a traitor during World War I. Another prominent Jewish Italian fascist was Ettore Ovazza, who was a staunch Italian nationalist and an opponent of Zionism in Italy. 230 Italian Jews took part in the fascists' March on Rome in 1922. In the early 1920s, Mussolini was cautious on topics of Italian Jewish financiers that arose from time to time from antisemitic elements in the fascist movement, while he regarded them as untrustworthy he believed that he could draw them to his side. In 1932, Mussolini made his private attitude about Jews known to the Austrian ambassador when discussing the issue by saying: "I have no love for the Jews, but they have great influence everywhere. It is better to leave them alone. Hitler's antisemitism has already brought him more enemies than is necessary".

On the eve of the March on Rome, the leadership of the PNF declared that "a Jewish question does not exist in our country and let us hope that there never shall be one, at least not until Zionism poses Italian Jews with the dilemma of choosing between their Italian homeland and another homeland". The relations between the Fascist regime and Italian Jews was affected by Fascist Italy's accommodation of the Catholic Church from 1929 onwards, in which Mussolini sought to settle the long-standing "Roman Question" with the Holy See by removing previous provisions of equality of faiths and impose state support of the supremacy of Roman Catholicism in Fascist Italy in order to appease the Vatican.

In 1928, frustration with Zionism arose in the regime and Mussolini addressed the Italian Zionist Congress by publicly posing a question to Italian Jews about their self-identity: "Are you a religion or are you a nation?". Zionist and anti-Zionist Jews responded, the anti-Zionist Jews professed that they were religious Jews as part of the Italian nation, while the Zionist Jews declared that there was no dispute between the Zionist movement and the Italian nation and they also said that all Italian Jews held patriotic respect for Italy. Upon these responses arriving, Mussolini declared that these revealed that a Jewish problem existed in terms of Jewish identity in Italy as a result of conflicting national loyalties amongst Zionist Jews by saying:

My intention was to seek a clarification among Italian Jews and to open the eyes of Christian Italians. [...] This goal has been achieved. The problem exists, and it is no longer confined to that "shadowy sphere" where it had been constituted astutely by the former, ingeniously by the latter.

— Benito Mussolini, 1928

At that time, Italian fascists were not wholly opposed to Zionism; instead, they took an instrumental approach to it. They were hostile to it when it caused conflicts with Italy's Catholic community and they were also hostile to some Zionists when they believed that the latter were supporting British interests, but they were favourable to Zionists who opposed the British and sought Italy's support and protection. In 1929, Mussolini acknowledged the contributions which Italian Jews had made to Italian society, despite their minority status, and he believed that Jewish culture was Mediterranean, aligning his early opinion of Italian Jews with his early Mediterraneanist perspective. He also argued that Italian Jews were natives to Italy, as they had been living in the Italian Peninsula since Roman times. In the early 1930s, Mussolini held discussions with Zionist leadership figures over proposals to encourage the emigration of Italian Jews to the mandate of Palestine, as Mussolini hoped that the presence of pro-Italian Jews in the region would weaken pro-British sentiment and potentially overturn the British mandate.

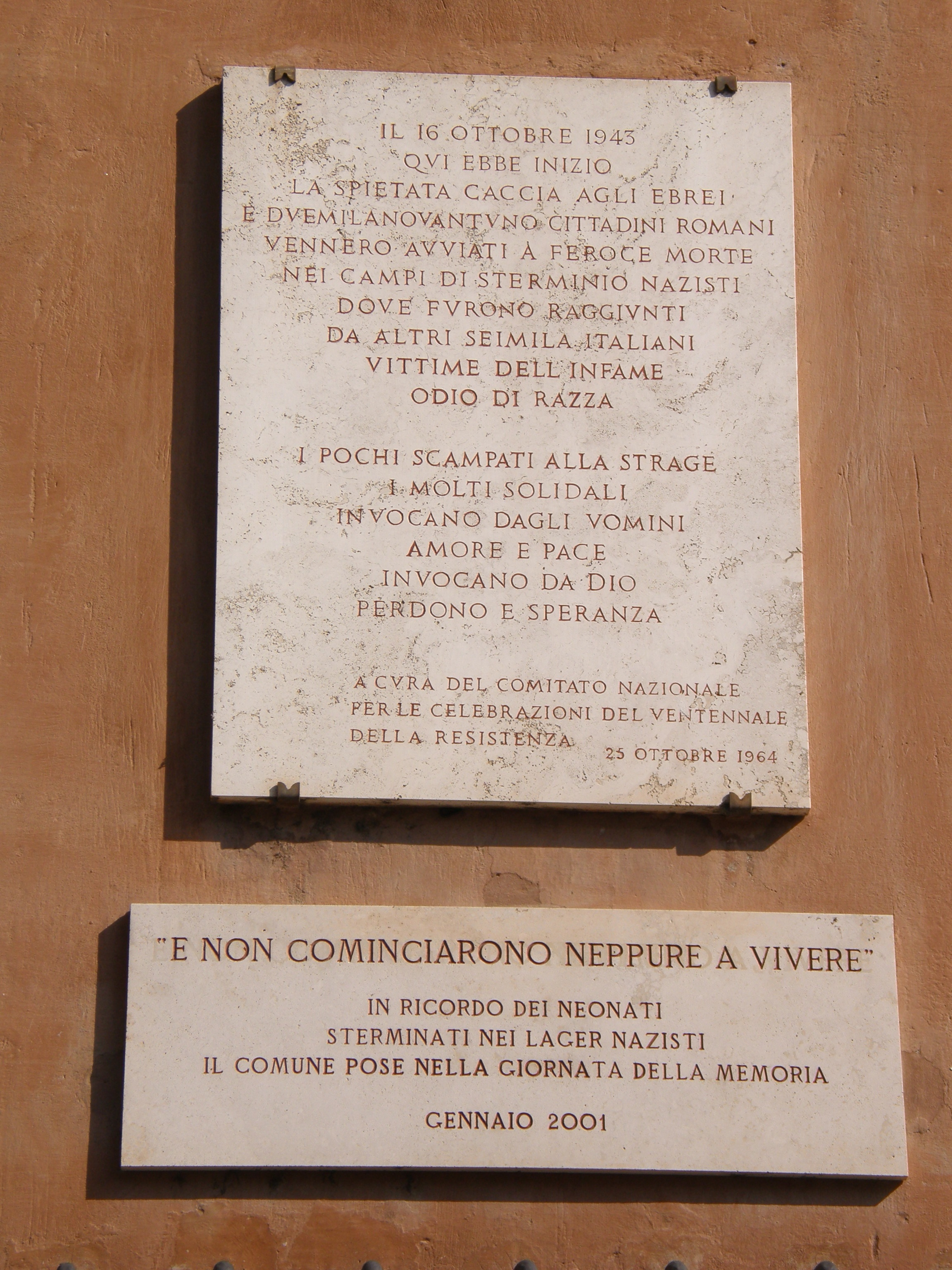
A Holocaust memorial in Rome's Jewish ghetto, Italy

At the 1934 Montreux Fascist conference which was chaired by the Italian-led Comitati d'Azione per l'Universalita di Roma (CAUR) that sought to found a Fascist International, the issue of antisemitism was debated about by various fascist parties, with some of them being more favourable to it and others being less favourable to it. Two final compromises were adopted, creating the official stance of the Fascist International:

[T]he Jewish question cannot be converted into a universal campaign of hatred against the Jews [...] Considering that in many places certain groups of Jews are installed in conquered countries, exercising in an open and occult manner an influence injurious to the material and moral interests of the country which harbours them, constituting a sort of state within a state, profiting by all benefits and refusing all duties, Christian civilization, the Conference denounces the nefarious action of these elements and is ready to combat them.

— CAUR, 1934

From 1934 to 1938, Fascist Italy hosted the Betar Naval Academy in Civitavecchia to train Zionist cadets under Betar leader Ze'ev Jabotinsky, on the grounds that a Jewish state would be in Italy's national interest. In a discussion with the President of the World Zionist Organization Chaim Weizmann over requests for Italy to provide refuge for Jews fleeing Nazi Germany, Mussolini agreed that he would accept Jewish refugees but warned Weizmann about the consequences if such Jews harmed Italy by saying:

I don't hide from you that the collusion of the Jewish world with the plutocracy and international left is ever more evident, and our politico-military situation doesn't permit us to keep in our bosom eventual saboteurs of the effort that the Italian people are making.

— Benito Mussolini, mid-1930s in conversation with Chaim Weizmann

Italian fascism's attitudes towards Zionism and Jews, in general, underwent a shift in response to the Second Italo-Ethiopian War. At the outset of the war, Mussolini sought to gain favourable support for Italy's intervention in Ethiopia and appealed to Zionists by offering them a solution to the Jewish question, in which Italy would set aside a certain amount of territory from conquered Ethiopia to be a homeland for the Jewish people. Mussolini claimed that territory from conquered Ethiopia would make an ideal homeland for the Jews, noting that there were large numbers of Falasha already living there who identified as Jews. However, Zionist leaders rejected this proposal. Mussolini said:

World Jewry is doing a bad business in aligning itself with the anti-Fascist sanctions campaign against the one European country which, at least until now, has neither practised nor preached anti-Semitism

— Benito Mussolini, 1936

In 1936, the Fascist regime began to promote racial antisemitism and Mussolini claimed that international Jewry had sided with the United Kingdom against Fascist Italy during the Second Italo-Ethiopian War. Historian Renzo De Felice believed that the fascist regime's pursuit of an alliance with Nazi Germany that began in 1936 explains the adoption of antisemitism as a pragmatic component of the pursuit of that alliance. De Felice's interpretation has been challenged by H. Stuart Hughes, who has claimed that direct Nazi pressure to adopt antisemitic policy had little or no impact on Mussolini's decision. Hughes notes that the Fascist version of antisemitism was based on spiritualist considerations while eschewing anthropological or biological arguments, unlike the Nazi version of antisemitism. Italian fascism adopted antisemitism in the late 1930s and Mussolini personally returned to invoke antisemitic statements as he had done earlier. The Fascist regime used antisemitic propaganda for the Spanish Civil War from 1937 to 1938 that emphasized that Italy was supporting the Nationalist faction against a "Jewish International".

The "Manifesto of Race", which was published on 14 July 1938, paved the way for the enactment of the Racial Laws (Leggi Razziali). Leading members of the National Fascist Party (PNF), such as Dino Grandi and Italo Balbo, reportedly opposed the Racial Laws. Balbo, in particular, regarded antisemitism as having nothing to do with fascism and staunchly opposed the antisemitic laws. The Racial Laws were promulgated on 18 November 1938, excluding Italian Jews from the civil service, the armed forces, and the National Fascist Party (PNF), and restricting Jewish ownership of certain companies and property; Jewish–Christian intermarriage was also prohibited. The first and most important of the Racial Laws was the Regio Decreto 17 Novembre 1938, Nr. 1728. It restricted the civil rights of Italian Jews, banned books written by Jewish authors, and excluded Jews from public offices and higher education. Additional laws stripped Jews of their assets, restricted travel, and finally, provided for their confinement in internal exile, as was done for political prisoners. In recognition of both their past and future contributions and for their service as subjects of the Italian Empire, Mussolini passed a decree in 1937 distinguishing the Eritreans and Ethiopians from other subjects of the newly-founded colonial empire. In the Kingdom of Italy, Eritreans and Ethiopians were to be addressed as "Africans" and not as natives, as was the case with the other African peoples subjected to the colonial rule of the Italian Empire.

The promulgation of the Racial Laws was preceded by a long press campaign and the publication of the "Manifesto of Race" earlier in 1938, a purportedly-scientific report which was signed by scientists and supporters of the National Fascist Party (PNF); among the 180 signers of the "Manifesto of Race" were two medical doctors (S. Visco and N. Fende), an anthropologist (L. Cipriani), a zoologist (E. Zavattari), and a statistician (F. Savorgnan). The "Manifesto of Race", published in July 1938, declared the Italians to be descendants of the Aryan race. It targeted races that were seen as inferior (i.e. not of Aryan descent). In particular, Jews were banned from many professions. Under the Racial Laws, sexual relations and marriages between Italians, Jews, and Africans were forbidden. Jews were banned from positions in banking, government, and education, as well as having their properties confiscated.

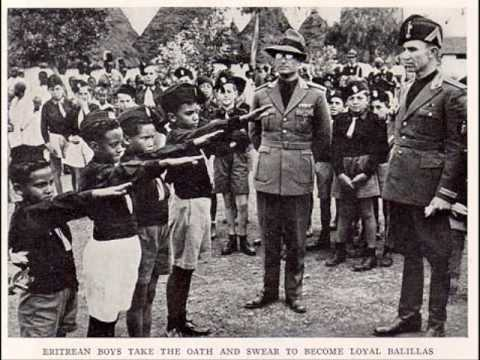
Eritrean Balilla children pledge allegiance to the National Fascist Party (1922).

The final decision about the Racial Laws was made during the meeting of the Grand Council of Fascism (Gran Consiglio del Fascismo), which took place on the night between 6 and 7 of October 1938 in Rome, Palazzo Venezia. Not all Italian Fascists supported discrimination: while the pro-German, anti-Jewish Roberto Farinacci and Giovanni Preziosi strongly pushed for them, Italo Balbo and Dino Grandi strongly opposed the Racial Laws. Balbo, in particular, regarded antisemitism as having nothing to do with fascism and staunchly opposed the antisemitic laws. The Racial Laws prohibited Jews from most professional positions as well as prohibited sexual relations and marriages between Italians, Jews, and Africans. The press in Fascist Italy highly publicized the "Manifesto of Race", which included a mixture of biological racism and history; it declared that Italians belonged to the Aryan race, Jews were not Italians, and that it was necessary to distinguish between Europeans and non-Europeans.

While some scholars argue that this was an attempt by Mussolini to placate Adolf Hitler, who increasingly exerted influence over Mussolini in the late 1930s, and is speculated to have pressured him to increase the racial discrimination and persecution of Jews in the Kingdom of Italy, others believe that it reflected sentiments long entrenched not just in Fascist political philosophy but also in the teachings of the post-Tridentine Catholic Church, which remained a powerful cultural force in Mussolini's Fascist regime, representing a uniquely Italian flavour of antisemitism in which Jews were seen as an obstacle to the Fascist transformation of Italian society due to being bound to what Mussolini saw as decadent liberal democracies.

According to the diaries which were written by his mistress, Clara Petacci, Mussolini purportedly boasted about being racist from the beginning, and that his racism was not because of Hitler's influence:

I was already a racist in 1921. I don't know how they can think that I imitate Hitler. They make me laugh.

Mussolini continued regarding the new anti-semitic policies:

These disgusting Jews, we must destroy them all. I will make a massacre as the Turks have done. They are carrion, enemies and cowards.

Il Tevere, an Italian Fascist newspaper founded by Mussolini and directed by Telesio Interlandi, frequently promoted anti-Semitism and railed against the alleged threat of "international Jewry". It was a frequent source of praise for Adolf Hitler's anti-Semitic policies until its disbandment after the fall of Mussolini and the Fascist regime on 25 July 1943. In the aftermath of Mussolini's fall from power, the Badoglio government suppressed the Racial Laws in the Kingdom of Italy. However, they remained enforced and the severity of them was intensified in the territories which were ruled by the Italian Social Republic (1943–1945) until the end of the Second World War.

=== Slavs ===
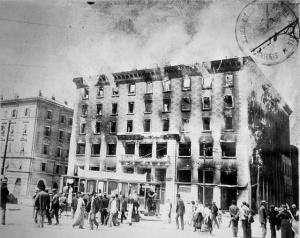
Fascists burn the Slovenian Narodni dom ("National Home") in Trieste, 13 July 1920.

In the 1920s, Italian Fascists targeted Yugoslavs, especially Serbs and Slovenes. They accused Serbs of having "atavistic impulses" and they claimed that the Yugoslavs were conspiring together on behalf of "Grand Orient masonry and its funds". One anti-Semitic claim was that Serbs were part of a "social-democratic, masonic Jewish internationalist plot".

Benito Mussolini considered the Slavic race inferior and barbaric. He identified the Yugoslavs (Croats) as a threat to Italy and viewed them as competitors over the region of Dalmatia, which was claimed by Italy, and claimed that the threat rallied Italians together at the end of World War I: "The danger of seeing the Jugo-Slavians settle along the whole Adriatic shore had caused a bringing together in Rome of the cream of our unhappy regions. Students, professors, workmen, citizens—representative men—were entreating the ministers and the professional politicians".

In September 1920, Benito Mussolini stated:

When dealing with such a race as Slavic—inferior and barbarian—we must not pursue the carrot, but the stick policy. ... We should not be afraid of new victims. ... The Italian border should run across the Brenner Pass, Monte Nevoso and the Dinaric Alps. ... I would say we can easily sacrifice 500,000 barbaric Slavs for 50,000 Italians.

— Benito Mussolini, speech held in Pula, 22 February 1922

As noted by the Minister of Foreign Affairs in Mussolini's government, Galeazzo Ciano, when describing a meeting with the secretary general of the Fascist party who wanted an Italian army to kill all Slovenes:

I took the liberty of saying they (the Slovenes) totaled one million. It doesn't matter—he replied firmly—we should model ourselves upon ascari (auxiliary Eritrean troops infamous for their cruelty) and wipe them out".

The Province of Ljubljana saw the deportation of 25,000 people, which equaled 7.5% of its total population. The operation, one of the most drastic in Europe, filled up Italian concentration camps on the island of Rab, in Gonars, Monigo (Treviso), Renicci d'Anghiari, Chiesanuova, as well as other concentration camps that were located elsewhere.

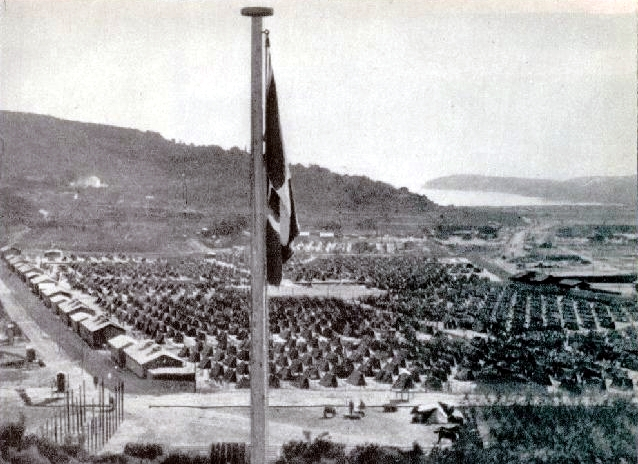
Rab concentration camp

Mario Roatta's "Circular 3C" (Circolare 3C), tantamount to a declaration of war on the Slovene civilian population, involved him in war crimes while he was the commander of the 2nd Army in the Province of Ljubljana.

In 1942, the Italians put the barbed wire fence (which is now the Trail of Remembrance and Comradeship) around Ljubljana in order to prevent communication between the Liberation Front in the city and the partisans in the surrounding countryside.

On 25 February 1942, only two days after the Italian Fascist regime established the Gonars concentration camp the first transport of 5,343 internees (1,643 of whom were children) arrived at the Rab concentration camp which was already overpopulated at the time, from the Province of Ljubljana itself as well as another Italian concentration camp in Monigo (near Treviso).

The Italian violence against the Slovene civilian population easily matched the German violence against Serbs, with frequent summary executions of Slovenes committed on the orders of Mussolini and other Fascist officials. For every major military operation, Roatta issued additional special instructions, including one that the orders must be "carried out most energetically and without any false compassion".

One of Roatta's soldiers wrote home on 1 July 1942: "We have destroyed everything from top to bottom without sparing the innocent. We kill entire families every night, beating them to death or shooting them."

After the war Roatta was on a list of the most wanted Italian war criminals who were indicted by Yugoslavia and other countries, but Italy never saw anything like the Nuremberg trials because at the beginning of the Cold War, the British government believed that Pietro Badoglio, who was also on the list, would guarantee the existence of an anti-communist post-war Italy.

=== Other groups ===
During a 1921 speech in Bologna, Mussolini stated that "Fascism was born... out of a profound, perennial need of this our Aryan race". Mussolini was concerned about the alleged low birth rate of the White race in contrast to the allegedly higher birth rates of the Negroid (African) and Mongoloid (Asian) races. In 1928 he talked about the alleged high birth-rate of asians and blacks in the United States, and stated that they had surpassed the population of White Americans in certain areas, such as Harlem in New York City. He described their greater racial consciousness in contrast to that of White Americans as contributing to their growing strength. On the issue of the low birth rate of White people, Mussolini said in 1928:

[When the] city dies, the nation – deprived of the young life-blood of new generations – is now made up of people who are old and degenerate and cannot defend itself against a younger people which launches an attack on the now unguarded frontiers [...] This will happen, and not just to cities and nations, but on an infinitely greater scale: the whole White race, the Western race can be submerged by other coloured races which are multiplying at a rate unknown in our race."

During the Great Depression, Mussolini again expressed his alarm about the low birth rate among Whites, saying: "The singular, enormous problem is the destiny of the white race. Europe is truly towards the end of its destiny as the leader of civilization." He went on to say that under the circumstances, "the white race is sickly", "morally and physically in ruin", and that in combination with the "progress in numbers and in expansion of yellow and black races, the civilization of the white man is destined to perish." According to Mussolini, only through promoting natality and eugenics could this be reversed. In 1933, Mussolini contradicted his earlier statements on race, saying: "Race! It is a feeling, not a reality: ninety-five percent, at least, is a feeling. Nothing will ever make me believe that biologically pure races can be shown to exist today. ... National pride has no need of the delirium of race."

During and after the Second Italo-Ethiopian War, thousands of Italian settlers flooded into Italian East Africa, prompting Mussolini to implement a variety of racist laws designed to showcase his vision of an ideal Fascist society. These were unique in their extent and comprehensiveness at attempting to enforce White supremacy even relative to other European colonies, which generally maintained much more informal systems of racial segregation. Mussolini took a vested interest in micromanaging these regulations, at one point reading a report of a non-commissioned officer playing cards with a native Eritrean and angrily telegraphing the governor of Eritrea to complain about the incident and demanding stricter enforcement of racial segregation. Enforcement of these laws was very difficult for local authorities, however, in part due to the impermanent presence of many Italians in the colony, who had no plans to stay in East Africa in the long term and only briefly resided there for financial opportunities. As such, many Italian settlers ignored these laws due to a variety of factors; some Italians saw short-term economic gain in violating laws restricting personal and commercial relations between settlers and Africans, while others simply did not share Mussolini's political stance.
