= Italian racial laws =

Race laws promulgated in Fascist Italy (1938–1944)

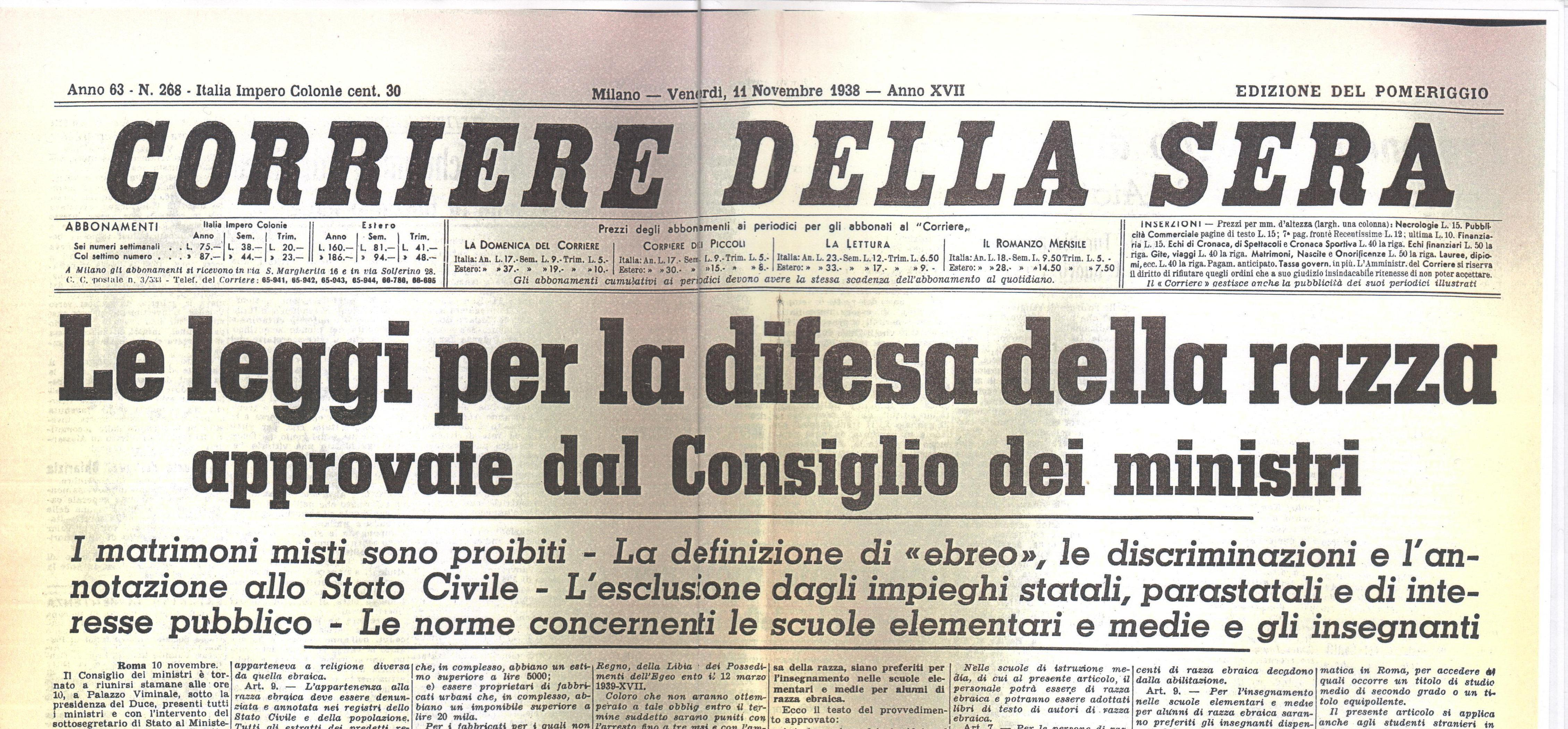
Front page of the Italian newspaper Corriere della Sera on 11 November 1938: "Le leggi per la difesa della razza approvate dal Consiglio dei ministri" (English: "The laws for the defence of race approved by the Council of Ministers"). On the same day, the Racial Laws entered into force under the Italian Fascist regime, enacting the racial discrimination and persecution of Italian Jews.

The Italian racial laws, otherwise referred to as the Racial Laws (Italian: Leggi Razziali), were a series of laws promulgated by the government of Benito Mussolini in Fascist Italy from 1938 to 1944 in order to enforce racial discrimination and segregation in the Kingdom of Italy. The main victims of the Racial Laws were Italian Jews and the African inhabitants of the Italian Empire.

In the aftermath of Mussolini's fall from power and the invasion of Italy by Nazi Germany, the Badoglio government suppressed the laws in January 1944. In northern Italy, they remained in force and were made more severe in the territories ruled by the Italian Social Republic until the end of the Second World War.

== History ==
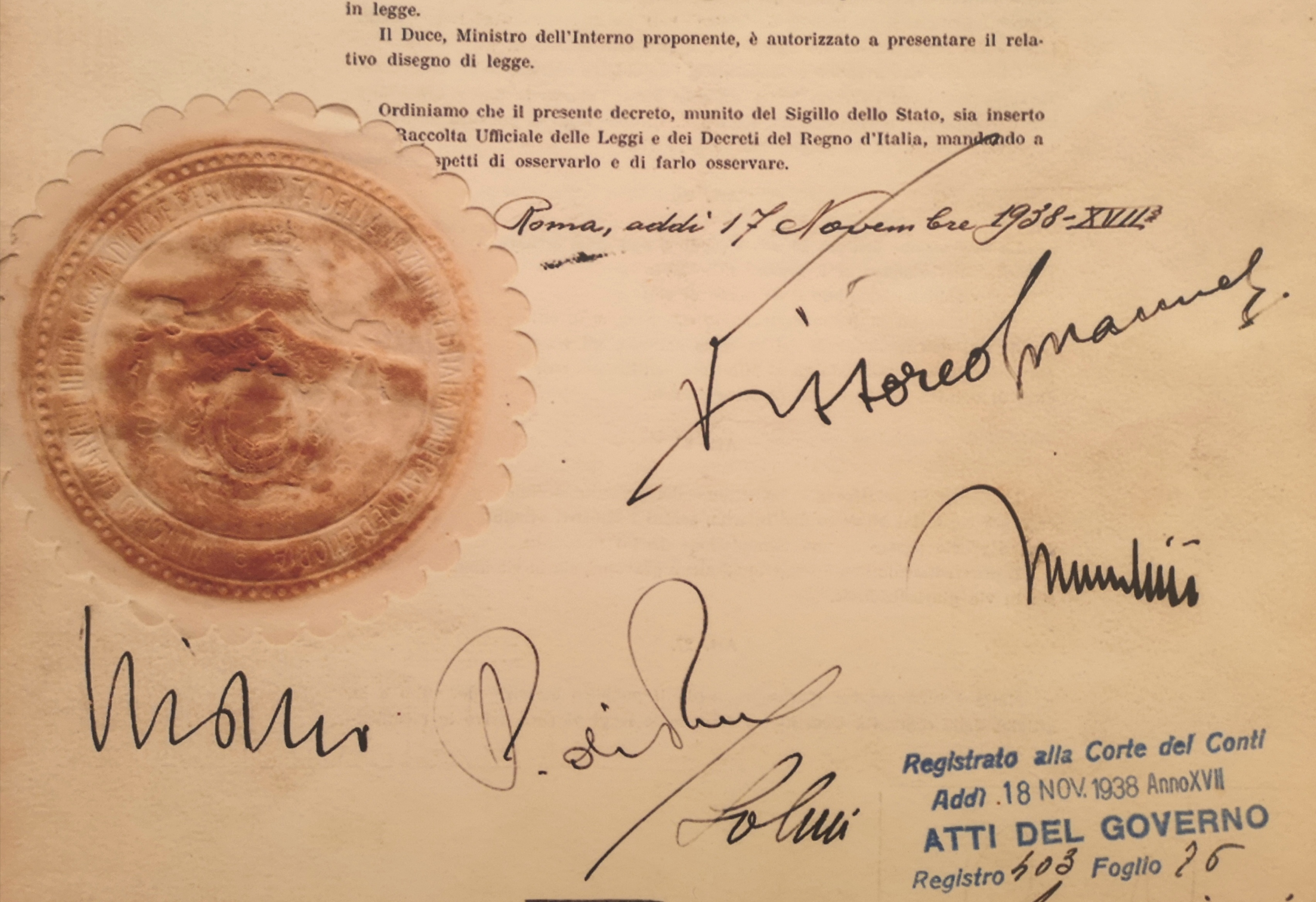
The signatures of Victor Emmanuel III, Mussolini, Justice Minister Arrigo Solmi, Paolo Thaon di Revel and Galeazzo Ciano on the Regio Decreto 17 Novembre 1938, Nr. 1728

The first and most important of the Racial Laws (Leggi Razziali) was the Regio Decreto 17 Novembre 1938, Nr. 1728. It restricted the civil rights of Italian Jews, banned books written by Jewish authors, and excluded Jews from public offices and higher education. Additional laws stripped Jews of their assets, restricted travel, and finally, provided for their confinement in internal exile, as was done for political prisoners. In recognition of both their past and future contributions and for their service as subjects of the Italian Empire, Rome passed a decree in 1937 distinguishing the Eritreans and Ethiopians from other subjects of the newly-founded colonial empire. In the Kingdom of Italy, Eritreans and Ethiopians were to be addressed as "Africans" and not as natives, as was the case with the other African peoples subjected to the colonial rule of the Italian Empire.

The promulgation of the Racial Laws was preceded by a long press campaign and publication of the "Manifesto of Race" earlier in 1938, a purportedly-scientific report signed by scientists and supporters of the National Fascist Party (PNF); among the 180 signers of the "Manifesto of Race" were two medical doctors (S. Visco and N. Fende), an anthropologist (L. Cipriani), a zoologist (E. Zavattari), and a statistician (F. Savorgnan). The "Manifesto of Race", published in July 1938, declared the Italians to be descendants of the Aryan race. It targeted races that were seen as inferior (i.e. not of Aryan descent). In particular, Jews were banned from many professions. Under the Racial Laws, sexual relations and marriages between Italians, Jews, and Africans were forbidden. Jews were banned from positions in banking, government, and education, as well as having their properties confiscated.

The final decision about the Racial Laws was made during the meeting of the Gran Consiglio del Fascismo, which took place on the night between 6 and 7 of October 1938 in Rome, Palazzo Venezia. Not all Italian Fascists supported discrimination: while the pro-German, anti-Jewish Roberto Farinacci and Giovanni Preziosi strongly pushed for them, Italo Balbo strongly opposed the Racial Laws. Balbo, in particular, regarded antisemitism as having nothing to do with fascism and staunchly opposed the antisemitic laws. The Racial Laws prohibited Jews from most professional positions as well as prohibited sexual relations and marriages between Italians, Jews, and Africans. The press in Fascist Italy highly publicized the "Manifesto of Race", which included a mixture of biological racism and history; it declared that Italians belonged to the Aryan race, Jews were not Italians, and that it was necessary to distinguish between Europeans and non-Europeans.

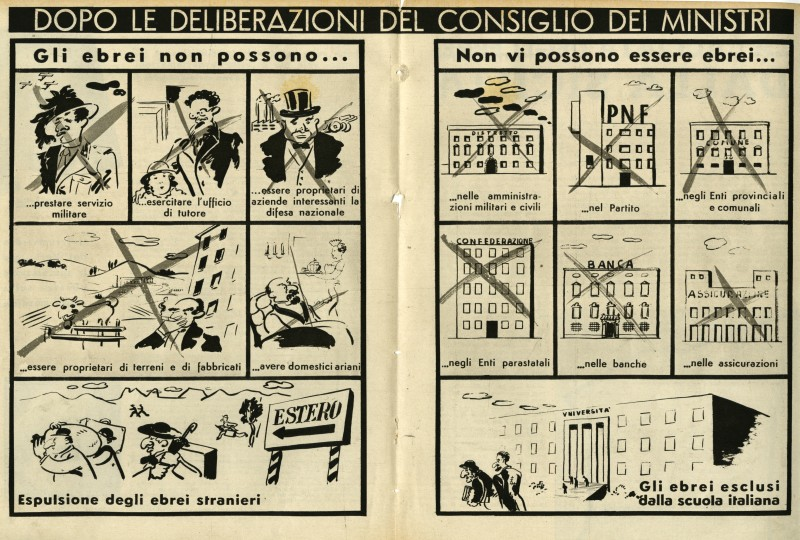
Antisemitic cartoon published in the Fascist periodical La Difesa della Razza, after the promulgation of the Racial Laws (15 November 1938)

While some scholars argue that this was an attempt by Mussolini to placate Adolf Hitler, who increasingly exerted influence over Mussolini in the late 1930s and is speculated to have pressured him to increase the racial discrimination and persecution of Jews in the Kingdom of Italy, others believe that it reflected sentiments long entrenched not just in Fascist political philosophy but also in the teachings of the post-Tridentine Catholic Church, which remained a powerful cultural force in Mussolini's Fascist regime, representing a uniquely Italian flavour of antisemitism in which Jews were seen as an obstacle to the Fascist transformation of Italian society due to being bound to what Mussolini saw as decadent liberal democracies.

Il Tevere, an Italian Fascist newspaper founded by Mussolini and directed by Telesio Interlandi, frequently promoted antisemitism and railed against the alleged threat of "international Jewry". It was a frequent source of praise for Adolf Hitler's antisemitic policies until its disbandment after the fall of Mussolini and the Fascist regime on 25 July 1943. In the aftermath of Mussolini's fall from power and the following German occupation of Italy, the Badoglio government abolished the Racial Laws in the Kingdom of Italy through two royal law decrees passed in January 1944. They remained enforced and were made more severe in the territories ruled by the Italian Social Republic (1943–1945) until the end of the Second World War.

== Criticism and unpopularity ==
Leading members of the National Fascist Party (PNF), such as Dino Grandi and Italo Balbo, reportedly opposed the Racial Laws, and the laws were unpopular with most Italian citizens; the Jews were a small minority in Italy and had integrated deeply into Italian society and culture over the course of several centuries.

Most Jews in Italy were either descendants of the ancient Italian Jews that practiced the Italian rite and had been living in the Italian Peninsula since Ancient Roman times; Western Sephardic Jews who had migrated to Italy from the Iberian Peninsula after the Reconquista and promulgation of the Alhambra Decree in the 1490s; and a smaller portion of Ashkenazi Jewish communities that settled in Northern Italy during the Middle Ages, which had largely assimilated into the established Italian-rite Jewish and Sephardic communities. Most Italians were not widely acquainted with the Jewish population, and Italian society was unaccustomed to the kind of antisemitism that had been relatively common and thrived for centuries in German-speaking countries and other regions of Northern, Northwestern, and Eastern Europe, where Jews had more presence and lived in large numbers for a long period of time.

During the years of Benito Mussolini's dictatorship prior to 1938, there had not been any race laws promulgated in the Kingdom of Italy. The Racial Laws were introduced at the same time as Fascist Italy began to ally itself with Nazi Germany, and mere months before Fascist Italy would form the Pact of Steel, which signed the military alliance between the two countries. William Shirer in The Rise and Fall of the Third Reich suggests that Mussolini enacted the Racial Laws in order to appease his German allies, rather than to satisfy any genuine antisemitic sentiment among the Italian people.

Indeed, prior to 1938 and the Pact of Steel alliance, Mussolini and many notable Italian Fascists had been highly critical of Nordicism, biological racism, and antisemitism, especially the virulent and violent antisemitism and biological racism that could be found in the ideology of Nazi Germany. Many early supporters of Italian fascism, including Mussolini's mistress, the writer and socialite Margherita Sarfatti, were in fact middle-class or upper middle-class Italian Jews. Nordicism and biological racism were often considered incompatible with the early ideology of Italian fascism; Nordicism inherently subordinated the Italians themselves and other Mediterranean peoples beneath the Germans and Northwestern Europeans in its proposed racial hierarchy, and early Italian Fascists, including Mussolini, viewed race as a cultural and political invention rather than a biological reality.

In 1929, Mussolini noted that Italian Jews had been a demographically small yet culturally integral part of Italian society since Ancient Rome. His views on Italian Jews were consistent with his early Mediterraneanist perspective, which suggested that all Mediterranean cultures, including the Jewish culture, shared a common bond. He further argued that Italian Jews had truly become "Italians" or natives to Italy after living for such a long period in the Italian Peninsula. However, Mussolini's views on race were often contradictory and quick to change when necessary, and as Fascist Italy became increasingly subordinate to Nazi Germany's interests, Mussolini began adopting openly racial theories borrowed from or based on Nazi racial policies, leading to the introduction of the antisemitic Racial Laws.

Historian Federico Chabod argued that the introduction of the Nordicist-influenced Racial Laws was a large factor in the decrease of public support among Italians for Fascist Italy, and many Italians viewed the Racial Laws as an obvious imposition or intrusion of German values into Italian culture, and a sign that Mussolini's power and the Fascist regime were collapsing under Nazi German influence.

== See also ==
- An Investigation of Global Policy with the Yamato Race as Nucleus
- Antisemitism in 21st-century Italy
- "Fascist Manifesto"
- History of the Jews in Italy
- Italian fascism and racism
- Italian war crimes
- Lebensraum
- "Manifesto of Race"
- Mediterranean race
- Nazi racial theories
- Nuremberg Laws
- Race Life of the Aryan Peoples
- Racism in Italy
- Racial policy of Nazi Germany
- The Garden of the Finzi-Continis
- The Holocaust in Italy
- Three Aspects of the Jewish Problem

== Bibliography ==
- De Felice, Renzo (1993). Storia degli ebrei italiani sotto il fascismo (in Italian) (4 ed.). Turin: Einaudi. ISBN 8806172794.
- Bianco, Giovanni (2016), Razzismi contemporanei, in: Rivista critica del diritto privato, Esi, Napoli, n. 2/2016, ISSN 1123-1025
- Burgio, Alberto (2002), Nel nome della razza. Il razzismo nella storia d'Italia, Il Mulino, Bologna,ISBN 88-15-07200-4
- Centro Furio Jesi (a cura di) (1994), La menzogna della razza. Documenti e immagini del razzismo e dell'antisemitismo fascista, Grafis, Bologna, ISBN 888081009X
- Michael A. Livingston: The Fascists and the Jews of Italy – Mussolini´s Race Laws, 1938–1943. Cambridge University Press, 2014, ISBN 978-1-107-02756-5.
- Furio Moroni: Italy: Aspects of the Unbeautiful Life. In: Avi Beker: The Plunder of Jewish Property during the Holocaust. Palgrave, 2001, ISBN 0-333-76064-6.
- Michele Sarfatti: Characteristics and Objectives of the Anti-Jewish Racial Laws in Fascist Italy, 1938-1943. In: Joshua D. Zimmerman: Jews in Italy under Fascist and Nazi Rule, 1922–1945. Cambridge University Press, 2005, ISBN 0-521-84101-1.
