= Telesio =

Telesio may refer to:

- Bernardino Telesio (1509–1588), Italian philosopher and natural scientist
- Telesio Interlandi (1894–1965), Italian journalist and anti-semitic propagandist
- 11278 Telesio, a main-belt asteroid named after Bernardino Telesio
