= Pietro Egidi =

Italian historian (1872–1929)

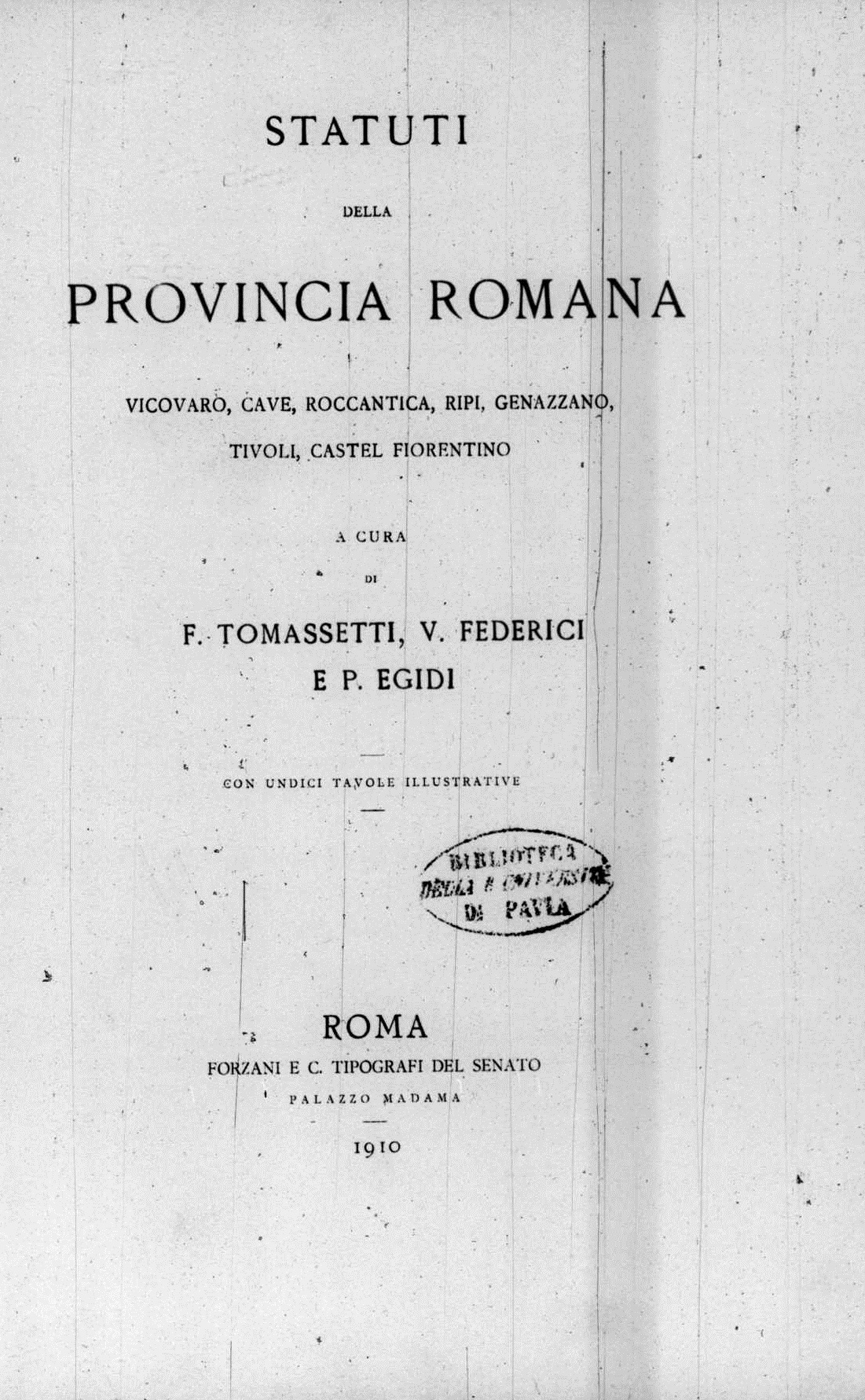

Pietro Egidi (6 December 1872 – 1 August 1929) was an Italian historian who specialized in Medieval history.

== Biography ==
Pietro Egidi was born in Viterbo and graduated in 1892 from the Università di Roma. He obtained numerous teaching positions in Italy. From 1904 to 1912, he taught at the Technical Institute of Naples. In 1912, he was docent extraordinary teaching modern history at the University of Messina. In 1915, he was appointed to teach the same at the University of Turin. He was a member of numerous Italian learned societies. He served as director of the prominent journal Rivista Storica Italiana from 1923 to 1929. He died suddenly in 1929, while on vacation in Courmayeur.

One of his pupils in Turin was Federico Chabod.

== Works ==
Among Egidi's works are:

- Codice diplomatico dei Saraceni di Lucera (Diplomatic Codicils of the Saracens of Lucera) (1917)
- I moti studenteschi di Torino nel gennaio 1821 (1922)
- Bibliographic guide to Medieval History (1922)
- Carlo I d'Angiò e l'abbazia di S. Maria della Vittoria presso Scurcola (Charles I d'Anjou and the Abbey of Santa Maria della Vittoria near Scurcola) (1910)
- La communitas Siciliae del 1282 (1915)

== Bibliography ==
- Pisano, Rossano (1993). "EGIDI, Pietro". Dizionario Biografico degli Italiani (in Italian). Vol. 42: Dugoni–Enza. Rome: Istituto dell'Enciclopedia Italiana. ISBN 978-88-12-00032-6.
