= Manifesto of Race =

Italian Fascist racial manifesto, promulgated in 1938

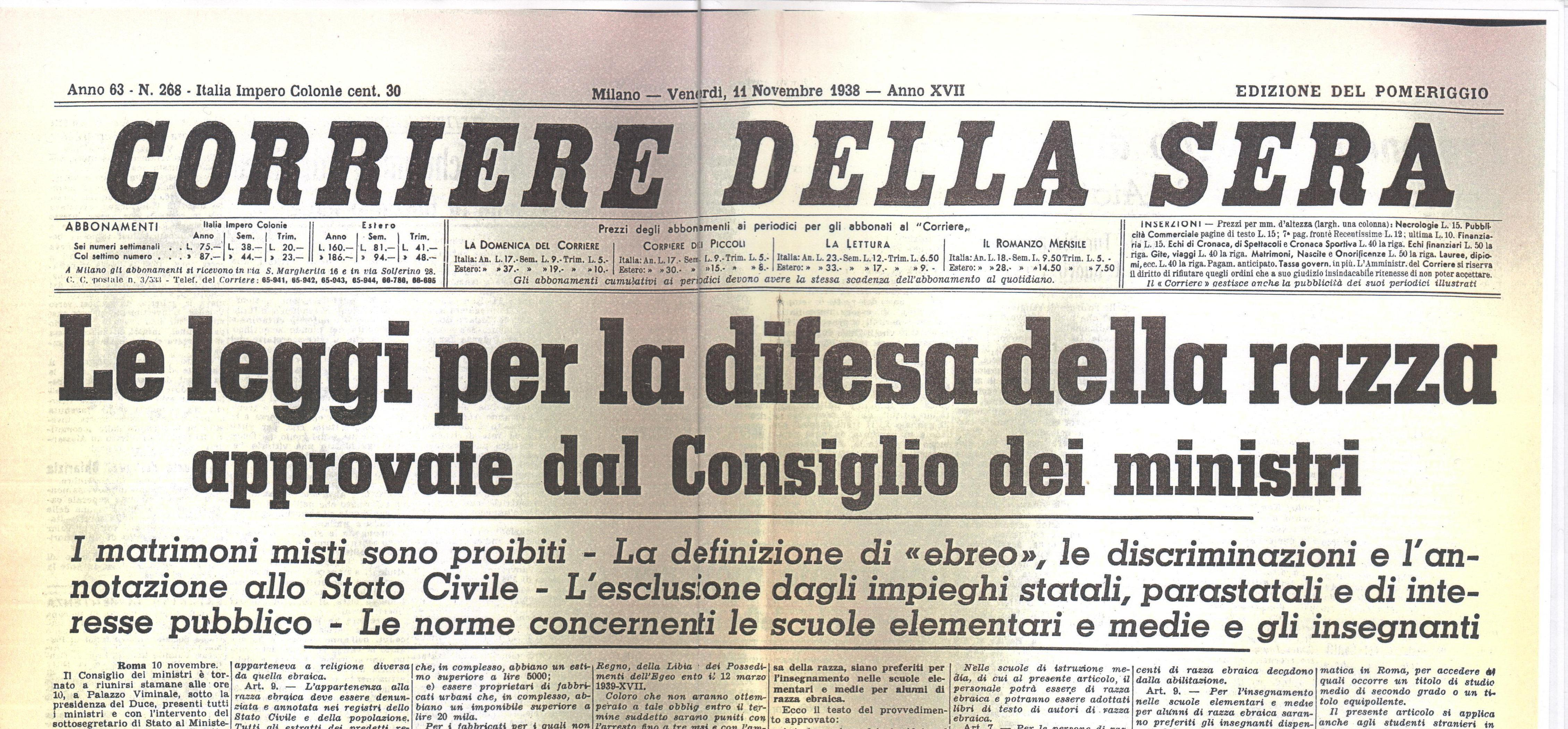
Front page of the Italian newspaper Corriere della Sera on 11 November 1938: "Le leggi per la difesa della razza approvate dal Consiglio dei ministri" (English: "The laws for the defence of race approved by the Council of Ministers"). On the same day, the Racial Laws entered into force under the Italian Fascist regime, enacting the racial discrimination and persecution of Italian Jews.

The "Manifesto of Race" (Italian: Manifesto della razza), otherwise referred to as the Charter of Race or the Racial Manifesto, was an Italian manifesto promulgated by the government of Benito Mussolini on 14 July 1938. Its promulgation was followed by the enactment, in October 1938, of the Racial Laws in Fascist Italy and the Italian Empire.

The antisemitic laws barred all Jews from government posts and several professional fields, and revoked Italian citizenship for foreign-born Jews who had acquired it after World War I. The manifesto demonstrated the substantial influence of Adolf Hitler over Benito Mussolini since Fascist Italy's growing relations with Nazi Germany, following the Second Italo-Ethiopian War. Mussolini had earlier issued statements ridiculing especially the racial policies and theories of the Nazi Party (NSDAP), and highly contradictory statements regarding antisemitism and Italian Jews, many of which had supported the National Fascist Party (PNF) earlier throughout the dictatorship. Starting with the manifesto, the National Fascist Party took a course considerably more in line with the ideology of German Nazism.

== History ==
Prior to 1938 there had not been any race laws promulgated in the Kingdom of Italy during the Fascist regime. Mussolini had held the view that a small contingent of Italian Jews had lived in Italy "since the days of the Kings of Rome" (a reference to the Benè Romi, or Italian-rite Jews) and should "remain undisturbed". There were even some Jews in the National Fascist Party, such as Ettore Ovazza who in 1935 founded the Jewish Fascist paper La Nostra Bandiera. Among the 180 signers of the "Manifesto of Race" were two medical doctors (S. Visco and N. Fende), an anthropologist (L. Cipriani), a zoologist (E. Zavattari), and a statistician (F. Savorgnan).

In recognition of both their past and future contributions and for their service as subjects of the Italian Empire since the 1880s, Rome passed a decree in 1937 distinguishing Eritreans from Ethiopians and other subjects of the newly-founded colonial empire in a divide-and-conquer fashion. In the Kingdom of Italy, Eritreans were to be addressed as "Africans" and not as "natives", as was the case with Ethiopian peoples subjected to the colonial rule of the Italian Empire from 1936 onwards. The "Manifesto of Race", published in July 1938, declared the Italians to be descendants of the Aryan race. It targeted races that were seen as inferior (i.e. not of Aryan descent). In particular, Jews were banned from many professions. Under the Racial Laws of 1938–1943, sexual relations and marriages between Italians, Jews, and Africans were forbidden. Jews were banned from positions in banking, government, and education, as well as having their properties confiscated.

On 13 July 1938, the Kingdom of Italy promulgated a publication mistitled "Manifesto of the Racial Scientists" which mixed biological racism with history; it declared that Italy was a country populated by people of Aryan origin, that Italians belonged to the Aryan race, that Jews did not belong to the Italian race, and that it was necessary to distinguish between Europeans and Semites, Hamites, black Africans, and other non-Europeans. The manifesto encouraged Italians to be racist. The press and periodicals in Fascist Italy often published material that showed caricatures of Jews and Africans. However, even after the promulgation of the Racial Laws, Mussolini continued to make contradictory statements about race. After the fall of Mussolini and the Fascist regime on 25 July 1943, the Badoglio government suppressed the Racial Laws. They remained enforced and were made more severe in the territories ruled by the Italian Social Republic (1943–1945) until the end of the Second World War.

== Motivations ==
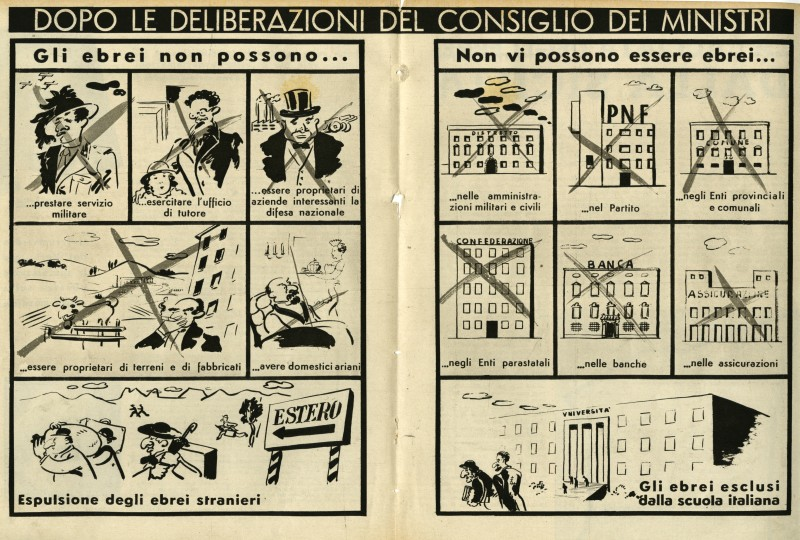
Antisemitic cartoon published in the Fascist periodical La Difesa della Razza, after the promulgation of the Racial Laws (15 November 1938)

The Italo-German alliance was greatly bound by the two countries' shared political philosophy of fascism as a form of "progressive reaction" against the modern world—both Mussolini and Hitler despised modern-style humanistic liberal democracy, but lauded their own ideas of fascism as the fulfillment of modern politics and the embodiment of the popular will. Hitler was captivated and personally inspired by the 1922 March on Rome and envisioned himself at the head of a similar march on Berlin. Thus, Mussolini increasingly decided to harmonize Italian Fascism with German Nazism by introducing antisemitic laws in Italy as evidence of his good faith towards Hitler. He conceived it, at least partially and tactically, as an offering calculated to solidify the Italo-German alliance. In Italian Fascist literature and periodicals, a shift toward a less refined racism, accentuating the biological, Indo-European element occurred, emphasizing the ancient Latins and Romans as a nucleus of warlike Aryans closely related to the Celts and other Indo-European ethnic groups; therefore, Italian Fascist nationalism merged with the doctrine of Aryan racism.

After considerable resistance, Nazi influence began to penetrate some intellectual circles in the Kingdom of Italy. In general, however, there was a concerted effort to distinguish Fascist "racism", allegedly of "culturalist" variety, from that emanating from the Germanic realm. Giovanni Gentile, for example, despised the introduction of biological racism into Italian Fascism, and the same can be said of the majority of the early theoreticians of intellectual Fascism. Yet the concern for a corporate national identity, as opposed to what Gentile called the "solipsist ego" enshrined by demo-liberal politics, was always part of the Italian Fascist worldview. In any case, it was not unusual for Fascist intellectuals to oppose themselves to the more excessive and irrational components of Ariosophy, before the outbreak of World War II.

== Criticism and unpopularity ==
For the most part, the Racial Laws were met with disapproval from not just ordinary Italian citizens but also members of the National Fascist Party themselves. On one occasion, an Italian Fascist scholar questioned Mussolini over the treatment his Jewish friends were receiving after the promulgation of the Racial Laws, which prompted Mussolini to say: "I agree with you entirely. I don't believe a bit in the stupid anti-Semitic theory. I am carrying out my policy entirely for political reasons." William Shirer in The Rise and Fall of the Third Reich suggests that Mussolini enacted the Racial Laws in order to appease his German allies, rather than to satisfy any genuine anti-Semitic sentiment among the Italian people.

Indeed, prior to 1938 and the Pact of Steel alliance, Mussolini and many notable Italian Fascists had been highly critical of Nordicism, biological racism, and antisemitism, especially the virulent and violent antisemitism and biological racism that could be found in the ideology of Nazi Germany. Many early supporters of Italian fascism, including Mussolini's mistress, the writer and socialite Margherita Sarfatti, were in fact middle-class or upper middle-class Italian Jews. Nordicism and biological racism were often considered incompatible with the early ideology of Italian fascism; Nordicism inherently subordinated the Italians themselves and other Mediterranean peoples beneath the Germans and Northwestern Europeans in its proposed racial hierarchy, and early Italian Fascists, including Mussolini, viewed race as a cultural and political invention rather than a biological reality.

In 1929, Mussolini noted that Italian Jews had been a demographically small yet culturally integral part of Italian society since Ancient Rome. His views on Italian Jews were consistent with his early Mediterraneanist perspective, which suggested that all Mediterranean cultures, including the Jewish culture, shared a common bond. He further argued that Italian Jews had truly become "Italians" or natives to Italy after living for such a long period in the Italian Peninsula. However, Mussolini's views on race were often contradictory and quick to change when necessary, and as Fascist Italy became increasingly subordinate to Nazi Germany's interests, Mussolini began adopting openly racial theories borrowed from or based on Nazi racial policies, leading to the introduction of the antisemitic Racial Laws. Historian Federico Chabod argued that the introduction of the Nordicist-influenced Racial Laws was a large factor in the decrease of public support among Italians for Fascist Italy, and many Italians viewed the Racial Laws as an obvious imposition or intrusion of German values into Italian culture, and a sign that Mussolini's power and the Fascist regime were collapsing under Nazi German influence.

== See also ==
- The Holocaust in Italy
- An Investigation of Global Policy with the Yamato Race as Nucleus
- Lebensraum
- Nazi racial theories
- Nuremberg Laws
