= Mediterraneanism =

Ideology of commonality between Mediterranean cultures

Mediterraneanism is a racialist ideology that claims that the "Mediterranean race" (a historical race concept) is "the greatest race... derived neither from the black nor white people... an autonomous stock in the human family" according to Mediterraneanist and anthropologist Giuseppe Sergi. Sergi identified the Mediterranean race as a brunet race separate from the black race and the white race.

Mediterraneanism was in stark contrast to and was partially a reaction to the then-popular Nordicist racial theory common in North America and Northwestern, Central, Germanic-speaking, and Northern Europe that claimed Mediterranean people were inferior to the supposed Nordic race.

== History ==
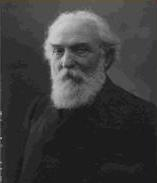
Giuseppe Sergi

Sergi claimed that the Mediterranean race was "the greatest race in the world". He defined it as "the finest brunet race which has appeared in North Africa…derived neither from the black nor white peoples, but constitut[ing] an autonomous stock in the human family.". Sergi claimed that the Mediterranean Race probably historically spoke a Hamitic language related to the language of the prehistoric Egyptians, Iberians, and Libyans. Sergi noted that the Roman Empire led to the spread of Mediterranean civilization across Europe and thus contemporary European civilization was bound by ancestry to the Mediterranean race.

Sergi rejected Nordicism's claims of Nordic peoples being strongly Aryan, saying that Aryans were not Nordic in appearance. Instead he claimed that Nordics were "Aryanized Euroafricans", and that the Nordic race is related to Mediterranean race. Sergi responded to typical Nordicist claims of superiority of Nordics over Mediterraneans, by saying that the reason for the perceived lack of wealth or progress in Romance-speaking countries as compared with countries of Northern Europe was because the Aryans of the North, living in frigid climates had developed close-knit groups that allowed them to survive in that environment, as such they became more disciplined, productive civic-minded than southern Europeans. However Sergi rejected claims that Aryans who were a Euroasian people were responsible for founding Greco-Latin civilization. Sergi described the original Aryans in Europe in a negative manner: "The Aryans were savages when they invaded Europe: they destroyed in part the superior civilization of the Neolithic populations, and could not have created the Greco-Latin civilization". Sergi claimed that the only contribution by the ancient Aryans to European civilization was Indo-European languages.

Sergi claimed the Nordics had made no substantial contribution to pre-modern civilization, noting that "in the epoch of Tacitus, the Germans ... remained barbarians as in prehistoric times". He claimed that the Romans were unable to Romanize the Germans because the Germans were averse to the Romans' civilizing influence. He rejected Germanic scholars' claims that Germans were the saviors of a decadent post-Roman Italy. Instead Sergi claimed that the Germans were responsible for bringing forward the Dark Ages in the Medieval period and that the Germans of the Medieval period were known for "delinquency, vagabondage, and ferocity". C. G. Seligman supported Mediterraneanist claims, stating "it must, I think, be recognized that the Mediterranean race has actually more achievement to its credit than any other, since it is responsible for by far the greater part of Mediterranean civilization, certainly before 1000 B.C. (and probably much later), and so shaped not only the Aegean cultures, but those of Western as well as the greater part of Eastern Mediterranean lands, while the culture of their near relatives, the Hamitic pre-dynastic Egyptians, formed the basis of that of Egypt."

The French historian Fernand Braudel in the 1920s invoked the conception of the Mediterraneanism including claims of Mediterranean universalism to justify French colonialism in Algeria. Braudel had entered his doctrinal studies in the 1920s at the precise time when the issue of Mediterranean unity was being fiercely debated. Braudel supported the pro-unity argument. The argument for Mediterranean unity justified French colonialism in Algeria and viewed the Berbers in a place of privilege amongst the peoples of Africa, as retainers of the lost Roman legacy in Africa. It was claimed that if the Berbers could be culturally separated from the Arabo-Islamic surrounding culture, that the Berbers would become natural allies of the French through their Mediterranean heritage that would challenge anti-colonial sentiment.

== Italian Fascist conception ==
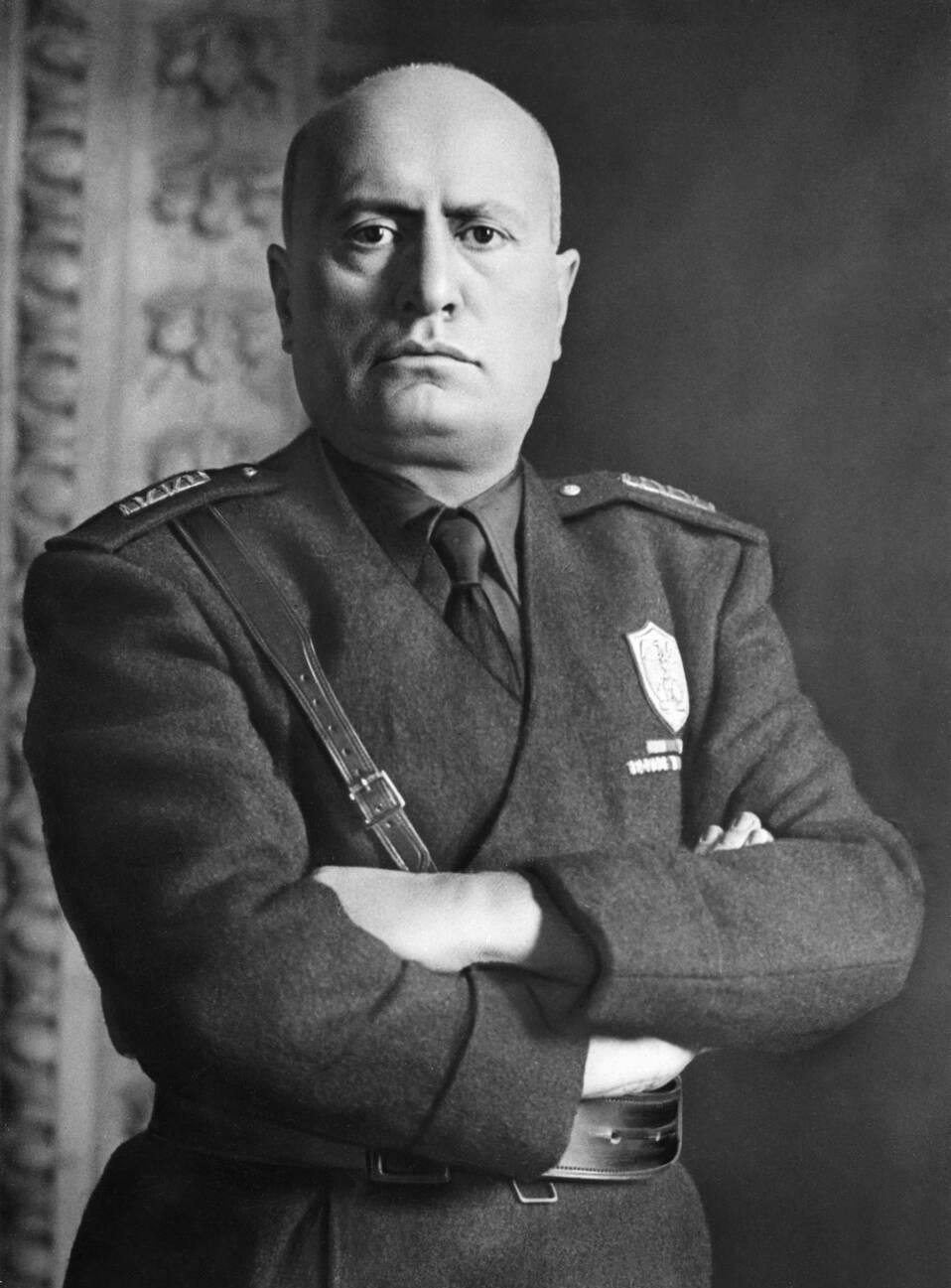
Benito Mussolini was initially a strong proponent of Mediterraneanism; however, following his increasing allegiance towards Nazi Germany and the subsequent influence of pro-Nordicist Nazism on his policies, he began to promote pro-Nordic Aryanism and suggested that Italians had Nordic-Mediterranean heritage.

At first, Italian Fascism promoted a variant of Mediterraneanism that, like Sergi's strain of Mediterraneanism, held that Mediterranean people and cultures shared a common historical and cultural bond. Initially, this variant mostly avoided explicit racial connotations; its followers often rejected biological racism and instead stressed the importance of the cultural aspects rather than the racial aspects of the Mediterranean peoples. Implicitly, however, this form of Mediterraneanism posited the Mediterranean race and Mediterranean cultures as superior to Northwestern and "Nordic" European groups, including the Northwestern European, Germanic, and Nordic people. This "defensive" form of Mediterraneanism arose mostly as a response to the then-popular theory of Nordicism, a racial theory popular at the time among Northwestern European and Germanic racial theorists, as well as racial theorists of Northwestern European descent in countries such as the United States, that viewed non-Nordic people, including some Italians and other Mediterranean people, as racially subordinate to the Nordic, Aryan, or Germanic peoples.

In a 1921 speech in Bologna, Benito Mussolini stated that "Fascism was born... out of a profound, perennial need of this our Aryan and Mediterranean race". In this speech Mussolini was referring to Italians as being the Mediterranean branch of the Indo-European Aryan race, in the sense of people of an Indo-European heritage rather than in the more famous Nordicist sense that was promoted by the Nazis. Italian Fascism emphasized that race was bound by spiritual and cultural foundations, and identified a racial hierarchy based on spiritual and cultural factors. Mussolini explicitly rejected notions that biologically "pure" races existed in modern times.

In 1929, Mussolini asserted that Jewish culture was Mediterranean and that Jews were native to Italy, after living there for a long time. He also praised their contributions to Italy despite their minority status.

Italian Fascism strongly rejected the Nordicist and Nazi conception of the Aryan race that idealized "pure" Aryans as having certain physical traits that were defined as Nordic such as fair skin, or blond hair, traits uncommon among Mediterranean and Italian people and the often olive-skinned members of the so-called "Mediterranean race". The antipathy by Mussolini and other Italian Fascists to Nordicism was over the existence of such theories by German and Anglo-Saxon Nordicists who viewed Mediterranean peoples as racially degenerate. Both Nordicism and biological racism were often considered incompatible with the early Italian fascist philosophy at the time; Nordicism inherently subordinated Italians and other Mediterranean people beneath the Germans and Northwestern Europeans in its proposed racial hierarchy, and early Italian fascists, including Mussolini, often viewed race as a cultural and political invention rather than a biological reality or saw physical race as something that could be overcome through culture. In a speech given in Bari in 1934, Mussolini reiterated his attitude toward Nordicism: "Thirty centuries of history allow us to look with supreme pity on certain doctrines which are preached beyond the Alps by the descendants of those who were illiterate when Rome had Caesar, Virgil and Augustus".

=== Nazi German influence and Nordic-Mediterraneanism ===
From the late 1930s through World War II, the Italian Fascists became divided in their stance on Mediterraneanism. Originally, Nazi-like Nordicist racial theories were found among only a small number of fringe Italian Fascists, mostly Germanophiles, anti-Semites, anti-intellectuals, and Northern Italians who regarded themselves to have Germanic Lombard racial heritage; among most other Italian Fascists, Nordicism and "Nazi Aryanism" remained at odds with Italian Fascist theories on the greatness of the Mediterranean people. However, by 1938, as the alliance between Fascist Italy and Nazi Germany became stronger, and as Nazi German policies and theories increasingly influenced Italian Fascist thought, many Italian Fascists began to embrace a new form of Mediterraneanism, a variant that mixed Nazi Nordicism with original Mediterraneanism. Unlike other forms of Mediterraneanism, this form based its racial view on Nazism and asserted that Italians were part of the "white race" or "white Aryan race" and utilized white supremacism to justify colonialism.

In 1938, mere months before creating the Pact of Steel alliance with Nazi Germany, the Fascist Italian government created the Italian Racial Laws and officially but gradually recognized and embraced the racial myth of Italians having Nordic heritage and being of Nordic-Mediterranean descent. According to the Diary of Giuseppe Bottai, in a meeting with Fascist Party members, Mussolini declared that previous policy of focus on Mediterraneanism was to be replaced by a focus on Aryanism. Both Italian historian Renzo De Felice in his book La storia degli ebrei italiani sotto il fascismo (1961) and William Shirer in The Rise and Fall of the Third Reich (1960) suggest that Mussolini enacted the Italian Racial Laws and turned towards Nazi racial theories partially to appease his Nazi German allies, rather than to satisfy a genuine anti-Semitic sentiment among the Italian people.

With the rise in influence of pro-Nordicist Nazi Germany in Europe, and as the Fascist Italian regime sought unity with Nazi Germany, the Fascist regime gave previously-fringe Italian Nordicists prominent positions in the National Fascist Party (PNF), which aggravated the original Mediterraneanists in the party. Prominent (and previously fringe) Nordicists such as Julius Evola rejected Mediterraneanism and, in particular, Evola denounced Sergi's association of Southern Europeans with Northern Africans as "dangerous". Evola rejected biological determinism for race but was a supporter of spiritual Nordicism. In direct contradiction of the earlier or original forms of Mediterraneanism that embraced the idea of a shared origin or culture among all people of the Mediterranean, the Manifesto of Racial Scientists (1938) declared that Mediterranean Europeans were distinct from Mediterranean Africans and Mediterranean Asians and rejected claims that European Mediterraneans were related to the Mediterranean Semitic or Hamitic peoples.

In 1941, the PNF's Mediterraneanists, through the influence of Giacomo Acerbo, put forward a comprehensive definition of the Italian race. However these efforts were challenged by Mussolini's endorsement of Nordicist figures with the appointment of staunch spiritual Nordicist Alberto Luchini as head of Italy's Racial Office in May 1941, as well as with Mussolini becoming interested with Evola's spiritual Nordicism in late 1941. Acerbo and the Mediterraneanists in his High Council on Demography and Race sought to bring the regime back to supporting Mediterraneanism by thoroughly denouncing the pro-Nordicist Manifesto of the Racial Scientists. The Council recognized Aryans as being a linguistic-based group, and condemned the Manifesto for denying the influence of pre-Aryan civilization on modern Italy, saying that the Manifesto "constitutes an unjustifiable and undemonstrable negation of the anthropological, ethnological, and archaeological discoveries that have occurred and are occurring in our country". Furthermore, the Council denounced the Manifesto for "implicitly" crediting Germanic invaders of Italy in the guise of the Lombards for having "a formative influence on the Italian race in a disproportional degree to the number of invaders and to their biological predominance". The High Council claimed that the obvious superiority of the ancient Greeks and Romans in comparison with the ancient Germanic tribes made it inconceivable that Italian culture owed a debt to ancient Germans.

== See also ==
- Aryanism
- History of the Mediterranean region
- Mediterranean race
- Nordicism
- Olive skin
- Race
