= Edoardo Zavattari =

Italian zoologist

Edoardo Zavattari (21 October 1883, Tortona – 17 February 1972) (born 21 October 1883 in Tortona, in the province of Alexandria, in Piedmont and died on 17 February 1972 in Genoa) was an Italian zoologist who was a director at the Institute of Zoology in the Sapienza University of Rome from 1935 to 1953. He supported fascism and antisemitism on the basis of his ideas from biology and was a signatory to the "Manifesto della Razza".

== Biography ==
His first academic role was as a professor at the University of Pavia and then at the University of Rome, Edoardo Zavattari was the author of more than 300 scientific publications. Between 1926 and 1959, he made several expeditions, visiting all the continents for research, in particular in the North-Eastern Africa. The specimens he collected, were placed into 122 packages, two of which are now part of the collection of the Museo Civico di Zoologia in Rome. In particular, he published Prodromo della fauna della Libia (1934).

While he was director of the Institute of Zoology in the Capitoline Athenaeum from 1935 to 1958, the Institute's work on animal systematics was revived.

In the 1920s and 1930s Zavattari was a supporter of the regime of Benito Mussolini and the National Fascist Party and their theories on biological racism. In 1928, at the inauguration of the academic year at the University of Pavia, he pronounced himself for a strict separation between "superior race and dominated race". In 1938, he was one of the ten signatories of the Manifesto of racist scientists whose text, enriched by Guido Landra but conceived and modified by Mussolini, was presented as the founding act of the fascists' racial laws. Zavattari wrote several articles in the magazine La Difesa della Razza, which was edited by the extreme antisemite, Telesio Interlandi.

Zavattari was a member of the Italian Entomological Society (Società Entomologica Italiana) for more than thirty years (from 1937 to 1969) and was a member of the National Academy of Sciences (Accademia nazionale delle scienza) from 1951.

== Writings ==
- Zavattari, Edoardo (1940) Ambiente naturale e caratteri razziali. La Difesa della razza 3(9):49.
- Zavattari, Edoardo (1938) Politica ed etica razziale. Vita Universitaria. 3.
- Zavattari, Edoardo (1937) "Le basi biologiche di faschmo. Critica medico-sociale, no. 6:21-18.
