= Renzo De Felice =

Italian historian (1929–1996)

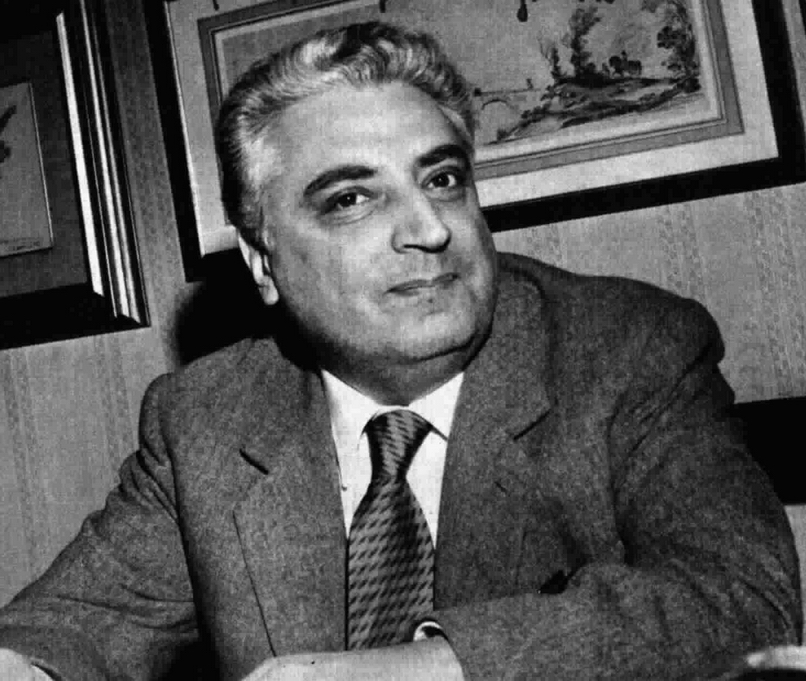
- Born: 8 April 1929; Rieti, Kingdom of Italy
- Died: 25 May 1996 (aged 67); Rome, Republic of Italy
- Education: Sapienza University of Rome
- Occupations: Historian, writer
- Spouse: Livia De Ruggiero
- Writing career
- Genre: History
- Subjects: Benito Mussolini, Italian fascism and Jacobinism
- Notable works: History of the Jews under Fascism (1961); Biography of Mussolini (1965–1996)
- Movement: Historical revisionism

Renzo De Felice (8 April 1929 – 25 May 1996) was an Italian historian who specialized in the Fascist era. Among other works, he authored a 6000-page biography of Mussolini (4 volumes, 1965–1997). He argued that Mussolini was a revolutionary modernizer in domestic issues but a pragmatist in foreign policy who continued the Realpolitik policies of Italy from 1861 to 1922. Historian of Italy Philip Morgan has called De Felice's biography of Mussolini "a very controversial, influential and at the same time problematic re-reading of Mussolini and Fascism" and rejected the contention that his work rose above politics to "scientific objectivity", as claimed by the author and his defenders.

== Biography ==
De Felice was born in Rieti and studied under Federico Chabod and Delio Cantimori at the Sapienza University of Rome. During his time as student, he was a member of the Italian Communist Party. After the Soviet repression of the Hungarian Revolution of 1956, De Felice was among 101 Italian intellectuals who sharply criticized the party for backing of the Soviets.

He broke with it and joined the Italian Socialist Party. He taught history at the University of Rome. He was married to Livia De Ruggiero. He died in Rome.

== Mussolini biography ==
De Felice is best known for a massive four-volume, eight-book biography of Benito Mussolini that was almost finished when he died. De Felice was the founder and editor of the influential journal Storia Contemporanea. De Felice also wrote a well-regarded history of Jewish life under the Fascist government and articles on Italian Jacobinism.

De Felice's leading interest was in Fascism. In his view, there were two types of Fascism, "Fascism as a movement" and "Fascism as a regime". De Felice saw Fascism, especially in the "movement" stage, as a revolutionary middle-class ideology that had deep roots in the Age of Enlightenment. Moreover, De Felice insisted that it was not caused by fear of a proletarian revolution on the part of the lower middle classes, as leftist historiography maintained; but it was an assertive movement, originated by an emerging middle class in search for its proper role.

Fascism, as a regime, was seen by De Felice as nothing more than Mussolini's policy, which tended to make of fascist ideology just the superstructure of Mussolini's dictatorship and personal power. De Felice felt that fascism should be seen as valid political ideology, not just something to be demonized and dismissed in simplistic terms. He argued that studies on Fascism should get out from the political debate and become a historiographical issue based on scientific assertions.

Furthermore, De Felice insisted that there was no connection or valid comparisons to be drawn between Italian Fascism and German National Socialism, which De Felice saw as being a completely different political ideology. Critics on the Left attacked De Felice for being too sympathetic to Italian Fascism. Giuliano Procacci, Paolo Alatri, Nicola Tranfaglia and others even accused De Felice of supporting Fascism. However, Italian communist leader and intellectual activist Giorgio Amendola came to De Felice's defence and rejected many of the criticisms of Giovanni Ferrara in 1975, calling for more civil dialogue on Fascism and Antifascism. Although he acknowledged many of De Felice's discrepancies, Amendola endorsed some of De Felice's ideas, including the "revolutionary aspect in Fascism" and the theory that Mussolini's Fascist movement attracted many adherents among the populace.

== Selected bibliography ==
- Storia degli ebrei italiani sotto il fascismo, 1961.
- Mussolini, 4 volumes, 1965–1997 (Turin, 1965–97)

vol. I, Mussolini il rivoluzionario, 1883–1920;
vol. II.1, Mussolini il fascista, La conquista del potere, 1921–1925,
vol. II.2, Mussolini il fascista,, L’organizzazione dello Stato fascista, 1925–1929;
vol. III.1, Mussolini il duce, Gli anni del consenso, 1929–1936,
vol. III.2, Mussolini il duce, Lo stato totalitario, 1936–1940;
vol. IV.1, Mussolini l’alleato, 1940–1945, L’Italia in guerra, 1940–1943, Dalla guerra "breve" alla guerra lunga,
vol. IV.2, Mussolini l’alleato, 1940–1945, L’Italia in guerra, 1940–1943, Crisi e agonia del regime,
vol. IV.3, Mussolini l’alleato, 1940–1945, La guerra civile, 1943–1945.

- Le interpretazioni del fascismo, 1969.
- Il fascismo: le interpretazioni dei contemporanei e degli storici, 1970.
- Intervista sul fascismo, edited by Michael Ledeen, 1975.
- Ebrei in un paese arabo: gli ebrei nella Libia contemporanea tra colonialismo, nazionalismo arabo e sionismo (1835–1970), 1978.
