= Giovanni Preziosi =

Italian fascist politician (1881–1945)

Preziosi in December 1944

Giovanni Preziosi (24 October 1881 – 26 April 1945) was an Italian fascist politician noted for his contributions to Fascist Italy.

== Early life and career ==
Preziosi was born on 24 October 1881 in Torella dei Lombardi into a middle-class family. He joined the priesthood after completing his studies. Although he was defrocked in 1911, he remained a lifelong adherent of conservative Catholicism. He then followed a career in journalism, founding the Vita Italiana all'estero as a magazine for emigrants. This was followed by his journal La Vita Italiana, which was noted for its harsh criticism of Jews in the run-up to World War I. He soon became involved in Italian fascist political circles, eventually becoming a member of Benito Mussolini's National Fascist Party and taking part in the March on Rome.

== Antisemitism ==
Initially, Preziosi was not antisemitic. After Italy's poor returns for the involvement in the First World War, he came to blame Jewish elements in Italy for many of its ills. He argued the Jews were incapable of being racially and spiritually Italian due to what he considered to be their alleged double loyalties and the growth of Zionism, and believed in the notions that Jews were behind communism, Freemasonry, capitalism, and democracy. Much of his thought was influenced by La Libre Parole, a newspaper founded by Edouard Drumont, Howell Arthur Gwynne's The Cause of World Unrest, and The Dearborn Independent of Henry Ford. He became the first to translate The Protocols of the Elders of Zion into the Italian language in 1921. Such were the strength of his beliefs that Preziosi criticized a contemporary antisemitic critic Paolo Orano for his perceived soft stance on Jews.

Although a hardliner in terms of his fascism, Preziosi denounced Nazism as parochial, exclusionary, and responsible for pushing Europe towards communism. In his early years, he had demonstrated a strong Germanophobia, and published a book entitled Germania alla conquista dell'Italia in 1916. From 1933 onward, he changed tack, becoming a strong advocate of close co-operation with Nazi Germany and occasionally criticized Italian fascism for its lack of emphasis on perceived Jewish wrongdoings. His views reached a wider audience after the passing of the Italian Racial Laws, as he began to write articles for the national press and his own journal.

== Later career and death ==
In 1923, Preziosi coadiuvated the Italian nationalist Ettore Tolomei in preparing the manifesto called the Provvedimenti per l'Alto Adige ("Measures for the Alto Adige"), becoming the blueprint for the Italianization of South Tyrol campaign. Preziosi's growing prestige was rewarded in 1942 when he was made a minister of state. Some in the Nazi hierarchy considered putting Farinacci in charge of a German-backed Italian government in Northern Italy (the future Italian Social Republic (RSI), but he was passed over in favor of Mussolini when the latter was rescued by Otto Skorzeny in September in the Gran Sasso raid. Following the formation of (RSI), Preziosi was initially moved to Nazi Germany where he was to serve as Adolf Hitler's adviser on Italian affairs. Whilst in Germany, he contributed to propaganda in Nazi Germany through a show on Radio Munich, which was broadcast to Mussolini's Italy, and used it as a platform to attack the likes of Guido Buffarini Guidi and Alessandro Pavolini as "Jew-lovers".

Preziosi returned to Italy in March 1944 to head up an Ispettorato Generale della Razza (General Inspectorate of Race). In this role, he introduced a system based on the Nuremberg Laws and used the new code to crack down on Jewish elements which were deemed unacceptable. During the RSI years, he pursued the extermination of the Jews, in the words of the historian of fascism Emilio Gentile, "with fanatical fury". Along with Roberto Farinacci, he also became a close ally of Julius Evola during this period in a pro-fascistic alliance. Preziosi's activities were at times frustrated by Mussolini, who held a long-standing personal distrust of him, but feared making of him a permanent foe; Preziosi's efforts still ensured that the puppet state would be involved in the Nazi war effort.

In the late days of the war, following a narrow escape from the Italian partisans on 26 April 1945, Preziosi fled on foot with his wife Valeria to the city of Milan, where they found refuge in the homes of friends. The next day, they were found to have taken their own lives by throwing themselves out of a fourth floor window. In his farewell letter, Preziosi wrote: "I have lived my whole life for the greatness of my fatherland. I followed Mussolini because I saw in him the man who could give greatness to the Fatherland. After 25 July I hoped again. Today, when everything collapses, I can do nothing better than not survive. In this act she follows me who has shared all my struggles and all my hopes. One day, our son Romano will be proud of this gesture."
