= Federico Chabod =

Italian historian and politician

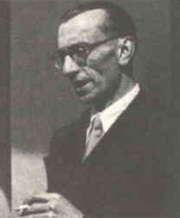
- Federico Chabod
- Born: February 23, 1901; Aosta, Italy
- Died: July 14, 1960 (aged 59); Rome, Italy
- Citizenship: Italian
- Education: University of Turin, University of Berlin
- Scientific career
- Fields: History, Politician
- Workplaces: University of Perugia, University of Milan, University of Rome
- Doctoral advisor: Pietro Egidi, Gaetano Salvemini, Friedrich Meinecke

Federico Chabod (Italian: [fedeˈriːko ʃʃaˈbo]; February 23, 1901 – July 14, 1960), also referred to as Frédéric Chabod (French: [fʁedeʁik ʃabo]), was an Italian historian and politician.

== Biography ==
Born in Aosta from notary Laurent Chabod, from Valsavarenche, and Giuseppina Baratono, from Ivrea, he studied at the University of Turin under Pietro Egidi and Gaetano Salvemini, writing his thesis on Machiavelli. His thesis was published with the title of Introduzione al Principe in 1924. After graduating from the University of Turin, he continued his studies, this time at the University of Berlin under Friedrich Meinecke. He began his academic career at the University of Perugia and the University of Milan. In 1946, he was hired by the University of Rome to head the Istituto Italiano per gli Studi Storici founded by Benedetto Croce. He is best known for expanding Italian historiography from its traditional insularity by linking it in a broader, European context.

Chabod died at Rome in 1960.

== Works ==
- L'Italia contemporanea
- L'Historiographie de l'Italie contemporaine
- De Machiavel à Benedetto Croce: études présentées
- Histoire de l'idée d'Europe
- Storia della politica estera italiana dal 1870 al 1896, 1951. English trans. 1996.
- Lezioni di metodo storico
- Scritti su Machiavelli
- Scritti sul Rinascimento
- Il ducato di Milano e l'impero di Carlo V
- Lo Stato e la vita religiosa a Milano nell'epoca di Carlo V
- Storia di Milano nell'epoca di Carlo V
- Carlo V e il suo impero
- Storia dell'idea d'Europa
- Idea di Europa e politica dell'equilibro
- L'idea di nazione
