= Telesio Interlandi =

Italian journalist and propagandist (1894–1965)

Interlandi in the early 1940s

Telesio Interlandi (20 October 1894 – 15 January 1965) was an Italian journalist and propagandist. He was one of the leading advocates of antisemitism in Fascist Italy.

== Biography ==
Born in Chiaramonte Gulfi, Interlandi took his degree in law and became a journalist, writing for such papers as Il Travaso delle idee (from 1919), La Nazione (from 1921), and Impero (from 1923) before joining Il Tevere in 1924. Under Interlandi, this paper became the first distributor of antisemitic propaganda in the mainstream Italian press. In this respect, he became associated with Roberto Farinacci and Giovanni Preziosi, and helped to promulgate their antisemitic views. An important figure within the National Fascist Party, Interlandi was the director of the Fascist Federation of the Italian Press and head of the Fascist Journalist Association.

Interlandi was a devotee of racialism and believed that the concept of race was central to the fascist national revolution and this was the root of his strong antisemitism. He founded two journals, Il Quadrivio in 1934 and La Difesa della Razza in 1938, both noted not only for their antisemitism but also for their admiration of Nazism. Such was the strength of Interlandi's hatred of the Jews that he was personally told by Benito Mussolini to moderate his language.

Interlandi continued to write following the establishment of the Republic of Salò, mainly for Giovanni Preziosi's Vita Italiana journal. He also briefly served as propaganda chief for the puppet state. Following the war, he was not imprisoned but was deprived of his property and disappeared from public view. Although he had no direct involvement with the neo-fascist Italian Social Movement, his writings were an important ideological influence on Giorgio Almirante.
