= Tend and befriend =

Animal behavior in response to threat

Tend-and-befriend is a purported behavior exhibited by some animals, including humans, in response to threat. It refers to protection of offspring (tending) and seeking out their social group for mutual defense (befriending). In evolutionary psychology, tend-and-befriend is theorized as having evolved as the typical female response to stress.

The tend-and-befriend theoretical model was originally developed by Shelley E. Taylor and her research team at the University of California, Los Angeles and first described in a Psychological Review article published in the year 2000.

The theory has been criticized as contradicting social science research, especially how men and women behave in non-Western cultures.

== Biological bases ==
Oxytocin has been tied to a broad array of social relationships and activities, including peer bonding, sexual activity, and affiliative preferences. Oxytocin is released in humans in response to a broad array of stressors, especially those that may trigger affiliative needs. Oxytocin promotes affiliative behavior, including maternal tending and social contact with peers. Thus, affiliation under stress serves tending needs, including protective responses towards offspring. Affiliation may also take the form of befriending, namely seeking social contact for one's own protection, the protection of offspring, and the protection of the social group. These social responses to threat reduce biological stress responses, including lowering heart rate, blood pressure, and hypothalamic pituitary adrenal axis (HPA) stress activity, such as cortisol responses.

According to some research, women are more likely to respond to stress through tending and befriending than men. Paralleling this behavioral sex difference, estrogen enhances the effects of oxytocin, whereas androgens inhibit oxytocin release.

A recent study suggests that men and women exhibit distinct stress responses. While men tend to display a "fight-or-flight" response, women more commonly demonstrate this "tend-and-befriend" pattern. This distinction is supported by both neuroendocrine and behavioral evidence. In both sexes, the physiological stress response generally involves activation of the sympathetic nervous system and the hypothalamic-pituitary-adrenal (HPA) axis. However, in females, the stress response is thought to draw more specifically upon attachment and caregiving processes.

== Tending under stress ==
Female stress responses that increased offspring survival would have led to higher fitness and thus were more likely to be passed on through natural selection. In the presence of threats, protecting and calming offspring while blending into the environment may have increased chances of survival for mother and child. When faced with stress, females often respond by tending to offspring, which in turn reduces stress levels. Studies conducted by Repetti (1989) show that mothers respond to highly stressful workdays by providing more nurturing behaviors towards their children. In contrast, fathers who experienced stressful workdays were more likely to withdraw from their families or were more interpersonally conflictual that evening at home. Furthermore, physical contact between mothers and their offspring following a threatening event decreased HPA activity and sympathetic nervous system arousal. Oxytocin, released in response to stressors, may be the mechanism underlying the female caregiving response. Studies of ewes show that administration of oxytocin promoted maternal behavior. Breastfeeding in humans, which is associated with maternal oxytocin release, is physiologically calming to both mothers and infants.

=== Cooperative breeding ===
Tend-and-befriend is a critical, adaptive strategy that is hypothesized to have enhanced reproductive success among female cooperative breeders. Cooperative breeders are group-living animals where infant and juvenile care from non-mother helpers are essential to offspring survival. Cooperative breeders include wolves, elephants, many nonhuman primates, and humans. Among all primates and most mammals, endocrinological and neural processes lead females to nurture infants, including unrelated infants, after being exposed long enough to infant signals. Non-mother female wolves and wild dogs sometimes begin lactating to nurse the alpha female's pups.

Humans are born helpless and altricial, mature slowly, and depend on parental investment well into their young adult lives, and often even later. Humans have spent most of human evolution as hunter-gatherer foragers. Among foraging societies without modern birth control methods, women tend to give birth about every four years during their reproductive lifespan. When mothers give birth, they often have multiple dependent children in their care, who rely on adults for food and shelter for years. Such a reproductive strategy would not have been able to evolve if women did not have help from others. Allomothers (helpers who are not a child's mother) often protect, provision, carry, and care for children. Allomothers are usually a child's aunts, uncles, fathers, grandmothers, siblings, and other persons in the community. Even in modern Western societies, parents often rely on family members, friends, and babysitters to help care for children. Burkart, Hrdy, and Van Schaik (2009) argue that cooperative breeding in humans may have led to the evolution of psychological adaptations for greater prosociality, enhanced social cognition, and cognitive abilities for cooperative purposes, including willingness to share mental states and shared intentionality. These cognitive, prosocial processes brought on by cooperative breeding may have led to the emergence of culture and language.

== Befriending under stress ==
Group living provides numerous benefits, including protection from predators and cooperation to achieve shared goals and access to resources. In modernized societies at least, it is found that women create, maintain, and use social networks—especially friendships with other women—to manage stressful conditions. During threatening situations, group members can be a source of support and protection for women and their children. Research shows that women operating in a modern and westernized paradigm are more likely to seek the company of others in times of stress, compared to men. In some cultures, women and adolescent girls report more sources of social support and are more likely to turn to same-sex peers for support than men or boys are. One study of six cultures (five of whom were non-western) found that women and girls tend to provide more frequent and effective support than men do, and they are more likely to seek help and support from other female friends and family members, although there was a degree of cultural variation based on the metric used. Women tend to affiliate with other women under stressful situations. However, when women were given a choice to either wait alone or to affiliate with an unfamiliar man before a stressful laboratory challenge, they chose to wait alone. Female-female social networks can provide assistance for childcare, exchange of resources, and protection from predators, other threats, and other group members. Smuts (1992) and Taylor et al. (2000) argue that female social groups also provide protection from male aggression. In spite of the large cultural diversity within this six-culture sample, none of the societies included demonstrated matrilineal tendencies, which have been found to negate and cancel out many supposedly "universal" sex differences (see "criticism" section below). Additionally, the metrics used by the Whitings for evaluating sex differences in social support are somewhat questionable in their ability to predict friendship and relational quality and solidarity. Many other surveys and tests, for instance, find that males actually demonstrate a greater degree of social support than women do in many non-western cultures, particularly from same-gender friendship networks.

=== Neuroendocrine underpinnings ===
Human and animal studies (reviewed in Taylor et al., 2000) suggest that oxytocin is the neuroendocrine mechanism underlying the female "befriend" stress response. Oxytocin administration to rats and prairie voles increased social contact and social grooming behaviors, reduced stress, and lowered aggression. In humans, oxytocin promotes mother-infant attachments, romantic pair bonds, and friendships. Social contact or support during stressful times leads to lowered sympathetic and neuroendocrine stress responses. Although social support downregulates these physiological stress responses in both men and women, women are more likely to seek some forms of social contact during stress. Furthermore, support from another female provides enhanced stress-reducing benefits to women. However, a review of female aggression noted that "The fact that OT [oxytocin] enhances, rather than diminishes, attention to potential threat in the environment casts doubt on the popular 'tend-and-befriend' hypothesis which is based on the presumed anxiolytic effect of OT".

=== Benefits of affiliation under stress ===
According to Taylor (2000), affiliative behaviors and tending activities reduce biological stress responses in both parents and offspring, thereby reducing stress-related health threats. "Befriending" may lead to substantial mental and physical health benefits in times of stress. Social isolation is associated with significantly enhanced risk of mortality, whereas social support is tied to positive health outcomes, including reduced risk of illness and death.

Women have higher life expectancies from birth in modernized countries where there is equal access to medical care. In the United States, for example, this difference is almost 6 years. One hypothesis is that men's responses to stress (which include aggression, social withdrawal, and substance abuse) place them at risk for adverse health-related consequences. In contrast, women's responses to stress, which include turning to social sources for support, may be protective to health. There are a number of problems and controversies inherent in this reading, however. One major issue is that the female advantage in life expectancy is relatively recent and seems to be related to major societal changes accompanying industrialization, only some of which relate to modern medical advancements. Prior to the Industrial Revolution, men outlived women in many of the societies for which we have demographic data, and in many non-western societies the gap only begun to close and then reverse in the mid-to-late 20th century. The supposed "universality" of women's more adaptive coping mechanisms in response to stress is further challenged by pre-modern data indicating that female rates of suicide were much higher than male rates in many traditional societies.

=== Competition for resources ===
Group living and affiliation with multiple unrelated others of the same sex (who do not share genetic interests) also presents the problem of competing for access to limited resources, such as social status, food, and mates. Interpersonal stress is the most common and distressing type of stress for women. Although the befriending stress response may be especially activated for women under conditions of resource scarcity, resource scarcity also entails more intense competition for these resources. In environments with a female-biased sex ratio, where males are a more limited resource, female-to-female competition for mates is intensified, sometimes even resorting to violence. Although male crime rates far exceed those of females, arrests for assault among females follow a similar age distribution as in males, peaking for females in the late teens to mid-twenties. Those are ages in which females are at peak reproductive potential and experience the most mating competition. However, the benefits of affiliation would have outweighed the costs in order for tend-and-befriend to have evolved.

==== Competition and aggression ====
Rates of aggression between human males and females may not differ, but the patterns of aggression between the sexes do differ in many societies and by many different metrics. Although females in general are less physically aggressive, they tend to engage in as much or even more indirect aggression (e.g. social exclusion, gossip, rumors, denigration). When experimentally primed with a mating motive or status competition motive, men were more willing to become directly aggressive towards another man, whereas women were more likely to indirectly aggress against another woman in an aggression-provoking situation. However, experimentally priming people with a resource competition motive increased direct aggression in both men and women. Consistent with this result, rates of violence and crime are higher among males and females under conditions of resource scarcity. In contrast, resource competition did not increase direct aggression in either men or women when they were asked to imagine themselves married and with a young child. The costs of physical injury to a parent would also entail costs to his or her family.

Lower variance in reproductive success and higher costs of physical aggression may explain the lower rates of physical aggression among human females compared to males. Females are in general more likely to produce offspring in their lifetimes than males, although this difference lessens or disappears in societies where monogamy or polyandry have become standardized. Therefore, they typically have less to gain from fighting and the risk of injury or death would produce greater fitness cost for females. The survival of young children might depend more on maternal than paternal care (although a number of studies of traditional societies have found that parental care in general is less essential than sometimes believed, and can be compensated for via alloparenting by both sexes), which underscores the importance of maternal safety, survival, and risk aversion. In this hypothetical model, infants' primary attachment is to their mother; notably, one study found that maternal death increased the chances of childhood mortality in foraging societies by fivefold, compared to threefold in the cases of paternal death. Therefore, women are believed by certain researchers to respond to threats by tending and befriending, and female aggression is often indirect and covert in nature to avoid retaliation and physical injury.

===== Informational warfare =====
Women befriend others not only for protection, but also to form alliances to compete with outgroup members for resources, such as food, mates, and social and cultural resources (e.g. status, social positions, rights and responsibilities). Informational warfare is the strategic, competitive tactics taking the form of indirect, verbal aggression directed towards rivals. Gossip is one such tactic, functioning to spread information that would damage the reputation of a competitor. There are several theories regarding gossip, including social bonding and group cohesion. However, consistent with informational warfare theory, the content of gossip is relevant to the context in which competition is occurring. For example, when competing for a work promotion, people were more likely to spread negative work-related information about a competitor to coworkers. Negative gossip also increases with resource scarcity and higher resource value. In addition, people are more likely to spread negative information about potential rivals but more likely to pass on positive information about family members and friends.

As mentioned above, befriending can serve to protect women from threats, including harm from other people. Such threats are not limited to physical harm but also include reputational damage. Women form friendships and alliances in part to compete for limited resources, and also in part to protect themselves from relational and reputational harm. The presence of friends and allies can help deter malicious gossip, due to an alliance's greater ability to retaliate, compared to a single individual's ability. Studies by Hess and Hagen (2009) show that the presence of a competitor's friend reduced people's tendencies to gossip about the competitor. This effect was stronger when the friend was from the same competitive social environment (e.g. same workplace) than when the friend was from a nonrelevant social environment. Friends increase women's perceived capabilities for inflicting reputational harm on a rival as well as perceptions of defensive capabilities against indirect aggression.

== Criticism and controversy ==
Like most evolutionary psychological theories related to sex differences in behavior, the "tend and befriend" model relies on a great deal of speculation, projection of present-day data into the distant past, untestable and unfalsifiable hypotheses, and reliance on a model of gender essentialism which has come under increasing critique from various social scientists in recent years.

One major issue from an anthropological standpoint is the considerable diversity of gendered norms and behaviors in traditional societies, and the difficulty for western researchers to interpret these adequately using quantitative and etic means. Social and behavioral scientists often struggle to keep their personal biases and paradigms from affecting their interpretation of the data, with mixed results. For instance, anthropologists working within a psychoanalytic framework often set out on their project expecting to find cross-cultural confirmation of western gendered ideas such as castration anxiety or the Oedipus complex, only to run into considerable difficulty when non-western societies frequently deviate from these perceived "universal" norms. Sociobiologists and evolutionary psychologists in general have come under fire for cherry-picking and misinterpreting cross-cultural data in order to align with preconceptions about the universality of "human nature", and then accusing cultural anthropologists of various cognitive biases and over-reliance on the alleged "standard social science model". The perceived cross-cultural validation of gender norms such as higher female nurturance or male aggression and assertiveness would therefore have to be evaluated, as much as possible, using emic or culturally-specific means, or through researchers trained in culturally sensitive methodologies (such as Franz Boas' cultural relativism) with the hopes of minimizing western cultural biases.

In spite of the perceived universal and biological basis for the tend and befriend response in human women, there is actually a great deal of controversy as to how consistently replicable western gender norms are across the broad range of human societies. Some researchers have found apparently consistent differences across countries favoring women's greater sociability and agreeableness (the dimensions most likely to map onto the tend and befriend theory). However, there are considerable variations between countries, particularly on extraversion, which would seem to frustrate any attempt to find universal bidirectional patterns favoring women's greater tendencies towards cooperative or gregarious behaviors. Many cross-cultural quantitative samples utilized by evolutionary psychologists are also plagued by a patrilineal or patriarchal bias. There is a rich body of data illustrating greater tendencies among women in various cultures toward cooperation, less overt competitiveness, more pro-social and nurturant responses, and preference for indirect and non-confrontational speech styles. For instance, Whiting and Whiting's influential "six culture study" found apparently consistent confirmation of western-stereotyped gender behaviors in six different communities spread across the world: New Englanders in the United States, Mixtec in Mexico, Ilocanos in the Philippines, Rajputs in India, Okinawans in Japan, and Gusii in Kenya. All of these communities are traditional patriarchal, and four of the six are also patrilineal. Even in the two non-patrilineal societies (New Englanders and Ilocanos), there was considerable inculcation towards conformity with patriarchal gender norms, from the capitalistic wage economy in New England and the influence of Spanish Christianity in the Philippines. This is important since matrilineal and bilateral descent is consistently associated with elimination or even reversal of purported gender differences in competitiveness versus co-operation. Folklore illustrates another piece of evidence for the diversity of gendered behavioral norms; while the familiar construction of dominant and assertive males vs submissive and nurturing females is replicated frequently in cross-cultural folklore motifs, there are notable exceptions and instances of reversed motifs (dominant and assertive females, submissive and nurturing males) in monogamous or matrilineal cultures like the Kadiweu and the Palikur.

Heide Gottner-Abendroth's analysis of matriarchal societies (which she defines as all non-patriarchal societies) further challenges the notion that men are inherently less nurturant and therefore less prone to tending and befriending. In non-patriarchal societies, men are often expected to internalize virtues that western society codes as stereotypically "feminine", and the culturally constructed machismo which prevents men in many parts of the world from participating in child care or nurturing warm and pro-social coalitional relationships does not seem to exist.

The tend and befriend model also assumes a lower emotional and psychological quality to male same-sex friendships as compared to those between women, interpreting the former as largely "instrumental" and focused on giving and returning favors, building coalitions or acquiring resources while the latter function as superior means of social support. This claim runs squarely counter to data finding that male friendships are equally if not more valuable to men's psychological well-being and societal adjustment than women's. This tendency to read men's homosocial relationships as somehow inherently "defective" in terms of psychoemotional support compared to women's does not fit with historical or cross-cultural accounts of deep romantic friendships between males and considerable emotional intimacy that male friends exchange in a number of non-western societies. Even in modern times, some quantitative research suggest that in some societies which are not affected by Northern European male anxieties about homosocial intimacy (such as Turkey or Portugal), men are equally or even more likely than women to share emotional hardships with same-sexed friends and to offer and receive emotional support from them. In the past, before globalization and industrialization standardized the modern cultural traits of males disproportionately "projecting inward" by killing themselves or using maladaptive coping mechanisms (such as substance abuse), such homosocial intimacy may have been higher across much of the world. it's worth noting that in eastern societies where heterosexual cross-sex contact is often limited men display as much intimacy in their same sex friendships and self disclose to their same sex friends just as much if not slightly more such as in India and Jordan.

== See also ==
- Coping (psychology)
- Need for affiliation
- Peer support
- Positive psychology
