= Group augmentation =

In animal behaviour, the hypothesis of group augmentation is where animals living in a group behave to increase the group's size, namely through the recruitment of new members. Such behaviour could be selected for if a larger group size increases the chance of survival of the individuals in the group. Supported hypothesis of selection mechanisms towards increasing group size currently exists, in helping raise other animals' offspring (alloparental care) and performing other cooperative breeding acts including kin selection. It is currently proposed that group augmentation may be another mechanism (closely related/connected to cooperative breeding) which occurs through the recruiting of new group members and helping of unrelated individuals within a group.

== Group Augmentation Mechanisms ==
Group augmentation can occur via two separate mechanisms. Passive group augmentation is described as the mere presence of other individuals in a group providing a benefit to a group member. Where as active group augmentation is described as the presence of other individuals causing no benefit or a detrimental effect to a group member; but where the presence of the other individuals later increases the overall level of reproductiveness of the group, also known as delayed reciprocity. An example of the phenomenon of delayed reciprocity (or "returning the favour") is where an organism will help raise an un-related individual at a cost, and once the individual is an adult it helps the organism which raised it; either by its presence increasing group size, or by assisting in breeding activity. Research suggests that both types of group augmentation can be used to explain the expensive helping behaviour of non-reproducing subordinate individuals as evolutionary stable. It is also important to note that both forms of group augmentation are thought to act in tandem with kin selection to further explain increased levels of helping behaviour. Aside from helping to raise offspring, another way by which helping behaviour leads to group augmentation is through lowering group mortality (through actions such as vigilance behaviour). Group augmentation is proposed to help explain the evolution of helping behaviour, such as cooperative breeding. Group augmentation may be used in cooperative breeding groups, in particular, to explain helping behaviour between individuals which have low relatedness. Certain species show that costly helping behaviour which can not be explained solely by kin selection, may be explained by the underestimated value a large group to an individual.

== Species Specific Examples ==
=== Meerkat (Suricata suricatta) ===
The meerkat is one species where group augmentation is suspected to be an important driver of cooperative behaviour. It is believed that relatedness degree, or kin selection, is not the only driver of helping behaviour in meerkats, as research has demonstrated that weight, age and sex of the subordinates may better correlate with helping babysitting behaviour. As meerkats have been noted to help un-related individuals, one potential explanation is the benefit of increasing group size (as group size is correlated with survival); this non-related altruistic behaviour is thus thought to be a cooperative behaviour driven by group augmentation.

=== White Winged Choughs (Corcorax melanorhamphos) ===
The White Winged Choughs display a unique behaviour, according to some research, of kidnapping and raising unrelated young. In one experiment spanning four years a total 14 young birds were regarded to be "stolen" from one group of Choughs to another, here it is evident that kin selection is likely not the driving force as stolen individuals were captured from seemingly un-related groups. Associated research has concluded that helpers (which can include young birds) are necessary for successful reproduction, and no instance of successful breeding has been noted to occur without helpers. Here group augmentation theory is largely supported as it was also demonstrated that reproductive success linearly increased with group size, and the choughs are actively recruiting new unrelated members.

=== Chimpanzees (Pan troglodytes) ===
Chimpanzees are a nonhuman primate which exhibits an interesting cooperative behaviour of territorial boundary patrolling. As with most cooperative behaviours some aspects are strongly attributed to kin selection; including an increased incidence of patrol behaviour when offspring were present in the group. Other aspects of this behaviour however were better attributed to the group augmentation theory, in that, the chimpanzees had individuals which routinely patrolled at high cost although the immediate gain was minimal, but led to a larger group size and future potential for reproductive success. Evidence of this cooperative behaviour being related to group augmentation was based on the fact that some males were notice to patrol, even when there were no offspring or maternal relatives in the group. Further observations included that increase in group size did not impact the totally patrolling effort of the group, so helping behaviour was continuously attempting to increase group size.

== Criticism of Group Augmentation Hypothesis ==
The group augmentation hypothesis is not universally accepted by all ethologists, as other well studied explanations for cooperative behaviour exist. Kin selection has been largely proven to be the main driver of the cooperative breeding strategy, through the application of Hamilton's rule across a large variety of studies. Kin selection is the theory that animals act altruistically towards members of their own species in a ratio which is dependent on how genetically related those individuals are to one another. A further criticism of group augmentation predictions replacing or occurring in tandem with kinship, is that the augmentation theory lacks clear empirical data. It is also argued that animals live in groups only for the purpose of an immediate net benefit towards reproductive success. One study of a bird obligate cooperative breeder in particular showed that, while breeding success was dependent on cooperative behaviour, linkage to kinship was ultimately able to explain the behaviour of those species. Overall, literature suggests more empirical data is required for group augmentation theory to be generally accepted.

== See also ==
- Kin selection
- Cooperative breeding
- Alloparental care
- Evolutionary stable strategy
- Group selection
