= Amy Parish =

Biological anthropologist, primatologist

- Education: University of Michigan University of California, Davis
- Employer: University of Southern California
- Known for: Bonobos Studies; Darwinian Feminism

Amy Parish is a biological anthropologist, primatologist, and Darwinian feminist. She has taught at the University of Southern California in the Gender Studies and Anthropology departments since 1999. She is recognised as being a world leading expert in bonobo studies.

== Education ==
Parish completed an undergraduate degree at the University of Michigan in 1989. She received her Masters of Science from the University of California-Davis in 1990, where she completed her PhD. Her dissertation focussed on sociosexual behaviour and the female-female relationships of bonobos, under the supervision of Sarah Blaffer Hrdy.

== Research ==
After graduating UCD, Parish moved to University College London, where she worked with Volker Sommer on behavioural patterns of animals. During this time Parish became an expert on bonobos. Whilst studying bonobos at San Diego's Wild Animal Park, she demonstrated a distinct preference of bonobo females for each other's company. Parish moved to the University of Giessen in Germany, where she focussed on reciprocity.

Parish uses an evolutionary approach to understand human behaviour. In 1999 Parish joined the University of Southern California. At USC she has taught eighteen different topics in across a range of disciplines, including Anthropology, Gender Studies, Arts and Letters, Health and Humanities, School of Education, Psychology. She taught a course on "love, marriage and the experience of being a wife and on the cultural impact of Darwin’s theories".

In 2012 she gave a talk at the Natural History Museum, where she revealed "bonobos have more sex, in more ways, and for more reasons, than most humans can imagine". Whilst at Wilhelma, a zoo in Stuttgart, she observed "two females attack a male at the Stuttgart Zoo in Germany and bit his penis in half". In 2013 Parish spoke at World Vasectomy Day about the Evolution of Contraception. In 2016 she gave a keynote talk at the In2In Thinking Forum, "Apes, Power, and Sex: Why We Make War Not Love".

Alongside research, Parish teaches English at La Jolla Country Day School.

== Darwinian feminism ==
For centuries, the mainly male evolutionary scientists overlooked the significance of female animals behaviour; treating it as a passive constant in a drama dominated by aggressive males. Darwinian Feminism began when Parish and her then supervisor, Sarah Hrdy, began to reevaluate animal behavior. Their goal has been simple; to pay equal attention to male and female interests. In Bonobos, Parish found a matriarchal society, which she thinks "should give hope to the human feminist movement". Parish was featured in Angela Saini's 2017 book Inferior: How Science Got Women Wrong and the New Research That’s Rewriting the Story.

Parish has been featured in Ms Magazine, as well as on the television Nova, National Geographic Explorer and Discovery Channel. Her research formed part of the PBS evolution library for teachers and students. She regularly gives public talks about her research.

Parish is a fellow of the Los Angeles Institute for the Humanities. She is on the board of the Kids Eco Club. She is the scientific advisor for the Bonobo Conservation Initiative.
