= Barbara Smuts =

American anthropologist and psychologist (born 1950)

Barbara Boardman Smuts
- Born: 1950 (age 75–76)
- Occupations: Anthropologist, psychologist
- Known for: Social relationships among animals

Barbara Boardman Smuts is an American anthropologist and psychologist noted for her research into baboons, dolphins, and chimpanzees, and a Professor Emeritus at University of Michigan, Ann Arbor.

== Early life and education ==
Smuts was born to Alice Smuts (1921–2020) and Robert ("Bob") Walter Schmutz (later anglicised to Smuts) in 1950. She has a brother, Robert Malcolm Smuts, born 1949. Smuts moved to Michigan with her family in 1960, and in 1969 to Ann Arbor whilst her mother obtained her Ph.D. She has an undergraduate degree from Harvard University in anthropology, and did a Ph.D. in neurological and biological behavioral science at Stanford Medical School with David Hamburg.

== Research ==
Much of Smuts' research concerns the development of social relationships between animals, particularly among chimpanzee and baboon populations. In the 1970s she began studying animal behaviour at the University of Michigan, including research with Jane Goodall on chimpanzees in Gombe National Park in Tanzania. In Gombe, Smuts had a violent introduction to field research, being among four field researchers kidnapped and beaten by a Marxist revolutionary group. Though none of the captured spoke Swahili, Smuts was able to communicate with the leader of the guerrillas in French. She was then released after a week to communicate the rebels' demands to those working to get the victims released.

Smuts began studies of wild baboons in 1976, and her observations challenged the prevailing view of male dominance. Studies she made of wild olive baboons in Tanzania and Kenya inspired her 1985 book Sex and Friendship in Baboons. The book, the fruit of two years' research, showed how two different groups of the same primate interact with each other socially. She determined that friendship was a critical predictor of sexual activity between male and female baboons: females preferred to mate with males that had previously engaged in friendly interactions with them and could interact with their other offspring as well.

Smuts also carried out research into bottlenose dolphin social development, working extensively with Janet Mann.

Smuts' more recent research at the University of Michigan has focused on social behavior among dogs.

== Views on feminism ==
Smuts endorses feminist sociobiology and argues that studying intersexual conflict sheds light on aspects of human society such as male control of female sexuality, but has stated that justifications for social policies should nevertheless remain rooted in ethics rather than biology.

== Awards ==
She received the American Psychological Association Award for Distinguished Scientific Early Career Contribution to Psychology (Area: Animal Learning and Behavior) in 1988.

== Bibliography ==
- Wrangham, R. and Smuts, B. B. (1980). "Sex differences in the behavioural ecology of chimpanzees in the Gombe National Park, Tanzania." Journal of Reproduction and Fertility. Supplement, 28, 13–31.
- Smuts, B.B. (2009. First printing 1985) Sex and Friendship in Baboons New York: Aldine Publishing Co. ISBN 978-0-202-02027-3
- Smuts, B.B., Cheney, D.L. Seyfarth, R.M., Wrangham, R.W., & Struhsaker, T.T. (Eds.) (1987). Primate Societies. Chicago: University of Chicago Press. ISBN 0-226-76715-9
- Smuts, Barbara B. & Robert W. Smuts (1993). "Male aggression and sexual coercion of females in nonhuman primates and other mammals : evidence and theoretical implications". In Slater, Peter J. B.; Manfred Milinski; Charles T. Snowdon & Jay S. Rosenblatt (eds.). Advances in the Study of Behavior. Vol. 22. San Diego: Academic Press. pp. 1–63.
- Smuts, B. (March 1995). "The evolutionary origins of patriarchy". Human Nature (Hawthorne, N.Y.). 6 (1): 1–32. doi:10.1007/BF02734133. ISSN 1045-6767. PMID 24202828. S2CID 17741169.
- Smuts, Barbara (August 1995). "Apes of wrath". Discover. 16 (8): 35–37.
- Smuts, Barbara B. (1997). "Social Relationships and Life Histories of Primates, in Morbeck, Mary Ellen et al. (eds.), The Evolving Female: A Life-History Perspective, Princeton: Princeton University Press, pp. 60–68.
