= Darwinian feminism =

Branch of feminism

Darwinian feminism, also known as evolutionary feminism or feminist sociobiology, is a school of feminism based on sociobiology and Darwinian evolutionary theory, incorporating scientific findings into feminist analyses of human sociosexual dynamics. Historically, it was influential in driving research on female agency in sexual selection, which prior to the advent of Darwinian feminism had nearly exclusively focused on males. Chief contributors to Darwinian feminist thought include Patricia Adair Gowaty, Sarah Blaffer Hrdy, Griet Vandermassen, Amy Parish, Barbara Smuts, and Marlene Zuk.

== Contribution to science ==
Darwinian feminists such as Sarah Blaffer Hrdy have been influential in research on sexual selection in females, historically understudied in the literature that primarily focused on male individuals as units of sexual selection. Hrdy found that promiscuity and extra-pair copulation among primates such as common chimpanzees and Hanuman langurs was a defence mechanism against infanticide by males by way of paternity confusion.

Darwinian feminists have restructured aspects of the vocabulary of zoology and ethology by altering terminology that in their view centers a behavioural phenomenon in terms of male competition.

== Views ==
Darwinian feminism is defined by an embrace of sociobiology and evolutionary psychology, rejecting both early biological arguments for female inferiority and a "natural role" for women made by some early biologists and the opposition to and denialism of biological explanations for human behaviour by other feminists. Griet Vandermassen states that early development of evolutionary theory was inhibited by the male biases of its founders. Vandermassen argues that while Darwin's theories about sexual selection were revolutionary for their time, she also highlights how Darwin limited himself to only examining male-male competition and female mate choice due to his predisposition to view females as mostly passive agents. These Victorian biases meant that Darwin in his research did not consider male-female competition and female-female competition as evolutionary forces and incorporate them into his thought, Vandermassen argues, and thus failed to produce an even stronger theory of sexual selection with greater predictive power than the one he actually developed. Marlene Zuk argues that Victorian era scientists were ideologically uncomfortable with sexual selection because it assigned sexual agency to female organisms, which by extension included human females, and attributes this as a reason for why Darwin's ideas about sexual selection were widely rejected in his time and why most scientists, Ronald Aylmer Fisher being a notable exception, did not devote much attention to sexual selection as a major driver of evolution until the sociobiological revolution of the 1960s and 1970s.

In a similar vein, Vandermassen criticises schools of feminism that reject and sexual selection as an explanatory factor behind gender dynamics and differences in behaviour between men and women, calling such views "embarrassing" in their ignorance to anyone knowledgeable in modern biology, suggesting that it both deprives feminists of important explanatory tools with high predictive power for analysing society and contributes to negative perceptions of and rejection of feminism by scientifically informed people.

Darwinian feminism rejects the matriarchal fallacy, the idea that women were naturally dominant and that human society was naturally matriarchal until the development of patriarchy. According to Sarah Blaffer Hrdy, such views were invented as counter-narratives to the widespread notion of males as the naturally dominant sex held by many male biologists but have no scientific backing and are contradicted by archaeological and primatological evidence. Similarly, Hrdy criticises Marxist feminism and the thesis that the genesis of patriarchy lay in a division of labour and the exploitation of female labour by males, pointing out that other aspects of male dominance such as the control of female sexuality have deep evolutionary origins within the great ape family and the primate order.
