= Patricia Adair Gowaty =

American biologist

Patricia Adair Gowaty is an American evolutionary biologist. Gowaty is a professor emeritus at the University of Georgia and the University of California, Los Angeles.

== Life and career ==
She received her B.A. in biology at Tulane University and her PhD in zoology at Clemson University in 1980. She is currently a Distinguished Professor at the University of California, Los Angeles. Gowaty is known for her many articles about human and animal behavior and evolution. She is author and editor of a book that seeks to combine feminist theory and Darwinian evolutionary biology. Gowarty coined the term "Darwinian feminism" in 1997.

Gowaty has also written about the effects of and importance of rape in understanding human evolution. Her recent research has focused on the concept of reproductive compensation in population genetics.

In 2012, Gowaty and colleagues reported a precise replication of Angus Bateman's classic experiment on sexual selection in Drosophila. The study showed that Bateman's methodology was flawed. Once these flaws are accounted for, the experimental data did not support his conclusions.

Gowaty is married to biologist Stephen P. Hubbell, with whom she has co-authored many journal articles about ecology and evolutionary biology.
