= Allomothering in humans =

Type of parental care

Allomothering, or allomaternal care, is parental care provided by group members other than the genetic mother. This is a common feature of many cooperative breeding species, including some mammal, bird and insect species. Allomothering in humans is universal, but the members who participate in allomothering vary from culture to culture. Common allomothers are grandmothers, older siblings, extended family members, members of religious communities and ritual kin (such as godparents).

The life history strategy of humans involves a long period of dependency, termed "secondary altriciailty" by Adolf Portmann, which should result in longer interbirth intervals. However, compared to other primates, humans have short interbirth intervals resulting in numerous overlapping dependents all without an increase in child mortality. Allomothering explains how humans can have children spaced only a few years apart and manage to raise multiple children at once. Food provisioning, help with childcare and investment in the child's learning can be provided by members of the community to help ease the mother's investment. Allomothering participants and specific helping behavior varies widely from group to group.

== Theory ==
Cooperative breeding is a reproductive strategy that has been observed in birds, insects, and mammals. In cooperative breeding, parents receive support in childrearing from other members of the community. The parental support of helpers other than parents is known as allomaternal care (from the perspective of the mother, in species where both maternity and paternity is known it is often referred to alloparenting/allopaternal care) and can be carried out by kin and non-kin members of the community. Cooperative breeding is often seen to arise in monogamous mating systems with high coefficients of relatedness between group members and where females give birth to multiple offspring. The presence of allomothers is associated with reductions in interbirth intervals, increases in litter size, higher annual rates of survival. Cooperative breeding reduces the investment necessary for the parents of an offspring allowing the freed-up resources to be directed towards producing more offspring. Studies among meerkats suggest that while helpers incur great short term costs, long term costs are minimal or non-existent. Help by allomothers can be conditional upon health at the onset of the reproductive cycle, such as weight in meerkats, and helpers are able to modify their behavior to offset some of the short-term costs, i.e., increased time spent foraging and alternate breeding cycles in which they help. Cockburn shows that helpers among birds may benefit from increased numbers of non-descendant kin, increased access to territory and resources, increased access to mating options, increases in social status and longer time to acquire skills.

Cooperative breeding is common in many mammal species, but the type of care can vary greatly. Isler and van Shaik's survey allomothering in placental mammals found that 46% engaged in no help, 10% only provided protection, 3% provided only allonursing, 24% provided all forms of help other than provisioning and 16% provided complete help, including provisioning (see Figure 1, pg. 55). Allomaternal help with provisioning was most common among members of Carnivora and Primates. The study also looked at correlations of allomaternal care and brain size, finding mixed results among many of the orders, however among Carnivora there was a correlation between male help and brain size and in Primates there was a correlation between allonursing and brain size. It has also been demonstrated that increases in allomothering among chimps is associated with a reduction in lactation efforts and shorter weaning times. Hrdy argues that in order for cooperative breeding to occur, the underlying neural circuitry must be present in both sexes as well as pre- and post-reproductive aged individuals. This neurocircuitry includes a tendency to be attracted to, hold and protect infants, all of which are common among primates in various degrees.

== Evolution among humans ==
Humans produce offspring that develop slowly and are incapable of moving or retrieving food for a lengthy period after birth. In animals that have infant altriciality and extended development, interbirth intervals are often longer to allow the mother to fully invest in one offspring before conceiving another. However, humans do not follow the pattern seen in other apes: human life history features relatively short interbirth intervals resulting in child-rearing costs that the mother alone cannot provide. Allomaternal care is a universal feature of human reproduction that helps provide additional childcare and other resources for the parents. While short interbirth intervals can negatively impact child outcomes, increasing the risk of child mortality, allomaternal care can reduce these negative outcomes while allowing interbirth intervals to remain short. When compared to other living primates, humans have short interbirth intervals (IBI), averaging 3.1 years in natural fertility populations, and total fertility rates (TFR) of 6.1 offspring versus interbirth intervals and total fertility rates for chimpanzees (IBI = 5.5, TFR = 2), gorillas (IBI = 3.9, TFR = 3) and orangutans (IBI = 9.2). Humans also have a unique period in their prolonged dependency, childhood, which allows for increased development and social learning.

The emergence of cooperative breeding in early hominins may explain several key life history traits such as larger brains and our demographic success around the globe. Isler and van Schaik analyzed life history traits such as first age of reproduction and interbirth intervals in primates and applied the resulting data to ancestral hominins and determined that without cooperative breeding the first age of reproduction for Australopithecus afarensis would be around 12.6 years and for Qafzeh Homo sapiens around 26.1 years. The predicted interbirth intervals would range from 6 to 8.4 years. Assuming some form or allomaternal care as early as A. afarensis, first age of reproduction comes down to 10.9 years and interbirth intervals are reduced to approximately 3.4 years. For Qafzeh H. sapiens, first age of reproduction is reduced to 22.6 years and interbirth intervals are around 4.7 years. Based on their study, Isler and van Shaik conclude that a change in lifestyle resulting in substantial increases in allomothering occurred early in the Homo genus. This implies that cooperative breeding has been an important part of human history for nearly two million years.

Demographic reconstructions of hunter-gatherer populations in the Pleistocene attempt to analyze the probability of having allomothers in a community and rely on assumptions about residential patterns in early humans. Kurland and Sparks (pers. comm. In Hrdy, 2006) provide estimates of several relatives' presence assuming different mortality rates. Under low mortality rates, the chance of primipara, a woman giving birth to her first child, having her mother around is around 50% and under high mortality rates the chance drops to 25%. The chance of having an older sibling around is much higher, as are the chances of having cousins. While this indicates that a new mother would have a least some close kin nearby to help with childcare, residential patterns may change these likelihoods. If humans were majority patrilocal, where males remain in natal groups and females disperse, we would expect lower maternal kin available for allomaternal assistance. This suggesting that mothers would need to rely more on paternal kin and unrelated individuals as potential allomothers, or for at least some of the mother's kin to temporarily reside with the parents during periods of high need. However, we know that humans are ambilocal or bilocal, meaning either males or females may disperse, which can impact the availability of maternal or paternal kin. Bilocality may have led to the diverse use of both kin and non-kin as allomothers in humans. Allomothering appears to also be tied to the environment, with increased levels of allomothering seen in regions of reduced climate predictability and lower average temperatures and precipitation.

=== Cognitive & hormonal implications ===
Human females respond to social conditions during and immediately after pregnancy and may decide to abandon, neglect or commit infanticide if social support is lacking, if the infant is not considered viable (low birth weight, twins) or under certain extreme conditions (such as famine). Nearly all individuals show a response to infant crying and laughing, including fathers, virgin females, older children and even strangers. Oxytocin and prolactin, hormones released by mothers during lactation that may facilitate bonding, are also produced by males and others in the presence of a crying infant.

Infants appear to have coevolved adaptations in response to those in older children and adults. Infants that look healthier (larger or plump) have higher rates of survival. Newborn humans are also predisposed to seek out faces and will imitate faces they see or respond to attention by smiling and laughing. Smiling and laughing appears to be an attempt to draw in potential allomothers, as well as a way to bond with parents. Likewise, older infants can learn the intentions of others. Humans show advanced theory of mind and the ability to read and predict others' behavior and point of view may be impart due to the high levels of allomothering seen in humans. Early infants engage other humans through laughter, they quickly learn to discriminate between those that show them more attention and care for them, indicating that they possess a quickly understanding who intends to care for them. Also, there is evidence for cognitive and socialization implications in nonhuman primates' allomothering.

=== Emotional health implications ===
Allomothering can be helpful in the emotional health of both mother and infants

Mothers:

About the mothers, it is shown that the mothers' social network and supports that are provided through the cooperative breeding system or "availability of others" may mitigate not only the burden of physical pregnancy but also the psychological and emotional burden of motherhood. This reduced pressure on mothers contributes to the improvement of their well-being and parental investment. It is shown that a lack of support from social networks would lead mothers to abandon their children and increase the risk of postpartum depression. In this vein, Hagen (1999) suggested that post-partum depression might help mothers to show their need for social support. For example, research showed that the emotional support of infants' maternal grandmothers was associated with less depression in the mothers. In this study, the interesting finding was that the positive influence of maternal grandmothers' support in decreasing mothers' depression risk was not related to the geographic proximity of the grandmothers.

Infants:

Mothers' post-partum depression can cause reduced parental investment and not responding to infants' cues for their needs. As a result, the ignorance of infants' cues can affect their secure attachment and cognitive functions. Hence, the caregiving network can decrease these negative consequences.

Cameron (1998) mentioned that in mammals generally, some mammals' offspring may suckle the breast for soothing in distressed situations rather than/ as well as for nutritive purposes. Then, Hewlett and Winn suggested that the need for soothing in the distressed situation may be a reason for the evolution of allo-maternal breast suckling (allo-nursing/ allo-suckling) although this is less accepted than the other potential proposed explanations of allomothering.

=== Immunity implications ===
The allo-nursing specifically discusses the idea of breastfeeding other individuals' offspring of both kin and non-kin. Since allo-nursing is costly for females, there have been many hypotheses to explain the possible reasons for its evolution. One of the hypotheses is the "neuroendocrine function of allosuckling "(NFA).

Based on NFA, both infants, and allo-mothers can benefit from the function of allo-nursing. For example, as a benefit for the allo-nursers, an infant, through suckling, can stimulate the nipple to produce prolactin. Prolactin production can cause fertility suppression and immune system improvement in allonursers. In addition, prohibiting fertility can be beneficial for females and their own offspring especially when their own infants do not stimulate their mothers' nipples.

This hypothesis also predicts that allo-nursing with the increased prolactin and its positive consequences in the immune system in allonursers, are more common in mammals living in an environmental setting with a higher load of parasites.

Infants also can be provided by different bacteria through being breastfed by allo-mother/s. The bacteria can be transmitted by skin-to-skin contact and by milk through the process of allo-nursing. Indeed, there is a critical period in infants' development in which the gastrointestinal is colonized by bacteria to shape the gastrointestinal microbiome (GIM). Regarding hygiene and the related hypothesis including the old friends' hypothesis, it is shown that this period of colonization is critical because colonization helps the development and education of the immune system.

Human milk microbiome (HMM) is found to be important for the colonization of GIM and consequently for the development of the immune system in infants because during the critical period, HMM is the first and most reliable source of bacteria, and this modulates the immune system of infants.

Studies on small-scale societies including foragers (hunter-gatherer) and horticulturalists, showed that allo-nursing is more common among forager women who live in tropical environments (with higher loads of parasites and bacterial infections) than the more arid environment in which infectious diseases are lower.

In the tropical environment, most of the death in small-scale societies is because of parasite, bacterial, viral infectious diseases. Some of these tropical forager societies in which allo-mothering nursing is common are the Ache, Bofi, Agta, Aka, Efe´, Chabu, and Onge´e but it is not common in the forager societies like the Nayaka, Hadza, Paliyan, Martu and !Kung who live in the non-tropical area.

However, the studies showed some exception in horticulturalist in tropical area like Ngandu in which the allo-nursing is discouraged and researchers believe that it may be due to the knowledge about increasing possibility of common infection transmission through breastfeeding in their populated villages. Yet, for the Aka people the primary reason of death is parasite not transmission of other infections. Therefore, allo-nursing, due to NFS and its immunological positive consequences, can benefit Aka women and benefits of allo-nursing may be higher than the cost of infection transmissions.

Furthermore, the size and frequency of caregiving network existing in allo-mothering practices can affect the diversity and bacterial composition of human milk and this may influence infants' immune system and health. The research that has addressed the relationship between HMM and infants' immunity, emphasis the need for more studies since the interaction between the microbes and immunology is complicated.

== Allomothering by kin ==
Hrdy states that the altruism of allomothers can be explained by Hamilton's rule and therefore allomothers enhance their inclusive fitness by helping kin. However, in humans, bilocality and complex cultural norms around marriage or mating produce groups that may not be highly related suggesting that allomothering is not limited to kin. Despite varying and complex residential patterns, kin do appear to be strong sources of allomaternal care in many societies. Fathers, grandparents, older siblings and other close kin help in childcare, provisioning, protection and education.

Allomothers are perhaps less important immediately after birth. Infants rely on the mother for milk to survive and mothers benefit from food provisioning by the fathers to produce sufficient amounts of milk for their infants. Infants whose mother's die during childbirth have a low probability of survival, between 1 and 5% in some pre-demographic transition populations, higher in post-demographic transition populations. If the mother dies during the first year of life the chance of survival increase to 35–50%, and the effect of the mother's death nearly disappears after the child reaches two. This indicates the important of parents during the first couple of years of life, but also demonstrates that once weaning is complete, allomothers are capable of rearing children to adulthood.

=== Fathers ===
The importance of fathers varies considerably, but many authors now agree that there is little impact on child survival from the loss of a father. Sear and Mace's study of 15 populations found that in 53%, the death of the father was not correlated with an increase in child mortality. The father does not directly feed an infant and it is possible that other males of the family or community can step in if something happens to the father. Kramer's (2010) cross-cultural study found that in direct allomaternal care provided by fathers varies from less than 1% (Alyawara) to nearly 16% (Aka) with an average of 4.8% across the populations studied. However, in many societies the father does play an important role. Among the Ache of South America, the loss of the father did affect the child's survival. Meat sharing by hunters is an important part of Ache life and, while the majority of the meat acquired by a male may not go directly to the family, it is used to build relations and exchange for other goods. Interestingly, the father is not very involved in childcare among the Ache. The same study found that among the Hiwi (also of South America), where the father does provide direct childcare and food provisioning, the death of the father had no effect on child survival.

A father's most important contribution to children may be providing protection from other males, especially in groups that practice infanticide. Sear and Mace point out that many of the populations in the study look at the impact of the loss of a father on young children and suggest that since a father cannot provide direct nourishment to breastfeeding children, their importance may come later in the child's life. Fathers teach subsistence strategies to older children (for example, teaching hunting and trapping skills to older boys in hunter-gatherer societies). Allal et al. found that the marriage and fertility of women who do not have fathers may be impacted. Some hunter-gather populations in South America also have "partible paternity", the idea that multiple men can impregnate a woman and all are considered the father, which could provide "back-up" fathers to children.

=== Grandparents ===
Grandmothers can care for children freeing the mother to engage in foraging or economic activities, or in the care of a child that has not been weaned. Likewise, grandmothers often continue to forage late in life to help with food provisioning for their grandchildren and a lactating mother. Child mortality in rural Gambia saw a significant decline when the maternal grandmother was present (see Table 4). In a comparison of nine populations on the proportion of direct childcare received by a child, Kramer found that grandmothers accounted for between 1.2% (Maya) and 14.3% (Mardu) of the total childcare. Sear and Mace determine that grandmothers do not have a universally positive effect on child survival and there is a difference between maternal and paternal grandmothers. Maternal grandmothers improved child survival in 69% of cases while paternal grandmothers improved survival in only 53% of observed cases. They also found that paternal grandmothers were detrimental in two cases and maternal grandmothers in one. Paternal grandmothers may on average be older than maternal grandmothers, due to common age differences in males and females at first reproduction. Paternal grandmothers may also be more reluctant to invest in their grandchildren due to the lack of certainty of paternity. The same study also found the timing of impact of paternal and maternal grandmothers varies, with maternal grandmothers having greater effects after the first year of life (allomaternal care) and paternal grandmothers having greater effects during pregnancy and in the first few months of a child's life (help with tasks during pregnancy or causing high levels of stress to the mother during pregnancy).

Grandfathers do not appear to be important sources of allomaternal care, with maternal grandfathers having no impact on child survival in 83% of cases and paternal grandfathers having no impact on 50% and a negative impact on 25% of cases. Little explanation on why grandfathers contributed less to childcare was found in the anthropological literature. It is possible that the even greater age of a grandfather when compared to grandmothers made it difficult to help with childrearing. In addition, grandfathers, like fathers, may contribute primarily through food provisioning, however the late age of the grandfather is likely to be well passed his hunting prime.

==== Grandmother hypothesis ====
Grandmothers are often considered a significant source of allomaternal care and this fact has led to the "grandmother hypothesis", suggesting that women developed long post-menopausal periods to help with their children's offspring. This long lifespan after menopause is unique to humans and may help explain early weaning and high fertility rates. Hill and Hurtado argue that early reproductive senescence in females is an evolutionary dilemma since natural selection should favor continued reproduction. They test the grandmother hypothesis with data collected from the Ache and determine it does not support the idea that early menopause is maintained by natural selection favoring women who stop reproduction in order to invest more in their grandchildren. Despite Hill and Hurtado's finding, grandmothers often account for a much of the allomaternal care seen in a variety of societies.

=== Siblings ===
Older siblings may be the greatest source of allomaternal care among kin. Kramer's (see Table 1) comparison of nine populations found that siblings accounted for between 1.1% and 33% of the direct childcare received by a child. Older sisters appear to be more important than brothers for many of the groups in the study with sisters ranging from 5% to 33% and brothers 1.1% to 16.3%. Ivey (see Figures 1 & 2) found that among the Efe, both sisters and brothers contributed significantly to childcare. Sear and Mace found that five of the six studies indicated that child mortality increased survival of younger siblings. Older siblings, while still dependent on their parents. can engage in a variety of useful tasks depending on their age. It is possible that dependence on adult allomothers was not an early selective pressure for the development of allomothering in humans, but rather maternal – juvenile cooperation likely played a more important role.

Older sisters often engage in childcare, helping to look after younger siblings. This is apparently true regardless of subsistence strategy; and holds true even for Industrial societies. Kramer (see Figure 4) shows a cross cultural comparison of children in ten societies, all of whom engage in at least some childcare of younger siblings. Equally important, older children can help offset their own cost by engaging in foraging or economic actives. The same figure from Kramer shows that all of the groups engaged in more economic work than childcare. Kramer (see Figure 2) compares groups organized by subsistence strategy and shows that foraging and economic work are common among foragers, horticulturalists, agriculturalists and pastoralists, with the latter two groups showing some of the highest rates of food production and domestic tasks by children.

=== Extended family ===
Other kin may be sources of allomothers when present, however evidence from the ethnographic literature demonstrates varied amounts of contribution and different impacts on the children. Aunts' and uncles' contribution varies depending on residential patterns, inheritance patterns and resource allocation. Among the Kipsigis of Kenya, a child's paternal uncle had a positive effect on reducing child mortality in the richer half of the sample but not on the poorer half, however for maternal uncles the effects were reversed with poorer families showing a greater reduction in child mortality. Local resource competition, namely conflict over land inheritance among the father's brothers appears to account for the pattern of paternal kin effects. Others have found that the maternal aunts have similar effects in societies with female inheritance. Efe infants spend a significant amount of time in the care of aunts and male cousins.

== Allomothering by non-kin ==
Studies of extant hunter-gatherer groups demonstrates that groups are composed of more than just direct kin, with 25–50% of group members as unrelated or distantly related. Using modern hunter-gatherers as representatives of past hunter-gathers is not a perfect analogy, the data in combination with archaeological and paleoanthropological evidence are the only sources of information we can use to reconstruct past groups. It is likely that past hunter-gatherer groups were also composed of a mixture of related (kin) and unrelated (non kin) individuals meaning that allomothering by non kin occurred in at least some past societies. Research with contemporary hunter-gatherers, horticulturalists, and modern, industrial societies often finds that non-kin – friends, neighbors, and fictive kin – provide allomaternal care.

Surrogate breast feeders, known as a wet nurses in Western medical literature, may have played an important role as allomothers prior to the introduction of bottle feeding and formula. Wet nursing was recorded in ancient Israel and Egypt, among historical and modern Sunni Arab populations, as well as in ancient India and Greece. While the frequency of wet nurses has been debated, there is ample references in the literature to suggest that is did occur (and in some societies still does).

Religion and religious communities may also increase the frequency of allomothering. Studies of religious communities in England and New Zealand show increased allomaternal care by unrelated members of the community. Religion is thought to increase prosocial behavior with religiosity being a costly signal that indicates to other members that a practicing individual is trustworthy and likely to cooperate and reciprocate. Israeli kibbutz are collective settlements where members share almost all aspects of their lives: all incomes are given to the kibbutz an in return the kibbutz distributes goods and services equally, they dine in communal dining halls and childcare is communal. Children live in a communal nursery and later group houses together. Parenting is also distributed among the community; perhaps an extreme form of allomothering.

Fictive kin are unrelated individuals that have kinship terms bestowed on them. There are generally two types of fictive kin: named kin, determined by factors such as age, gender and prestige and applied to a large number of community members (such as in Northern India), and ritual kin, named at a specific ceremony, such as baptism, at which time the relationship between the individual undergoing the ceremony and the named kin is formalized. Named kin may function similarly to religious communities by increasing familiarity and increasing prosocial behavior, however little research appears to have been conducted on this form of fictive kin. Godparents are one of the better-known ritual kin systems in Western culture. Godparents are common to Catholic (and other Christian) communities in Europe and throughout the Americas (due to colonization). Godparents are expected to provide extra resources to the family; naming a godparent creates a strong bond within the community or a tie to an outside community where new resources may be accessible in times of need. Other examples of ritual kin are milk kin in some Arab societies and the Japanese oyabun-kobun system.

In a literature review of alloparental care, Kenkel et al. found that children are between six and hundred times more likely to die from abuse while under the care of unrelated adults in modern societies, however they also state that the term alloparenting is often omitted from studies on modern populations resulting in "blind spots" in the literature.

== In urban/industrial societies ==
The nuclear family has dominated U.S. and some European populations life for many decades. The typical family is often thought of as two parents and their children living in one house. However, a recent poll by the Pew Research Center shows a rise in the number of U.S. Americans living in multigenerational homes, from a low of 12% in 1980 to 20% in 2016. The growing price of housing in the U.S. and the overall rise in the cost of living has made owning homes and living as a nuclear family more difficult. It is once again becoming common for grandparents to live in the same house as their grandchildren, providing a source of childcare for the families. Urban areas in China also show that while two generation and single parent households are on the rise, however the extended family still represents the majority of Chinese households. Older siblings in most modern, industrialized are required to attend school, possibly eliminating a source of allomothering, it appears that grandmothers still play an important role in childcare.

Wet nursing may still be an option in some societies. The Arab populations previously mentioned still have wet nurses but the occurrence is quickly declining, however modern technologies like formula and breast pumps have made it unnecessary in populations with access to those technology. Ritual kin systems, such as godparents and the oyabun-kobun system, are also still active in their respective societies and may still function as a source of allomaternal care. Religious communities within modern societies are still relevant as Shaver et al. has shown in their studies in England and New Zealand.

In industrialized, urban societies daycare, school, nannies, etc. may provide many of the same benefits that would have traditionally been provided by kin and well-known community members. It is possible for parents in urban areas to enroll in daycare as soon as weaning is complete (sometimes early with breast-pumping technology) and as long as resources or finances permit, the child could be looked after for the duration of the day. The cost of these services may be prohibitive to many low-income families, creating a divide in allomaternal care depending on income. It is also unclear whether the primary role of a service such as daycare is to allow for more attention to producing more children or allowing parents to pursue other endeavors (careers). The research into daycare as a form of allomothering may be complicated by its cost and other limitations to access. Daycare may be more common among wealthy and/or higher educated individuals who are less likely to have children out of choice, meaning discerning impact on interbirth intervals or other metrics may be challenging.

Allomothering is still relevant in most industrialized societies, even if the source has shifted. Reliance on extended family may have fallen, but recently is on the rise, and more use of paid childcare system such as daycare or compulsory systems such as schooling fill in some of the gaps that occur from living in a mobile, globalized, industrial society.

== Critiques ==
There are a couple of critiques to consider related to cooperative breeding and allomothering in humans. The first is proposed by Bogin et al. in which they argue that humans are not actually cooperative breeders. The authors argue that because allomothering and provisioning are not based on genetic relatedness, as most other cooperative breeders are, the term needs to be modified to incorporate the wider range of behavior seen in humans. They propose the term "biocultural reproduction" that they believe better describes the high amount of allomothering by kin and non kin, and accounts for the variation in allomothering practices seen from culture to culture in humans. This critique does not apply specifically to allomothering as discussed in this article, but rather to the reproductive strategy system that incorporates it.

The second critique relevant to allomothering concerns human kinship distinctions. Schneider, along with other anthropologists, have argued that distinguishing between real and fictive kin does not always occur in human cultures and perhaps should be abandoned. The critique may be misunderstood to mean that humans cannot tell the difference between related and unrelated individuals. Maternity in humans, like many other animals, is known and the mother's female relatives relatedness can be assumed by individuals with relative certainty. Humans are also unique as fairly stable pair-bonding allows for some degree of paternal certainty. In fact, Chapais argues that patrilineal kinship is a prerequisite for the flexibility of residential patterns seen in humans and this kinship is not culturally based but has a deep biological substrate upon which it is built. Gintis and Chapais arguments suggest that while kinship terms are often applied to individuals outside of related individuals, the relatedness of those individuals is known. A distinction is still useful and we see a difference in the contribution of allomothering by related versus unrelated individuals in many, if not most populations.
