= Reproductive compensation =

Theory about recessive genetic disorders

Reproductive compensation was originally a theory to explain why recessive genetic disorders may persist in a population. It was proposed in 1967 as an explanation for the maintenance of Rh negative blood groups. Reproductive compensation refers to the tendency of parents, seeking a given family size, to replace offspring that are lost to genetic disorders. It may also refer to the effects of increased maternal or parental investment in caring for disadvantaged offspring, seeking to compensate for genetic disadvantage. It is a theory that suggests that behavioral as well as physiological factors may play a role in the level of recessive genetic disorders in a population.

According to Andrew Overall of the University of Edinburgh, "Reproductive compensation may be particularly significant where economic or social factors mean that families are small compared to the maximum reproductive rate. Within small families, diseased infants may be more likely to be replaced. As a consequence, parents with otherwise reduced fertility have a greater influence on the frequency of recessive alleles in future generations."

Ian Hastings has argued that reproductive technologies such as embryo sex selection, preimplantation genetic diagnosis with in vitro fertilization, and selective termination of pregnancy may increase the frequency of genetic disorders through reproductive compensation.

More recently the reproductive compensation hypothesis has been generalized to include, not only recessive genetic disorders, but in a more general sense, the effects of parental compensation when mate selection or breeding take place under constraints. According to Patricia Adair Gowaty, "The reproductive compensation hypothesis says that individuals constrained by ecological or social forces to reproduce with partners they do not prefer compensate for likely offspring viability deficits." In human societies, such constraints include the manipulation of female mating options, forced copulation, arranged marriages, assortative mating, and the trading of copulation for access to resources.

Whereas heterozygote advantage can explain the persistence of high carrier rates of lethal alleles in certain regions (e.g. sickle-cell disease in Central and West Africa), Johan Koeslag and Stephen Schach have suggested that reproductive compensation might explain why different communities have high carrier rates for differing lethal alleles, despite living in similar or sometimes the same environment. Examples are Tay–Sachs disease amongst Ashkenazi Jews, cystic fibrosis amongst people of West European origin, and phenylketonuria among persons from Ireland.
