= Cooperative breeding =

Social system

Cooperative breeding is a social system characterized by alloparental care: offspring receive care not only from their parents, but also from additional group members, often called helpers. Cooperative breeding encompasses a wide variety of group structures, from a breeding pair with helpers that are offspring from a previous season, to groups with multiple breeding males and females (polygynandry) and helpers that are the adult offspring of some but not all of the breeders in the group, to groups in which helpers sometimes achieve co-breeding status by producing their own offspring as part of the group's brood. Cooperative breeding occurs across taxonomic groups including birds, mammals, fish, and insects.

Costs for helpers include a fitness reduction, increased territory defense, offspring guarding and an increased cost of growth. Benefits for helpers include a reduced chance of predation, increased foraging time, territory inheritance, increased environmental conditions and an inclusive fitness. Inclusive fitness is the sum of all direct and indirect fitness, where direct fitness is defined as the amount of fitness gained through producing offspring. Indirect fitness is defined as the amount of fitness gained through aiding the offspring of related individuals, that is, relatives are able to indirectly pass on their genes through increasing the fitness of related offspring. This is also called kin selection.

For the breeding pair, costs include increased mate guarding and suppression of subordinate mating. Breeders receive benefits as reductions in offspring care and territory maintenance. Their primary benefit is an increased reproductive rate and survival.

Cooperative breeding causes the reproductive success of all sexually mature adults to be skewed towards one mating pair. This means the reproductive fitness of the group is held within a select few breeding members and helpers have little to no reproductive fitness. With this system, breeders gain an increased reproductive fitness, while helpers gain an increased inclusive fitness.

== Evolution ==
Many hypotheses have been presented to explain the evolution of cooperative breeding. The concept behind cooperative breeding is the forfeiting of an individual's reproductive fitness to aid the reproductive success of others. This concept is hard to understand and the evolution of cooperative breeding is important, but difficult to explain. Most hypotheses aim to determine the reason helpers selectively reduce their fitness and take on an alloparental role.

Kin selection is the evolutionary strategy of aiding the reproductive success of related organisms, even at a cost to the own individual's direct fitness. Hamilton's rule (rB−C>0) explains that kin selection will exist if the genetic relatedness (r) of the aided recipient to the aiding individual, times the benefit to the aid recipient (B) is greater than the cost to the aiding individual (C). For example, the chestnut-crowned babbler (Pomatostomus ruficeps) has been found to have high rates of kin selection. Helpers are predominantly found aiding closely related broods over nonrelated broods. Additional species such as Neolamprologus pulcher have shown that kin selection is a dominant driving force for cooperative breeding.

Group augmentation presents a second hypothesis towards the evolution of cooperative breeding. This hypothesis suggests that increasing the size of the group through the addition of helpers aids in individual survival and may increase the helper's future breeding success. Group augmentation is favored if the grouping provides passive benefits for helpers in addition to inclusive fitness. By group augmenting, each individual member reduces their chances of becoming a victim of predation. Additionally, an increase in members reduces each helper's duration as a sentinel (standing upon a high surface to survey for predators) or babysitting (guarding the offspring and den). The reduction in these guarding behaviors enables helpers to forage for longer periods.

Lukas et al. proposed an evolutionary model for cooperative breeding, which linked the coevolution of polytocy, production of multiple offspring, and monotocy, production of single offspring, with the evolution of cooperative breeding. The model is based on the evolution of larger litters forcing the need for helpers to maintain the high reproductive costs, thus leading to cooperative breeding. Lukas et al. suggests polytocy may have encouraged the evolution of cooperative breeding. Their proposed model suggests the transition from monotocy to polytocy is favorable. Additionally, they found the transition from polytocy without cooperative breeding to polytocy with cooperative breeding is highly favorable. This suggests cooperative breeding evolved from noncooperative breeding monotocy to cooperative breeding polytocy.

Today, there is growing support for the theory that cooperative breeding evolved by means of some form of mutualism or reciprocity. Mutualism is a form of symbiosis that is beneficial to both involved organisms. Mutualism has many forms and can occur when the benefits are immediate or deferred, when individuals exchange beneficial behaviors in turn, or when a group of individuals contribute to a common good, where it may be advantageous for all group members to help raise young. When a group raises young together, it may be advantageous because it maintains or increases the size of the group. The greatest amount of research has been invested in reciprocal exchanges of beneficial behavior through the iterated prisoner's dilemma. In this model, two partners can either cooperate and exchange beneficial behavior or they can defect and refuse to help the other individual.

== Environmental conditions ==
Environmental conditions govern whether offspring disperse from their natal group or remain as helpers. Food or territory availability can encourage individuals to disperse and establish new breeding territories, but unfavorable conditions promote offspring to remain at the natal territory and become helpers to obtain an inclusive fitness. Additionally, remaining at the natal territory enables offspring to possibly inherit the breeding role and/or territory of their parents.

A final factor influencing cooperative breeding is sexual dispersal. Sexual dispersal is the movement of one sex, male or female, from the natal territory to establish new breeding grounds. This is highly regulated by the reproductive costs in producing a male versus a female offspring. Maternal investment within female offspring may be considerably higher than male offspring for one species, or vice versa for another. During unfavorable conditions the cheaper sex will be produced at higher ratios.

A second factor affecting the sexual dispersal is the difference in ability of each sex to establish a new breeding territory. Carrion crow (Corvus corone) were found to produce more female offspring in favorable environmental conditions. Female Corvus corone have been found to establish successful breeding territories at a higher rate than males. Male Corvus corone were produced at a higher rate under unfavorable conditions. Males were found to remain at the natal territory and become helpers. Thus, if environmental conditions favor the dispersal of a specific sex it is considered the dispersal sex. If environmental conditions are unfavorable females may produce the philopatric sex, therefore generating more helpers and increasing the occurrence of cooperative breeding.

== Costs ==
=== Breeders ===
Breeder costs consist of prenatal care, postnatal care and maintenance of breeding status. Prenatal care is the amount of maternal investment during fetus gestation and postnatal care is the investment following birth. Examples of prenatal care are fetal, placentae, uterus and mammary tissue development. Postnatal examples are lactation, food provisions and guarding behavior.

Dominant males and females exhibit suppressive behaviors towards subordinates to maintain their breeding status. These suppressive acts are dependent upon the sex ratio of helpers. Therefore, the costs will be altered depending upon the helpers. For example, if there are more male helpers as compared to females, then the dominant male will suppress subordinate males and experience a higher cost. The opposite is true for females. Breeders will even suppress subordinates from mating with other subordinates.

=== Helpers ===
The cost to helpers varies depending upon presence or absence of related offspring. The presence of offspring has been found to increase the helper's cost by the helper contributing to guard behaviors. Guarding behaviors, such as babysitting, can cause individuals to experience weight loss on an exponential scale depending upon the duration of the activity. Other activities, such as sentinel behavior and bipedal surveillance, cause helpers to have reduced foraging intervals inhibiting their weight gains. The reduced foraging behavior and increased weight loss reduces their chance to breed successfully, but increases their inclusive fitness by increasing the survival of related offspring.

Helpers contribute depending upon the cost. The act of helping requires an allocation of energy towards actually performing the behavior. Prolonged allocation of energy may greatly impact a helper's growth. In banded mongoose (Mungos mungo) juvenile male helpers contribute far less than females. This is due to a difference in the age of sexual maturity. Female banded mongooses reach sexual maturity at one year of age, but males reach sexual maturity at two years of age. The difference in age causes the prolonged energy allocation to be detrimental to a specific sex.

Male juvenile Mungos mungo may reduce helping behaviors until sexual maturity is reached. Similarly, if there is a lack of food due to environmental conditions, such as reduced rainfall, the degree of helper input may be reduced greatly within juveniles. Adults may maintain their full activity because they are sexually mature.

Additionally, the costs of being a helper can be more detrimental to one sex. For example, territorial defense costs are generally male dependent and lactation is female dependent. Meerkats (Suricata suricatta) have exhibited male territory defense strategies, where male helpers will fend off intruding males to prevent such intruders from mating with subordinates or dominant females. Additionally, subordinate female pregnant helpers are sometimes exiled from the group by a dominant female. This eviction causes the subordinate female to have an abortion, which frees up resources such as lactation and energy that can be used to help the dominant female and her pups.

Rarely, a female helper or breeder will defend the territory while males are present. This suggests specific helping costs, such as territory defense, is rooted to one sex.

== Benefits ==
=== Breeders ===
Cooperative breeding reduces the costs of many maternal investments for breeding members. Helpers aid the breeding females with provisioning, lactation stress, guarding of offspring and prenatal investment. Increasing the number of helpers enables a breeding female or male to maintain a healthier physique, higher fitness, increased lifespan and brood size.

Female helpers can aid in lactation, but all helpers, male or female, can aid in food provisioning. Helper food provisioning reduces the need for the dominant breeding pair to return to the den, thus allowing them to forage for longer periods. The dominant female and male will adjust their care input, or food provisioning, depending on the degree of activity of the helpers.

The presence of helpers allows the breeding female to reduce her prenatal investment in the offspring, which may lead to altricial births; altricial is the production of young which are dependent upon adult aid to survive. This enables the breeding female to retain energy to be used within a new breeding attempt. Overall, the addition of helpers to a breeding pair encourages multiple reproductions per year, and increases the rate of successful reproduction.

Male breeders can benefit directly from reproducing with subordinate females and aiding in raising the young. This allows the male to obtain a "repayment investment" within these subordinate offspring. These offspring have a higher chance to become helpers once sexual maturity is reached. Thus, paying into their care will increase the dominant male's overall fitness in the future. This act ensures the dominant male subordinate helpers for future reproduction.

=== Helpers ===
Helpers primarily benefit from an inclusive fitness. Helpers maintain an inclusive fitness while aiding related breeders and offspring. This type of kinship may lead to inheritance of quality foraging and breeding territories, which will increase the future fitness of helpers. Additional, helpers experience an increased chance of being helped if they were once a helper.

Helpers may also benefit from group interactions, such as huddling for thermodynamic benefits. These interactions provide necessary elements to survive. They may also benefit from the increased group interaction on the level of cognitive concern for one another increasing their overall life span and survival.

Finally, helpers may derive inclusive fitness benefits from influencing the extra-pair behaviour of their parents. For example, by preventing their mothers from engaging in extra-pair matings, they can help their biological fathers protect their paternity and so increase their relatedness to future members of the cooperatively breeding group.

== Biological examples ==
=== Birds ===
Approximately eight percent of bird species are known to regularly engage in cooperative breeding, mainly among the Coraciiformes, Piciformes, basal Passeri and Sylvioidea. Only a small fraction of these, for instance the Australian mudnesters, Australo-Papuan babblers and ground hornbills, are however absolutely obligately cooperative and cannot fledge young without helpers.

The benefits of cooperative breeding in birds have been well-documented. One example is the azure-winged magpie (Cyanopica cyanus), in which studies found that the offspring's cell-mediated immune response was positively correlated with increase in the number of helpers at the nest. Studies on cooperative breeding in birds have also shown that high levels of cooperative breeding are strongly associated with low annual adult mortality and small clutch sizes, though it remains unclear whether cooperative breeding is a cause or consequence. It was originally suggested that cooperative breeding developed among bird species with low mortality rates as a consequence of "overcrowding" and thus fewer opportunities to claim territory and breed. However, many observers today believe cooperative breeding arose because of the need for helpers to rear young in the extremely infertile and unpredictable environments of Australia and sub-Saharan Africa under the rare favourable conditions.

=== Mammals ===
Across all mammalian species, less than 1% exhibit cooperative breeding strategies. Phylogenetic analysis shows evidence of fourteen discrete evolutionary transitions to cooperative breeding within the class Mammalia. These lineages are nine genera of rodents (Cryptomys, Heterocephalus, Microtus, Meriones, Rhabdomys, Castor, Atherurus and two in Peromyscus), four genera in Carnivora (Alopex, Canis, Lycaon, and in mongooses), and one genus of primates (Callitrichidae). Cooperative breeding in mammals is not limited to these stated lineages, rather they are significant evolutionary events that provide the framework for understanding the origins and evolutionary pressures of cooperative breeding. All of these evolutionary transitions have occurred in lineages that had a socially monogamous or solitary breeding system, suggesting that strong kinship ties are an essential factor in the evolutionary history of cooperative breeding. Additionally, polytocy, or the birth of multiple offspring per birthing episode, is a highly correlated evolutionary determinant of cooperative breeding in mammals. These two factors, social monogamy and polytocy, are not evolutionary associated, suggesting that they are independent mechanisms leading to the evolution of cooperative breeding in mammals. The global distribution of mammals with cooperative breeding systems is widespread across various climatic regions, but evidence shows that the initial transitions to cooperative breeding are associated to species in regions of high aridity.

==== Meerkats ====
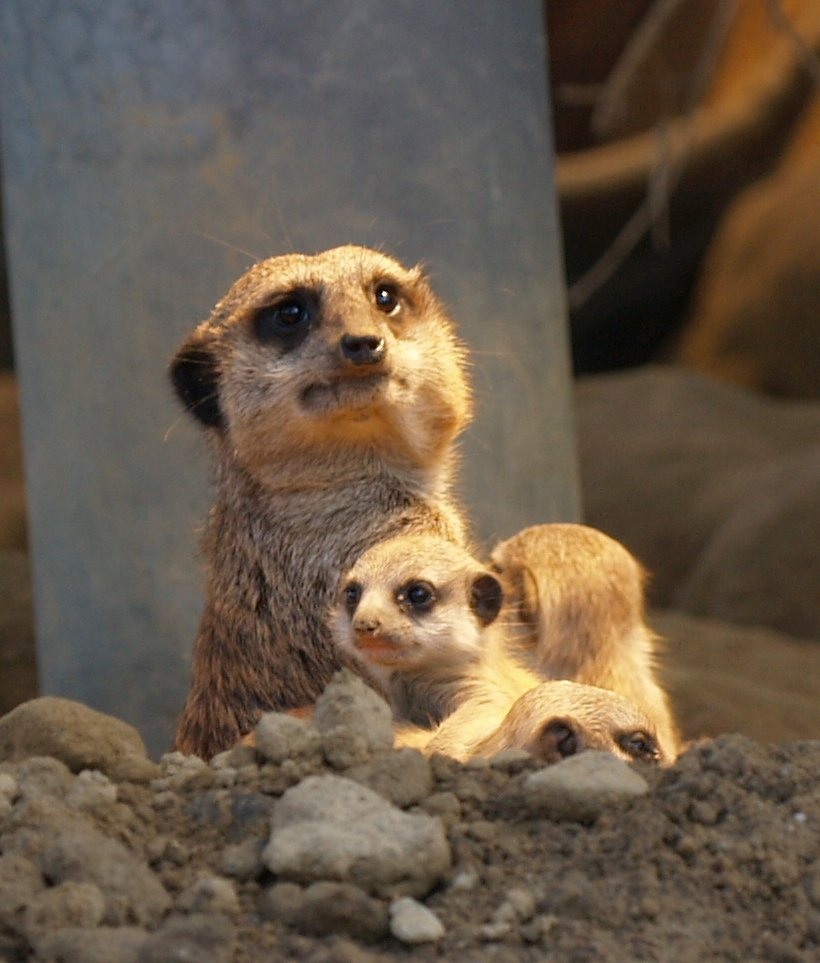
An older female watches over pups while alpha female is away.

Meerkats become reproductively active at one year of age and can have up to four litters per year. However, usually it is the alpha pair that reserves the right to mate and will usually kill any young that is not their own. While the alpha female is away from the group, females that have never reproduced lactate and hunt in order to feed the pups, as well as watch, protect, and defend them from predators. Although it was previously thought that a meerkat's contribution to a pup's diet depended on the degree of relatedness, it has been found that helpers vary in the number of food items they give to pups. This variation in food offering is due to variation in foraging success, sex, and age. Research has additionally found that the level of help is not correlated to the kinship of the litters they are rearing.

==== Canids ====
Cooperative breeding has been described in several canid species including red wolves, Arctic foxes and Ethiopian wolves.

Cooperative breeding increases the rate of reproduction in females and decreases the litter size.

==== Primates ====
Cooperative breeding entails one or more individuals, usually females, acting as "helpers" to one or a few dominant female breeders, usually helpers' kin. This sociosexual system is rare in primates, so far demonstrated among Neotropical callitricids, including marmosets and tamarins. Cooperative breeding requires "repression" of helpers' reproduction, by pheromones emitted by a breeder, by coercion, or by self-restraint. Sarah Blaffer Hrdy believes that cooperative breeding is an ancestral trait in humans, a controversial proposition. In most non-human primates, the reproductive success and survival of offspring is highly dependent to the mother's ability to produce food resources. Therefore, one component of cooperative breeding is the delegation of offspring holding, which allows the mother to forage without the added costs of holding her offspring. Additionally, in primate species with cooperative breeding systems, females have shorter interbirth intervals. Female grey mouse lemurs (Microcebus murinus) form social groups and cooperatively breed with closely related female kin. The females benefit from sharing limited nesting spaces and increased nest defense but do not exhibit food provisioning behaviors as they are solitary foragers.

==== Humans ====
Direct expression of cooperative breeding includes facultative parental care, including alloparenting, and extended post-menopausal lifespan in females, which forms the basis of the Grandmother Hypothesis. Cooperative breeding in humans is theorized as the optimal solution to high energetic costs of survival due to nature of human diet, which involved high-quality foods often in need of processing and cooking. Additionally, food provisioning in cooperate breeding societies may explain the relatively short period of weaning in humans, typically two to three years, when compared to non-human apes who wean their offspring for upwards of six years.

Human offspring do not fall neatly into the dichotomous categorization of precocial versus altricial, and instead Portmann proposes they are "secondarily altricial" at birth due to the underdevelopment of neurological and cognitive capabilities. Therefore, human offspring are highly dependent on caregiver investment, a necessity that serves as the precursor for theories on the development of pair-bonding, alloparenting, and cooperative breeding. The evolution of cooperative breeding in early Homo species also promoted other pro-social behaviors such as social learning, increased social tolerance, and shared intentionality especially in food acquisition. Additionally, pro-social behaviors in cooperative breeding in humans had a by-product effect of enhancing cognitive capabilities, especially in social tasks involving coordination.

Human mothers tend to have overlapping, dependent offspring due to shorter interbirth intervals, high fertility rates, and low infant mortality rates, thus imposing high energetic costs. Unlike other species with cooperative breeding systems, human female "helpers" do not incur the cost of reproductive suppression at the benefit of a single, dominant breeding mother. Instead, cooperative breeding is highly prevalent among grandparents, and juveniles, who are generally not competing for mating opportunities. This intergenerational flow of resources supports the theory of mutualism as an evolutionary pathway to cooperative breeding in humans.
