= Sarah Blaffer Hrdy =

American anthropologist and primatologist

Sarah Hrdy
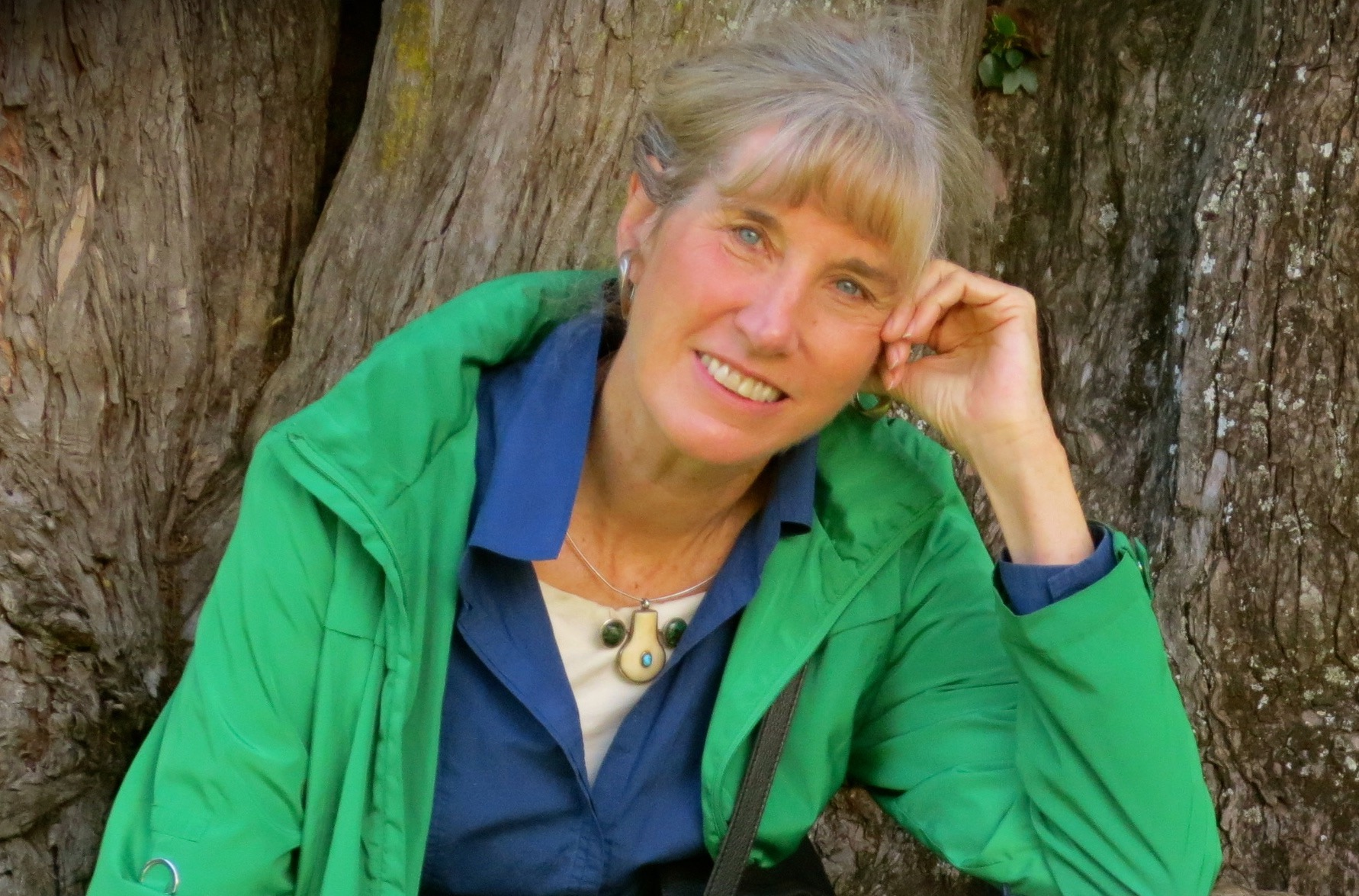
- Born: Sarah Blaffer; July 11, 1946 (age 80); Dallas, Texas, U.S.
- Education: Radcliffe College (BA); Harvard University (PhD)
- Awards: Lifetime Career Award, Human Behavior and Evolution Society
- Scientific career
- Fields: Anthropology and primatology
- Workplaces: University of California, Davis
- Doctoral advisor: Irven DeVore

Sarah Hrdy (née Blaffer; born July 11, 1946) is an American anthropologist and primatologist who has made major contributions to evolutionary psychology and sociobiology. She is considered "a highly recognized pioneer in modernizing our understanding of the evolutionary basis of female behavior in both nonhuman and human primates". She is also considered an important figure in Darwinian feminism. In 2013, Hrdy received a Lifetime Career Award for Distinguished Scientific Contribution from the Human Behavior and Evolution Society.

Hrdy is a Professor Emerita of the Department of Anthropology at the University of California, Davis. She has also been an Associate at the Peabody Museum of Archaeology and Ethnology at Harvard University. She has been selected as one of the 21 Leaders in Animal Behavior (2009). In acknowledgment of her achievements, Discover magazine recognized her in 2002 as one of the 50 most important women in science.

== Biography ==
=== Early life ===
Sarah Blaffer was born on July 11, 1946, in Dallas, Texas. She was a granddaughter of Sarah Campbell Blaffer and Robert Lee Blaffer, a co-founder of Humble Oil. She was raised in Houston and attended St. John's School before enrolling in St. Timothy's School in Stevenson, Maryland, graduating in 1964.

=== Education ===
At age 18, Blaffer enrolled in her mother's alma mater, Wellesley College in Massachusetts. At the end of her sophomore year, she transferred to Radcliffe College, then the women's part of Harvard, in order to study under the well-known anthropologist and Mayanist, Evon Z. Vogt.

Majoring in anthropology there her undergraduate honors thesis was on the hypersexual Tzotzil Maya demon H'ik'al, published as her first book, The Black-man of Zinacantan, in 1972. She was a member of Phi Beta Kappa, and graduated summa cum laude from Radcliffe in 1969 with a BA.

Interested in making public health films for people in developing countries, Hrdy took film-making courses at Stanford, but was disappointed with them. Instead she was inspired by a Stanford lecture of Paul Ehrlich's about overpopulation. His lecture reminded her of something a Harvard professor, Irven DeVore, had said about a species of Indian monkey called langurs among whom males, supposedly because they were crowded, killed infants.

Hrdy changed course in mid-year and entered Harvard as a graduate student in 1970 to study primate behavior so she could go to India and find out why these male Hanuman langurs were killing infants. She worked under the supervision of anthropology professor Irven DeVore and evolutionary biologist Robert L. Trivers and E. O. Wilson, earning a Ph.D. in Anthropology in 1975.

=== Family ===
Sarah Blaffer met Daniel Hrdy at Harvard. He accompanied her on early visits to Mount Abu, and they married in 1972 in Kathmandu. They have three children: Katrinka (born 1977); Sasha (born 1982, a week before Hrdy was scheduled to present a paper at Cornell University); and Niko (born 1986). Sarah Blaffer Hrdy now lives with her husband in northern California, where they are engaged in walnut farming and habitat restoration at Citrona Farms.

== Career ==
Hrdy alternated research work in India with time at Harvard until 1979. Between 1974 and 1984, she taught for brief periods at the University of Massachusetts, Boston; Harvard and Rice University, and worked as a volunteer at her daughter's daycare center until 1984 when she joined the University of California, Davis as a professor of anthropology. Hrdy retired in 1996, becoming a professor emerita of anthropology at UC Davis, where she continues to be involved with the Animal Behavior Graduate Group.

== Research ==
=== The Langurs of Abu ===
Sarah Hrdy first heard of langurs during an undergraduate primate behavior class taught by anthropologist Irven DeVore in 1968. DeVore commented on the relationship between crowding and the killing of infants in langur colonies. After graduation, Hrdy returned to Harvard for graduate studies, with the goal of better understanding the phenomenon of infanticide in primates. Working under the supervision of DeVore, Trivers and Wilson provided Hrdy with an introduction to the emerging science of sociobiology—which crystallized at Harvard in the early 1970s. Sociobiology's comparative evolutionary perspective would shape Hrdy's work for years to come.

Although Hrdy had initially gone to Mount Abu to explore the hypothesis that crowding was responsible for infanticide, soon she realized her starting hypothesis was wrong. Infants were only attacked when males entered the breeding system from outside it. This led her to what she termed the sexual selection hypothesis for explaining infanticide. Males are eliminating unweaned infants sired by rival males and in doing so inducing the mother to resume cycling and ovulate again sooner than had she continued to lactate. Turnover in her langur troupes occurred roughly on average every 27 months leaving the usurping male only a brief window of opportunity to breed and pass on his genes. If the females are nursing infants, it is likely that they will not ovulate for another year. Killing their dependent infants rendered females fertile again sooner than they otherwise would be.

Female choice is subverted, as females are put under pressure to ovulate and are forced to breed with the infanticidal males. This is where the idea of sexual counter-strategies comes into play. Hrdy hypothesized that by mating with a male who might take over her troupe ahead of time, they protect their infants subsequently born since males were unlikely to kill an infant if there was a chance that it might be their own, a behavior that would be rapidly selected against.

While infanticide by males has since been reported across the primate order in prosimians, New and Old World monkeys, and ape, Hrdy found no evidence to suggest a 'genetic imperative' for infanticide in humans.

In 1975, Hrdy was awarded her PhD for her research on langurs. In 1977 it was published in her second book, The Langurs of Abu: Female and Male Strategies of Reproduction. However her proposal that infanticide might be an evolved reproductive strategy in primates proved highly controversial, running counter to the then current conviction that primates act for the good of the group rather than to promote the reproductive interests of any individual. Nevertheless, her findings have since been replicated in many animals and her explanations are widely accepted. Even Trivers, who once dismissed her ideas about female sexual solicitations of multiple males, admits that her theory regarding female counter strategies to infanticide have "worn well."

=== The Woman That Never Evolved ===
Hrdy's third book came out in 1981: The Woman That Never Evolved. She begins chapter one with a sentence indicating that the results of her work suggest female agency should be given a lot more credit than previously assumed. "Biology, it is sometimes thought, has worked against women." Here, Hrdy expands upon female reproductive strategies. The book was selected as one of The New York Times' Notable Books of 1981.

In 1984, Hrdy co-edited Infanticide: Comparative and Evolutionary Perspectives. It was selected as a 1984–1985 "Outstanding Academic Book" by Choice, the journal of the Association of College and Research Libraries.

=== Mother Nature ===
In 1999, Hrdy published Mother Nature: A history of mothers, infants, and natural selection. She examines "human mothers and infants in a broader comparative and evolutionary framework," informing and forming views of mother-infant interdependence from a sociobiological viewpoint.

In it she described the trade-offs between subsistence and reproduction that mothers have to juggle, sometimes leading to difficult maternal investment "decisions". Rather than assuming automatic maternal responses, Hrdy views "maternal instinct" as a process unfolding in line with local conditions and cues from the infant. She stresses that an ape producing such costly offspring as humans could not have evolved unless mothers had had help from others, and had been what sociobiologists term cooperative breeders.

Humans evolved to rely on assistance from group members other than the mother, using the term "allomother" she first used in her 1975 PhD thesis describing infant-sharing in langurs (from the Greek "allo" for "other than") to refer to any female or male other than the mother who helps to care for an infant. In the human case allomothers are often a father, grandparents, or older siblings, as well as genetically unrelated helpers, including nannies, and child care groups, who help care for and provision infants, freeing the mother to meet her own needs and in the case of early humans, breed again sooner.

=== Mothers and Others: The evolutionary origins of mutual understanding ===
In Mother Nature Hrdy argued that apes with the life history attributes of Homo sapiens could not have evolved unless alloparents in addition to parents had helped to care for and provision offspring, "the Cooperative Breeding Hypothesis".

In 2009 in Mothers and Others, Hrdy explored cognitive and emotional implications for infants growing up in what was (for an ape) a novel developmental context. Instead of relying on the single-minded dedication of their mothers, youngsters had to monitor and engage multiple caretakers as well. Other apes possess cognitive wiring for rudimentary Theory of Mind, but with cooperative rearing, relevant potentials for mentalizing would have become more fully expressed, and thus rendered more visible to natural selection. Over generations, those youngsters better at inter-subjective engagement would have been best cared for and fed, leading to directional Darwinian selection favoring peculiarly human capacities for intersubjective engagement.

In 2014, Mothers and Others, together with earlier work, earned Hrdy the National Academy's Award for Scientific Reviewing in honor of her "insightful and visionary synthesis of a broad range of data and concepts from across the social and biological sciences to illuminate the importance of biosocial processes among mothers, infants, and other social actors in forming the evolutionary crucible of human societies."

Because of her research on parenting, Hrdy is a strong advocate for making affordable child care a priority.

=== Father Time: A Natural History of Men and Babies ===
This book completes Hrdy's trilogy on childcare in human societies. In Mother Nature she covered maternal care; in Mothers and Others she moved on to alloparents; in Father Time she finishes the story. Hrdy sweeps across millennia, and across species, from the earliest vertebrates to primates, making a case for the importance of male parents. Long-lived, late-developing, fast-reproducing Homo sapiens, whose brains are enormously metabolically costly, could never have evolved without help--from mothers, from allomothers, and from the fathers who provide for their children, protect them, teach them and love them.

== Feminism ==
Hrdy is considered a key figure involved in the development of Darwinian feminism or feminist sociobiology. According to her, the peripheral position of women in late 20th century ethology and sociobiology made them predisposed to observe phenomena overlooked by then-dominant male biologists.

== Philanthropy ==
Together with Daniel Hrdy, Sarah Hrdy has endowed fellowships at the Radcliffe Institute as well as The Sarah and Daniel Hrdy Visiting Fellowship in Conservation Biology in the Department of Organismic and Evolutionary Biology at Harvard University, followed in 2021 by endowment of the Daniel and Sarah Hrdy Fund for University of California Cooperative Extension research in sustainable agriculture and habitat restoration.

== Bibliography ==
=== Books ===
- 1972: The Black-man of Zinacantan: A Central American Legend. The Texas Pan American Series. Austin: University of Texas Press. ISBN 0-292-70701-0.
- 1977: The Langurs of Abu: Female and Male Strategies of Reproduction. Cambridge: Harvard University Press. ISBN 0-674-51058-5.
- 1981: The Woman that Never Evolved. Cambridge: Harvard University Press. (Chosen by the New York Times Book Review as one of Notable Books of the Year in Science and Social Science.) 1982, Japanese edition, Tokyo: Shisaku-sha Publishing; 1984, 5th printing of paperback edition, Cambridge; 1984, 1st French edition, Des guenons et des femmes. Paris: Editions Tierce, in press, 2nd French edition, Paris: Payot et Rivage; 1985, Italian edition, La Donna Che Non si E'evoluta, Franco Angeli Editore. ISBN 0-674-95539-0.
- 1984: Hausfater, G. and S. Hrdy, eds. Infanticide: Comparative and Evolutionary Perspectives. New York: Aldine Publishing Co. (Selected as one of the 1984-85 "Outstanding Academic Books" by Choice, the Journal of the Association of College and Research Libraries.) ISBN 0-202-36221-3.
- 1999: Mother Nature: A History of Mothers, Infants and Natural Selection. New York: Pantheon. A BOMC Alternative Selection; selected by Publishers Weekly and by the Library Journal as one of Best Books of 1999 and a finalist for PEN USA West 2000 Literary Award for Research Nonfiction. Won the Howells Prize for Outstanding Contribution to Biological Anthropology. (Published in UK as Mother Nature: Natural selection and the female of the species. London: Chatto and Windus); also translated into Chinese, Dutch, French, German, Italian, Portuguese, Spanish, Japanese, Korean and Polish. ISBN 0-679-44265-0.
- 2005: The 92nd Dahlem Workshop Report, "Attachment and Bonding: A New Synthesis." Edited by C. S. Carter, L. Ahnert, K. E. Grossmann, S. B. Hrdy, M. E. Lamb, S. W. Porges, and N. Sachser. ©MIT Press. ISBN 0-262-03348-8.
- 2009: Mothers and Others: The Evolutionary Origins of Mutual Understanding. Cambridge: Harvard University Press. ISBN 0-674-03299-3.
- 2024: Father Time: A Natural History of Men and Babies. Princeton University Press. ISBN 0-691-23877-4.

== Awards ==
- 1981, NYT Notable Books of 1981, The Woman That Never Evolved
- 1985, Elected, California Academy of Sciences
- 1987–88, Guggenheim Fellow
- 1988, Radcliffe Graduate Society Medal
- 1990, Elected, National Academy of Sciences
- 1992, Elected, American Academy of Arts and Sciences
- 1999, Publishers Weekly, "Best Books of 1999", Mother Nature
- 1999, Library Journal, "Best Books of 1999", Mother Nature
- 2001, Howells Prize for Outstanding Contributions to Biological Anthropology, Mother Nature
- 2003, University of California Panunzio award
- 2007, Centennial Medal, Harvard GSAS
- 2011, Elected American Philosophical Society
- 2012, Staley Prize from School of Advanced Research for Mothers and Others
- 2012, Howells Prize for Mothers and Others
- 2013, HBES Lifetime Career Award for Distinguished Scientific Contribution, from Human Behavior and Evolution Society
- 2014, NAS Award for Scientific Reviewing for "For her insightful and visionary synthesis of a broad range of data and concepts from across the social and biological sciences to illuminate the importance of biosocial processes among mothers, infants, and other social actors in forming the evolutionary crucible of human societies."
- 2022, Elected fellow of American Association for the Advancement of Science
- 2023, Bowlby-Ainsworth Award from the Center for Mental Health Promotion and the New York Attachment Consortium
- 2025, Father Time Winner of the 2025 PROSE Award in Biological Anthropology and Archaeology from the Association of American Publishers
- 2025, Father Time Long-listed for 2025 PEN/E.O. Wilson Literary Science Writing Award
