= Alloparenting =

Parenting not done by the birth parents

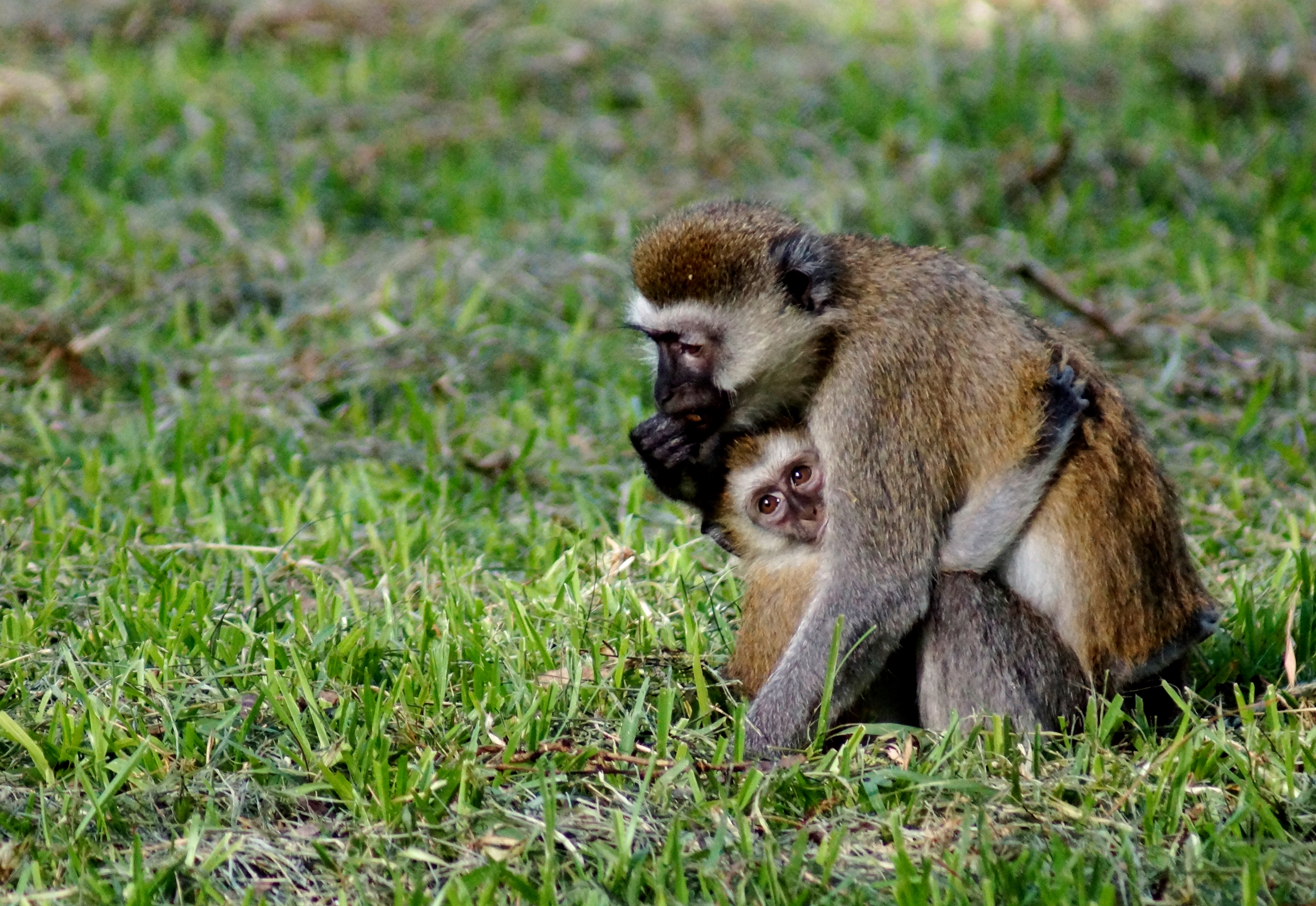
Vervet monkey with young in Tanzania

Alloparenting (or alloparental care) is a term for any form of parental care provided by an individual towards young that are not its own direct offspring. These are often called "non-descendant" young, even though grandchildren can be among them. Among humans, alloparenting is often performed by a child's grandparents and older siblings. Individuals providing this care are called by the neutral term "alloparent" (or "helper").

Alloparental care encapsulates a diverse range of parenting systems across a range of animal groups and social structures. The alloparent–young relationship can be mutualistic or parasitic, and between or within species. Cooperative breeding, joint brood care, reciprocal allonursing, brood parasitism and cuckoldry represent situations in which alloparenting plays a role.

This form of parenting is often seen among humans. However, it is not as popular among other species. Alloparenting is rare among classes of animals such as birds and mammals, with only about 3% of mammals exhibiting this parenting style, but this does not mean it does not occur. In species that alloparent, it has been seen that offspring grow at faster rates and are often weaned earlier.

== Behavior ==
The behavior revolving around alloparental care is more or less the same among species. The term "babysitting" is often used as a way to describe how this parental style works. In humans, alloparenting is common and mainly revolves around this term. Other parents and people watch others' young and help care for them while the biological parents are busy. This is seen in sperm whales as well. To allow the mother to dive and gather food and resources, the whales in their social group separate their dives allowing for the baby to be monitored and overseen by a whale during all times. Superb starlings also perform this behavior. Their group living situation contributes to many potential parent figures in the young's life. The mother and father may provide the heat and guarding of the nest however it is a network of other superb starlings that also watch over and take care of the offspring as well. These behaviors allow for the parents to have more freedom while knowing that the young are cared for. Alloparental care itself involves certain behaviors from the individuals partaking in this care. In humans and chimpanzees, this may involve carrying, walking with, cleaning, and physical contact with the young. In other animals such as whales, birds, and Indian free-range dogs, these behaviors may be feeding/regurgitating food, giving warmth, and guarding. In sea lions, behaviors such as allonursing may be seen. Behavior is the center of alloparenting and without parental care, many species' young would not survive.

== Allonursing ==
Allonursing falls under alloparenting. Allonursing is when a female provides nourishment for offspring that is not her own. Alloparenting is rare, but allonursing is even rarer. One reason why, is that for a female to breastfeed, she must have given birth recently. In milk, different antibodies and immune boosting nutrients can be found. Allonursing helps the offspring receive more immune compounds than those of just its mother. Allonursing not only benefits the offspring but it also benefits the nurser as well by allowing her to gain maternal experience, and therefore when her offspring is around she will be able to strengthen its survival. In a study done with cooperative breeders and non-cooperative breeding species, the researchers found that there were fewer cooperative breeding species that allonursed however it was not a significant amount. In noncooperative breeding species, 66% of litter-bearing group living species allonursed compared to 31% of monotocous species. In both cases, milk composition was not a factor.

In a case study on sea lions, allonursing can be seen as well. In this study, the researchers recorded an allonursing event when an individual was observed nursing more than one pup at a time and suckling was being performed by a pup or yearling that was confirmed as not her own by tags, brands, or natural marking. If there was any doubt in this, the event was not concluded. During this study, allonursing was seen twice during the pupping season and more commonly occurred later on. Primiparous females were seen more often allonursing a pup than multiparous females. Unless the multiparous female was sleeping, oftentimes she would not allow nonfilial pups to suckle and immediately terminate any allosuckling as soon as she noticed the nonfilial pup. This was different from the primiparous females who allowed for allonursing to continue.

Through these studies, it can be seen that allonursing is not common and for many, it is all based on the specific species and way of life. Though allonursing is beneficial to the offspring in receiving a wider variety of immune compounds, many species do not partake in this event.

== Theory ==
In biology, ethology and sociology, alloparental care is defined as any form of parental care, which is directed towards non-descendant young. It was first used by Edward O. Wilson in 1975, in his book Sociobiology in an attempt to define a neutral term which could encapsulate the gender and relation specific terms of 'aunite' and 'auncle' which had previously been coined in the literature to describe this sort of behaviour. In addition, Wilson used the term alloparent (or 'helper') to refer to the individuals providing the care, and proposed allomaternal and allopaternal as phrases that could be used to distinguish the sex of the helper. "Alloparent" roughly means "other-parent"; from the Greek root "allo-", meaning other.

Alloparenting encapsulates a diverse range of parenting systems and behaviours. Simply, it can be understood as a system of parenting where individuals other than a direct genetic parent act in a parental role, either for a short, or extended period of time. This definition does not exclude alloparents who are blood relatives of the offspring, such as siblings and aunts, who are often observed as 'helpers at the nest'. In such cases, the alloparent and the offspring share a degree of relatedness (r (coefficient of relatedness) > 0); so kin selection is often involved in the evolution of the behaviour. Use of the term non-descendant young, as opposed to non-related young is therefore an important distinction in the definition of alloparenting. The non-descendant young in whom the alloparent invests can be conspecific (of the same species) or heterospecific (of a different species), a phenomenon often observed in fish and a select number of bird species.

There is some debate as to whether interspecific alloparenting (caring for the young of another species) constitutes 'true' alloparental care, particularly when the relationship is parasitic for the alloparent, and the care being directed is therefore 'misdirected' or constitutes a maladaptive behaviour. Though such parasitic relationships, such as what occurs with cuckoo chicks, were not specifically addressed by Edward O. Wilson in his original discussion, adoption and slavery across species in ants was discussed; a relationship which could be described as parasitic for the heterospecific young. This article will consider interspecific and parasitic alloparental behaviours to satisfy the definition of alloparental care.

== Alloparental investment ==
In 1972, Robert Trivers defined parental investment as: "any investment by the parent in an individual offspring that increases the offspring's chance of surviving (and hence reproductive success) at the cost of the parents ability to invest in other offspring".

This concept of parental investment applies to the alloparent in the same way that it does to a genetic parent; however, any investment into the production of gametes, which Trivers included in his definition, is not relevant, and is therefore usually restricted to behavioral considerations for the alloparent. Possible forms of investment provided by an alloparent can be defined by three of the four classifications of energy expenditure proposed by Crawford and Balon (1996):

- Type II – Preparing for the offspring prior to zygotic development in terms of nest/den building and territory defense.
- Type III – Direct provisioning of food for the young.
- Type IV – Tending to, caring for, feeding, defending and teaching the young.

Given that the alloparent is never the genetic parent, and was therefore not involved in the reproductive behavior/copulation that produced the young, the Type I classification, 'energy investment in gametes', is not relevant when we consider alloparental investment.

== Classification ==
The forms of alloparental care which occur in nature are numerous and varied and resist classification. Relationships between the alloparent and the young, and the alloparent and the genetic parent, range from cooperative and mutualistic to exploitative and parasitic. The below outline provides one classification for the many forms of alloparenting which have been observed:

=== 'True' (mutualistic) ===
This form of alloparenting is characterized by interactions/relationships which provide and overall fitness benefit to the alloparent, the young, and the genetic parent. This sort of parental care is often closely tied to social organisation and is thus very common in advanced animal societies such as primates. It can take on the forms of:

- Cooperative breeding – This system of breeding is characterised by individuals (alloparents) who delay or forego their personal reproduction in order to assist in the reproduction of other individuals within the group, often a dominant breeding pair. The alloparent 'helpers' are most commonly the siblings of the new offspring, or siblings to the breeding pair. This system is common amongst birds, primates and mammals such as the blackbacked jackal, and African wild dogs who share in pup feeding and display 'babysitting' behaviour. Cooperative breeding is often provided as strong evidence in support of kin selection. Cooperative breeding, particularly in birds, is favored in marginal environments where food is limited or there are high predation rates and it is therefore tough for a breeding pair to successfully raise young on their own. Newly independent young may also find alloparenting the most successful reproduction option available to them in environments where the resources are scarce or there is habitat saturation. An extreme case of cooperative breeding is what occurs in eusocial insects such as some bee and ant species where a caste system has evolved and workers forgo their personal reproduction to aid in the reproductive success of the colony, gaining indirect fitness benefits through assisting related young.
- Joint brood care ('babysitting') – Communal care of broods is similar to cooperative breeding, but more commonly involves a number of reproductive pairs or mothers. Sometimes referred to as 'babysitting' or reciprocal cooperation, this system of parenting allows the genetic parents greater foraging freedom, and appears to be supported by the mutual benefits participating individuals acquire through reciprocal altruism. Reciprocal altruism involves individuals performing acts to increase the fitness of another individual, in the hope that the act will be reciprocated. It is not dependent on relatedness, and therefore, babysitting behaviour is often observed amongst non-kin. This form of alloparental care has been observed in reindeer and elk who display reciprocal allonursing and form 'nursery' herds, and vampire bats who display reciprocity in food sharing. Babysitting females are frequently observed in primate species, such as the ring-tailed lemur, vervet monkeys, rhesus macaques and langurs. The formation of nursery groups has also been reported in the Atlantic bottle-nose dolphin and sperm whales. There are some cases in which brood amalgamation between two species has been observed. In Lake Malawi, cichlid parents are seen to 'farm out' their brood into the brood a potential predator, the Bagrus meridionalis catfish, and remain to help defend against predators. Intriguingly, the catfish's care of heterospecific young is mutualistic for all parties.

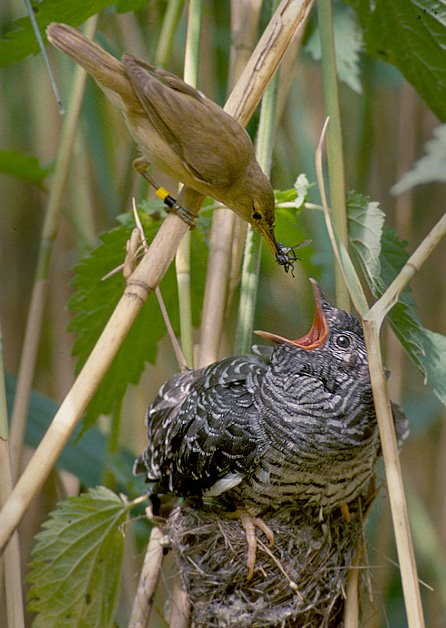
Brood parasitism: Reed warbler feeds a common cuckoo chick.

=== 'Misdirected' (parasitic) ===
Relationships between 'parents' and young that are in some way parasitic, perhaps resulting from reproductive errors or maladaptive behaviour, are an interesting and somewhat hazy form of alloparenting. In some cases, alloparents may find themselves investing in heterospecific young, and gaining none, or very little overall fitness benefit. Though ultimately maladaptive, this sort of behaviour may be supported by an inability of parents to recognize their own young (for example stolen fertilisations in fish), or supernormal stimuli 'enslaving' the alloparent into providing the care, as is seen in the case of brood parasitism of the cuckoo bird. The genetic parents and the young are not exempt to parasitism and exploitation either. In some species of fish, males exhibit zygote stealing, or alloparents may kidnap free-swimming young to help reduce selective pressures on their own brood. In some cases, alloparents may exploit young in order to receive immediate benefits. In some primate species, low ranking individuals, particularly males, will temporarily care for young in order to increase social status, gain reproductive benefits or use them for 'agonistic buffering', often with little concern for the welfare of the young. Two well-documented types of parasitic or misdirected alloparenting are:

- Brood parasitism: this is where the genetic parent will leave their young in either the care of a conspecific or heterospecific alloparent who commonly has a brood of their own.
- Cuckoldry: this occurs in many colonially breeding bird species where extra-pair copulations may take place and the males end up caring for unrelated offspring.

== Benefits ==
=== To the alloparent ===
Benefits acquired by the alloparent are dependent on the form of alloparental care, but range from:

- Indirect fitness benefits gained via kin selection
- Parental experience: gaining mothering/parental practice through 'babysitting' can increase the likelihood that the alloparents future genetic offspring will survive.
- Increase in social rank
- Extra-pair breeding opportunities/acquisition of mates
- Protection from predation during cooperative breeding or joint brood care.
- 'Agonistic buffering': individuals may enlist the influence of young within a group as protection during aggressive interactions.
- Acquisition of home territory following cooperative breeding
- Increased survival of genetic offspring during joint brood care

=== To the young ===
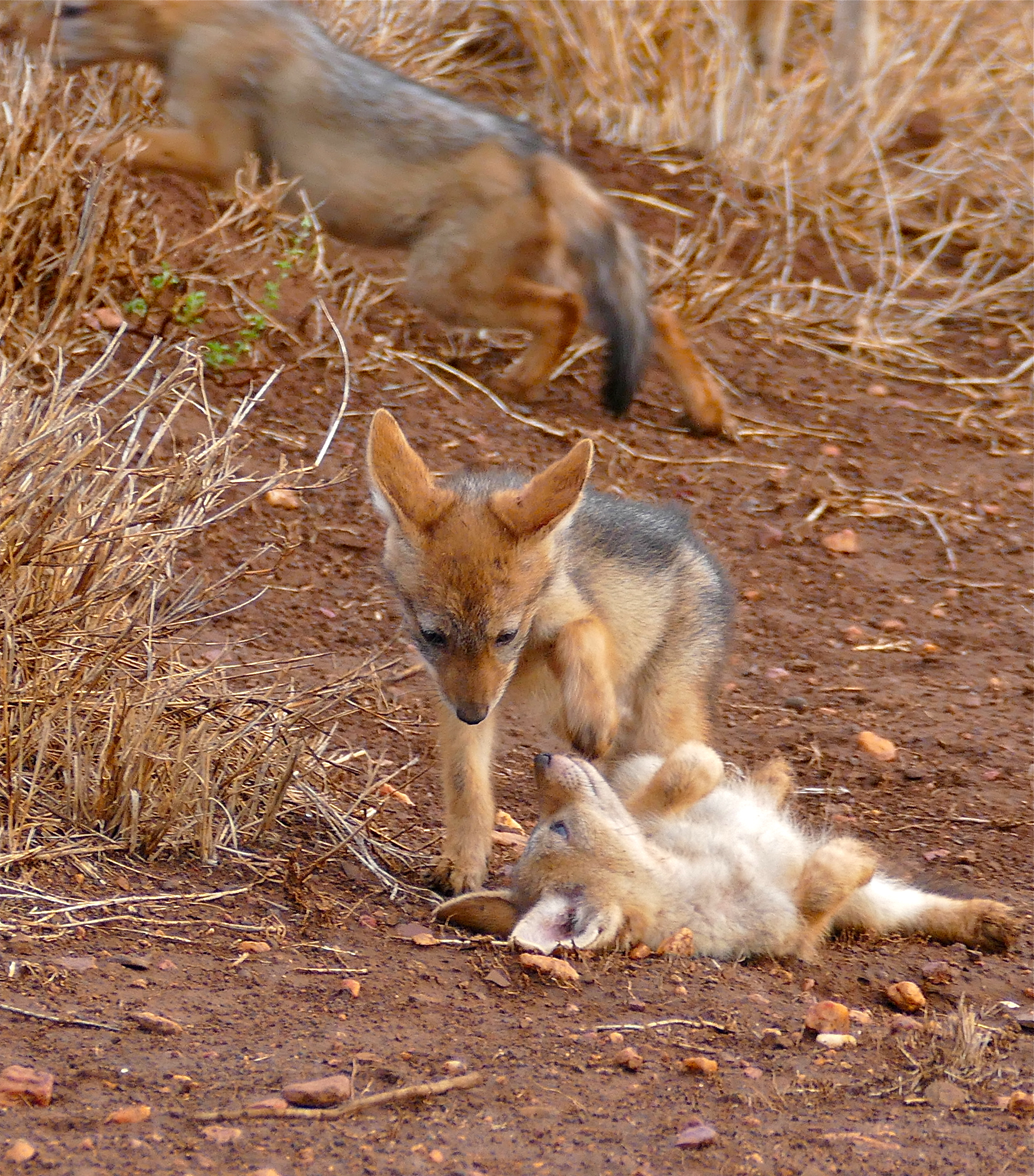
Black-backed jackal pups playing

In almost all forms of alloparenting, the young get an overall fitness benefit from the care provided. In cooperative breeding or joint brood care, the presence of 'helpers' at the nest or den usually increases the young's probability of surviving. This has been observed in a number of species including the black-backed jackal (Canis mesomelas). In a study of jackal groups in Tanzania spanning three and a half years, it was found that the presence of sibling helpers in the den had a significant positive correlation to offspring survivorship. Through helping feed the mother and her pups, guarding the litter, and contributing to their grooming and learning of how to hunt, each helper in addition to the parents, added 1.5 surviving pups to the litter. By helping raise their full siblings, with whom they share a coefficient of relatedness of 1/2, the helpers were benefiting from increasing their inclusive fitness.

=== In cooperative breeding ===
In cooperative breeding, mothers are able to conserve energy, travel further away from nesting grounds to forage for food/supplies, maintain social interactions, and better protect their offspring from predators. The offspring that experience alloparental care benefit from increased protection from predators, development of social cues, and learning group dynamics through social interactions. The alloparents benefit as they are given the opportunity to gain mothering skills before they have reached reproductive age. The relationships formed through alloparenting have also been seen to enhance the stability of the family, herd, or community over time.

== Costs ==
=== To the young ===
In some instances of alloparental care the young are exploited, which may lead to mistreatment by the alloparent. An example of this is when male primates use young for 'agonistic buffering' during confrontations with dominant males. If the alloparents are inexperienced as parents, this could pose as a danger to the young. In some cases of brood amalgamation, young are positioned in a way that subjects them to greater predation risk than the genetic young of the alloparent.

=== To the alloparent ===
Alloparenting, given that the behaviour is often initiated by the alloparent, is rarely a costly act for the alloparent. Instances where the alloparent receives no benefits, or incurs a cost, generally involve parasitic relationships, where the individual has performed a reproductive mistake, or is misdirecting their parental care.

== Evolution ==
In many discussions of alloparental care, the comment is often made that alloparenting can at first appear altruistic. This appearance stems from the fact that benefits to the alloparent are very rarely immediate, and any fitness benefits gained are indirect. Though alloparenting systems based on reciprocal altruism are well studied, purely altruistic care by an alloparent has not been observed. Two of the main evolutionary driving forces of alloparental behaviour are kin selection and reciprocal altruism. In cases where the alloparent and young share no degree of relatedness, other benefits to the alloparent will have contributed to the evolution of the behaviour, such as 'mothering-practice' or increased survivorship through association with a group. The cases where an evolution of such behaviour is hardest to explain are parasitic relationships such as the cuckoo chick in the nest of a smaller host parent. Behavioral ecologists have cited supernormal stimuli, reproductive errors, or the inability of alloparents to recognize their young as explanations that may support this behaviour.

In general, the occurrence of alloparenting is the result of both the life history traits of the species (how evolution has predisposed them to behave), and the ecological conditions in which the individual finds itself.

=== Evolution of cooperative breeding ===
Cooperative breeding constitutes a unique case of alloparenting with a specific evolution. It is a key example of where the evolution has been driven by the combination of life history traits and ecological factors, which act as the triggers. The first hypothesis put forward for the evolution of cooperative breeding was that a shortage of suitable breeding habitat encouraged young to remain at the nest or territory for a period of time before trying to raise their own young. For example, habitat saturation was shown to be responsible for cooperative breeding in the Seychelles warbler, a small passerine bird. It was also observed that remaining at the nest correlated to a higher chance of inheriting the parent's territory. Additional ecological constraints have since been proposed as factors favoring cooperative breeding:

- Reduced survival probability following dispersal
- Reduced probability of finding a mate
- Reduced chance of successful breeding once a territory has been established

As a result, cooperative breeding is often seen in populations where there is:

- High population density
- Intense competition for food, territory and resources
- Stable environment

This has in turn selected for species producing a small number of offspring who require a large amount of parental care.

== In nature ==
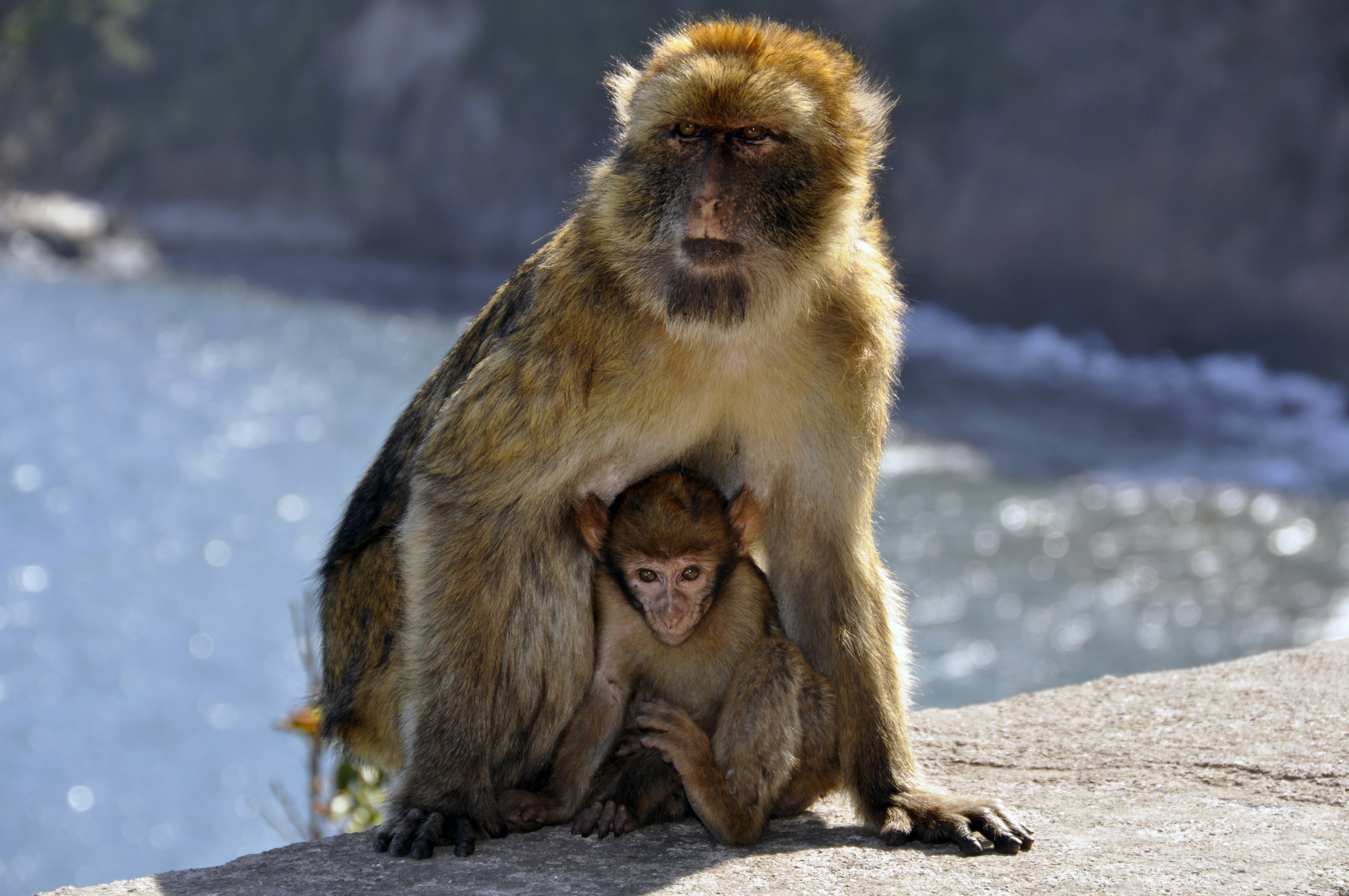
Barbary macaque with its young in Cap Carbon (Gouraya National Park).

Cooperative breeding exists in 9% of birds and in 3% of mammals.

Alloparenting behavior is known from 120 mammal and 150 bird species. "In mammals, care typically encompasses allolactation, pup-feeding, babysitting and carrying young." This is seen when male Barbary macaques carry around unrelated infants and care for them for hours at a time. Another example is when warthog sows suckle piglets from other litters after the sows have lost their own litters.

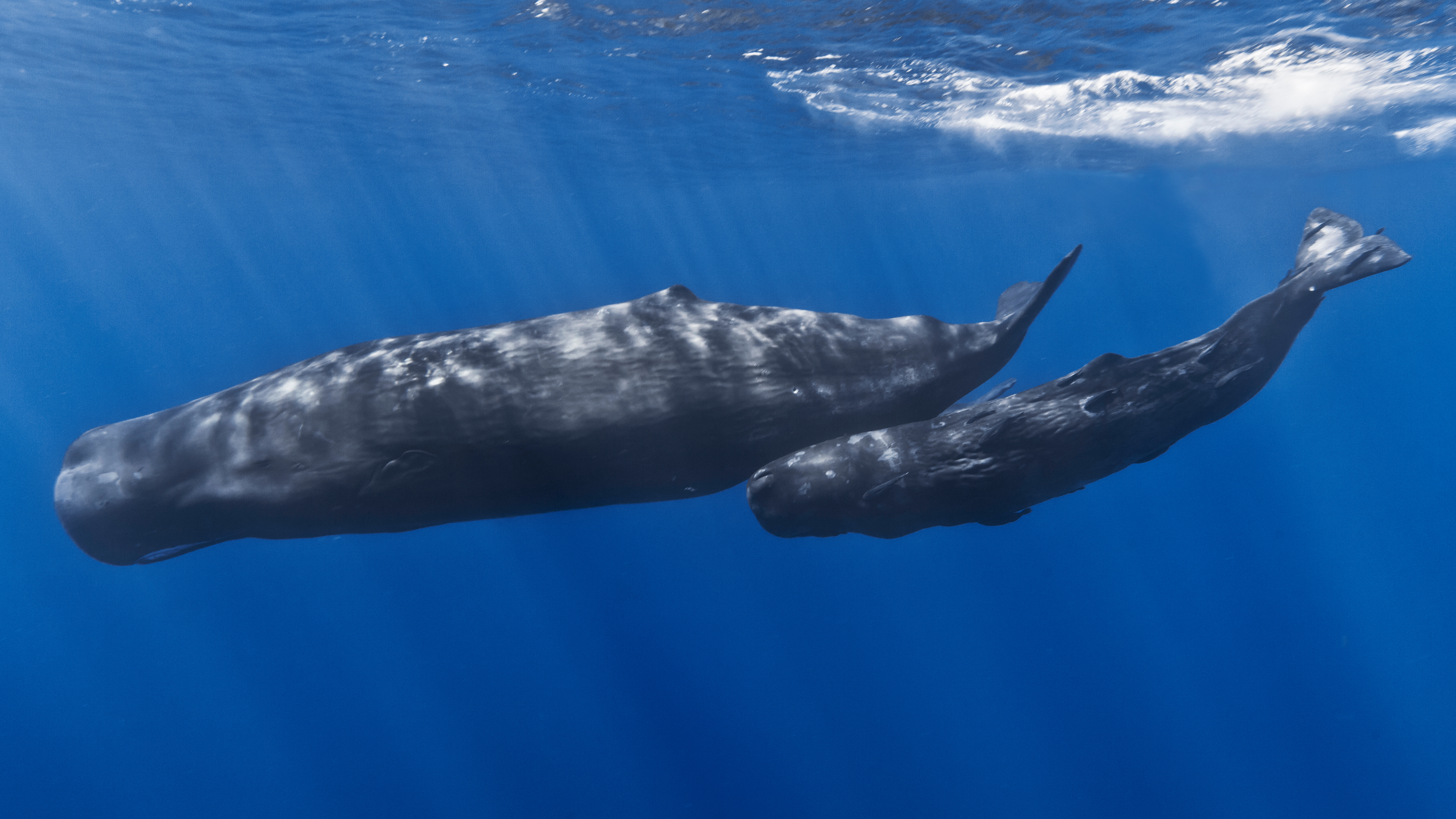
A mother sperm whale and her calf off the coast of Mauritius.

=== 'Babysitting' in sperm whales ===
Sperm whales (Physeter macrocephalus) are deep divers that exhibit alloparental care in the form of 'babysitting'. When the whales are young, they are not able to dive to and remain at the depths that their mothers frequent in order to graze and feed. Yet being left at the surface alone makes them vulnerable to predators like killer whales and sharks. Sperm whale social groups appear to modulate their diving behaviour in order to provide alloparental care to young within the group and reduce the time they spend alone at the surface, at the same time allowing the mother greater foraging freedom. They do this by changing the synchronicity of their dives to limit the time a young whale spends alone. As the 'babysitters' or alloparents dive and resurface the calves swim between them and therefore care is provided by a number of members within the social group.

To observe alloparental care in sperm whales, researchers looked at patterns of diving and surfacing in groups with calves compared to groups without calves. The calves were observed accompanied by an adult member other than the mother and this allowed the mothers to feed while the calf was protected. The overlapping dive improves the survivability of the calf and benefits the mothers involved with the dive changes. This form of alloparenting is a learned behavior that occurs under certain circumstances. The neurobiological background in sperm whales has not been deeply observed but coincides with the basis for alloparental care and adolescents learning motherly actions early and the calves gaining the most benefit.

=== Pilot whales ===
Alloparental care in pilot whales is observed in both direct and indirect forms. Babysitting is a form of direct care while shelter construction and maintenance are indirect care. The pilot whales had observed care through escorting from a non-biological member of the group. The results show that most pilot whale calves were accompanied by an escort as newborns and young calves. This study discovered that alloparental was occurring at the group level and not at the unit level. The companions providing the care were more often males than females; which is different from many of the other species listed. In other species, the males teach the social norms and behavior in group-living which explains the male companions. Reciprocal altruism is the expected return of behavior in the future and this is an explanation for this escorting behavior. By escorting the young of another parent, the alloparent can expect the same to happen with their young. Pilot whales demonstrate alloparental care in the form of escorting and this has limited cost to the alloparent through reciprocal altruism.

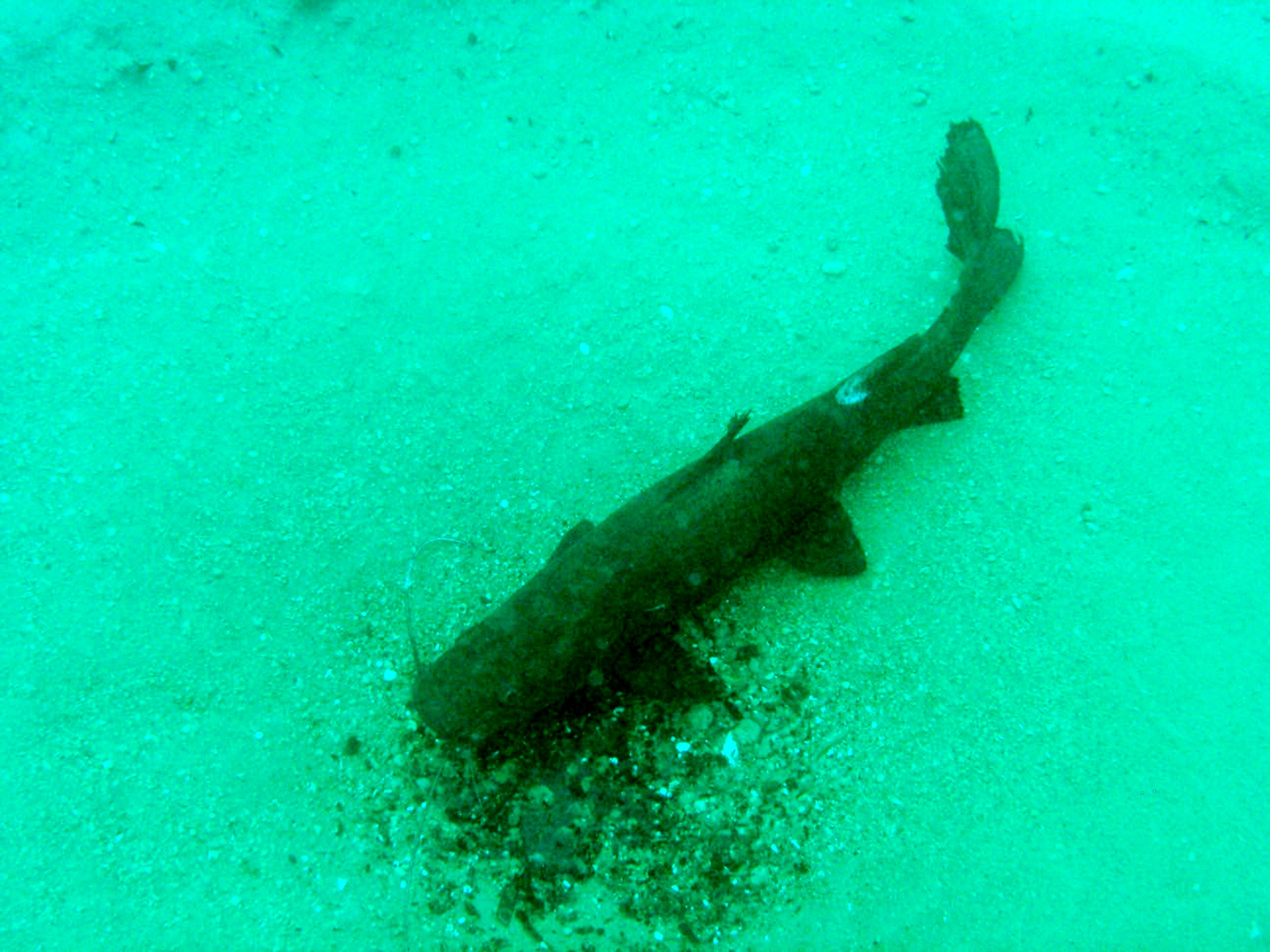
Bagrus meridionalis catfish in Lake Malawi

=== Interspecific brood amalgamation ===
In Lake Malawi, it has been observed that a select few species of cichlids will 'farm out' their young into catfish (Bagrus meridionalis) broods, a larger predatory fish. In many cases the cichlid parent will remain close by to participate in mutualistic defense of the young. In a study by Mckaye et al. (1985), 50% of observed catfish broods contained cichlid young; with the catfish offspring in these broods having six times greater survivorship. This increased survivorship of the alloparent's young has been linked to the dilution effect, and the way that the geometry of the interspecific school is manipulated such that the cichlid young are forced to the periphery, where they are more vulnerable to predation. It is through this manipulation that the catfish young gain greater protection from predators. Although placed in a more vulnerable position, the cichlid young still benefit from the interaction; both their genetic and 'allo' parents defend against predators (mutualistic defense), and being a mouth breeding species, this 'farming out' (which frees them from the mouth) may allow the cichlid young to forage more and grow faster. It has also been observed that the bagrid catfish alloparent will allow the cichlid young to feed off the skin on its dorsal surface. This case of interspecific brood care, which in some cases results in full adoption, is unique in that it is uncommon to see care of heterospecifics where the relationship is mutualistic for all parties.

=== Chimpanzees ===
Alloparental care was observed and studied in Chimpanzees. Alloparenting was a huge part of a successful twin chimpanzee's upbringing. The mother of the twins observed was Sango and they observed the parental care of these babies starting at 2 years old. In chimpanzees, there are four kinds of parenting behavior: walking together, infant carriage, grooming, and physical contact. The male twin, who was named Daiya, spent most of the time raised by Sango, his mother. Along with her care, his father Robin spent an abundance of time expressing physical contact with him and very little grooming. He also was seen walking with him often. The other chimpanzee females in the enclosure did not focus on Daiya much. Koyuki and Cherry provided a lot of physical contact with the toddler and were seen walking with him scarcely. Chelsea, another female who helped nurture him, walked with him and provided physical contact along with minimal grooming. Judy, the last female in the enclosure barely helped nurture him, she only showed physical contact a few times. The care for the female twin, Sakura, differed greatly between the fully grown adult chimpanzees. Rather than Sango providing the most care for her own young, Cherry was seen with her the most. Although Sango did provide all four parenting behaviors, she provided little grooming and walking compared to what she provided for Daiya. Like Sango, Robin provided much less care for the female twin compared to the male twin. In Sakura's case, a lot more alloparenting was observed. Cherry provided all four parenting behaviors for Sakura and so did Koyuki. Chelsea provided three out of the four parenting types and instead of grooming as she did with Daiya, she was seen carrying Sakura instead. Judy was not present as much in Sakura's upbringing just as seen with Daiya, however, she was spotted walking with her on occasion.

=== Indian free-range dogs ===
Alloparenting is observed in Indian free-range dogs as they roam the streets of India. In this study, the researchers spent their time following one dog known as ML during the first season and her daughter PW, during the second. They found that ML spent roughly 18.05% of her time with her pups. Of this 18.05%, 5.55% of that was spent actively parenting. Over time as the pups grew up and got more independent ML spent less time with them. For PW, she spent 65% of her time with her pups which 84.6% of that was spent actively parenting. For PW, her mother ML helped parent two of her pups. This occurred in the second year when ML did not give birth to any litter herself. ML showed all the behaviors of actual parenting. She helped groom, provide food, play, and protect the pups however she did not allow them to suckle. ML spent a significantly higher amount of time and effort guarding than she did with any other active parental care behaviors when alloparenting. When ML was alloparenting her grandchildren, the amount of time spent with them did not decrease as it did for her pups. Instead, she spent the same amount of time with them. She did not show any bias towards them and cared for each pup equally. Although there was no decrease in her time spent, her time alloparenting overall was less than what both her and PW spent with their kin.

=== Alloparenting expressed by cats ===
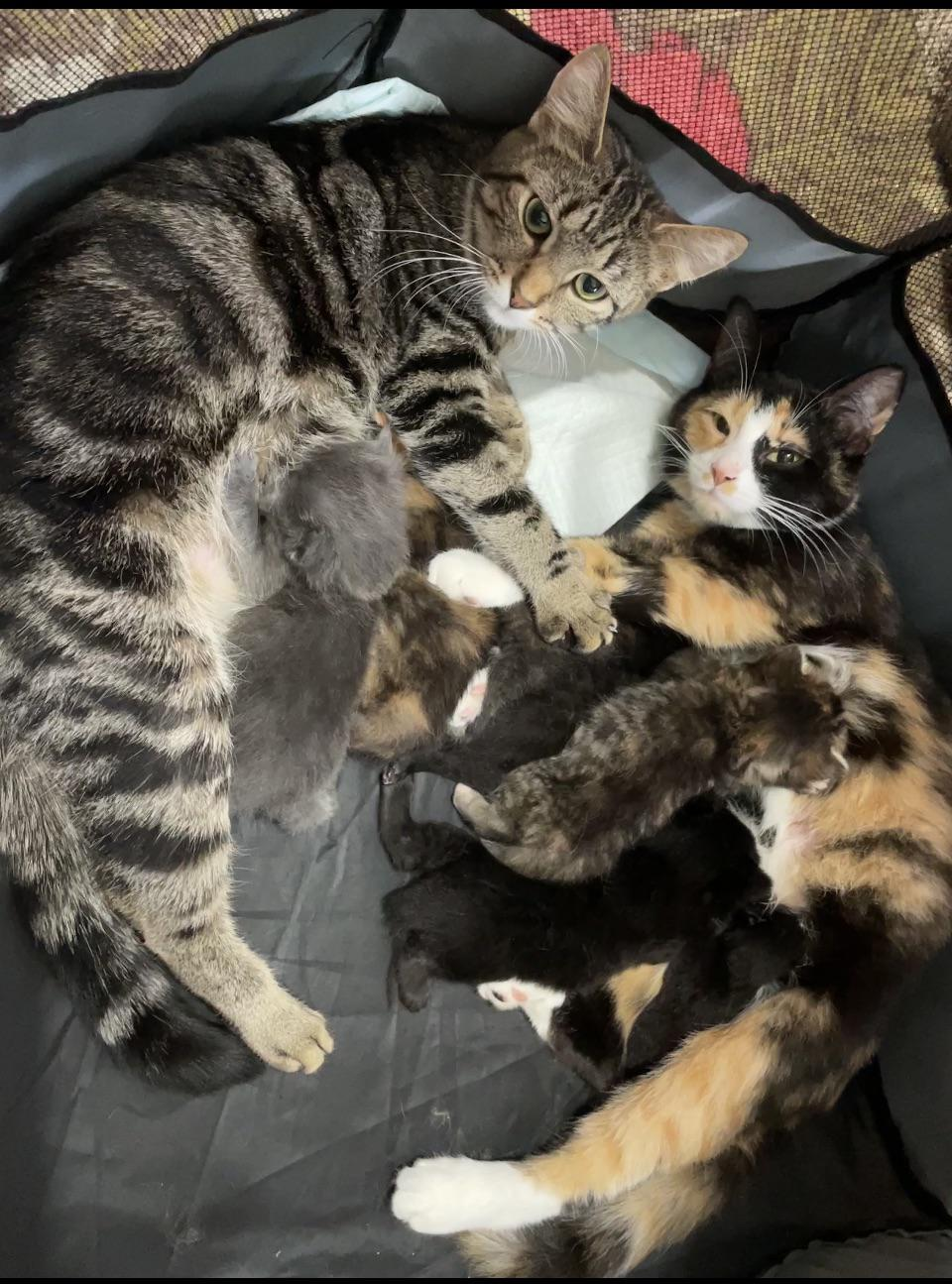
Two female housecats cooperatively nursing a litter of kittens in a nest. The one on the left is the birth mother, the one on the right does not have a litter of her own.

Alloparenting is one form of complex social behaviors that has been observed in cats, both free-ranging and domestic. Given the lack of archaeological evidence for cats kept as pets until some 4,000 years before present, intraspecific social behavior including alloparenting was most likely fully evolved before interspecific sociality emerged, but the comparative abundance of resources in and around human settlements increased frequency of the behavior. Alloparenting in particular seems to be related to feline allogrooming and allorubbing. In cats, these behaviors are conducted for a variety of purposes; such as communicating intent, removal of parasites and dirt/grime, show affection, and so on, which can result in greater familiarity between individuals. In colonial situations and shared habitats, such familiarity can extend to offspring of individuals.

As cats are altricial species, caregiving behaviors are essential for the survival of kittens. While familiar adult males and females both will tolerate kittens, communal denning and alloparental behavior are almost exclusively observed in females. In one study examining the relationships of in Japan, interactions between 200 adult cats across 72 breeding sites we observed. Cooperative nursing was observed; females were noted to groom and suckle kittens that were not their own offspring in 19 instances, 14 of which were between direct family members of 5 of unknown relation. In research published in 1987 on semi-feral farm cats in England, researchers observed that all 12 breeding females that could have nursed each other's offspring did so, and in the majority of cases shared their kittens' nests. As housecats have more opportunities to interact with one another and typically face less competition over resources or range, they display even greater social tolerance towards one another than feral or semi-feral cats, which may result in increased frequency of alloparenting behaviors, including participation not only from queens but also spayed females and castrated males, as well as others including the male sire. In any event, alloparenting amongst cats confers numerous benefits; ranging from protection against predators and potentially infanticidal males, increased health for mothers and offspring, (future) reduction in conflict over resources and territory, information exchange, and so on.

== In humans ==
Mwana wa munyako ngwako
The child of your neighbor is your own — Bantu proverb

Alloparenting in humans is a common form of parental care in a variety of cultures and can include care giving from siblings, grandparents, other relatives and unrelated family members such as teachers for providing learning and support. One particular example is a situation in which grandparents adopt a parental role. This is sometimes named a "skipped generation household". In 1997, 8% of children in the United States lived with their grandparents, with the grandparents being the caregivers in one third of those cases. According to Deihl, the Efé people of Ituri Forest in the Democratic Republic of Congo practice alloparenting, with care for infants coming from siblings, grandparents, and older members of the community. Deihl states that where siblings are alloparents this provides adolescents experience of being a parent.

== Human psychology in alloparenting ==
The traditional model of child psychology in relation to parents is called, "Classical Attachment" in which the child has a strong attachment to one figure (the mother). In alloparenting communities, attachment theory suggest that the same sort of bond is shared between the child and multiple community members. This has potential advantages for the child and the parents. The child has a diversified network of caregivers which can provide intimate emotional support. The parent's cost of child rearing goes down as well as the emotional cost and cost of tangible resources. According to The US National Library of Medicine, alloparenting has proven to activate portions of the brain that are correlated with decreasing stress levels.

== Cause and effects of alloparenting ==
=== Cause ===
Alloparental care has many benefits for the young as well as the biological parents of the young. It occurs when there is a high energetic command of the biological parents and the group living of these animals. Alloparenting helps to reduce the stresses on these animals and reduce the overall energetic demands of having offspring. The evolution of alloparenting came to rise by the rise of language which leads to cooperation, intelligence, and complex social interactions. There is an observed correlation between brain size and alloparental care by non-mothers. Oxytocin is an important hormone involved in maternal behavior. A study on voles found that the expression of oxytocin receptors proportionally affects the alloparental behavior in adult female voles. Prolactin was researched because, in biparental marmoset, the cortisol levels were higher in males than no parent males. However, there are many hypotheses about the role prolactin, cortisol, and another hypothalamic pituitary axis has on male alloparental behavior, however, there is still more research on the exact roles. There are many hormones involved in parental care and these are leads to the causes of alloparental care.

=== Effect ===
Providing alloparental care has many effects on both the receiver of the care and the recipient. A historian named Stephanie Coontz said human children "do best in societies where childrearing is considered too important to be left entirely to parents." This implies that in terms of humans alloparenting has a positive effect on the child. Receiving care from a variety of caregivers gives children the opportunity to learn from many and receive love in different ways. Introducing a child to this environment allows them to adapt and learn to love and trust widely which will be beneficial in their future adolescent and adult years when they have to leave the comfort of home.

Providing alloparental care comes at a cost to the provider of the care and there are acute and long-term effects that the provider experiences. Prairie voles exposed to pups for 3 hours results in an increase of c-Fos expression in the brain region activated by maternal behavior and c-Fos was in oxytocin neural activation. Male voles put under stressful experiences increased huddling, licking, and grooming of unrelated pups. This shows that for males alloparental care could come as a form of stress relief. There is also an observed increase in cardiovascular activity, with a constant increase of heart rate when alloparents are around pups and this is related to the alloparent providing more heat to the pup. One consequence of alloparental care in a study done on prairie voles is that adolescents exposed to pups showed a decrease in parental care to biological pups. Other long-term consequences include increased competitiveness, heightened anxiety, and association with reproductive suppression. In a study done on primates, it was found that alloparenting has a positive correlation with infant development. However, this could lead to malnutrition because mothers must provide more nutrients to keep up with the faster growth and development. Alloparental care is complex and has long-term and acute effects on the animal providing the behavior.
