= Claudia Sousa =

Portuguese primatologist (1975–2014)

Cláudia Sousa
- Born: Cláudia Maria Azenha Margato de Ramalho Sousa; 1975; Coimbra
- Died: 2014 (aged 38–39)
- Known for: leading primatologist

Cláudia Maria Azenha Margato de Ramalho Sousa (1975 – 2014) was a primatologist. She was the first Portuguese to work in the field with chimpanzees. Sousa discovered that chimpanzees would exchange tokens for food.

== Life ==
Sousa was born in Coimbra but she was bought up in Figueira da Foz. She earned her first degree and her Masters in Biological Anthropology at the University of Coimbra. Having decided to research primates she wrote to anyone who might help. The most positive reply was from someone who said that they would be in Paris visiting from Japan. She took a 23 hour bus trip to meet him. On 30 January 1999, she left for Japan where she did her doctorate in primatology, under the guidance of Japanese primatologist Tetsurō Matsuzawa, at the Primate Research Institute of the University of Kyoto. Sousa discovered that chimpanzees would exchange tokens for food. The tokens are used in the same way as humans use money and they may be stones that can crack nuts or leaves that can be used to catch water. The early recognition followed observation of captive chimps who were given tokens by researchers for good behaviour which they could use to gain food by placing them in a machine. Sousa noticed that they would keep the tokens for later use.

Sousa carried out field work at the Cantanhez Forests National Park in Guinea-Bissau. She also worked in Guinea-Conakry when she was not at the Nova de Lisboa or the University of Kyoto.

In 2004 she founded, together with Catarina Casanova and others, the Portuguese Primatology Association. Between 2007 and 2011 she was the association's President.

She died in 2014, aged 39, from cancer.

== Recognition ==
She won the 2014 and 2015 Santander Prize for her contribution to the Internationalization of Scientific Production. The award was made posthumously.

Kyoto University's Primate Research group established a fund to pay for a student each year to continue in Sousa's field of study.
