= Primate archaeology =

Field of research

Primate archaeology is a field of research established in 2008 that combines research interests and foci from primatology and archaeology. The main aim of primate archaeology is to study behavior of extant and extinct primates and the associated material records. The discipline attempts to move beyond archaeology's anthropocentric perspective by placing the focus on both past and present primate tool use.

Primate archaeology is characterized by the combination of archaeological and primatological methods, and researchers consider both non-human primate tools and their behaviour in tandem. Primate archaeology has the unique opportunity to observe the tool-use behaviors of extant non-human primates and the formation of the material record that emerges from that behavior. It is this ability to observe behavior and the subsequent material deposition resulting in a material record recoverable using standard archaeological field methods that gives this new field of research the possibility of reconstructing, predicting, and interpreting extant primates' tool use spatial patterns.

Interpretations of material culture should not assume that behavioural patterns are necessarily cultural, or that culture exists in only one form. Cultural explanations, and the type of cultural transmission involved, need to be distinguished from alternative and interacting influences such as ecology, genetics, individual learning and ontogeny. These factors can jointly shape tool-use behaviour, making simple cultural/non-cultural dichotomies potentially misleading. Overall, primate archaeology helps researchers understand how early hominins used material culture, what these patterns reveal about ancient hominin cognition, as well as patterns of landscape use that could allow researchers to identify behaviors that are difficult to detect archaeologically. Primate archaeology's main focus is on the study of the non-human primates that have been observed using tools in the wild: chimpanzees (Pan troglodytes), robust capuchins (Sapajus spp.) and long-tailed macaques (Macaca fascicularis aurea). Since its conception primate archaeology has also implemented the use of captive studies akin to archaeological experiments with non-human primates looking into stone tool manufacture.

== Origins ==
The establishment of primate archaeology as an official discipline took place around 2008 and 2009. However, the two-fold nature of this relatively new subject area can be traced back to some major events in the development of both archaeology and primatology.

=== Archaeology ===
The search for the earliest evidence of material culture in the archaeological record has been one of archaeology's major aims almost since its inception as a discipline. With the classification of stone tools as human-made artifacts and not fossils, towards the end of the seventeenth century, stone tools soon became key evidence for arranging the archaeological record into sequential cultural phases. The discovery of Eoliths, which were thought to be flint tools in the Oligocene deposits of Thenay in France led to the establishment of the Eolithic culture and Homopithecus bourgeoisi. The Eolithic tools were described as being directly used in their natural state or being poorly worked. Although some influential scholars tried to discredit the Eolith hypothesis, the discovery of the Piltdown Man in 1912 only helped to reinforce its credibility because the fossil remains were found in association with Eolithic tools. Both the Eolithic culture and Piltdown man remained controversial until they were finally discredited around the 1950s.

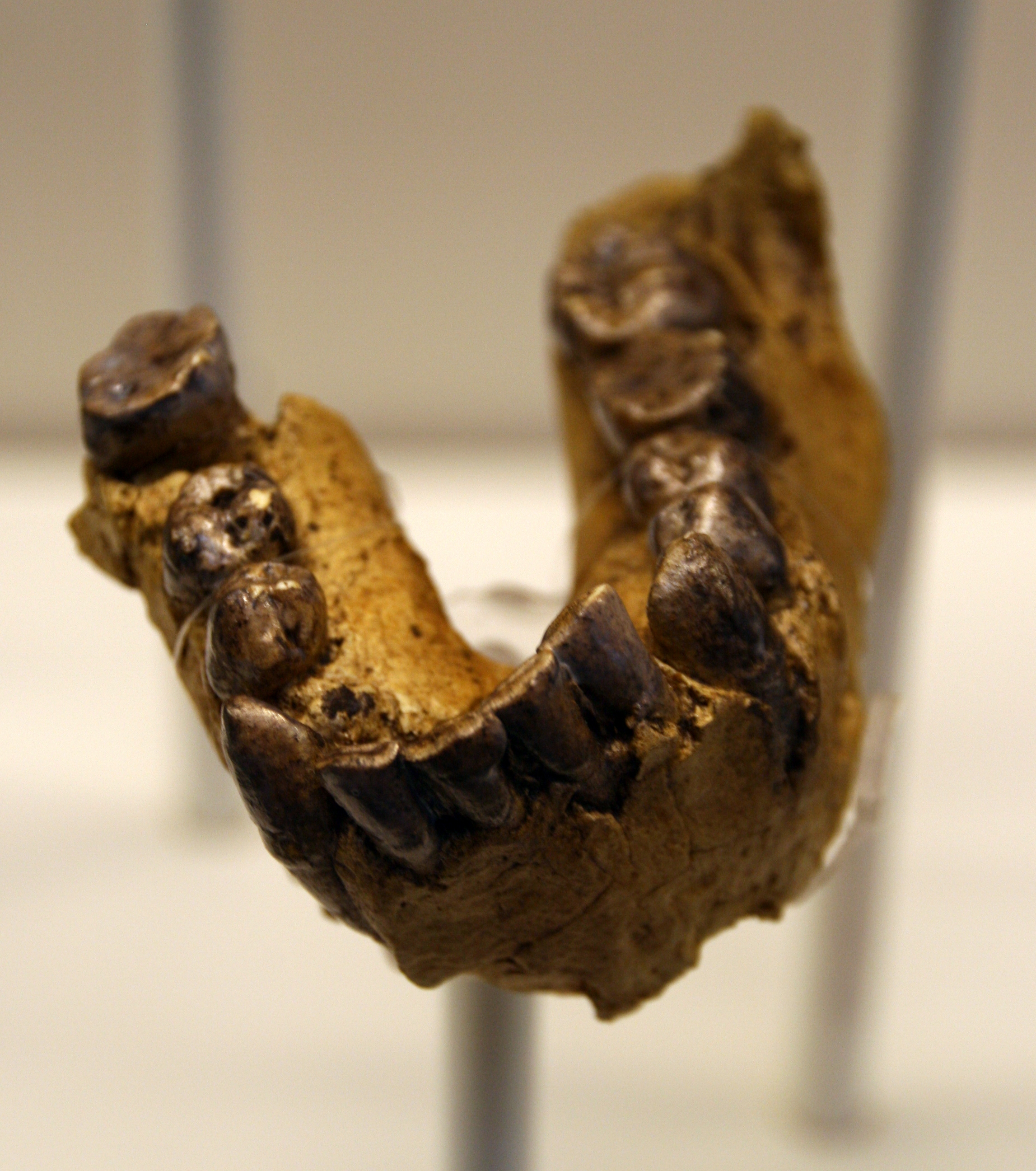
OH 7, Homo habilis

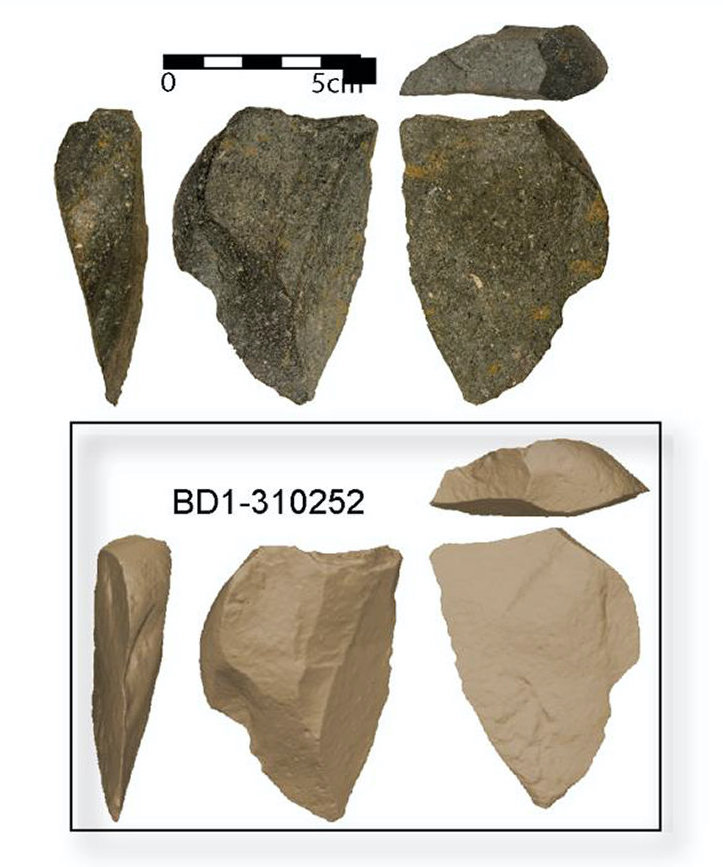
Example of Oldowan stone tools

Disregarding the Eolithic controversy, the earliest stone tools (also found in the European continent) were the Chellean being followed by the Acheulean. Thus, before the twentieth century, most archaeologists believed that Europe was where hominins began to use and manufacture stone tools. However, this narrative began to change when in 1931 Louis Leakey discovered in Olduvai Gorge stone tools that seemed to be older than those found in Europe. Soon after, Leakey formally named this discovery the Oldowan industry. Decades later, Oldupai was the focus of two more major findings. First, in 1959 a skull identified as Zinjanthropus (now Paranthropus) boisei was found near Oldowan stone tools, and this led to the argument that this hominin could be a direct ancestor of modern humans. However, in 1964 a new fossil (OH 7) was also found in association with the aforementioned stone tools. The connection of this hominin with Oldowan stone tools and the fact that it seemed to have a larger brain than the australopiths led to its classification as Homo habilis (meaning "the handyman") and the assumption that stone tools were a distinctive feature of the genus Homo. The idea that the use of (stone) tools, and thus culture, was a unique characteristic of the genus Homo was not empirically challenged until 2010 and 2015 with the discovery of what could be the earliest archaeological evidence of cut-marked bones and stone tools respectively. However, the classification of H. habilis as part of the genus Homo became controversial soon after its discovery due to the use of cultural traits to justify hominin taxonomy. Recently, the idea that human ancestors have been responsible for intentionally making stone tools has also been put into question through primate archaeology research.

Towards the end of the twentieth-century, archaeology shifted from a focus on typological classifications towards an interest in understanding the mechanisms behind the origins and subsequent evolution of stone tools. This conceptual turn led to the initial establishment of experiments bringing archaeology and primatology together. Inspired by Jane Goodall's report of chimpanzee tool use, in 1972 Wright decided to teach a captive orangutan (Pongo pygmaeus) named Abang to make Oldowan flakes by striking a flint core to then use the flakes to open a box through imitative learning and some hand molding. Abang was capable of making and using the flakes only after multiple trials and not very efficiently, yet it has been suggested that this inefficiency could be the result of his upbringing in captivity. A couple of decades later, Kathy Schick and Nicholas Toth developed a similar experiment initially with a single captive, enculturated bonobo (Pan paniscus) named Kanzi to see whether he could copy Oldowan stone tool making. In subsequent experiments, more enculturatd bonobos started to make and use stone tools after seeing Kanzi. The skills of these bonobos were said to be rudimentary, and even though they were taught to use freehand knapping (one stone core is held in one hand and another stone in the other hand) their preferred method to make flakes involved throwing the stone core against a hard surface. In 1994, Westergaard and Suomi decided to redo the Abang and Kanzi type of experiments but this time they ran a baseline study (no demonstrations) with a group of unenculturated monkeys - capuchins (Sapajus [Cebus] apella). These capuchins had no exposure to stone tool making prior or during the study, and they were unenculturated - and so anystone tool use they would show should therefore be considered spontaneous. In this experiment, the unenculturated capuchins spontaneously began to produce flakes by striking stones against hard surfaces. Like Kanzi, they did not use the freehand knapping technique normally associated with the Oldowan. Researchers did not attempt further experiments involving non-human primates trying to make and use stone tools until around 2020 - when further baseline studies were run, this time with a focus on the performance of unenculturated apes. In this way, orangutans got tested, as did chimpanzees and gorillas. These experiments combined the use of baselines with that of demonstration conditions.

=== Primatology ===
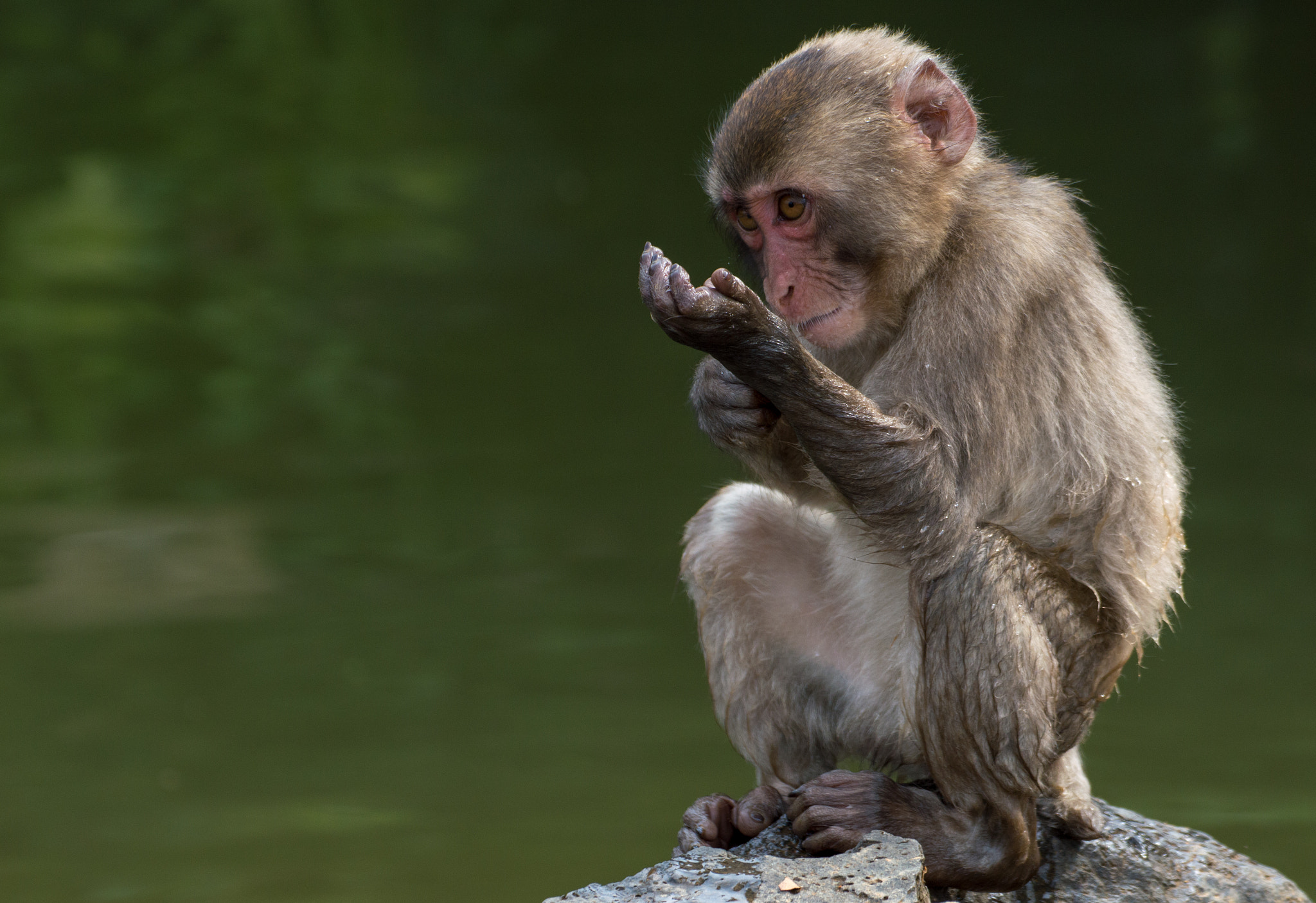
Japanese macaque (Macaca fuscata)

Although there are prior examples of studies looking into non-human primates across Western countries, the modern study of primate behavior originated in Japan. The first international journal in primatology, Primates_{,} was created in Japan in 1957. Japanese primatology was established through the observation of free-ranging Japanese macaques (Macaca fuscata) by Jun'ichiro Itani, Kinji Imanishi and Shunzo Kawamura. The main aim of these first primatologists was to understand the social structure of the macaques groups they were observing. Following their prior expertise in the individual identification of wild horses, they began to give nicknames to each monkey. Furthermore, to habituate the monkeys to their presence, they began to give them food while they established a long-term observation method. A few years later, in one of the Japanese macaque sites, a young female, later nicknamed "Imo", was observed washing a sweet potato in a small stream. After this instance, Kawamura began more systematic observations of this behavior discovering the propagation of sweet-potato washing among other members of the group. As a result of the sweet-potato washing phenomenon, Japanese primatologists started to draw the first direct associations of the terms culture and subculture in association with non-human animals. Another major contribution of Japanese primatology took place with the foundation in 1978 of the ape-language project (later named Ai project) at the Primate Research Institute of Kyoto University with the collaboration of Kiyoko Murofushi, Toshio Asano and Tetsuro Matsuzawa. Although the Ai project had a focus on language acquisition their methods emphasized the cognitive capabilities more than the communicative skills of the monkeys. Through projects of this kind, Japanese primatology highlighted the importance of merging both field and experimental settings for the study of primate behavior and cognition.

The contributions of paleoanthropologist and archaeologist Louis Leakey are also notable in the field of primatology. Leakey believed in the importance of studying non-human primates to better understand human evolution. It was Leakey who encouraged Jane Goodall, Dian Fossey, and Birutė Galdikas to study chimpanzee, gorilla, and orangutan socioecology and behavior. Goodall, Fossey, and Galdikas pioneered the establishment of long-term primatological sites in which the habituation of the primates through trust was of key importance. Their work continues to leave an impact on the way non-human primate sites are managed, as well as on the study of behavioral connections between non-human primates and early humans.

The publication of Andrew Whiten and colleagues' paper about chimpanzee cultures reinforced the prior conversations about culture in non-human primates that began during the 1950s and 1960s. However, the question as to how to define culture is a focus of debate across primatologists and other researchers such as anthropologists and archaeologists even today. The main disagreement is whether only humans can have culture, or if it is possible to see cultural traits in non-human animals. Overall, most definitions of a culture accepting its existence amongst non-human primates agree that culture includes behaviors that can vary in their expression between social groups, are maintained across generations, and are socially transmitted between the members of the same group.

However, this debate is not only about whether non-human primates have culture, but also about what mechanisms maintain cultural variation. Some accounts emphasise the copying of behavioural forms, whereas Tennie and colleagues' “zone of latent solutions” hypothesis proposes that many ape behaviours can be individually reinvented, with social learning affecting their frequency without necessarily transmitting the behavioural form itself.

=== Official birth ===
On top of the experimental work with non-human primates towards the end of the twentieth century, archaeologists began to observe chimpanzees in the wild to try to understand their behaviour and possible spatial patterns present in their living spaces. However, the real breakthrough took place with the discovery of Panda 100, the first excavated chimpanzee nut-cracking archaeological site located in the Taï Forest, Ivory Coast and dated to around 4000 years ago. This site finally reinforced the idea that the combination of primatological and archaeological methods could shed light on both contemporary and past primate (human and non-human) behavior. Researchers realized that chimpanzees, and probably other non-human primates too, could create long-lasting patterns of material evidence that could be linked to their current behavior while they are creating that material record.

After the publication of Carvalho, Cunha, Sousa and Matsuzawa in 2008 of what is considered one of the first studies merging archaeology and ethology from an evolutionary perspective, primate archaeology began to formalize. Discussions about primate archaeology developing into a discipline became more concrete in 2009 at the Paleoanthropology meets Primatology conference. It was this conference that led to the publication of the first article encouraging the official establishment of primate archaeology as a research field. After this first publication, studies and discoveries in primate archaeology started to grow exponentially.

== Tool-use in non-human primates ==
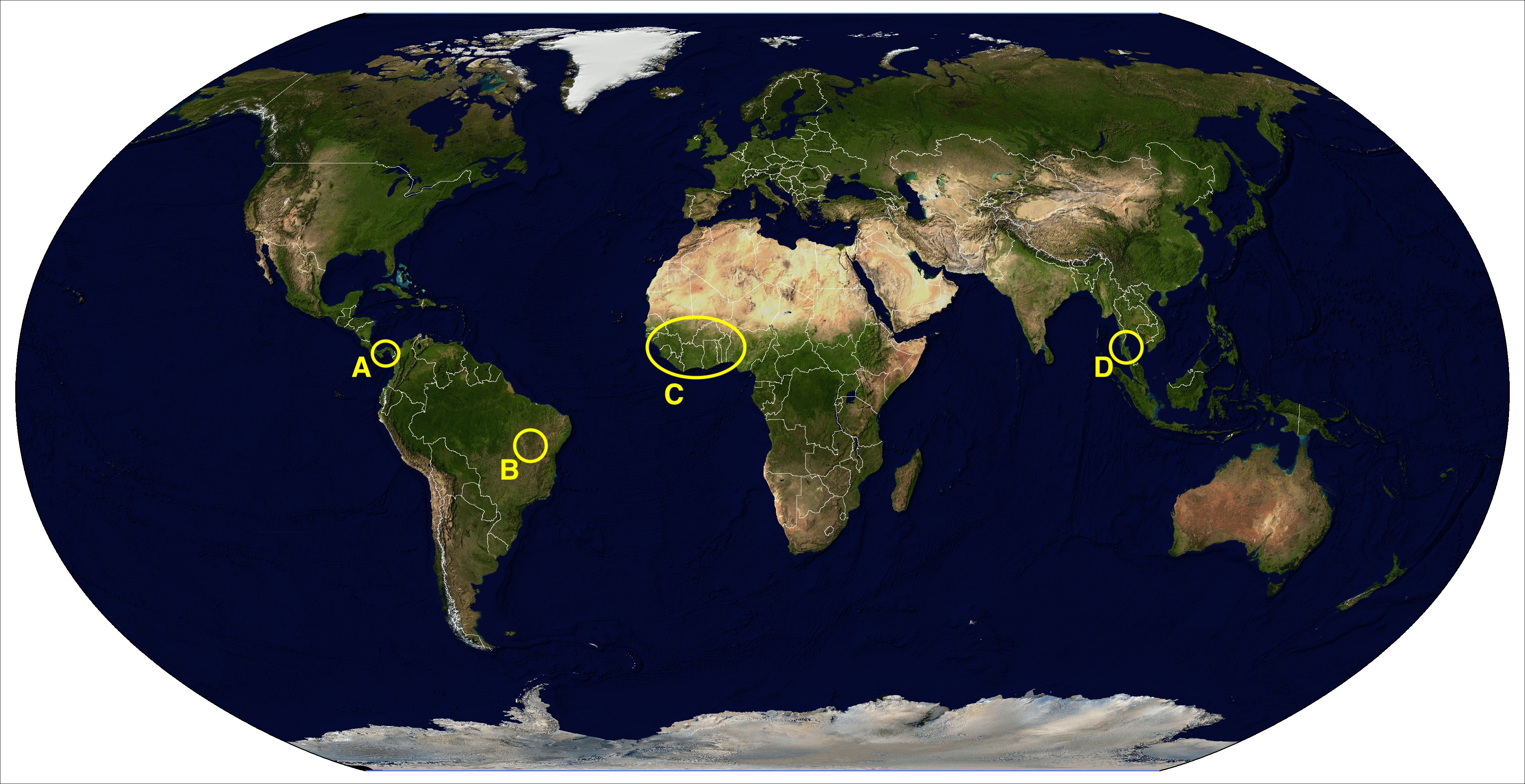
Locations of wild non-human primates using tools: (A) white-faced capuchins (Cebus capucinus); (B) bearded capuchins (Sapajus libidinosus); (C) West African chimpanzees (Pan troglodytes); (D) Burmese long-tailed macaques (Macaca fascicularis aurea).

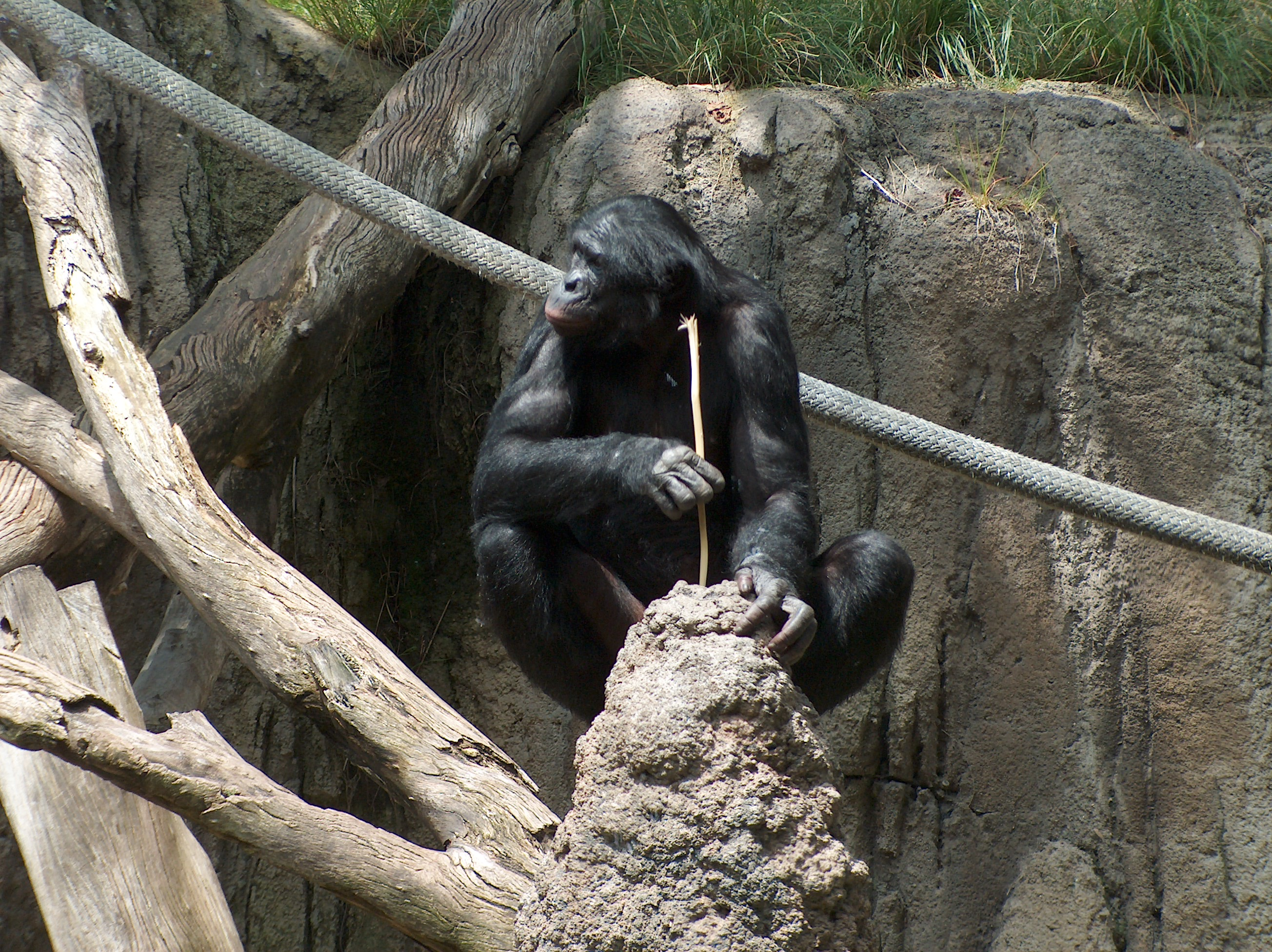
Bonobo (sister taxon of the chimpanzee) doing termite fishing.

The earliest written report of tool use in non-human primates dates to 1844 and it describes chimpanzees cracking nuts. In The Descent of Man, Charles Darwin used this initial report to mention the possible existence of culture and art in non-human primates. Furthermore, in 1887 Carpenter observed long-tailed macaques (Macaca fascicularis aurea) pounding oysters using stones. After these anecdotal reports, most of the early accounts of non-human primates' tool use came from the work of psychologists with captive subjects. Most of this work took place in Europe during the early twentieth century with examples such as the Anthropoid Station in Tenerife (Spain) dedicated to experimental research with large prosimians. Nonetheless, the most well-known example of the initial recognition of tool use in primates is Jane Goodall's report on chimpanzee termite fishing.

When it comes to reconstructing past hominin behaviors, the use of non-human primates engaging in similar activities as the ones in the archaeological record is considered by some researchers as a viable methodology.

However, there are still some skeptics that question the use of extant non-human primates as analogies of hominin tool use behaviors. This scepticism is based on anatomical differences between extant and extinct primates, the possible convergent evolution of similar behaviors, the diversity of past and present environments, and the amount of time that has gone by since the last common ancestor of different non-human primates and humans. However, there is a mid-ground to this disagreement, which involves discerning which parts of different non-human primate species could be used as valid evolutionary models. Overall, the consensus points towards the use of multi-species comparative primate models given that different taxa provide distinct benefits when it comes to understanding early hominins.

For example, a recent primate archaeology example of the use of non-human primates as viable models is the consolidation of the "by-product hypothesis" for the origins of stone tools. The observation of chimpanzees causing the detachment of fractured stones from stone anvils as a consequence of missed hits led some researchers to propose the idea that early hominins could have found themselves in similar situations and saw the mis-hits as opportunities to directly use the by-products or as examples of how to make flaked stone tools. However, the "by-product hypothesis" has gained more attention after primate archaeology field experiments demonstrated that nut-cracking behavior can facilitate the production of reasonable numbers of sharp-edged flakes.

=== Chimpanzees (Pan troglodytes) ===
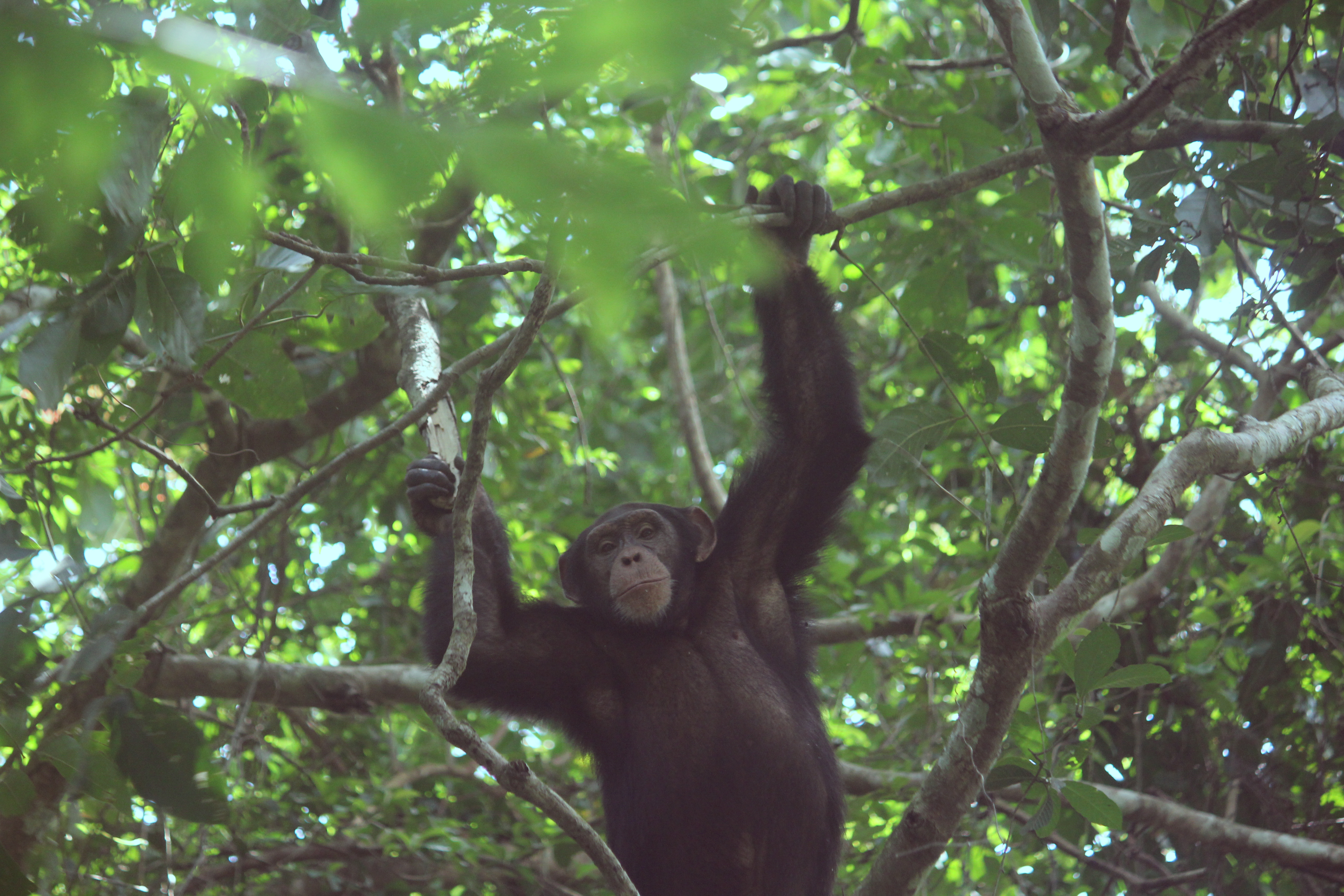
Chimpanzee at the Bossou forest.

Chimpanzees are the most widely studied non-human primates both in the wild and in captivity particularly when it comes to tool use. After more than a century of intensive observation, researchers began to see the broad range of behavioral variations present across chimpanzee populations. During the late 1990s, chimpanzees were thought to have 39 behavioral variants (not all associated with tool use) across six habituated African populations (Bossou, Taï forest, Kibale, Gombe, Budongo, Mahale M-group, Mahale K-group). Some of these behavioral variants were only present in certain groups whereas others were shared amongst multiple groups independent of ecological factors. These findings served as the foundation for the argument of culture in chimpanzees, and thus in other non-human primates.

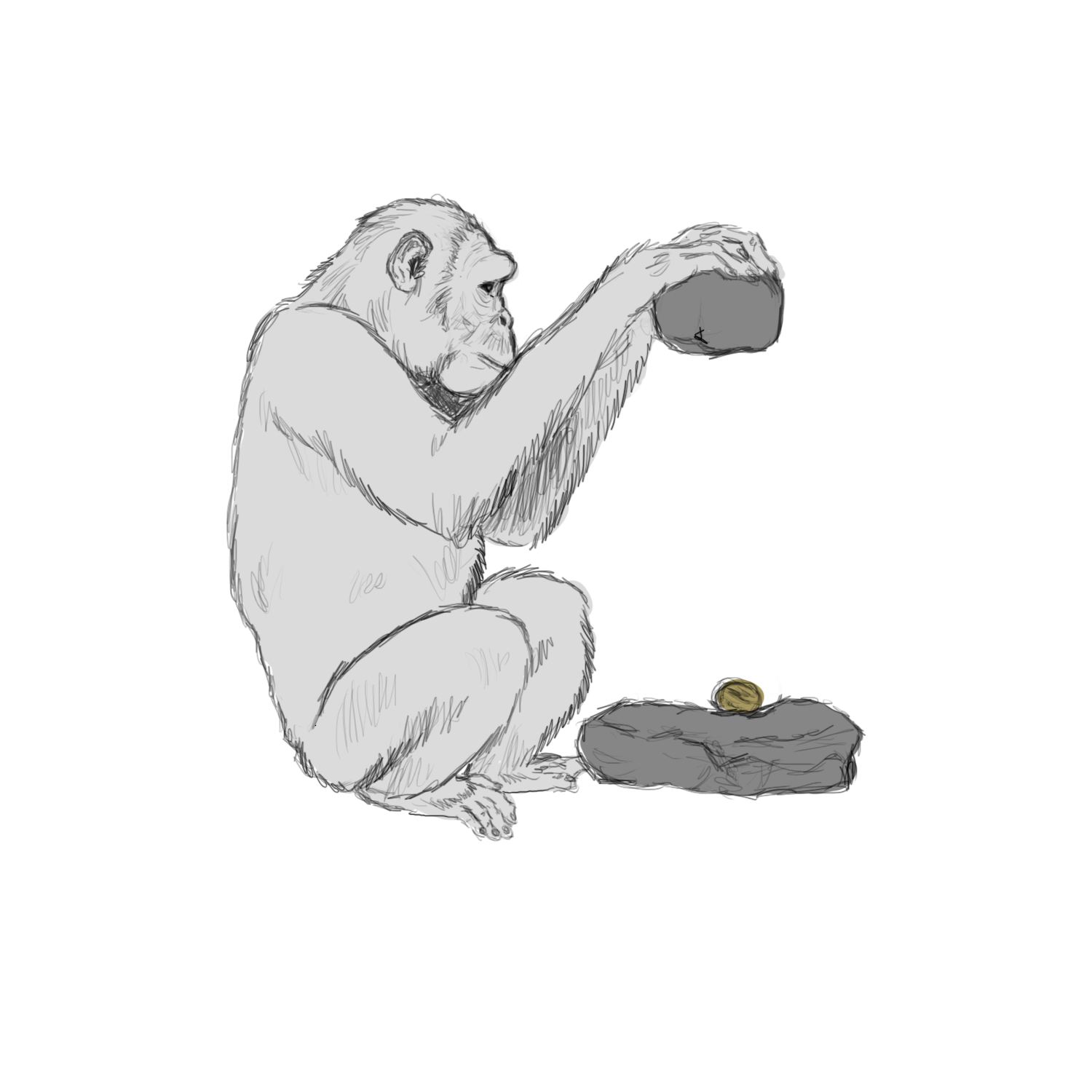
Representation of chimpanzee nut-cracking.

Some of the most well-known tool use examples in chimpanzees include ant dipping, wood boring, honey fishing, leaf sponging, and nut-cracking. However, chimpanzees also use tools for accessing the bone marrow of other normally smaller non-human primates, and even for medicinal purposes by swallowing leaves. Chimpanzees are also capable of using two or more tools in a sequential order to achieve an end goal such as termite fishing or obtaining honey. Moreover, chimpanzees can create compound tools in which two or more individual implements are combined to form a single working tool.

Chimpanzees' use of stone tools in foraging activities is extensive, yet the most well-known example is nut-cracking. Although some chimpanzees in the Ebo Forest of Cameroon have been indirectly observed cracking nuts, it is generally assumed that chimpanzee nut-cracking in the wild is restricted to West Africa. The reasons behind this phenomenon are not clear. Researchers have suggested that this could be the result of cultural transmission, more than ecological pressures given that both nut-cracking and the absence of it can be seen in closely located chimpanzee populations we can. Moreover, nut-cracking techniques can vary between chimpanzee populations with some groups like those in Bossou using stones as anvils and groups like those in the Taï forest using tree roots. Likewise, nut-cracking efficiency also differs across groups. Chimpanzees can actively choose different stone types depending on the distance they had to travel to the selected anvil (heavier stones the shorter the distance), or the type of anvil they were going to use showing an ability to anticipate future sequential events.

=== Robust capuchins (genus Sapajus) ===
Capuchin stone tool use in the wild has been known at least since the eighteenth century, yet studies focusing on wild capuchin stone tool use became more common after the systematic observation of this behavior from the early 2000s. Prior to these observations in the wild, capuchin stone tool use was thought to only occur in captivity. Moreover, even though there has been indirect evidence of capuchins using stones for foraging in rainforest habitats, pounding behaviors such as nut-cracking seem to be associated with groups that spend most of their time on the ground or in savanna-like environments. Tool use in this taxon is mostly limited to wild robust (genus Sapajus) capuchins with the exception of one instance in which white-faced capuchins (Cebus capucinus imitator) have been observed using stones to forage coastal resources on the Coiba National Park, Panama. Traditionally capuchins have been assigned to a single genus (Cebus). However, from 2012 there has been a growing consensus on separating capuchins species between robust (genus Sapajus) and gracile (genus Cebus) mostly based on morphological and behavioral differences., yet this classification still remains controversial

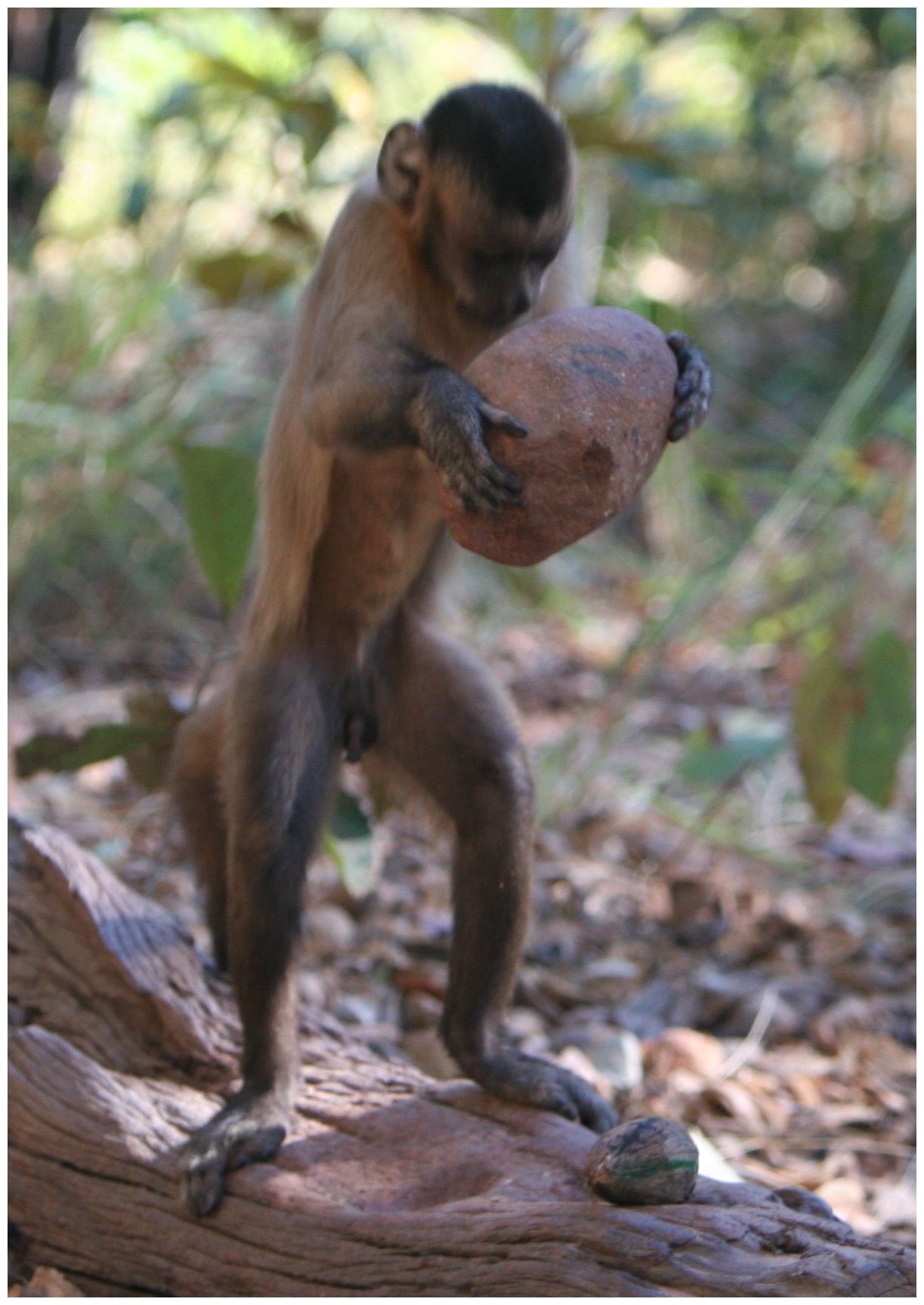
Bearded capuchin nut-cracking

There are four species of robust capuchins that have been observed using tools: S. apella, S. libidinosus, S. xanthosternos, and S. nigritus. For example, indirect evidence of several nut-cracking sites of S. xanthosternos has been reported in the State of Bahia, Brazil However, tool use is more frequently observed amongst populations of S. apella and S. libidinosus. In fact, most accounts of tool use in wild capuchin populations involve S. libidinosus, commonly known as black-stripped capuchins. This species of robust capuchins are found in the savanna-like environments of the Brazilian caatinga and cerrado. Even though black-stripped capuchins at the Serra da Capivara National Park have been observed using stones to cut wood for insects and to dig for tubers., the most widely studied tool use behavior in black-stripped capuchins is the use of stones to crack open encapsulated foods Capuchins are capable of actively selecting different stones depending on the type of encased foods they want to open. Moreover, this type of tool use takes multiple years of learning and it can involve not just conspecifics but also other members of the social group who are the most efficient at nut-cracking. Overall, the costs and benefits of cracking open encased foods using stones for capuchins vary across individuals. However, capuchins tend to be very efficient in this percussive behavior even though they can use stones that weight half their body mass.

Black-stripped capuchins at the Serra da Capivara National Park have also been observed engaging in "stone on stone" percussion which consists on striking a stone against a conglomerate. This behavior allows the capuchins to unintentionally break stones in a way that allows them to produce sharp-edged flakes that show similar traits to those observed in the Oldowan. The purpose of this "stone on stone" behavior is unclear, but it has been suggested that the capuchins consume the minerals that result from breaking the stones.

=== Long-tailed macaques (Macaca fascicularis aurea) ===
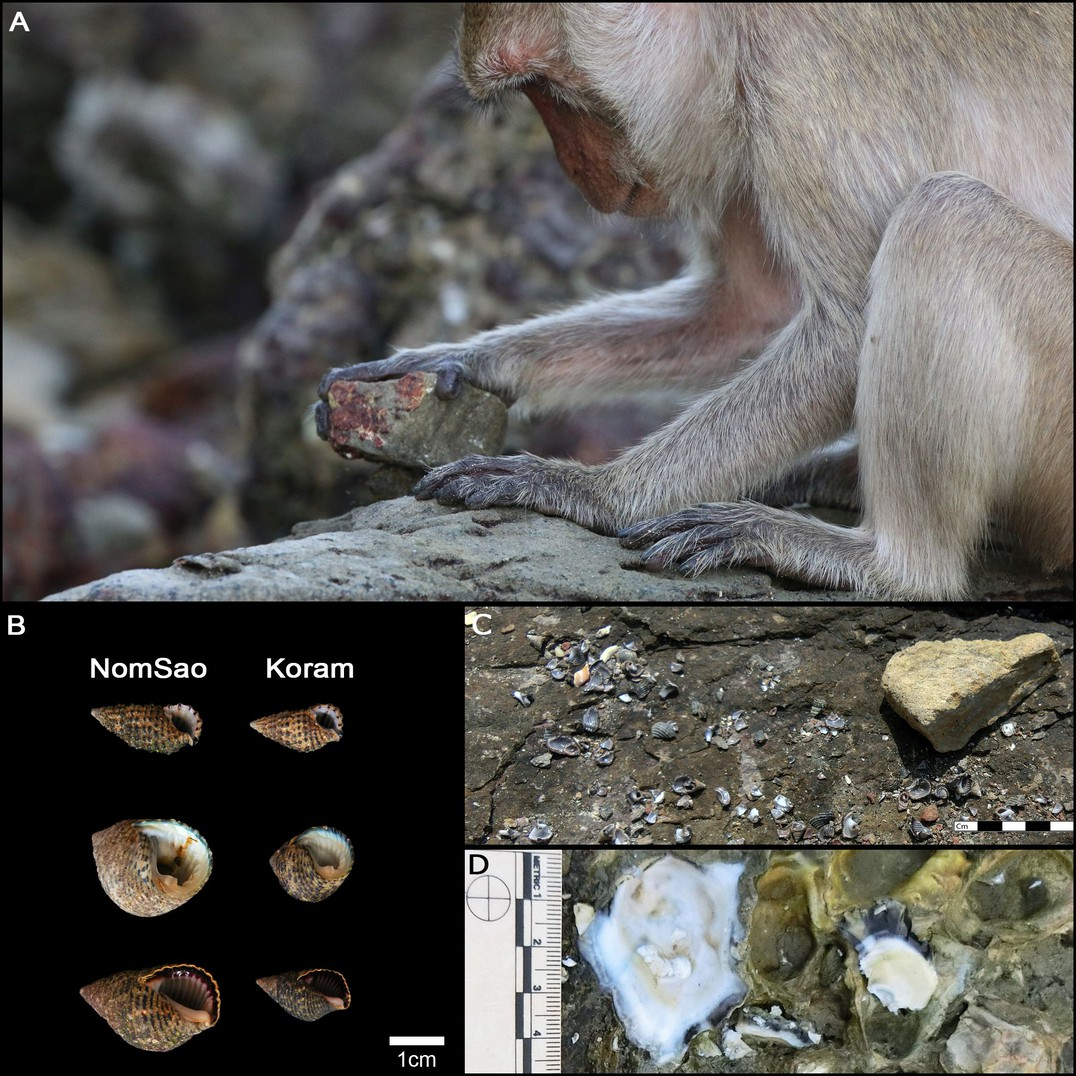
Long-tailed macaque tool use

Although tool use has also been reported in other macaque species (e.g., Macaca fuscata) primate archaeological research has focused on Thai long-tailed macaques (Macaca fascicularis aurea) given that stone tool use in this species is associated with foraging. After Carpenter's mention of long-tailed macaques doing oyster-cracking, there was virtually no mention of this type of behavior in the literature associated with this taxon. However, in 2007 this foraging behavior was observed in two long-tailed macaque populations inhabiting the Piak Nam Yai Island, Laem Son National Park in southern Thailand. It was this re-discovery of stone tool use for foraging that sparked the exponential growth of systematic studies on macaque tool use. A few years later, long-tailed macaques were also observed using stones to crack open oil palm nuts. Recent primate archaeology studies have discovered that long-tailed macaques choose different stone tool shapes based on individual preference and the different types of food they want to open. This prompted researchers to propose different terminology depending on the type of stone tools the macaques use. They normally differentiate between "point/axe hammering" associated with a smaller size with pointy ends, "pound/face hammering" associated with larger and rounder stones, and "edge hammering" mostly related to the use of the edge of the stone tool and applied both for cracking oysters and molluscs.

In long-tailed macaques, stone tool use seems to be restricted to the Macaca fascicularis aurea subspecies because Macaca fascicularis fascicularis has never been observed using tools in the wild or captivity. Both subspecies share the same habitat, but they have developed different strategies to forage similar resources. It is still not clear why this happens, but it has been suggested that it could be the result of a genetic component because long-tail hybrids of both Macaca fascicularis aurea and Macaca fascicularis fascicularis with a stronger component of the former show a bias towards the use of stones.

=== Other non-human primates ===
Although they have never been seen to undertake stone tool percussive activities in the wild, recent studies trying to comprehend the possible mechanisms behind the emergence of stone tool technology have started to run experiments with non-human primates in captivity, or in free-ranging environments. There seems to be a particular focus on great apes such as gorillas (Gorilla spp.), orangutans (Pongo spp.) and bonobos (Pan paniscus) due to their closer phylogenetic association with the genus Homo. However, experimental studies trying to understand the emergence of stone tool technology still show a clear bias towards bonobos and orangutans given that gorillas are yet to be seen to use stones as tools both in the wild and in captivity.

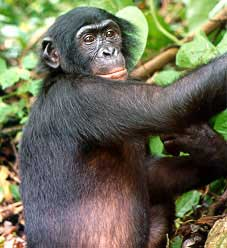
Bonobo (Pan paniscus)

Wild orangutans have never been seen using stone tools, but orangutans in captivity have been the focus of experimental studies testing their ability to use stone tools. For example, captive naïve orangutans have been reported to spontaneously use wooden hammers to crack open nuts. Following a similar pattern to Kanzi's experiments, experiments with captive orangutans demonstrated that when presented with the right learning stimulus this great ape can engage in stone tool use and manufacture. However, the flakes made by the captive orangutans were low in number and did not resemble stone flakes made by early hominins.

Although bonobos have been observed using tools in association with thirteen different behaviors only one of them, leaf sponging for drinking water, has a foraging purpose. Moreover, no stone tool use has been reported in wild bonobos. This contrasts with the forty-two different tool use behaviors observed in chimpanzees of which more than half are associated with foraging. The reason why bonobos and chimpanzees are so distinct in their tool use behaviors is still not clear. One possibility is that there are very few long-term wild-habituated bonobo sites (LuiKotale, Lomako and Wamba) which are very difficult to access. Another possible explanation is that chimpanzees and bonobos have different motivations (social, ecological or innate) that lead them to different predispositions when it comes to using tools. However, despite the absence of stone tool use in the wild, studies of bonobo tool use in captivity and free-ranging communities are becoming more common.

== Methods ==
=== Excavation and site formation processes ===
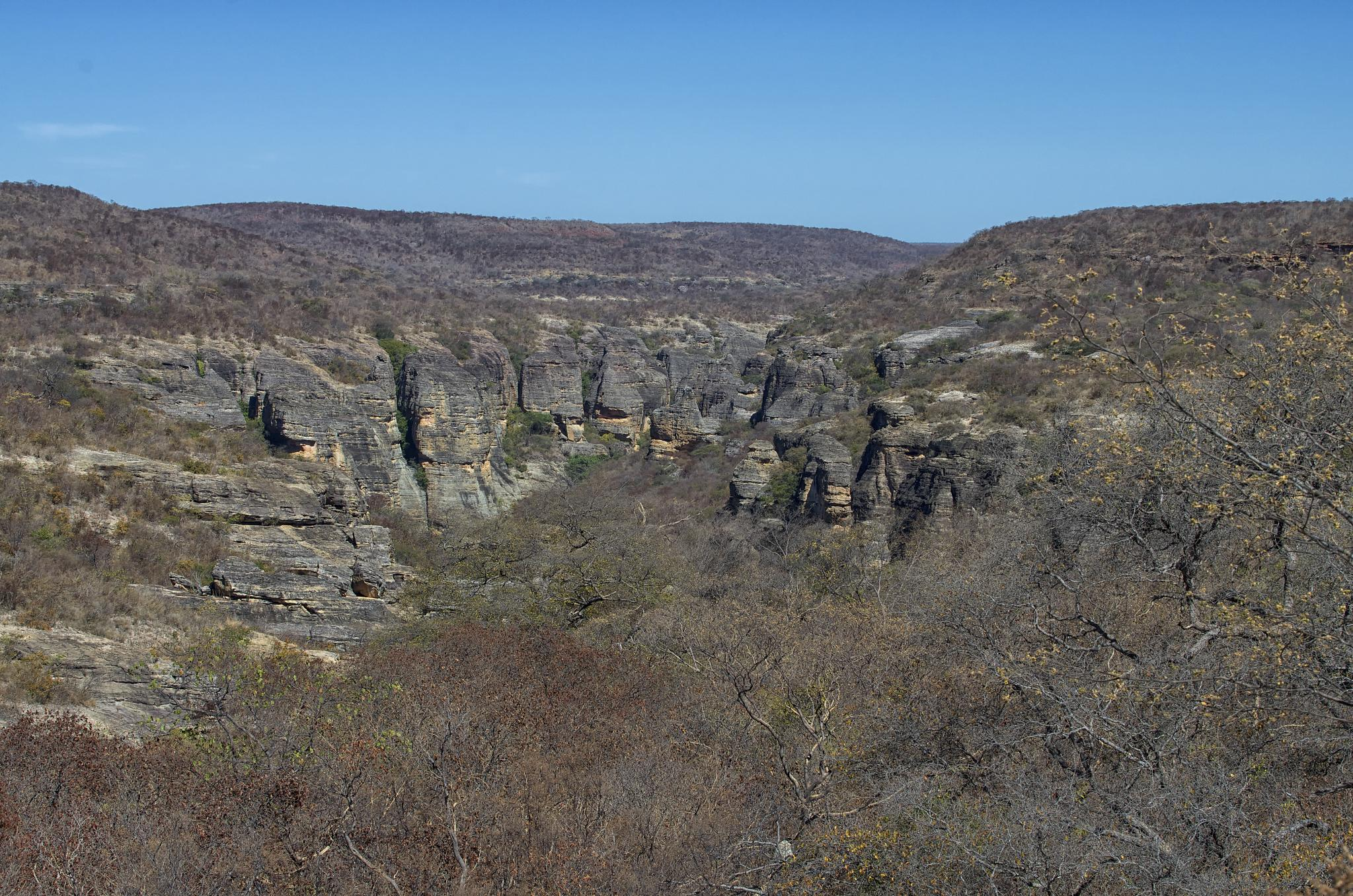
Serra da Capivara National Park.

In archaeology excavation is an essential element of the discipline because it allows archaeologists to trace when specific behaviors originated and their subsequent changes over time. Through excavation, archaeologists can obtain data on the chronology, the spatial distribution of the artefacts and the stratigraphic and depositional contexts of the site allowing them to reconstruct the natural and cultural events. that led to the formation of that particular site Particularly, in primate archaeology the excavation of non-human primate tool sites has proved to be valuable for tracing back the history of nut-cracking sites and investigating the changes of this particular percussive behavior. The first non-human primate archaeological site was found in 2002 in the Taï Forest, Ivory Coast, and it was associated with chimpanzee tool use dating back 4000 years. After this, in 2016 a group of primate archaeologists using archaeological methods discovered a long-tailed macaque archaeological site mapping shellfish processing activities at Piak Nam Yai Island, southern Thailand. Finally, another group of primate archaeologists discovered a capuchin nut-cracking site dated to around 2400 years ago at Serra da Capivara National Park, Brazil.

Archaeological excavation techniques can be time-consuming and costly. Furthermore, excavations are very invasive given that once you excavate something you will not be able to put it back into its original state. Primate archaeology has the advantage of being able to do present-day surface surveys because they study extant non-human primate behavior and their tools. Surface surveys allow primate archaeologists to look into the spatial distribution of the tools used by present non-human primates; thus, providing useful models to reconstruct past site formation processes. For example, a recent landscape agent-based modelling of chimpanzee nut-cracking stone tool fragments showed that nut-cracking sites have the potential to form dense clusters of stone tools that scatter across the landscape.

=== Use-wear and residue analysis ===
Use-wear is a technique that consists of identifying the different damage marks present on stone tool edges to understand how toolmakers used these implements. Before the expansion of major technological advances in archaeology, use-wear analyses were mostly done from a qualitative and macroscopic perspective. However, with the inclusion of microscopes and 3D scanners, use-wear analyses began to be approached more from a microscopic and quantitative perspective. Through use-wear analyses, primate archaeologists can design a protocol that can allow them to differentiate stones that have been used as tools from those that were not even if they cannot observe the primates' behavior. Likewise, in some instances they are also capable of reconstructing the particular behavior the tool was used for. For example, through the use-wear analysis of percussive tools using 3D surface morphometrics, archaeologists discovered that different macaque behaviours leave specific traces on the stones.

Residue analysis adds another dimension to use-wear studies by looking into residual evidence that is left on tool edges. Normally, tools are inspected using use-wear techniques and if relevant residues are found within traces they will be extracted and further analysed. This method allows primate archaeologists to know the exact foods that non-human primates are processing with stones, even if they cannot observe the behavior. For example, a recent study looked into bearded capuchin monkey pounding tools from Serra da Capivara, Brazil. In this study, researchers found that traces on capuchin stone tools reflect behavioral differences. The application of these techniques in primate archaeology allows researchers to begin to draw comparisons between the tools used by different non-human primate species, and contrast those tools with the stones found in the archaeological record.

=== Technological analysis ===
Lithic technological analysis entails the study of the different attributes present in stone tools such as flakes through measurements, qualitative observations and possible subsequent typological classifications. With the added method of 3D geometric morphometrics, archaeologists can develop a more in-depth and quantitative analysis of the morphological variation present in stone tools.

The application of these methods in primate archaeology has generated studies that are capable of comparing the flakes unintentionally produced by non-human primate species with flakes associated with hominins in the archaeological record. Chimpanzees, robust capuchins and long-tailed macaques use stone tools to crack encased foods, and even though they can be quite efficient they can still have mishits. These mishits can end up unintentionally producing flakes that could resemble the flakes produced by hominins. Thus, to test the extent of the differences and similarities between non-human primate and hominin flakes, primate archaeologists have used technological and 3D geometric morphometric analyses to compare capuchin quartzite "stone on stone" flakes with flakes produced by a contemporary human knapper using freehand and passive hammer knapping. Moreover, in this study primate archaeologists also compared the capuchin unintentional flakes with Oldowan flakes. Overall, these analyses concluded that most of the technological attributes present in the capuchin unintentional flakes are shared with the intentionally made flakes, yet some substantial differences (e.g., external platform angle) could help to differentiate these non-human primate flakes from those found in the archaeological record. Likewise, technological analysis has been used to study the attributes of archaeological flakes found in the chimpanzee nut-cracking site of Panda 100 allowing primate archaeologists to create data that can be used to find more sites and also to better understand modern chimpanzees tool use.

== Implications for the study of human evolution ==
Most of the major contributions of primate archaeology are associated with the importance of finding the earliest stone tools. The search for the origins of stone tool use and making has been one of the major aims of archaeology almost since it became a discipline. Moreover, reconstructing the emergence of stone tool technology in human evolution goes hand in hand with questions in biological anthropology about the behavior and anatomical constraints of early hominins. Through the analysis of present-day non-human primate stone tool use primate archaeology provides a unique opportunity to compare observed behaviors with the tools and the traces they leave behind.

Primate archaeological research has been able to challenge the view that only stone tools could have played an essential role in shaping human evolution. Organic tool use such as leaves and twigs in non-human primates points towards the also likely existence on these types of tools in all hominins. Moreover, the occurrence of tool use and even the unintentional production of flakes in extant non-human primates questions the idea that only hominins were the sole creators of archaeological sites. The discovery of chimpanzee, macaque and capuchin archaeological sites further strengthen that perspective. The use of tools by this wide range of non-human primate taxa also provides data in the reconstruction of the different environmental, anatomical, behavioral and/or genetic factors that could lead to the emergence and subsequent evolution of stone tool manufacture and use across different species.

The question of whether non-human animals have human-like culture has been the focus of debate in disciplines such as primatology for many decades. Although the non-human animal culture controversy is far from being over, primate archaeology has contributed to this debate with several recent studies. A primate archaeology study in 2015 suggested the existence of social learning and cumulative culture in chimpanzees given that they could not introduce nut-cracking independently. To test the hypothesis of cumulative culture in chimpanzees, a recent study tested whether a group of chimpanzees at Seringbara (Nimba Mountains, Guinea) could independently re-invent nut-cracking. This study concluded that chimpanzee nut-cracking requires social learning because the observed chimpanzees could not re-invent nut-cracking despite being in ecologically valid conditions. However, these primate archaeology studies still find opposition from scholars that firmly believe in the absence of cumulative culture in non-human primates, who pointed out that the tested chimpanzees lacked a food interest in the provided nuts.

Moreover, the involvement of primate archaeology in the non-human animal culture debate has been extended to questions on the existence or lack thereof of human-like culture in the early archaeological record. Through the use of non-human primate tool-use behaviors, researchers try to reconstruct when, how, and why humans began to rely on high-fidelity cultural transmission. Previous experiments run with unenculturated capuchin monkeys and orangutans which found spontaneous reinnovation of stone-tool making inspired the possibility that early stone tools such as the Oldowan, and even the Acheulean, may not have been know-how requiring social learning - thus, they may not have been early examples of cumulative culture. The possible re-innovation of stone tool making was tested in a recent experiment with naïve humans who were never exposed to stone tool knapping know-how. Overall, most subjects of this experiment were able to independently make stone tools - using all four known early knapping techniques. Nonetheless, the debate as to whether early stone tools reflect cumulative culture or not is still not settled.

== See also ==
- Lomekwi
- History of archaeology
