= Cantanhez Forests National Park =

National park in Guinea-Bissau

- Parque Nacional das Florestas de Cantanhez
- Location within Guinea-Bissau
- Location: Guinea-Bissau
- Coordinates: 11.26461°N 15.02930°W
- Area: 1,057 km^{2} (408 sq mi)
- Established: 2007

The Cantanhez Forests National Park (in Portuguese: Parque Nacional das Florestas de Cantanhez) is a 1,057 km^{2} (408 sq mi) national park in southern Guinea-Bissau, lying close to the international border with Guinea. It was established on 1 October 2007.

== Environment ==
The park includes floodplain and mangrove habitats on the north-western bank of the upper Rio Cacine, as well as savanna and semi-humid tropical forest. Tree vegetation is dominated by Afzelia africana, Alstonia congensis, Antiaris africana, Ceiba pentandra, Dialium guineense, Ficus spp. and Parinari excelsa. Rain is seasonal, usually with no more than 2,600 mm per annum, falling between May and November.

The park is bordered by the Cacine River and Atlantic Ocean to the south, the Balana River to the north, the Cumbinjã River to the west and the Republic of Guinea and the Cacine River to the east.

=== Wildlife ===
The park is home to a population of western chimpanzees which have been the subject of international studies, including that by Portuguese primatologist Claudia Sousa.

The park has also been designated an Important Bird Area (IBA) by BirdLife International because it supports significant populations of a wide variety of bird species, including many waterbirds.
