= Ethnoprimatology =

Ethnoprimatology is the study of human and nonhuman primate interactions or interface. Anthropologists coined the term to refer to research between human and nonhuman primate interactions in regions where they co-exist.

In primatology, the interface between humans and other primates is generally described as competition for space and resources, a contest between humans and other primates. But many researchers consider competition only one aspect of the co-ecologies involving humans and other primates. This emerging approach, ethnoprimatology, explicitly acknowledges of the multifarious nature of human–nonhuman primate relationships (Fuentes and Wolfe 2002, Fuentes and Hockings 2010).

== Case studies in mythology ==
=== South America ===
Among the Barí of Venezuela, their myth states that monkeys, especially spider monkeys were once people.

In the creation myths of Matsigenka mythology, humans were the first to inhabit the Earth and they were slowly transformed into different animal species, starting with primates. At a party, Yavireri, the first shaman, transformed two groups of people into woolly monkeys and spider monkeys.

Another Matsigenka myth describing the origins of primate species is that of Yari and Osheto. Yari was a lazy shaman who imbibed hallucinogens (ayahuasca) and sang songs all day. He would borrow beans from his brother-in-law Osheto, a spider monkey, and eat them rather than sow and harvest. Then he would return to Osheto requesting more, claiming his harvest failed to grow. When Osheto discovered this deceit, he punched Yari in the throat, causing it to become swollen, like that of a howler monkey. Yaniri was then transformed into a howler monkey as punishment.

In a similar story, two shamans on a failed quest to steal fire-making technology from an all-female group were transformed into primates. One of the shamans burned the hair off his face and in turn was transformed into the brown capuchin monkey. The other became intoxicated and fell head first into a woman's toilet, and was transformed into a white-fronted capuchin.

The pygmy marmoset, also known as "mother of the wind" and "wind tail" by the Matsigenka, is thought to be magical as well as dangerous. Its name precedes its reputation, leading hunters astray and vanishing in an instant, leaving the hunter lost. The spider monkeys, although hunted by the Matsigenka, are seen as unafraid of humans, often revealing themselves in acts of territorial display. This disturbs the Matsigenka, who view these displays as demonic. Because of their loud vocalization, it is thought the howler monkeys are shamans, and thus "pose spiritual hazards as well". Howler monkey meat is believed to make children lazy, and capuchins meat is believed to make them dishonest as adults.

=== Central America ===
In one account outlined in the K'iche' Maya sacred text, the Popol Vuh, the gods created animals first, but were displeased when they could not speak or worship them. They then tried to make humans out of mud, but the mud people simply came undone. The gods once again attempted to make humans out of wood. The wood people, however, were stiff, could barely move, and did not understand and thus did not respect their makers. The gods angrily destroyed them with rains and flood, and those wood people who escaped became spider monkeys. The spider monkeys were morphologically similar to humans but still lacked the ability to speak. In a different part of the Popol Vuh, Hunbatz (which literally means 1 Howler monkey) and Hunchouen (1 Spider monkey) are the older brothers of the Hero Twins. The Hero Twins won the favor of the gods after they defeated the gods of darkness and death. Naturally, Hunbatz and Hunchouen were jealous, and were always trying to find ways to end their brothers. One day, tired of their brothers' jealousy, the Hero Twins led their older brothers to a tree and convinced them to climb it, asking them to retrieve birds they had stunned with a blow gun. When they arrived at the top, the tree grew and grew until the brothers were trapped and thus turned into monkeys. In their human form, Hunbatz and Hunchouen were efficient in arts and craftsmanship, and these monkey twins are seen as patron gods to this discipline.

=== Africa ===
The Dahomey mythology of West Africa includes a myth telling of why monkeys did not become humans. Mawu, a creator of animals, made all the animals out of clay. When she decided she was not yet done, she assigned all the existing animals to work the clay so she may use it to mold other creatures. She came upon the monkey and said "As you have five fingers on each hand, if you work well, I will put you among men, instead of among animals". The monkey then became excited and boasted to all the animals that he was going to be a man. Because he was distracted in his happiness, he did not work well. When Mawu saw this, she said to him "You will always be Monkey, you will never walk erect".

Other African tales depict monkeys doing human-like things. One South African tale tells of monkeys playing a fiddle and dancing. The Nuer believe God made monkeys to be like humans, depicting them cooking and even grieving.

=== India ===
The epic poem the Ramayana plays a central role in Hindu culture. In the epic, Rama, an incarnation of Vishnu, is exiled along with his brother and his wife, Sita. Sita is kidnapped, and in their quest to rescue her, they come across monkey-chief Sugriva, who has been similarly exiled. After helping Sugriva reclaim the throne, Sugriva agrees to help Rama find Sita, and sends them Hanuman, a monkey warrior with divine parents.

Hanuman becomes a central character in the Ramayana. He flies across an ocean to find Sita in Lanka. However, Sita refuses to be saved by Hanuman, insisting on being rescued by her husband Rama. Sita's kidnapper sets Hanuman's tail ablaze, which then sets fire to most of the city. Hanuman returns with Rama and Sugriva's army of monkeys, and they battle to rescue Sita. Hanuman here displays supernatural feats, moving mountains and growing to immense size. After Rama wins, Hanuman continues to play an important role throughout the Ramayana, and is argued to be the hero of the epic. Hanuman is often depicted as having human features, with only a monkey-like mouth to give away his true form. He is praised for his strength, courage, and devotion to Rama.

Today, the rhesus macaques and the Hanuman langur commonly roam the streets and temples of India. On Tuesdays and Saturdays, holy days which represent the good deeds of Hanuman, they are brought an abundance of foods. Because of this, there has been a population boom of monkeys in urban areas. This has forced locals to keep their windows and doors tightly shut, lest monkeys raid their homes. Government officials claim to have lost important files to monkeys. The monkeys have bitten people and threatened visiting foreign dignitaries. Attempts to control the monkey population, including relocation, sterilization, and outlawing feeding them, have been ineffective.
