= Folia Primatologica =

- Discipline: Primatology
- Language: English, German, French
- Edited by: K.A.I. Nekaris, C. Soligo

Publication details
- History: 1963–Present
- Publisher: Brill Publishers (Netherlands)
- Frequency: Bimonthly
- Impact factor: 1.246 (2020)

Standard abbreviations
- ISO 4: Folia Primatol.

Indexing
- ISSN: 0015-5713 (print); 1421-9980 (web)

Links
- Journal homepage

Folia Primatologica is an international peer-reviewed journal focusing on primatology, the study of monkeys, apes, lemurs, and other primates. Folia Primatologica was founded in 1963 by Adolph Hans Schultz, Helmut Hofer, Josef Biegert, and Dietrich Starck. Its start was preceded by two series of primatological monographs, both edited by the aforementioned founders, Primatologia (Handbook of Primatology), published in 1956, and Bibliotheca Primatologica, published in 1962.

Folia Primatologica is the official journal of the European Federation for Primatology, and official journal of the Primate Society of Great Britain. The journal covers diverse areas of primatology, including molecular biology, social behaviour, ecology, conservation, palaeontology, systematics and functional anatomy. Folia Primatologica is published six times per year. As of 2025, the editors-in-chief are K. A. I. Nekaris of Oxford Brookes University and Christophe Soligo of University College London. The journal is indexed with PubMed, Medline.

In August 2021 Karger announced that Folia Primatologica had been acquired by Brill Publishers, effective from 2022.
