= American Journal of Primatology =

- Discipline: Primatology, biological anthropology
- Language: English
- Edited by: Karen Bales

Publication details
- History: 1981—present
- Publisher: Wiley-Liss (United States)
- Frequency: Monthly
- Open access: Hybrid
- Impact factor: 2.371 (2020)

Standard abbreviations
- ISO 4: Am. J. Primatol.

Indexing
- CODEN: AJPTDU
- ISSN: 0275-2565 (print); 1098-2345 (web)
- LCCN: 81645893
- OCLC no.: 07113717

Links
- Journal homepage; Online access; Online archive

The American Journal of Primatology is a monthly peer-reviewed scientific journal and the official journal of the American Society of Primatologists. It was established in 1981 and covers all areas of primatology, including behavioral ecology, conservation biology, evolutionary biology, life history, demography, paleontology, physiology, endocrinology, genetics, molecular genetics, and psychobiology of non-human primates. Besides its regular issues, the journal publishes a yearly supplementary issue detailing the program of the society's annual meetings. The editor-in-chief is Karen Bales (UC Davis). The types of papers published are: original research papers, review articles, book reviews, commentaries, and plenary addresses.

According to the Journal Citation Reports, the journal has a 2020 impact factor of 2.371, ranking it 35th out of 175 journals in the category "Zoology".
