= Agustín Fuentes =

American primatologist and biological anthropologist

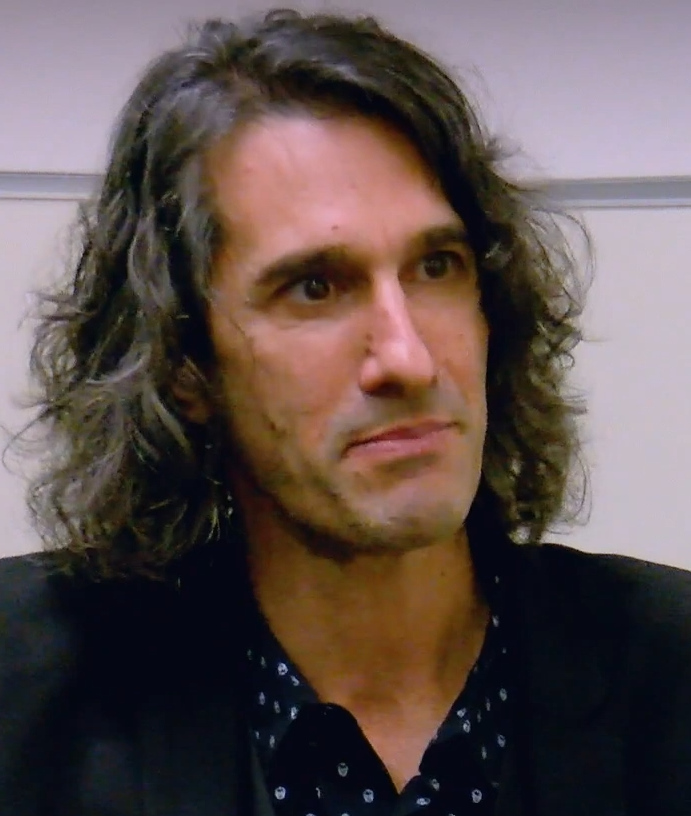
- Fuentes in 2020
- Born: July 30, 1966 (age 60); Santa Barbara, California, U.S.
- Education: University of California, Berkeley
- Scientific career
- Fields: Anthropology
- Workplaces: Princeton University; University of Notre Dame
- Thesis: The socioecology of the Mentawai Island langur (Presbytis potenziani) (1994)
- Doctoral advisor: Phyllis J. Dolhinow

Agustín Fuentes is an American primatologist and biological anthropologist at Princeton University and formerly the chair of the Department of Anthropology at the University of Notre Dame. His work focuses largely on human and non-human primate interaction, pathogen transfer, communication, cooperation, and human social evolution.

== Education and career ==
Fuentes was born on July 30, 1966 in Santa Barbara, California, a son of Madrid-born hispanist Víctor Fuentes. He graduated from the University of California, Berkeley with a B.A. in Anthropology and Zoology, as well as an M.A. and PhD in Anthropology. He has since been researching fields of biological anthropology and primatology, exploring the entanglement of biological systems with the social and cultural dimensions. He began his academic career at Central Washington University and most recently served at the University of Notre Dame in a number of different roles, including Director of the Institute for Scholarship in the Liberal Arts as well as Professor and Chair of the Department of Anthropology. Beginning in fall 2020, he has served as professor in the Department of Anthropology at Princeton University. Fuentes was elected as a member of the American Academy of Arts and Sciences in 2020.

== Work ==
One of Fuentes' major impacts on the field of primatology has been his work on human and non-human primate interactions. He has worked extensively with populations of macaques in Bali and Gibraltar, where the monkeys are a large tourist attraction, focusing on the spread of diseases between humans and macaques.

In 2021, Fuentes co-founded the Long-Tailed Macaque Project.

== Select publications ==
=== Books ===
- A. Fuentes (2025). Sex Is a Spectrum. Princeton: Princeton University Press. ISBN 978-0-691-24941-4.
- A. Fuentes. 2019 Why We Believe: Evolution and the Human Way of Being. Yale University Press. ISBN 978-0-300-24399-4
- A. Fuentes. 2017 The Creative Spark: How Imagination Made Humans Exceptional. Dutton (Penguin Random House). ISBN 978-1-101-98394-2
- A. Fuentes. 2012 Race, Monogamy and Other Lies They Told You: Busting myths about human behavior. University of California Press. ISBN 978-0-520-26971-2
- C. Campbell, A. Fuentes, K. MacKinnon, S. Bearder, R. Stumpf P. Dolhinow, A. Fuentes, eds. 2010. The Nonhuman Primates. 2d ed. Oxford: Oxford University Press. ISBN 978-0-19-539043-8
- A. Fuentes. 2008. Evolution of Human Behavior. Oxford: Oxford University Press. ISBN 978-0-19-533358-9
- C. Panter-Brick, A. Fuentes, eds. 2008. Health, Risk and Adversity. New York/Oxford: Berghahn Books ISBN 978-1-84545-455-5
- A. Fuentes. 2006. Core Concepts in Biological Anthropology. New York: McGraw-Hill. ISBN 978-0-7674-2426-4
- A. Fuentes, L.D. Wolfe. 2002. Primates Face to Face: The Conservation Implications of Human-nonhuman Primate Interconnections. Cambridge: Cambridge University Press. ISBN 978-0-521-79109-0
- P. Dolhinow, A. Fuentes. 1999. The Nonhuman Primates. New York: McGraw-Hill. ISBN 978-1-55934-974-1

=== Articles ===
- Fuentes, A.; Kalchik, S.; Gettler, L.; Kwiatt, A.; Konecki, M.; Jones-Engel, L. (2008). "Characterizing Human–Macaque Interactions in Singapore". American Journal of Primatology. 70 (9): 879–883. doi:10.1002/ajp.20575. PMC 4447320. PMID 18521871.
- Cohn, DL; Smith, V; Pizarro, M; Jones-Engel, L; Engel, G; Fuentes, A; Shaw, E; Cortes, J (2007). "Pediculosis in Macaca sylvanus of Gibraltar". Vet Parasitol. 145: 116–9. doi:10.1016/j.vetpar.2006.12.008. PMC 1924910. PMID 17280788..
- Fuentes, A. (2006). "Human Culture and Monkey Behavior: Assessing the Contexts of Potential Pathogen Transmission between Macaques and Humans". American Journal of Primatology. 68 (9): 880–896. doi:10.1002/ajp.20295. PMID 16900502.
- Fuentes, A. (2004). "It's Not All Sex and Violence: Integrated Anthropology and the Role of Cooperation and Social Complexity in Human Evolution". American Anthropologist. 106 (4): 710–718. doi:10.1525/aa.2004.106.4.710. JSTOR 3567189.
- Fuentes, A. (2013). "Evolutionary Perspectives and Transdisciplinary Intersections. A Roadmap to Generative Areas of Overlap in Discussing the Human Nature". Theology and Science. 11 (2): 106–129. doi:10.1080/14746700.2013.780430.
