= Primate Conservation (journal) =

- Discipline: Conservation
- Language: English
- Edited by: Russell A. Mittermeier and Anthony B. Rylands

Publication details
- Former name: IUCN/SSC Primate Specialist Group Newsletter
- History: 1981–present
- Publisher: Conservation International, Margot Marsh Biodiversity Foundation, and Department of Anatomical Sciences of Stony Brook University on behalf of Primate Specialist Group
- Frequency: Annual (rolling)
- Open access: yes

Standard abbreviations
- ISO 4: Primate Conserv.

Indexing
- ISSN: 0898-6207

Links
- Journal homepage

Primate Conservation is a journal published by the IUCN Species Survival Commission's Primate Specialist Group about the world's primates. First published as a mimeographed newsletter in 1981, the journal today publishes conservation research and papers on primate species, particularly status surveys and studies on distribution and ecology. Besides these regular papers, the journal has also been a significant place for primatologists to publish descriptions of new primate species in Primate Conservation.

== New primate species descriptions ==
From South America, this includes the Caquetá titi (Callicebus caquetensis) described in 2010 and the Madidi titi (Plecturocebus aureipalatii, Syn.: Callicebus aureipalatii). From the island of Madagascar, new lemur species scientifically described in the pages of the journal include the Montagne d'Ambre dwarf lemur or Andy Sabin's dwarf lemur (Cheirogaleus andysabini), the Ankarana dwarf lemur (Cheirogaleus shethi), and two new species of mouse lemurs (Microcebus).
