= American Society of Primatologists =

Scientific society

The American Society of Primatologists (ASP) is both an educational and scientific society which aims to promote both the discovery and exchange of information on non-human primates. The society is open to anybody who actively, or is more passively interested in primatology, or anyone who is interested in supporting this. The Society publishes a scientific journal, The American Journal of Primatology.
