= Primates (journal) =

- Discipline: Primatology
- Language: English
- Edited by: Masayuki Nakamichi

Publication details
- History: 1957-present
- Publisher: Springer
- Frequency: Bimonthly
- Open access: Hybrid
- Impact factor: 2.163 (2020)

Standard abbreviations
- ISO 4: Primates

Indexing
- CODEN: PRMTBU
- ISSN: 0032-8332 (print); 1610-7365 (web)
- LCCN: sf80001417
- OCLC no.: 51531954

Links
- Journal homepage; Online access; Online archive

Primates is a bimonthly peer-reviewed scientific journal of primatology, and an official journal of the Japan Monkey Center at Kyoto University. It publishes original papers that cover all aspects of the study of primates. It was the first scientific journal focused exclusively on primates and remains the oldest, longest-running international primatology journal in the world.

The journal publishes original research articles, reviews, news and perspectives, and book reviews. It was established in 1957 by Kinji Imanishi. Although the first volume contained both articles in Japanese or English, subsequent volumes were published in English, thanks to a grant from the Rockefeller Foundation. It is now published by Springer and the current editor-in-chief is Masayuki Nakamichi (Osaka University).

According to the Journal Citation Reports, the journal has a 2020 impact factor of 2.163.

== Abstracting and indexing ==
The journal is abstracted and indexed by

- Academic OneFile
- AGRICOLA
- Anthropological Literature
- Biological Abstracts
- BIOSIS
- CAB Abstracts
- CAB International
- ProQuest
- Current Contents/Agriculture, Biology & Environmental Sciences
- EMBASE
- GEOBASE
- GeoRef
- Global Health
- PsycINFO
- PubMed/MEDLINE
- Science Citation Index
- Scopus
- The Zoological Record
