= European Federation for Primatology =

European scientific society

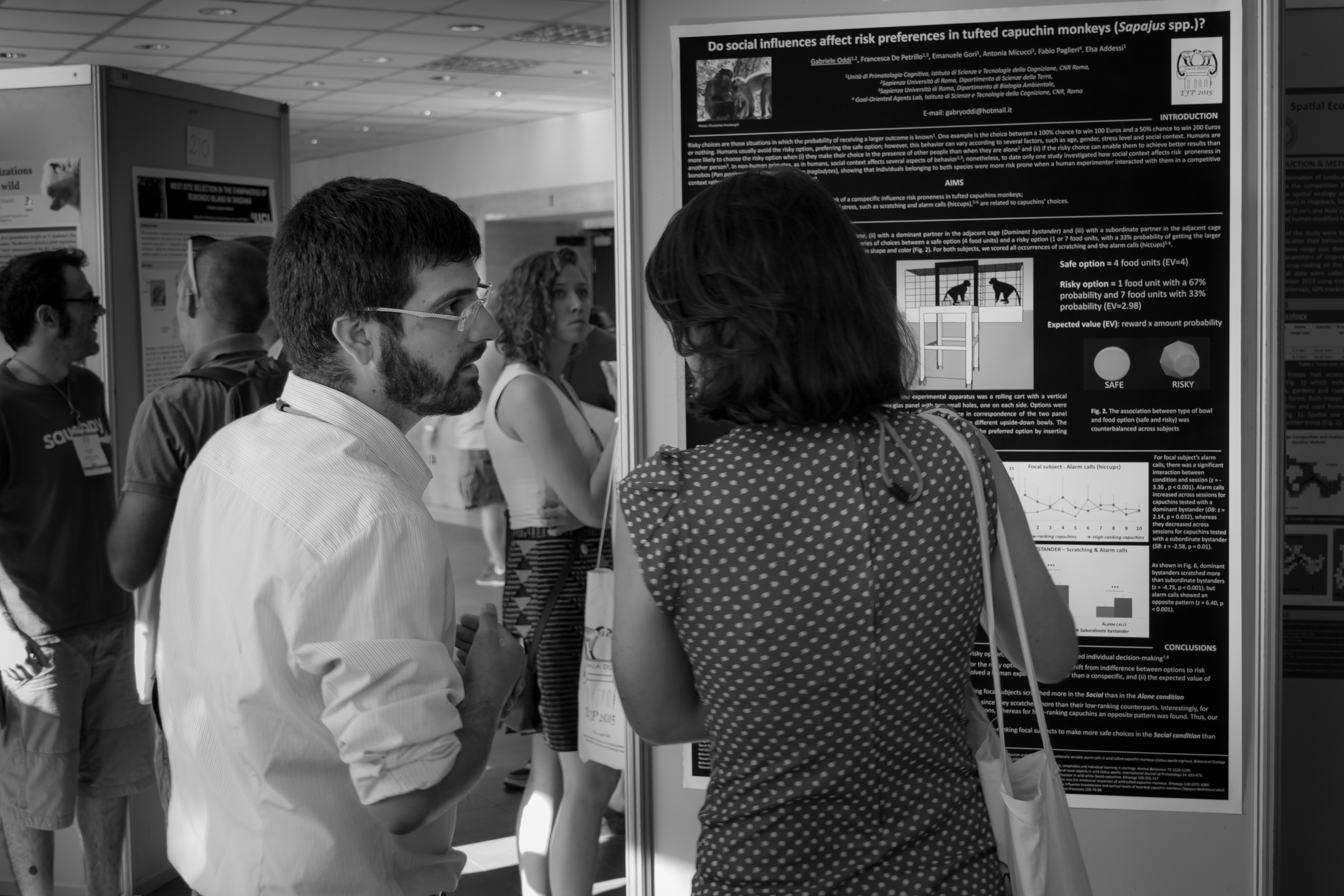
One of the research team of the Institute of Cognitive Sciences and Technologies in Rome (ISTC) discussing his paper at the European Federation for Primatology Meeting in Rome, 2015

The European Federation for Primatology (EFP) was founded on 17 December 1993. The seat of the Federation is Niederhausbergen (France).

The EFP brings together national primatological societies, as well as groups of primatologists in those countries of Europe where such societies are not yet founded.

The EFP members, who belong to societies or groups affiliated to the Federation, are involved in fundamental research, applied biomedical research and zoo management. This accounts for more than 1100 scientists, graduate students and zoo managers. More than 30 academic institutions are represented in the EFP through their membership. The colonies of primates which belong to these institutions account for about 2000 non-human primates.

== Purposes ==
The purpose of the Federation is:

- To coordinate actions related to primatology between the different European societies. Such coordination include:
  - Circulation of information between the different national primatological societies and groups of primatologists.
  - Meetings of the different national societies, specialist groups and other workshops.
  - Scientific activities, research and educational projects relevant to primatology.
- To promote rational management of captive primates and to make primate subjects and study sites available to a maximum number of students and researchers.
- To provide the Council of Europe and other European institutions with experts on all issues related to primatology.
- To participate, through the Council of Europe, in decisions relevant to primate trade and primate captive breeding.
- To promote the establishment of national societies of primatologists, national groups and European specialist groups of primatologists.

The aims of all affiliated societies or groups are identical to those of the International Primatological Society, IPS:

- To encourage all areas of non-human primatological scientific research.
- To facilitate cooperation among scientists of all nationalities engaged in primate research.
- To promote the conservation of all primate species.

Protection of captive primates, i.e. the improvement of their well-being, is one of the most important activities within EFP. Therefore, EFP promotes dialogue with all people involved in primatology and studies providing scientific evidence on primate welfare issues.

== Affiliated national groups and societies ==
- National societies:
  - 'Asociación Primatológica Española', Spanish Primatological Association (Spain).
  - 'Associazione Primatologica Italiana', Italian Primatological Association (Italy).
  - 'Associação Portuguesa de Primatologia', Portuguese Primatological Association (Portugal).
  - 'Gesellschaft für Primatologie', Society for Primatology (Germany).
  - Primate Society of Great Britain (United Kingdom).
  - 'Societé Francophone de Primatologie', Society Francophone of Primatology (France).
- Primatologists national groups:
  - Belgian Group for Primatology (Belgium).
  - Czech Republic Group of Primatologists (Czech Republic).
  - Netherland Contact Group for Primatology (Netherlands).
  - Russian Group of Primatologists (Russia).
  - Swiss Group of Primatologists (Swiss).

== Foreign relationships ==
The EFP is a member of IPS. The Secretary is nominated to the President of the IPS for appointment as the Regional Secretary for Europe of the la IPS.

== Publications ==
Folia Primatologica, Basel (Swiss), is the Federation's official publication.

== Meetings ==
The 'Asociación Primatológica Española' (APE) organised the first scientific meeting of EFP: European Workshop on Primate Research, Madrid (Spain), 16–19 October 1996, linked to own I APE Congress. After the meeting, according to the success of the local Organisation presided by Fernando Colmenares Gil, it was agreed that the next EFP congresses would be held similarly linked to other national ones.

The first EFP Congress took place with the IX German society Congress, Göttingen (Germany), August 9–12, 2005, was organising the 'Gesellschaft für Primatologie'.

Second EFP Congress, 3–7 September 2007, Charles University, Prague, Czech Republic

Third EFP Congress, 12–15 August 2009, Anthropological Institute, Zurich, Switzerland

Fourth EFP Congress, 14–17 September 2011, Almada, Portugal

Fifth EFP Congress, 10–13 September 2013, University of Antwerp, Belgium

Sixth EFP Congress, 25–28 August 2015, Roma Tre University, Italy

Seventh EFP Congress, 21–25 August 2017, University of Strasbourg, France

Eight EFP Congress, 8–11 September 2019, Oxford Brookes University and University of Oxford, United Kingdom
