= Richard Lynch Garner =

American primatologist (1848–1920)

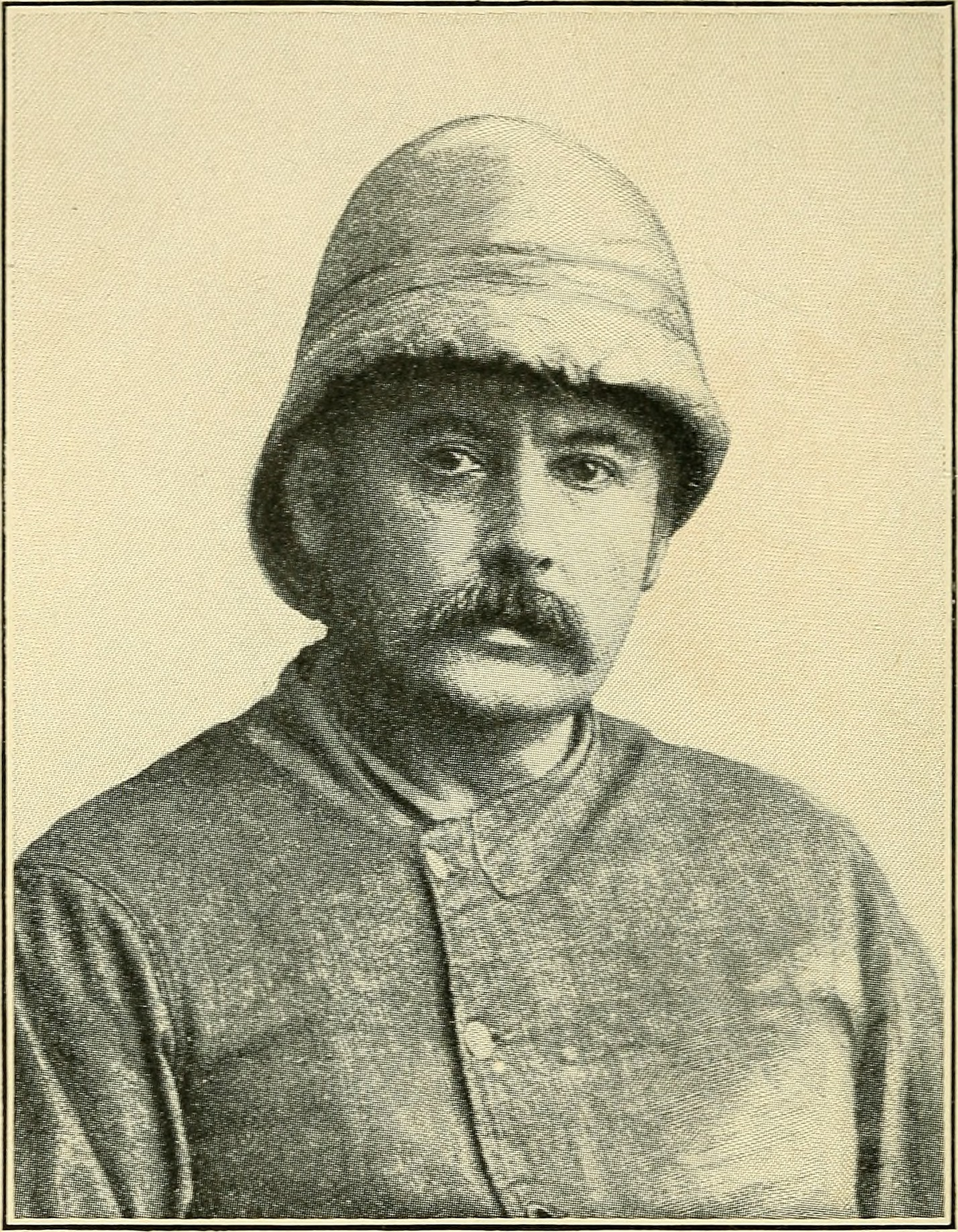
- Born: February 19, 1848; Abingdon, Virginia
- Died: January 22, 1920 (aged 71); Chattanooga, Tennessee
- Known for: Work with chimpanzees
- Spouse: Maggie E. Gross (m. 1872)
- Scientific career
- Fields: Primatology

Richard Lynch Garner (February 19, 1848 – January 22, 1920) was an American researcher who studied the vocalizations of nonhuman primates, especially chimpanzees. He pioneered the use of phonographs, a new technology at the time, to record and examine the speech of monkeys and apes. Though his work was controversial at the time, recent research has generally supported his views that animals communicate vocally with one another. His work and explorations into the evolution of human language inspired scientists such as Robert Yerkes and John Peabody Harrington.

== Education ==
Richard Lynch Garner was born in Abingdon, Virginia on February 19, 1848, the son of a businessman. He joined the Confederate Army at the age of 14, and during the Civil War was captured several times by Union soldiers. After the war, he attended the Jefferson Academy for Men in Tennessee for two years before becoming a schoolteacher, a vocation he pursued for over a decade.

He married Maggie E. Gross on October 15, 1872, and they had one son.

== Career ==
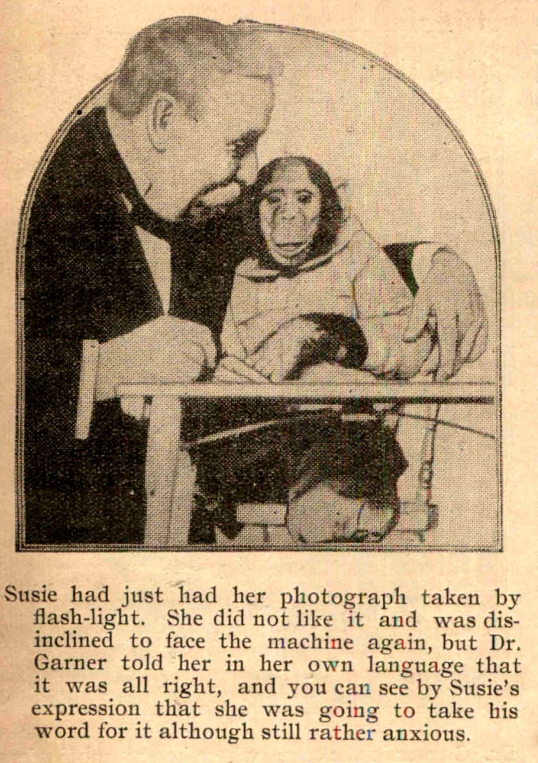

Garner's career studying primates arose through his interest in Charles Darwin and the theory of evolution. He hypothesized that human speech might have arisen from animal sounds and "resolved to study those sounds in a methodic manner and try to learn the speech of animals." He acquired one of Thomas Edison's early phonographs and began to spend time observing and recording monkeys at zoos in Cincinnati, Chicago, Washington, D.C., and elsewhere. He became famous for an 1891 article, "The Simian Tongue", in which he argued that the lower primates have a rudimentary language, and that this language is the origin of human speech.

In 1892 Garner went to Africa to study gorillas, then considered to be aggressive. He lived and observed from inside a cage; a few gorillas came near and none showed any aggression. Garner next raised funds for a trip to study chimpanzees in Gabon; among his donors were such prominent figures as Edison, Alexander Melville Bell, and Grover Cleveland. In Gabon, he attempted to decipher individual words of the chimpanzee language, and he also attempted to teach one chimpanzee a few words. He returned to Africa on several more research trips, some lasting more than a year. In 1910, he brought a chimpanzee named Susie back to the United States and toured with her, attempting to demonstrate that she knew a hundred English words.

Garner published three books on the subject of speech in primates, as well as articles in various magazines. Though his work was initially embraced by natural historians and other academics, his claims of animal "speech" were hugely controversial. Many of his contemporaries argued that language is what separated humans from animals and opposed any theories that could blur that boundary. But Garner expressed a discern for popular opinion, arguing that:

A knowledge of [monkey] language cannot injure man, and may conduce to the good of others, because it would lesson man's selfishness, widen his mercy, and restrain his cruelty.

Garner was hospitalized with Bright's disease in Chattanooga, Tennessee, and died several days later, on January 22, 1920.

== Publications ==
- The Speech of Monkeys (1892)
- Gorillas & Chimpanzees (1896)
- Apes and Monkeys: Their Life and Language (1900)
- Autobiography of a Boy: From the Letters of Richard Lynch Garner (1930; posthumous)

== Legacy ==
Early on, publications that did not reject evolutionary theory outright tended to accept Garner's various claims about chimpanzees — that he could communicate with them in their language, that he had taught them English words, that within a few generations they would be entirely literate — but in later years more skeptical and even satirical articles began to appear. Little of Garner's work has held up to scientific scrutiny, both because of his inflated claims and because he was a notoriously sloppy researcher who made many plainly incorrect statements about chimpanzee behavior (such as his assertion that their gestation period is 3 months when it is closer to 8 months). At the same time, he was ahead of his time in his pioneering use of recording devices for capturing field data and for use in playback-based experiments. And while he himself was not able to make a sound case for his intuitions about monkey speech, it has since been proven that monkeys do communicate vocally, and that those raised in captivity can learn a vocabulary of a few hundred human words. As the primatologist Robert Yerkes later wrote: "The writer humbly confesses that the more he learns about the great apes and lesser primates by direct observation as contrasted with reading, the more facts and valuable suggestions he discovers in Garner's writings."

The ethnologist John Peabody Harrington considered Garner an inspiration and wrote a brief biography of Garner entitled He Spoke. Harrington also helped get Garner's papers and slides donated to the Smithsonian Institution.

More recently, historian Jeremy Rich has called attention to Garner's white supremacism and efforts to popularize biological racism. Rich's book Missing Links: The African and American Worlds of R. L. Garner, Primate Collector (2012) describes, for example, Garner's arguments that chimpanzees were more loving than Africans, and that colonialism constituted a threat to the separation of the races.
