= Peter Marler =

British-American biologist (1928–2014)

- Born: February 24, 1928; Slough, England
- Died: July 5, 2014 (aged 86); Davis, California
- Education: University College London (PhD); University of Cambridge
- Awards: ForMemRS (2008); Guggenheim Fellow (1964)
- Scientific career
- Workplaces: University of California, Davis
- Theses: A preliminary study of the post-glacial history of the Esthwaite Valley (1952); Studies on the behaviour of the chaffinch (1955)

Peter Robert Marler ForMemRS (February 24, 1928 – July 5, 2014) was a British-born American ethologist and zoosemiotician known for his research on animal sign communication and the science of bird song. A 1964 Guggenheim Fellow, he was emeritus professor of neurobiology, physiology and ethology at the University of California, Davis.

== Education ==
Born in Slough, England, Marler graduated from University College London with a BSc in 1948, and a Ph.D. in botany in 1952. In 1954, he graduated from the University of Cambridge with a second Ph.D. in zoology.

== Career ==
From 1954 to 1956, he worked as a research assistant to William Homan Thorpe and Robert Hinde at Jesus College, Cambridge. In 1957, he became a professor at the University of California, Berkeley. In 1966, he became a professor at Rockefeller University, in 1969 became director of the Institute for Research in Animal Behavior, a collaboration between the New York Zoological Society (now the Wildlife Conservation Society) and Rockefeller University and in 1972 became director of the Field Research Center for Ethology and Ecology.

In 1989, Marler became a professor at the University of California, Davis. He retired in 1994, but took over the management of the local Center for Animal Behavior from 1996 to 2000. He died on July 5, 2014, of pneumonia while his family was evacuated from his Winters home because of the nearby Monticello wildfire.

== Research ==
Marler was an internationally recognized researcher in the field of bird song. Through his work with songbirds, he helped gain fundamental insights into the acquisition of song. He also studied the development of communication skills in several primate species: chimpanzees and gorillas, along with Jane Goodall and Hugo van Lawick, and the southern green monkey, in collaboration with Tom Struhsaker, Dorothy Cheney and Robert Seyfarth. Peter Marler developed the first properly semiotic approach to animal communication. His work greatly informed our understanding of memory, learning, and the importance of auditory and social experience. His work group included many well-known ornithologist and behavioral scientists, including Masakazu Konishi, Fernando Nottebohm, Susan Peters, Don Kroodsma, Christopher Clark, Bill Searcy, Steve Nowicki, Ken Yasukawa, and John Wingfield.

== Awards and honours ==
Marler was elected to the American Academy of Arts and Sciences in 1970, the United States National Academy of Sciences in 1971, and the American Philosophical Society in 1983. Marler was elected a Foreign Member of the Royal Society (ForMemRS) in 2008. His nomination reads:

Peter Marler is an extraordinarily distinguished behavioural biologist. He and his many graduate students, post doctoral workers and colleagues have played a central role in elucidating mechanisms of development of behaviour and the brain. In particular, Marler is known for his work on the development of bird song, showing the subtle interactions between environmental influences and an individual's predispositions. This work has had a far reaching impact on studies of development in behaviour, linguistics, and psychology. Marler's outstanding contributions have been recognized by many prizes, memberships of acaedemies and other awards.

== Selected publications ==
- Palleroni, A., M. Hauser & P. Marler (2005). "Do responses of galliform birds vary adaptively with predator size?" Animal Cognition. (8): 200–210.
- Partan, S.R.; P. Marler (2005) "Issues in the classification of multimodal communication signals". American Naturalist. (166): 231–245.
- Palleroni, A., C.T. Miller, M. Hauser, & P. Marler (2005). "Prey plumage adaptation against falcon attack". Nature. (434): 973–974.
- Nelson, D.A. & P. Marler (2005). "Do bird nestmates learn the same songs?" Animal Behaviour. (69): 1007–1010.
- Marler, P. (2005). "Ethology and the origins of behavioral endocrinology". Hormones and Behavior. (47): 493–502.
- Marler, P. (2004). "Science and birdsong: The good old days". In: Nature's Music: The Science of Birdsong, P. Marler & H. Slabbekoorn (eds.). Elsevier Academic Press, San Diego, CA, pp. 1–38.
- Marler, P. (2000). "Origins of music and speech: insights from animals". In: The Origins of Music, N. Wallin, B. Merker, and S. Brown (eds.). Cambridge: The MIT Press, 31–48.
- Marler P. (1999). "How much does a human environment humanize a chimp". American Anthropologist. (101): 432–436.
- Marler P. and DF Sherry (1999). "The nature and nurture of developmental plasticity". Proceedings of the 22nd International Ornithological Congress. Durban South Africa: University of Natal Press.
- Marler, P. (1978). Affective and symbolic meaning: Some zoosemiotic speculations. In Thomas A. Sebeok (ed.): Sight, Sound and Sense. Bloomington: Indiana University Press, 113–123.
- Marler, P (1970). "Birdsong and speech development: could there be parallels?". American Scientist. 58 (6): 669–673. JSTOR 27829317. PMID 5480089.
