= Dorothy Cheney (scientist) =

American primatologist

- Born: Dorothy Leavitt Cheney; August 24, 1950; Boston, Massachusetts, US
- Died: November 9, 2018 (aged 68); Devon, Pennsylvania, US
- Occupation: Primatologist
- Spouse: Robert Seyfarth

Academic background
- Education: Wellesley College
- Alma mater: Cambridge University
- Doctoral advisor: Robert Hinde

Academic work
- Discipline: Biology
- Sub-discipline: Primatology
- Institutions: University of Pennsylvania

Dorothy Leavitt Cheney (August 24, 1950 – November 9, 2018) was an American scientist who studied the social behavior, communication, and cognition of wild primates in their natural habitat. She was professor of biology at the University of Pennsylvania and a member of both the US National Academy of Sciences and the American Academy of Arts and Sciences.

== Background and education ==
Dorothy Leavitt Cheney was born August 24, 1950, in Boston, Massachusetts. Her father was an economist and U.S. Foreign Service officer. From 1964 to 1968 she attended Abbot Academy. In 1972 she graduated from Wellesley College, where she majored in Political Science and was a Durant Scholar. She married Robert Seyfarth in 1971 and in 1972 they initiated a joint research project on wild baboons in the Mt. Zebra National Park, South Africa. Following this field research, she became a doctoral student under the supervision of Robert Hinde, at Cambridge University. She received her PhD in 1977. Cheney died of breast cancer on November 9, 2018, at her home in Devon, Pennsylvania.

== Career ==
After Cambridge, Cheney (along with her husband) joined the laboratory of Peter Marler at Rockefeller University, where she held a National Science Foundation post-doctoral fellowship and later became an assistant professor. In 1981, Cheney and Seyfarth became assistant professors in the Department of Anthropology at UCLA. In 1985 they moved to the University of Pennsylvania, where Cheney was a member of the Anthropology Department from 1985 to 1991 and the Biology Department from 1991 until her retirement in 2016.

Cheney was elected Fellow of the Center for Advanced Study in the Behavioral Sciences (1983), the John Simon Guggenheim Foundation (1995), the Animal Behavior Society (1997), the American Academy of Arts & Sciences (1999), and was elected member of the U.S. National Academy of Sciences in 2015. The Proceedings of the National Academy of Sciences awarded its 2010 Cozzarelli Prize, for the best article in the area of Behavioral and Social Sciences, to a paper about baboon collaboration coauthored by Cheney and Seyfarth.

Cheney received a Biology Department teaching award (2009), the Distinguished Animal Behaviorist Award from the Animal Behavior Society (2016), the Distinguished Primatologist Award from the American Society of Primatologists (2016), an honorary doctorate from the University of Neuchâtel, Switzerland (2013), and the Distinguished Alumni Award from Phillips Andover Academy (2017).

== Research ==
In 1973 and 1974, Cheney and Seyfarth studied the social behavior of baboons in the Mt. Zebra National Park, South Africa. Cheney's research focused on the development of juveniles and subadults of both sexes. In 1977, as post-doctoral fellows working with Peter Marler, they began an 11-year study of behavior, communication, and cognition among vervet monkeys in Amboseli National Park, Kenya. They developed field "playback" experiments to study the information that listeners acquire when they hear a vocalization – particularly vervet monkey alarm calls – and showed how such experiments can be used to test hypotheses about the monkeys' knowledge of each other's social relationships. Their work is described in the book How Monkeys See the World (Cheney & Seyfarth 1990, University of Chicago Press).

Between 1985 and 1992, working jointly with their post-doctoral colleague Michael Owren, Cheney and Seyfarth carried out cross-fostering experiments on rhesus and Japanese macaques at the California National Primate Research Center (UC Davis). They tested whether infant and juvenile primates can modify their use of vocalizations depending on the social environment. Results revealed striking differences in the development of call production (largely fixed), usage of calls in the appropriate context (more flexible), and responses to the calls of others (highly modifiable).

Starting in 1992, Cheney and Seyfarth carried out a 16-year study of communication and social behavior among baboons in the Okavango Delta of Botswana. There, they and their colleagues continued their experimental studies of social cognition, showing that monkeys have a sophisticated understanding of each other's dominance ranks and social relationships. They also used non-invasive techniques to study the factors that contribute to stress and its alleviation under natural conditions. This work is described in their book Baboon Metaphysics (Cheney & Seyfarth, 2007, University of Chicago Press). Since 2005, research conducted jointly with Joan Silk has shown that, as in humans, individuals who establish close, stable bonds with others experience increased fitness in the form of greater longevity and offspring survival. Individuals with close social bonds also experience reduced stress levels. These results suggest that natural selection has favored individuals who have both the skill and the motivation to form strategic social bonds, and that the evolutionary antecedents of human cooperation can be found even in species without language or culture.

== Selected publications ==
- Cheney, D.L. 1978. Interactions of immature male and female baboons with adult females. Animal Behaviour 26, 389–408.
- Seyfarth, R.M., Cheney, D.L. & Marler, P. 1980. Monkey responses to three different alarm calls: Evidence for predator classification and semantic communication. Science 210, 801–803.
- Cheney, D.L. & Seyfarth, R.M. 1990. How Monkeys See the World. Chicago: University of Chicago Press. ISBN 9780226102467.
- Owren, M.J., Dieter, J.A., Seyfarth, R.M. & Cheney, D.L. 1993. Vocalizations of rhesus (Macaca mulatta) and Japanese (Macaca fuscata) macaques cross-fostered between species show evidence of only limited modification. Developmental Psychobiology 26, 389–406.
- Cheney, D.L. & Seyfarth, R.M. 1999.Recognition of other individuals' social relationships by female baboons. Animal Behaviour 58, 67–75.
- Cheney, D.L. & Seyfarth, R.M. 2007. Baboon Metaphysics. Chicago: University of Chicago Press. ISBN 9780226102443
- Engh, A.E., Beehner, J.C., Bergman, T.J., Whitten, P.L., Hoffmeier, R.R., Seyfarth, R.M. & Cheney, D.L. 2006. Behavioural and hormonal responses to predation in female chacma baboons (Papio hamadryas ursinus). Proceedings of the Royal Society of London, Series B. 273, 707–712.
- Silk, J.B., Beehner, J.C., Bergman, T.J., Crockford, C., Engh, A.L., Moscovice, L.R., Wittig, R.M., Seyfarth, R.M. & Cheney, D.L. 2009. The benefits of social capital: Close social bonds among female baboons enhance offspring survival. Proceedings of the Royal Society of London, Series B. 276, 3099–3104.
- Cheney, D.L., Moscovice, R., Heesen, M., Mundry, R. & Seyfarth, R.M. 2010. Contingent cooperation in wild female baboons. Proceedings of the National Academy of Sciences 107, 9562–9566.
- Cheney, D.L., Silk, J.B., & Seyfarth, R.M. 2012. Evidence for intrasexual selection in wild female baboons. Animal Behaviour 84, 21–27.
- Platt, M.L., Seyfarth, R.M., & Cheney, D.L. 2016. Adaptations for social cognition in the primate brain. Philosophical Transactions of the Royal Society 371, 20150096.
- Silk, J.B., Seyfarth, R.M. & Cheney, D.L. 2016. Strategic use of affiliative vocalizations by wild female baboons. PLoS One 11: e0163978.

== See also ==
- Animal communication
- Ethology
- Primate cognition
- Primate social systems
