= Dayu Lin =

Chinese neuroscientist

- Born: Shanghai, China
- Education: Fudan University, Duke University, California Institute of Technology
- Known for: Neural circuits underlying aggression
- Awards: 2013 McKnight Scholar Award, 2012 Alfred P. Sloan Fellow, 2006 Capranica Prize in Neuroethology
- Scientific career
- Fields: Neuroscience
- Workplaces: New York University Grossman School of Medicine

Dayu Lin is a neuroscientist and Professor of Psychiatry, Neuroscience and Physiology at the New York University Grossman School of Medicine in New York City. Lin discovered the neural circuits in the hypothalamus that give rise to aggression in mice. Her lab at NYU now probes the neural circuits underlying innate social behaviors, with a focus on aggressive and defensive behaviors.

== Early life and education ==
Lin was born in Shanghai, China. She pursued her undergraduate degree in biology at Fudan University in 1997 and studied Alzheimer's Disease for her undergraduate research project.

After graduating with a Bachelor's of Science in Biological Science in 2001, Lin pursued her graduate education in neurobiology at Duke University in North Carolina. Lin studied under the mentorship of Lawrence Katz, exploring the neural processes underlying olfaction. Since olfaction is critical in perceiving the social environment, Lin explored how the olfactory bulb represents complex mixtures of social olfactory stimuli. Using electrophysiological recordings and by fractionation of the volatile compound in mouse urine, she found that populations of mitral cells are activated to single volatile compounds. Specifically, she found one component of male urine, (methylthio)methanethiol (MTMT), which enhances the attractiveness of urine to female mice and that one third of mitral cells are responsive to this olfactant. Lin then conducted an analysis of the responses of olfactory glomeruli to single stimuli and she found that each individual volatile component of a complex olfactant activated one or very few glomeruli. This finding showed that the sum of responses to individual olfactory stimuli present within a complex olfactory stimulus gives rise to the neural representation of a complex smell.

After completing her graduate work in 2005, Lin moved to California to conduct her postdoctoral work at the California Institute of Technology (Caltech). Lin worked under the mentorship of David Anderson exploring the neural circuits underlying innate social behaviors, specifically aggression, in mouse models. In the Anderson Lab, Lin discovered the role of the ventromedial hypothalamus in driving aggressive behavior. She found that optogenetically stimulating the ventrolateral subdivision of the ventromedial hypothalamus causes male mice to attack both male and female mice as well as inanimate objects. She also found that pharmacologically silencing these neurons prevented aggression and using in vivo electrophysiological recording she determined that these neurons are inhibited during mating. Lin completed her postdoctoral work in 2010.

== Career and research ==
In 2010, Lin began her faculty position at the New York University Langone Medical Center where she holds titles as a Professor of Psychiatry and a Professor of Neuroscience and Physiology. Lin's lab explores the neural circuit mechanisms driving innate social behaviors in mice, with a specific focus on aggression and defensive behavior. Lin's seminal work discovering the role of the ventrolateral part of the ventromedial hypothalamus (VMHvl) in driving aggressive behavior lays the foundation for most of her lab's research program. They use genetic tools and in vivo recordings to dissect the many other brain regions within the VMHvl network, they explore the similarities and differences in female versus male neural mechanisms of aggression, and they probe the specific neuropeptides and neurotransmitters that mediate communication in these circuits.

=== Hypothalamic neural circuits underlying aggression ===
After discovering the role of the VMHvl in aggression, Lin and her team wanted to explore the neural computations that give rise to aggressive behavior. They found a population of neurons that were specifically activated in response to male investigation, male attack as well as distance from the male aggressor and animal velocity during attack. Through linear regression, Lin and her team found that the VMHvl is capable of encoding environmental stimuli that are important is driving and maintaining aggression in mice ushc as movement, sensory information, and motivation.

Lin and her team then explored the neural mechanisms of voluntary attack. They found that the VMHvl is essential for aggression-seeking behavior, such that optogenetic inhibition of this area decreased aggression-seeking while activation increased aggression-seeking and intensified future attack. Performing population optical recording and in vivo electrophysiology allowed them to see that the VMHvl neurons track learned aggression-seeking behavior as well as extinction of this behavior. Lin's team then found that a specific circuit, the VMHvl to the lateral periaqueductal grey (lPAG) projection, played a role in transforming the motivational and sensorimotor signals from the VMHvl into aggressive behavioral outputs. Since the neural signals in these downstream VMHvl projectors were time locked to jaw muscle movement, Lin and her team proposed that the lPAG neural activity represents a simplifies VMHvl code that drives aggression-related actions.

=== Defence behavior ===
Since Lin had previously found that VMH activation had led to defensive behavior in some of her mice in her postdoctoral work, she pursued an understanding of which VMH neurons encode or drive defensive behavior. She found that the estrogen receptor α expressing cells were excited during defence. When these cells were inhibited optogenetically, it prevented effective defensive behavior in animals that were being attacked. Through further activity dependent investigation, they found that the anterior VMHvl cells were specifically activated due to defence behavior compared to aggression, suggesting that these cells act as a neural substrate for conspecific defence.

== Awards and honors ==
- 2016 Irma T. Hirschi Career Scientist Award - New York University
- 2013 McKnight Scholar Award
- 2012 Janett Rosenberg Trubatch Career Development Award
- 2012 Alfred P. Sloan Fellow
- 2011 Klingenstein Neuroscience Fellow
- 2006 Capranica Prize in Neuroethology

== Select publications ==
- Hierarchical Representations Of Aggression In A Hypothalamic-Midbrain Circuit. Falkner, Annegret L; Wei, Dongyu; Song, Anjeli; Watsek, Li W; Chen, Irene; Chen, Patricia; Feng, James E; Lin, Dayu. Neuron. 2020 Mar 06;
- Hypothalamic Control Of Conspecific Self-Defense. Wang, Li; Talwar, Vaishali; Osakada, Takuya; Kuang, Amy; Guo, Zhichao; Yamaguchi, Takashi; Lin, Dayu. Cell Reports. 2019 Feb 12; 26(7):1747-1758.e5
- Sun F, Zeng J, Jing M, Zhou J, Feng J, Owen SF, Luo Y, Li F, Wang H, Yamaguchi T, Yong Z, Gao Y, Peng W, Wang L, Zhang S, ... ... Lin D, et al. 2019. A Genetically Encoded Fluorescent Sensor Enables Rapid and Specific Detection of Dopamine in Flies, Fish, and Mice. Cell. 174: 481–496.e19. PMID 30007419 DOI: 10.1016/j.cell.2018.06.042
- Hashikawa K, Hashikawa Y, Tremblay R, Zhang J, Feng JE, Sabol A, Piper WT, Lee H, Rudy B, Lin D. Esr1(+) cells in the ventromedial hypothalamus control female aggression. 2018. Nature Neuroscience. PMID 28920934 DOI: 10.1038/nn.4644
- Falkner AL, Grosenick L, Davidson TJ, Deisseroth K, Lin D. Hypothalamic control of male aggression-seeking behavior. 2016. Nature Neuroscience. PMID 26950005 DOI: 10.1038/nn.4264
- Wang L, Chen IZ, Lin D. Collateral pathways from the ventromedial hypothalamus mediate defensive behaviors. 2015. Neuron. 85: 1344–58. PMID 25754823 DOI: 10.1016/j.neuron.2014.12.025
- Falkner AL, Dollar P, Perona P, Anderson DJ, Lin D. Decoding ventromedial hypothalamic neural activity during male mouse aggression. 2014. The Journal of Neuroscience : the Official Journal of the Society For Neuroscience. 34: 5971–84. PMID 24760856 DOI: 10.1523/JNEUROSCI.5109-13.2014
- Lin D, Boyle MP, Dollar P, Lee H, Lein ES, Perona P, Anderson DJ. Functional identification of an aggression locus in the mouse hypothalamus. 2011. Nature. 470: 221–6. PMID 21307935 DOI: 10.1038/nature09736
- Lin da Y, Shea SD, Katz LC. Representation of natural stimuli in the rodent main olfactory bulb. 2006. Neuron. 50: 937–49. PMID 16772174 DOI: 10.1016/j.neuron.2006.03.021
- Lin DY, Zhang SZ, Block E, Katz LC. Encoding social signals in the mouse main olfactory bulb. 2005. Nature. 434: 470–7. PMID 15724148 DOI: 10.1038/nature03414
