= Lawrence Katz =

Lawrence Katz may refer to:

- Lawrence C. Katz (1956–2005), neurobiologist
- Lawrence F. Katz (born 1959), Harvard University economist
