= Owren =

Owren is a surname. Notable people with the surname include:

- Michael Owren (1955–2014), Norwegian-born American psychologist
- Sidsel Owren, Norwegian ski-orienteering competitor
- Trygve Owren (1912–1987), Norwegian politician

== See also ==
- Oren
- Owen (name)
