= Thelma Rowell =

British zoologist (1935–2025)

Thelma E. Rowell
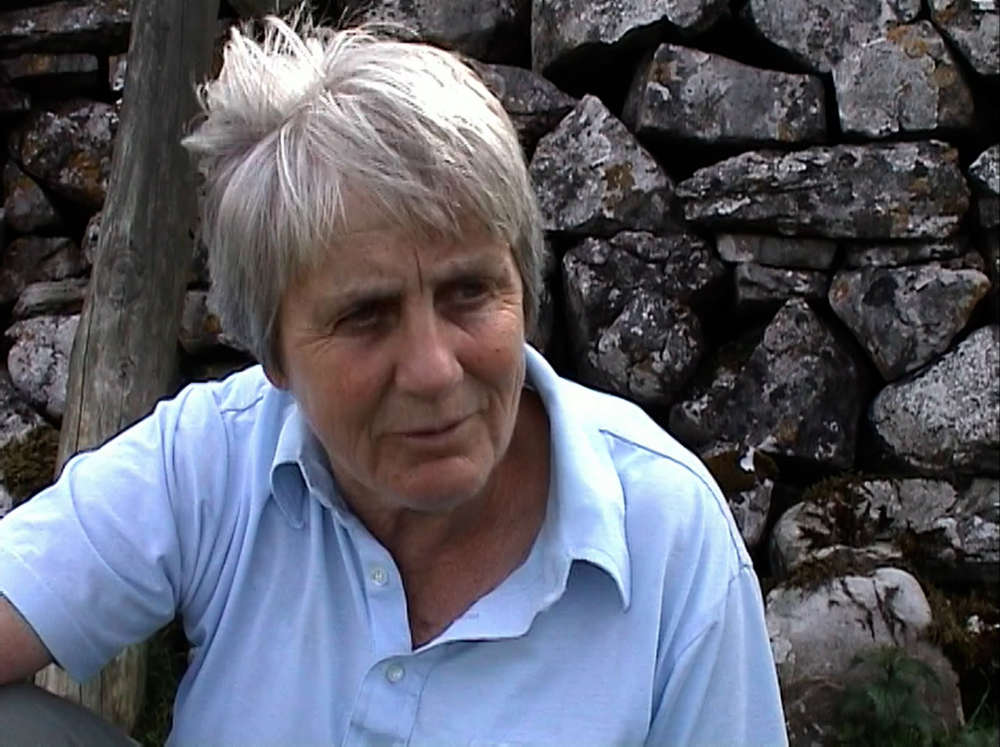
- A still from the documentary "Non Sheepish Sheep" by Didier Demorcy and Vincianne Despret 2005
- Born: 1935; Baildon, Yorkshire, England
- Died: 10 December 2024
- Education: Cambridge University
- Known for: Challenging established dogma in primatology
- Scientific career
- Fields: Zoology, Primatology
- Workplaces: University of California, Berkeley, University of Nairobi, Makerere University

Thelma Elizabeth Rowell (1935–2024) was a British biologist and zoologist known mostly for her work with monkeys and sheep. She was a professor of zoology at the University of California, Berkeley from 1974 to 1994.

Rowell was known for her field research on Olive baboons in Uganda. Her work challenged the then-prevailing assumptions about baboon society and the "army model" that centered the role of male aggression and hierarchy. She was a key thinker in pushing primatology toward abandoning the idea of a single "primate pattern," which purported to characterize social behaviors across different species and locations. Instead, throughout her career, she emphasized the complexity of animal behavior and the pitfalls of sweeping generalizations.

Among her peers in primatology, Rowell was known as an iconoclast who challenged anthropocentric assumptions about animal behavior. Her contemporaries coined the term "Thelma Effect" to refer to thinking that challenged dogma in their field. Rowell's work was widely appreciated by feminists, but she eschewed identifying or being seen as supporting any particular ideology.

== Biography ==
Thelma Elisabeth Giles was born in Yorkshire, England, in 1935. She attended Newnham College, Cambridge, as a zoology undergrad. She continued her studies at the University of Cambridge, studying hamsters for her dissertation and working in the lab of Robert Hinde. (Hinde later advised Jane Goodall, and credited Rowell, along with Goodall and Dian Fossey, with changing his perspective on his work.)

As part of this experimental work, Rowell temporarily removed mothers of rhesus macaque infants and tested their stress responses. She wrote up the findings and submitted them to the Zoological Society of London Journal under the name "T.E. Rowell." The paper was well-received, but when the journal invited its author down to London to give a talk, the realization that Rowell was a woman came as an unwelcome surprise. The Society told her that she would not be able to eat with the fellows due to her sex and needed to sit behind a curtain, out of sight, to eat her meal in private. Rowell declined and, in the words of a biographer, “shared a pork shop at a girlfriend’s flat instead.”

When her macaque study ended, Rowell found that she was unable to break Cambridge’s "old-boy network" and concluded she had no shot at a university position.) While at Cambridge, she had met Hugh Rowell, a fellow zoologist and grad student, and the two married at the Queens College chapel, each receiving their zoology doctorates on the same day in 1959. Hugh Rowell was offered a position as a university lecturer at Makerere University in Uganda, and the couple moved to Africa in 1962. Rowell decided to apply for a grant to conduct primate field research, an easier inroad to academic work for women at the time, and received a grant from the British government.

The focus of Rowell's research was to compare and contrast the behavior of wild and caged olive baboons. She began a six-year study in 1963 in a forested area of Queen Elizabeth Park, several hours away from Makerer University in Kampala. She traveled back and forth every two weeks, alternating between observing baboons in the field and studying caged baboons at the university.

=== Challenging the baboon model ===
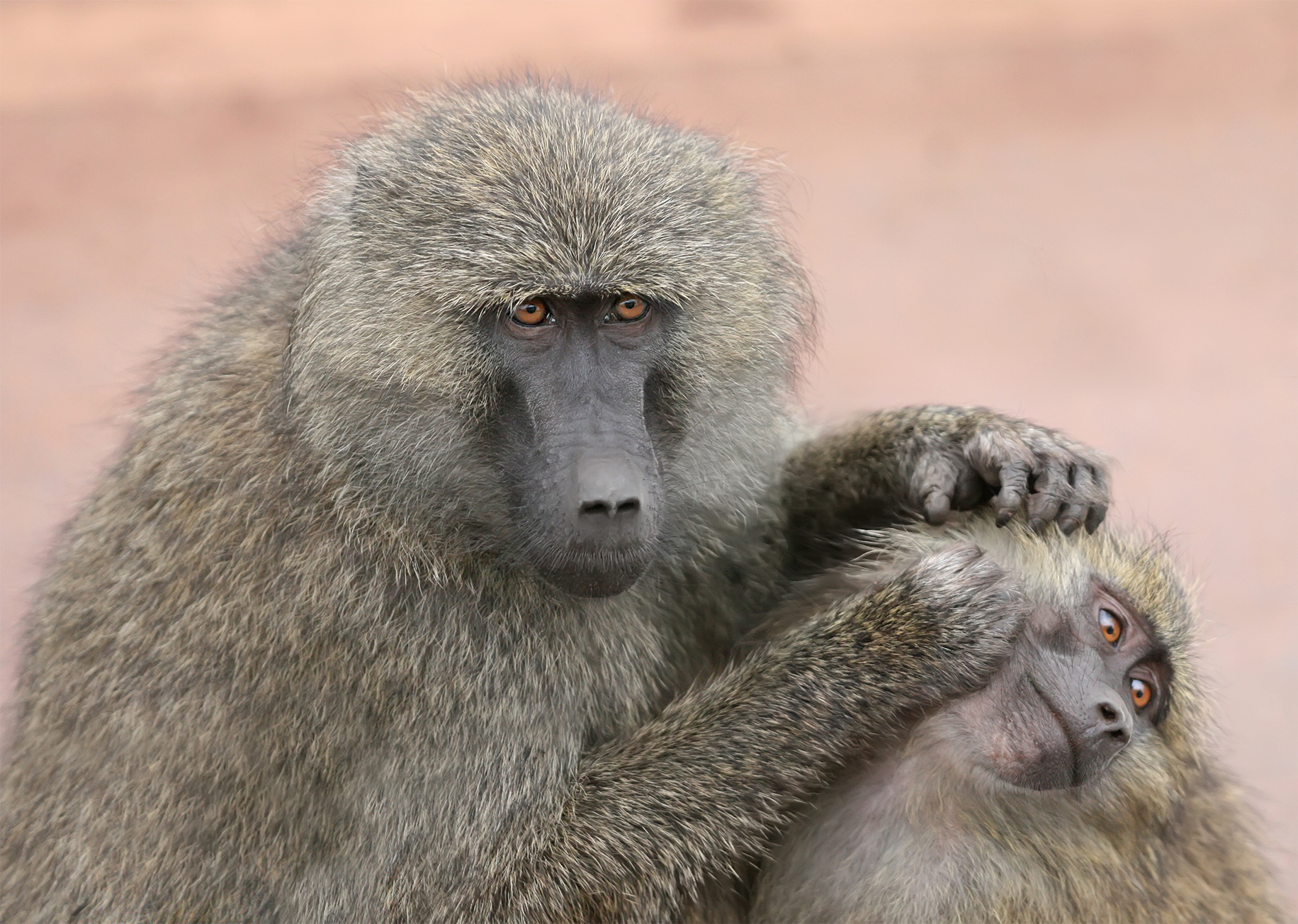
Rowell's early studies focused on olive baboons, particularly social behaviors such as grooming (seen here)

Baboons are unusual among monkeys in that they are largely terrestrial — most monkeys live in trees. Anthropologists viewed baboon social groupings as primitive models of human society. American anthropologists Sherwood Washburn and Irven DeVore had conducted early research on baboons, and, building on 1930s work by Solly Zuckerman, defined the outlines of baboon societies that Rowell had studied at Cambridge. Males were seen as constituting the core of social groupings, keeping others in line through aggression and a strict dominance hierarchy. Washburn viewed this portrait of baboon life as the "primate pattern," a model he believed varied little across contexts and species.

Rowell saw a different picture. Her baboon males were not very aggressive; in fact, fights were rare enough that she didn’t see any sign of a clear male hierarchy in the wild. Males tended to transfer in and out of her group, whereas the females stayed put. The females grouped themselves along kinship ties and determined the group’s feeding path for the day.

Rowell found the claims of an "army model" for baboon behavior puzzling. Males were said to lead groups and protect the females and infants from predators. But whenever she observed predators approaching, the males — rather than fighting them off — were the first to flee, leaving the females and infants behind as easy prey.

Rowell published her findings in the Journal of Zoology (1966). Wary of contradicting her predecessors, she suggested that the behavioral differences she observed may have something to do with her group's (unusual) forest habitat in Uganda. Previous baboon studies focused on savanna baboons — perhaps the environment explained the differences? She later came to regret this bit of "professional diplomacy," as it flowered into a myth about the "arcane forest baboon" that took years to undo.

Rowell's second paper about baboons, "A Quantitative Comparison of the Behaviour of a Wild and Caged Baboon Group" (1967), became a classic in ethology; it was selected for a 1996 Nature volume, Foundations of Animal Behavior, along with 33 other papers by scientists such as Charles Darwin, John B. Watson, and E.O. Wilson.

==== Social Behaviour of Monkeys ====
By the 1970s, Rowell had grown less concerned with contradicting colleagues and more assured in her own field research. Other scientists had documented primate groups that similarly diverged from the classic baboon model. Jeanne Altmann, Alison Jolly, Barbara Smuts, and Shirley Strum all challenged the notion that primates could be summed up with a simple pattern centering male aggression and hierarchy. Altmann’s influential survey of data collection methodology in 1974 drew widespread attention to human bias in observation methods and helped point toward paths for improvement.

In 1972, Penguin published Rowell’s book about her studies in Uganda, The Social Behaviour of Monkeys. The review in Science described it as a “very interesting and stimulating” book that “challenges some old ideas, presents some new theories, and effectively communicates the complexity of nonhuman primates and their social systems.”

“Somewhat to [Rowell’s] horror, the book became very popular among feminists in the 1970s and 1980s," wrote critic Donna Haraway (including herself among the feminist fans). As Haraway acknowledged, Rowell bemoaned any attempts to bend or misrepresent primate behavior to suit human political ends.

=== Career at Berkeley ===
In 1969, Rowell's husband was offered a faculty position at the University of California, Berkeley, and the family (now with two children) moved to California. At the time, university "anti-nepotism" rules restricting them from hiring multiple members of the same family were common; these rules made it very difficult for women to get tenure-track jobs in higher education. So, initially, Rowell's work at Berkeley was restricted to limited teaching roles; however, she continued to conduct research outside of the university, at the San Francisco Zoo. In the 1970s, with the influence of the Civils Rights movement, anti-nepotism policies ended and Rowell was appointed to the faculty at Berkeley in 1974. She established colonies of talapoin and patas monkeys there, and her team published several foundational papers about their social development and reproductive physiology.

From 1978 to 1981, Rowell taught at the University of Nairobi as part of Berkeley’s exchange program. She promoted the development of primate field studies in the Kakamega Forest, western Kenya. She also encouraged primate-oriented research by Kenyans, two of whom became her doctoral students.

Rowell disbanded the captive monkey colonies in Berkeley by the mid-1980s, in the face of increased government regulation and the rise of organized animal-rights protests. By this time, primatology had solidified into a field in its own right, with several dedicated journals and international conferences devoted to the discipline. Rowell found the singling out of primate study — and the assumption that primates are uniquely intelligent animals — problematic. To prove her point, she turned her attention to study some of the most maligned and "silly" mammals, sheep.

=== Sheep studies ===
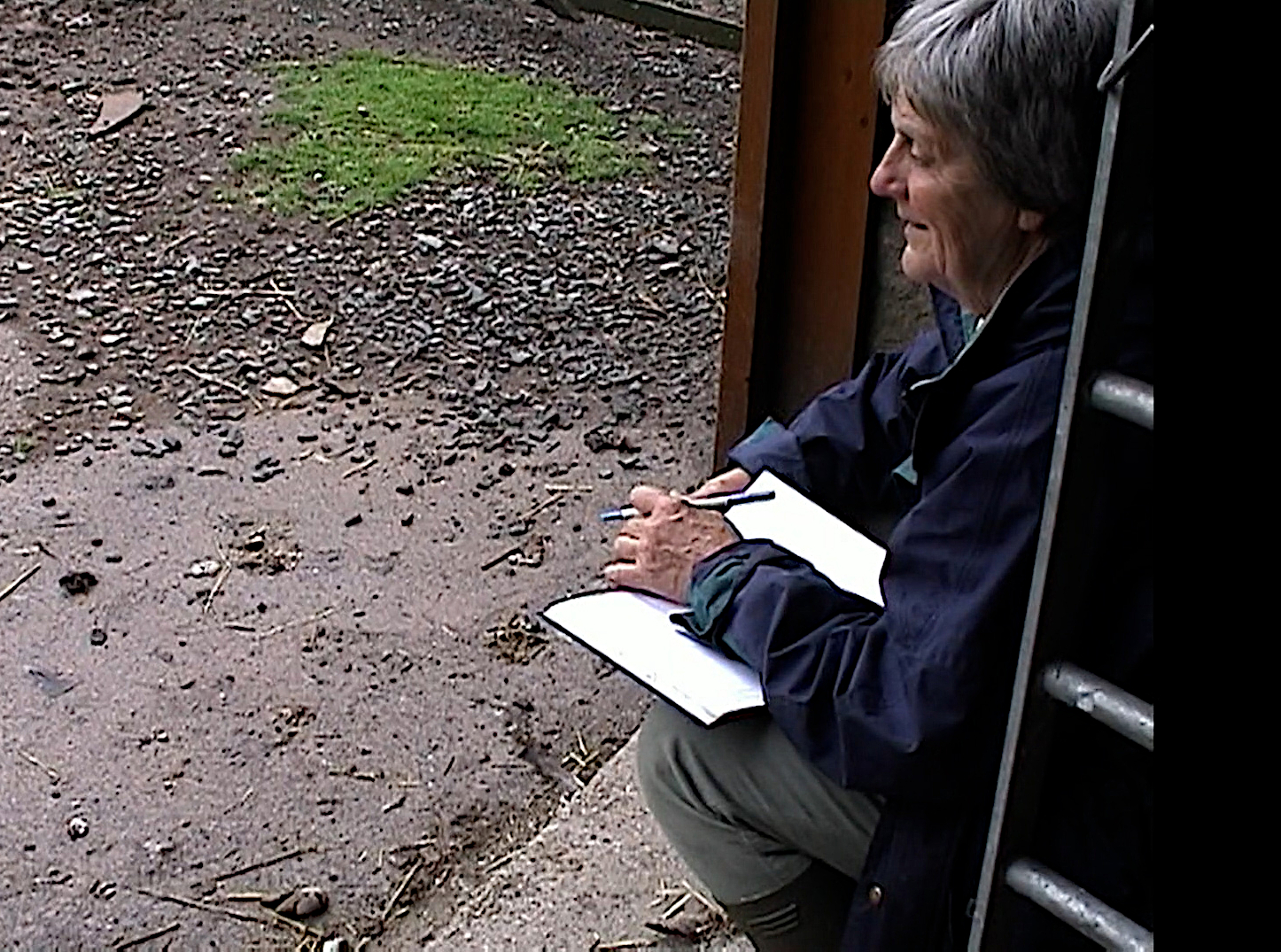
A still of Thelma Rowell from the video documentary "Non Sheepish Sheep" by Didier Demorcy and Vincianne Despret 2005

In the late 1980s, Rowell shifted to studying feral sheep in the Sierra Nevada foothills. At that time, the Machiavellian intelligence hypothesis was a hot topic in primatology, suggesting that primates were uniquely intelligent due to their complex social needs. Rowell challenged the underlying assumption that primates were "smarter" than other animals, pointing out that other mammals hadn't yet been studied with the same degree of care and intensity as humanity's closest relatives. Sheep, for example, were widely considered mindless, but Rowell found them to have complex communications and sociality. She argued that scientists had studied sheep (and other animals) for very limited commercial purposes, using husbandry practices that bred out natural traits and eliminated individual choice. The prevailing views of sheep behavior were based on scientific practices as methodologically flawed as those of the debunked early baboon studies.

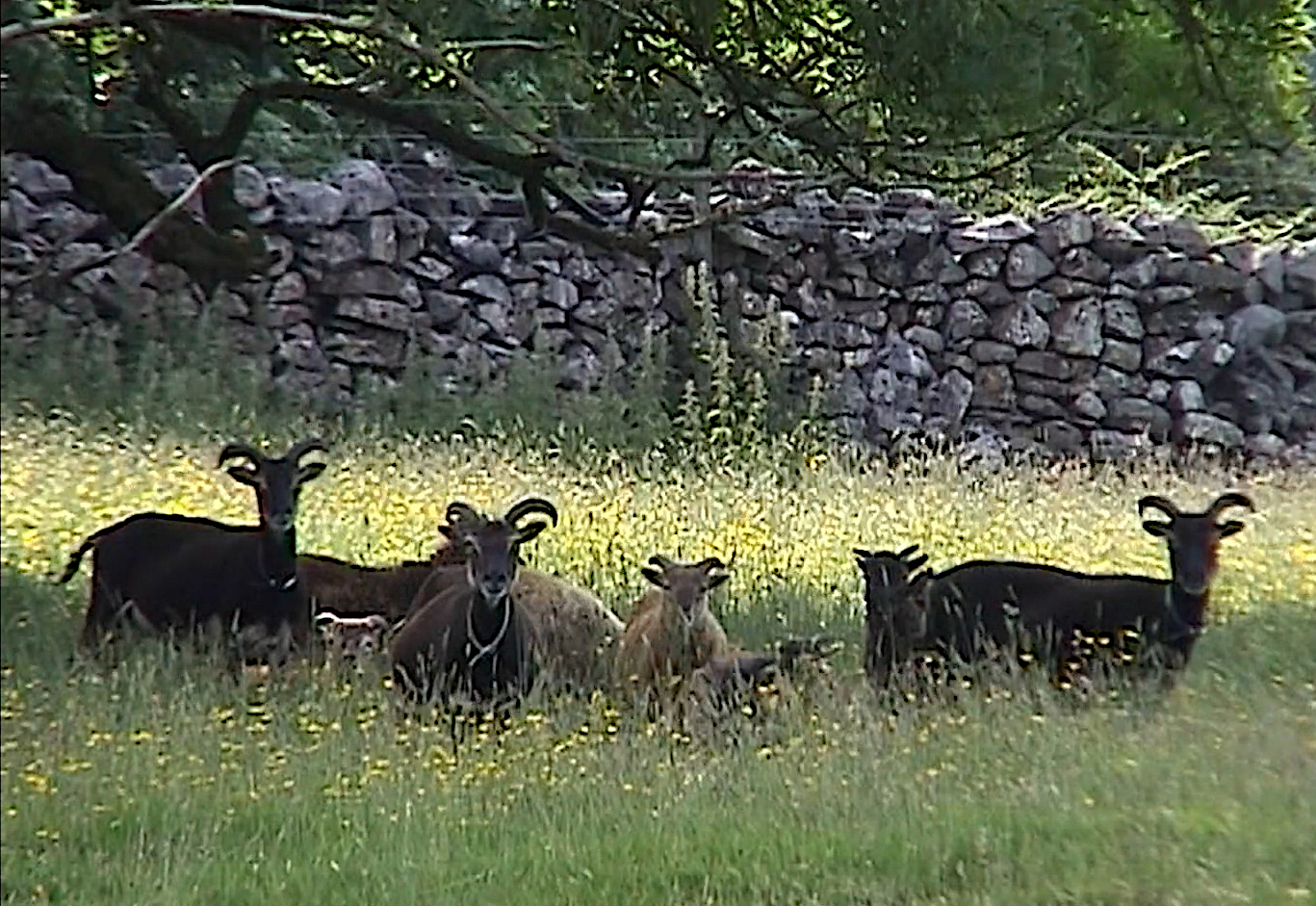
Rowell studied sheep on a family farm after retiring in Yorkshire. From the video documentary "Non Sheepish Sheep" by Didier Demorcy and Vincianne Despret 2005

Rowell had a difficult time finding a journal to publish her sheep research, as sheep research at the time was expected to focus on issues such as feed conversion rates — methods to improve agribusiness and boost profits. Her study, published in Ethology, found that sheep have a female hierarchy, conduct reconciliations, mutual grooming, and intervene in third-party fights, characteristics they shared with primates.

Rowell was not the first scientist to point out human bias in privileging the study of primates over other animals, but her views were nonetheless prescient in capturing what scholars later termed "primatocentricism" or "primate chauvinism."

=== Critique of primatology ===
After retiring from Berkeley in 1994 and moving back to Yorkshire, Rowell summarized her concerns about primatology in two key papers, both later published as book chapters. Identifying herself as a biologist, she wrote that walling off primates from other animal study has hampered scientific understanding. She pointed out that most primate studies focus on a mere 5% of primates: chimpanzees, baboons, and the more common macaques (rhesus, long-tailed, and Japanese). This well-studied minority is easier to watch than other primates and individuals interact noisily with each other: playing, fighting, reconciling, and grooming. Rowell asked: Why is it that the "squabbling species" devote so much time to social interactions than the other roughly 95% of primates? Could it be related to low levels of predation? If her sheep were as "preoccupied with intragroup squabbles" as baboons, they would become "instant mutton" — "wiped out by predators taking them by surprise."

Primatologists can't supply answers, argued Rowell, because they lump all primates together — as if one could expect "useful generalizations" about the social behavior of gorillas and tarsiers. The difference between the "squabbling" species and other primates is greater than that between other highly social animals (whales, dolphins, and elephants), but comparative data was practically non-existent, she argued. The taxonomic boundary was one problem and methodology was another. By the end of the 1990s, it was widely accepted that studying primates required identifying and intensely observing individuals within groups and studying both individuals and groups long-term. But this was not the case for other mammals, and Rowell joined with other biologists in calling for more comparative animal data.

== Selected Publications ==
- Rowell, T. E. (1961). The family group in golden hamsters: Its formation and break-up. Behaviour, 17(2-3), 81-94.
- Rowell, T. E., & Hinde, R. A. (1962, March). Vocal communication by the rhesus Mojsxey (Macaca mulatta). In Proceedings of the Zoological Society of London (Vol. 138, No. 2, pp. 279-294). Oxford, UK: Blackwell Publishing Ltd.
- Rowell, T. E. (1963). Behaviour and female reproductive cycles of rhesus macaques. Reproduction, 6(2), 193-203.
- Rowell, T. E., Hinde, R. A., & Spencer-Booth, Y. (1964). " Aunt"-Infant interaction in captive rhesus monkeys. Animal Behaviour.
- Rowell, T. E. (1966). Forest living baboons in Uganda. Journal of Zoology, 149(3), 344-364.
- Rowell, T. E. (1966). Hierarchy in the organization of a captive baboon group. Animal Behaviour.
- Rowell, T. E. (1971). Organization of caged groups of Cercopithecus monkeys. Animal Behaviour, 19(4), 625-645.
- Rowell, T. E. (1972). Female reproduction cycles and social behavior in primates. In Advances in the Study of Behavior (Vol. 4, pp. 69-105). Academic Press.
- Rowell, T. E. (1974). The concept of social dominance. Behavioral Biology, 11(2), 131-154.
- Rowell, T. E., & Olson, D. K. (1983). Alternative mechanisms of social organization in monkeys. Behaviour, 86(1-2), 31-54.
- Rowell, T. E. (1988). Beyond the one-male group. Behaviour, 104(3-4), 189-201.
- Rowell, T. E., & Mitchell, B. J. (1991). Comparison of seed dispersal by guenons in Kenya and capuchins in Panama. Journal of Tropical Ecology, 7(2), 269-274.
- Rowell, T. E. (1991). Till death us do part: long-lasting bonds between ewes and their daughters.
- Rowell, T. E., & Rowell, C. A. (1993). The social organization of feral Ovis aries ram groups in the pre‐rut period. Ethology, 95(3), 213-232.
- Rowell, Thelma. (1994.) On the Significance of the Concept of the Harem When Applied to Animals in Glendon Schubert and Roger D. Masters, editors, Primate Politics. Maryland: University Press of America.
- Rowell, Thelma (1999). The Myth of Peculiar Primates. In Box, Hilary O.; Gibson, Kathleen R. (eds.). Mammalian Social Learning: Comparative and Ecological Perspectives. Cambridge University Press.
- Rowell, Thelma (2000). A Few Peculiar Primates. In Strum, Shirley C.; Fedigan, Linda M. (eds.). Primate Encounters: Models of Science, Gender, and Society. Chicago and London: University of Chicago Press.
- Rowell, Thelma (2000). The Ethological Approach Precluded Recognition of Reconciliation in Filippo Aureli and Frans B.M. De Waal, editors, Natural Conflict Resolution, Berkeley: University of California Press.
