= Masakazu Konishi =

Japanese neurobiologist (1933–2020)

- Born: February 17, 1933; Kyoto, Empire of Japan (Now Japan)
- Died: July 23, 2020 (aged 87); San Diego, California, U.S.
- Education: Hokkaido University (B.S.); University of California, Berkeley (Ph.D.)
- Awards: International Prize for Biology (1990); Gruber Prize in Neuroscience (2005)
- Scientific career
- Fields: Biology, Ethology
- Workplaces: California Institute of Technology
- Thesis: The role of audition in the development and maintenance of avian vocal behavior (1963)
- Doctoral advisor: Peter Marler
- Doctoral students: Larry Katz

Masakazu "Mark" Konishi (小西 正一, Konishi Masakazu; February 17, 1933 – July 23, 2020) was a Japanese neurobiologist, known for his research on the neuroscience underlying the behavior of owls and songbirds.

== Early life and education ==
Konishi was born on February 17, 1933, in Kyoto, Japan, the only child of poor "Nishijin" weavers. As a child during the Second World War, he grew edible plants in his family's backyard and rooftop, and raised rabbits for food. In his spare time, he enjoyed playing with animals, including insects, fish, birds, rabbits, and dogs.

He first studied at Hokkaido University, where he completed his Bachelor of Science in 1956 and Master of Science in 1958. He had initially planned to study agriculture, but changed his mind upon seeing the zoology subjects on offer. Despite finding most of these zoology lectures "quite boring", his interest was piqued by the neurophysiology course taught by Mitsuo Tamashige. His master's research examined brood parasitism of reed warbler nests by cuckoos.

Konishi received a Fulbright travel scholarship to move to the United States for his doctoral research. In September 1958, he arrived at the University of California, Berkeley to undertake his PhD with Alden H. Miller, only to discover that Miller was on sabbatical in South America. Instead, he completed his PhD under ethologist Peter Marler, who had also recently arrived at the institution. Konishi's findings highlighted the important role of auditory feedback in songbird vocal learning, using white-crowned sparrows and other songbird species. His work, together with that of fellow PhD student Fernando Nottebohm, "laid the foundation for the discovery of the avian song control system by Nottebohm in the 1970s and the remarkable development of the field of birdsong neurobiology."

== Career ==
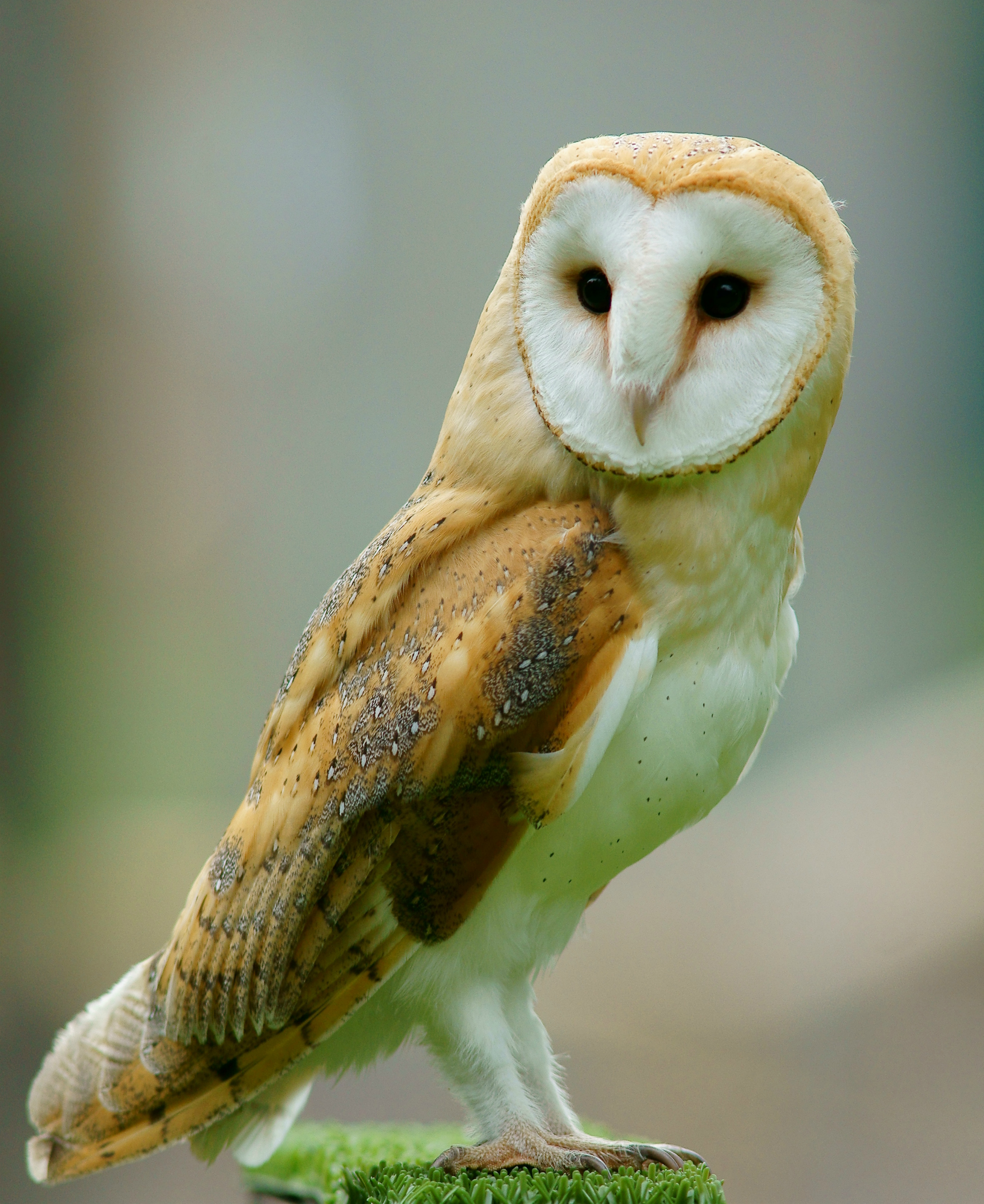
Konishi was noted for his research on hearing in barn owls.

Following his graduation in 1963, Konishi undertook two postdoctoral positions in Germany, at the University of Tübingen (1963–64) and in the Division of Experimental Neurophysiology at the Max-Planck Institute (1964–65). He then returned to the United States, working at the University of Wisconsin (1965–66) and later at Princeton University (1966–75). During this time, Konishi began research projects exploring owl and songbird behavior.

While based at Princeton, Konishi attempted to use neurophysiological methods to measure hearing in birds, by determining the threshold sensitivities of single neurons in the cochlear nuclei: all species tested could hear low frequencies, but species with high frequencies in their songs could also hear high frequencies. He also investigated the development of hearing in duck embryos. Konishi's research on owls began when he acquired three nestling barn owls from a local birdwatcher.

Konishi was a Professor of Biology at California Institute of Technology (Caltech) from 1975 to 1980, and served as Bing Professor from 1980 until his retirement in 2013. In the 1980s, he and his collaborators raised white-crowned sparrows in isolation, and demonstrated that these birds still preferred their own species' song over heterospecific songs from the same geographic area.

Konishi was a leader in the field of avian neuroethology and a foremost expert in avian auditory systems. Throughout his career, he advised dozens of graduate students and postdoctoral researchers. Among his Caltech students was Larry Katz, whom Konishi described as his "most adventurous and skillful" student. Katz introduced brain slice techniques into Konishi's lab. Work by students in the lab, including Katz, Mark Gurney and Jim McCasland, helped establish that neurons in the songbirds' HVC respond to sound and are selective for the bird's own song.

Konishi was a member of the American Academy of Arts and Sciences (1979) and the National Academy of Sciences (1985). He was a founding member of the International Society for Neuroethology, and served as the society's second President from 1986 to 1989.

== Personal life and death ==
In his spare time, Konishi enjoyed working with animals, writing "I have been lucky, because I did not have to go far from my hobby to my scientific subjects." In his later years, he began training border collies to herd sheep.

In 1990, Konishi received the International Prize for Biology, which was established to honor Hirohito, the Shōwa Emperor of Japan (1901–1989). When receiving the award, he met Akihito, son of Hirohito, and his wife Empress Michiko. Several years later, the imperial couple invited Konishi to dine at their palace. The couple did not say a word about the Japanese food he had chosen during the meal; nevertheless, Konishi found the Empress particularly "charming" and, later, sent her a reel of tape containing the song of European nightingales. She thanked him in a handwritten letter.

Konishi retired from his position at Caltech in 2013, and died of natural causes at his home in San Diego, California on July 23, 2020, at the age of 87.

== Awards ==
- F. O. Schmitt Prize (1987)
- International Prize for Biology (1990)
- Lewis S. Rosenstiel Award (2003, Brandeis University)
- Edward M. Scolnick Prize in Neuroscience (2004, MIT)
- Gerard Prize (2004, Society for Neuroscience)
- Karl Spencer Lashley Award (2004, American Philosophical Society)
- Gruber Prize in Neuroscience (2005, Society for Neuroscience)
