= Fernando Nottebohm =

Argentine neuroscientist

- Born: 1940 (age 85–86)
- Education: University of California, Berkeley (PhD)
- Scientific career
- Workplaces: Rockefeller University
- Thesis: The Role of Sensory Feedback in the Development of Avian Vocalizations (1966)
- Doctoral advisor: Peter Marler
- Website: lab.rockefeller.edu/nottebohm

Fernando Nottebohm (born 1940 in Buenos Aires) is a neuroscientist. He serves as the Dorothea L. Leonhardt Professor at Rockefeller University, as well as being head of the Laboratory of Animal Behavior and director of the Field Research Center for Ecology and Ethology.

== Education ==
Nottebohm was born in Argentina and received his PhD in zoology from the University of California, Berkeley in 1966 while working with Peter Marler. Afterwards, he conducted extensive investigations of the song of the rufous-collared sparrow (Zonotrichia capensis).

== Research ==
Nottebohm is best known for his work on neurogenesis in the adult vertebrate brain, a phenomenon that previously had been thought impossible by most scientists.

== Career ==
- 1967-71 Assistant professor, Rockefeller University
- 1971-76 Associate professor, Rockefeller University
- 1976–present Professor, Rockefeller University
- 1981–present Director, Rockefeller University Field Research Center for Ecology and Ethology, Millbrook, New York

== Honors and awards ==
- 1982 Fellow of the American Association for the Advancement of Science
- 1982 Fellow of the American Academy of Arts and Sciences.
- 1982 Kenneth Craik Research Award of St. John's College, Cambridge University, England, for outstanding scholarship in physiological psychology.
- 1984 Pattison Award for Distinguished Research in the Neurosciences.
- 1986 Nelson Medical Lectureship, awarded by the School of Medicine of the University of California, Davis
- 1986 Elliott Coue's Award, American Ornithologists’ Union.
- 1987 Painton Award, Cooper Ornithological Society.
- 1988 Member of the National Academy of Sciences. USA
- 1990 MERIT Award, National Institutes of Mental Health.
- 1991 Member of the American Philosophical Society.
- 1992 Charles A. Dana Award (jointly with Masakazu Konishi) for pioneering achievement in The Health Sciences.
- 1995 King Solomon Lecturer at Hebrew University of Jerusalem.
- 1996 Named to the Dorothea L. Leonhardt Distinguished Professorship, Rockefeller University
- 1999 Fondation Ipsen Neuronal Plasticity Prize (jointly with Peter Marler and Masakazu Konishi).
- 2003 Ernst Florey Plenary Lecture. 29th Göttingen Neurobiology Conference & 15th Meeting of German Neuroscience Society.
- 2003 Lewis S. Rosenstiel Award for Distinguished Work in the Basic Medical Sciences (shared with Masakazu Konishi and Peter Marler).
- 2004 Karl Spencer Lashley Award (shared with Masakazu Konishi). American Philosophical Society
- 2006 Benjamin Franklin Medal in Life Sciences. The Franklin Institute.
- 2006 Sven Berggren Lecture and Prize. Royal Physiographic Society in Lund.
