= Alarm signal (animal communication) =

Signal made by social animals to warn others of danger

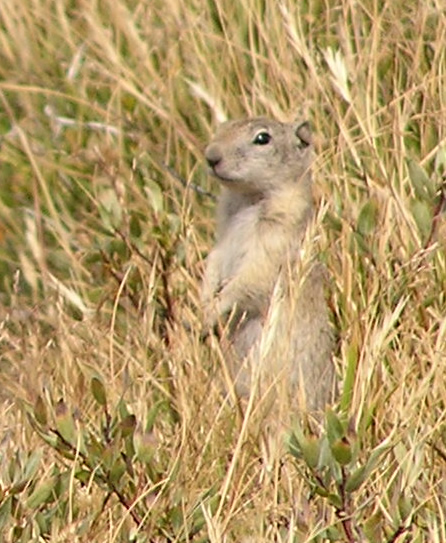
Alarm calls have been studied in many species, such as Belding's ground squirrels.

Characteristic 'ticking' alarm call of a European robin, Erithacus rubecula

In animal communication, an alarm signal is an antipredator adaptation in the form of signals emitted by social animals in response to danger. Many primates and birds have elaborate alarm calls for warning conspecifics of approaching predators. For example, the alarm call of the blackbird is a familiar sound in many gardens. Other animals, like fish and insects, may use non-auditory signals, such as chemical messages. Visual signs such as the white tail flashes of many deer have been suggested as alarm signals; they are less likely to be received by conspecifics, so have tended to be treated as a signal to the predator instead.

Different calls may be used for predators on the ground or from the air. Often, the animals can tell which member of the group is making the call, so that they can disregard those of little reliability.

Evidently, alarm signals promote survival by allowing the receivers of the alarm to escape from the source of peril; this can evolve by kin selection, assuming the receivers are related to the signaller. However, alarm calls can increase individual fitness, for example by informing the predator it has been detected.

Alarm calls are often high-frequency sounds because these sounds are harder to localize.

== Selective advantage ==
Alarm call by a rock squirrel

This cost/benefit tradeoff of alarm calling behaviour has sparked many interest debates among evolutionary biologists seeking to explain the occurrence of such apparently "self-sacrificing" behaviour. The central question is this: "If the ultimate purpose of any animal behaviour is to maximize the chances that an organism's own genes are passed on, with maximum fruitfulness, to future generations, why would an individual deliberately risk destroying itself (their entire genome) for the sake of saving others (other genomes)?".

=== Altruism ===
Some scientists have used the evidence of alarm-calling behaviour to challenge the theory that "evolution works only/primarily at the level of the gene and of the gene's 'interest' in passing itself along to future generations." If alarm-calling is truly an example of altruism, then human understanding of natural selection becomes more complicated than simply "survival of the fittest gene".

Other researchers, generally those who support the selfish gene theory, question the authenticity of this "altruistic" behaviour. For instance, it has been observed that vervets sometimes emit calls in the presence of a predator, and sometimes do not. Studies show that these vervets may call more often when they are surrounded by their own offspring and by other relatives who share many of their genes. Other researchers have shown that some forms of alarm calling, for example, "aerial predator whistles" produced by Belding's ground squirrels, do not increase the chances that a caller will get eaten by a predator; the alarm call is advantageous to both caller and recipient by frightening and warding off the predator.

=== Predator-directed signaling ===
Another theory suggests that alarm signals function to attract further predators, which fight over the prey organism, giving it a better chance of escape. Others still suggest they are a deterrent to predators, communicating the prey's alertness to the predator. One such case is the western swamphen (Porphyrio porphyrio), which gives conspicuous visual tail flicks (see also aposematism, handicap principle and stotting).

==== Further research ====
Considerable research effort continues to be directed toward the purpose and ramifications of alarm-calling behaviour, because, to the extent that this research has the ability to comment on the occurrence or non-occurrence of altruistic behaviour, these findings can be applied to the understanding of altruism in human behaviour.

== Monkeys with alarm calls ==
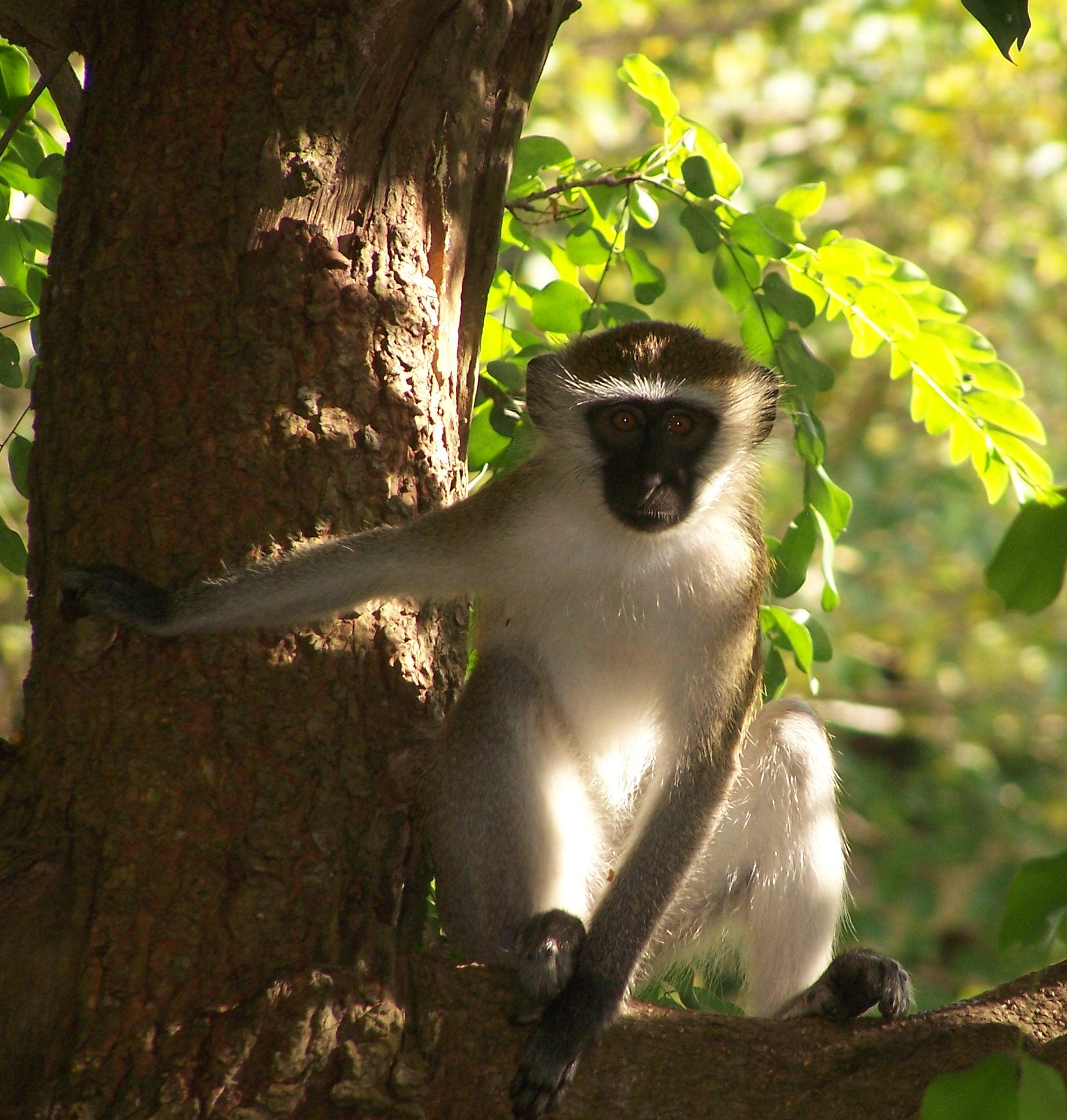
Vervet monkey in Dar es Salaam, Tanzania

=== Vervet monkeys ===
Vervet monkeys (Chlorocebus Pygerythus) are some of the most studied monkeys when it comes to vocalization and alarm calls within the nonhuman primates. They are most known for making alarm calls in the presence of their most common predators (leopards, eagles, and snakes). Alarm calls of the vervet monkey are considered arbitrary in relation to the predator that they signify, in the sense that while the calls may be distinct to the threat that the monkeys are perceiving, the calls do not mimic the actual sounds of the predator – it is like yelling "Danger!" when seeing an angry dog rather than making barking sounds. This type of alarm calls is seen as the earliest example of symbolic communication (the relationship between signifier and signified is arbitrary and purely conventional) in nonhuman primates.

However, there is much debate on whether the vervet monkeys alarm calls are actual "words" in the sense of purposely manipulating sounds to communicate specific meaning or are unintentional sounds that are made when interacting with an outside stimulus. Like small children who cannot communicate words effectively make random noises when being played with or are stimulated by something in their immediate environment. As children grow and begin learning how to communicate, the noises they make are very broad in relation to their environment. They begin to recognize the things in their environment but there more things than known words or noises so a certain sound may reference multiple things. As children get older, they can become more specific about the noises and words made in relation to the things in their environment. It is thought that as vervet monkeys get older they are able to learn and break the broad categories into more specific sub categories to a specific context.

An experiment conducted by Tabitha Price used custom software to gather the acoustic sounds of male and female vervet monkeys from East Africa and male vervet monkeys from South Africa. The point of the experiment was to gather the acoustic sounds of these monkeys when stimulated by the presence of snakes (mainly pythons), raptors, terrestrial animals (mostly leopards), and aggression. Then to determine if the calls could be distinguished with a known context.

The researchers concluded that while the vervet monkeys were able to categorize different predators and members of different social groups, however their ability to communicate specific threats is not proven. The chirps and barks that vervet monkeys make as an eagle swoops in are the same chirps and barks that are made in moments of high arousal. Similarly, the barks made for leopards are the same that are made during aggressive interactions. The environment that they exist in is too complex for their ability to communicate about everything in their environment specifically.

In an experiment conducted by Julia Fischer, a drone was flown over vervet monkeys and recorded the sounds produced. The vervet monkeys made alarm calls that were almost identical to the eagle calls of East African vervets. When a sound recording of the drone was played back a few days later to a monkey that was alone and away from the main group it looked up and scanned the sky. Fischer concluded that vervet monkeys can be exposed to a new threat once and understand what it means.

It is still debated whether or not vervet monkeys are actually aware of what the alarm calls mean. One side of the argument is that the monkeys give alarm calls because they are simply excited. The other side of the argument is that the alarm calls create mental representation of predators in the listeners minds. The common middle ground argument is that they give alarm calls because they want others to elicit a certain response, not necessarily because they want the group to think that there is a specific threat near.

Ultimately there is not enough evidence to support whether or not the calls are simply identifying a threat or calling for specific action due to the threat.

=== Campbell's mona monkeys ===
Campbell's mona monkeys also generate alarm calls, but in a different way than vervet monkeys. Instead of having discrete calls for each predator, Campbell monkeys have two distinct types of calls which contain different calls which consist in an acoustic continuum of affixes which change meaning. It has been suggested that this is a homology to human morphology. Similarly, the cotton-top tamarin is able to use a limited vocal range of alarm calls to distinguish between aerial and land predators. Both the Campbell monkey and the cotton-top tamarin have demonstrated abilities similar to vervet monkeys' ability to distinguish likely direction of predation and appropriate responses.

That these three species use vocalizations to warn others of danger has been called by some proof of proto-language in primates. However, there is some evidence that this behavior does not refer to the predators themselves but to threat, distinguishing calls from words.

=== Barbary macaque ===
Another species that exhibits alarm calls is the Barbary macaque. Barbary macaque mothers are able to recognize their own offspring's calls and behave accordingly.

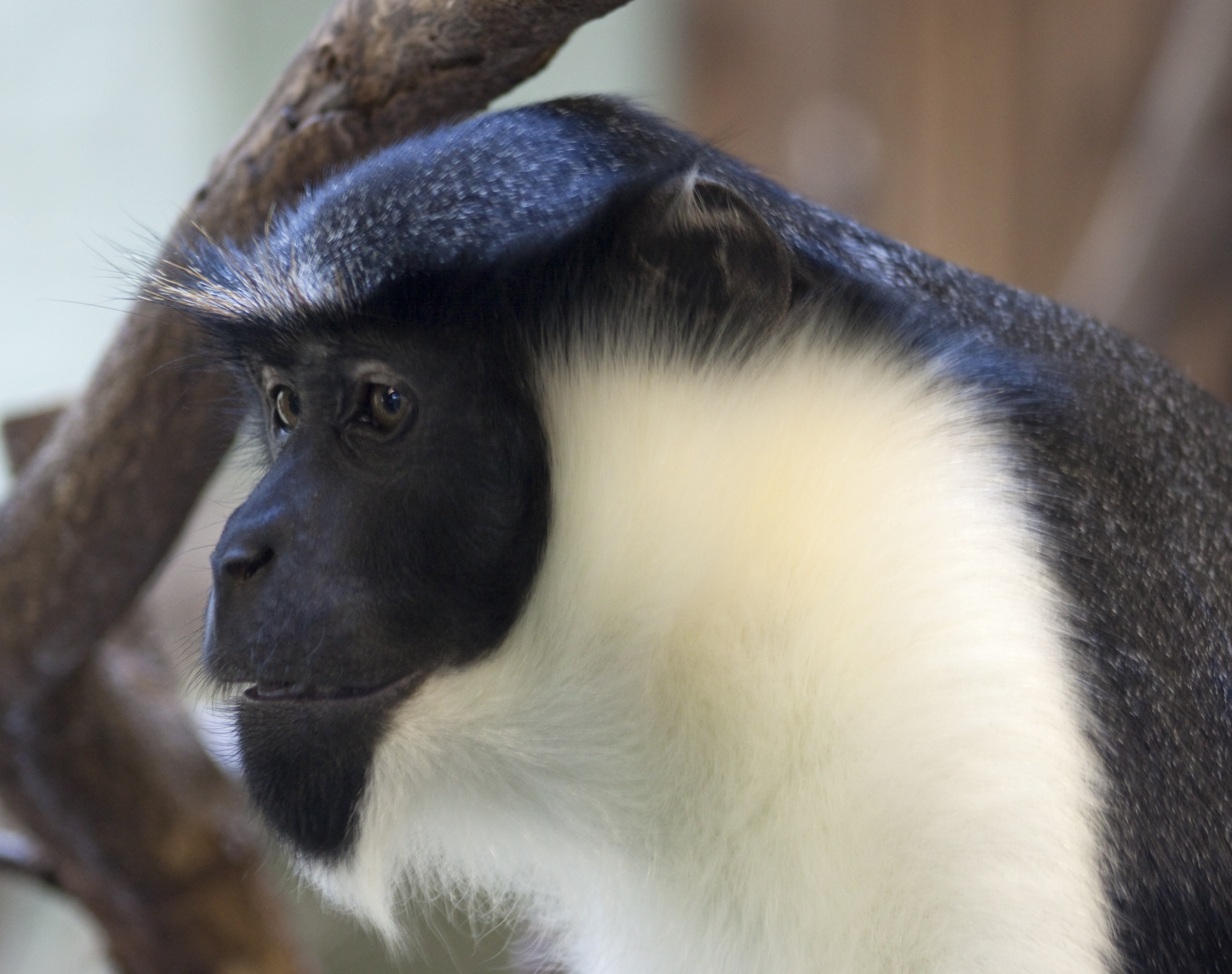
Diana monkeys produce alarm calls that differ based on caller, threat type, and habitat.

=== Diana monkeys ===
Diana monkeys also produce alarm signals. Adult males respond to each other's calls, showing that calling can be contagious. Their calls differ based on signaller sex, threat type, habitat, and caller ontogenetic or lifetime predator experience.

Diana monkeys emit different alarm calls as a result of their sex. Male alarm calls are primarily used for resource defence, male–male competition, and communication between groups of conspecifics. Female alarm calls are mainly used for communication within groups of conspecifics to avoid predation.

Alarm calls are also predator-specific. In Taï National Park, Côte d'Ivoire, Diana monkeys are preyed on by leopards, eagles, and chimpanzees, but only emit alarm calls for leopards and eagles. When threatened by chimpanzees, they use silent, cryptic behaviour and when threatened by leopards or eagles, they emit predator-specific alarm signals. When researchers play recordings of alarm calls produced by chimpanzees in response to predation by leopards, about fifty per cent of nearby Diana monkeys switch from a chimpanzee antipredator response to a leopard antipredator response. The tendency to switch responses is especially prominent among Diana monkey populations that live within the main range of the chimpanzee community. This shift in antipredator response suggests that the monkeys interpret chimpanzee-produced, leopard-induced alarm calls as evidence for the presence of a leopard. When the same monkeys are then played recordings of leopard growls, their reactions confirm that they had anticipated the presence of a leopard. There are three possible cognitive mechanisms explaining how Diana monkeys recognize chimpanzee-produced, leopard-induced alarm calls as evidence for a nearby leopard: associative learning, causal reasoning, or a specialized learning programme driven by adaptive antipredator behaviour necessary for survival.

In Taï National Park and Tiwai Island, Sierra Leone, specific acoustic markers in the alarm calls of Diana monkeys convey both threat type and caller familiarity information to a receiver. In Taï National Park, males respond to eagle alarm signals based on predator type and caller familiarity. When the caller is unfamiliar to the receiver, the response call is a 'standard' eagle alarm call, characterized by a lack of frequency transition at the onset of the call. When the caller is familiar, the response call is an atypical eagle alarm call, characterized by a frequency transition at onset, and the response is faster than to that of an unfamiliar caller. On Tiwai Island, males respond in the opposite way to eagle alarm signals. When the caller is familiar, the response call is a 'standard' eagle alarm call, without a frequency transition at onset. When the caller is unfamiliar, the response call is an atypical eagle alarm call, with a frequency transition at onset.

The differences in alarm call responses are due to differences in habitat. In Taï National Park, there is a low predation risk from eagles, high primate abundance, strong intergroup competition, and a tendency for group encounters to result in high levels of aggression. Therefore, even familiar males are a threat to whom males respond with aggression and an atypical eagle alarm call. Only unfamiliar males, who are likely to be solitary and non-threatening, do not receive an aggressive response and receive only a typical alarm call. On Tiwai Island, there is a high predation risk from eagles, low primate abundance, a tendency for group encounters to result in peaceful retreats, low resource competition, and frequent sharing of foraging areas. Therefore, there is a lack of aggression towards familiar conspecifics to whom receivers respond with a 'standard' eagle call. There is only aggression towards unfamiliar conspecifics, to whom receivers respond with an atypical call. Simply put, a response with a typical eagle alarm call prioritizes the risk of predation, while a response with an atypical alarm call prioritizes social aggression.

Diana monkeys also display a predisposition for flexibility in acoustic variation of alarm call assembly related to caller ontogenetic or lifetime predator experience. In Taï National Park and on Tiwai Island, monkeys have a predisposition to threat-specific alarm signals. In Taï National Park, males produce three threat-specific calls in response to three threats: eagles, leopards, and general disturbances. On Tiwai Island, males produce two threat-specific calls in response to two groups of threats: eagles, and leopards or general disturbances. The latter are likely grouped together because leopards have not been present on the island for at least 30 years.

Other primates, such as Guereza monkeys and putty-nosed monkeys, also have two main predator-specific assemblies of alarm calls. Predator-specific alarm signals differ based on call sequence assembly. General disturbances in Taï National Park and both general disturbances and leopards on Tiwai Island result in alarm calls assembled into long sequences. Conversely, leopards in Taï National Park result in alarm calls that typically begin with voiced inhalations followed by a small number of calls. These differences in alarm call arrangement between habitats are due to ontogenetic experience; specifically, a lack of experience with leopards on Tiwai Island causes them to be classified in the same predator category as general disturbances, and accordingly, leopards receive the same type of alarm call arrangement.

=== Sexual selection for predator-specific alarm signals ===
In guenons, selection is responsible for the evolution of predator-specific alarm calls from loud calls. Loud calls travel long distances, greater than that of the home range, and can be used as beneficial alarm calls to warn conspecifics or showcase their awareness of and deter a predator. A spectrogram of a subadult male call shows that the call is a composition of elements from a female alarm call and male loud call, suggesting the transition from the latter to the former during puberty and suggesting that alarm calls gave rise to loud calls through sexual selection. Evidence of sexual selection in loud calls includes structural adaptations for long-range communication, co-incidence of loud calls and sexual maturity, and sexual dimorphism in loud calls.

=== Controversy over the semantic properties of alarm calls ===
Not all scholars of animal communication accept the interpretation of alarm signals in monkeys as having semantic properties or transmitting "information". Prominent spokespersons for this opposing view are Michael Owren and Drew Rendall, whose work on this topic has been widely cited and debated. The alternative to the semantic interpretation of monkey alarm signals as suggested in the cited works is that animal communication is primarily a matter of influence rather than information, and that vocal alarm signals are essentially emotional expressions influencing the animals that hear them. In this view monkeys do not designate predators by naming them, but may react with different degrees of vocal alarm depending on the nature of the predator and its nearness on detection, as well as by producing different types of vocalization under the influence of the monkey's state and movement during the different types of escape required by different predators. Other monkeys may learn to use these emotional cues along with the escape behaviour of the alarm signaller to help make a good decision about the best escape route for themselves, without there having been any naming of predators.

== Chimpanzees with alarm calls ==
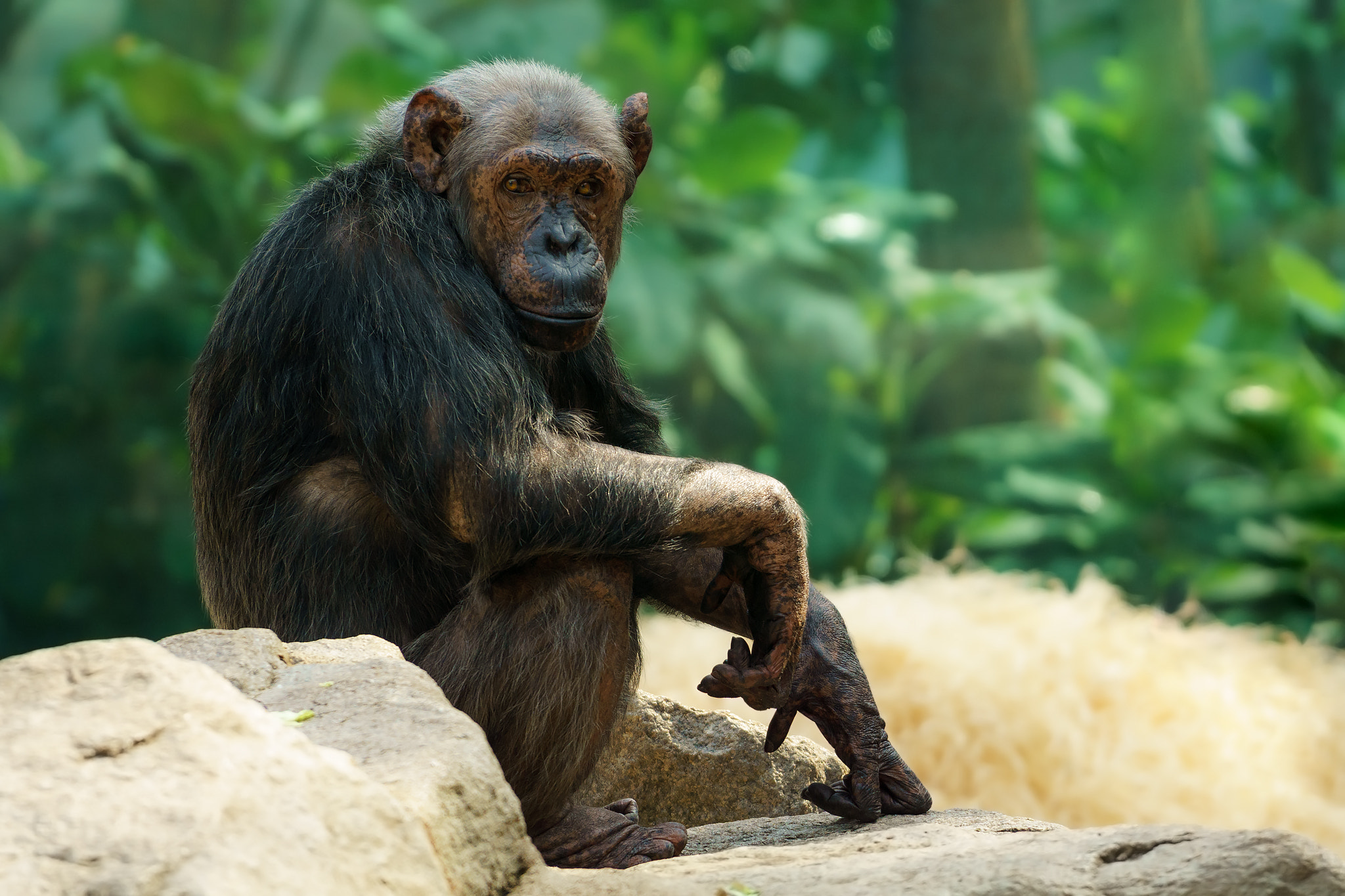
Chimpanzees produce alarm calls in response to threats.

Chimpanzees emit alarm calls in response to predators, such as leopards and snakes. They produce three types of alarm calls: acoustically-variable 'hoos', 'barks', and 'SOS screams'. Alarm signalling is impacted by receiver knowledge and caller age, can be coupled with receiver monitoring, and is important to the understanding of the evolution of hominoid communication.

=== Receiver knowledge ===
Alarm signalling varies depending on the receiver's knowledge of a certain threat. Chimpanzees are significantly more likely to produce an alarm call when conspecifics are unaware of a potential threat or were not nearby when a previous alarm call was emitted. When judging if conspecifics are unaware of potential dangers, chimpanzees do not solely look for behavioural cues, but also assess receiver mental states and use this information to target signalling and monitoring. In a recent experiment, caller chimpanzees were shown a fake snake as a predator and were played pre-recorded calls from receivers. Some receivers emitted calls that were snake-related, and therefore represented receivers with knowledge of the predator, while other receivers emitted calls that were not snake-related, and therefore represented receivers without knowledge of the predator. In response to the non-snake-related calls from receivers, the signallers increased their vocal and nonvocal signalling and coupled it with increased receiver monitoring.

=== Caller age ===
Chimpanzee age impacts the frequency of alarm signalling. Chimpanzees over 80 months of age are more likely to produce an alarm call than those less than 80 months of age. There are several hypotheses for this lack of alarm calling in infants zero to four years of age. The first hypothesis is a lack of motivation to produce alarm calls because of mothers in close proximity that minimize the infant's perception of a threat or that respond to a threat before the infant can. Infants may also be more likely to use distress calls to catch their mother's attention in order for her to produce an alarm call. Infants might also lack the physical ability to produce alarm calls or lack the necessary experience to classify unfamiliar objects as dangerous and worthy of an alarm signal. Therefore, alarm calling may require advanced levels of development, perception, categorization, and social cognition.

=== Other factors ===
Other factors, such as signaller arousal, receiver identity, or increased risk of predation from calling, do not have a significant effect on the frequency of alarm call production.

=== Receiver monitoring ===
However, while alarm signals can be coupled with receiver monitoring, there is a lack of consensus on the definition, starting age, and purpose of monitoring. It is either defined as the use of three subsequent gaze alternations, from a threat to a nearby conspecific and back to the threat, or as the use of two gaze alternations. Moreover, while some studies only report gaze alternation as starting in late juveniles, other studies report gaze alternation in infants as early as five months of age. In infants and juveniles, it is potentially a means of social referencing or social learning through which younger chimpanzees check the reactions of more experienced conspecifics in order to learn about new situations, such as potential threats. It has also been proposed to be a communicative behaviour or simply the result of shifts in attention between different environmental elements.

=== Evolution of hominoid communication ===
The evolution of hominoid communication is evident through chimpanzee 'hoo' vocalizations and alarm calls. Researchers propose that communication evolved as natural selection diversified 'hoo' vocalizations into context-dependent 'hoos' for travel, rest, and threats. Context-dependent communication is beneficial and likely maintained by selection as it facilities cooperative activities and social cohesion between signallers and receivers that can increase the likelihood of survival. Alarm calls in chimpanzees also point to the evolution of hominoid language. Callers assess conspecifics' knowledge of threats, fill their need for information, and, in doing so, use social cues and intentionality to inform communication. Filling a gap in information and incorporating social cues and intentionality into communication are all components of human language. These shared elements between chimpanzee and human communication suggest an evolutionary basis, most likely that the last common human ancestor with chimpanzees also possessed these linguistic abilities.

== False alarm calls ==
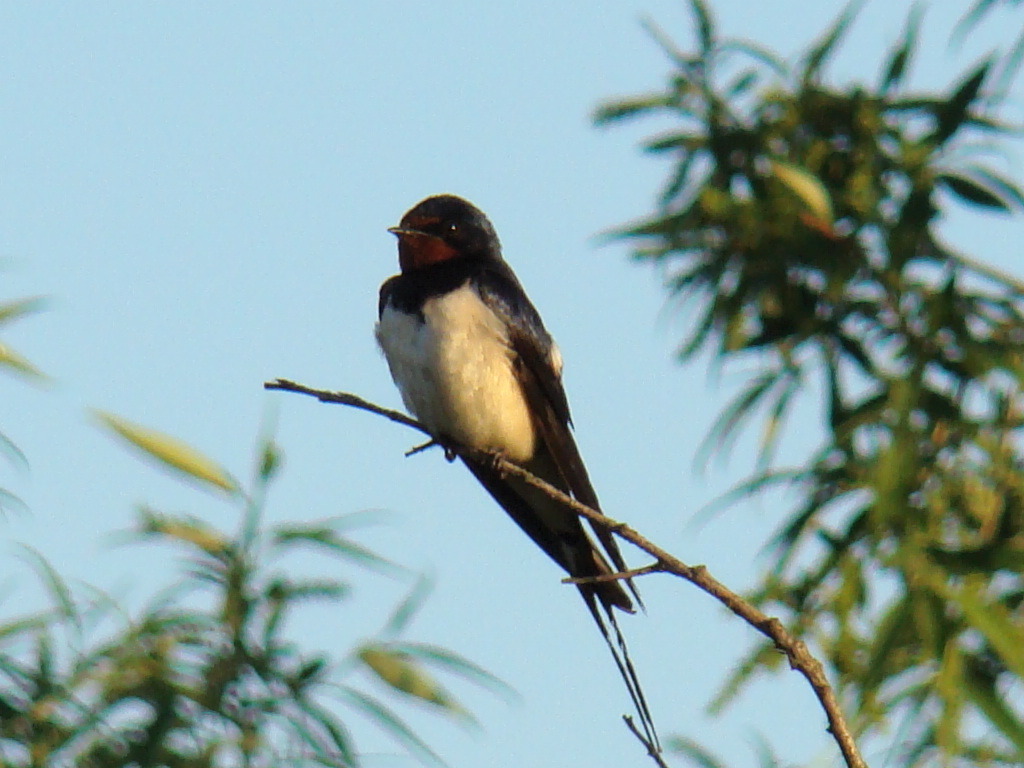
Deceptive vocalizations are given by male barn swallows.

Deceptive alarm calls are used by male swallows (Hirundo rustica). Males give these false alarm calls when females leave the nest area during the mating season, and are thus able to disrupt extra-pair copulations. As this is likely to be costly to females, it can be seen as an example of sexual conflict.

Counterfeit alarm calls are also used by thrushes to avoid intraspecific competition. By sounding a bogus alarm call normally used to warn of aerial predators, they can frighten other birds away, allowing them to eat undisturbed.

Vervets seem to be able to understand the referent of alarm calls instead of merely the acoustic properties, and if another species' specific alarm call (terrestrial or aerial predator, for instance) is used incorrectly with too high of a regularity, the vervet will learn to ignore the analogous vervet call as well.

== Alarm pheromones ==
Alarm signals need not be communicated only by auditory means. For example, many animals may use chemosensory alarm signals, communicated by chemicals known as pheromones. Minnows and catfish release alarm pheromones (Schreckstoff) when injured, which cause nearby fish to hide in dense schools near the bottom. At least two species of freshwater fish produce chemicals known as disturbance cues, which initiates a coordinated antipredator defence by increasing group cohesion in response to fish predators. Chemical communication about threats is also known among plants, though it is debated to what extent this function has been reinforced by actual selection. Lima beans release volatile chemical signals that are received by nearby plants of the same species when infested with spider mites. This 'message' allows the recipients to prepare themselves by activating defense genes, making them less vulnerable to attack, and also attracting another mite species that is a predator of spider mites (indirect defence). Although it is conceivable that other plants are only intercepting a message primarily functioning to attract "bodyguards", some plants spread this signal on to others themselves, suggesting an indirect benefit from increased inclusive fitness.

Deceptive chemical alarm signals are also employed. For example, the wild potato, Solanum berthaultii, emits the aphid alarm-pheromone, (E)-β-farnesene, from its leaves, which functions as a repellent against the green peach aphid, Myzus persicae.

== See also ==
- Group selection
- Kin selection
- Mobbing call
