= Robert Hinde =

British zoologist, ethologist and psychologist

Robert Hinde CBE FRS FBA
- Born: Robert Aubrey Hinde; 26 October 1923; Norwich, England, UK
- Died: 23 December 2016 (aged 93)
- Education: St John's College, Cambridge (BA); Balliol College, Oxford (MA, DPhil)
- Scientific career
- Fields: Zoology; Behavioural ecology; Ornithology; Primatology; Ethology
- Workplaces: University of Cambridge
- Thesis: A Comparative Behaviour Study of the Paridae (1951)
- Doctoral advisor: David Lack
- Doctoral students: Patrick Bateson; Tim Clutton-Brock; Dian Fossey; Jane Goodall; Stephanie Tyler

Robert Aubrey Hinde CBE FRS FBA /haɪnd/ (26 October 1923 – 23 December 2016) was a British zoologist, ethologist and psychologist. He served as the emeritus Royal Society research professor of zoology at the University of Cambridge. Hinde is best known for his ethological contributions to the fields of animal behaviour and developmental psychology.

== Early life ==
Hinde was born in Norwich, the county town of Norfolk, England, on 26 October 1923, to Ernest and Isabella Hinde. Ernest was a medical doctor whose family was independently wealthy through the textile trade; although World War I would impact the textile branch of the Hinde family, Ernest's immediate family unit, which included Robert's older siblings John and Isobel, would remain well-off due to his medical degree. The family had a keen interest in the natural sciences that included long mountainous hikes, which allowed Hinde to develop an interest in birdwatching.

At 14, Hinde attended Oundle School, an all-boys boarding school in the market town of Oundle in Northamptonshire. At Oundle, Hinde was encouraged out of the natural sciences and into the "harder sciences", such as chemistry. Although he would return to the natural sciences, Hinde would later credit this formal training in the physical sciences for shaping the way that he approached his career in zoology, ethology, and psychology.

== Military service ==
Hinde joined the Royal Air Force in 1940 at the age of 17, one year after England declared war on Germany. He had been in the Officers' Training Corp while at Oundle, and when he was called up in the RAF, Hinde was sent to the Air Crew Receiving Centre in St. John's Wood. While at St. John's Wood, Hinde received word that his brother, John, had been torpedoed off the coast of Africa. Hinde would remain in the RAF for 6 years, rising to the rank of Flight Lieutenant before being given an early release in 1946 for a special exhibition at St John's College, Cambridge.

Throughout his life, Hinde was a staunch defender of peace. During his military service, Hinde viewed war as an unfortunate necessity. However, after the end of World War II, Hinde slowly concluded that the "preciousness of peace" was far more important than wartime victory. Through the rest of his life and his career, Hinde was active in a number of war-avoidant groups, including the Pugwash Conferences on Science and World Affairs; the group sought to avoid violent conflict by working behind-the-scenes to provide policymakers with relevant accurate scientific information. Specifically, Hinde emphasized the need to distinguish various levels of aggression, from individual conflict to group conflict to world war.

== Education ==
Upon leaving the RAF in 1946, Hinde enrolled as an undergraduate at St. John's College, and read chemistry, physiology, and zoology. He received a first in Part II zoology in 1948. While at St. John's, Hinde also served as the secretary for the Cambridge Bird Club; with the help of the British Trust for Ornithology, Hinde was able to publish several papers on the behavior of several species of birds during this time. One such paper, in which he carefully recorded species of tits opening milk jugs left outside, remains a seminal work in social learning. Hinde would later describe interactions with a young David Attenborough in which they would help each other with dissections. In his last year at St. John's, Hinde also met his first wife, Hester, with whom he would have 4 children.

In 1948, Hinde accepted a position at Balliol College, Oxford, studying under David Lack. Although Lack had envisioned Hinde's research to focus on the feeding ecology of jackdaws and rooks, Hinde convinced him to change the research program to pursue study of the great tit. While Lack was Hinde's official supervisor, and "was enormously helpful in teaching [Hinde] to be critical and describe selectively and write concisely", Hinde credited the most major influence on his later work to Niko Tinbergen, who arrived at Oxford in 1950. Tinbergen was on the cusp of becoming a seminal figure in the field of ethology and behavior with his "four 'why’s' of behavior", and this allowed Hinde to learn the ethological methods early on and apply them to the rest of his career. Hinde received a D.Phil in 1950; his thesis focused on the annual cycle and behavior of the great tit, and on comparing it to other members of the family Paridae. The thesis marked the first systematic observation and description of the annual behavior of the species.

== Academic career ==
=== Cambridge and Madingley Field Station ===
After receiving his D.Phil., Hinde accepted a position from W.H. Thorpe that involved being the curator of a field station location in the village of Madingley. Although the position included a condition that Hinde was not to carry out his own independent research, both Thorpe and Hinde ignored this stipulation. Hinde carried out a variety of research projects in avian species, in the areas of comparative ethology, imprinting, motivation and habituation, and canary nest-building behavior. The nest-building study was particularly interesting, with its interdisciplinary approach that incorporated not only ethological methods, but endocrinological ones as well, by incorporating a study of hormonal influence on nest-building.

During his time at Madingley, Hinde developed a collaborative friendship with renowned developmental psychologist John Bowlby. Bowlby was intrigued by the concept of using strict ethological approaches in his observations of children; to that point, developmental psychology had been heavily focused on psychoanalysis and learning theories of mother-infant attachment. Bowlby, through Hinde's ethological influence, developed a socio-emotive attachment theory for which he would later become known. The introduction of strict, objective observational data collection would become a staple of developmental psychology methods. On Hinde's side, the friendship with Bowlby introduced him to psychological theories and ideas about the influence that relationships among individuals can have on observed behavior. Hinde, at Bowlby's invitation, attended a recurring seminar that included psychologists of various fields, exposing him to many ideas of learning theory and analysis.

=== Primates ===
==== Rhesus macaque colony at Madingley ====
Hinde's interest in mother-infant interactions led to a collaboration with Bowlby to set up a rhesus macaque colony at Madingley. The two agreed that monkey mothers and their offspring would be an acceptable analogue for human mother-infant interactions, and would allow for experimental work to be conducted. In 1958, a building and large outdoor pens were built for six groups of rhesus macaques; four years later, a permanent laboratory space was built.

Initial studies at the site focused on documenting the behavior and facial expressions of the macaques, which would aid in individual identification. For this purpose, "check sheets" were developed to record behavior at half minute intervals. This type of observational data collection would become a staple method of ethological and behavioral studies, and continues to be used today. Using this type of data collection, Hinde and his colleagues were able to quantitatively record interactions between individuals as well as proximities between individuals, leading to the ability to calculate rates of behaviors as a measurement of the quality of relationship.

Hinde and his colleagues also conducted empirical research in the form of separation studies in which mothers were separated from infants in the presence or absence of their larger social group. Such separation studies highlighted the importance of large social contexts and relationships for Hinde; each interaction takes place in the context of prior interactions, so the enduring relationship between individuals is key to understanding behavior. Hinde's careful quantitative ethological approach allowed observers to use their repeated observations to understand the larger social structure of the macaque groups and the relationships that constituted that structure.

==== Field studies ====
Hinde's experience working with primates at Madingley led to him being heavily involved in the founding of several field sites for the study of great apes in Africa in the 1960s and 1970s. He worked with Louis Leakey, the founder of many of the sites, and trained many of the young researchers that would become some of the best-known primatologists. For example, Leakey wanted to get formal scientific training for Jane Goodall, who had been working at the site for some years but lacked a bachelor's degree. Hinde agreed to take her on as a PhD student and to handle the bureaucratic issues that would arise from pursuing a PhD without a bachelor's degree but was initially her "sternest critic until he came to Gombe". Hinde would visit the site at Gombe several times and would be integral to the introduction of his quantitative recording methods at the site. His work would make the data collected by Goodall and colleagues more objective and more comparable across multiple observers at different time periods; this allowed for the longitudinal data collection that was a hallmark of the site.

Hinde also trained Dian Fossey, who studied mountain gorillas at the Virunga field site; Fossey came to Madingley to become Hinde's student before returning to Rwanda. Fossey's work would provide a detailed account of the social behavior and ecology of the gorillas, and she would go on to found the Dian Fossey Gorilla Fund International to support and drive the conservation of gorilla species.

Hinde would collaborate with and train other primatologists working in a variety of species, including Thelma Rowell, Anne Pusey, Richard Wrangham, Sandy Harcourt, Robert Seyfarth, and Dorothy Cheney, among many others. Hinde's supervising emphasized the objective ethological data collection methods that he had popularized in the field through his work with the rhesus macaques at Madingley.

=== Child development and developmental psychology ===
During the 1970s and 1980s, Hinde was also involved in studies of human-mother interaction; he had developed a "dialectical" framework of attachment using a blend of ethology's objective observation and Bowlby's focus on relationship quality. Hinde, along with his second wife, Joan Stephenson-Hinde, conducted research using at-home questionnaires along with playgroup ethological observations to compare an individual child's interactions with his mother and the child's behavior during playgroup; they were able to establish consistency in the child's interactions over time. In addition, the studies established sex differences in the ways that children interacted with their mothers, their teachers, and their peers.

Hinde, with colleagues, also conducted cross-cultural studies with similar methods in Cambridge and in Budapest, finding that Hungarian children tended to be exhibit more masculine features and less feminine features on behavioral measurements.

=== Psychological and philosophical ideas of religion, relationships, and institutions ===
Through the 1990s, Hinde found himself becoming more and more drawn to psychological and philosophical ideas of the mind. Hinde retired from Cambridge in 1994, but continued to write extensively on ideas of religion and morality. One of his major arguments concerned the components of religions (for instance, beliefs, ritual, values, and sociality) and whether the nature of these components could be understood using traditional biological principles. Hinde's own views were summarized when he said, "'it does not matter too much what you believe, for many different cultural beliefs bring meaning to believers' lives (though differences in religious beliefs can lead to horrendous conflict). But what does matter is how people behave." He also hypothesized about the evolution of pro-social groups, saying that groups in which members behave pro-socially and cooperate are most successful despite the conflict between the self and the group that's introduced by pro-sociality. He argued that this conflict was managed by what is commonly called morality.

== Major positions held ==
- 1951–54 – Research fellow, St. John's College, Cambridge
- 1956–58 – Steward, St. John's College
- 1958–63 – Tutor, St. John's College
- 1958–89; 1994–2016 – Fellow, St. John's College
- 1989–94 – Master, St. John's College, Cambridge
- 1950–58 – Curator, Ornithological Field Station, later named Sub–Department of Animal Behaviour, Department of Zoology, Cambridge
- 1958–63 – Assistant director of research, Sub–Department of Animal Behaviour
- 1963–89 – Royal Society Research Professor
- 1970–89 – Honorary director, Medical Research Council Unit on the Development & Integration of Behaviour
- 1979 – Hitchcock Professor, University of California, Berkeley
- 1983 – Green Visiting Scholar, University of Texas
- 2002–07 – Chair, British Pugwash Group. (later, president)
- 2008–16 – President, Movement for the Abolition of War

== Major lifetime awards ==
=== Fellowships ===
- 1974 – Fellow of the Royal Society
- 1974 – Foreign Honorary Member of the American Academy of Arts and Sciences
- 1978 – Honorary Foreign Associate of the US National Academy of Sciences
- 1986 – Honorary Fellow of Balliol College, Oxford
- 1988 – Commander of the British Empire
- 1990 – Member of the Academia Europaea
- 1990 – Honorary Fellow of Trinity College, Dublin
- 1990 – Croonian Lecturer of the Royal Society
- 1996 – Royal Medal, Royal Society
- 2002 – Honorary Fellow of the British Academy

=== Awards ===
Primatology

- 1980 – Osman Hill Medal, Primate Society of Great Britain

Psychology

- 1980 – Wilhelm Wundt Medal, Leipzig

Ethology

- 1981 – Honorary Fellow of the British Psychological Society
- 1991 – Distinguished Scientific Contribution Award, Society for Research in Child Development
- 1993 – G. Stanley Hall Medal, American Psychological Association
- 2003 – Bowlby–Ainsworth Award for Contributions to Attachment Theory and Research
- 2012 – Honorary Member of the Society for Emotion and Attachment Studies

Social psychology

- 1992 – Distinguished Career Award, International Society for the Study of Interpersonal Relationships

Psychiatry

- 1980 – Leonard Cammer Award, New York Psychiatric Institute, Columbia University
- 1987 – Albert Einstein Award for Psychiatry, Albert Einstein College of Medicine, New York
- 1988 – Honorary Fellow of the Royal College of Psychiatry

Anthropology

- 1984 – Rivers Award in Social Anthropology, Cambridge University
- 1990 – Huxley Medal, Royal Anthropological Institute

Zoology

- 1991 – Frink Medal for British Zoologists, Zoological Society of London

== Death ==
Hinde died on 23 December 2016, at the age of 93. He was survived by his second wife, Joan Stevenson-Hinde, his six children, eighteen grandchildren, and seven great-grandchildren.

Academic offices
Preceded by Francis Harry Hinsley	Master of St John's College, Cambridge; 1989–1994	Succeeded by Peter Goddard
