= Robert Seyfarth (scientist) =

American primatologist (born 1948)

- Born: February 16, 1948 (age 78)
- Title: Professor of Psychology
- Spouse: Dorothy Cheney

Academic background
- Education: Harvard College; Cambridge University
- Doctoral advisor: Robert Hinde

Academic work
- Discipline: Psychology
- Sub-discipline: Primatology
- Institutions: University of Pennsylvania

Robert Martin Seyfarth (born February 16, 1948) is an American primatologist and author. With his wife and collaborator Dorothy L. Cheney, he spent years studying the social behavior, communication, and cognition of wild primates in their natural habitat, including more than a decade of fieldwork with baboons in the Okavango Delta of Botswana. Seyfarth, a professor of psychology at the University of Pennsylvania until his retirement, is a member of both the United States National Academy of Sciences and the American Academy of Arts and Sciences.

== Background and career ==
Robert M. Seyfarth was born on February 16, 1948. He grew up in Chicago but enjoyed fishing trips with his father to Canada and the Caribbean. During his senior year at Phillips Exeter Academy, he became interested in science after taking a course on Darwin. In 1970, he graduated from the honors program in biological anthropology at Harvard College. Fascinated by wild primates, Seyfarth then applied to work at Cambridge University with Robert Hinde, who had been the thesis advisor of Jane Goodall. Having been accepted by Hinde, Seyfarth then spent two years (1972–1974) in the field studying baboons in Mountain Zebra National Park in South Africa, together with Dorothy Cheney, whom he had recently married. In 1976, Seyfarth received a doctorate from Cambridge.

After a four-year postdoc at Rockefeller University and another four years at the University of California, Los Angeles (UCLA) as assistant professors, Seyfarth and Cheney moved to the University of Pennsylvania in 1985, where Seyfarth joined the Psychology Department.

== Research ==
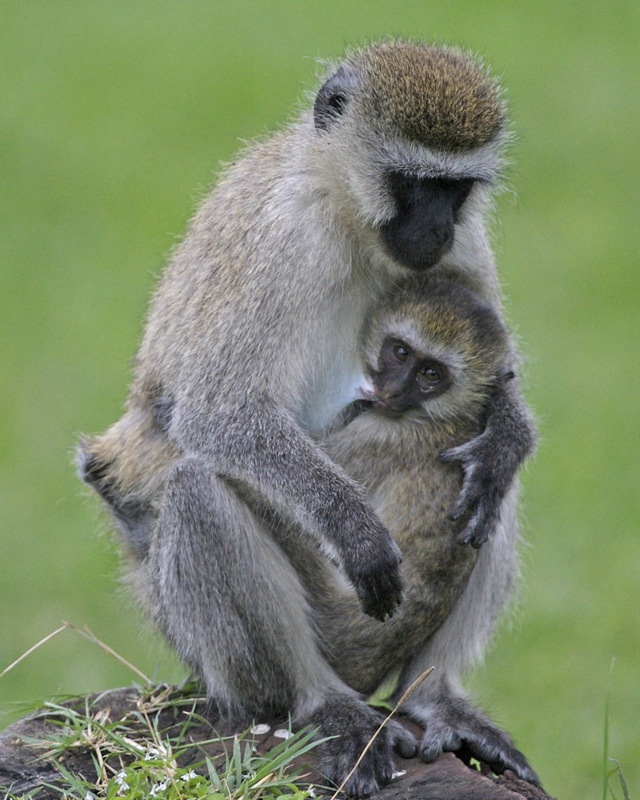
Vervet monkey (Kenya)

Seyfarth's research and publications were largely based on long-term field studies of primates in the natural habitat, usually in partnership with Cheney. From 1977 to 1988, Seyfarth and Cheney studied the behavior and ecology of vervet monkeys in Kenya's Amboseli National Park. Their book How Monkeys See the World (1990) summarized this research. They showed that the alarm calls of vervet monkeys have specific semantic content, so that playing back a recording of one type of call makes monkeys look up in the sky for eagles, while playing back a different call makes monkeys scan the bushes for a snake. According to the Newsletter of the Animal Behavior Society, "These results were the first strong evidence that non-human vertebrates use signals to refer to things external to themselves, and as such revolutionized our understanding of the cognitive side of animal communication."

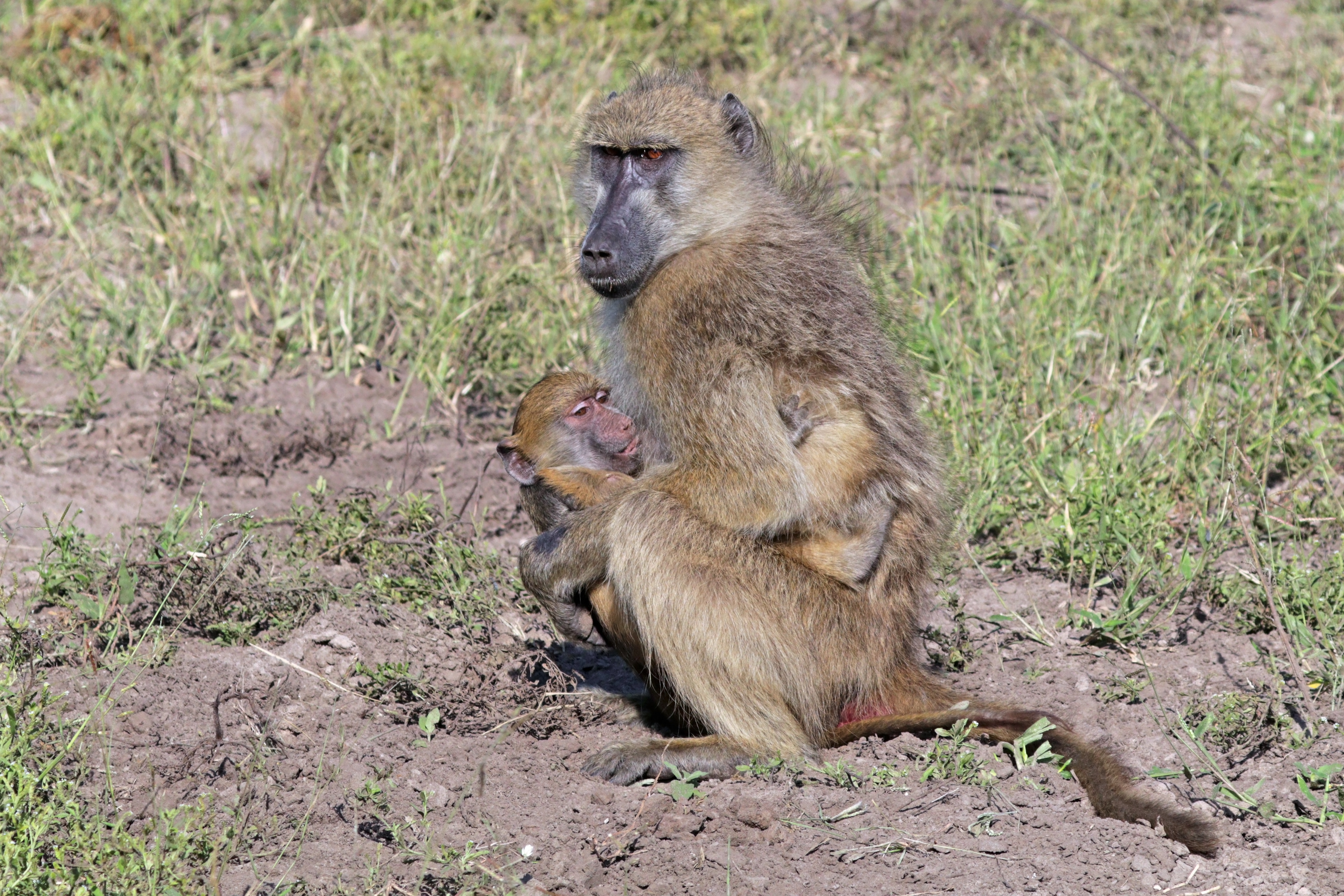
Female Chacma baboon (Papio ursinus griseipes) with infant (Botswana)

From 1992 to 2008, Seyfarth and Cheney studied vocal communication and social structure of chacma baboons at the Moremi Game Reserve in Botswana. This research was summarized in their book Baboon Metaphysics (2007). (Note: The title is based on a comment by Charles Darwin: "He who understands baboon would do more towards metaphysics than Locke.") Seyfarth and Cheney studied baboon vocalizations, social relationships, and social cognition, with a particular interest in factors that contribute to baboon fitness. Their research showed that baboons are acutely aware of hierarchies and relationships in the group they belong to. Baboon mothers who build healthy relationships with other adults greatly increase the chance of their offspring's survival. According to Seyfarth, the rules for successful baboons are, "like [those] in a Jane Austen novel, be nice to your relatives and get in with the high-ranking relatives".

The Animal Behavior Society has described Seyfarth and Cheney as "pre-eminent leaders not just in primate communication but in the field of animal communication as a whole."

== Honors ==
Seyfarth was elected to the American Academy of Arts and Sciences in 2012 and to the National Academy of Science in 2017.

The Proceedings of the National Academy of Sciences awarded its 2010 Cozzarelli Prize, for the best article in the area of Behavioral and Social Sciences, to a paper about baboon collaboration coauthored by Cheney and Seyfarth.

== Representative publications ==
- Cheney, D.L. & Seyfarth, R.M. (1990) How Monkeys See The World: Inside The Mind of Another Species. Chicago: University of Chicago Press. ISBN 9780226102467
- Cheney, D.L. & Seyfarth, R.M. (2007) Baboon Metaphysics: The Evolution of a Social Mind. Chicago: University of Chicago Press. ISBN 9780226102443
- Smuts, B., Cheney, D., Seyfarth, R., Wrangham, R. & Struhsaker, T. (1987) Primate Societies. Chicago: University of Chicago Press. ISBN 9780226767161
