= Michael Owren =

American psychologist (1955–2014)

Michael J. Owren
- Born: July 19, 1955; Oslo, Norway
- Died: January 15, 2014 (aged 58); Atlanta, Georgia
- Education: Reed College (BA, 1977); Indiana University Bloomington (PhD, 1986)
- Scientific career
- Fields: Psychology; Animal Communication; Evolution of Language

Michael J. Owren (July 19, 1955 – January 15, 2014) was a Norwegian born American psychologist who contributed to the understanding of animal communication, the evolution of language, emotional communication, and vocal acoustics. His work focused on vocal phenomena in animals and humans. He pioneered digital spectral analysis techniques, first developed in speech science, for use in studies of animal communication. He studied primate vocalizations in terms of acoustics and communicative functions.

== Biography ==
Owren studied and worked in the United States and New Zealand. He received a B.A. in psychology from Reed College in 1977 and a Ph.D. in experimental psychology from Indiana University Bloomington in 1986. He went on to a postdoctoral fellowship in psychology at the University of Pennsylvania, 1986 to 1989 and a postgraduate research position at the California National Primate Research Center, the University of California, Davis, 1986 to 1990.

From 1990 until his death in 2014, Owren held faculty positions at the University of Colorado Denver, the University of Otago in New Zealand, Reed College, Cornell University, Georgia State University, and Emory University.

His research was funded by the National Institutes of Health, including the National Institute of Mental Health, the National Institute of Child Health and Human Development, and the National Institute of Neurological Disorders and Stroke, as well as by the National Geographic Society, and by the various institutions where he studied and held faculty positions.

Owren served in editorial roles for the Journal of the Acoustical Society of America, Emotion Review, Interaction Studies, the Journal of Comparative Psychology, and Psychological Science. He reviewed for numerous additional journals.

He was awarded the status of Fellow in the Association for Psychological Science and the Acoustical Society of America. He received a National Service Research Award and the M. Z. Sinnott Memorial Primatological Research Fellowship. He was a member of the American Society of Primatologists, the Animal Behavior Society, the Comparative Cognition Society, the Emotion Research Group, and the International Primatological Society.

He lectured widely around the world, often invited to speak in scientific venues. A few examples were an invited lecture for the Institute of Theoretical Biology at Humboldt University, Berlin (2001); a lecture on Comparative Cognition, evolutionary psychology, and brain evolution at Cold Spring Harbor Laboratory (2005); a lecture on Encoding and decoding of biological signals at the Santa Fe Institute (2004); a workshop presentation on the role on subcortical primate-like circuitry in human vocal development for the Konrad Lorenz Institute for Evolution and Cognition Research, Austria (2005); and a workshop for the Ernst Strungmann Forum at the Frankfurt Institute for Advanced Studies, Frankfurt am Main (2010).

== Works ==
Owren's early scientific works included contributions on acoustic analysis of vocalizations in non-human primates. As a pioneer of acoustic methods in animal communication, he co-edited a volume on the methods that underlie such research. His body of work has been explored in a variety of books written and edited by scholars from a variety of disciplines. For example, Owren's work has been cited and discussed in volumes on primate communication, language development, language evolution, and origins of emotion.

His work is perhaps best known for having challenged a widely held view that some animals communicate semantically, especially through alarm signals. Owren's later work, in collaboration with Drew Rendall (also a previous postdoctoral fellow in the same University of Pennsylvania program) and others, argued and provided empirical support for the contrasting idea that animal vocalizations have their effects by influencing attentional, arousal, emotional, and motivational states in the listener, rather than by imparting representational messages, as occurs in human language. These arguments have been widely discussed and debated in volumes devoted to the study of animal behavior and communication.
