= Larry Katz =

American neuroscientist (1956–2005)

Lawrence C. Katz
- Born: 23 December 1956; New York City, U.S.
- Died: 26 November 2005 (aged 48)
- Education: Ph.D. California Institute of Technology
- Awards: Fellow of the American Association for the Advancement of Science, McKnight Foundation scholar
- Scientific career
- Fields: Neuroscience
- Workplaces: Duke University
- Doctoral advisor: Mark Konishi

Lawrence C. Katz (December 23, 1956 – November 26, 2005) was an American neurobiologist. He was an investigator at the Howard Hughes Medical Institute. His lab was located in Duke University Medical Center, where he was the James B. Duke Professor of Neurobiology.

Katz received his B.S. from the University of Chicago (1981) and his Ph.D. in neurobiology from the California Institute of Technology (1984), where he worked with Masakazu Konishi. He performed his postdoctoral work with Torsten Wiesel at the Rockefeller University and continued as an assistant professor at Rockefeller before moving to Duke.

His research focused on the development and function of the mammalian cortex, especially neurotrophins and neurogenesis. He pioneered the application of optical imaging of neurons (using fluorescent calcium or voltage indicators) and photostimulation (using caged glutamate) to probe circuit development. His research centered on the key senses of hearing and language (birdsong), sight and, most recently, smell, where he did groundbreaking research on the functional analysis of the olfactory system. Katz and his colleagues combined biochemistry and physiology to discover a mouse social pheromone—purifying a single, very rare molecule (methylthio)methanethiol (MeSCH_{2}SH; MTMT) from mouse urine based on its ability to stimulate olfactory neurons.

Katz was not directly related to Nobel laureate and fellow neurobiologist Bernard Katz. Larry Katz died of melanoma at the age of 48. There are two awards named after him. The Larry Katz Prize for Innovative Research in Neuroscience is given by Duke University to a neuroscientist whose work reflects Larry's openness to new ideas, creativity, and enthusiasm for technical and conceptual innovation. The Larry Katz Memorial Lecture Award is given in the biennial Cold Spring Harbor Meeting on "Neuronal Circuits: From Structure to Function" to a graduate student who has done the most original and significant work in the past two years on neuronal circuits.

== Journal papers ==
Selected significant publications include:

- Katz, L.C., and Gurney, M.E. (1981). Auditory responses in the zebra finch’s motor system for song. Brain Res. 221, 192–97.
- Katz, L.C., Burkhalter, A., and Dreyer, W.J. (1984). Fluorescent latex microspheres as a retrograde neuronal marker for in vivo and in vitro studies of visual cortex. Nature 310, 498–500.
- Katz, L.C. (1987). Local circuitry of identified projection neurons in cat visual cortex brain slices. J. Neurosci. 7, 1223–49.
- Yuste, R., Peinado, A., and Katz, L.C. (1992). Neuronal domains in developing neocortex. Science 257, 665–69.
- Callaway, E.M., and Katz, L.C. (1993). Photostimulation using caged glutamate reveals functional circuitry in living brain slices. Proc. Natl. Acad. Sci. 90, 7661–65.
- Dalva, M. & Katz, L. Rearrangements of synaptic connections in visual cortex revealed by laser photostimulation. Science 265, 255–58 (1994).
- McAllister, A.K., Lo, D.C., and Katz, L.C. (1995). Neurotrophins regulate dendritic growth in developing visual cortex. Neuron 15, 791–803.
- Riddle, D.R., Lo, D.C., and Katz, L.C. (1995). NT-4-mediated rescue of lateral geniculate neurons from effects of monocular deprivation. Nature 378, 189–91.
- McAllister, A.K., Katz, L.C., and Lo, D.C. (1996). Neurotrophin regulation of cortical dendritic growth requires activity. Neuron 17, 1057–64.
- Weliky, M., and Katz, L.C. (1997). Disruption of orientation tuning in visual cortex by artificially correlated neuronal activity. Nature 386, 680–85.
- Rubin, B.D., and Katz, L.C. (1999). Optical imaging of odorant representations in the mammalian olfactory bulb. Neuron 23, 499–511.
- Crowley, J.C., and Katz, L.C. (1999). Development of ocular dominance columns in the absence of retinal input. Nat. Neurosci. 2, 1125–30.
- Crowley, J.C., and Katz, L.C. (2000). Early development of ocular dominance columns. Science 290, 1321–24.
- Luo, M., Fee, M.S., and Katz, L.C. (2003). Encoding pheromonal signals in the accessory olfactory bulb of behaving mice. Science 299, 1196–201.
- Lin, D.Y., Zhang, S.Z., Block, E., and Katz, L.C. (2005). Encoding social signals in the mouse main olfactory bulb. Nature 434, 470–77.
- Mizrahi, A., Lu, J., Irving, R., Feng, G., and Katz, LC. (2006) In vivo imaging of juxtaglomerular neuron turnover in the mouse olfactory bulb. Proc Natl Acad Sci USA. 103, 1912–17.
- Lin, D. Y., Shea, S.D., and Katz, L.C. (2006) Representation of natural stimuli in the rodent main olfactory bulb. Neuron. 50, 937–49.
- Davison, I.G., and Katz, L.C. (2007) Sparse and selective odor coding by mitral/tufted neurons in the main olfactory bulb. J. Neurosci. 27, 2091–101.
- Arenkiel, B.R., Klein, M.E., Davison, I.G., Katz, L.C., and Ehlers, M.D. (2008) Genetic control of neuronal activity in mice conditionally expressing TRPV1. Nat Methods. 5, 299–302.
- Ben-Shaul, Y., Katz, L.C., Mooney, R., and Dulac, C. (2010) In vivo vomeronasal stimulation reveals sensory encoding of conspecific and allospecific cues by the mouse accessory olfactory bulb. Proc Natl Acad Sci. 107, 5172–77.
