= Satsue Mito =

Japanese zoologist

- Born: April 21, 1914; Saeki-ku, Hiroshima, Japan
- Died: April 7, 2012 (aged 97)
- Occupations: Primary school teacher and instructor at Kyoto University
- Known for: Discovery of sweet potato washing and its spread among monkeys at Kōjima, Miyazaki Prefecture

Satsue Mito (三戸 サツエ, Mito Satsue; April 21, 1914 – April 7, 2012) was a Japanese school teacher and primate researcher. She helped with the Kyoto University Primatology group (composed of Kinji Imanishi, Junichiro Itani) studying wild monkeys on an island called Kōjima, in Miyazaki Prefecture. She identified every monkey in the island and recorded their relationships. She discovered the origin and spreading of sweet potato washing by monkeys. She was an instructor of Kyoto University working with other researchers between 1970 and 1984.

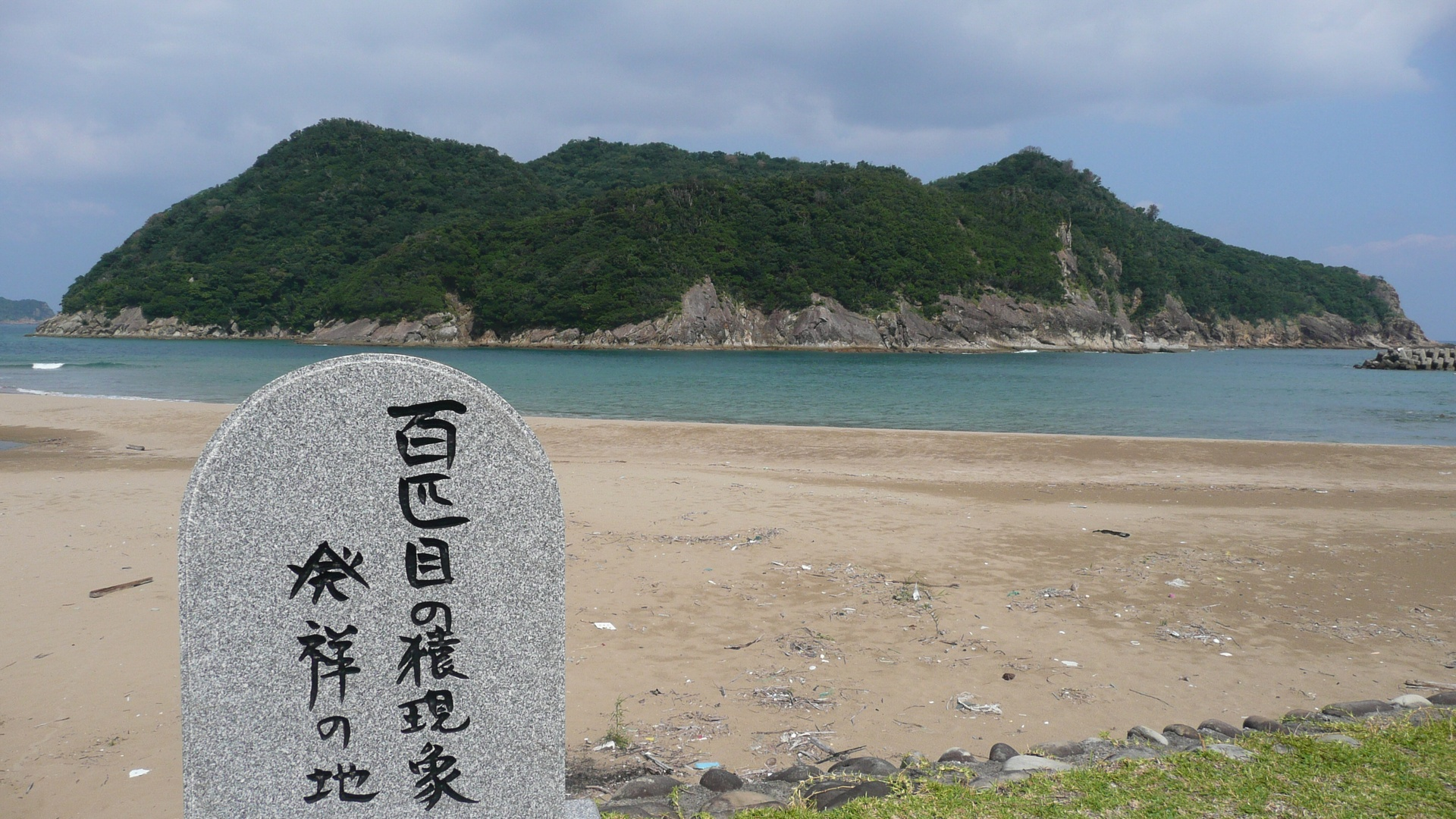
Kōjima seen from the mainland

== Life ==
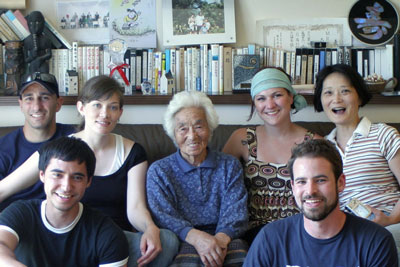
Satsue Mito in her house in Kojima with student visitors from the United States in May 2007

She was born in what is now Itsukaichi machi, Saeki-ku, Hiroshima. Her father was Fujiichi Kanji, and at that time he was in a difficult financial condition because his business had failed. After studying at Yasuda High School, she studied further and was qualified as a teacher in 1932. In 1934, she got married and went to northern Korea for her job. In 1940, her husband died and she moved to Dalian, China with three children and worked for a Chinese school. In 1947, she returned to Japan and settled at Miyazaki. While working as a teacher, she helped with the Kyoto University monkey research team. In 1969, she obtained a science encouragement award. She retired from Nango Elementary School in 1970 and became a member of the Kyoto University team at the Kōjima Observatory. In 1972, she was awarded the Sankei Publication Award for children for her book Monkeys at Koshima and in 1974, she was awarded the Eiji Yoshikawa award. Umeyo Mori, her second daughter, started as a field investigator of monkeys at Kyoto University Primate Center after graduating from the mathematics course of Tsuda College. In 2011, she retired from the post of vice-president of Nagoya Bunri University. She died of old age at 97 on April 7, 2012.

== Career ==
Satsue's father sent a letter to the Ministry of Education (now the Ministry of Education, Culture, Sports, Science and Technology) asking the ministry for the investigation of the island of Kōjima. In 1934, this letter resulted in the island and its monkeys being designated as a natural monument under the natural monument law of 1919. Keizo Shibusawa wrote about him in a book titled Inumo Arukeba Boniataru. In 1948, Kinji Imanishi of Kyoto University extended their study tour to the island and stayed in her father's lodging house. However, there were no monkeys. Between December 1948 and January 1949, many hunters came to the island and likely killed many monkeys for money. The investigators of Kyoto University first observed 9 monkeys, while in 1934, about 40 or 50 monkeys had been observed. In 1969, Koshima Observatory was built as part of the Kyoto University Primate Center.

In 1954, Mito discovered that a young female monkey washed sweet potatoes and this spread to her fellow monkeys, to 74% of the monkeys but not to older monkeys except her mother. Other customs also were seen. This was reported in a paper by Masao Kawai and this phenomenon was reported at a congress in USSR, but Russian investigators thought that humans must have trained the monkeys.

== Influence ==
Crown Prince Naruhito read one of the books of Mito and she was called to their house and chatted about the monkeys with the family of Akihito, on two occasions. Masaru Ibuka was also interested in monkeys and lead a group of presidents who were born in 1908, or the year of the Monkey, to Kōjima.

== Bibliography ==
- Satsue Mito, Monkeys and I, with their family in Koshima, 1972, Kodansha, Tokyo
- Satsue Mito, Monkeys in Koshima1984, Popura sha, ISBN 978-4-591-01026-6
- Satsue Mito, My grandchildren are Koshima's 100 monkeys 1989, Gakushu Kenkyusha ISBN 4-05-102995-6
- Katsuaki Shiraishi, Kind and strong, What Satsue Mito told me 1994, Honda Kikaku, Takaokacho, Miyazaki Prefecture.
- Keizo Shibusawa, Inumo Arukeba Boni Ataru(Good luck may come unexpectedly) 1961, Kadokawa Shoten
