= Junichiro Itani =

Japanese Anthropology Professor

- 伊谷 純一郎
- Born: 9 May 1926; Tottori, Japan
- Died: 19 August 2001 (aged 75); Kyoto, Japan
- Education: Kyoto University
- Children: Genichi Itani (Anthropologist)
- Father: Kenzo Itani (Yōga painter)
- Awards: Huxley Award in Anthropology (1984)
- Scientific career
- Fields: primatology
- Workplaces: Kyoto University

Junichiro Itani

Japanese name
- Kanji: 伊谷 純一郎
- Hiragana: いたにじゅんいちろう
Transcriptions
- Revised Hepburn: Itani Jun'ichirō
- Traditional Hepburn: Itani Jun-Ichirō
- Kunrei-shiki: Itani Zyun'itirô
- Nihon-shiki: Itani Zyun'itirô

Junichiro Itani (伊谷 純一郎, Itani Jun'ichirō; May 9, 1926 – August 19, 2001) was a Japanese anthropologist who served as a professor emeritus at Kyoto University and as president of the Primate Society of Japan. He is considered a founder of the discipline of Japanese primatology.

== Biography ==
Junichiro Itani was born at Tottori. His father, Kenzo Itani, was a Yōga painter.

He entered Kyoto University, Faculty of Science. He majored in ethology under Kinji Imanishi, eventually becoming one of the leading figures in Japanese primatology. He received a BS in March 1951, and became a researcher at Japan Monkey Centre, Inuyama, Aichi. He observed Japanese macaques at Takasakiyama Natural Zoological Garden. In 1962, he submitted his doctoral dissertation titled "Communication of wild Japanese macaque"(野生ニホンザルのコミュニケーションに関する研究).

He became an assistant professor at Kyoto University, Faculty of Science in October 1962, and was promoted to professor in 1981. He founded the Primate Research Institute and the Center for African Area Studies at that university in 1986, and he served as the first chief of the latter center until his retirement. He retired from Kyoto University in 1990 and became a professor at Kobe Gakuin University (until 1998).

He died at age 75 of pneumonia.

As with most Japanese primatologists, his early research was on Japanese macaques (Macaca fuscata), but most of his career focused on African primates, especially chimpanzees (Pan troglodytes). He started research in Africa in 1958. The majority of his work was based around the social structures of primate society.

== Awards ==
- Asahi Prize (1968)
- The Huxley Award in Anthropology (Royal Anthropological Institute, London. (1984)
- Medals of Honor (Japan)(Medal with Purple Ribbon) (1992)
- Order of the Sacred Treasure

== Books available in English ==
- Japanese Monkeys in Takasakiyama (1954)
- Hominid culture in primate perspective / Duane Quiatt and Junichiro Itani, editors (1994)
- A Comparative study of ecological anthropology in tropical Africa
- Great Ape Societies by William C McGrew; Linda F Marchant; Toshisada Nishida; Jane Goodall and Junichiro Itani

== Relatives ==
- Father: Kenzo Itani(伊谷賢蔵) was a Yōga painter. He studied at Higher Technical School, Kyoto. He learned Yōga under Jutaro Kuroda. He lived as a painter and taught painting at Kyoto University of Education.
- Son: Genichi Itani (伊谷原一) is an anthropologist (primatology). He worked at Primate Research Institute
- Son: Juichi Itani (伊谷樹一) is an agriculturist.
