= Kyokan =

Japanese word

Kyokan (Japanese: 共(きょう)感(かん), romanized: kyōkan) is a Japanese word that is used in various fields and means "to feel oneness with".

== Use in primatology ==
One example is a concept forwarded by Masao Kawai as a means of studying primates in the field. It first appeared to Western primatologists in Kawai's book Ecology of Japanese Monkeys (1969).

For primatologists, the kyokan method is a very subjective and empathic form of research. It involves feelings of mutual relationship, attachment and shared experience between both the researcher and their subject.

As Kawai argued: "By positively entering the group, by making contact on some level, objectivity can be established. It is on this basis that the experimental method can be introduced into natural behaviour study and which makes scientific analysis possible." His use of the term kyokan seems to be somewhat unusual amongst his peers in Japanese primatology, but the underlying principles are part of the foundation of the Japanese discipline in the field.

== Other uses ==
Another example of how the word is used can be seen in game creation. Shigeru Miyamoto, creator of Donkey Kong, Mario and The Legend of Zelda amongst other games, wants game creators to feel kyokan with the future users of their games. He wants "the players to feel about the game what the developers felt themselves."
