= The Kyoto University Research Centre for the Cultural Sciences =

University

Institute for Research in Humanities, Kyoto University
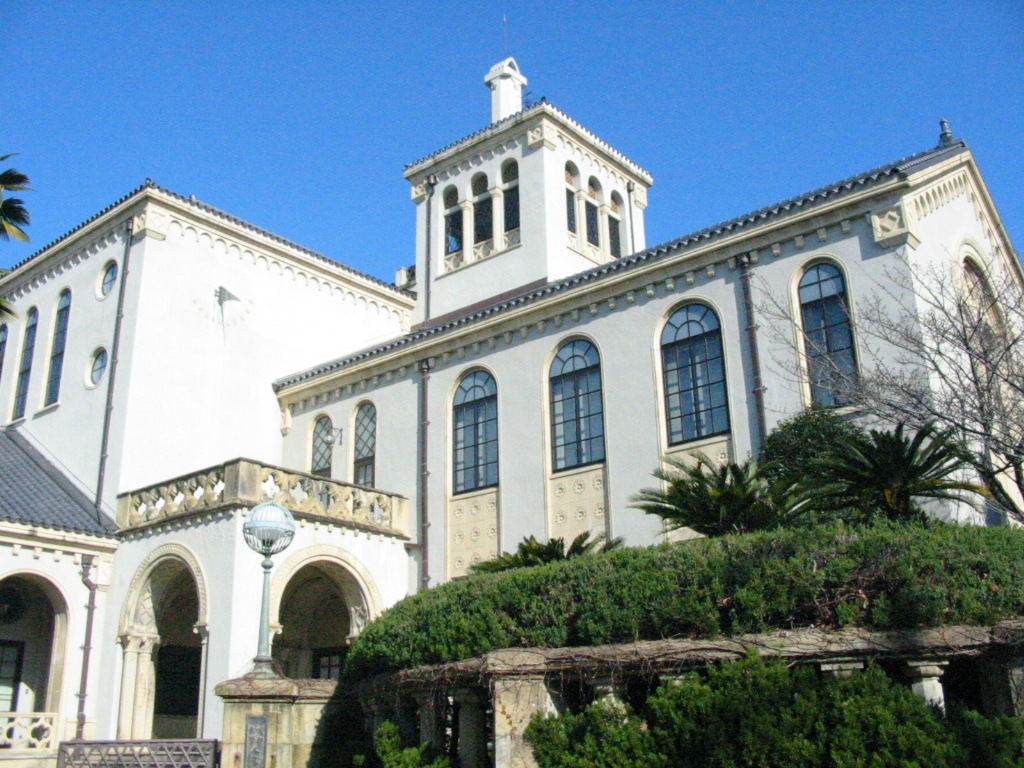
- Main building (designed by Kenzo Tohata)
- Established: 1949
- Focus: Humanities
- Director: Takuji Iwaki
- Key people: Naoki Kano, Kinji Imanishi, Takeo Kuwabara
- Address: Yoshida-Honmachi, Sakyō-ku, Kyoto, Japan
- Location: Kyoto, Kyoto Prefecture, Japan
- Website: https://www.zinbun.kyoto-u.ac.jp/

Institute for Research in Humanities, Kyoto University (京都大学人文科学研究所, Kyōto Daigaku Jinbun Kagaku Kenkyūjo) is an institution for research at Kyoto University. It specializes in humanities and ethno-ecological studies. It has a distinctive school tradition, as heir to the philosophically oriented Kyoto School, but differs from the latter in its broader cultural interests.

== History ==
=== Early history ===
The Institute for Research in Humanities was established in 1949 by re-organizing institutes in Kyoto. The Institute of Humanistic Studies, the Institute of Oriental Studies, and the Institute of Occidental Studies were combined to make the Institute for Research in Humanities.

One of the core was the Institute for Oriental Culture, Kyoto. Institute for Oriental Culture was established in Tokyo and Kyoto in 1929. The establishment was one of the governmental cultural projects undertaken by the Ministry of Foreign Affairs. The building is the current main building, which was completed in November 1930. The first director was Kano Naoki, who is a sinologist. In 1938, The Institute for Oriental Culture was split in two by the difference in policy.

== Organization ==
There are five research divisions and one attached research center.

1. Research Divisions
- Cultural Research Methodologies Division
- Cultural Processes Division
- Cultural Interrelationships Division
- Cultural Representation Division
- Cultural Composition Division
- Center for Informatics in East Asian Studies (CIEAS)
1. Research Center
- Research Center for Modern and Contemporary China (RCMCC)
