= Girneys =

Soft vocalizations used by species of Old World monkeys

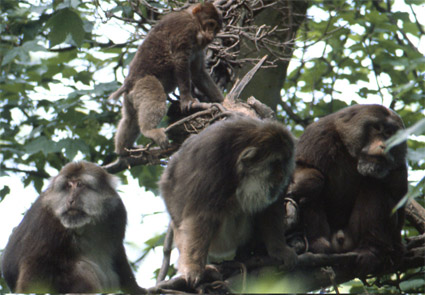
A group of Tibetan macaques

Girneys are soft vocalizations used by species of Old World monkeys to ease affiliative social interactions between unrelated members of the same species. The vocalizations are most commonly used by adult females around birthing season; the female will direct the call towards an unrelated mother and her offspring as an attempt to initiate friendly contact. However, mothers themselves will never direct girneys towards their own offspring as girneys do not increase affiliative interactions between relatives. Monkeys will also produce call when interacting with a dominant member of the same species, and when avoiding further conflict after becoming victim of an agonistic interaction.

In all contexts, the vocalization is beneficial as it allows the signaler to inform potential aggressor that they are nonthreatening, thereby reducing the chance of attack and increasing fitness. Girneys are often accompanied by lip-smacking and a hesitant approach towards the dominant monkey. If the vocalization successfully reduces tension, it may be followed by allogrooming, alloparenting, and/or a rocking embrace.

== Old World monkeys ==
Multiple species of Old World monkeys produce girneys. The actual sound of the vocalization varies slightly by species but its purpose is consistent – to reduce tension between unrelated members of the same species. No accounts of monkeys directing girneys towards different species of monkeys have been observed. Monkeys who use the call include Japanese macaques, rhesus macaques, mandrills, and baboons. However, they have been most extensively studied in species of macaques. The calls are commonly observed in adult Old World monkeys, but rarely in juveniles. This is likely because juveniles are already groomed and protected by their mother and would not benefit from producing an affiliative call.

== Morphology ==
Girneys resemble a moaning and purring sound with a song-like quality. The call stays within a low frequency range, but is very morphologically variable as it does not maintain a consistent temporal pattern. Instead, the vocalizations are uttered in rapid succession, through different patterns each time. The vocalization are produced in conjunction with lip movement and teeth chattering. Dario Maestripieri, professor of comparative human development at the University of Chicago, says the sounds are "made with their mouths almost closed, sort of nasal and relatively soft", and suggested that girneys are similar to human baby talk. In the context of mother offspring dyad approach, the morphology of girneys can be divided into two distinct vocalizations, atonal girneys and tonal girneys. Both atonal and tonal girneys are submissive and accompanied by a hesitant approach.

=== Atonal girneys ===
Vocalizations modified by a process of lip movement on teeth scraping is characteristic of atonal girneys. An adult female will produce this distinct call when approaching a cluster of females and infants late in the birth season, particularly when orientated toward the infant of the group.

=== Tonal girneys ===
Tonal girneys are more morphologically variable than atonal girneys as the characteristic tongue and lip movements are superimposed. The call is produced by an adult female who intends to participate in grooming with an unrelated dominant female. The subordinate directs the call while the dominant is separate from the cluster during birth season.

== Function and context ==
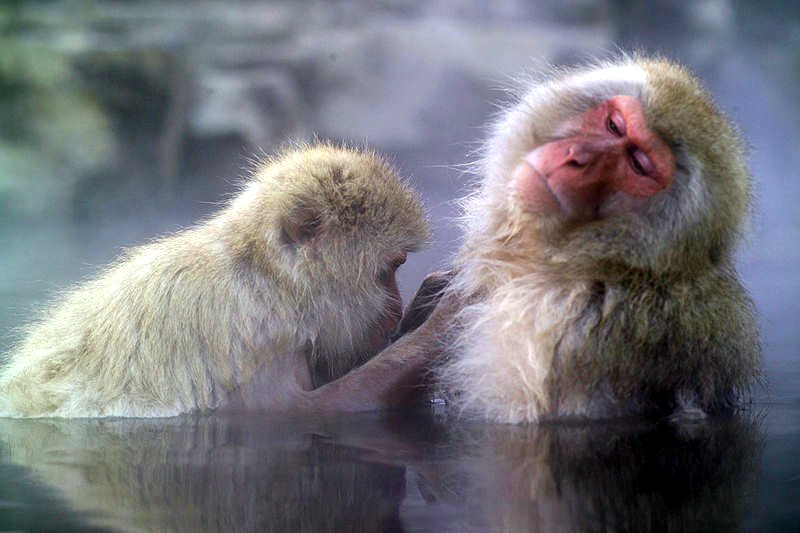
Japanese macaques grooming

=== General function ===
Girneys are used in a variety of contexts but consistently function to ease affiliative social interactions between unrelated members of the same species and are generally directed from the subordinate monkey to the dominant monkey.

=== Establishing friendly contact with unrelated mother-offspring dyad ===
Male macaque do not often participate in infant care, so mothers tend to be highly protective of their infants and will display highly aggressive behavior and even physically attack monkeys who come within close proximity. In attempt to establish friendly contact with mother and minimize chance of attack, the subordinate adult female will produce girneys. The call can also benefit the adult female in that it may increase probability of affiliative physical contact such as grooming, which reduces stress. Monkeys who do not produce the call upon approaching mother-offspring dyad are less likely to attain access to an affiliative interaction. Additionally, females without infants may be allowed access to handling an unrelated mothers infant after initiating friendly contact with girneys. In this case, they often continue to make the call during handling.

=== Acknowledging social hierarchy ===
Japanese macaques form despotic societies in which some members of group are ranked higher than others. The higher ranking macaques are considered dominant, and macaques of lower rank will produce girneys when in close proximity to dominant members, to signal appeasement and acknowledge inferiority. Low ranking females without infants are the least likely to receive girneys while high ranking females with infants are most likely to receive girneys within a troop. This is coherent with the proposition that girneys function to reduce tension, as low ranking females without infants are more likely to be victims of aggression than any other member of troop.

=== Post-conflict affiliation ===
Opponents of a conflict are attracted to each other for a short period of time following the conflict. During this time, the victim will produce girneys in attempt to restore friendly relations with former opponent. The victim is more likely to use the vocalization when opponent is less familiar, indicating that the production of girneys after conflict is dependent on how predictable the winner is to the victim. Despite the reconciliation intent of girneys, victims make themselves vulnerable to further aggression when initiating post conflict affiliation. So it is unclear if the vocalizations are effective in this context.
