= Masao Kawai =

Japanese primatologist (1924–2021)

- 河合雅雄
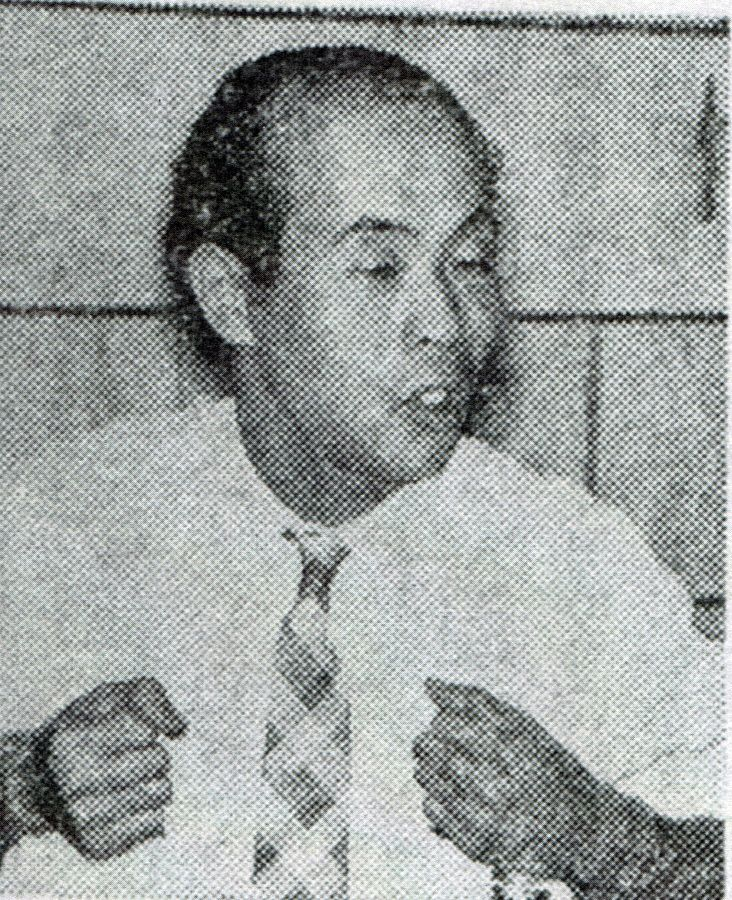
- Masao Kawai in 1961
- Born: 2 January 1924; Sasayama, Hyogo Prefecture, Japan
- Died: 14 May 2021 (aged 97); Tamba-Sasayama, Hyogo Prefecture, Japan
- Education: Ph.D
- Alma mater: Kyoto Imperial University
- Relatives: Hayao Kawai (psychologist)
- Awards: Duke of Edinburgh Prize, Japan Academy
- Scientific career
- Fields: primatology, Behavioural sciences
- Institutions: Kyoto University
- Thesis: ニホンザルの群れ社会に関する実験的研究 (1962)
- Academic advisors: Kinji Imanishi

Masao Kawai

Japanese name
- Kanji: 河合 雅雄
- Hiragana: かわいまさお
Transcriptions
- Revised Hepburn: Kawai Masao
- Traditional Hepburn: Kawai Masao
- Kunrei-shiki: Kawai Masao
- Nihon-shiki: Kawai Masao

Masao Kawai (河合 雅雄, Kawai Masao; January 2, 1924 – May 14, 2021) was a Japanese primatologist, who introduced the concept of kyōkan as a means of studying primates in his book Life of Japanese Monkeys (1969).

== Biography ==
=== Early days and education ===
Masao Kawai was born Tamba-Sasayama, Hyōgo prefecture in 1924. He was the third son of seven brothers. He was taken tuberculosis at 9 years of age, and had been absent from Middle School by pleuritis. Due to his health condition, he was out of conscription at the time of Pacific War. He was educated in Niigata High School by his graduation in 1949. After graduation, he entered Kyoto Imperial University. He majored in ethology and behavioural sciences at Faculty of Science under Kinji Imanishi. He graduated from university in 1952.

=== As a scientist ===
Masao became a research assistant of Hyogo Prefectural University of Agriculture in 1952. He continues the study of primatology, especially Japanese macaque, and wrote a dissertation titled "Experimental research to groups of Japanese macaque" (ニホンザルの群れ社会に関する実験的研究). He received Doctor of Science from Kyoto University in 1962.

He moved to Primate Research Institute, Kyoto University as an assistant professor in 1967, and was promoted professor in 1970. He continued work there and retired in 1987.

Kawai Masao, introduced the concept of kyokan. This was the theory that the only way to attain reliable scientific knowledge was to attain a mutual relation, personal attachment and shared life with animal subjects. Though Kawai is the only Japanese primatologist associated with the use of this term, the underlying principle is part of the foundation of Japanese primate research.

He died in his home at Tamba-Sasayama in 2021.

== Honnor ==
- Asahi Prize (1969)
- Seiji Noma's memorial Juvenile literature award (1976)
- NHK Culture Award (1990)
- Medals of Honor, Purple (1990)
- Sankei Children's Book Award (1992)
- Mainichi Publishing Culture Award (1992)
- Order of the Rising Sun, Third grade (1995)
- Duke of Edinburgh Prize, Japan Academy (2004)

== Relatives ==
- First brother: Hitoshi Kawai was a surgeon. He studied at Niigata Medical Colledge, and took care Masao when Masao studied in Niigata.
- Fifth brother: Hayao Kawai was a Jungian psychologist. He served the chief of the Agency for Cultural Affairs (2002 - 2007).
