= Eizaburō Nishibori =

Japanese scientist

- Born: January 28, 1903; Kyoto
- Died: April 13, 1989 (aged 86); Tokyo
- Resting place: Japan
- Other name: 西堀 榮三郎
- Occupations: scientist, alpinist

Eizaburō Nishibori (西堀 栄三郎, Nishibori Eizaburō; January 28, 1903 – April 13, 1989) was a Japanese scientist, alpinist and technologist. He is also known as the captain of the primary Japanese Antarctica wintering party.

== Biography ==
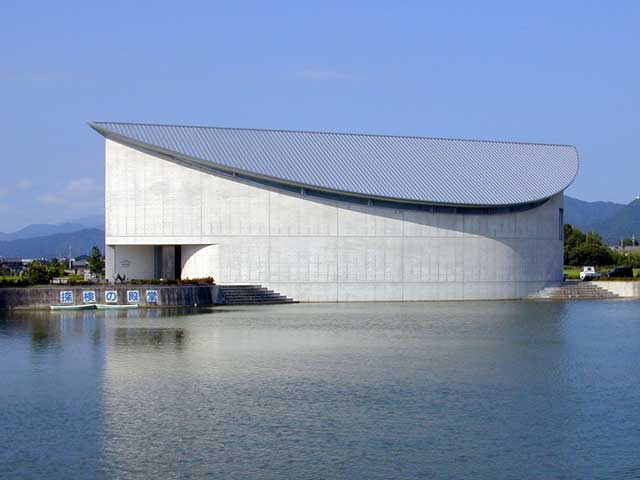
Memorial Museum for Eizaburō Nishibori "Explorer Museum"

=== Early days and Education ===
Eizaburō Nishibori was born in Kyoto in 1903. He graduated from the First Middle School in Kyoto and, entered the Third High School. There were Takeo Kuwabara and Kinji Imanishi, who were his friends from middle school, and they enjoyed the mountaineering. Eizaburō had joined a lecture about the first Japanese Antarctic Expedition (1910–12) by Nobu Shirase at Minami-za in his 11 age, and he had been attracted to exploration since then. When he was a high school student, he met Mr. and Mrs. Einstein and Eizaburō guided them in Kyoto and Nara with his brother.

Eizaburō entered the Kyoto Imperial University and majored chemistry at Faculty of Science. In May 1928, he graduated BA course.

=== After graduating from the University ===
He became a lecturer at his alma mater after his graduation. On the other hand, he continued to love mountaineering, and was a member of the "Paektu Mountain expedition" of Kyoto Imperial University. In 1936, he submitted his doctoral dissertation titled "Chemical research using molecular beams" (分子線による化學的研究). He was promoted to assistant professor in the same year, but he resigned from the university and moved to Toshiba Corporation as an engineer.

He became the chief of the engineering division, and supervised the creation of an advanced vacuum tube named "Sora" in response to the Imperial Japanese Navy's request. Thereafter, he won the AIST prize.

=== After the Pacific War ===
After the Pacific War, he served as an independent company consultant, and brought the technique of statistical quality control to the industrial world of Japan. Among various other prizes, he won the Deming Prize. His findings paved the way for the rapid industrial development of Japan after the war.

After returning to Kyoto University as a professor, he held the captaincy of the Japanese Antarctica wintering party, and the chairmanship of the Japan Mountaineering Association.

Nishibori also led negotiations with the Nepal government to send a Japanese expedition to climb Manaslu. It would become the first mountain above 8000 m in height to be first summoned by Japanese climbers.

Nishibori also backed the Japanese adventurer, Naomi Uemura, and taught him how to use scientific observation equipment, sextants, and other instruments.

Nishibori died in 1989.

== Honners ==
- Deming Prize
- Order of the Rising Sun (Third grade) (1973)

== Sources ==
- Video of Eizaburō Nishibori at NHK archives
- Eizaburō Nishibori Memorial Explorer Museum
