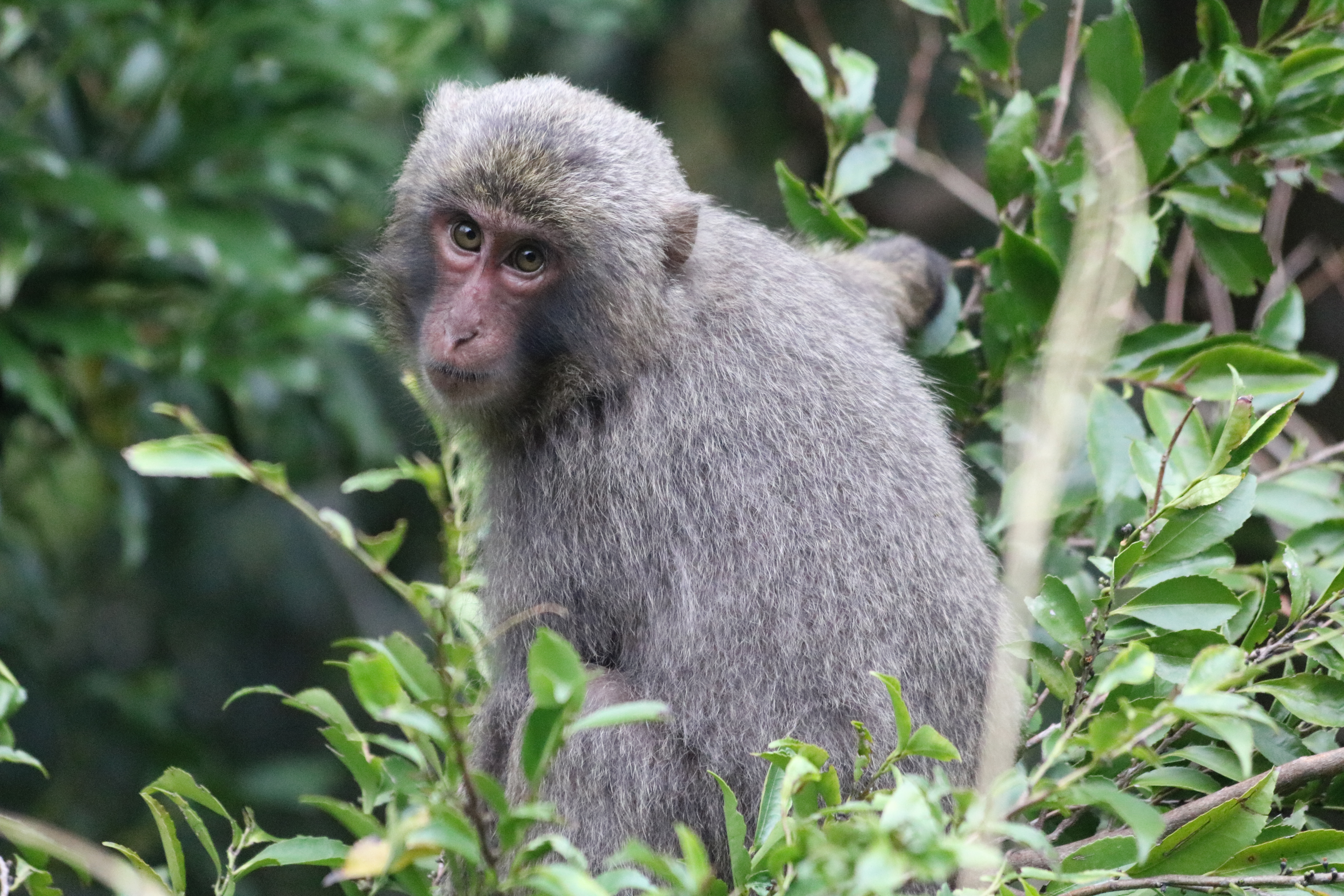

Scientific classification
- Kingdom: Animalia
- Phylum: Chordata
- Class: Mammalia
- Order: Primates
- Family: Cercopithecidae
- Genus: Macaca
- Species: M. fuscata
- Subspecies: M. f. yakui

Trinomial name
- Macaca fuscata yakui Kuroda, 1941

= Yakushima macaque =

Subspecies of Old World monkey

The Yakushima macaque (Macaca fuscata yakui) is a subspecies of Japanese macaque that is indigenous to Yakushima Island (Kagoshima Prefecture). It is also known as the Yaku macaque.

== Characteristics ==
Compared with M. f. fuscata which lives from Honshu to Shikoku and Kyushu, Japan, these individuals are smaller, stockier, have black hands and feet, and a thicker gray coat.

Adults have darker fur than infants and juveniles. Adult males have a special feature called a “momoware” (split peach) which parts their hair in the center from right to left.

Females bear a single offspring between March and May, every two years. Troop size is generally less than 50 individuals.

The Yakushima macaque population in Yakushima Island lies at the southern limit of Japanese macaque's distribution. The current population is estimated to be somewhere between 9,500–19,000 animals, according to a survey completed in 1999.

== Diet ==
The food available for the monkeys are based on certain factors such as temperature and availability. Feeding on young leaves, seeds, and flowers was affected more by availability, while feeding on fruits, mature leaves, and fallen seeds was affected more by temperature. Feeding on insects is strongly correlated with temperature, perhaps because availability of insects increased with temperature.

== Human interactions ==
In the past in Yakushima, when food supplies for macaques became short, the monkeys would encroach on human habitation and damage crops; 400–500 Yakushima macaques were caught and exterminated every year due to the damage done to the Ponkan and Tankan orange crops for which Yakushima is especially noted.

The reason may be because the monkeys' broadleaf tree habitat declined due to logging and replacement of the broadleaves with conifers. Nowadays, Yakushima residents aim to coexist by protecting their crops with electric fences, rather than exterminating the macaques.

== Protected status ==
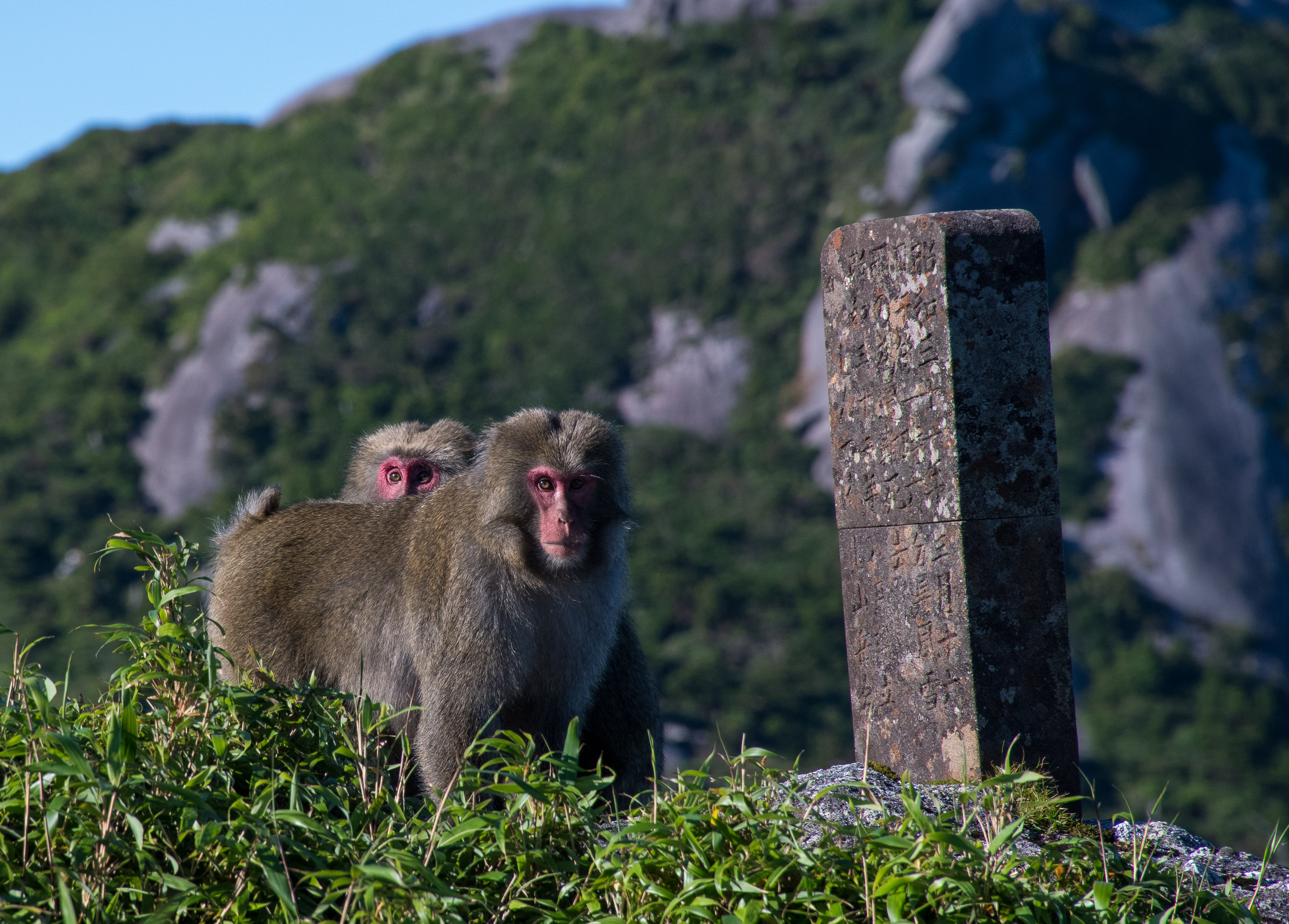
Yakushima macaques along a trail near Mount Miyanoura

According to the Ministry of the Environment's Red List of endangered species, the Yakushima macaque was judged “a rare species” in 1991 and “a quasi-endangered species” in 1998. But it was removed from the list in 2007 due to an increase in population. A species of Japanese monkey also inhabited Tanegashima, an island near Yakushima, until the 1950s, when it became extinct. Whether those monkeys were Hondo macaques or Yakushima macaques is unknown.
