= Kinji Imanishi =

Japanese ecologist and anthropologist (1902–1992)

- 今西錦司
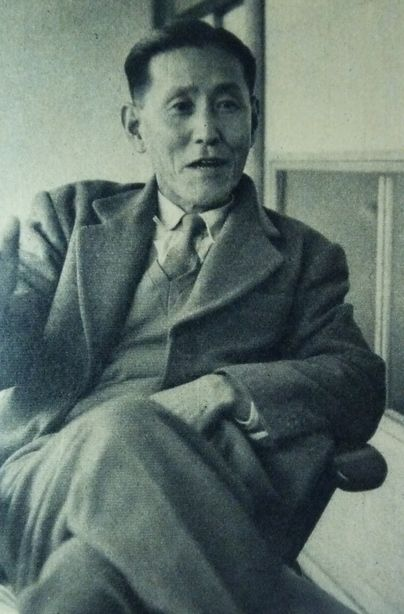
- Born: 6 January 1902; Japan Kyoto
- Died: 15 June 1992 (aged 90); Japan Kyoto
- Education: Kyoto Imperial University
- Known for: Theory of Habitat segregation Imanishi Group
- Awards: Asahi Prize; Person of Cultural Merit
- Scientific career
- Fields: ecology anthropology
- Thesis: Mayfly from the Japanese mountain streams (1939)
- Doctoral students: Junichiro Itani; Masao Kawai

Kinji Imanishi

Japanese name
- Kanji: 今西 錦司
- Hiragana: いまにしきんじ
Transcriptions
- Revised Hepburn: Imanishi Kinji
- Traditional Hepburn: Imanishi Kinji
- Kunrei-shiki: Imanisi Kinzi
- Nihon-shiki: Imanisi Kinzi

Kinji Imanishi (今西 錦司, Imanishi Kinji; January 6, 1902 – June 15, 1992) was a Japanese ecologist and anthropologist. He was the founder of Kyoto University's Primate Research Institute and, together with Junichiro Itani, is considered one of the founders of Japanese primatology.

== Biography ==
=== Early life and education ===
Kinji Imanishi was born and raised in Kyoto. He studied at the Third High School from 1920 to 1925. He joined the mountaineering club for students and made friends with Takeo Kuwabara, Eizaburo Nishibori, etc. He entered Kyoto Imperial University in April 1925. He belonged to the School of Agriculture and measured biology. After getting the BA degree, he entered graduate school at the same university.

=== As a biologist (before the Pacific War) ===
Imanishi became the special lecturer of his alma mater in March 1933. Imanishi and Kani Tokichi (可児 藤吉) were interested in the ecological difference between insects that depend on the parts of a river. They built a theory of ecological niche. In 1928, Imanishi received his Doctor of Science. The title of his doctoral dissertation was "Mayflies in Japanese Mountain Streams" (日本渓流産蜉蝣目). He joined as a member of the Mongolian expedition of Kyoto Imperial University in the same year, where he demonstrated the skill of mountaineering and survival from his high school days.

Imanishi was appointed researcher at the Institute for Life Sciences of Asia, under the jurisdiction of East Asia Development Board, in 1929. As a researcher, he traveled in the Pohnpei islands for research. Next, he went on an expedition to the northern area of Greater Khingan in May 1941 (until July 1941). When the Northwest Research Institute was established in Spring 1944, he assumed the role of president.

=== After the war ===
Imanishi went back to being a lecturer at Kyoto University, School of Agriculture. He belonged to the Kyoto University Research Centre for the Cultural Sciences from August 1950. He led the Manaslu expedition in 1952. Next, he led the scientific expedition to the Karakoram-Hindu Kush from 1955.

In 1956, he built the Japan Monkey Centre at Inuyama, which is a zoological garden of primates (The Primate Research Institute of Kyoto University is on the southern side.) He was promoted to professor of the Kyoto University Research Centre for the Cultural Sciences in 1959. He was the chief of the Research team of Hominidae in three expeditions: 1961, 1963, and 1964. He retired from Kyoto University in 1965.

After his retirement from Kyoto University, he was a professor at Okayama University (May 1965-May 1966). From June 1966, he served as the fourth principal of Gifu University (until June 1973). Kinji's long-cherished desire attained in 1967, Primate Research Institute was founded in 1967.

He loved mountain climbing all his life and was the chairman of the Japanese Alpine Club from 1973 to 1976.

== Contribution of research ==
Imanishi and his students did foundational research on the behavior and social life of semi-wild horses and, later, macaques, identifying individuals and making detailed observations on them over generations. He was a pioneer in advocating for the study of animals in their natural environment. His work led to important insights into animal culture. Imanishi introduced the Japanese term kaluchua, which was later translated by Masao Kawai and others to refer to socially learned behaviors as "pre-culture".

Imanishi opposed the laboratory study of animals, which he saw as a Western method. He emphasized the dynamics of animal societies and considered Western lab studies "static."

In 1957, Imanishi founded the journal Primates, the oldest and longest-running international primatology journal in the world.

Imanishi's concept of species society is central to his views of the interconnectedness of things in nature. The world of species has been viewed as a social phenomenon, in which various individuals are continually contributing to the maintenance and perpetuation of the species society to which they belong.

== Honours ==
- Asahi Prize (1968)
- Person of Cultural Merit (3 November 1972)
- Order of Culture (3 November 1979)
- Grand Cordon of the Order of the Sacred Treasure
  - (Second Class: 29 April 1972)
  - (15 June 1992; posthumous)

== Publications ==
His works were compiled as "complete works of Kinji Imanishi" 今西錦司全集(thirteen-volumes).

=== Books (Japanese) ===
- "The World of Living Things" 生物の世界 (Koubundō弘文堂, 1941)
- "Building of the human societies" 人間社会の形成" (NHK Publishing, Inc., 1966)
- "My contemplation to theory of evolution" 私の進化論 (NHK Publishing, Inc., 1970)
- "Subjective evolution" 主体性の進化論 (Chuokoron-Shinsha, 1980)

=== Translated book ===
- The World of Living Things (Routledge, 2002) ISBN 0-7007-1632-7
- Comment la nature fait science: Entretiens, souvenirs et intuitions (2023), in French. ISBN 978-2-381140-353.

=== Interview ===
- NHK archives: Imanishi Kinji(1902–1992) Live as pioneer

== Reference about Kinji Imanishi ==
- "Kinji Imanishi and 60 years of Japanese primatology" Current Biology Vol. 18 (14). Tetsuro Matsuzawa, William C. McGrew, 2008.
