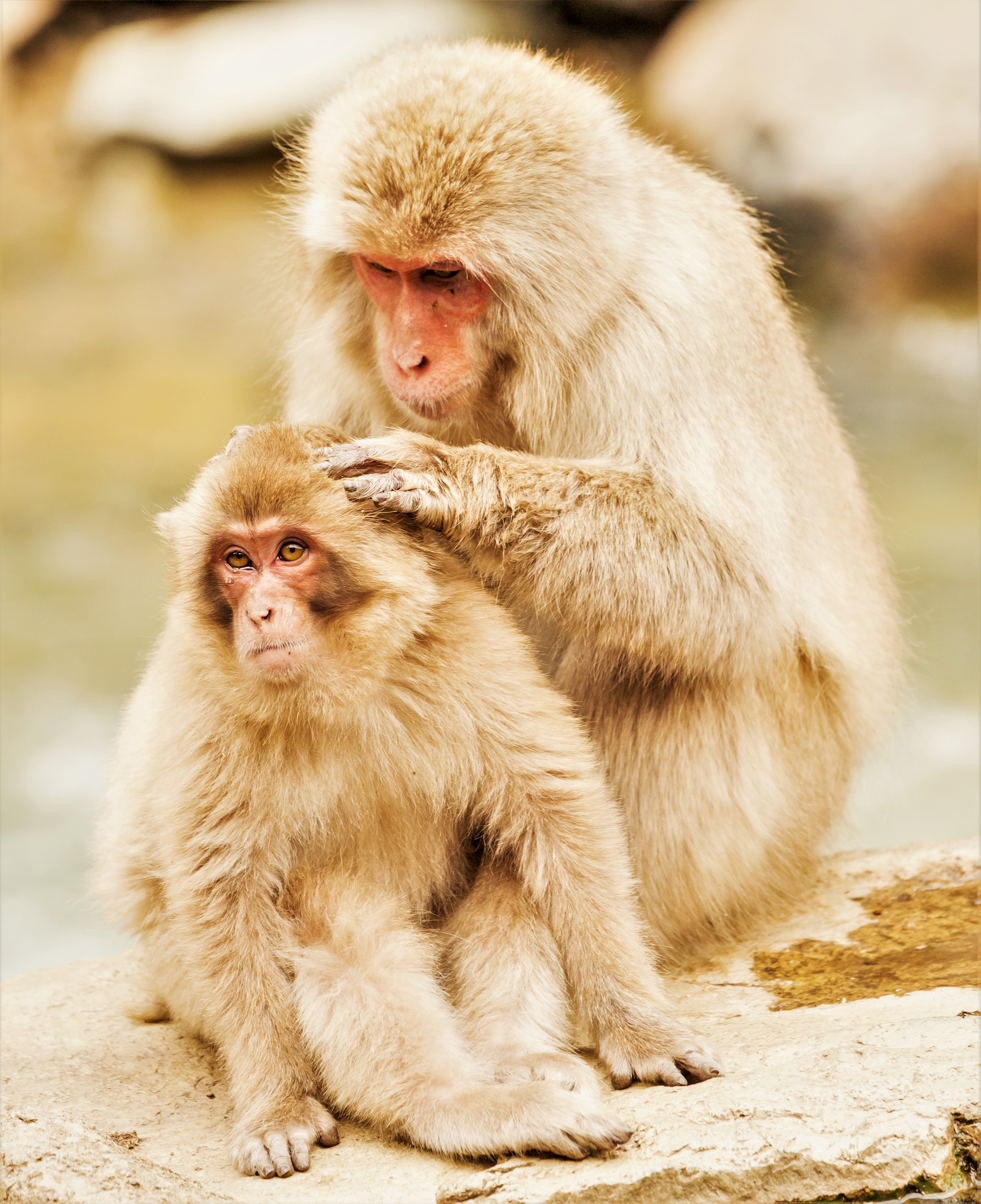
- A mother grooming her child

Conservation status
- Least Concern (IUCN 3.1)

Scientific classification
- Kingdom: Animalia
- Phylum: Chordata
- Class: Mammalia
- Order: Primates
- Family: Cercopithecidae
- Genus: Macaca
- Species: M. fuscata

Binomial name
- Macaca fuscata Blyth, 1875

Subspecies
- Macaca fuscata fuscata Macaca fuscata yakui
- Japanese macaque range

= Japanese macaque =

Species of Old World monkey

The Japanese macaque (Macaca fuscata), also known as the snow monkey, is a terrestrial Old World monkey species that is native to Japan. Colloquially, this macaque is referred to as the "snow monkey", because some live in areas where snow covers the ground for months each year. No other non-human primate lives farther north, nor in a colder climate. It has brownish grey fur, a pinkish-red face, and a short tail. Two subspecies are known.

In Japan, the species is known as Nihonzaru (ニホンザル・日本猿; Japanese pronunciation: [ɲ̟ì.hó̞ń.d͡zä́.ɾɯ̈̀] lit. 'Japanese monkey') to distinguish it from other primates, but the Japanese macaque is very familiar in Japan—as it is the only native species of monkey in Japan—so when Japanese people simply say saru (サル・猿; [sä́.ɾɯ̈̀]), they usually have the Japanese macaque in mind.

== Physical characteristics ==
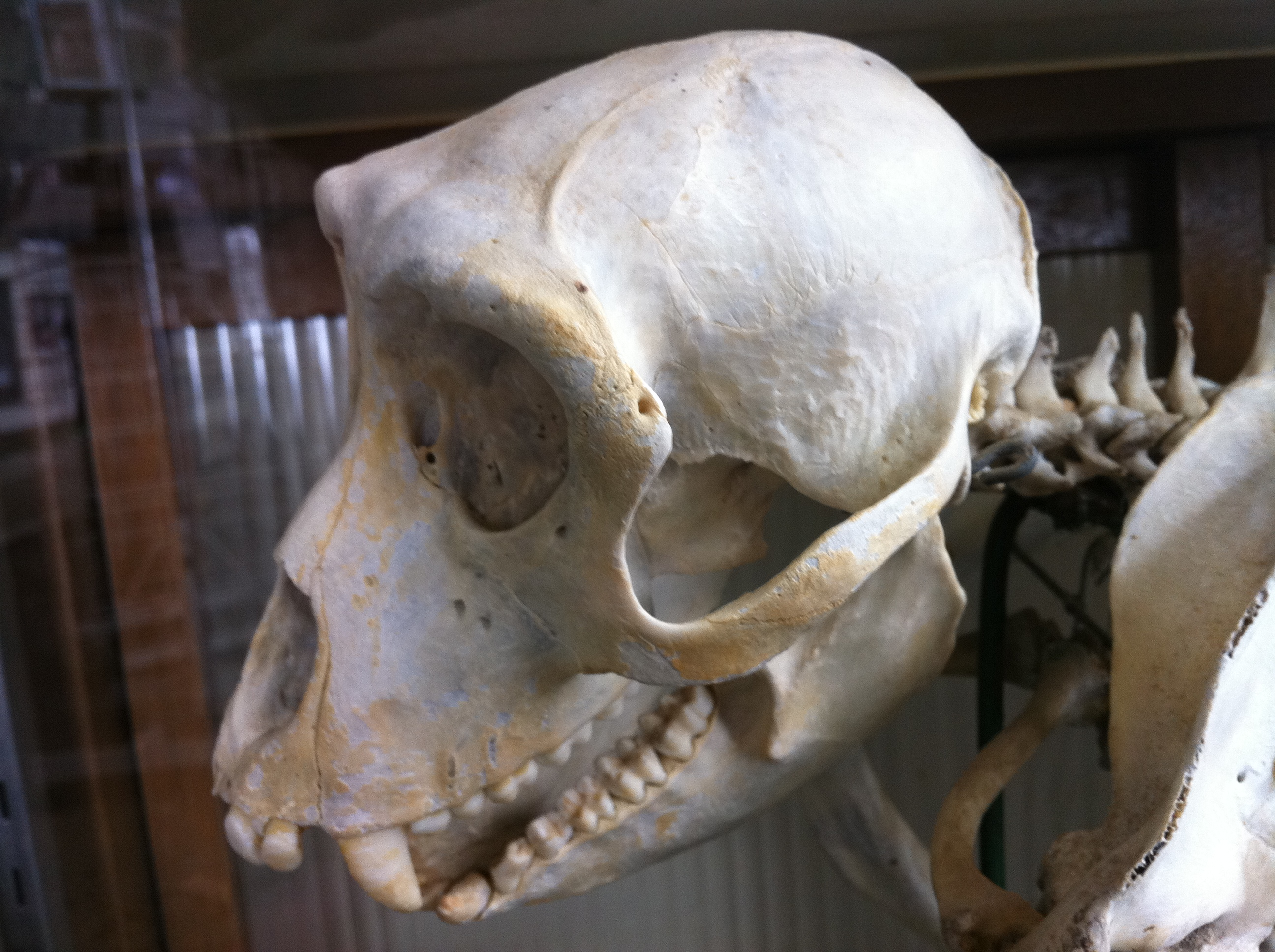
Skull

The Japanese macaque is sexually dimorphic. Males weigh on average 11.3 kg (25 lb), while females average 8.4 kg (19 lb). Macaques from colder areas tend to weigh more than ones from warmer areas. The average height for males is 57.0 cm (22.4 in), while the average female height is 52.3 cm (20.6 in). The weight of their brain is approximately 95 g (3.4 oz). Japanese macaques have short stumps for tails that average 92.5 mm (3.64 in) in males and 79.1 mm (3.11 in) in females. The macaque has a pinkish face and posterior. The rest of its body is covered in brown or greyish hair. The coat of the macaque is well-adapted to the cold and its thickness increases as temperatures decrease. The macaque can cope with temperatures as low as −20 °C (−4 °F). Japanese macaques are strong swimmers and have been reported swimming distances of over half a kilometer.

Macaques mostly move on all fours. They are semiterrestrial, with females spending more time in the trees and males spending more time on the ground. Macaques are known to leap. The lifespan of Japanese macaques is up to 32 years for females and up to 28 years for males, which is high when compared to what typically is seen in other macaque species.

== Behavior ==
=== Group structure ===
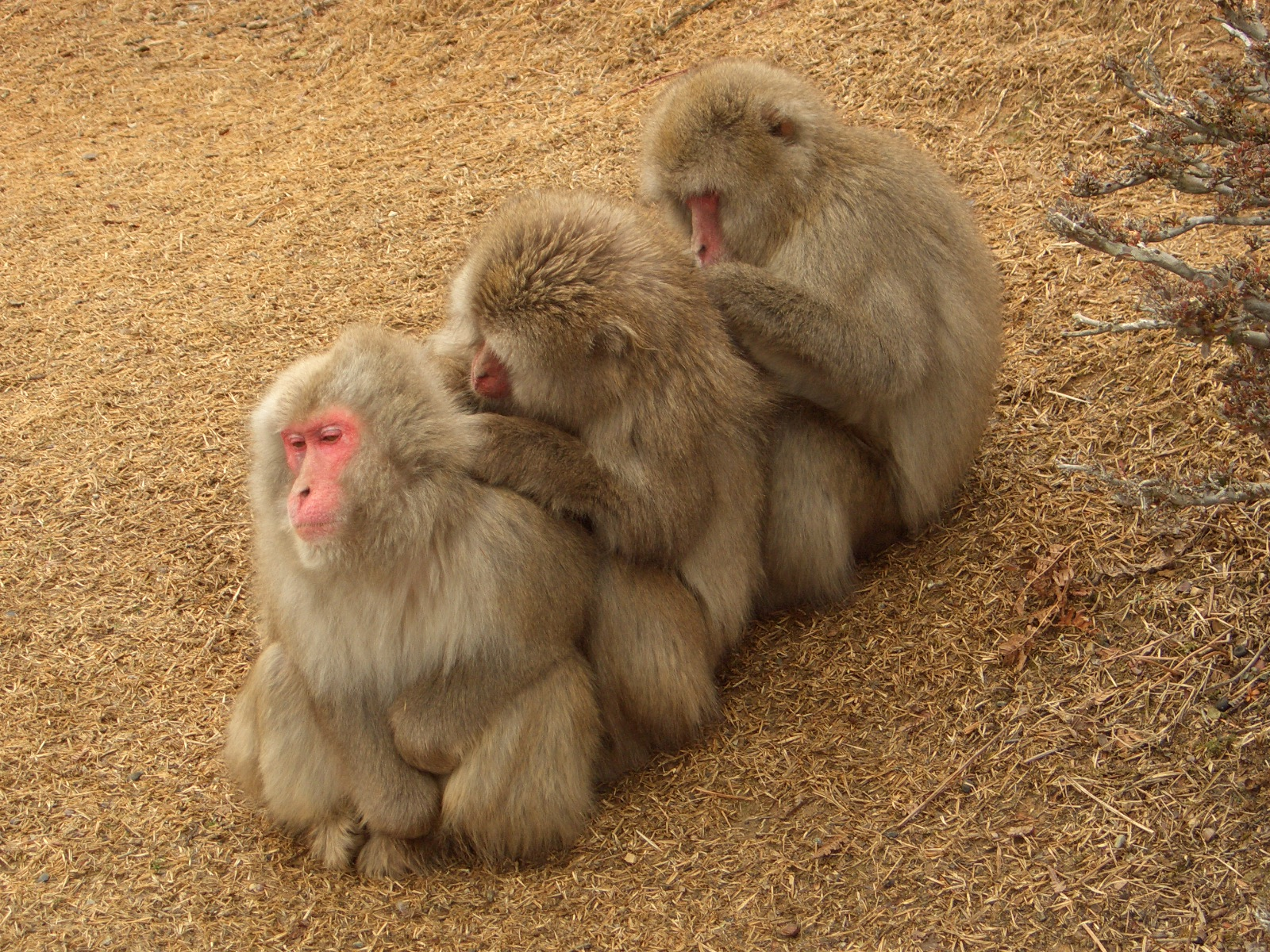
Grooming

Japanese macaques live in matrilineal societies, and females stay in their natal groups for life, while males move out before they are sexually mature. Macaque groups tend to contain adults of both sexes. In addition, a Japanese macaque troop contains several matrilines. These matrilines may exist in a dominance hierarchy with all members of a specific group ranking over members of a lower-ranking group. Temporary all-male groups also exist, composed of those who have recently left their natal groups and are about to transfer to another group. However, many males spend ample time away from any group, and may leave and join several groups.

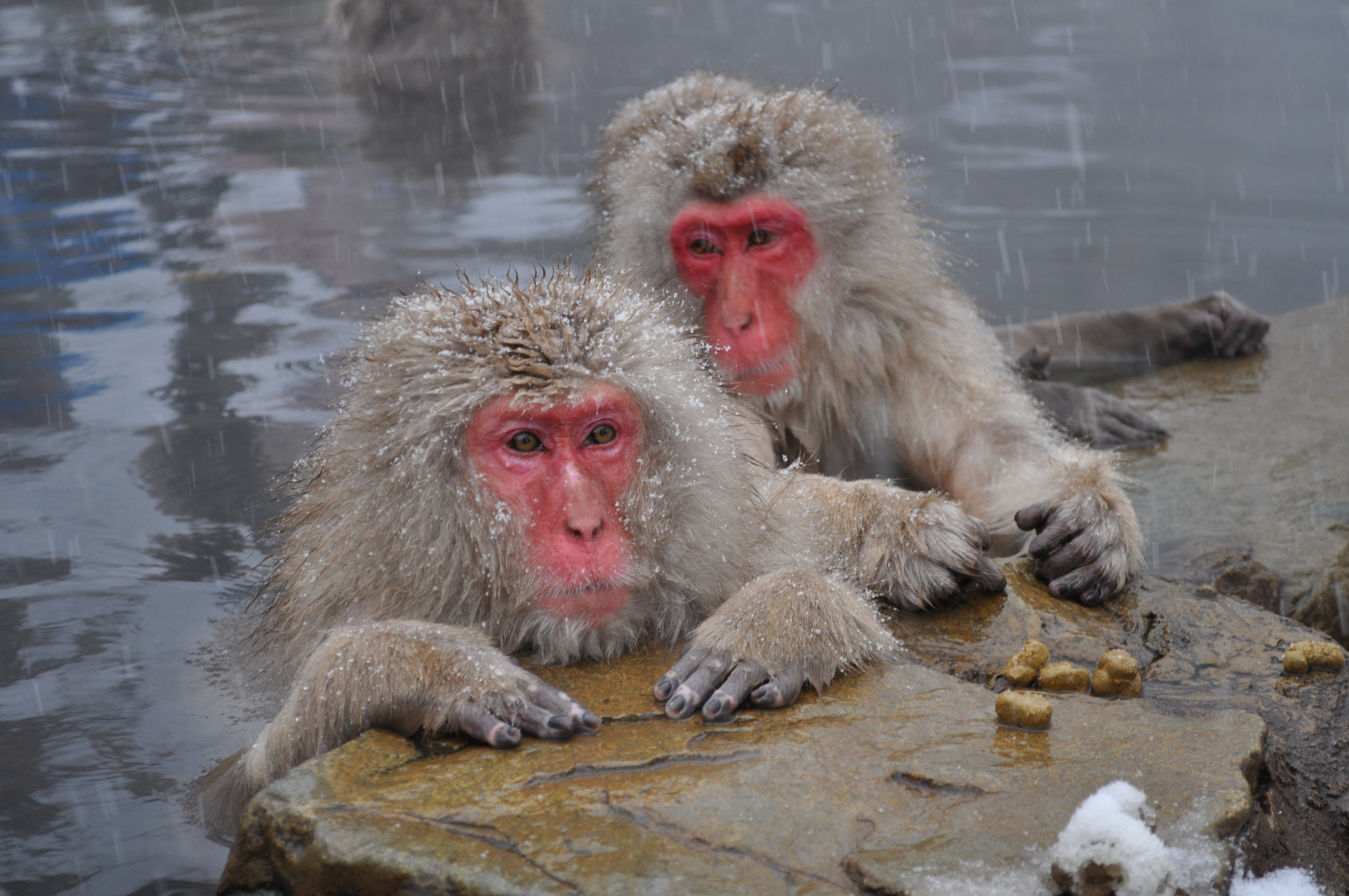
At Jigokudani Hotspring in Nagano

Jigokudani

Females of the troop exist in a stable dominance hierarchy and a female's rank depends on that of her mother. Younger females tend to rank higher than their older siblings. Higher-ranking matrilines have greater social cohesion. Strong relationships with dominant females can allow dominant males to retain their rank when they otherwise would not. Males within a group normally have a dominance hierarchy, with one male having alpha status. The dominance status of male macaques usually changes when a former alpha male leaves or dies. Other ways in which status of male hierarchy changes, is when an alpha male loses his rank or when a troop splits, leaving a new alpha male position open. The longer a male is in a troop, the higher his status is likely to be.

Females typically maintain both social relationships and hygiene through grooming. Grooming occurs regardless of climate or season. Females who are matrilineally related groom each other more often than unrelated individuals. Females will groom unrelated females to maintain group cohesion and social relationships between different kinships in a troop. Nevertheless, a female will only groom a limited number of other females, even if the group expands. Females will groom males, usually for hygienic purposes, but that behavior also may serve to attract dominant males to the group. Mothers pass their grooming techniques to their offspring, most probably through social rather than genetic means, as a cultural characteristic.

==== Documented female troop leadership ====
Yakei is a female who rose to leadership of her troop at Takasakiyama Natural Zoological Garden in 2021. Her troop consists of 677 Japanese macaque monkeys who live in a sanctuary that was established in 1952 at the zoological garden. At age nine, she overthrew the dominant males in her troop and displaced her high-ranking mother as well. She became the first female leader of the troop during its recorded history of 70 years. Yakei has retained her leadership position through her first breeding season that had been thought to be a time when she might have been challenged successfully. Both scientific and popular interest is leading to extensive coverage of Yakei's behavior.

=== Mating and parenting ===
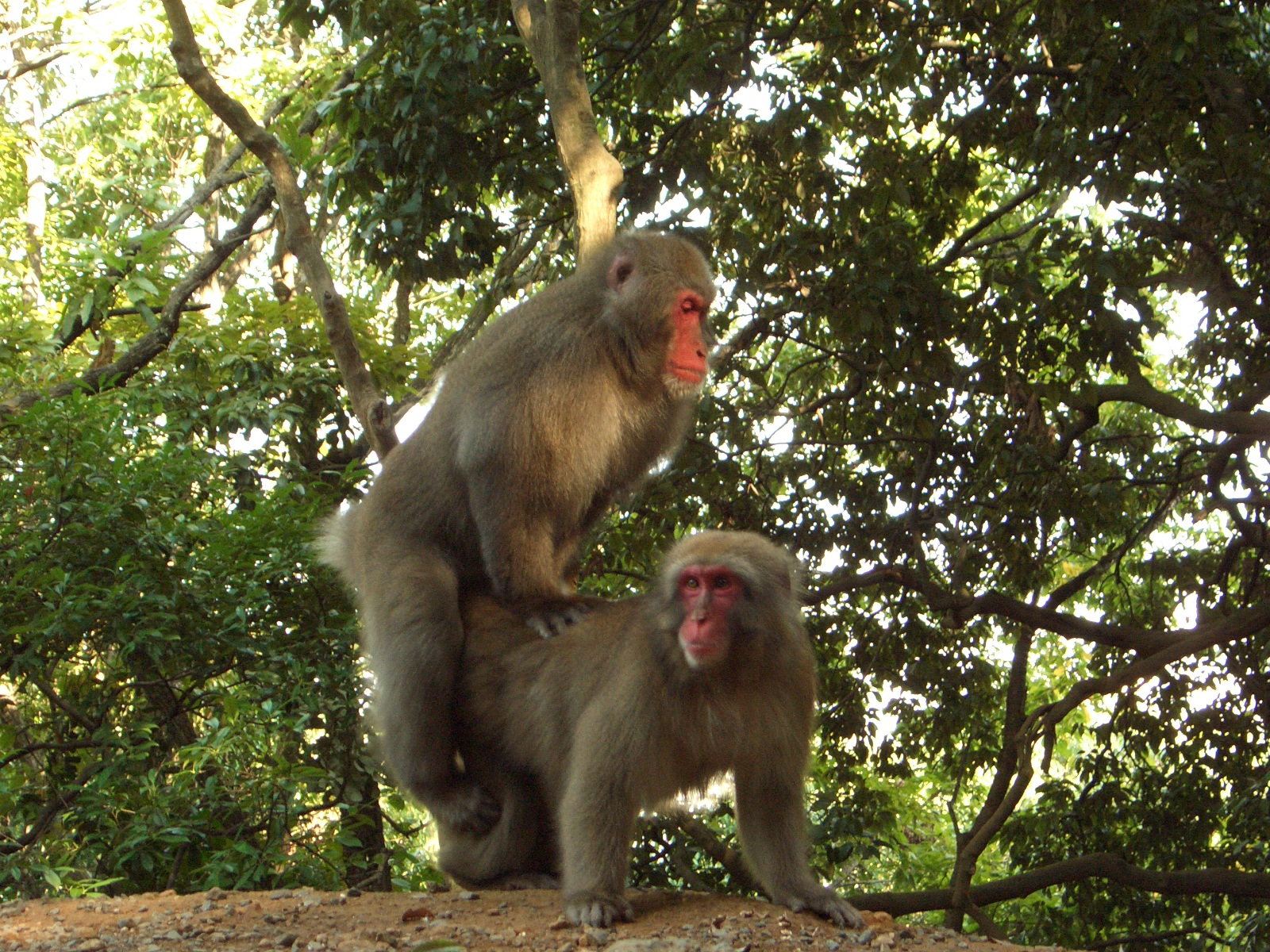
Mating

A male and female macaque form a pair bond and mate, feed, rest, and travel together during the mating season, and on average, this relationship typically lasts 16 days. Females enter into consortships with an average of four males a season. Higher-ranking males have longer consortships than their subordinates. In addition, higher-ranking males try to disrupt consortships of lower-ranking males. Females may choose to mate with males of any rank. However, dominant males mate more frequently than others, as they are more successful in mate guarding. The female decides whether mating takes place. In addition, a dominant position does not mean a male will successfully mate with a female. Males may join other troops temporarily during the mating season and mate with those females.

During the mating season, the face and genitalia of males redden and their tails stand erect, and the faces and anogenital regions of females turn scarlet. Macaques copulate both on the ground and in the trees. Roughly one in three copulations leads to orgasm in females. Macaques signal when they are ready to mate by looking backward over a shoulder, staying still, or walking backward toward their potential partner. A female emits a "squawk", a "squeak", or produces an atonal "cackle" during copulation. Males have no copulatory vocalizations.

Females engage in same-sex mounting unrelated to the mating season and therefore, are mounted more often by other females than by males. This behavior has led to proposals in literature that female Japanese macaques are generally bisexual, rather than preferentially homo- or heterosexual.

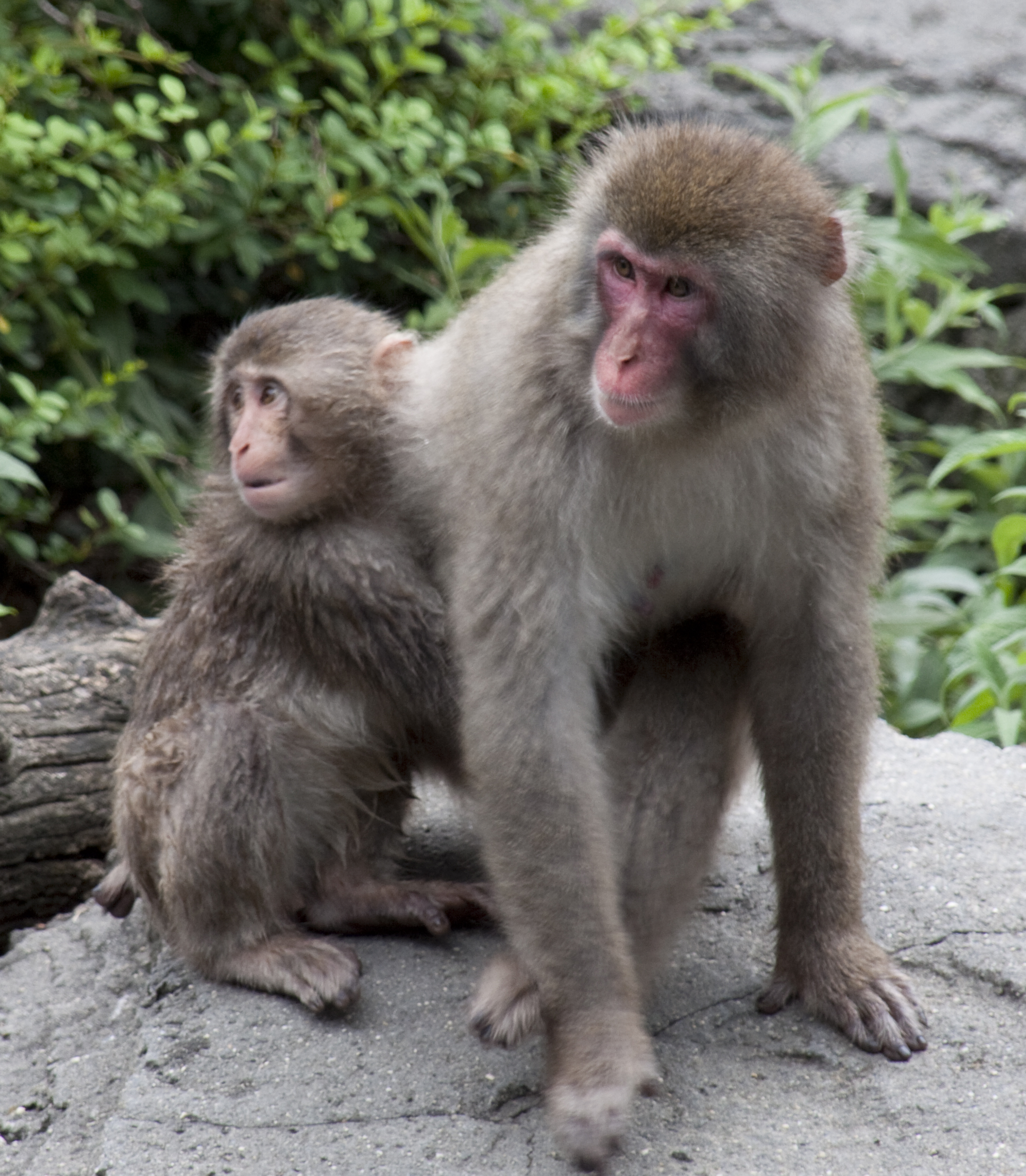
Mother with infant

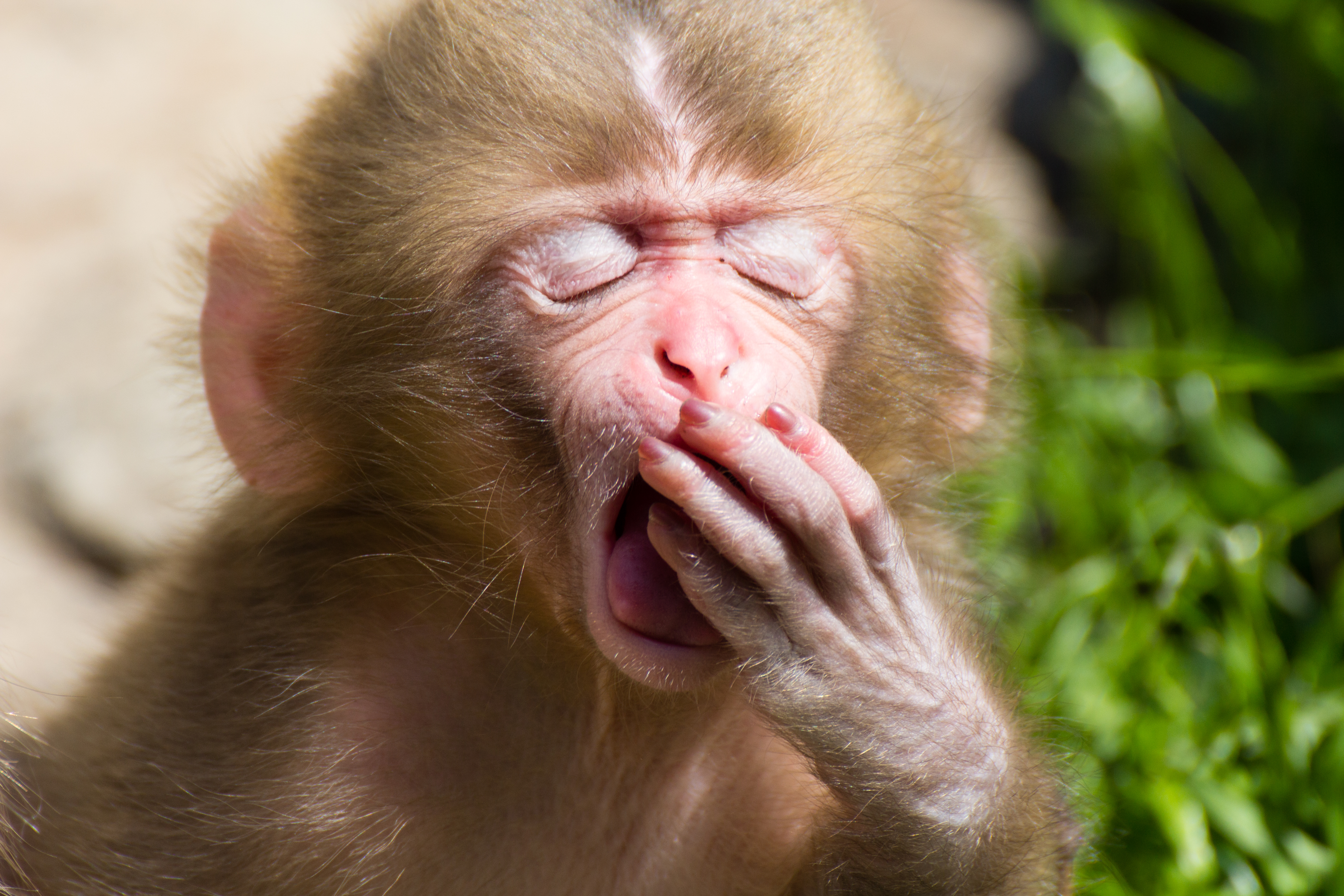
Juvenile yawning

A macaque mother moves to the periphery of her troop to give birth in a secluded spot, unless the group is moving, when the female must stay with it. Macaques usually give birth on the ground. Infants are born with dark-brown hair. A mother and her infant tend to avoid other troop members. The infants consume their first solid food at five to six weeks old, and by seven weeks, can forage independently from their mothers. A mother carries her infant on her belly for its first four weeks. After this time, the mother carries her infant on her back, as well. Infants continue to be carried past a year. The mother may socialize again very slowly. However, alloparenting has been observed, usually by females who have not had infants of their own. Male care of infants occurs in some groups, but not in others; when they do, usually, older males protect, groom, and carry an infant as a female would.

Infants have fully developed their locomotive abilities within three to four months. When an infant is seven months old, its mother discourages suckling; full weaning happens by its eighteenth month.

In some populations, male infants tend to play in larger groups more often than females. However, female infants have more social interaction than their male counterparts, and female infants will associate with individuals of all ages and sexes. When males are two years old, they prefer to associate with other males around the same age.

=== Communication ===
During feeding or moving, Japanese macaques often emit sounds that are called "coos". These vocalizations most likely serve to keep the troop together and strengthen social relations among females. Macaques usually respond to coos with coos of their own. Coos also are uttered before grooming along with vocalizations identified as "girney" calls. Variants of the "girney" calls are made in different contexts. This call also serves as appeasement between individuals in aggressive encounters. Macaques have alarm calls for alerting to danger and other calls to signal estrus that sound similar to danger alerts. Threat calls are heard during aggressive encounters and are often uttered by supporters of those involved in antagonistic interactions. The individual being supported supports those callers in the future.

=== Intelligence and culture ===
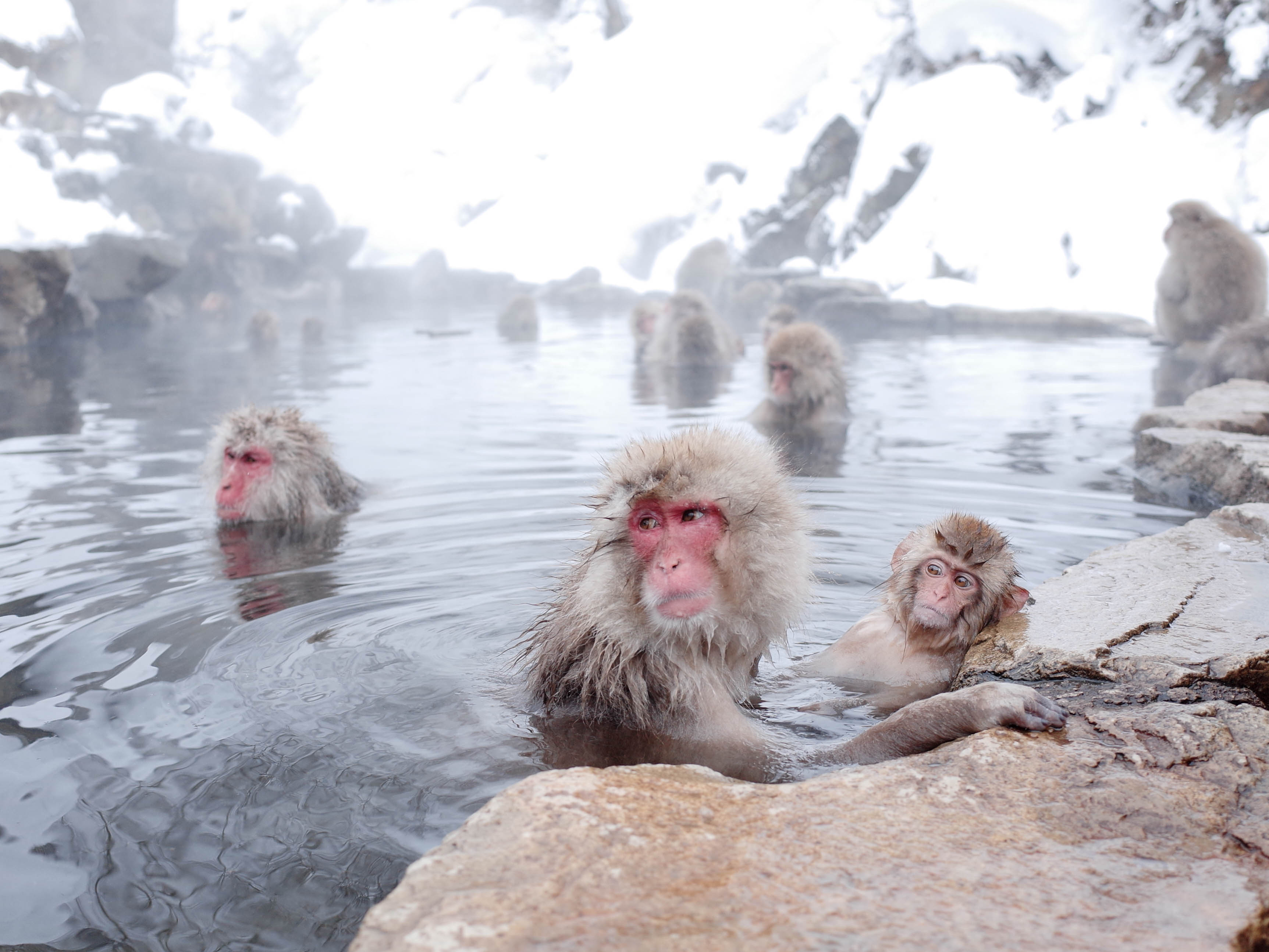
Macaques at a hot spring

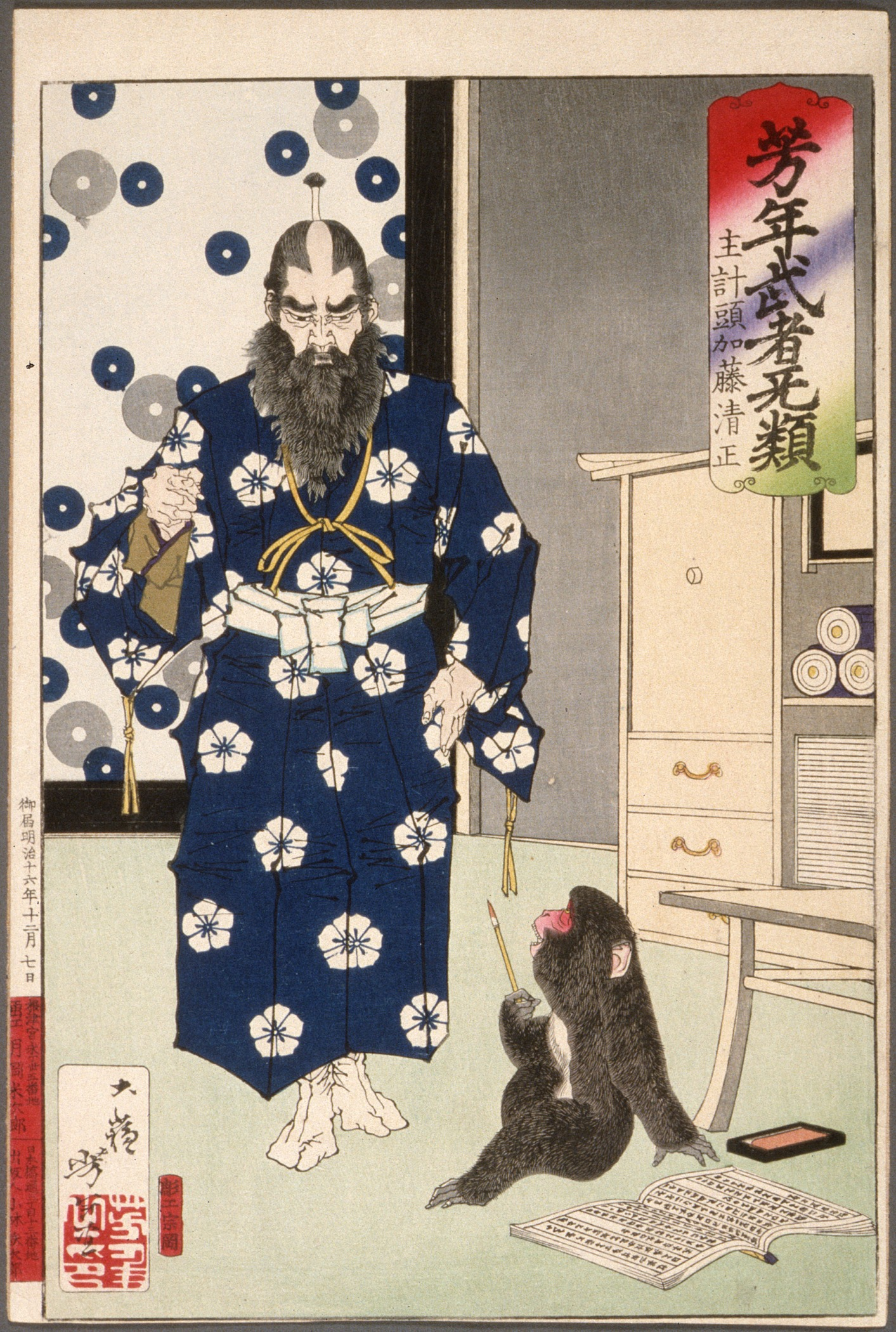
The famous Japanese warrior Kato Kiyomasa was depicted with his macaque who holds a writing brush, by Tsukioka Yoshitoshi (1883).

The Japanese macaque is an intelligent species. Researchers studying this species at Koshima Island in Japan left sweet potatoes out on the beach for them to eat, then witnessed one female, named Imo (Japanese for yam or potato), washing the food off with river water rather than brushing it off as the others were doing, and later even dipping her clean food into salty seawater. After a while, other members of her troop started to copy her behavior. This trait was then passed on from generation to generation, until eventually all except the oldest members of the troop were washing their food and even seasoning it in the sea. Similarly, she was the first observed balling up wheat with air pockets and soil, throwing it all into the water, and waiting for the wheat to float back up free from the soil to consume it. An altered misaccount of this incident is the basis for the "hundredth monkey" effect. That behavior also spread among her troop members.

The macaque has other unusual behaviours, including bathing together in hot springs and rolling snowballs for fun. In winter, the bathing is associated with lower levels of stress, with the higher ranking females dominating the restricted resource to compensate for the higher rates of stress outside of the spring. Also, in recent studies, the Japanese macaque has been found to develop different accents, similar to human cultures. Macaques in areas separated by only a few hundred miles may have very different pitches in their calls, their form of communication. The Japanese macaque has been involved in many studies concerning neuroscience and also is used in drug testing.

== Ecology ==
The Japanese macaque is diurnal. In colder areas, from autumn to early winter, macaques feed in between different activities. In the winter, macaques have two to four feeding bouts each day, with fewer daily activities. In the spring and summer, they have two or three bouts of feeding daily. In warmer areas such as Yakushima, daily activities are more varied. The typical day for a macaque is 20.9% inactive, 22.8% traveling, 23.5% feeding, 27.9% social grooming, 1.2% self-grooming, and 3.7% other activities. Macaques usually sleep in trees, but they also sleep on the ground, as well as on or near rocks and fallen trees. During the winter, macaques huddle together for warmth on sleeping grounds. Macaques at Jigokudani Monkey Park are notable for visiting the hot springs in the winter to warm up after being encouraged to concentrate there in the 1960s, part of a plan to reduce local crop damage from foraging.

=== Diet ===
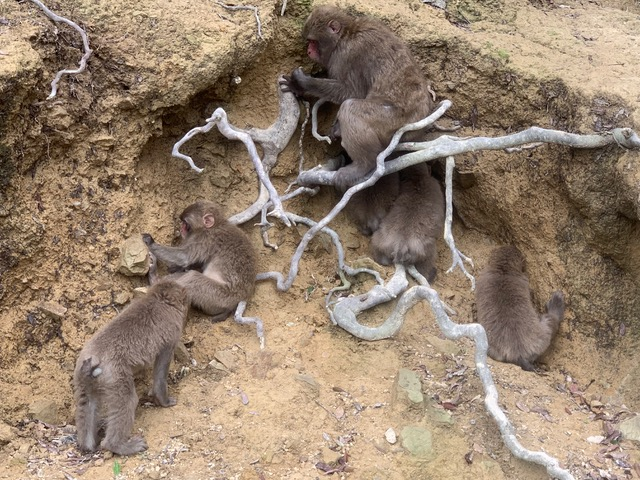
Eating soil near the Awajishima Monkey Center on Awaji Island, Japan

The Japanese macaque is omnivorous and eats a variety of foods. More than 213 species of plants are included in the macaque's diet. They also eat insects, bark, and soil, as well as flowers and some nectar. On Yakushima Island, fruit, mature leaves, and fallen seeds are primarily eaten. The macaque also eats fungi, ferns, invertebrates, and other parts of plants. In addition, in Yakushima, their diets vary seasonally with fruits being eaten in the summer and herbs being eaten in the winter. Farther north, macaques mostly eat seasonal foods such as fruit and nuts to store fat for the winter, when food is scarce. On the northern island of Kinkasan, macaques mostly eat fallen seeds, herbs, young leaves, and fruits, especially of the Japanese barberry (Berberis thunbergii) and Japanese zelkova (Zelkova serrata). When preferred food items are not available, macaques dig up underground plant parts (roots or rhizomes) or eat soil and fish.

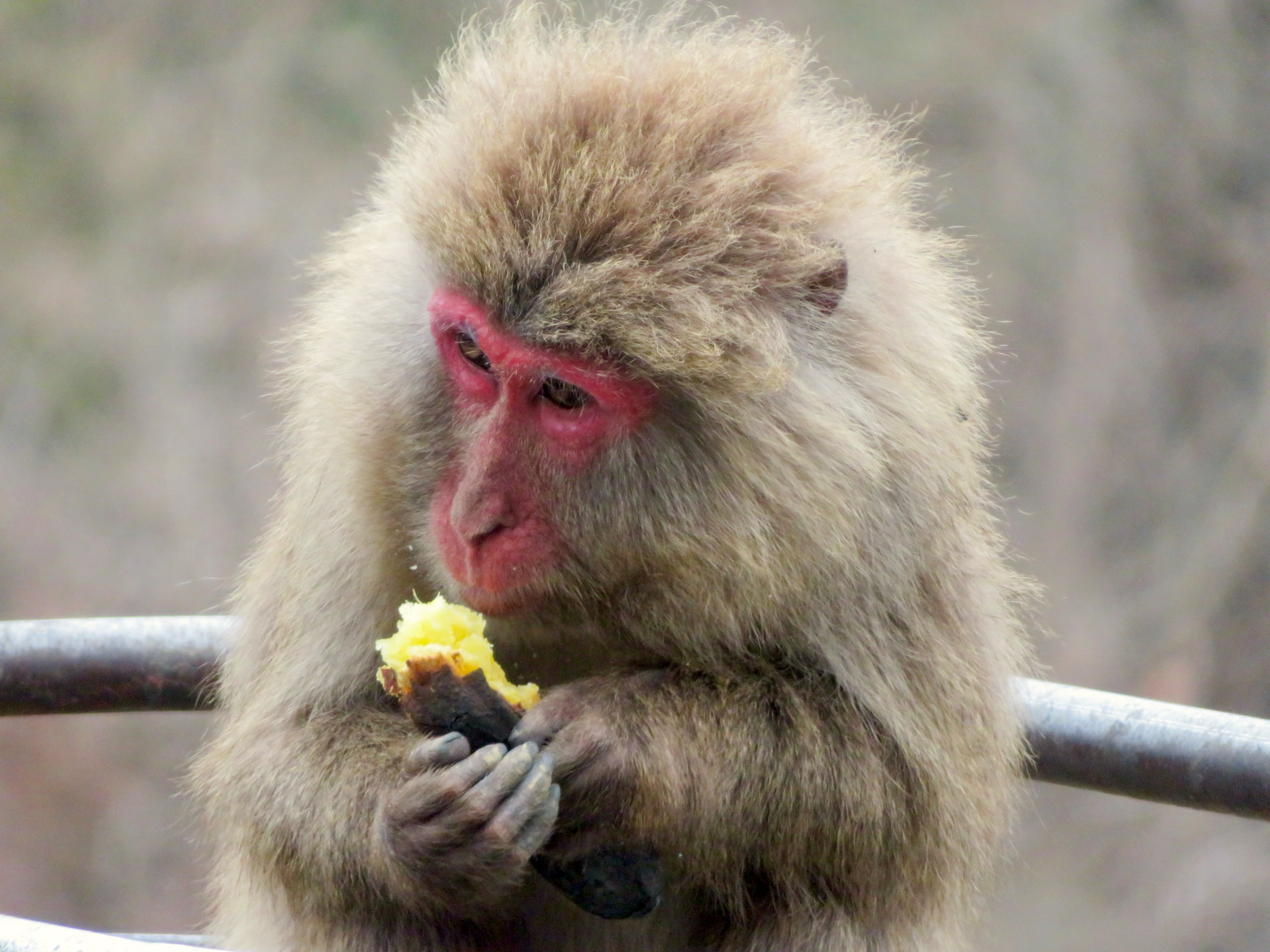
Eating yakiimo

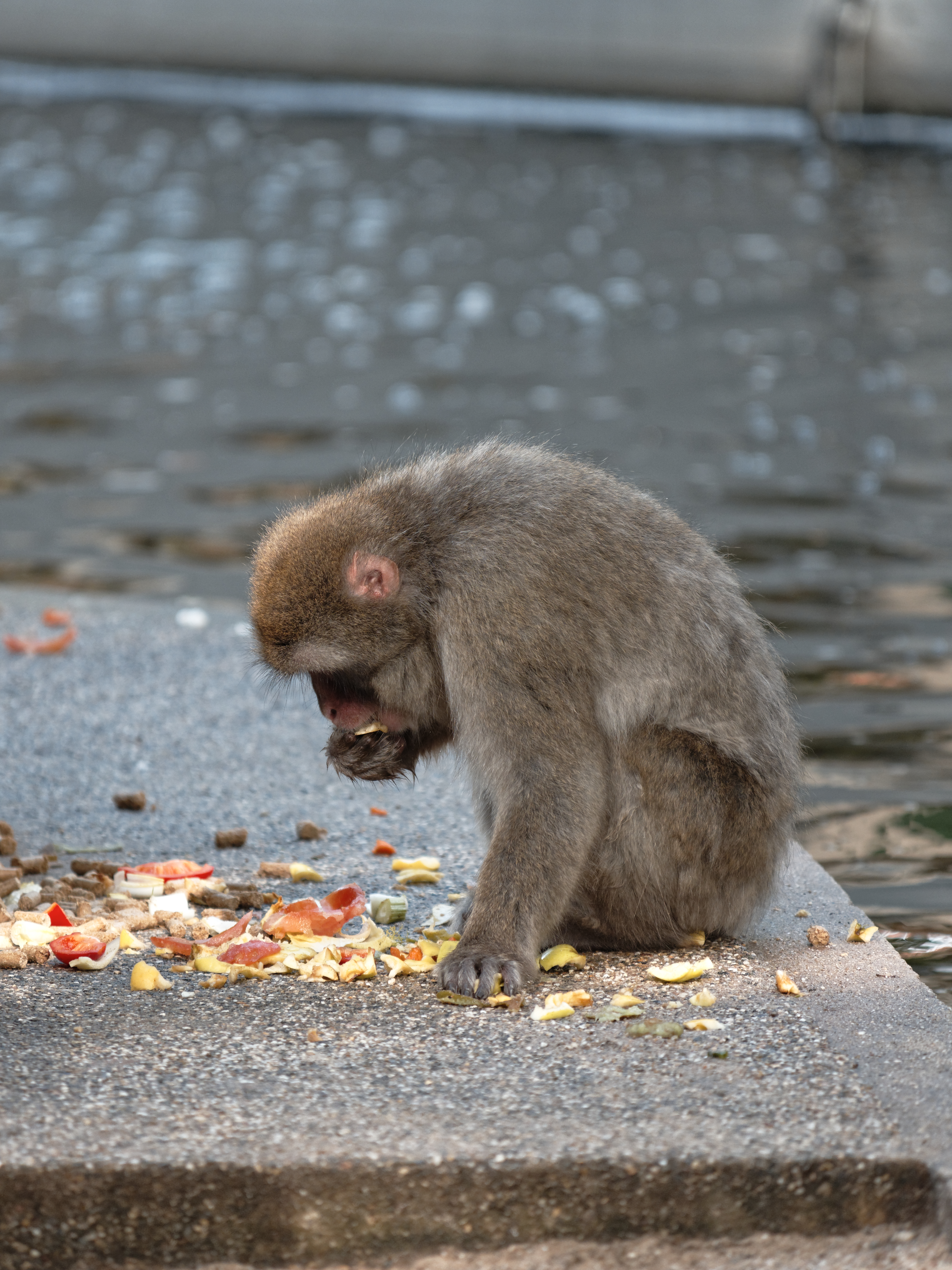
Eating various fruits and vegetables

== Distribution and habitat ==
The Japanese macaque is the northernmost-living non-human primate. It is found on three of the four main Japanese islands, south of the Blakiston's Line: Honshu, Shikoku, and Kyushu. The northernmost populations live on the Shimokita Peninsula, the northernmost point of Honshu. Several of Japan's smaller islands are inhabited by macaques as well. The southernmost population living on Yakushima Island is a subspecies of the mainland macaques, M. fuscata yakui. A study in 1989 estimated the total population of wild Japanese macaques to be 114,431 individuals.

The Japanese macaque lives in a variety of habitats. It inhabits subtropical forests in the southern part of its range and subarctic forests in mountainous areas in the northern part of its range. It can be found in both warm and cool forests, such as the deciduous forests of central and northern Japan and the broadleaf evergreen forests in the southwest of the islands. Warm temperate evergreen and broadleaf forests and cool temperate deciduous broadleaf forests are the most important habitats for macaques.

=== North America ===
In 1972, a troop of approximately 150 Japanese macaques were relocated from Kyoto to a primate observatory in southwest Texas, US. The observatory is an enclosed ranch-style environment and the macaques have been allowed to roam with minimal human interference. At first, many perished in the unfamiliar habitat, which consists of arid brushland. The macaques eventually adapted to the environment, learned to avoid predators (such as eagles, coyotes, and rattlesnakes), and they learned to forage for mesquite beans, cactus fruits, and other foods. The surviving macaques flourished, and by 1995, the troop consisted of 500 to 600 individuals. In 1996, hunters maimed or killed four escaped macaques; as a result, legal restrictions were publicly clarified and funds were raised to establish a 186-acre (75 ha) sanctuary near Dilley, Texas. In 1999, the Animal Protection Institute took over management of the sanctuary and began to rescue other species of primates. As of 2017, the troop cohabitated with six other species of macaque.

== Relationship with humans ==
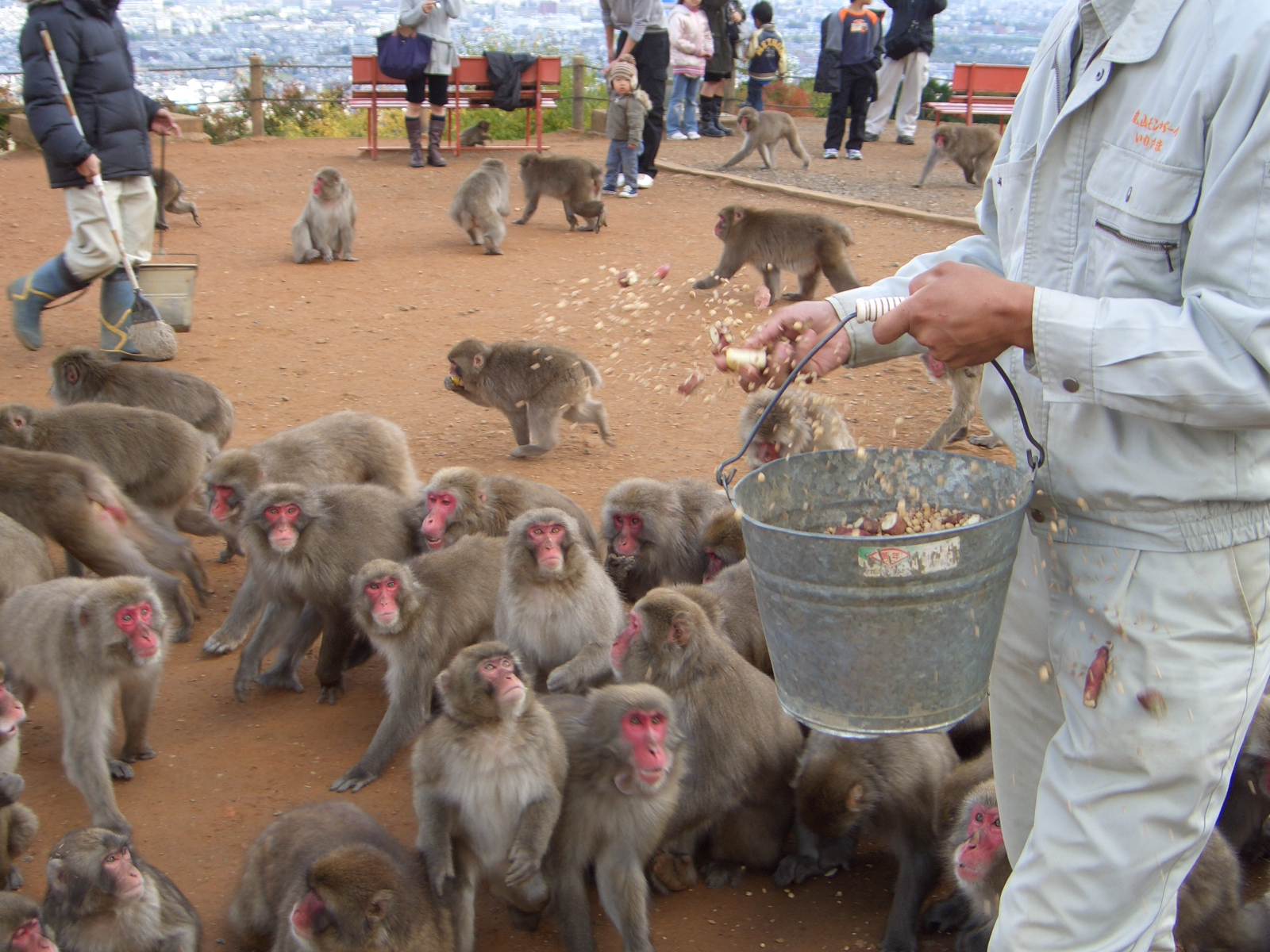
Gathering for yakiimo (sweet potato) being handed out by an attendant at the Iwatayama Monkey Park

Traditional human behaviors that are threats to macaques have been slash-and-burn agriculture, use of forest woods for construction and fuel, and hunting. Since World War II, these threats have declined due to social and economic changes in Japan, including the prohibition of macaque hunting in 1947. New threats have emerged, in particular the replacement of natural forests with lumber plantations.

Protection for the macaques, increased afforestation, and the human-caused extinction of their natural predators the Japanese wolf, have led to the macaque population growing heavily since the 1940s. Because of this, and land-use changes increasing the proximity of agriculture to the macaques' range, they have become a major agricultural pest; they can climb over regular fences and quickly realise that deterrents such as scarecrows do not pose an actual threat, so methods such as electric fences must be used. In 2019, the cost of agricultural damage caused by macaques was around 900 million yen. Over 20,000 macaques are culled each year in an attempt to reduce agricultural damage, and there are concerns that this culling is reducing the macaques' range.

Macaques have often entered urban areas, with one macaque recorded living in central Tokyo for several months. In 2022 the city of Yamaguchi experienced aggression from the monkeys with at least 50 people attacked.

=== Cultural depictions ===
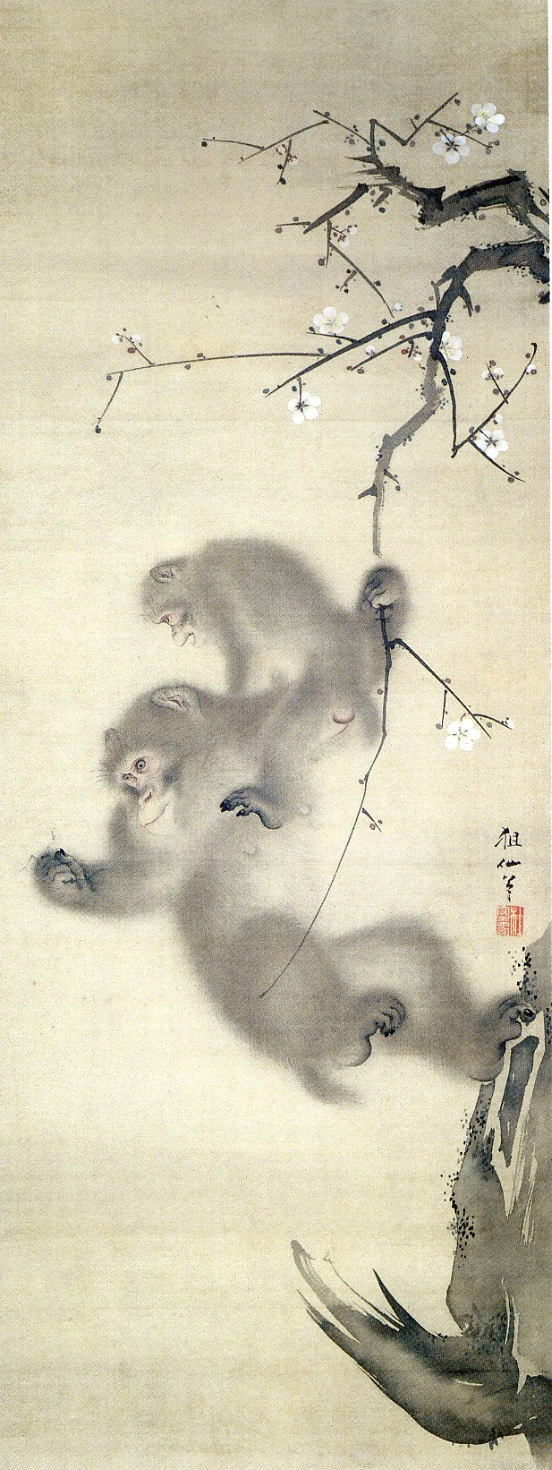
Monkeys in a Plum Tree, Mori Sosen, 1808

The Japanese macaque has featured prominently in the religion, folklore, and art of Japan, as well as in proverbs and idiomatic expressions in the Japanese language.

In Shinto belief, mythical beasts known as raijū sometimes appeared as monkeys and kept Raijin, the god of lightning, company. The "three wise monkeys", who warn people to "see no evil, hear no evil and speak no evil", are carved in relief over the door of the famous Tōshō-gū shrine in Nikkō.

The Japanese macaque is a feature of several fairy tales, such as the tale of Momotarō and the fable about The Crab and the Monkey.

The monkey is part of the Chinese zodiac. That zodiac has been used for centuries in Japan and led to many representations of the macaque for that figure.

The creature was sometimes portrayed in paintings of the rich cultural epoch, the Edo period that flourished from 1603 to 1867, as a tangible metaphor for a particular year. The early nineteenth-century artist and samurai, Watanabe Kazan (1793–1841), created a painting of a macaque. The last great master of the ukiyo-e genre of woodblock printing and painting, Tsukioka Yoshitoshi, also featured the macaques in his prints. Also during the Edo period, numerous clasps for kimono or tobacco pouches (collectively called netsuke) were carved in the shape of macaques.

Spoken references to macaques abound in the history of Japan. Originating from before his rise to power, the famed samurai Toyotomi Hideyoshi was compared to a monkey in appearance and nicknamed Kozaru ("Little Monkey"). In modern Japanese culture, because monkeys are considered to indulge their libido openly and frequently (much the same way as rabbits are thought to in some Western cultures), a man who is preoccupied with sex might be compared to or metaphorically referred to as a monkey, as might a romantically involved couple who are exceptionally amorous.
