= Karl von Spiess =

Austrian archaeologist

- Born: 20 April 1880; Vienna, Austria-Hungary
- Died: 25 July 1957 (aged 77); Vienna, Austria

Academic background
- Education: University of Vienna
- Influences: Georg Hüsing

Academic work
- Main interests: German folklore

Karl von Spiess or Spieß (20 April 1880 – 1 July 1957) was an Austrian folklorist who specialized in the study of German folklore.

== Biography ==
Karl von Spiess was born in Vienna, Austria-Hungary on 20 April 1880. He received a Ph.D. in botany at the University of Vienna, and subsequently taught the natural sciences at a variety of gymnasiums in Vienna. From 1925 onward, von Spiess worked as a private scholar. At this time he was in close correspondence with Georg Hüsing and Wolfgang Schultz, with whom he discussed mythology. After the Anschluss, von Spiess became a Vienna associate of Amt Rosenberg. von Spiess was the author of numerous works on German folklore. He died in Innsbruck on 1 July 1957.

== Selected works ==
- Germanisches Erbe in der deutschen Volkskunst. In: Ernst Otto Thiele (Bearb.): Das germanische Erbe in der deutschen Volkskultur. Die Vorträge des 1. Deutschen Volkskundetages zu Braunschweig, Herbst 1938, München: Hoheneichen 1939, S. 34–56.
- Deutsche Volkskunde als Erschließerin deutscher Kultur, Stubenrauch Verlag, Berlin. First edition 1923, second edition 1943.

== See also ==
- Edmund Mudrak

== Sources ==
- Die Berliner Universität in der NS-Zeit: Band II: Fachbereiche und Fakultäten, hrsg. v. Rüdiger vom Bruch, Franz Steiner Verlag, Stuttgart 2005, ISBN 3515086587, S. 139–140.
