= Edmund Mudrak =

Austrian archaeologist

- Born: 27 October 1894; Vienna, Austria-Hungary
- Died: 25 September 1970 (aged 59); Vienna, Austria

Academic background
- Education: University of Vienna
- Doctoral advisor: Georg Hüsing
- Influences: Leopold von Schroeder

Academic work
- Discipline: Germanic philology
- Main interests: Early Germanic literature; German folklore; Germanic mythology

Edmund Mudrak (27 October 1894 – 12 December 1965) was an Austrian philologist who specialized in Germanic studies.

== Biography ==
Edmund Mudrak was born in Vienna, Austria-Hungary on 27 October 1894. He studied German, Oriental studies and prehistory at the University of Vienna, gaining his Ph.D. there under the supervision of Georg Hüsing with a thesis on Wayland the Smith.

Mudrak was a member of the Verein für Volkskunde and belonged to the mythological school of Leopold von Schroeder. He was a prominent member of the Deutsche Bildung movement. He worked closely with Karl von Spiess on the study of German folklore. From 1939 to 1943, Mudrak worked for Amt Rosenberg. In 1943 he was appointed Professor of Folklore at Reichsuniversität Posen.

After World War II, Mudrak workes as a teacher at the Akademisches Gymnasium in Vienna, and as a consultant at the Old Catholic Church of Austria. Since 1965 he was together with Karl Tekusch Deputy Chairman of the Muttersprache society in Vienna. Mudrak published a number of works on Germanic folklore, Germanic mythology and literature, which have been published in numerous editions up to the present day. He died in Vienna on 12 December 1965.

== See also ==
- Otto Höfler
- Richard Wolfram

== Selected works ==
- Mudrak, Edmund (1938). „Die Aufgaben der Volkskunde als einer lebendigen Wissenschaft“. In: Spieß, Karl von & Mudrak, Edmund. Deutsche Volkskunde als politische Wissenschaft. Zwei Aufsätze mit einem vollständigen Verlagsverzeichnis für 1923-1938 als Anhang. Berlin: Stubenrauch. S. 3–11.
- Mudrak, Edmund (Hg.) (2003). Sagen der Germanen. 23. Auflage. Eningen: Ensslin.
- Mudrak, Edmund (Hg.) (2009a). Deutsche Heldensagen. 36. Auflage. Hamburg: Nikol.
- Mudrak, Edmund (Hg.) (2009b). Nordische Götter- und Heldensagen. 28. Auflage. Hamburg: Nikol.
- Mudrak, Edmund (1943). „Sagen der Technik“. Hegel & Schade.
- Mudrak, Edmund & Spieß, Karl von & Sladky, Herta (Hg.) (1944). Hausbuch deutscher Märchen. Berlin: Stubenrauh.

== Sources ==
- Bockhorn, Olaf (1994). „Von Ritualen, Mythen und Lebenskreisen: Volkskunde im Umfeld der Universität Wien“. In: Jacobeit, Wolfgang & Lixfeld, Hannjost (Hg.). Völkische Wissenschaft. Gestalten und Tendenzen der deutschen und österreichischen Volkskunde in der ersten Hälfte des 20. Jahrhunderts. Wien / Köln / Weimar: Böhlau. S. 477–526.
- Mehl, Erwin (1966) „Unserem zweiten Obmanne, Univ.-Prof. i. R. Dr. Edmund Mudrak, zum Gedenken“. Nachruf. In: Wiener Sprachblätter 16/1. S. 1.
- Pfalzgraf, Falco (2016). „Karl von Spieß, mit einem Exkurs zu Edmund Mudrak“. In: Pfalzgraf, Falco. Karl Tekusch als Sprachpfleger. Seine Rolle in Wiener Sprachvereinen des 20. Jahrhunderts. Bremen: Hempen. (Greifswalder Beiträge zur Linguistik 10.) S. 44–47.
- Popa, Klaus (2010). „Mudrak Edmund (1894-1965)“. In: Popa, Klaus (Hg.). Völkisches Handbuch Südosteuropa. S. 67–68.
