= Muttersprache =

Muttersprache refers to the German mother tongue.

Muttersprache may also refer to:

- Muttersprache (linguistic society), Austria
- Muttersprache (album), album by German singer Sarah Connor released in 2015
