= Houston Stewart Chamberlain =

British-German racialist philosopher (1855–1927)

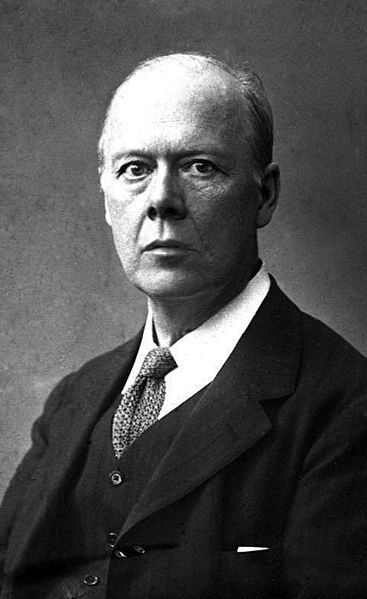
- Chamberlain in an undated photograph, likely 1910s-20s
- Born: 9 September 1855; Southsea, Hampshire, England
- Died: 9 January 1927 (aged 71); Bayreuth, Bavaria, Germany
- Citizenship: United Kingdom; France; Germany
- Education: Cheltenham College; University of Geneva
- Political party: NSDAP (1923-1927)
- Spouses: Anna Horst (m. 1878; div. 1905) Eva von Bülow-Wagner (m. 1908–1927)
- Father: William Charles Chamberlain
- Relatives: Basil Hall Chamberlain (brother)

Houston Stewart Chamberlain (/ˈtʃeɪmbərlɪn/; 9 September 1855 – 9 January 1927) was a British-German-French philosopher. His writings on political philosophy and natural science influenced Adolf Hitler, among many others, attributing all world accomplishments to the Germanic race. Chamberlain promoted German ethnonationalism, antisemitism, scientific racism, and Nordicism; he has been described as a "racialist writer". His best-known book, the two-volume Die Grundlagen des neunzehnten Jahrhunderts (The Foundations of the Nineteenth Century), published in 1899, became highly influential in the pan-Germanic Völkisch movements of the early 20th century, and later influenced the antisemitism of Nazi racial policy. In the early 1920s, Chamberlain met and encouraged Hitler.

Born in Hampshire, he immigrated to Dresden in adulthood out of an adoration for composer Richard Wagner. He married Eva von Bülow, Wagner's biological daughter, in December 1908, twenty-five years after Wagner's death. (Note: Eva von Bulow's mother, Cosima Wagner, was still married to Hans von Bülow when Eva was born – but her biological father was Wagner.) As a long admirer of French culture, he settled in Paris in 1884. He was later naturalised as a French citizen in 1914. During World War I, Chamberlain sided with Germany against his country of birth. He took German citizenship in 1916.

Though they share the same surname, he is not related to contemporary British politician Neville Chamberlain.

== Early life and education ==
Houston Stewart Chamberlain was born in Southsea, Hampshire, England, the son of Rear Admiral William Charles Chamberlain. His mother, Eliza Jane, daughter of Captain Basil Hall, died before he was a year old, leading to his being brought up by his grandmother in France. His elder brother was Professor Basil Hall Chamberlain. Chamberlain's poor health frequently led him to being sent to the warmer climates of Spain and Italy for the winter. This constant moving about made it hard for Chamberlain to form lasting friendships.

=== Cheltenham College ===
Chamberlain's education began at a lycée in Versailles and continued mostly in continental Europe, but his father had planned a military career for his son. At the age of eleven he was sent to Cheltenham College, an English boarding school that produced many Army and Navy officers. Chamberlain deeply disliked Cheltenham College, and felt lonely and out of place there. The young Chamberlain was "a compulsive dreamer", more interested in the arts than in the military, and he developed a fondness for nature and a near-mystical sense of self.

Chamberlain grew up in a self-confident, optimistic, Victorian atmosphere that celebrated the nineteenth century as the "Age of Progress", a world that many Victorians expected to get progressively better with Britain leading the way for the rest of the world. He was supportive of the Liberal Party, and shared the general values of 19th-century British liberalism such as a faith in progress, of a world that could only get better, of the greatness of Britain as a liberal democratic and capitalist society. Chamberlain's major interests in his studies at Cheltenham were the natural sciences, especially astronomy. Chamberlain later recalled: "The stars seemed closer to me, more gentle, more worthy of trust, and more sympathetic – for that is the only word which describes my feelings – than any of the people around me in school. For the stars, I experienced true friendship".

=== Embracing conservativism ===
During his youth, Chamberlain – while not entirely rejecting at this point his liberalism – became influenced by the romantic conservative critique of the Industrial Revolution. Bemoaning the loss of "Merry Old England", this view argued for a return to a highly romanticized period of English history, with the people living happily in harmony with nature on the land overseen by a benevolent, cultured elite. In this critique, the Industrial Revolution was seen as a disaster which forced people to live in dirty, overcrowded cities, doing dehumanizing work in factories while society was dominated by a philistine, greedy middle class.

The prospect of serving as an officer in India or elsewhere in the British Empire held no attraction for him. In addition, he was a delicate child with poor health. At the age of fourteen he had to be withdrawn from school. After Cheltenham, Chamberlain always felt out of place in Britain, a society whose values Chamberlain felt were not his values, writing in 1876: "The fact may be regrettable but it remains a fact; I have become so completely un-English that the mere thought of England and the English makes me unhappy". Chamberlain travelled to various spas around Europe, accompanied by a Prussian tutor, Mr Otto Kuntze, who taught him German and interested him in German culture and history. Fascinated by Renaissance art and architecture, Chamberlain learned Italian and planned to settle in Florence for a time.

=== University of Geneva and racial theory ===
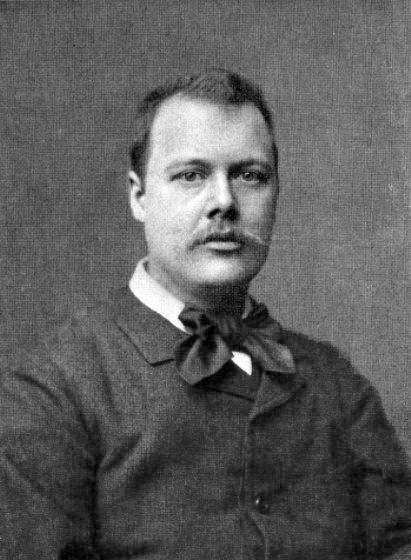
Chamberlain in 1886

Chamberlain attended the University of Geneva, in French-speaking Switzerland. There he studied under Carl Vogt, who was a supporter of racial typology, as well as under chemist Carl Gräbe, botanist Johannes Müller Argoviensis, physicist and parapsychologist Marc Thury, astronomer Emile Plantamour, and other professors. Chamberlain's main interests as a student revolved around systematic botany, geology, astronomy, and later the anatomy and physiology of the human body. In 1881, he earned a baccalaureate in physical and natural sciences. During his time in Geneva, Chamberlain, who always despised Benjamin Disraeli, came to hate his country more and more, accusing the Prime Minister of taking British life down to what Chamberlain considered to be his extremely low level. During the early 1880s, Chamberlain was still a Liberal, "a man who approached issues from a firmly Gladstonian perspective and showed a marked antipathy to the philosophy and policies of British Conservatism". Chamberlain often expressed his disgust with Disraeli, "the man whom he blamed in large measure for the injection of selfish class interest and jingoism into British public life in the next decades".

An early sign of his antisemitism came in 1881 when he described the landlords in Ireland affected by the Land Bill as "blood-sucking Jews". The main landowning classes in Ireland then were gentiles. At this stage of his life his antisemitic remarks were few and far between.

==== Botany dissertation: theory of vital force ====
In Geneva, Chamberlain continued working towards a doctorate in botany, but he later abandoned that project due to ill health. The text of what would have been Chamberlain's doctoral dissertation was published in 1897 as Recherches sur la sève ascendante ("Studies on rising sap"), but this publication did not culminate in any further academic qualifications.

Chamberlain's book was based on his own experimental observations of water transport in various vascular plants. Against the conclusions of Eduard Strasburger, Julius von Sachs, and other leading botanists, he argued that his observations could not be explained by the application of the fluid mechanical theories of the day to the motion of water in the plants' xylem conduits. Instead, he claimed that his results evidenced other processes, associated with the action of living matter and which he placed under the heading of a force vitale ("vital force").

Chamberlain summarised his thesis in the book's introduction:

Without the participation of these vital functions it is quite simply impossible for water to rise to heights of 150 feet, 200 feet and beyond, and all the efforts that one makes to hide the difficulties of the problem by relying on confused notions drawn from physics are little more reasonable than the search for the philosopher's stone.

In response to Strasburger's complaint that a vitalistic explanation of the ascent of sap "sidesteps the difficulties, calms our concerns, and thus manages to seduce us", Chamberlain retorted that "life is not an explanation, nor a theory, but a fact". Although most plant physiologists currently regard the ascent of sap as adequately explained by the passive mechanisms of transpirational pull and root pressure, some scientists have continued to argue that some form of active pumping is involved in the transport of water within some living plants, though usually without referring to Chamberlain's work.

==== Support of World Ice Theory ====
Chamberlain was an early supporter of Hanns Hörbiger's Welteislehre ("World Ice Theory"), the theory that most bodies in the Solar System are covered with ice. Due in part to Chamberlain's advocacy, this became official dogma during the Third Reich.

==== Anti-scientific claims ====
Chamberlain's attitude towards the natural sciences was somewhat ambivalent and contradictory – he later wrote: "one of the most fatal errors of our time is that which impels us to give too great weight to the so-called 'results' of science." Still, his scientific credentials were often cited by admirers to give weight to his political philosophy. Chamberlain rejected Darwinism, evolution and social Darwinism and instead emphasized "Gestalt" which he said derived from Goethe.

== Wagnerite ==
An ardent Francophile in his youth, Chamberlain had a marked preference for speaking French over English. It was only at the age of twenty three in November 1878, when he first heard the music of Richard Wagner, that Chamberlain became not only a Wagnerite, but an ardent Germanophile and Francophobe. As he put later, it was then he realized the full "degeneracy" of the French culture that he had so admired compared to the greatness of the German culture that had produced Wagner, whom Chamberlain viewed as one of the great geniuses of all time. In the music of Wagner, Chamberlain found the mystical, life-affirming spiritual force that he had sought unsuccessfully in British and French cultures. Further increasing his love of Germany was that he had fallen in love with a German woman named Anna Horst. As Chamberlain's wealthy, elitist family back in Britain objected to him marrying the lower middle-class Horst, this further estranged him from Britain, a place whose people Chamberlain regarded as cold, unfeeling, callous and concerned only with money. By contrast, Chamberlain regarded Germany as the romantic "land of love", a place whose people had human feelings like love, and whose culture was infused with a special spirituality that brought out the best in humanity.

In 1883–1884, Chamberlain lived in Paris and worked as a stockbroker. Chamberlain's attempts to play the Paris bourse ended in failure as he proved to be inept at business, and much of his hatred of capitalism stemmed from his time in Paris. More happily for him, Chamberlain founded the first Wagner society in Paris and often contributed articles to the Revue wagnérienne, the first journal in France devoted to Wagner studies. Together with his friend, the French writer Édouard Dujardin, Chamberlain did much to introduce Wagner to the French, who until then had largely ignored Wagner's music. Thereafter he settled in Dresden, where "he plunged heart and soul into the mysterious depths of Wagnerian music and philosophy, the metaphysical works of the Master probably exercising as strong an influence upon him as the musical dramas". Chamberlain immersed himself in philosophical writings, and became a Völkisch author, one of those concerned more with a highly racist understanding of art, culture, civilisation and spirit than with quantitative physical distinctions between groups. This is evidenced by his huge treatise on Immanuel Kant with its comparisons. It was during his time in Dresden that Chamberlain came to embrace völkisch thought through his study of Wagner, and from 1884 onwards, antisemitic and racist statements became the norm in his letters to his family. In 1888, Chamberlain wrote to his family proclaiming his joy at the death of the Emperor Friedrich III, a strong opponent of antisemitism whom Chamberlain called a "Jewish liberal", and rejoicing that his antisemitic son Wilhelm II was now on the throne. 1888 also saw Chamberlain's first visit to the Wahnfried to meet Cosima Wagner, the reclusive leader of the Wagner cult. Chamberlain later recalled that Cosima Wagner had "electrified" him as he felt the "deepest love" for Wagner's widow while Wagner wrote to a friend that she felt a "great friendship" with Chamberlain "because of his outstanding learning and dignified character". Wagner came to regard Chamberlain as her surrogate son. Under her influence, Chamberlain abandoned his previous belief that art was a separate entity from other fields and came to embrace the völkisch belief of the unity of race, art, nation and politics.

Chamberlain's status as an immigrant to Germany always meant he was to a certain extent an outsider in his adopted country – a man who spoke fluent German, but always with an English accent. Chamberlain tried very hard to be more German than the Germans, and it was his efforts to fit in that led him to völkisch politics. Likewise, his antisemitism allowed him to define himself as a German in opposition to a group that allegedly threatened all Germans, thereby allowing him to integrate better into the Wagnerian circles with whom he socialized most of the time. Chamberlain's friend Hermann Keyserling later recalled that Chamberlain was an eccentric English "individualist" who "never saw Germany as it really is", instead having an idealized, almost mythic view. This was especially the case as initially the German Wagnerites had rejected Chamberlain, telling him that only Germans could really understand Wagner, statements that very much hurt Chamberlain.

By this time Chamberlain had met Anna Horst, whom he would divorce in 1905 after 28 years of marriage. Chamberlain was an admirer of Richard Wagner, and wrote several commentaries on his works including Notes sur Lohengrin ("Notes on Lohengrin") (1892), an analysis of Wagner's drama (1892), and a biography (1895), emphasising in particular the heroic Teutonic aspects in the composer's works. Stewart Spencer, writing in Wagner Remembered, described Chamberlain's edition of Wagner letters as "one of the most egregious attempts in the history of musicology to misrepresent an artist by systematically censoring his correspondence". In particular, Wagner's lively sex life presented a problem for Chamberlain. Wagner had abandoned his first wife Minna, had an open affair with the married woman Mathilde Wesendonck and had started sleeping with his second wife Cosima while she was still married to her first husband. Chamberlain in his Wagner biography went to considerable lengths to distort these details.

During his time in Dresden, Chamberlain like many other völkisch activists became fascinated with Hindu mythology, and learned Sanskrit to read the ancient Indian epics like the Vedas and the Upanishads in their original form. In these stories about ancient Aryan heroes conquering the Indian subcontinent, Chamberlain found a very appealing world governed by a rigid caste system with social inferiors firmly locked into their place; full of larger-than-life Aryan gods and aristocratic heroes and a world that focused on the spiritual at the expense of the material. Since by this time, historians, archaeologists and linguists had all accepted that the Aryans ("noble ones") of Hindu legend were an Indo-European people, Chamberlain had little trouble arguing that these Aryans were in fact Germanic peoples, and modern Germans had much to learn from Hinduism. For Chamberlain the Hindu texts offered a body of pure Aryan thought that made it possible to find the harmony of humanity and nature, which provided the unity of thought, purpose and action that provided the necessary spirituality for Aryan peoples to find true happiness in a world being destroyed by a soulless materialism.

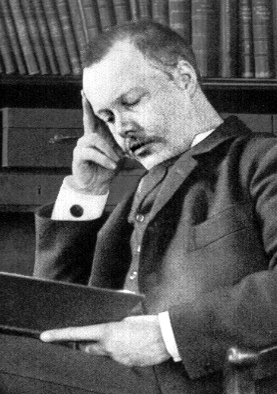
Chamberlain in 1895

== Champion of Wagnerism ==
In 1889, he moved to Austria. During this time it is said his ideas on race began taking shape, influenced by the concept of Teutonic supremacy he believed embodied in the works of Wagner and the French racist writer Arthur de Gobineau. In his book Essai sur l'inégalité des races humaines, the aristocratic Gobineau, who had an obsessive hatred of commoners, had developed the theory of an Aryan master race. Wagner was greatly influenced by Gobineau's theories, but could not accept Gobineau's theory of inevitable racial decay amongst what was left of the "Aryan race", instead preferring the idea of racial regeneration of the Aryans. The Franco-Israeli historian Saul Friedländer opined that Wagner was the inventor of a new type of antisemitism, namely "redemptive anti-semitism".

In 1908, twenty-five years after Wagner's death, Chamberlain married Eva von Bülow-Wagner, Franz Liszt's granddaughter and Richard Wagner's daughter (Wagner had started fathering children by Cosima while she was still married to Hans von Bülow – despite her surname, Eva was actually Wagner's daughter). The next year he moved to Germany and became an important member of the "Bayreuth Circle" of German nationalist intellectuals. As an ardent Wagnerite, Chamberlain saw it as his life's mission to spread the message of racial hatred which he believed Wagner had advocated. Chamberlain explained his work in promoting the Wagner cult as an effort to cure modern society of its spiritual ills that he claimed were caused by capitalism, industrialisation, materialism, and urbanisation. Chamberlain wrote about modern society in the 1890s:

Like a wheel that spins faster and faster, the increasing rush of life drives us continually further apart from each other, continually further from the 'firm ground of nature'; soon it must fling us out into empty nothingness.

In another letter, Chamberlain stated:

If we do not soon pay attention to Schiller's thought regarding the transformation from the state of Need into the Aesthetic State, then our condition will degenerate into a boundless chaos of empty talk and arms foundries. If we do not soon heed Wagner's warning—that mankind must awaken to a consciousness of its "pristine holy worth"—then the Babylonian tower of senseless doctrines will collapse on us and suffocate the moral core of our being forever.

In Chamberlain's view, the purpose of the Wagner cult was nothing less than the salvation of humanity. As such, Chamberlain became engulfed in the "redemptive anti-semitism" that was at the core of both Wagner's worldview and of the Wagner cult.

== Vienna years ==
In September 1891, Chamberlain visited Bosnia and Herzegovina. Chamberlain had been commissioned by the Austrian government to write propaganda glorying its colonial rule of Bosnia-Herzegovina for a Geneva newspaper. Chamberlain's articles about Bosnia reveal his increasing preference for dictatorship over democracy, with Chamberlain praising the Austrians for their utterly undemocratic rule. Chamberlain wrote that what he had seen in Bosnia-Herzegovina was the perfect example of Wagner's dictum: "Absolute monarch – free people!" Chamberlain declared that the Bosnians were extremely lucky not to have the shambles and chaos of a democratic "parliamentary regime", instead being ruled by an idealist, enlightened dictatorship that did what was best for them. Equally important in Chamberlain's Bosnian articles was his celebration of "natural man" who lived on the land as a small farmer as opposed to what Chamberlain saw as the corrupt men who lived in modern industrial, urban society. At the time Chamberlain visited Bosnia-Herzegovina, the provinces had been barely touched by modernization, and for the most part, Bosnians continued to live much as their ancestors had done in the Middle Ages. Chamberlain was enchanted with what he saw, and forgetting for the moment that the purpose of his visit was to glorify Austrian rule, expressed much sadness in his articles that the "westernization" being fostered by the Austrians would destroy the traditional way of life in Bosnia. Chamberlain wrote:

[The Bosnian peasant] builds his house, he makes his shoes, and plough, etc.; the woman weaves and dyes the stuffs and cooks the food. When we have civilized these good people, when we have taken from them their beautiful costumes to be preserved in museums as objects of curiosity, when we have ruined their national industries that are so perfect and so primitive, when contact with us has destroyed the simplicity of their manner—then Bosnia will no longer be interesting to us.

Chamberlain's awe and pride in the tremendous scientific and technological advances of the 19th century were always tempered with an extremely strong nostalgia for what he saw as the simpler, better and more innocent time when people lived on the land in harmony with nature. In his heart, Chamberlain was always a romantic conservative who idealised the Middle Ages and was never quite comfortable with the changes wrought by the Industrial Revolution. In Bosnia, Chamberlain saw an essentially medieval society that still moved to the ancient rhythm of life that epitomized his pastoral ideal. Remembering Bosnia several years later, Chamberlain wrote:

The spirit of a natural man, who does everything and must create everything for himself in life, is decidedly more universal and more harmoniously developed than the spirit of an industrial worker whose whole life is occupied with the manufacturing of a single object ... and that only with the aid of a complicated machine, whose functioning is quite foreign to him. A similar degeneration is taking place amongst peasants: an American farmer in the Far West is today only a kind of subordinate engine driver. Also among us in Europe it becomes every day more impossible for a peasant to exist, for agriculture must be carried out in "large units"—the peasant consequently becomes increasingly like an industrial worker. His understanding dries up; there is no longer an interaction between his spirit and surrounding Nature.

Chamberlain's nostalgia for a pre-industrial way of life that he expressed so strongly in his Bosnia articles earned him ridicule, as many believed that he had an absurdly idealized and romanticized view of the rural life that he never experienced first-hand.

In 1893, Chamberlain received a letter from Cosima Wagner telling him that he had to read Gobineau's Essai sur l'inégalité des races humaines. Chamberlain accepted Gobineau's belief in an Aryan master-race, but rejected his pessimism, writing that Gobineau's philosophy was "the grave of every attempt to deal practically with the race question and left only one honorable solution, that we at once put a bullet through our heads". Chamberlain's time in Vienna shaped his antisemitism and Pan-Germanism. Despite living in Vienna from 1889 to 1909, when he moved to Bayreuth, Chamberlain had nothing but contempt for the multi-ethnic, multi-religious Habsburg empire, taking the viewpoint that the best thing that could happen to the Austrian empire would be for it to be annexed by Germany to end the Völkerchaos (chaos of the peoples). Vienna had a large Jewish population, and Chamberlain's time in Vienna may have been the first time in his life when he actually encountered Jews. Chamberlain's letters from Vienna constantly complain about how he was having to deal with Jews, every one of whom he detested. In 1894 after visiting a spa, Chamberlain wrote: "Unfortunately like everything else ... it has fallen into the hands of the Jews, which includes two consequences: every individual is bled to the utmost and systematically, and there is neither order nor cleanliness." In 1895, he wrote:

However, we shall have to move soon anyway, for our house having been sold to a Jew ... it will soon be impossible for decent people to live in it. ... Already the house being almost quite full of Jews, we have to live in a state of continual warfare with the vermin which is a constant and invariable follower of this chosen people even in the most well-to-do classes.

In another letter of 1895, Chamberlain wrote he was still influenced by French anarchist Pierre-Joseph Proudhon's critique of the Jews as mindlessly materialistic, writing that Proudhon was "one of the most acute minds of the century" and "I find many points of contact between the Wagner-Schiller mode of thought and the anarchism of Proudhon." At the same time, Chamberlain's marriage to Anna began to fall apart, as his wife was frequently sick and though she assisted her husband with his writings, he did not find her very intellectually stimulating. Chamberlain started to complain more and more that his wife's frequent illnesses forced him to tend to her and were holding back his career.

Though Chamberlain consistently remained supportive of German imperialism, he frequently expressed hostile views towards the British Empire; Chamberlain viewed Britain as world's most frequent aggressor, a view he expressed more vehemently at the tail end of the 19th century. In 1895, Chamberlain wrote to his aunt about the Hamidian massacres in the Ottoman Empire during 1894–96:

The Armenian insurrection [of 1894] with the inevitable retaliation of massacres and persecution (of course enormously exaggerated by those greatest liars in creation, backed by their worthy friends the English journalists) was all got up at the precise moment when English politics required a "diversion".

In 1896, Chamberlain wrote to his aunt:

The English press is the most insufferably arrogant, generally ignorant, the most passionately one-sided and narrow-minded in its judgments that I know; it is the universal bully, always laying down the law for everybody, always speaking as if it were umpire of the universe, always abusing everybody all round and putting party spirit in all its judgments, envenoming thus the most peaceful discussions. It is this and this only which has made England hated all the world over. During the whole year 1895, I never opened an English newspaper without finding War predicated or threatened—No other nation in the world has wanted war or done anything but pray for peace—England alone, the world's bully, has been stirring it up on all sides.

During the 1890s, Chamberlain was an outspoken critic of British policies in South Africa, writing to his uncle in 1898:

We are the heathen nation and race par excellence. War, conquest, commerce, money and above all an eternal readiness to knock every man down who stands in our way. And the only thing thoroughly distasteful to me in England and Englishmen generally, and English politics in particular, is this eternal coquetting with a religion to which every one of their feelings and opinions and acts is in direct contradiction.

— Quoted in Field (1981), p. 356.

At the time of the Second Boer War, Chamberlain privately expressed support for the cause of the Boers, although he also expressed regret over "white men" fighting each other at a time when Chamberlain believed that white supremacy around the world was being threatened by the alleged "Yellow Peril". In July 1900, Chamberlain wrote to his aunt:

One thing I can clearly see, that is, that it is criminal for Englishmen and Dutchmen to go on murdering each other for all sorts of sophisticated reasons, while the Great Yellow Danger overshadows us white men and threatens destruction. ... The fact that a tiny nation of peasants absolutely untrained in the conduct of war, has been able to keep the whole united empire at bay for months, and has only been overcome—and has it been overcome?—by sending out an army superior in number to the whole population including women and children, has lowered respect for England beyond anything you can imagine on your side of the water, and will certainly not remain lost on the minds of those countless millions who have hitherto been subdued by our prestige only.

Chamberlain seized upon the fact that some of the Randlords were Jewish to argue in his letters to Cosima Wagner that the war was a case of Anglo-Jewish aggression against the Germanic Afrikaners.

As a leading Wagnerite in Vienna, Chamberlain befriended a number of other prominent Wagnerites, such as Prince Hohenhohe-Langenburg, Ludwig Schemann, Georg Meurer, and Baron Christian von Ehrenfels. The most important friendship that Chamberlain made during his time in Vienna was with German Ambassador to Austria-Hungary, Philipp, Prince of Eulenburg, who shared Chamberlain's love of Wagnerian music. Eulenburg was also an antisemite, an Anglophobe and a convinced enemy of democracy who found much to admire in Chamberlain's antisemitic, anti-British and anti-democratic writings.

== Die Grundlagen (The Foundations) ==
In February 1896, the Munich publisher Hugo Bruckmann, a leading völkisch activist who was later to publish Mein Kampf, commissioned Chamberlain to write a book summarizing the achievements of the 19th century.

In October 1899, Chamberlain published his most famous work, Die Grundlagen des neunzehnten Jahrhunderts, in German. The Foundations is a pseudo-scientific "racial history" of humanity from the emergence of the first civilizations in the ancient Near East to the year 1800. It argues that all of the "foundations" of the 19th century, which saw huge economic, scientific and technological advances in the West, were the work of the "Aryan race". Die Grundlagen was only the first volume of an intended three-volume history of the West, with the second and third volumes taking up the story of the West in the 19th century and the looming war for world domination in the coming 20th century between the Aryans on one side vs. the Jews, blacks and Asians on the other side.

Chamberlain never wrote the second or third volumes, much to the intense annoyance of Cosima Wagner, who was upset that Die Grundlagen stopped in 1800 before Wagner was born, and thus omitted her husband. The book argued that Western civilisation is deeply marked by the influence of Teutonic peoples.

=== Peoples defined as Aryans ===
Chamberlain grouped all European peoples – not just Germans, but Celts, Slavs, Greeks, and Latins – into the "Aryan race", a race built on the ancient Proto-Indo-European culture. In fact, he even included the Berber people of North Africa.

At the helm of the Aryan race, and, indeed, all races, according to Chamberlain, were the Germanic or Teutonic peoples, who had best preserved the Aryan blood. Chamberlain used the terms Aryan, Indo-European and Indo-Germanic interchangeably, but he emphasised that purest Aryans were to be found in Central Europe and that in both France and Russia miscegenation had diluted the Aryan blood. Much of Chamberlain's theory about the superiority of the Aryan race was taken from the writings of Gobineau, but there was a crucial difference in that Gobineau had used the Aryan race theory as a way of dividing society between an Aryan nobility versus racially inferior commoners whereas Chamberlain used the Aryan racial theory as a way of uniting society around its supposed common racial origins.

=== Aryan race virtues ===
Everything that Chamberlain viewed as good in the world was ascribed to the Aryans. For an example, in The Foundations, Chamberlain explained at considerable length that Jesus Christ could not possibly be a Jew, and very strongly implied that Christ was an Aryan.

Chamberlain's tendency to see everything good as the work of the Aryans allowed him to claim whoever he approved of for the Aryan race, which at least was part of the appeal of the book in Germany when it was published in 1899. Chamberlain claimed all of the glories and achievements of ancient Greece and Rome as due entirely to Aryan blood. Chamberlain wrote that ancient Greece was a "lost ideal" of beautiful thought and art that the modern Germans were best placed to recover if only the German people could embrace Wagner.

Chamberlain praised Rome for its militarism, civic values, patriotism, respect for the law and reverence for the family as offering the best sort of Aryan government. Reflecting his opposition to feminism, Chamberlain lamented how modern women were not like the submissive women of ancient Rome whom he claimed were most happy in obeying the wills of their husbands. Chamberlain asserted that Aryans and Aryans alone are the only people in the entire world capable of creating beautiful art and thinking great thoughts, so he claimed all of the great artists, writers and thinkers of the West as part of one long glorious tradition of Aryan art and thought, which Chamberlain planned to have culminate with the life-changing, racially regenerating music of Richard Wagner in the 19th century. As the British historian George Peabody Gooch wrote, here was "a glittering vision of mind and muscle, of large scale organization, of intoxicating self-confidence, of metallic brilliancy, such as Europe has never seen".

The antithesis of the heroic Aryan race with its vital, creative life-improving qualities was the "Jewish race", whom Chamberlain presented as the inverse of the Aryan. Every positive quality the Aryans had, the Jews had the exact opposing negative quality. The American historian Geoffrey Field wrote:

To each negative "Semitic" trait Chamberlain counter-posed a Teutonic virtue. Kantian moral freedom took the place of political liberty and egalitarianism. Irresponsible Jewish capitalism was sharply distinguished from the vague ideal of Teutonic industrialism, a romantic vision of an advanced technological society which had somehow managed to retain the Volksgemeinschaft, cooperation and hierarchy of the medieval guilds. The alternative to Marxism was "ethical socialism", such as that described by Thomas More, "one of the most exquisite scholars ever produced by a Teutonic people, of an absolutely aristocratic, refined nature". In the rigidly elitist, disciplined society of Utopia with its strong aura of Christian humanism, Chamberlain found an approximation of his own nostalgic, communal ideal. "The gulf separating More from Marx," he wrote, "is not the progress of time, but the contrast between Teuton and Jew."

=== Jewish wars claim ===
Chamberlain announced in The Foundations that "all the wars" in history were "so peculiarly connected with Jewish financial operations". Chamberlain warned that the aim of the Jew was "to put his foot upon the neck of all nations of the world and be Lord and possessor of the whole earth".

As part of their plans to destroy Aryan civilization, Chamberlain wrote: "Consider, with what mastery they use the law of blood to extend their power." Chamberlain wrote that Jewish women were encouraged to marry Gentiles while Jewish men were not, so the male line "remained spotless ... thousands of side-branches are cut off and employed to infect Indo-Europeans with Jewish blood." In his account of the Punic Wars between "Aryan Rome" and "Semitic Carthage", Chamberlain praised the Romans for their total destruction of Carthage in 146 BC at the end of the Third Punic War as an example of how Aryans should deal with Semites. Later, Chamberlain argued that the Romans had become too tolerant of Semites like the Jews, and this was the cause of the downfall of the Roman empire. As such, the destruction of the Western Roman Empire by the Germanic peoples was merely an act of liberation from the Völkerchaos ("Chaos of the Peoples") that the Roman empire had become.

=== Theories of Jewish conspiracy ===
The ultimate aim of the Jew, according to Chamberlain, was to create a situation where "there would be in Europe only a single people of pure race, the Jews, all the rest would be a herd of pseudo-Hebraic mestizos, a people beyond all doubt degenerate physically, mentally and morally."

As part of their plans to destroy the Aryans, Chamberlain claimed that the Jews had founded the Roman Catholic Church, which only preached a "Judaized" Christianity that had nothing to do with the Christianity created by the Aryan Christ. Some historians have argued that The Foundations are actually more anti-Catholic than antisemitic, but this misses the point that the reason why Chamberlain attacked the Catholic Church so fiercely was because he believed the Papacy was controlled by the Jews. Chamberlain claimed that in the 16th century the Aryan Germans under the leadership of Martin Luther had broken away from the corrupt influence of Rome, and so laid the foundations of a "Germanic Christianity".

Chamberlain claimed that the natural and best form of government for Aryans was a dictatorship, and so he blamed the Jews for inventing democracy as part of their plans for destroying the Aryans. In the same way, Chamberlain blamed capitalism – which he saw as a very destructive economic system – as something invented by the Jews to enrich themselves at the expense of the Aryans while at the same time crediting the Jews with inventing socialism with its message of universal human equality as a cunning Jewish stratagem to divert attention away from all the economic devastation wrought by Jewish financiers.

Chamberlain had a deep dislike of the Chinese, and in The Foundations he announced that Chinese civilization had been founded by the Jews.

=== Jewish race – not religion ===
The Franco-Israeli historian Saul Friedländer described The Foundations – with its theory of two "pure" races left in the world, namely the German and Jewish locked into a war for world domination which could only end with the complete victory of one over the other – as one of the key texts of "redemptive anti-semitism". Because Chamberlain viewed Jews as a race, not a religion, Chamberlain argued the conversion of Jews was not a "solution" to the "Jewish Question", stating Jewish converts to Christianity were still Jews. Dutch journalist Ian Buruma wrote:

Wagner himself, like Luther, still believed that a Jew could, as he put it with his customary charm, "annihilate" his Jewishness by repudiating his ancestry, converting and worshiping at the shrine of Bayreuth. So in theory a Jew could be a German ... But to the mystical chauvinists, like Chamberlain, who took a tribal view of Germanness, even radical, Wagnerian assimilation could never be enough: the Jew was an alien virus to be purged from the national bloodstream. The more a Jew took on the habits and thoughts of his gentile compatriots, the more he was to be feared.

=== Leaving "the solution" to the reader ===
Chamberlain did not advocate the extermination of Jews in The Foundations; indeed, despite his determination to blame all of the world's problems on the Jews, Chamberlain never proposed a solution to this perceived problem. Instead, Chamberlain made the cryptic statement that after reading his book, his readers would know best about how to devise a "solution" to the "Jewish Question".

Friedländer has argued that if one were to seriously take up the theories of "redemptive anti-semitism" proposed in The Foundations, and push them to their logical conclusion, then inevitably one would reach the conclusion that genocide might be a perfectly acceptable "solution" to the "Jewish Question". Friedländer argued that there is an implied genocidal logic to The Foundations as Chamberlain argued that Jews were a race apart from the rest of humanity; that evil was embedded within the genes of the Jews, and so the Jews were born evil and remained evil until they died.

=== The Foundations sales, reviews and acceptance ===
The Foundations sold well: eight editions and 60,000 copies within 10 years, 100,000 copies by the outbreak of World War I and 24 editions and more than a quarter of a million copies by 1938.

The success of The Foundations after it was published in October 1899 made Chamberlain into a celebrity intellectual. The popularity of The Foundations was such that many Gymnasium (high school) teachers in the Protestant parts of Germany made Die Grundlagen required reading.

Conservative and National Liberal newspapers gave generally friendly reviews to The Foundations. Völkisch newspapers gave overwhelming positive reviews to The Foundations, with many völkisch reviewers calling it one of the greatest books ever written. Liberal and Social Democratic newspapers gave the book extremely poor reviews with reviewers complaining of an irrational way of reasoning in The Foundations, noting that Chamberlain quoted the writings of Goethe out of context in order to give him views that he had not held, and that the entire book was full of an obsessive antisemitism which they found extremely off-putting. Because of Chamberlain's anti-Catholicism, Catholic newspapers all published very hostile reviews of The Foundations, though Catholic reviewers rarely faulted Die Grundlagen for its antisemitism. More orthodox Protestant newspapers were disturbed by Chamberlain's call for a racialized Christianity. German Jewish groups like the Centralverein deutscher Staatsbürger jüdischen Glaubens and the Verein zur Abwehr des Antisemitismus repeatedly issued statements in the early 20th century that the popularity of The Foundations was a major source of concern for them, noting that Die Grundlagen had caused a major increase in antisemitism with many German Jews now finding themselves the objects of harassment and sometimes violence.

The German Jewish journalist Moritz Goldstein wrote in 1912 that he had become a Zionist because he believed there was no future for Jews in Germany, and one of the reasons for that belief was:

Chamberlain believes what he says and for that very reason his distortions shock me. And thousands more believe as he does for the book goes one edition after another and I would still like to know if many Germanic types, whose self-image is pleasantly indulged by this theory, are able to remain critical enough to question its countless injustices and errors?

Theodore Roosevelt wrote that:

Mr. Chamberlain's hatreds cover a wide gamut. They include Jews, Darwinists, the Roman Catholic Church, the people of southern Europe, Peruvians, Semites, and an odd variety of literary men and historians. To this sufficiently incongruous collection of antipathies he adds a much smaller selection of violent attachments, ranging from imaginary primitive Teutons and Aryans to Immanuel Kant, and Indian theology, metaphysics, and philosophy.

=== Discrimination of Jews following the book ===
German universities were hotbeds of völkisch activity in the early 20th century, and The Foundations was extremely popular on university campuses, with many university clubs using The Foundations as a reason to exclude Jewish students.

Likewise, military schools were centers of völkisch thought in the early 20th century, and so The Foundations was very popular with officer cadets; though since neither the Navy nor the Prussian, Bavarian, Saxon and Württemberg armies accepted Jewish officer candidates, Die Grundlagen did not lead to Jews being excluded.

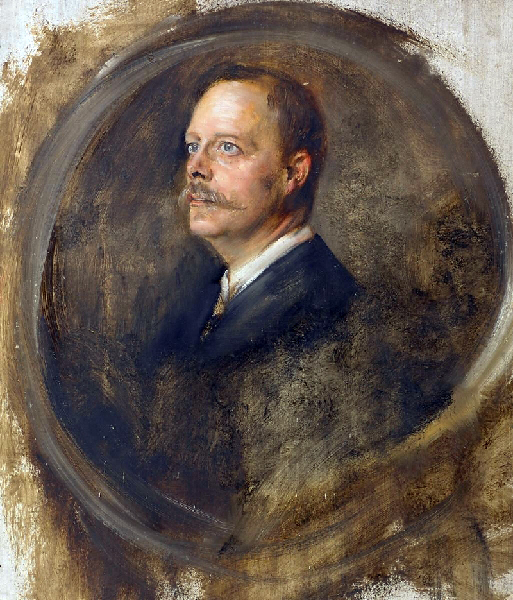
Portrait by Franz von Lenbach, c. 1902

== Evangelist of race ==
=== Visit to England and attack on its Jews ===
In 1900, for the first time in decades, Chamberlain visited Britain. Writing to Cosima Wagner from London, Chamberlain stated sadly that his Britain, the Britain of aristocratic rule, hard work and manly courage, the romanticized "Merry Old England" of his imagination was no more; it had been replaced by what Chamberlain saw as a materialist, soulless society, atomized into individuals with no sense of the collective purpose and dominated by greed. Chamberlain wrote that since the 1880s Britain had "chosen the service of Mammon", for which he blamed the Jews, writing to Wagner: "This is the result, when one has studied politics with a Jew for a quarter century." The "Jew" Chamberlain was referring to was Disraeli, whom Chamberlain had always hated. Chamberlain declared in his letter that all British businessmen were now dishonest; the middle class, smug and stupid; small farmers and shops were no longer able to compete with Jewish-owned big business; and the monarchy was "irretrievably weakened" by social change.

=== German superiority to rule the world ===
In the summer of 1900, Chamberlain wrote an essay in the magazine Jugend, where he declared that: "The reign of Wilhelm II has the character of the dawning of a new day." Chamberlain went on to write that Wilhelm was "in fact the first German Kaiser" who knew his mission was to "ennoble" the world by spreading "German knowledge, German philosophy, German art and—if God wills—German religion. Only a Kaiser who undertakes this task is a true Kaiser of the German people." To allow Germany to become a world power, Chamberlain called for the Reich to become the world's greatest sea power, as Chamberlain asserted that whatever power rules the seas also rules the world.

=== Kaiser Wilhelm II ===
In early 1901, the German Emperor Wilhelm II read The Foundations and was immensely impressed. The Imperial Grand Chamberlain at the court, Ulrich von Bülow, wrote in a letter to a friend in January 1901 that the Kaiser was "studying the book a second time page by page". In November 1901, Chamberlain's friend, the German diplomat and courtier Philipp, Prince of Eulenburg, who happened to be the best friend of Wilhelm II, introduced Chamberlain to the Kaiser.

Chamberlain and Wilhelm first met at Eulenburg's estate at Liebenberg. To reach Liebenberg from Vienna, Chamberlain had first to take a train to Berlin, and then board another train to Liebenberg. Chamberlain's meeting with the Kaiser was considered so important that when Chamberlain reached Berlin, he was met by the Chancellor Prince Bernhard von Bülow, who joined him on the trip to Liebenberg. During the train ride, Bülow and Chamberlain had a long discussion about The Foundations. When he met Chamberlain for the first time, Wilhelm told him: "I thank you for what you have done for Germany!" The next day, Eulenburg wrote to a friend that the Emperor "stood completely under the spell of [Chamberlain], whom he understood better than any of the other guests because of his thorough study of The Foundations". Until Chamberlain's death, he and Wilhelm had what the American historian Geoffrey Field called "a warm, personal bond", which was expressed in a series of "elaborate, wordy letters". The Wilhelm–Chamberlain letters were full of "the perplexing thought world of mystical and racist conservatism". They ranged far and wide in subject matter: the ennobling mission of the Germanic race, the corroding forces of Ultramontanism, materialism and the "destructive poison" of Judentum were favorite themes. Other subjects often discussed in the Wilhelm-Chamberlain letters were the dangers posed to the Reich by the "Yellow Peril", "Tartarized Slavdom", and the "black hordes". Wilhelm's later concept of "Juda-England", of a decaying Britain sucked dry by Jewish capitalists, owed much to Chamberlain. In 1901, Wilhelm informed Chamberlain in a letter that: "God sent your book to the German people, just as he sent you personally to me, that is my unshakably firm conviction." Wilhelm went on to praise Chamberlain as his "comrade-in-arms and ally in the struggle for Teutons against Rome, Jerusalem, etc."

The Dutch journalist Ian Buruma described Chamberlain's letters to the Kaiser as pushing his "Anglophobic, anti-Semitic, Germanophile ideas to the point of murderous lunacy". The liberal Berliner Zeitung newspaper complained in an editorial of the close friendship between Wilhelm II and such an outspoken racist and antisemite as Chamberlain, stating this was a real cause for concern for decent, caring people both inside and outside Germany.

For Wilhelm, all pride about being German had a certain ambivalence, as he was in fact half-British. In an age of ultra-nationalism with identities being increasingly defined in racial terms, his mixed heritage imposed considerable psychological strain on Wilhelm, who managed at one and the same time to be both an Anglophile and Anglophobe; he was a man who both loved and hated the British, and his writings about the land of his mother displayed both extreme admiration and loathing. Buruma observed that for all his much-vaunted beliefs in public about the superiority of everything German, in private Wilhelm often displayed signs of an inferiority complex to the British, as if he really felt deep down that it was Britain, not Germany, that was the world's greatest country. For Wilhelm, someone like Chamberlain, the Englishman who came to Germany to praise the Fatherland as the world's greatest nation, and who had "scientifically" proven that "fact" in The Foundations, was a "dream come true" for him. Writing about the Chamberlain-Wilhelm relationship, Field stated:

Chamberlain helped place Wilhelm's tangled and vaguely formulated fears of Pan Slavism, the black and yellow "hordes", Jews, Ultramontanes, Social Democrats, and free-thinkers to a global and historical framework copiously footnoted and sustained by a vast array of erudite information. He elevated the Emperor's dream of a German mission into an elaborate vision of divinely ordained, racial destiny. The lack of precision, the muddle, and logical flaws that are so apparent to modern readers of The Foundations did not bother Wilhelm: he eagerly submitted to its subjective, irrational style of reasoning. ... And if the Kaiser was a Prussian with an ingrained respect for English values and habits, Chamberlain was just as much an Englishman who was deeply ambivalent about his own birthplace and who revered German qualities and Prussian society. Almost unconsciously, as his vast correspondence shows, he adopted an obsequious, scraping tone when addressing the lowliest of Prussian army officers. If Wilhelm was drawn to the very Englishness of Chamberlain, the author of The Foundations saw in the Hohenzollern prince—at least until the World War—the very symbol of his idealized Deutschtum.

Chamberlain frequently wrote to an appreciative and admiring Wilhelm telling him that it was only the noble "German spirit" which was saving the world from being destroyed by a "deracinated Yankee-Anglo-Jewish materialism". Finally, Wilhelm was also a Wagnerite and found much to admire in Chamberlain's writings praising Wagner's music as a mystical, spiritual life-force that embodied all that was great about the "German spirit".

=== 'The Foundations' book success ===
The success of The Foundations made Chamberlain famous all over the world. In 1906, the Brazilian intellectual Sílvio Romero cited Chamberlain together with Otto Ammon, Georges Vacher de Lapouge and Arthur de Gobineau as having proved that the blond "dolichocephalic" people of northern Europe were the best and greatest race in the entire world, and urged that Brazil could become a great nation by a huge influx of German immigrants who would achieve the embranquecimento (whitening) of Brazil. Chamberlain received invitations to lecture on his racial theories at Yale and Johns Hopkins universities, but turned them down on the grounds that he had no wish to visit what he viewed as a culturally and spiritually debased nation like the United States.

When the book was first published, there was much fevered speculation in the German press as to whether Chamberlain was related to Joseph Chamberlain, the British Colonial Secretary who, as the principal author of the British forward policy in South Africa, was one of the most detested men in the Reich. Several German magazines mistakenly printed pictures of Joseph Chamberlain's sons, Austen Chamberlain and Neville Chamberlain, identifying them as the author of The Foundations. Many Germans breathed a sigh of relief when it was established that Houston Stewart Chamberlain was not related to the Chamberlain family of Birmingham.

=== Chamberlain circle ===
After the success of The Foundations, a Chamberlain Kreis (circle) appeared in Vienna that comprised the Indologist Leopold von Schroeder, Count Ulrich von Bülow; Countess Melanie Metternich-Zichy, Countess Marietta von Coudenhove, Baroness Emma von Ehrenfels, the music critic and Wagnerite Gustav Schonaich, Count Ulrich von Brockdorff-Rantzau, Count Hermann Keyserling and Rudolf Kassner who met weekly at Chamberlain's home to discuss his racial theories.

=== Personal life and financials ===
It was during this period that Chamberlain had an affair with Baroness von Ehrenfels, the wife of his friend Baron Christian von Ehrenfels and another affair with a Viennese showgirl, Lili Petri. In 1906, his marriage to Anna ended in divorce.

Besides the income from sales of The Foundations and the essays he was constantly writing for newspapers and journals, Chamberlain was supported financially by a wealthy German piano-manufacturer, August Ludowici (who liked Chamberlain so much that he purchased a house for him), and by the Swiss industrialist Agénor Boissier, giving an annual income of about 30,000–40,000 marks (by contrast a German school-teacher had an annual income of 1,000 marks, while a professor made about 12,000 marks per year). In 1908, after Cosima Wagner suggested the match, Chamberlain married Wagner's daughter Eva von Bülow.

=== Chamberlain's character ===
Chamberlain saw himself as a prophet, writing to the Kaiser: "Today, God relies only on the Germans. That is the knowledge, the sure truth, which has filled my soul for years; I have sacrificed my peace in serving it; for it I shall live and die." Eulenburg recalled that under his quiet demeanor Chamberlain had a "fiery spirit with those eyes and looks which speak volumes". The few who knew Chamberlain well described him as a quiet, reserved man full of urbane erudition and charm; a modest, genial character with elegant manners dressed in expensive suits who could talk brilliantly and with much wit about a great number of subjects for hours. But under his polished surface, Chamberlain had a "fanatical and obsessive" side. His copious notebooks and letters show a man with "a profoundly irrational mind", a markedly sadistic and deeply paranoid individual who believed himself to be the victim of a monstrous worldwide Jewish conspiracy to destroy him. Chamberlain's status as a semi-recluse came about because of his fear that the Jews were plotting his murder.

=== German world dominance by race ===
A strong imperialist, Chamberlain was naturally a fervent supporter of Weltpolitik, under which Germany sought to become the world's dominant power, which he justified on racist grounds. In 1904, when the German government committed the Herero and Nama Genocide against the Herero and Nama peoples in German South-West Africa, Chamberlain congratulated Wilhelm in a letter for his genocidal policies, praising the Kaiser for his "war of extermination", which was "a fine example" of how Aryans should deal with "niggers". In a 1906 letter to Wilhelm, Chamberlain announced that due to miscegenation caused by the Jews, Britain, France, Austria and Russia were all declining powers, and only the "pure" German Reich was capable of protecting the "life-giving center of Western Europe" from the "Tartarized Russians, the dreaming weakly mongrels of Oceania and South America, and the millions of blacks, impoverished in intellect and bestially inclined, who even now are arming for the war of the races in which there will be no quarter given". Thus, Chamberlain wrote to Wilhelm, German Weltpolitik was a "sacred mission" to protect the superior races and cultures from the inferior.

=== Harden–Eulenburg affair ===
In 1908, the Harden–Eulenburg affair badly damaged Wilhelm's reputation when Wilhelm's and Chamberlain's mutual friend Eulenburg was exposed in the press as a homosexual. Since Eulenburg had been the Emperor's best friend since 1886, the scandal led to much gossip all over the Reich about whether Wilhelm and Eulenburg had been more than just best friends. Chamberlain was never as close to Eulenburg as Wilhelm was, and seemed genuinely shocked to learn of the allegations that Eulenburg was homosexual. During the scandal, practically the entire völkisch movement came out in support of Eulenburg whom they portrayed as an Aryan heterosexual framed by false allegations of homosexuality by the Jews Max Bernstein and Magnus Hirschfeld. The German journalist Theodor Wolff wrote in 1906 about Eulenburg's role as one of Germany's chief antisemites:

I bet you ten to one that it was that skald [Eulenburg], the friend and admirer of Gobineau, who first pointed his other friend, the Kaiser towards the racial prophet's most eager disciple, Houston Stewart Chamberlain. The mystical notion of the "race that will bring order to the world" found its way from Gobineau via Eulenburg and Chamberlain to the Kaiser, and this notion in turn gave rise to the thought that "the world should be healed by the German spirit."

=== Toning down attacks on Catholicism ===
As a part of his role as the "Evangelist of Race", Chamberlain toned down his anti-Catholicism in the first decade of the 20th century, realizing belatedly that his attacks on the Catholic Church in The Foundations had alienated the German Catholic community from his message.

=== Themes: German unity and German science and philosophy ===
As a well-known public intellectual, Chamberlain wrote on numerous subjects in a vast array of newspapers and magazines. Besides attacking the Jews, one of the chief themes of Chamberlain's essays was the unity of German culture, language, race and art, and the need for the unity of German art with a racialized "Germanic Christianity".

The other major theme of Chamberlain's work was science and philosophy. Chamberlain was always keenly interested in modern science and saw himself as a scientist, but he was deeply critical of the claim that modern science could explain everything, believing there was a spiritual side to humanity that science could not explain. As such, Chamberlain believed that modern Germany was being destroyed by people losing their spiritual aspects owing to the materialist belief that science could explain all.

In his 1905 biography of one of his heroes, the philosopher Immanuel Kant, Chamberlain argued that Kant had shown the limits of rationalism and reason for understanding the world. Instead, Chamberlain argued that Kant had shown that the instinctive approach based on intuition was a far more valid way of understanding the world. Chamberlain's "Kantian" way of understanding science was used to attack the Jews, with Chamberlain writing:

In order to understand Kant we must ... begin by once and for all getting rid of the heavy burden of inherited and indoctrinated Jewish conceptions.

—

Chamberlain's 1912 biography of another of his heroes, Johann Wolfgang von Goethe, was used to pass on the same message. Chamberlain depicted Goethe as a "Kantian" man who had correctly embraced both the rational, scientific approaches to life and the instinctive, mystical approach to achieve a synthesis that embraced the best of both worlds. Again, Chamberlain used Goethe as a way of attacking the Jews, with Chamberlain claiming that Goethe had favored banning sexual relations between Aryans and Jews and was a man who would not have "suffered among us" the Jewish artists, journalists, and professors of modern Germany.

The German Jewish journal Im deutschen Reich wrote in a review of Goethe that Chamberlain had appropriated Goethe in "a polemic about race politics, racial hygiene and racial worth from the standpoint of a monomaniacal Judeophobia".

=== Embracing Treitschke ===
The policies of Weltpolitik, especially the Tirpitz Plan, brought about a period of Anglo-German tension in the first years of the 20th century. Chamberlain, who detested the land of his birth, had no trouble taking sides in the emerging Anglo-German antagonism. Chamberlain, who came to hate Britain, expressed his approval of the writings of the Anglophobic and antisemitic German historian Heinrich von Treitschke, whose view of Britain as a grasping, greedy nation of cheap traders dishonestly vacuuming up the world's wealth was the same as his own.

=== Necessary German power ===
Chamberlain declared to Wilhelm that Germany now had to become the world's greatest power, both for its own good and for the good of the rest of the world. In his letter, Chamberlain dismissed France as a second-rate nation that could only fall further; Russia was a nation of "stupid" Slavs which was only just being held together because Nicholas II had German blood; without the German blood in the House of Romanov "nothing would remain but a decaying matière brute" in Russia; and Britain was clearly declining into a bottomless pit of greed, ineffective democratic politics and unrestrained individualism. Chamberlain called the United States a "Dollar dynasty", writing:

From dollars only dollars can come, nothing else; spiritually America will live only so long as the stream of European spiritual power flows there, not a moment longer. That part of the world, it may be proven, creates sterility, it has as little of a future as it has a past.

Chamberlain concluded his letter to Wilhelm that: "The future progress of mankind depends on a powerful Germany extending far across the earth." To this end, Chamberlain advocated German expansionism both in Europe and all over the world; building the High Seas Fleet which would break the British mastery of the seas; and restructuring German society along the lines advocated by the extreme right-wing völkisch Pan-German League.

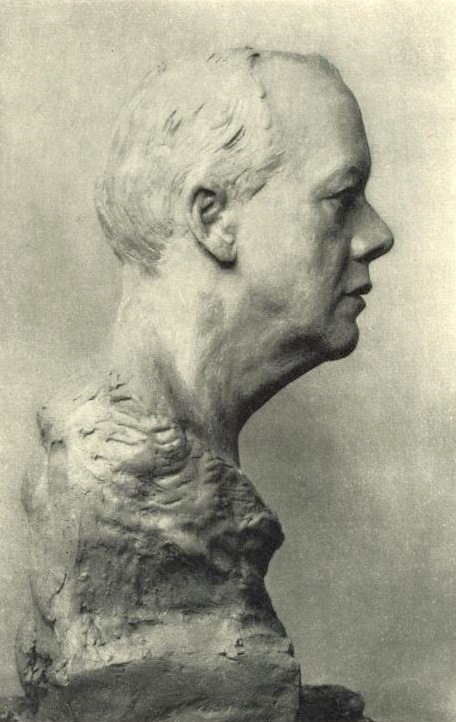
Bust of Chamberlain (c. 1914), from an unfinished clay model for a bust by Joseph Hinterbeher

== Propagandist of the World War ==
=== Health and paralysis ===
In August 1914, he started suffering from a progressive paralysis of the limbs. At the end of the war, Chamberlain's paralysis had already befallen much of his body; his chronically bad health had reached its final stage.

=== Taking Germany's side ===
When World War I started in 1914, Chamberlain tried to enlist in the German Army, but was turned down on account of his age (then 58) and bad health. In August 1914, Chamberlain wrote a letter to his brother, Basil Hall Chamberlain, explaining why he had sided with his adopted country:

No war has ever been simpler than this; England has not for a moment reduced her efforts to do everything humanly possible to bring it about and to destroy every peaceful impulse. ... Germany's victory will not be England's ruin; quite the contrary, it is the only hope for England's rescue from the total ruin in which she now stands. England's victory will be terrible for the whole world, a catastrophe.

The same month, Chamberlain published an essay celebrating Wilhelm II as an "Aryan soldier-king" and as a "Siegfried" who had embraced the "struggle against the corroding poison of Jewry". Chamberlain went on to call the war "a life-or-death struggle ... between two human ideals: the German and the un-German". Accordingly, the Reich must "for the next hundred years or more" strengthen all things German and carry out "the determined extermination of the un-German".

Chamberlain happily welcomed the war, writing in September 1914 to his friend Prince Max of Baden: "I thank God that I have been allowed to experience these two exaltations—1870 and 1914—and that I was both times in Germany and saw the truth with my own eyes." In his 1914 essay, "Whose Fault Is the War?", Chamberlain blamed the war on France, Russia and especially Britain. Initially Chamberlain expected the war to be over by the end of 1914, and was very disappointed when that did not occur. In 1916 he also acquired German citizenship. He had already begun propagandising on behalf of the German government and continued to do so throughout the war. His vociferous denunciations of his land of birth, it has been posited, were the culmination of his rejection of his native England's capitalism, in favour of a form of German Romanticism akin to that which he had cultivated in himself during his years at Cheltenham.

=== Wartime Essays ===
During World War I, Chamberlain published several propaganda texts against his country of birth—Kriegsaufsätze (Wartime Essays). In the first four tracts, he maintained that Germany is a nation of peace; England's political system is a sham, while Germany exhibits true freedom; German is the greatest and only remaining "living" language; and the world would be better off doing away with English and French-styled parliamentary governments in favour of German rule "thought out by a few and carried out with iron consequence". The final two discuss England and Germany at length.

Chamberlain's basic argument was that democracy was an idiotic system as equality was a myth—humans were very different with different abilities and talents, so democratic equality where the opinions of one voter mattered much as the opinions of the next was a completely flawed idea. Quoting the French scientist Gustave Le Bon, Chamberlain wrote the vast majority of people were simply too stupid to properly understand the issues, and as such Germany with its rule by elites was a much better governed nation than France. In Germany, Chamberlain asserted, true freedom existed, as freedom came from the state alone which made it possible for society to function, not the individual as was the case in Britain and France, which Chamberlain claimed was a recipe for chaos. Field summarized Chamberlain's thesis:

the essence of German freedom was the willing submission as a matter of conscience to legitimately constituted authorities; it implied duty more than rights and was something spiritual and internal for which each moral being had to strive. Consigning 'liberty' to an inner, 'nonpolitical' moral realm, Chamberlain closed off any discussion of the specific conditions for a free society and simply asserted that freedom was perfectly compatible with an authoritarian system of government.

Chamberlain argued that in democratic states, it was always big business that was really in charge; as such democracy was a fraud and democratic governments only served the rich; and democratic states only existed "to further the interests of money making all over the globe".

=== Attacks on democracy ===
Chamberlain's attacks on democracy as a sham designed to allow "Jewish plutocrats" to rule the world were not only very anti-British and anti-French, but also anti-American. From the start of the war, Chamberlain attacked all democratic governments in the world including the neutral United States as a fraud perpetrated by the Jews. Chamberlain wrote that America "is a hellish whirlpool, in which all the contradictions of the world, all the greed, envy and lust brew and simmer; a wild struggle of millions of ignorant egotists, men without ideas, ideals, or traditions, without shared values, without any capacity for sacrifice, an atomic chaos endowed with no true power of nature". Until the United States entered the war in 1917, the Auswärtiges Amt worked hard to prevent Chamberlain's essays with their strong anti-American content from appearing abroad out of the fear that they would offend opinion in America. Chamberlain's wartime writings also gained much attention – albeit of a highly negative sort – in his native Britain, with The Times Literary Supplement declaring: "The most ignorant of the Germans has not written greater nonsense." In 1915, an unauthorised translation of Chamberlain's wartime essays was published in London under the title of The Ravings of a Renegade.

=== Germany versus England ===
In his 1915 pamphlet Deutschland und England (Germany and England), Chamberlain vigorously took the side of his adopted land against the land of his birth. Chamberlain explained the British were once noble Aryans like the Germans who lived in a perfect rigidly hierarchical, romantically rural "unmixed" society, but then starting in the 16th century capitalism had corrupted the English. Capitalism had turned the English into an urban nation dominated by a vulgar money-grabbing, philistine middle class incapable of culture. The beautiful English countryside, which Chamberlain claimed was once the home of an idyllic agrarian society, had become an ugly urban landscape full of polluting factories owned by greedy Jewish capitalists. Even worse in Chamberlain's opinion, capitalism had led the English into a process of racial degeneration, democracy and rule by the Jews. Chamberlain wrote with disgust how the sons of the English aristocracy "disappear from society to make money", leading to a warped "moral compass" on their part in contrast to Germany where the Junkers either tended to their estates or had careers in the Army. Chamberlain's discussion of Britain ended with the lament that his idealised "Merry Old England" no longer existed, with Chamberlain writing:

We were merry, we are merry no longer. The complete decline of country life and the equally complete victory of God Mammon, the deity of Industry and Trade, have caused the true, harmless, refreshing merriness to betake itself out of England.

Germany by contrast in Chamberlain's view, had preserved its racial purity and by having an authoritarian government and a welfare state, had avoided both laissez-faire capitalism and Jewish rule. It was for this reason that Chamberlain alleged that Britain had started World War I in 1914 to destroy Germany.

Chamberlain received the Iron Cross from the Kaiser, with whom he was in regular correspondence, in 1916. By this time, Chamberlain's obsessive antisemitism had reached the point that Chamberlain was suffering from nightmares in which he was kidnapped and sentenced to death by the Jews. In 1915, Chamberlain wrote proudly in a letter to a friend that: "My lawyer friend in Munich tells me there is no living being whom the Jews hate more than I." In another essay, Chamberlain wrote the "pure Germanic force" had to be saved from the "disgusting worm" (the phrase "disgusting worm" was often used by Wagner to describe the Jews). Chamberlain wrote the purpose of this "struggle" was "salvation from the claws of the un-German and anti-German", going on to quote from Wagner's 1850 antisemitic essay Das Judenthum in der Musik that "Against this devil's brood stands Germany as God's champion: Siegfried against the worm!"

=== War aims ===
During the war years, Chamberlain was one of the "annexationists" who wanted the war to end with Germany annexing most of Europe, Africa and Asia to give the Reich the "world power status" he believed it deserved. As such, Chamberlain worked closely with the Pan-German League, the Conservatives and the völkische groups to mobilise public support for the maximum war aims he sought. Chamberlain was a founding member of the Independent Commission for a German Peace, and in July 1915 he signed the Address of the Intellectuals, a petition signed by 1,347 teachers, writers, professors, and theologians asking the government to win the war in order to annex as much territory as possible. Much of this propaganda including Chamberlain's essays in support of the maximum war aims had a very strong antisemitic character, as Chamberlain claimed that it was the entire German Jewish community who were supposedly seeking a compromise peace to end the war, and were preventing the full mobilization of Germany's power that would allow the Reich to win the war. In a letter to his friend Prince Maximilian of Baden, Chamberlain wrote:

I learned today from a man who is especially well-placed to observe these things—even when they go on secretly—that the Jews are completely intoxicated by their success in Germany—first from the millions they have gained through the war, then because of the praise showered on them in all official quarters, and thirdly from the protection they and their machinations enjoy from the censor. Thus, already they are beginning to lose their heads and reach a degree of insolence which may allow us to hope for a flood-tide of reaction. May God grant it!.

=== Wartime intrigues ===
In support of a harder line both in the war and on the home front, Chamberlain involved himself in the intrigues to oust Theobald von Bethmann Hollweg as Chancellor and replace him with the "hard man", Admiral Alfred von Tirpitz. In Chamberlain's opinion, if only Germany were to wage the war more ruthlessly and brutally, then the war would be won. Chamberlain loathed Bethmann Hollweg whom he saw as an inept leader who simply did not have the will to win. Chamberlain had an unbounded confidence in the ability of the Army and Navy to win the war, but on the home front, Chamberlain believed the Reich was "leaderless" as he viewed Bethmann Hollweg as a Jewish "puppet" unwilling and unable to stop defeatism, corruption or the demand for more democracy. Besides supporting Tirpitz as Chancellor, Chamberlain was all for adopting unrestricted submarine warfare—even at the risk of provoking the United States into the war—as the best way of starving Britain into surrender. Chamberlain was also a very public supporter of Zeppelin raids to destroy British cities. After a discussion with his friend and admirer, Count Ferdinand von Zeppelin, Chamberlain published a newspaper essay in July 1915 complaining that the government had imposed far too many restrictions on Zeppelin raids in order to save innocent British lives, and he argued that his country should bomb British cities with no concern for lives of civilians as ordinary British people deserved to die.

The campaign by the annexationists against Bethmann Hollweg was in large part motivated by the fact that the annexationists believed that Bethmann Hollweg was not one of them. Had Chamberlain or any of the other annexationists been aware of the secret September Programme of 1914 which laid out Germany's war aims under the assumption that Paris would soon fall, they would have had a different opinion of him. The aims included making a vassal state of Belgium, annexing Luxembourg and portions of France, expanding German colonies in Africa and increasing German influence in Eastern Europe at the expense of the Russian Empire. Bethmann Hollweg's refusal to support the annexationists in public was due to pragmatic political considerations, namely, his need for majority Social Democratic co-operation in the Reichstag as opposed to being against the annexationists as Chamberlain mistakenly believed.

Much of Chamberlain's strident, aggressive and embittered rhetoric reflected the fact that the annexationists were a minority in Germany, albeit a significant, vocal, well organised minority with many influential members inside and outside the government, but a minority nonetheless. Chamberlain regarded the refusal of the democratic parties like the left-wing SPD, the right-of-the-centre Zentrum and the liberal Progressives to join the annexationist movement as essentially high treason. By 1917 Bethmann Hollweg had turned against the idea of annexations. At the 23 April Kreuznach conference on war aims, when Hindenburg and Ludendorff pressured him to agree to annexations in France, Belgium and Russia, he refused. In July 1917 Hindenburg and Ludendorff, with the support of a significant portion of the Reichstag, successfully maneuvered to have Bethmann Hollweg dismissed and replaced with Georg Michaelis as Chancellor. Chamberlain's preferred candidate as Chancellor, Admiral Tirpitz, was passed over. Tirpitz was an intelligent, media-savvy, charismatic political intriguer with a desperate hunger for political power, but the duumvirate of Hindenburg and Ludendorff regarded Tirpitz as Chancellor as too much of a threat to their own power. The Reichstag Peace Resolution of July 1917—in which the SPD, Zentrum and the Progressives all joined forces to vote for a resolution asking the government to start peace talks at once on the basis of a return to the status quo of 1914—"inflamed the paranoia and desperation of the right. The annexationists prepared for a war to the knife against ... domestic "traitors"." Chamberlain was disappointed that Tirpitz had not been appointed Chancellor; however, he was overjoyed with Bethmann Hollweg's resignation and welcomed the increased power of Hindenburg and Ludendorff in political affairs as giving Germany the sort of government it needed. Chamberlain was always inclined to hero worship, and for him, Hindenburg and Ludendorff were the greatest of a long line of German heroes. Chamberlain wrote in 1917 that: "Had Hindenburg and Ludendorff stood on the first day in their rightful place, the peace would in all probability have been dictated in Paris before the end of 1914."

=== Postwar vision ===
Besides being an annexationist who wanted to see the war end with Germany as the world's greatest power, Chamberlain also advocated a set of wide-ranging changes to German society intended to achieve a "rebirth" of Germany. Chamberlain wanted to see the Spirit of 1914 made permanent, to convert the wartime Burgfrieden ("peace within a castle under siege") into a peacetime Volksgemeinschaft (people's community). He also wanted a new economic and social system that would be a "third way" between capitalism and socialism to bring about the Volksgemeinschaft organized along corporatist lines. To achieve this, Chamberlain called for the end to any remaining democratic features the constitution of 1871 still possessed and the creation of a pure dictatorship; for the end of the capitalist system with the state to nationalize huge sections of the economy while at the same time respecting the right to private property; and for the militarization of society on a new scale. Chamberlain was somewhat vague about how this corporatist society would work in practice, but what he wanted was rule by an oligarchy of aristocrats, intellectuals, bureaucrats and military officers who would run a "planned economy" via "scientific management". The entire German people (except for the Jews, whom Chamberlain believed did not belong in Germany) were to be united by a common loyalty to the Emperor. A fanatical monarchist, Chamberlain saw the monarchy as the bedrock of German life, writing in his 1915 book Politische Ideale: "Whoever speaks of a republic in Germany belongs on the gallows; the monarchical idea is here a holy law of life." At the same time, Chamberlain envisioned a Germany that would somehow remain the leading industrial power at the forefront of modern technology while at the same time become a romantic, agrarian society where ordinary people would work the land and retain their traditional deference to the aristocracy. Chamberlain was also vague about how this could be achieved, writing only that a "planned economy", "scientific management" and an economically interventionist state committed to social reforms would make it all possible.

=== Tensions with Wilhelm ===
After Germany's diplomatic defeat in the Second Moroccan Crisis in 1911, Wilhelm II became the Schattenkaiser (the "Shadow Emperor"), an increasingly reclusive figure who was seen less and less in public. The war further reinforced Wilhelm's tendency to avoid the public spotlight as much as possible. In private, Chamberlain grew disillusioned with his friend, complaining that instead of being the "Aryan soldier king" leading the Reich to victory, the Kaiser was a weak leader as the "Shadow Emperor" was hiding himself away in deep seclusion at his hunting lodges. As a monarchist, Chamberlain was worried about how Wilhelm was hurting his own reputation, and often vainly urged the Kaiser to appear in public more often. Chamberlain wrote in 1916 that Wilhelm had an "absolute incapability for judging character" and was now being "forced to obey a Frankfurt pimp", the last being a disparaging reference to Bethmann Hollweg. Chamberlain was always very careful to avoid attacking Wilhelm in public, but his violent press attacks against Bethmann Hollweg caused something of a rift with the Kaiser who felt Chamberlain's very public criticism of the Chancellor was also an indirect attack on him. Nonetheless, despite the strains the war imposed on their friendship, Chamberlain and Wilhelm continued to write throughout the war, but pointedly did not meet in person anymore, though Chamberlain's increasing paralysis also played a part. Wilhelm wrote to Chamberlain on 15 January 1917, stating:

The war is a struggle between two Weltanschauungen, the Teutonic-German for morality, right, loyalty and faith, genuine humanity, truth and real freedom, against ... the worship of Mammon, the power of money, pleasure, land-hunger, lies, betrayal, deceit and—last but not least—treacherous assassination! These two Weltanschauungen cannot be reconciled or tolerate one another, one must be victorious, the other must go under!

Chamberlain wrote back to Wilhelm on 20 January 1917:

England has fallen totally into the hands of the Jews and the Americans. A person does not understand this war unless he realizes that it is in the deepest sense the war of Judentum and its near relative Americanism for the control of the world—a war against Christianity, against Bildung, moral strength, uncommercial art, against every idealist perspective on life, and for the benefit of a world that would include only industry, finance, and trade—in short, unrestricted plutocracy. All the other additional factors—Russian greed, French vanity, Italian bombast, the envious and cowardly spirit of the neutrals—are whipped up, made crazy; the Jew and the Yankee are the driving forces that operate consciously and in a certain sense have hitherto been victorious or at all events successful ... It is the war of modern mechanized "civilization" against the ancient, holy and continually reborn culture of chosen races. Machines will crush both spirit and soul in their clutches.

=== Obsession with the "inner enemy" ===
Chamberlain continued to believe until the end of the war that Germany would win only if the people willed victory enough, and this sort of ideological war between "German idealism" vs. "Jewish materialism" could only end with one side utterly crushing the other. In the last two years of the war, Chamberlain became obsessed with defeating the "inner enemy" that he believed was holding Germany back. In this regard, Chamberlain frequently asserted that Germany was not one nation, but two; on one side, the "patriots" like Admiral Alfred von Tirpitz, General Erich Ludendorff, Field Marshal Paul von Hindenburg, Wolfgang Kapp, J. F. Lehmann and Count von Reventlow; and on the other, the "traitors" which included people like Philipp Scheidemann, Eduard David and Matthias Erzberger. No compromise between these two Germanies was possible or desirable, Chamberlain argued, and one would have to be destroyed. Chamberlain's wartime writings against the "inner enemy" anticipated the "stab-in-the-back legend" which emerged after 1918.

Chamberlain was a founding member of both the extreme-right, antisemitic Deutschlands Erneuerung newspaper, and of the Fatherland Party in 1917. The character of the Fatherland Party was well illustrated by an infamous incident in January 1918 when at a Fatherland Party rally in Berlin, a group of disabled war veterans were invited to debate the Fatherland Party's speakers. The wounded veterans all declared that they were now against the war and had become pacifists. The crippled veterans deplored the Fatherland Party's militarism and demand for war to go until victory, regardless of how many more would have to die or end up living with destroyed bodies. The ultra-nationalists of the Fatherland Party were so enraged by what the crippled veterans had to say that the audience stormed the stage, and beat the disabled veterans senseless. Chamberlain, who lived in Bayreuth. was not present during the Berlin rally, but expressed his approval of what had happened.

During the war, most Germans saw Britain as the main enemy, and so Chamberlain's status as the Englishman who supported the Reich made him an even more famous celebrity in Germany than he had been before 1914. Chamberlain's wartime essays were widely read. The first set of essays sold 160,000 copies within six months of publication while the second set sold 75,000 copies within six weeks of publication. Between 1914 and 1918 about 1 million copies of Chamberlain's essays were sold, making Chamberlain one of Germany's best read writers during the war. In December 1915, it was estimated that between the direct sales of Chamberlain's essays and reprints in newspapers, at least 3 million people had read Chamberlain's war-time writings.

Such was the power of Chamberlain as a public figure that in August 1916 the German Jewish industrialist Walther Rathenau—whom Chamberlain had often accused of profiteering—mailed Chamberlain a copy of his bank balance sheets, which showed that Rathenau was in fact getting poorer as a result of the war, and politely asked Chamberlain to stop accusing him of war profiteering. Rathenau's appeal made no impression, and Chamberlain continued to accuse Rathenau of war profiteering right until he was assassinated in 1922.

In 1917 Chamberlain wrote about the liberal Frankfurter Zeitung newspaper: "No knowledgeable person, can doubt that the enemy is at work among us ... whenever England has something up her sleeve against the interests of Germany, she uses the Frankfurter Zeitung." Bernhard Guttmann, the editor of the Frankfurter Zeitung sued Chamberlain for libel about that article. In August 1918, the sensational libel trial which attracted much media attention opened. Chamberlain was defended by Heinrich Class and Adolf Jacobsen. On 16 August 1918, the trial ended with the judge ruling that Chamberlain was guilty of libel and fined him 1,500 marks. The guilty verdict set off a storm in right-wing circles, who quickly held several successful fund-raisers to pay Chamberlain's fine.

== Hitler's mentor ==
=== November Revolution ===
In November 1918, Chamberlain was completely shattered by Germany's defeat in the war, a defeat he believed to be impossible, as well as by the November Revolution, which had toppled his beloved monarchy. Adding to his bitterness, Chamberlain was now so paralyzed that he could no longer leave his bed, something that he believed to be the result of poisoning by the British secret service. Chamberlain saw both the defeat and the revolution as the work of the Jews, writing in 1919 that Germany was now under the "supremacy of the Jews". In his last years, Chamberlain's antisemitic writings grew ever more violent and bloodthirsty.

In March 1920, Chamberlain supported the Kapp Putsch against the Weimar Republic, which he called the Judenrepublik ("Jewish Republic"), and was even more embittered by its failure. The Kapp putsch was defeated by a general strike called by the Social Democrats which shut down the entire German economy. A young völkisch activist Josef Stolzing-Cerny and a Chamberlain protégé who had participated in the Kapp putsch wrote to Chamberlain after its failure: "Unfortunately Kapp was not all 'the man with the lion heart', much rather the man with the beer heart, for he continually used all his energies befuddling his brain with alcohol. ... In the same situation a Bismarck or a Napoleon would have hunted the whole Jewish-socialist republic to the devil." Stolzing-Cerny went on to criticize Kapp for not unleashing the Freikorps Marinebrigade Ehrhardt which had taken Berlin against the Jews of Berlin, instead ordering the Freikorps to keep order. After the failure of the putsch, Chamberlain no longer considered Wolfgang Kapp to be one of his heroes, and instead damned him as a weak-willed coward all too typical of German conservatives who talked tough, but never followed up their words with action. More importantly, the failure of the Kapp putsch to a certain extent discredited traditional German conservatism in Chamberlain's eyes, and led him on the search for a more radical alternative, a type of "German socialism" that would offer a "third way" between capitalism and socialism.

=== Admiring Hitler ===
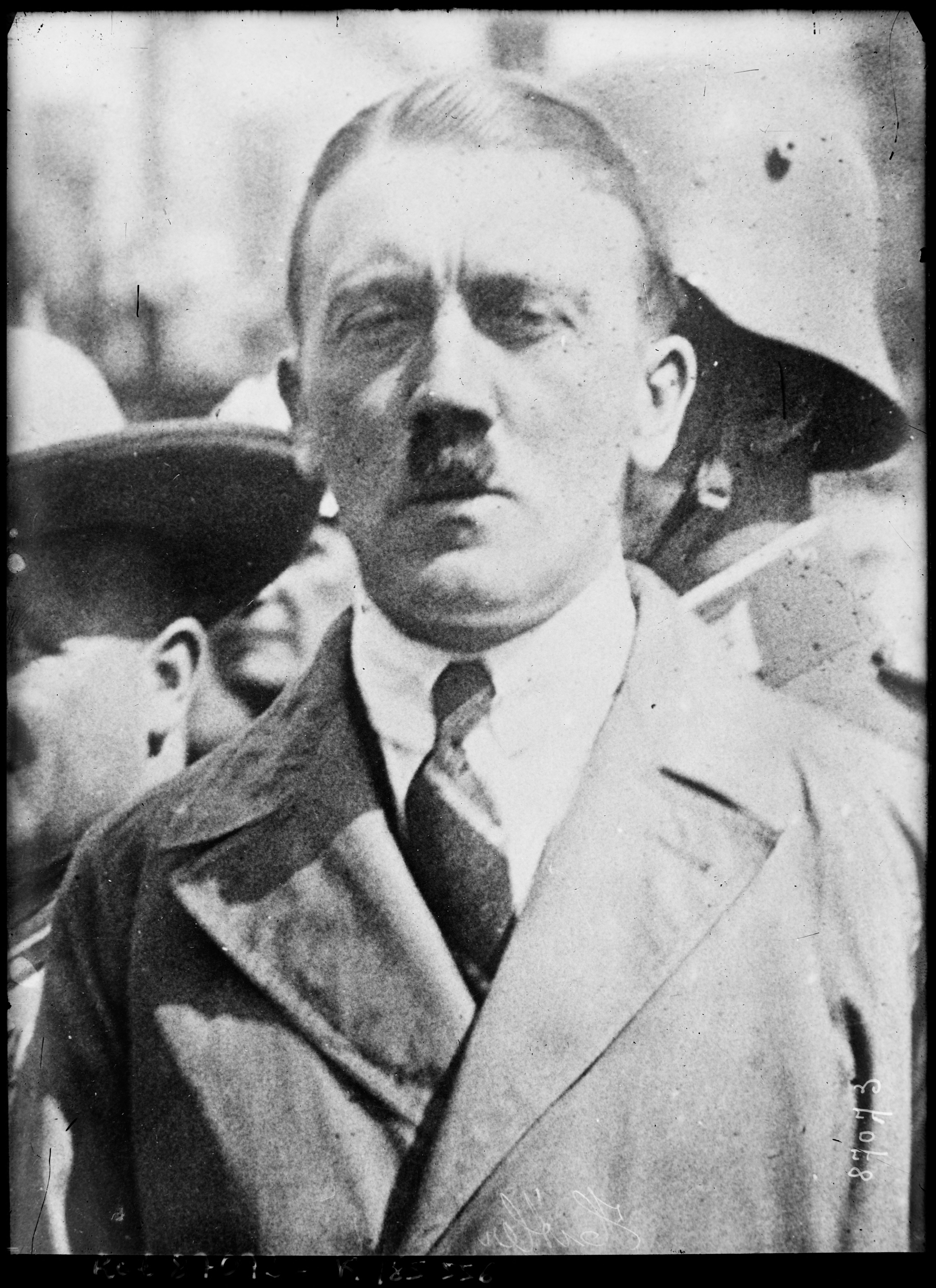
Adolf Hitler in 1923

In January 1921, Stolzing-Cerny, who joined the NSDAP in December 1920, wrote to Chamberlain about the new man on the political scene, "one Adolf Hitler, an Austrian worker, a man of extraordinary oratorical talents and an astonishingly rich political knowledge who knows marvelously how to thrill the masses". Initially, Chamberlain was hesitant about Hitler, believing that he might be another Kapp, but after the "battle of Coburg", in which Hitler had personally fought with his followers in a street battle against the Communists, Chamberlain started to see Hitler as someone who practised what he preached. From that time onwards, Chamberlain started to closely follow and admire Hitler, whom he saw as "Germany's savior". Hitler in his turn had read The Foundations, Chamberlain's biography of Wagner, and many of his wartime essays, and was much influenced by all that Chamberlain had written. British historian Sir Ian Kershaw, a biographer of Hitler, writes that Hitler "drew heavily for his ideas" from the writings of Houston Stewart Chamberlain, as well as from other antisemitic authors such as Adolf Wahrmund and Theodor Fritsch.

The fact that Hitler was an ardent Wagnerite who adored Wagner's music gave Chamberlain and Hitler a mutual ground for friendship beyond their shared hatred of the Jews. Likewise, Joseph Goebbels had been converted to the völkisch ideology after reading Chamberlain's books and essays, and came to the conclusion on the basis of Chamberlain's writings that the West could only be saved by removing the Jews from German society. During this period, Chamberlain, who was practically a member of the Wagner family, started to push for the Bayreuth Festival to become openly identified with völkisch politics, and to turn the previously apolitical festival into a völkisch rally.

Despite his paralysis, Chamberlain whose mind was still sharp, remained active as a writer, maintaining a correspondence with a whole gamut of figures from Admiral Alfred von Tirpitz to the radical antisemitic journalist Theodor Fritsch, the leader of the völkisch Hammerbund ("Hammer League"). From his exile in the Netherlands, the former Kaiser wrote to Chamberlain in 1922 to tell him that thanks to his essays, he had become a Marcionist and now rejected the Old Testament. Wilhelm claimed that on the basis of Chamberlain's work, he now knew that what had become the Old Testament was in fact a Zoroastrian text from ancient Persia and was therefore "Aryan". The former Kaiser claimed that the Jews had stolen and rewritten this sacred text from the Aryan Persians, ending his letter: "Let us free ourselves from the Judentum with its Jawe!" In 1923, Wilhelm wrote to tell Chamberlain of his belief that not only were the Jews "not our religious forebears", but that Jesus was "not a Jew", was instead an Aryan "of exceptional beauty, tall and slim with a noble face inspiring respect and love; his hair blond shading into chestnut brown, his arms and hands noble and exquisitely formed".

In 1923 Chamberlain met Adolf Hitler in Bayreuth, and in September he sat in his wheelchair next to Hitler during the völkisch "German Day" paramilitary parade. In September 1923 he wrote a grateful and highly admiring open letter to the NSDAP leader. Chamberlain, paralysed and despondent after Germany's losses in World War I, wrote to Hitler after his first visit in September 1923:

Most respected and dear Hitler ... It is hardly surprising that a man like that can give peace to a poor suffering spirit! Especially when he is dedicated to the service of the fatherland. My faith in Germandom has not wavered for a moment, though my hopes were—I confess—at a low ebb. With one stroke you have transformed the state of my soul. That Germany, in the hour of her greatest need, brings forth a Hitler—that is proof of her vitality ... that the magnificent Ludendorff openly supports you and your movement: What wonderful confirmation! I can now go untroubled to sleep ... May God protect you!

Chamberlain's letter—which made him into the first celebrity to endorse the NSDAP—caused a media sensation in Germany and led Hitler to rejoice "like a child" at the news. When Hitler staged the Munich Beer Hall Putsch in November 1923, Chamberlain wrote an essay for the Völkischer Beobachter entitled "God Wills It!" calling on all Germans who love Germany to join the putsch. After the failure of the Munich Putsch, Chamberlain wrote: "We are deeply affected by this tragic fate, Jew and Jesuit can now triumph again!".

=== Joining the Nazis ===
Chamberlain joined the Nazi Party and contributed to its publications. Its primary journal, the Völkischer Beobachter, dedicated five columns to praising him on his 70th birthday, describing The Foundations as the "gospel of the National Socialist movement". In January 1924, Chamberlain published an essay praising Hitler as one of the "rare beautiful beings ... a man of genuine simplicity with a fascinating gaze" whose words "always come directly from the heart". Chamberlain praised Hitler for embarking upon a "Vernichtungskrieg" ("war of destruction") against all of Germany's enemies. Chamberlain further wrote about Hitler—whom he viewed as the greatest of all his heroes—that:

Because he [Hitler] is no mere phrasemonger, but consistently pursues his thought to an end and draws his conclusions from it, he recognizes and proclaims that one cannot simultaneously embrace Jesus and those that crucified him. That is the splendid thing about Hitler—his courage! ... In this respect he reminds one of Luther. And whence come the courage of these two men? It derives from the holy seriousness each has for the cause! Hitler utters no word he does not mean in earnest; his speeches contain no padding or vague, provisional statements ... but the result of this is that he is decried as a visionary dreamer. People consider Hitler a dreamer whose head is full of impossible schemes and yet a renowned and original historian called him "the most creative mind since Bismarck in the area of statecraft." I believe ... we are all inclined to view those things as impractical that we do not already see accomplished before us. He, for example, finds it impossible to share our conviction about the pernicious, even murderous influence of Jewry on the German Volk and not to take action; if one sees the danger, then steps must be taken against it with utter dispatch. I daresay everyone recognizes this, but nobody risks speaking out; nobody ventures to extract the consequences of his thoughts for his actions; nobody except Hitler. ... This man has worked like a divine blessing, cheering hearts, opening men's eyes to clearly seen goals, enlivening their spirits, kindling their capacity for love and for indignation, hardening their courage and resoluteness. Yet we still need him badly: May God who sent him to us preserve him for many years as a "blessing for the German Fatherland!"

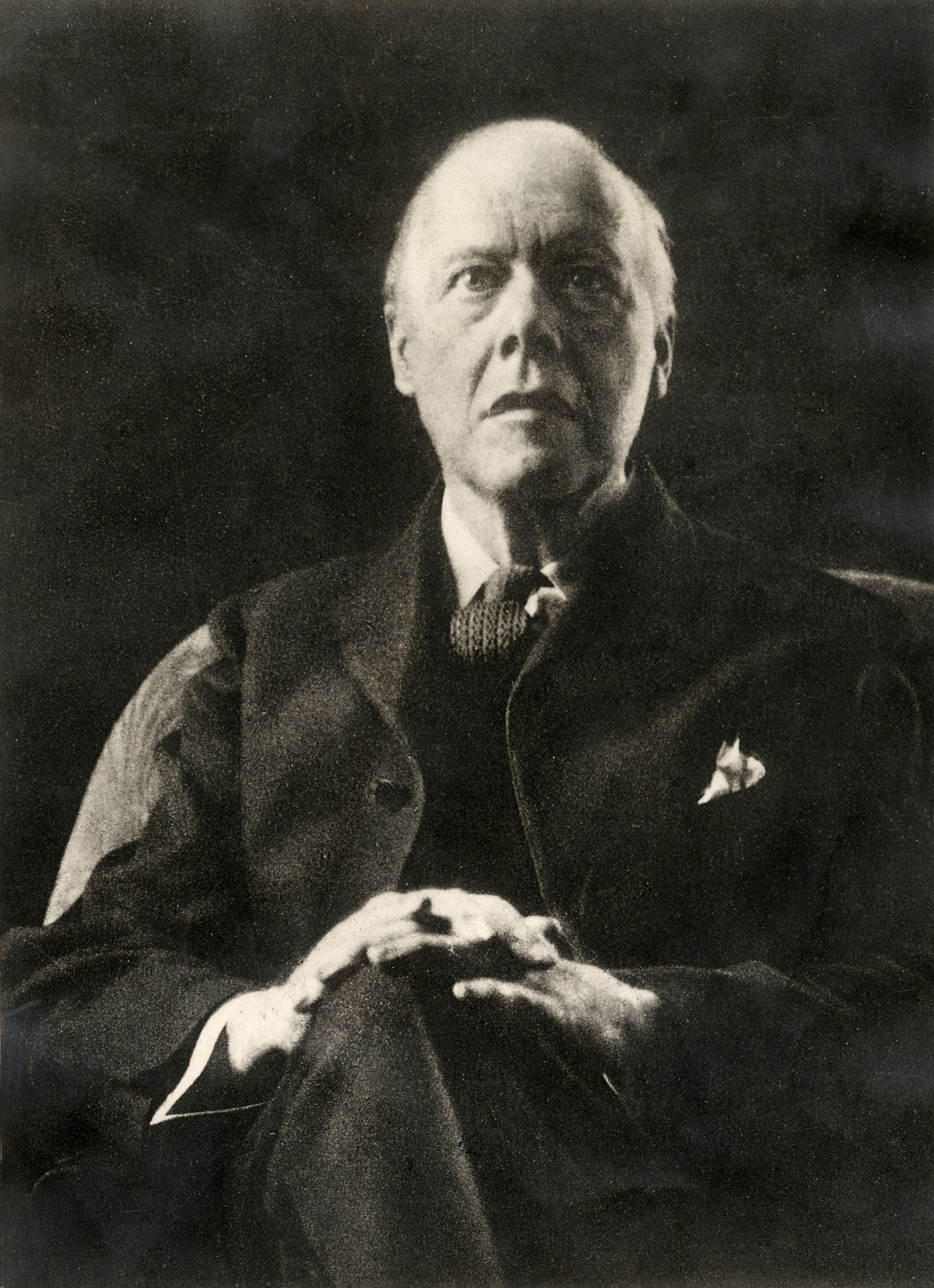
Chamberlain in 1926

After the failure of the Munich Putsch, Hitler was convicted of high treason and imprisoned. When the 1924 Bayreuth Festival opened, Chamberlain's efforts to identify the festival with völkisch politics finally bore fruit. The Bayreuth Festspielhaus opera house and the way leading up to it were decorated with völkisch symbols like the swastika, parades by the nationalist Verbände were held outside the Festspielhügel, prominent völkisch leaders like General Erich Ludendorff appeared on the stage to give a speech attacking the Weimar Republic before one of the operas was performed, and a petition was offered to the audiences demanding that Hitler be pardoned. The 1924 festival led to 10,000 people in one night signing the petition asking for Hitler's release. From his prison cell at Landsberg prison, Hitler wrote to Siegfried Wagner expressing his sorrow about being unable to attend his beloved Bayreuth Festival and to express his thanks to the entire Wagner family and Chamberlain for turning the Bayreuth festival into a völkisch rally, adding that when he got out of prison, he would come to Bayreuth as "the first witness and herald" of Germany's rebirth. Hitler stated this would be the best medicine for Chamberlain's health as "the road to Berlin" started in Bayreuth. In May 1926, one year before Chamberlain's death, Hitler and Goebbels visited him in Bayreuth. Chamberlain assured Hitler of his belief that he was the "chosen one" destined to lead Germany back to greatness after the defeat of 1918, to make the Reich a world power, and finally smash the Jews. Much of Hitler's genuine affection for Chamberlain was due to the fact that Chamberlain never lost his faith in Hitler's potential, even at time in the mid-1920s when the NSDAP was faring very poorly.

=== Death ===
Chamberlain continued living in Bayreuth until his death in 1927. Chamberlain died on 9 January 1927 and his ashes were buried at the Bayreuth cemetery in the presence of Hitler along with several highly ranked members of the Nazi Party.

== Impact of The Foundations ==
During his lifetime Chamberlain's works were read widely throughout Europe, and especially in Germany. His reception was particularly favourable among Germany's conservative elite. Kaiser Wilhelm II patronised Chamberlain, distributing copies of The Foundations of the Nineteenth Century among the German Army, and seeing that The Foundations was carried in German libraries and included in the school curricula. In 1932 in an essay entitled "Anti-Semitics" denouncing antisemitism, the "homeless left" German journalist Carl von Ossietzky wrote:

Intellectual anti-Semitism was the special prerogative of Houston Stewart Chamberlain, who, in The Foundations of the Nineteenth Century, concretized the fantasies of Count Arthur de Gobineau, which had penetrated to Bayreuth. He translated them from the language of harmless snobbery into [the language] of a modernized, seductive mysticism.

Ossietzky ended his essay with the warning: "Today there is a strong smell of blood in the air. Literary anti-Semitism forges the moral weapon for murder. Sturdy and honest lads will take care of the rest."

The Foundations would prove to be a seminal work in German nationalism. Due to its success, aided by Chamberlain's association with the Wagner circle, its ideas of Aryan supremacy and a struggle against Jewish influence spread widely across the German state at the beginning of the century. If it did not form the framework of later Nazi ideology, at the very least it provided its adherents with a seeming intellectual justification. Many of Chamberlain's ideas such as his emphasis on a racial struggle between Aryans vs. Jews for world domination; his championing of "world power status" for Germany; his call for a "planned economy" (something realized in 1936 when Hitler brought in the First Four Year Plan which saw the German state take over the economy); his vision of Germany becoming the Volksgemeinschaft (people's community"); his demand for a "third way" between capitalism and socialism; his total opposition to democracy; and his nostalgia for an agrarian lifestyle were central to Nazism. The only Nazi idea that Chamberlain missed was Lebensraum (living space), the perceived need for Germany to colonize Eastern Europe while displacing the existing population to make room for Aryan colonists. However, there were differences in that Chamberlain was always a monarchist and believed that when his friend Hitler came to power, he would restore the monarchy and put his other friend Wilhelm II back on the throne. Moreover, Chamberlain was just one of the many völkische thinkers who influenced Hitler.

Adolf Hitler, while still growing as a political figure in Germany, visited him several times (in 1923 and in 1926, together with Joseph Goebbels) at the Wagner family's property in Bayreuth. Chamberlain's ideas particularly influenced Alfred Rosenberg, who became the Nazi Party's in-house philosopher. In 1909, some months before his 17th birthday, Rosenberg picked up a copy of Chamberlain's The Foundations and wrote of the moment: "I felt electrified; I wrote down the title and went straight to the bookshop." In 1930 Rosenberg published The Myth of the Twentieth Century, a homage to and continuation of Chamberlain's work. Rosenberg had accompanied Hitler when he called upon Wagner's widow, Cosima, in October 1923 when he met her son-in-law. Hitler told the ailing Chamberlain he was working on his own book which, he intended, should do for Weimar-era Germany what Chamberlain's book had done for Imperial Germany.

Beyond the Kaiser and the NSDAP, assessments were mixed. The French Germanic scholar Edmond Vermeil considered Chamberlain's ideas "essentially shoddy", but the anti-Nazi German author Konrad Heiden, despite objections to Chamberlain's racial ideas, described him as "one of the most astonishing talents in the history of the German mind, a mine of knowledge and profound ideas". In a 1939 work Martin Heidegger (himself a former Nazi) dismissed Chamberlain's work as presenting a subjective, individualistic Weltanschauung (fabricated worldview).

== Works ==
- (1892). Das Drama Richard Wagners. Eine Anregung, Breitkopf & Härtel.
- (1895). Richard Wagner, F. Bruckmann.
- (1899). Die Grundlagen des neunzehnten Jahrhunderts, Bruckmann.
- (1903). Dilettantismus - Rasse - Monotheismus - Rom, Bruckmann.
- (1905). Arische Weltanschauung, Bruckmann.
- (1903). Heinrich von Stein und seine Weltanschauung, Georg Heinrich Meyer.
- (1905). Immanuel Kant. Die Persönlichkeit als Einführung in das Werk, Berlin, Bard, Marquardt & Co.
- (1912). Wehr und Gegenwehr. Vorworte zu dritten und zur vierten Auflage der Grundlagen des 19. Jahrhunderts, Bruckmann.
- (1913). Parsifal-Märchen, Bruckmann.
- (1912). Goethe, Bruckmann.
- (1914). Kriegsaufsätze, Bruckmann.
- (1915). Worte Christi, Bruckmann.
- (1915). Who is to blame for the War?, New York : German-American Literary Defense Committee
- (1915). Wer hat den Krieg verschuldet?, Wiesbaden : Volksbildungsverein
- (1915). Politische Ideale, Bruckmann.
- (1915). England und Deutschland, Bruckmann.
- (1915). Die Zuversicht, Bruckmann.
- (1915). Who is to blame for the war?, The German-American Literary Defense Committee.
- (1915). Neue Kriegsaufsätze, Bruckmann.
- (1915). Bühnendichtungen, Bruckmann.
- (1916). Deutsches Wesen, Bruckmann.
- (1916). Ideal und Macht, Bruckmann.
- (1916). Hammer oder Ambos, Bruckmann.
- (1916). Demokratie und Freiheit, Bruckmann.
- (1916). Der Wille zum Sieg, Hamburg : Deutschnationale Buchhandlung
- (1918). Rasse und Nation, München : I. F. Lehmanns Verlag
- (1918). Der demokratische Wahn : Zeugnisse aus England, Frankreich, den Vereinigten Staaten, Deutschland, Bruckmann.
- (1919). Lebenswege meines Denkens, Bruckmann.
- (1921). Mensch und Gott, Bruckmann.
- (1922). Herrn Hinkebein's Schädel : Gedankenhumoreske, Bruckmann.
- (1923). Drei Vorworte, Bruckmann.
- (1923). Rasse und Persönlichkeit, Bruckmann.
- (1928). Natur und Leben, Bruckmann.
- (1928). Briefe 1882-1924 und Briefwechsel mit Kaiser Wilhelm II, 2 Bände, Bruckmann.
- (1933). Chamberlain der Seher des dritten Reiches: das Vermächtnis H. S. Chamberlain an das Deutsche Volk in einer Auslese aus seinen Werken, Bruckmann.
- (1934). Houston Stewart Chamberlain - Auswahl aus seinen Werken, Breslau : Ferdinand Hirt
- (1937). Mein Weg nach Bayreuth. Mit Einleitung von Paul Bülow, Bruckmann.

=== Works in English translation ===
- (1897). Richard Wagner, J.M. Dent & Co. (translated by G. Ainslie Hight)
- (1911). The Foundations of the Nineteenth Century, 2 vols., John Lane, The Bodley Head (translated by John Lees)
  - "Foundations of the Nineteenth Century." In Modern Political Ideologies, Oxford University Press, 1959.
- (1914). Immanuel Kant, 2 vols., John Lane, The Bodley Head (translated by Lord Redesdale). ISBN 978-1293035108
- (1923). The Wagnerian Drama, John Lane, The Bodley Head. ISBN 978-1909606029
- (1915). The Ravings of a Renegade, Jarrold & Sons (translated by Charles H. Clarke) ISBN 978-1331004073
- (2005). Political Ideals, University Press of America (translated by Alexander Jacob) ISBN 978-0761829126
- (2012). Aryan World View, Aristeus books. ISBN 978-1479223039
- (2012). The Ravings of a Renegade, Aristeus Books (translated by Charles H. Clarke) ISBN 978-1479231584
- (2014). Richard Wagner, Aristeus Books (translated by G. Ainslie High) ISBN 978-1502494689

== See also ==
- Oswald Mosley
- Wagner family tree
- William Patrick Stuart-Houston
