= Hüsing =

Hüsing is a surname. Notable people with the surname include:

- Georg Hüsing (1869–1930), Austrian philologist
- Oliver Hüsing (born 1993), German footballer
