= Neville Bowles Chamberlain =

Senior Indian Army officer

Field Marshal Sir Neville Bowles Chamberlain GCB, GCSI
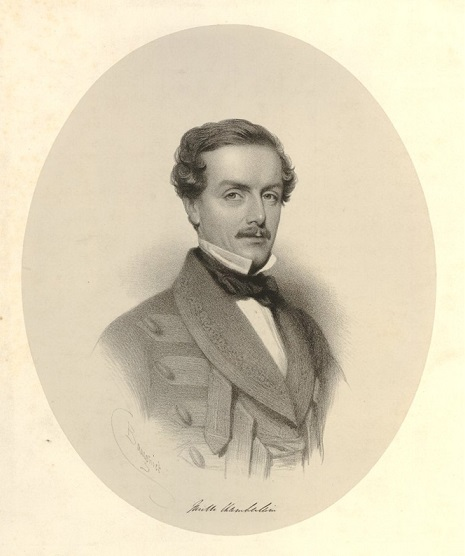
- Born: 10 January 1820; Rio de Janeiro, Brazil
- Died: 18 February 1902 (aged 82); Lordswood, Hampshire, United Kingdom
- Spouse: Charlotte Cuyler Reid (m. 1873; died 1896)
- Relatives: Sir Henry Chamberlain, 1st Baronet (father)
- Military career
- Allegiance: East India Company (British Raj) British India
- Branch: Bengal Army; Madras Army
- Service years: 1837–1886
- Rank: Field Marshal
- Commands: Madras Army
- Conflicts: First Anglo-Afghan War; Gwalior campaign Second Anglo-Sikh War; Indian Rebellion; Ambela campaign (WIA); Second Anglo-Afghan War
- Awards: Knight Grand Cross of the Order of the Bath; Knight Grand Commander of the Order of the Star of India

Field Marshal Sir Neville Bowles Chamberlain GCB, GCSI (10 January 1820 – 18 February 1902) was a British general in British India. He served in the Bengal Army and saw action in the First Anglo-Afghan War, Gwalior campaign, Second Anglo-Sikh War, Indian Rebellion, Ambela campaign and Second Anglo-Afghan War. He later became Commander-in-chief of the Madras Army, and was promoted to field marshal.

== Background and early life ==
Chamberlain was born in Rio de Janeiro, the third son of Sir Henry Chamberlain, 1st Baronet, consul general and charge d'affaires in Brazil, and his second wife Anna Eugenia née Morgan. His elder brother, William Charles Chamberlain, was an admiral, while younger brothers Crawford Chamberlain, and Charles Francis Falcon Chamberlain, were also army officers.

He was raised in England and educated by a private tutor and at school in Shooter's Hill, London. In 1833 he entered the Royal Military Academy, Woolwich, having been nominated for a cadetship by Lord Beresford but was withdrawn after a year when it became clear he was unlikely to pass the final examinations. During his time at Woolwich he earned a reputation for fighting and rebellious behaviour, and on his return home he threatened to join the British Legion, a body of troops leaving for Spain under Sir George de Lacy Evans. Instead, he was encouraged to pursue a career in India, and with help from his late father's contacts he was commissioned as an ensign in the Bengal Native Infantry on 24 February 1837.

== India ==
Chamberlain embarked for India on board the ship George and arrived at Madras in May 1837. He remained at Madras for a short time as the guest of the retired general Sir John Doveton before continuing on to Calcutta in June. In Calcutta, Chamberlain stayed with his uncle George and his aunt whilst he acclimatised to his new home. In November he left Calcutta to join the 12th Regiment at Barrackpore and three months later he was posted to Lucknow with the 55th Regiment.

In mid 1838, he was transferred to the 16th Regiment based at Delhi who were preparing for the First Anglo-Afghan War. His regiment was to become part of the Army of the Indus, serving in the 1st Brigade 1st Division under the command of Sir Willoughby Cotton. He was present at a number of engagements including the Battle of Ghazni in July 1839 and was wounded on several occasions. Promoted to lieutenant on 16 July 1842, he transferred to the 1st Cavalry of Shah Shujah's Contingent and took part in a march from Kandahar to Kabul in August 1842. During the withdrawal from Kabul he was again wounded at Landi Kotal in October 1842 and again at Ali Masjid in November 1842.

He became attached to the Governor-General's Bodyguard in January 1843 and took part in the Battle of Maharajpur in December 1843 during the Gwalior campaign. Chamberlain became military secretary to the Governor of Bombay in late 1846 and then brigade major with the Bengal Irregular Cavalry in 1848.

== Punjab ==
He took part in the Battle of Chillianwala in January 1849 and the Battle of Gujrat in February 1849 during the Second Anglo-Sikh War. He became assistant adjutant-general of the Sirhind division in May 1849 and, having been promoted to captain in the 16th Bengal Native Infantry on 1 November 1849 and to brevet major on 2 November 1849, he became assistant commissioner in the Rawalpindi District in December 1849 and then assistant commissioner in the Hazara District in June 1850. Promoted to lieutenant-colonel on 28 November 1854, he was given the command of the Punjab Irregular Frontier Force and led several expeditions against the frontier tribes.

== Indian Rebellion of 1857 ==
During the Indian Rebellion he served as Adjutant-General of the Indian Army and was severely wounded at the Siege of Delhi in July 1857. For this he was appointed a Companion of the Order of the Bath on 11 November 1857 and promoted to colonel on 27 November 1857.

Chamberlain was reappointed to the command of the Punjab Irregular Frontier Force in 1858 and led it during the Ambela Campaign during which he was again severely wounded again in November 1863. Advanced to Knight Commander of the Order of the Bath on 11 April 1863, he returned to the United Kingdom and was promoted to major-general for distinguished service on 5 August 1864. He was appointed a Knight Commander of the Order of the Star of India on 24 May 1866 and accompanied the Duke of Edinburgh on an official trip to India in 1869. He was promoted to lieutenant-general on 1 May 1872, advanced to Knight Grand Commander of the Order of the Star of India on 24 May 1873 and further advanced to Knight Grand Cross of the Order of the Bath on 28 May 1875.

Chamberlain became Commander-in-chief of the Madras Army in February 1876 and, having been promoted to full general on 1 October 1877, was sent on a mission to the Emir of Afghanistan, Sher Ali Khan, whose refusal to allow him, along with Major Louis Cavagnari, to enter the country precipitated the Second Anglo-Afghan War in November 1878. He was a member of the Madras Legislative Council and, for several months, acting military member of the council of the Governor-General of India. He left India in February 1881 and retired to Lordswood near Southampton in February 1886.

== Later life and death ==
In retirement, Chamberlain was an active member of the Southampton Unitarian Church. He was a vocal critic of British policy during the Boer War between 1899 and 1901. He was promoted to field marshal on 25 April 1900, died at Lordswood on 18 February 1902 and was buried at Rownhams near Southampton.

== Family ==
In 1873, Chamberlain married Charlotte Cuyler Reid, daughter of Major-General Sir William Reid, who died in 1896; there were no children.

== Sources ==
- Forrest, G. W. (1909). Life of Field-Marshal Sir Neville Chamberlain. Edinburgh: William Blackwood and Sons.
- Heathcote, Anthony (1999). The British Field Marshals 1736 - 1997. Leo Cooper. ISBN 0-85052-696-5.

Military offices
Preceded by Sir Frederick Haines	C-in-C, Madras Army; 1876–1880	Succeeded by Sir Frederick Roberts
