= Crawford Chamberlain =

English general (1821–1902)

General Sir Crawford Chamberlain GCIE, CSI
- Born: 9 May 1821
- Died: 13 December 1902 (aged 81); Southampton
- Spouses: Elizabeth de Witt (died 1894); Augusta Margaret Christie
- Relatives: Sir Henry Chamberlain, 1st Baronet (father)
- Military career
- Allegiance: United Kingdom
- Branch: British Indian Army
- Service years: 1837–1884
- Rank: General
- Commands: Gwalior District; Oudh Division
- Conflicts: First Anglo-Afghan War; First Anglo-Sikh War; Second Anglo-Sikh War; Indian Rebellion
- Awards: Knight Commander of the Order of the Indian Empire; Companion of the Order of the Star of India

General Sir Crawford Trotter Chamberlain GCIE CSI (1821–1902) was a senior officer in the Indian Staff Corps.

== Early life ==
Born in London on 9 May 1821, was the third son of Sir Henry Chamberlain, 1st Baronet by his second wife. Sir Neville Bowles Chamberlain was an elder brother. After education at private schools and under tutors Crawford obtained a cadetship in the Bengal army in 1837, and was posted to the 28th Bengal infantry. From this corps, he was transferred to the 16th Bengal infantry.

== Afghan and Sikh Wars ==
With the outbreak of the First Anglo-Afghan War in 1839 Chamberlain's active service began. He was present at the siege of Ghazni (23 July 1839) and at the operations around Kandahar. In September 1841 he was appointed to the command of the 5th Janbaz cavalry, and in the following month, he became adjutant of Christie's horse. Until the end of the Afghan campaign, he was engaged in constant heavy fighting.

In 1843 Chamberlain was sent to Scinde with two squadrons of Christie's horse as an independent command, to be known as Chamberlain's horse. In 1845 he was invalided to the Cape of Good Hope, where he married. Next year he returned to India as second in command of the 9th irregular cavalry, into which his own corps had been absorbed. During the First Anglo-Sikh War and the Second Anglo-Sikh War he was constantly in action. He was at the battle of Chillian walla on 13 January 1849, receiving the medal and clasp. On 30 January he was again engaged in the neighbourhood; here he was wounded and was made the subject of a special despatch by Lord Gough (31 January). At the Battle of Gujrat on 21 February, he had to be lifted into the saddle, where he remained throughout the day. He was awarded the clasp, was mentioned in despatches, and, being promoted to captain and brevet major in November 1849, was given the command of the 1st irregular cavalry, formerly Skinner's Horse. He served with them in the Mohmand expedition of 1854 and received a medal and clasp.

== Indian Rebellion of 1857 ==
On the outbreak of the Indian Rebellion, Chamberlain's men volunteered to shoot condemned rebels at Jullundur (4 June 1857). He was given the duty of disarming the 62nd and 69th regiments at Multan. At Chichawatni (September) Chamberlain was attacked by a superior force of the enemy, and housed his cavalry in a caravanserai. He held out until he was relieved three days later.

For his services, Chamberlain was promoted to lieutenant-colonel. In April 1862 he was made colonel.

== Later life ==
In 1864 Chamberlain was appointed honorary A.D.C. to the governor-general, and two years later was made Companion of the Order of the Star of India (CSI), and was included in the first list of twelve officers for good service pension. In 1866, too, he was transferred to the command of the central Indian horse, and next year to the command of the Gwalior district with the rank of brigadier-general.

In 1869 Chamberlain was officiating political agent at Gwalior; from October 1869 to February 1870 he was acting political agent at the court of Scindia until his promotion to major-general. During his unemployed time as major-general he served on various commissions and courts of inquiry, and from 1874 to 1879 he commanded the Oudh division. He became lieutenant-general in October 1877 and general in January 1880.

In 1880 Chamberlain returned to England for the first time since 1837. In 1884 he was retired from the active list. In 1897, on the occasion of Queen Victoria's diamond jubilee, he was made Knight Grand Commander of the Order of the Indian Empire (GCIE).

He died at his residence, Lordswood, Southampton, on 13 December 1902, and was buried at Rownhams.

== Family ==
Chamberlain married twice:

1. in 1845, at the Cape, to Elizabeth de Witt, daughter of J. de Witt; she died on 19 January 1894; and
2. in 1896 to Augusta Margaret Christie, daughter of Major-General John Christie, C.B., who survived him.

There was no issue by either marriage.
