= Chamberlain baronets =

Extinct baronetcy in the Baronetage of the United Kingdom

The Chamberlain Baronetcy was created for Henry Chamberlain in the Baronetage of the United Kingdom on 22 February 1828.

== Chamberlain baronets, of London (1828) ==
Escutcheon of the Chamberlain baronets of London

- Sir Henry Chamberlain, 1st Baronet (1773 – 31 July 1829)
- Sir Henry Chamberlain, 2nd Baronet (2 October 1796 – 8 September 1843)
- Sir Henry Orlando Robert Chamberlain, 3rd Baronet (15 December 1828 – 30 December 1870)
- Sir Henry Hamilton Erroll Chamberlain, 4th Baronet (22 November 1857 – 28 June 1936)
- Sir Henry Wilmot Chamberlain, 5th Baronet (17 May 1899 – 24 December 1980). Extinct on his death.

Baronetage of the United Kingdom
Preceded by Philips baronets	Chamberlain baronets of London; 22 February 1828	Succeeded by Drummond baronets
