= Sir Henry Chamberlain, 1st Baronet =

British diplomat

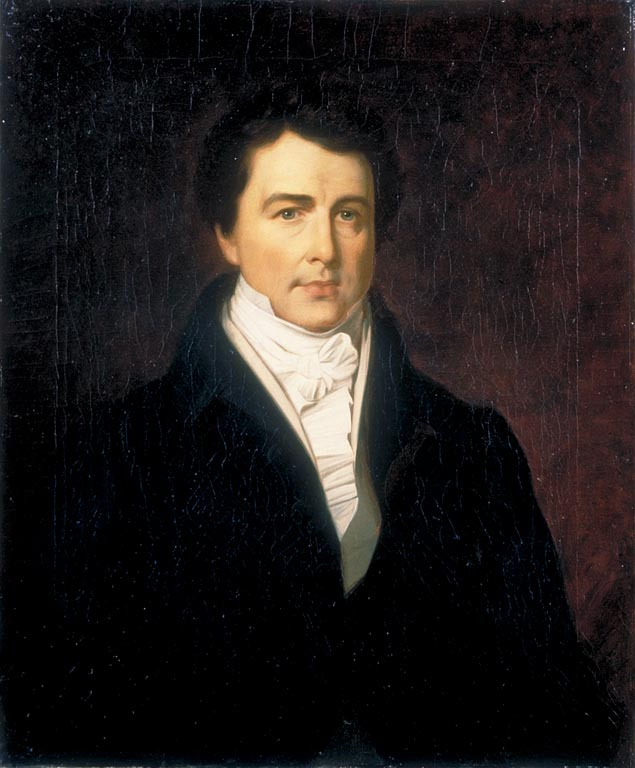
Sir Henry Chamberlain, 1st Baronet

Sir Henry Chamberlain, 1st Baronet (1773– 31 July 1829) was a British diplomat, consul general to Portugal and chargé d'affaires to Brazil. He was created a baronet on 22 February 1828.

Henry was a natural son of the Honourable Henry Fane, Clerk to H.M. Treasury, a younger son of Thomas Fane, 8th Earl of Westmorland. He was brought up with the rest of Fane's children as a supposed distant relative, but when Chamberlain expressed interest in one of Fane's daughters (his half sister), he was informed of his true parentage, moved quickly to Portugal, later to be posted to Brazil ca 1813 to become consul general, sailing on board HMS Briton.

On 1 January 1795 he married firstly Elizabeth Harrod, of Exeter, and in 1813 they were divorced by an Act of Parliament. Their children were:

- Sir Henry Chamberlain, 2nd Baronet (2 October 1796 – 8 September 1843)
- William Augustus Chamberlain (1797–1806)
- Eliza Caroline Chamberlain (d. 11 December 1887), who on 2 December 1819 married the Hon. Charles Orlando Bridgeman RN (died 13 April 1860), second son of Orlando Bridgeman, 1st Earl of Bradford.

On 5 June 1813 Henry Chamberlain married secondly Anne Eugenia, a daughter of William Morgan. Their children were:

- Anne Beresford Chamberlain (born 1815, Rio de Janeiro)
- Harriett Mary Chamberlain (born 1816, Rio de Janeiro)
- William Charles Chamberlain (21 April 1818 – 1878), born Rio de Janeiro Rear Admiral, R.N.
- Neville Bowles Chamberlain (10 January 1820 – 1902), born Rio de Janeiro, Field Marshal, British Army
- Crawford Trotter Chamberlain (1821–1902), General of the Indian Staff Corps
- Thomas H. Chamberlain (13 September 1822), born Rio de Janeiro
- Charles Francis Falcon Chamberlain (1826–1870), Lieutenant-Colonel in the Indian Army

== Sources ==
- Burke's Peerage, Baronetage and Knightage, edited by Peter Townend, 105th edition, London. 1970. p. 516.
- Leigh Rayment's list of baronets
- Baptismal Register of Christ Church, Rio de Janeiro

== Footnotes ==
Baronetage of the United Kingdom
| New creation | Baronet (of London); 1828–1829 | Succeeded by Henry Chamberlain |
