= Basil Hall Chamberlain =

British academic (1850–1935)

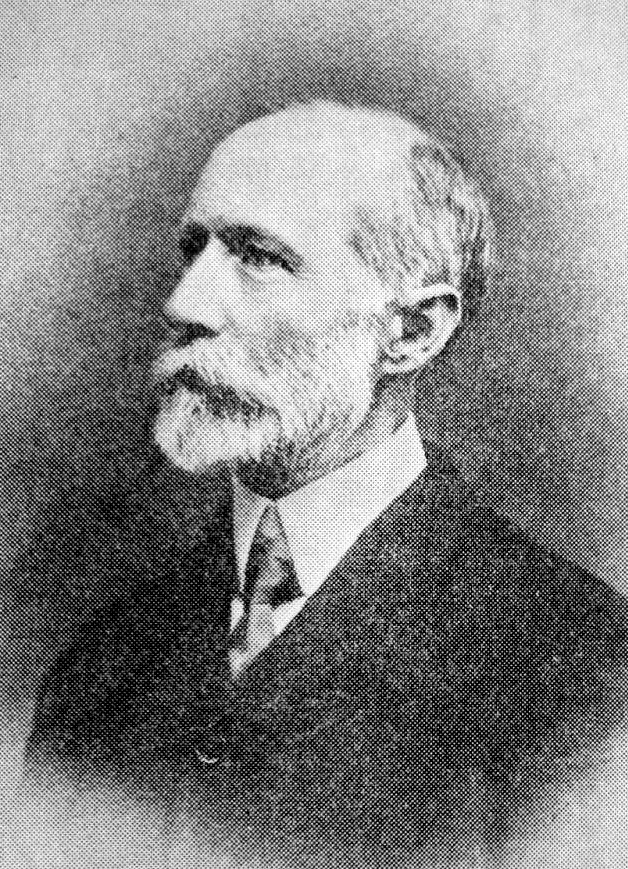
- Basil Hall Chamberlain
- Born: 18 October 1850; Southsea, England
- Died: 15 February 1935 (aged 84); Geneva, Switzerland
- Occupations: Author, Japanologist
- Parent(s): William Charles Chamberlain; Eliza Jane Hall

Basil Hall Chamberlain (18 October 1850 – 15 February 1935) was a British academic and Japanologist. He was a professor of the Japanese language at Tokyo Imperial University and one of the foremost British Japanologists active in Japan during the late 19th century. (Others included Ernest Satow and W. G. Aston.) He also wrote some of the earliest translations of haiku into English. He is perhaps best remembered for his informal and popular one-volume encyclopedia Things Japanese, which first appeared in 1890 and which he revised several times thereafter. His interests were diverse, and his works include an anthology of poetry in French.

== Early life ==
Chamberlain was born in Southsea (a part of Portsmouth) on the south coast of England, the son of an Admiral William Charles Chamberlain and his wife Eliza Hall, the daughter of the travel writer Basil Hall. His younger brother was Houston Stewart Chamberlain. He was brought up speaking French as well as English, even before moving to Versailles to live with his maternal grandmother in 1856 upon his mother's death. Once in France, he acquired German as well. Chamberlain had hoped to study at Oxford, but instead started work at Barings Bank in London. He was unsuited to the work and soon had a nervous breakdown. It was in the hope of a full recovery that he sailed out of Britain, with no clear destination in mind.

== Japan ==
Chamberlain landed in Japan on 29 May 1873, employed by the Japanese government as an o-yatoi gaikokujin. He taught at the Imperial Japanese Naval Academy in Tokyo from 1874 to 1882. His most important position, however, was as professor of Japanese at Tokyo Imperial University beginning in 1886. It was here that he gained his reputation as a student of Japanese language and literature. (He was also a pioneering scholar of the Ainu and Ryukyuan languages.) His many works include the first translation of the Kojiki into English (1882), A Handbook of Colloquial Japanese (1888), Things Japanese (1890), and A Practical Guide to the Study of Japanese Writing (1905). A keen traveller despite chronic weak health, he cowrote (with W. B. Mason) the 1891 edition of A Handbook for Travellers in Japan, of which revised editions followed.

Chamberlain was a friend of the writer Lafcadio Hearn, once a colleague at the university, but the two became estranged over the years. Percival Lowell dedicated his travelogue Noto: An Unexplored Corner of Japan (1891) to Chamberlain.

Chamberlain sent many Japanese artefacts to the Pitt Rivers Museum at Oxford.

He left Japan in March 1911 and moved to Geneva, where he lived until his death in 1935.

== Selected works by Chamberlain ==
- The Classical Poetry of the Japanese, 1880
- "A Translation of the 'Ko-ji-ki', or Records of Ancient Matters" in Transactions of the Asiatic Society of Japan, Vol. 10, Supplement, 1882
  - Rechaptered with notes by Charles Francis Horne in Horne, ed., The Sacred Books and Early Literature of the East: With an Historical Survey and Descriptions, Vol. 1, 1917, pages 8–61.
  - Wikisource: Kojiki (Horne's edition).
- The Language, Mythology, and Geographical Nomenclature of Japan Viewed in the Light of Aino Studies, 1887
- A Handbook of Colloquial Japanese, 1887
- Aino Folk-Tales, 1888
- Things Japanese, six editions 1890–1936
  - A paperback version of the fifth edition, from 1905, with the short bibliographies appended to many of its articles replaced by lists of other books put out by the new publisher, was issued by the Charles E. Tuttle Company as Japanese Things in 1971 and has since been reprinted several times.
- A Handbook for Travellers in Japan, co-written with W. B. Mason, seven editions 1891–1913 (numbered as third to ninth editions, the first and second editions being of its predecessor, A Handbook for Travellers in Central and Northern Japan by Ernest Satow and A G S Hawes).
- Essay in Aid of a Grammar and Dictionary of the Luchuan Language, 1895 (a pioneering study of the Ryukyuan languages)
- "Bashō and the Japanese Poetical Epigram" in Transactions of the Asiatic Society of Japan, Vol. 2, no. 30, 1902 (some of Chamberlain's translations from this article are included in Faubion Bowers' The Classic Tradition of Haiku: An Anthology, Dover Publications, 1996 ISBN 0-486-29274-6.)
- Japanese Poetry, 1910
- The Invention of a New Religion, 1912 At Project Gutenberg (incorporated into Things Japanese in 1927)
- Huit Siècles de poésie française, 1927
- . . . encore est vive la Souris, 1933

== See also ==
- Anglo-Japanese relations
- O-yatoi gaikokujin
