= Sir Henry Chamberlain, 2nd Baronet =

British Army officer and painter (1796–1843)

Sir Henry Chamberlain Bt
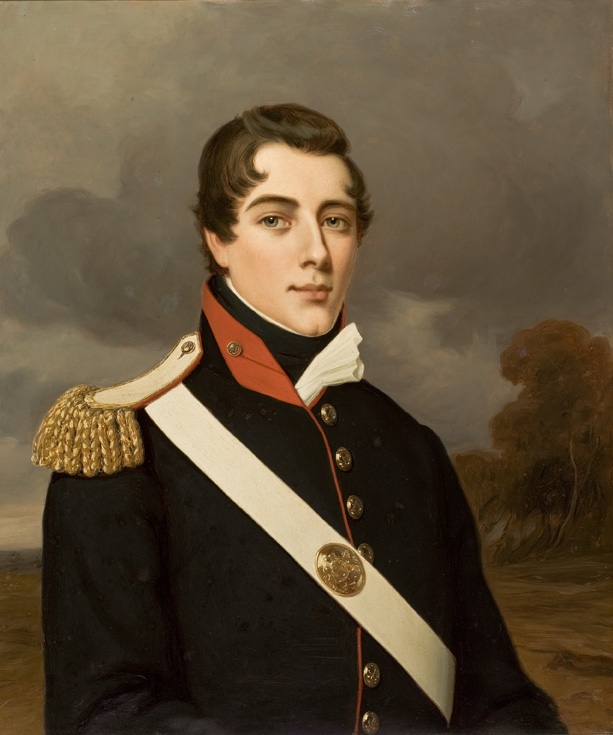
- Sir Henry Chamberlain
- Born: 2 October 1796; London
- Died: 8 September 1843 (aged 46); Bermuda
- Spouse: Harriet Mullen
- Relatives: Sir Henry Chamberlain, 1st Baronet (father)
- Military career
- Allegiance: United Kingdom
- Branch: British Army
- Service years: c. 1815–1843
- Rank: Captain
- Unit: Royal Artillery

Captain Sir Henry Chamberlain, 2nd Baronet (2 October 1796 – 8 September 1843) was a British Army officer of the Royal Artillery and an artist whose series of drawings of Brazil were well known in his time.

He was the second of the Chamberlain baronets, as the eldest son and heir of Sir Henry Chamberlain, 1st Baronet, a British diplomat in Brazil, and his first wife Elizabeth Harrod.

While a lieutenant of the Royal Artillery, he visited his father in Brazil in 1819–20. While there, he painted a series of views and costumes of the city and neighbourhood of Rio de Janeiro, Brazil. The University of Oxford Centre for Brazilian Studies has an album of drawings by him, done during the years 1819 and 1820, with descriptive explanations. His watercolours formed the basis of a famous album of 36 lithographs, each accompanied by a detailed explanation of the particular subject, entitled Views and Costumes of the City and Neighbourhood of Rio de Janeiro. He tried to illustrate the entire range of Rio de Janeiro society, including slaves working on the streets. Art critics have noted a remarkable accuracy in his depictions of cityscapes, which have allowed a reconstruction of the layout of certain places, but the people that populate them appear rather flat. Chamberlain's art has been described as showing the humour typical of 18th-century English artists like William Hogarth.

He reached the rank of captain, and served in New Zealand and Bermuda, where he died in 1843.

Chamberlain married on 11 May 1826, Harriet (died 30 April 1866), daughter of R. Mullen, lieutenant-colonel of the 1st Regiment of Foot. They had issue, including their son and heir Sir Henry Orlando Robert Chamberlain, 3rd Baronet (1828–1870).

Baronetage of the United Kingdom
Preceded by Henry Chamberlain	Baronet (of London); 1829–1843	Succeeded by Henry Orlando Robert Chamberlain
