= William Charles Chamberlain =

Rear admiral in the British Royal Navy (1818–1878)

Rear-Admiral William Charles Chamberlain
- Born: 21 April 1818
- Died: 27 February 1878 (aged 59)
- Spouses: Elizabeth Jane Hall (d. 1856); Sarah Morgan Holroyd
- Relatives: Sir Henry Chamberlain, 1st Baronet (father); Basil Hall Chamberlain (son); Houston Stewart Chamberlain (son)
- Military career
- Allegiance: United Kingdom
- Branch: Royal Navy
- Rank: Lieutenant (1840); Commander (1844); Captain (1856); Rear admiral (1874)
- Commands: Britomart; Cormorant; Conflict; Racoon; Resistance; Asia

Rear-Admiral William Charles Chamberlain (21 April 1818 – 27 February 1878) was a rear admiral in the Royal Navy.

== Family ==
He was the eldest son of the diplomat Sir Henry Chamberlain, 1st Baronet, by his second wife Anne Eugenia née Morgan.

Chamberlain married, firstly, Elizabeth Jane (d. 29 August 1856), daughter of the naval officer, traveller, and author Captain Basil Hall. They had 3 children, Basil Hall Chamberlain (1850–1935), a Japanologist, Henry Chamberlain (1853–1923), a lieutenant-commander in the Royal Navy, and Houston Stewart Chamberlain (1855–1927), the natural historian and author, classified in the Oxford Dictionary of National Biography as a "racialist writer".

Chamberlain married, secondly, Sarah Morgan Holroyd (d. 29 December 1921), daughter of Thomas Holroyd on 29 October 1872. They had a daughter, Harriett Sarah Chamberlain, who died unmarried on 17 March 1939.

== Royal Navy service ==
Chamberlain was promoted to lieutenant in November 1840 and to commander on 22 October 1844. He commanded Britomart on the west coast of Africa in 1847, Cormorant on the south-east coast of America in 1851–2 and Conflict in 1855. He was promoted to captain on 21 February 1856, commanding Racoon and Resistance, both in the Mediterranean, in the early 1860s. He was the commanding officer of Asia, the flagship of the Admiral-Superintendent at Portsmouth, and with this appointment came the role of captain of the Steam Reserve. He was the Superintendent of Chatham Dockyard from 1868 to 1874, and was promoted to the rank of rear admiral on 19 January 1874.

== Death ==
Chamberlain died on 27 February 1878.
