= Wolfgang Schultz =

Austrian philosopher

- Born: 28 June 1881; Vienna, Austria-Hungary
- Died: 24 September 1936 (aged 55); Munich, Germany

Academic background
- Education: University of Vienna

Academic work
- Discipline: Philosophy
- Institutions: Ludwig-Maximilians-Universität München

Wolfgang Schultz (28 June 1881 – 24 September 1936) was an Austrian philosopher who served as Professor and Chair of Philosophy at the Ludwig-Maximilians-Universität München.

== Biography ==
Wolfgang Schultz was born in Vienna, Austria-Hungary, on 28 June 1881. His father was a painter. After gaining his abitur, Schultz studied philosophy and mathematics at the University of Vienna. He also took courses in philology and archaeology. Schultz gained his Ph.D. at Vienna in 1904 with a thesis on Ancient Greece.

During World War I, Schultz fought as a soldier in the Austro-Hungarian Army. From 1914 to 1920, Schultz edited the magazine Mitra. Monatsschrift für vergleichende Mythenforschung, which was dedicated to mythography. From 1918 to 1921 he was the administrator of the "Forschungsinstituts für Osten und Orient". From 1929 to 1931 he published Bernard Bolzano's "Wissenschaftslehre" in four volumes. Schultz joined the Nazi Party in 1932. Upon the forced retirement of Richard Hönigswald, Schultz was in 1934 appointed Professor and Chair of Philosophy at the Ludwig-Maximilians-Universität München. He was in close contact with Amt Rosenberg. Schultz was a publisher of numerous works on archaeology, religion philosophy and ideology. He died in Munich during an operation on 24 September 1936. After World War II, numerous works of Schultz were banned and destroyed in the Soviet occupation zone.

== Selected works ==
- Das Farbempfindungssystem der Hellenen, Leipzig 1904.
- Pythagoras und Heraklit, Leipzig/Wien 1905.
- Altionische Mystik, Leipzig/Wien 1907.
- Dokumente der Gnosis, Jena 1910.
- Die Anschauung vom Monde und seinen Gestalten im Mythos und Kunst der Völker, 1912.
- "Die Sittenlehre des Zarathustra". In: Jahrbuch der Philosophischen Gesellschaft an der Universität Wien, Leipzig 1913, 2–41.
- Zeitrechnung und Weltordnung in ihren übereinstimmenden Grundzügen bei den Indern, Iranern, Hellenen, Italikern, Kelten, Germanen, Litauern, Slawen. (= Mannus-Bibliothek, Band 35.) Leipzig 1924.
- "Tierköpfe mit tierverzierten Feldern in Oseberg und Wendel". In: Mannus, Zeitschrift für deutsche Vorgeschichte, XVII, 1925, S. 344–366.
- "Die Kirche Wang". In: Schlesische Monatshefte, Breslau 1925, S. 233–249.
- "Balder, das Oseberggrab und südrussisch-sakische Parallelen". In: Mannus, V. Ergänzungsband 1927, S. 129–136.
- "Das Schiffsgrab der Wikingerkönigin Asa von Oseberg". In: Die Bergstadt, XV, Breslau 1927, 11 S.
- "Thors Bergung". In: Mannus, VI. Ergänzungsband 1928, S. 316–323.
- "Der Sinn der Leichenverbrennung". In: Altschlesische Blätter, III, Breslau 1928, S. 22–29.
- "Quellen des Volkstanzes I-III". In: Der Volkstanz. III, Leipzig 1928; IV, Leipzig 1929. S. 81, 85, 89–93, 9–15.
- "Die Felsritzung von Hvitlycke und das Eddalied von Thrym". In: Mannus, XXI, 1929, S. 52–71.
- "Die religiöse und geistige Kultur der germanischen Bronzezeit. I: Die Germanen und die Kultur der Felsritzer". In: Jahreshefte der Gesellschaft für Anthropologie und Urgeschichte der preußischen Oberlausitz, III, 2, Görlitz 1929, S. 73–118.
- "Die Naturwissenschaften und unsere Weltanschauung". In: Volk und Rasse, München 1930, 35 S.
- "Die Felsbilder Skandinaviens und Nordafrikas". In: Mitteilungen der Anthropologischen Gesellschaft in Wien, LXI, 1931, S. 239–268.
- "Der Eimer von Sacrau als Religionsdenkmal und Kunstwerk". In: Altschlesische Blätter, VI, Breslau 1931, S. 17–19.
- "Arische Rassenhygiene in der Religion der alten Perser". In: Volk und Rasse, München 1932, S. 129–144.
- "Steuer, Faltboot und Rammspitze im Schiffsbaue der jüngeren Bronzezeit". In: Mannus, XXIV, 1932, S. 40–56.
- "Anthropologie, Urgeschichte, Volkskunde". In: Jahreshefte der Gesellschaft für Anthropologie, Urgeschichte und Volkskunde der preußischen Oberlausitz, III, 3, Görlitz 1933, S. 227–242.
- "Der rassische und völkische Grundgedanke des Nationalsozialismus". In: Die Verwaltungsakademie, Ein Handbuch für den Beamten im nationalsozialistischen Staat, Band 1: Die weltanschaulichen, politischen und staatsrechtlichen Grundlagen des nationalsozialistischen Staates (Gruppe 1, Beitrag 4), Berlin o. J. [1934].
- "Iran und Zarathustra". In: Nationalsozialistische Monatshefte. 5. Jahrgang, Heft 47, München 1934, S. 97–128.
- Altgermanische Kultur in Wort und Bild. Drei Jahrtausende germanischen Kulturgestaltens. Gesamtschau – Die Gipfel – Ausblicke. J. F. Lehmanns Verlag, München 1934, 4. Aufl. 1937.
- Grundgedanken nationalsozialistischer Kulturpolitik, aus dem Nachlass. Franz-Eher-Verlag, München 1939, 2. Aufl. 1943. Wurde nach Ende des Zweiten Weltkrieges in der Sowjetischen Besatzungszone auf die Liste der auszusondernden Literatur gesetzt.

== See also ==
- Georg Hüsing

== Sources ==
- Hubert Reitterer: "Schultz, Wolfgang". In: Österreichisches Biographisches Lexikon 1815–1950 (ÖBL). Vol. 11, Austrian Academy of Sciences, Vienna 1999, ISBN 3-7001-2803-7, p. 352 f. (Direct links to "p. 352", "p. 353")
- Claudia Schorcht: Philosophie an den bayerischen Universitäten 1933 – 1945. Harald Fischer, Erlangen 1990.
- Ernst Klee: Das Kulturlexikon zum Dritten Reich. Wer war was vor und nach 1945. S. Fischer, Frankfurt am Main 2007, ISBN 978-3-10-039326-5.
