= Muttersprache (linguistic society) =

Muttersprache is an Austrian society founded in 1949 for the preservation and development of the German language.
