= Georg Hüsing =

Austrian philologist (1869–1930)

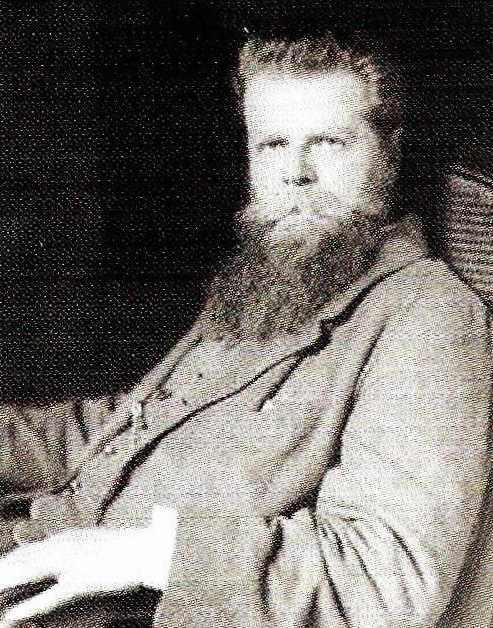
- Born: 4 June 1869; Liegnitz, Kingdom of Prussia
- Died: 1 September 1930 (aged 61); Vienna, Austria

Academic background
- Education: University of Königsberg

Academic work
- Discipline: History; Philology
- Institutions: University of Vienna
- Notable students: Edmund Mudrak
- Main interests: Germanic mythology; Iranian mythology

Georg Hüsing (4 June 1869 – 1 September 1930) was an Austrian historian and philologist who specialized in Germanic studies and mythography.

== Biography ==
Georg Hüsing was born in Liegnitz, Kingdom of Prussia (now Legnica, Poland) on 4 June 1869. He studied ancient history, Indo-European, Semitic, Iranian and German at the universities of Breslau, Berlin and Königsberg. Upon receiving his Ph.D. at Königsberg, Hüsing worked as a private lecturer.

In 1912, Hüsing he joined the University of Vienna, first as a lecturer, and then as a professor, where he taught the history of ancient peoples in the Near East. At Vienna, Hüsing founded what is known as the Vienna School of Mythology. A prominent member of the German nationalist movement in Austria, Hüsing was the founder of the Deutsche Bildung movement. He was a co-founder of the Orientalistischen Literatur-Zeitung and the Mythologischen Bibliothek. With Wolfgang Schultz, Hüsing founded Mitra. Monatsschrift für vergleichende Mythenforschung, which edited until 1920.

== See also ==
- Rudolf Much

== Selected works ==
- (1905) Semitische Lehnwörter im Elamischen. Leipzig: Hinrichs.
- (1906) Beiträge zur Kyros-Sage. Berlin: Preiser.
- (1908) Der Zagros und seine Völker. Eine archäologisch-ethnographische Skizze. Leipzig: Hinrichs.
- (1909). Die iranische Überlieferung und das arische System. Leipzig: Hinrichs.
- (1911). Krsaaspa im Schlangenleibe und andere Nachträge zur Iranischen Überlieferung. Leipzig: Hinrichs.
- (1916) Völkerschichten in Iran. Wien: Hölder.
- (1927) Die deutschen Hochgezeiten. Wien: Eichendorff-Haus.
- (1928) Germanische Gottheiten. Wien: Eichendorff-Haus.
- (1932) mit Emma Hüsing. Deutsche Laiche und Lieder. Wien: Eichendorff-Haus.
- (1934) mit Edmund Mudrak. Die vierte Märge. Wien: Gesellschaft Deutsche Bildung.
- (1937) mit Heinrich Lessmann. Der deutsche Volksmund im Lichte der Sage. Berlin: Stubenrauch.

== Sources ==
- Olaf Bockhorn: Von Ritualen, Mythen und Lebenskreisen. Volkskunde im Umfeld der Universität Wien. In: Wolfgang Jacobeit, Hannjost Lixfeld (Hg.). Völkische Wissenschaft. Gestalten und Tendenzen der deutschen und österreichischen Volkskunde in der ersten Hälfte des 20. Jahrhunderts. Böhlau, Wien 1994, ISBN 3-205-98208-8, S. 477–526.
- Olaf Bockhorn: „Die Angelegenheit Dr. Wolfram, Wien“. Zur Besetzung der Professur für germanisch-deutsche Volkskunde an der Universität Wien. In: Mitchell Ash, Wolfram Niess, Ramon Pils (Hg.): Geisteswissenschaften im Nationalsozialismus. Das Beispiel der Universität Wien. Vandenhoeck & Ruprecht unipress, Göttingen 2010, ISBN 978-3-89971-568-2, S. 199–224.
- Elfriede Moser-Rath: Hüsing, Georg. In: Rolf Wilhelm Brednich (Hg.): Enzyklopädie des Märchens. Band 6: Gott und Teufel auf Wanderschaft – Hyltén-Cavallius. De Gruyter, Berlin 1990, ISBN 3-11-011763-0, Sp. 1411–1412.
- Falco Pfalzgraf: Karl Tekusch als Sprachpfleger. Seine Rolle in Wiener Sprachvereinen des 20. Jahrhunderts (= Greifswalder Beiträge zur Linguistik, Bd. 10). Hempen, Bremen 2016.
- Peter Rohrbacher: Encrypted Astronomy, Astral Mythologies, and Ancient Mexican Studies in Austria, 1910–1945. In: Revista de Antropologia. Universidade de São Paulo, Jg. 62 (2019), Sonderheft German and German-speaking Anthropologists in Brazil, S. 140–161 (online).
- Leopold Schmidt: Geschichte der österreichischen Volkskunde. Österreichischer Bundesverlag, Wien 1951.
