= Leopold von Schroeder =

German Indologist (1851–1920)

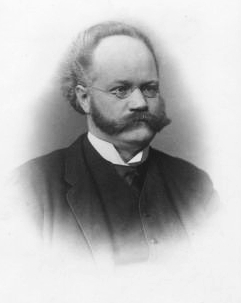
- Born: 24 December 1851; Tartu, Russian Empire (now Estonia)
- Died: 8 February 1920 (aged 68)

Leopold von Schroeder (December 24, 1851, Tartu – February 8, 1920, Vienna) was an Indologist from the Russian Empire, who later worked in Austria-Hungary.

He studied at the universities of Dorpat, Jena and Tübingen. Having worked as lecturer in Indology at Dorpat since 1882, then as an assistant professor since 1890, he became a professor at Innsbruck in 1896, and, eventually, at the University of Vienna from 1899 onward. Among his notable achievements is the translation of the Bhagavadgita from Sanskrit to German. He was also engaged in scientific studies of legends and myths.

== Works ==
- Pythagoras und die Inder ("Pythagoras and the Indians") 1884.
- Buddhismus und Christenthum: Zwei öffentliche Vorträge ("Buddhism and Christianity; two public lectures") 1893.
- Mysterium und mimus im Rigveda ("Mystery and mimus in Rigveda") 1908.
- Die Wurzeln der Sage vom heiligen Gral ("The roots of the legend of the Holy Grail") Bohmeier Verlag ISBN 978-3-89094-444-9
- Die Vollendung des Arischen Mysteriums in Bayreuth ("Fulfilment of the Aryan Mystery at Bayreuth"), 1911.
- Bhagavad-gita, des Erhabenen Sang ("Bhagavad-gita, the sublime song"), 1912.
- Arische Religion ("Aryan religion") 1914.
- Bhagavadgita, Diederichs, 1952.
- Bhagavadgita - Aschtavakragita - Indiens heilige Gesänge, Leopold von Schroeder and Heinrich Zimmer, Diederichs Gelbe Reihe, 2004, ISBN 3-89631-440-8

== Sources ==
- "Шрёдер, Леопольд" . Brockhaus and Efron Encyclopedic Dictionary (in Russian). 1906.
