= Arthur de Gobineau =

French diplomat and writer (1816–1882)

- Portrait of Count Arthur Joseph de Gobineau, c. 1860s
- Born: Joseph Arthur de Gobineau; 14 July 1816; Ville-d'Avray, Hauts-de-Seine, France
- Died: 13 October 1882 (aged 66); Turin, Italy
- Occupations: Novelist, diplomat, travel writer
- Spouse: Clémence Gabrielle Monnerot
- Children: Christine de Gobineau; Diane de Guldencrone

Arthur de Gobineau, Count de Gobineau (French: [ɡɔbino]; Joseph Arthur de Gobineau; 14 July 1816 – 13 October 1882) was a French writer and diplomat who is best known for helping introduce scientific race theory and "racial demography", and for developing the theory of the Aryan master race and Nordicism. He was an elitist who, in the immediate aftermath of the Revolutions of 1848, wrote An Essay on the Inequality of the Human Races. In it he argued that aristocrats were superior to commoners and that aristocrats possessed more Aryan genetic traits because of less interbreeding with inferior races.

Gobineau was born to an aristocratic family of counts under the Ancien Régime. He was ideologically a Legitimist who supported royalist rule by the House of Bourbon and opposed the French Revolution, democracy, and rule by the House of Orléans which came to power after the 1830 July Revolution. He began his diplomatic career in the late 1840s, and beginning in 1861, variously served as minister to Persia, Brazil, Greece, and Sweden. As a writer, Gobineau authored novels and short stories, as well as non-fiction travel writings, polemical essays and other philological and anthropological works, including his Essai. His Essai is widely discredited as pseudoscience by modern scholarship. Gobineau himself never had any qualifications in anthropology.

Although Gobineau's writings were poorly received in France, they were quickly praised by white supremacist, pro-slavery Americans like Josiah C. Nott and Henry Hotze, who translated his book into English. They omitted around 1,000 pages of the original book, including those parts that negatively described Americans as a racially mixed population. Inspiring a social movement in Germany named Gobinism, his works were also influential on prominent antisemites like Richard Wagner, Wagner's son-in-law Houston Stewart Chamberlain, the Romanian politician Professor A. C. Cuza, and leaders of the Nazi Party, who later edited and re-published his work.

== Early life and writings ==
=== Origins ===
Gobineau came from an old well-established aristocratic family. His father, Louis de Gobineau (1784–1858), was a military officer and staunch royalist. His mother, Anne-Louise Magdeleine de Gercy, was the daughter of a non-noble royal tax official. The de Gercy family lived in the French Crown colony of Saint-Domingue (modern Haiti) for a time in the 18th century.

Reflecting his hatred of the French Revolution, Gobineau later wrote: "My birthday is July 14th, the date on which the Bastille was captured-which goes to prove how opposites may come together". As a boy and young man, Gobineau loved the Middle Ages, which he saw as a golden age of chivalry and knighthood much preferable to his own time. Someone who knew Gobineau as a teenager described him as a romantic, "with chivalrous ideas and a heroic spirit, dreaming of what was most noble and most grand".

Gobineau's father was committed to restoring the House of Bourbon and helped the royalist Polignac brothers to escape from France. As punishment he was imprisoned by Napoleon's secret police but was freed when the Allies took Paris in 1814. During the Hundred Days the de Gobineau family fled France. After Napoleon's final overthrow following the Battle of Waterloo, Louis de Gobineau was rewarded for his loyalty to the House of Bourbon by being made a captain in the Royal Guard of King Louis XVIII. The pay for a Royal Guardsman was very low, and the de Gobineau family struggled on his salary.

Magdeleine de Gobineau abandoned her husband for her children's tutor Charles de La Coindière. Together with her lover she took her son and two daughters on extended wanderings across eastern France, Switzerland and the Grand Duchy of Baden. To support herself, she turned to fraud (for which she was imprisoned). His mother became a severe embarrassment to Gobineau, who never spoke to her after he turned twenty.

For the young de Gobineau, committed to upholding traditional aristocratic and Catholic values, the disintegration of his parents' marriage, his mother's open relationship with her lover, her fraudulent acts, and the turmoil imposed by being constantly on the run and living in poverty were all very traumatic.

=== Adolescence ===
Gobineau spent the early part of his teenage years in the town of Inzligen where his mother and her lover were staying. He became fluent in German. As a staunch supporter of the House of Bourbon, his father was forced to retire from the Royal Guard after the July Revolution of 1830 brought House of Orléans King Louis-Philippe, Le roi citoyen, ("the Citizen King") to power. He promised to reconcile the heritage of the French Revolution with the monarchy. Given his family's history of supporting the Bourbons, the young Gobineau regarded the July Revolution as a disaster for France. His views were those of a Legitimist committed to a Catholic France ruled over by the House of Bourbon. In 1831, de Gobineau's father took custody of his three children, and his son spent the rest of his adolescence in Lorient, in Brittany.

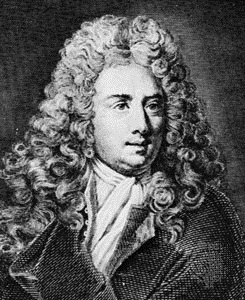
The Orientalist tales of Antoine Galland (pictured) had a strong influence on Gobineau in his youth.

Gobineau disliked his father, whom he dismissed as a boring and pedantic army officer incapable of stimulating thought. Lorient had been founded in 1675 as a base for the French East India Company as King Louis XIV had grand ambitions for making France the dominant political and economic power in Asia. As those ambitions were unrealized, Gobineau developed a sense of faded glory as he grew up in a city that had been built to be the dominant hub for Europe's trade with Asia. This dream went unrealized, as India became part of the British and not the French empire.

As a young man, Gobineau was fascinated with the Orient, as the Middle East was known in Europe in the 19th century. While studying at the Collège de Bironne in Switzerland, a fellow student recalled: "All of his aspirations were towards the East. He dreamt only of mosques and minarets; he called himself a Muslim, ready to make the pilgrimage to Mecca". Gobineau loved Oriental tales by the French translator Antoine Galland, often saying he wanted to become an Orientalist. He read Arab, Turkish and Persian tales in translation, becoming what the French call a "un orientaliste de pacotille" ("rubbish orientalist"). In 1835, Gobineau failed the entrance exams to the St. Cyr military school.

In September 1835, Gobineau left for Paris with fifty francs in his pocket aiming to become a writer. He moved in with an uncle, Thibaut-Joseph de Gobineau, a Legitimist with an "unlimited" hatred of Louis-Philippe. Reflecting his tendency towards elitism, Gobineau founded a society of Legitimist intellectuals called Les Scelti ("the elect"), which included himself, the painter Guermann John (German von Bohn) and the writer Maxime du Camp.

=== Early writings ===
In the later years of the July Monarchy, Gobineau made his living writing serialized fiction (romans-feuilletons) and contributing to reactionary periodicals. He wrote for the Union Catholique, La Quotidienne, L'Unité, and Revue de Paris. At one point in the early 1840s, Gobineau was writing an article every day for La Quotidienne to support himself. As a writer and journalist, he struggled financially and was forever looking for a wealthy patron willing to support him. As a part-time employee of the Post Office and a full-time writer, Gobineau was desperately poor.

His family background made him a supporter of the House of Bourbon, but the nature of the Legitimist movement dominated by factious and inept leaders drove Gobineau to despair, leading him to write: "We are lost and had better resign ourselves to the fact". In a letter to his father, Gobineau complained of "the laxity, the weakness, the foolishness and—in a word—the pure folly of my cherished party".

At the same time, he regarded French society under the House of Orléans as corrupt and self-serving, dominated by the "oppressive feudalism of money" as opposed to the feudalism of "charity, courage, virtue and intelligence" held by the ancien-régime nobility. Gobineau wrote about July Monarchy France: "Money has become the principle of power and honour. Money dominates business; money regulates the population; money governs; money salves consciences; money is the criterion for judging the esteem due to men".

In this "age of national mediocrity" as Gobineau described it, with society going in a direction he disapproved of, the leaders of the cause to which he was committed being by his own admission foolish and incompetent, and the would-be aristocrat struggling to make ends meet by writing hack journalism and novels, he became more and more pessimistic about the future. Gobineau wrote in a letter to his father: "How I despair of a society which is no longer anything, except in spirit, and which has no heart left". He complained the Legitimists spent their time feuding with one another while the Catholic Church "is going over to the side of the revolution". Gobineau wrote:

Our poor country lies in Roman decadence. Where there is no longer an aristocracy worthy of itself, a nation dies. Our Nobles are conceited fools and cowards. I no longer believe in anything nor have any views. From Louis-Philippe we shall proceed to the first trimmer who will take us up, but only in order to pass us on to another. For we are without fibre and moral energy. Money has killed everything.

Gobineau struck up a friendship and had voluminous correspondence with Alexis de Tocqueville. Tocqueville praised Gobineau in a letter: "You have wide knowledge, much intelligence, and the best of manners". He later gave Gobineau an appointment in the Quai d'Orsay (the French foreign ministry) while serving as foreign minister during the Second Republic of France.

==== Breakthrough with Kapodistrias article ====
In 1841, Gobineau scored his first major success when an article he submitted to Revue des deux Mondes was published on 15 April 1841. Gobineau's article was about the Greek statesman Count Ioannis Kapodistrias. At the time, La Revue des Deux Mondes was one of the most prestigious journals in Paris, and being published in it put Gobineau in the same company as George Sand, Théophile Gautier, Philarète Chasles, Alphonse de Lamartine, Edgar Quinet and Charles Augustin Sainte-Beuve who were all published regularly in that journal.

=== On international politics ===
Gobineau's writings on international politics were generally as negative as his writings on France. He depicted Britain as a nation motivated entirely by hatred and greed and the extent of the British Empire around the globe as a source of regret. Gobineau often attacked King Louis-Phillipe for his pro-British foreign policy, writing that he had "humiliated" France by allowing the British Empire to become the world's dominant power. However, reports on the poor economic state of Ireland were a source of satisfaction for Gobineau as he asserted: "It is Ireland which is pushing England into the abyss of revolution".

According to Gobineau, the growing power and aggressiveness of Imperial Russia were a cause for concern. He regarded the disastrous retreat from Kabul by the British during the First Anglo-Afghan War with Afghanistan as a sign Russia would be the dominant power in Asia, writing: "England, an aging nation, is defending its livelihood and its existence. Russia, a youthful nation, is following its path towards the power that it must surely gain ... The empire of the Tsars is today the power which seems to have the greatest future ... The Russian people are marching steadfastly towards a goal that is indeed known but still not completely defined". Gobineau regarded Russia as an Asian power and felt the inevitable triumph of Russia was a triumph of Asia over Europe.

He had mixed feelings about the German states, praising Prussia as a conservative society dominated by the Junkers. But he worried increasing economic growth promoted by the Zollverein (the German Customs Union) was making the Prussian middle-class more powerful. Gobineau was critical of the Austrian Empire, writing that the House of Habsburg ruled over a mixed population of ethnic Germans, Magyars, Italians, Slavic peoples, etc., and it was inevitable such a multi-ethnic society would go into decline, while the "purely German" Prussia was destined to unify Germany.

Gobineau was also pessimistic about Italy, writing: "Shortly after the condottieri disappeared everything that had lived and flourished with them went too; wealth, gallantry, art and liberty, there remained nothing but a fertile land and an incomparable sky". Gobineau denounced Spain for rejecting "a firm and natural authority, a power rooted in national liberty", predicting that without order imposed by an absolute monarchy, she was destined to sink into a state of perpetual revolution. He was dismissive of Latin America, writing with references to the wars of independence: "The destruction of their agriculture, trade and finances, the inevitable consequence of long civil disorder, did not at all seem to them a price too high to pay for what they had in view. And yet who would want to claim that the half-barbarous inhabitants of Castile or the Algarve or the gauchos on the River Plate really deserve to sit as supreme legislators, in the places which they have contested against their masters with such pleasure and energy".

About the United States, Gobineau wrote: "The only greatness is that of wealth, and as everyone can acquire this, its ownership is independent of any of the qualities reserved to superior natures". Gobineau wrote the United States lacked an aristocracy, with no sense of noblesse oblige ("nobility obligates") as existed in Europe. The American poor suffered worse than the European poor, causing the United States to be a violent society, where greed and materialism were the only values that counted. In general Gobineau was hostile towards people in the Americas, writing that who in the Old World does not know "that the New World knows nothing of kings, princes and nobles?-that on those semi-virgin lands, in human societies born yesterday and scarcely yet consolidated, no one has the right or the power to call himself any greater than the very least of its citizens?".

=== Marriage ===
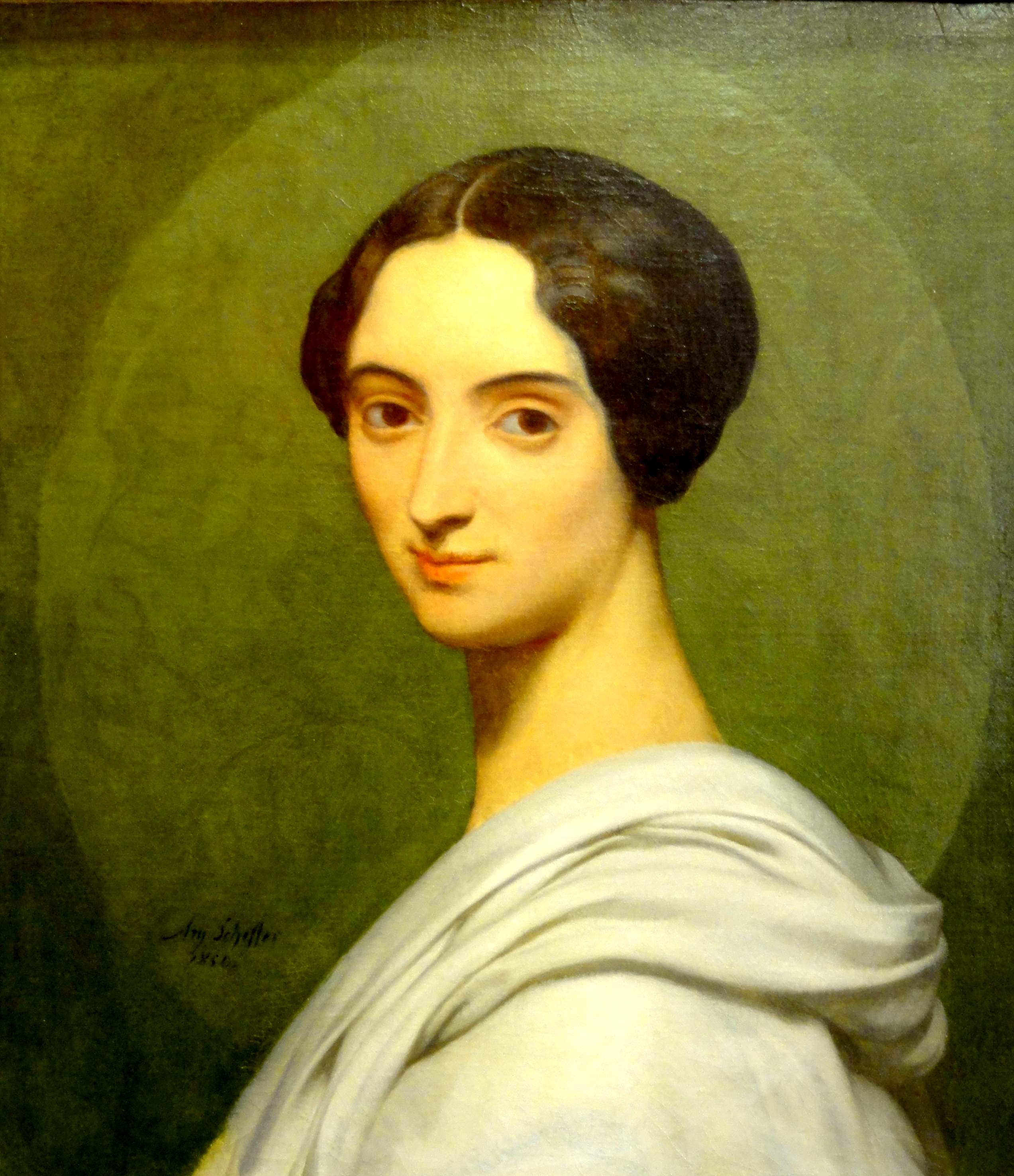
Portrait of Gobineau's wife, Clémence, by Ary Scheffer (1850)

In 1846, Gobineau married Clémence Gabrielle Monnerot. She had pressed for a hasty marriage as she was pregnant by their mutual friend Pierre de Serre who had abandoned her. As a practicing Catholic, she did not wish to give birth to an illegitimate child. Monnerot had been born in Martinique. As with his mother, Gobineau was never entirely certain if his wife, and hence his two daughters had black ancestors or not, as it was a common practice for French slave masters in the Caribbean to take a slave mistress. Gobineau's opposition to slavery, which he held always resulted in harmful miscegenation to whites, may have stemmed from his own personal anxieties that his mother or his wife might have African ancestry.

== Early diplomatic work and theories on race ==
=== Embittered royalist ===
Gobineau's novels and poems of the 1830s–40s were usually set in the Middle Ages or the Renaissance with aristocratic heroes who by their very existence uphold all of the values Gobineau felt were worth celebrating like honor and creativity against a corrupt, soulless middle class. His 1847 novel Ternove was the first time Gobineau linked class with race, writing "Monsieur de Marvejols would think of himself, and of all members of the nobility, as of a race apart, of a superior essence, and he believed it criminal to sully this by mixture with plebeian blood." The novel, set against the backdrop of the Hundred Days of 1815, concerns the disastrous results when an aristocrat Octave de Ternove unwisely marries the daughter of a miller.

Gobineau was horrified by the Revolution of 1848 and disgusted by what he saw as the supine reaction of the European upper classes to the revolutionary challenge. Writing in the spring of 1848 about the news from Germany he noted: "Things are going pretty badly ... I do not mean the dismissal of the princes—that was deserved. Their cowardice and lack of political faith make them scarcely interesting. But the peasants, there they are nearly barbarous. There is pillage, and burning, and massacre—and we are only at the beginning."

As a Legitimist, Gobineau disliked the House of Bonaparte and was displeased when Louis-Napoleon Bonaparte was elected president of the republic in 1848. However, he came to support Bonaparte as the best man to preserve order, and in 1849, when Tocqueville became Foreign Minister, his friend Gobineau became his chef de cabinet.

=== Racial theories and aristocrats ===
Shocked by the Revolution of 1848, Gobineau first expressed his racial theories in his 1848 epic poem Manfredine. In it he revealed his fear of the revolution being the beginning of the end of aristocratic Europe, with common folk descended from lesser breeds taking over. Reflecting his disdain for ordinary people, Gobineau said French aristocrats like himself were the descendants of the Germanic Franks who conquered the Roman province of Gaul in the fifth century AD, while common French people were the descendants of racially inferior Celtic and Mediterranean people. This was an old theory first promoted in a tract by Count Henri de Boulainvilliers. He had argued that the Second Estate (the aristocracy) was of "Frankish" blood and the Third Estate (the commoners) were of "Gaulish" blood. Born after the French Revolution had destroyed the idealized Ancien Régime of his imagination, Gobineau felt a deep sense of pessimism regarding the future.

For him the French Revolution, having destroyed the racial basis of French greatness by overthrowing and in many cases killing the aristocracy, was the beginning of a long, irresistible process of decline and degeneration, which could only end with the utter collapse of European civilization. He felt what the French Revolution had begun the Industrial Revolution was finishing; industrialization and urbanization were a complete disaster for Europe.

Like many other European romantic conservatives, Gobineau looked back nostalgically at an idealized version of the Middle Ages as an idyllic agrarian society living harmoniously in a rigid social order. He loathed modern Paris, a city he called a "giant cesspool" full of les déracinés ("the uprooted")—the criminal, impoverished, drifting men with no real home. Gobineau considered them to be the monstrous products of centuries of miscegenation ready to explode in revolutionary violence at any moment. He was an ardent opponent of democracy, which he stated was mere "mobocracy"—a system that allowed the utterly stupid mob the final say on running the state.

=== Time in Switzerland and Germany ===
From November 1849 to January 1854 Gobineau was stationed at the French legation in Bern as the First Secretary. During his time in Switzerland Gobineau wrote the majority of the Essai.

He was stationed in Hanover in the Autumn of 1851 as acting Chargé d'Affaires, and was impressed by the "traces of real nobility" he said he saw at the Hanoverian court. Gobineau especially liked the blind King George V whom he saw as a "philosopher-king" and to whom he dedicated the Essais. He praised the "remarkable character" of Hanoverian men and likewise commended Hanoverian society as having "an instinctive preference for hierarchy" with the commoners always deferring to the nobility, which he explained on racial grounds.

Reflecting his lifelong interest in the Orient, Gobineau joined the Société Asiatique in 1852 and got to know several Orientalists, like Julius von Mohl, very well.

In January 1854, Gobineau was sent as First Secretary to the French legation at the Free City of Frankfurt. Of the Federal Convention of the German Confederation that sat in Frankfurt—also known as the "Confederation Diet"—Gobineau wrote: "The Diet is a business office for the German bureaucracy—it is very far from being a real political body". Gobineau hated the Prussian representative at the Diet, Prince Otto von Bismarck, because of his advances towards Madame Gobineau. By contrast, the Austrian representative, General Anton von Prokesch-Osten became one of Gobineau's best friends. He was a reactionary Austrian soldier and diplomat who hated democracy and saw himself as a historian and orientalist, and for all these reasons Gobineau bonded with him. It was during these periods that Gobineau began to write less often to his old liberal friend Tocqueville and more often to his new conservative friend Prokesch-Osten.

=== Gobineau's racial theories ===
In his own lifetime, Gobineau was known as a novelist, a poet and for his travel writing recounting his adventures in Iran and Brazil rather than for the racial theories for which he is now mostly remembered. However, he always regarded his book Essai sur l'inégalité des races humaines (An Essay on the Inequality of the Human Races) as his masterpiece and wanted to be remembered as its author. A firm reactionary who believed in the innate superiority of aristocrats over commoners—whom he held in utter contempt—Gobineau embraced the now-discredited doctrine of scientific racism to justify aristocratic rule over racially inferior commoners.

== An Essay on the Inequality of the Human Races ==
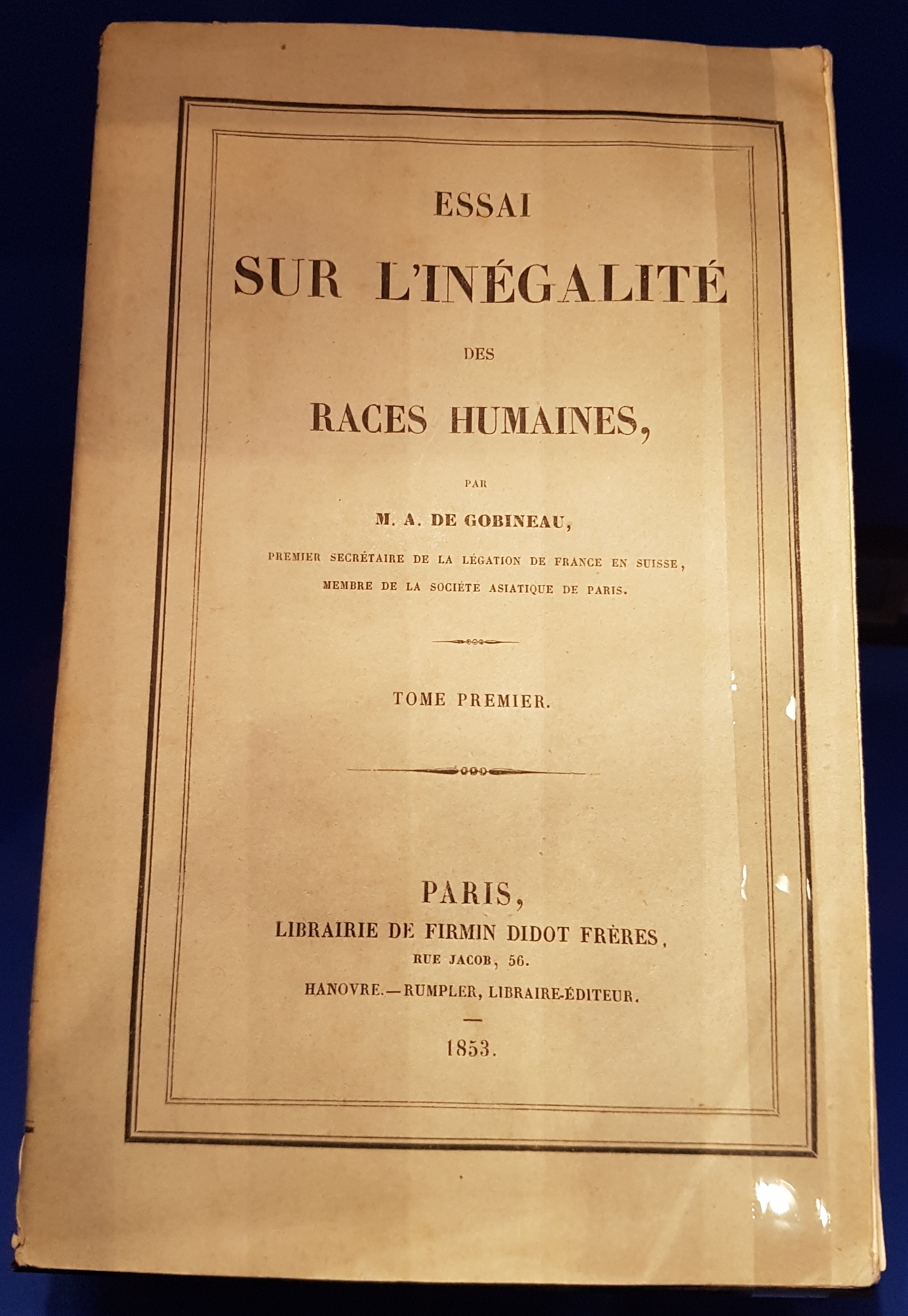
Cover of the original edition of An Essay on the Inequality of the Human Races

In his An Essay on the Inequality of the Human Races, published in 1855, Gobineau seemingly accepts the prevailing Christian doctrine that all human beings shared the common ancestors Adam and Eve (monogenism as opposed to polygenism). Statements like "nothing proves that at the first redaction of the Adamite genealogies the colored races were considered as forming part of the species"; and, "We may conclude that the power of producing fertile offspring is among the marks of a distinct species. As nothing leads us to believe that the human race is outside this rule, there is no answer to this argument" can be read as intentionally misleading discourse, inserted into the essay in anticipation of contemporary religious critiques.

Gobineau sketched several different races, attributing each with a different level of civility. Unsurprisingly, he placed the 'European' in the most developed stage (or l'état lumineux). In a historical context were the dominant idea was that 'civility' was developed over time, the different stages of development could imply a separate creation of races, the most developed created first, and the least developed created last (polygenesis). A different interpretation could be that all races were created together, but that the 'non-European' races simply stopped developing (monogenesis). Furthermore, Gobineau clarified that he wrote about races, not individuals: examples of talented black or Asian individuals did not disprove his thesis of the supposed inferiority of the black and Asian races. He wrote:

"I will not wait for the friends of equality to show me such and such passages in books written by missionaries or sea captains, who declare some Wolof is a fine carpenter, some Hottentot a good servant, that a Kaffir dances and plays the violin, that some Bambara knows arithmetic … Let us leave aside these puerilities and compare together not men, but groups."

Gobineau argued that race was destiny, declaring rhetorically:

So the brain of a Huron Indian contains in undeveloped form an intellect which is absolutely that same as an Englishman or a Frenchman! Why then, in the course of the ages has he not then invented printing or steam power?

Gobineau's primary thesis was that European civilization flowed from Greece to Rome, and then to Germanic and contemporary civilization. He thought this corresponded to the ancient Indo-European culture, or "Aryan"—a common term at the time used to denote prehistorical Indo-Iranians praised as the ancestors of the 'most developed', 'European race'. This included groups classified by language like the Celts, Slavs and the Germans. Gobineau later came to use and reserve the term Aryan only for the "Germanic race", and described the Aryans as la race germanique. By doing so, he presented a racist theory in which Aryans—that is Germanic people—were all that was positive.

=== Reaction to Gobineau's essay ===
The Essai attracted mostly negative reviews from French critics, which Gobineau used as a proof of the supposed truth of his racial theories, writing "the French, who are always ready to set anything afire—materially speaking—and who respect nothing, either in religion or politics, have always been the world's greatest cowards in matters of science". However, events such as the expansion of European and American influence overseas and the unification of Germany led Gobineau to alter his opinion to believe the "white race" could be saved. The German-born American historian George Mosse argued that Gobineau projected his fear and hatred of the French middle and working classes onto Asian and Black people.

Summarizing Mosse's argument, Davies argued that: "The self-serving, materialistic oriental of the Essai was really an anti-capitalist's portrait of the money-grubbing French middle class" while "the sensual, unintelligent and violent negro" that Gobineau portrayed in the Essai was an aristocratic caricature of the French poor. In his writings on the French peasantry, Gobineau characteristically insisted in numerous anecdotes, which he said were based on personal experience, that French farmers were coarse, crude people incapable of learning, indeed of any sort of thinking beyond the most rudimentary level of thought. As the American critic Michelle Wright wrote, "the peasant may inhabit the land, but they are certainly not part of it". Wright further noted the very marked similarity between Gobineau's picture of the French peasantry and his view of blacks.

=== Time in Persia ===
In 1855, Gobineau left Paris to become the first secretary at the French legation in Tehran, Persia (modern Iran). He was promoted to chargé d'affaires the following year. The histories of Persia and Greece had played prominent roles in the Essai and Gobineau wanted to see both places for himself. His mission was to keep Persia out of the Russian sphere of influence, but he cynically wrote: "If the Persians ... unite with the western powers, they will march against the Russians in the morning, be defeated by them at noon and become their allies by evening". Gobineau's time was not taxed by his diplomatic duties, and he spent time studying ancient cuneiform texts and learning Persian. He came to speak a "kitchen Persian" that allowed him to talk to Persians somewhat. (He was never fluent in Persian as he said he was.) Despite having some love for the Persians, Gobineau was shocked they lacked his racial prejudices and were willing to accept blacks as equals. He criticized Persian society for being too "democratic".

Gobineau saw Persia as a land without a future destined to be conquered by the West sooner or later. For him this was a tragedy for the West. He believed Western men would all too easily be seduced by the beautiful Persian women causing more miscegenation to further "corrupt" the West. However, he was obsessed with ancient Persia, seeing in Achaemenid Persia a great and glorious Aryan civilization, now sadly gone. This was to preoccupy him for the rest of his life. Gobineau loved to visit the ruins of the Achaemenid period as his mind was fundamentally backward looking, preferring to contemplate past glories rather than what he saw as a dismal present and even bleaker future.

His time in Persia inspired two books: Mémoire sur l'état social de la Perse actuelle (1858) ("Memoire on the Social State of Today's Persia") and Trois ans en Asie (1859) ("Three Years in Asia").

Gobineau was less than complimentary about modern Persia. He wrote to Prokesch-Osten that there was no "Persian race" as modern Persians were "a breed mixed from God knows what!". He loved ancient Persia as the great Aryan civilization par excellence, however, noting that Iran means "the land of the Aryans" in Persian. Gobineau was less Eurocentric than one might expect in his writings on Persia, believing the origins of European civilization could be traced to Persia. He criticized western scholars for their "collective vanity" in being unable to admit to the West's "huge" debt to Persia.

=== Josiah C. Nott and Henry Hotze ===
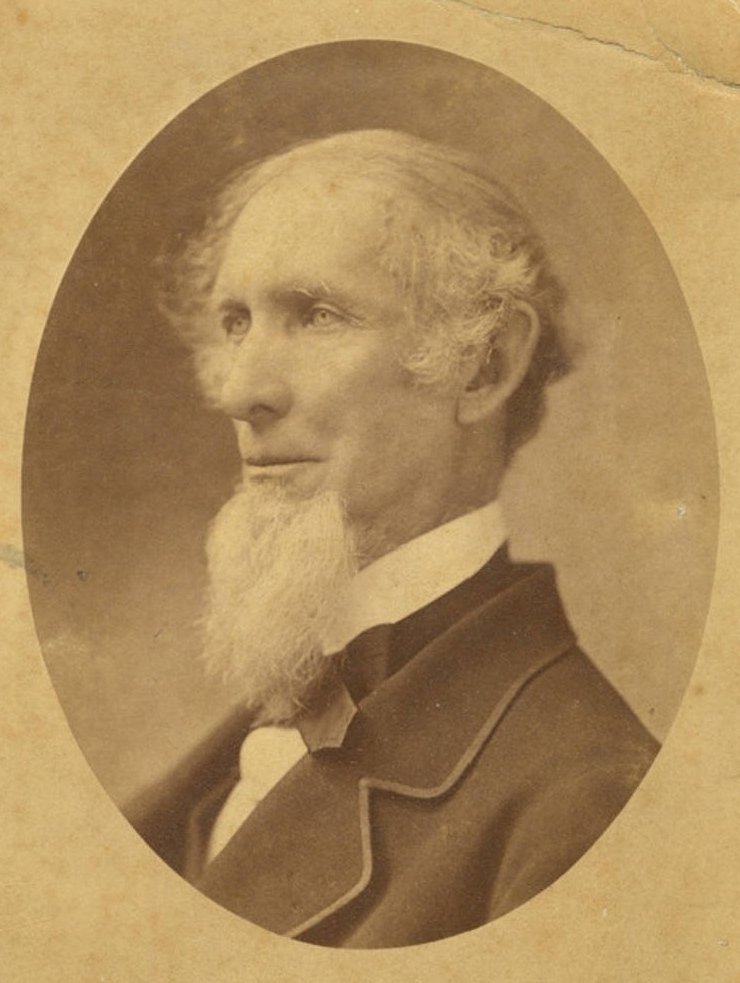
Josiah C. Nott

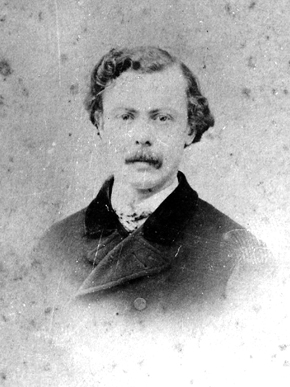
Henry Hotze

In 1856, two American "race scientists", Josiah C. Nott and Henry Hotze, both ardent white supremacists, translated Essai sur l'inégalité des races humaines into English. Champions of slavery, they found in Gobineau's anti-black writings a convenient justification for the "peculiar institution". Nott and Hotze found much to approve of in the Essai such as: "The Negro is the most humble and lags at the bottom of the scale. The animal character imprinted upon his brow marks his destiny from the moment of his conception". Much to Gobineau's intense annoyance, Nott and Hotze abridged the first volume of the Essai from 1,600 pages in the French original down to 400 in English. At least part of the reason for this was because of Gobineau's hostile picture of Americans. About American white people, Gobineau declared:

They are a very mixed assortment of the most degenerate races in olden-day Europe. They are the human flotsam of all ages: Irish, crossbreed Germans and French and Italians of even more doubtful stock. The intermixture of all these decadent ethnic varieties will inevitably give birth to further ethnic chaos. This chaos is no way unexpected or new: it will produce no further ethnic mixture which has not already been, or cannot be realized on our own continent. Absolutely nothing productive will result from it, and even when ethnic combinations resulting from infinite unions between Germans, Irish, Italians, French and Anglo-Saxons join us in the south with racial elements composed of Indian, Negro, Spanish and Portuguese essence, it is quite unimaginable that anything could result from such horrible confusions, but an incoherent juxtaposition of the most decadent kinds of people.

Highly critical passages like this were removed from The Moral and Intellectual Diversity of Races, as the Essai was titled in English. Nott and Hotze retained only the parts relating to the alleged inherent inferiority of blacks. Likewise, they used Gobineau as a way of attempting to establish that white America was in mortal peril despite the fact that most American blacks were slaves in 1856. The two "race scientists" argued on the basis of the Essai that blacks were essentially a type of vicious animal, rather than human beings, and would always pose a danger to whites. The passages of the Essai where Gobineau declared that, though of low intelligence, blacks had certain artistic talents and that a few "exceptional" African tribal chiefs probably had a higher IQ than those of the stupidest whites were not included in the American edition. Nott and Hotze wanted nothing that might give blacks admirable human qualities. Beyond that, they argued that nation and race were the same, and that to be American was to be white. As such, the American translators argued in their introduction that just as various European nations were torn apart by nationality conflicts caused by different "races" living together, likewise ending slavery and granting American citizenship to blacks would cause the same sort of conflicts, but only on a much vaster scale in the United States.

=== Time in Newfoundland ===
In 1859, an Anglo-French dispute over the French fishing rights on the French Shore of Newfoundland led to an Anglo-French commission being sent to Newfoundland to find a resolution to the dispute. Gobineau was one of the two French commissioners dispatched to Newfoundland, an experience that he later recorded in his 1861 book Voyage à Terre-Neuve ("Voyage to Newfoundland"). In 1858, the Foreign Minister Count Alexandre Colonna-Walewski had tried to send Gobineau to the French legation in Beijing. He objected that as a "civilized European" he had no wish to go to an Asian country like China. As punishment, Walewski sent Gobineau to Newfoundland, telling him he would be fired from the Quai d'Orsay if he refused the Newfoundland assignment.

Gobineau hated Newfoundland, writing to a friend in Paris on 26 July 1859: "This is an awful country. It is very cold, there is almost constant fog, and one sails between pieces of floating ice of enormous size." In his time in St. John's, a city largely inhabited by Irish immigrants, Gobineau deployed virtually every anti-Irish cliché in his reports to Paris. He stated the Irish of St. John's were extremely poor, undisciplined, conniving, obstreperous, dishonest, loud, violent, and usually drunk. He described several of the remote fishing settlements he visited in Utopian terms, praising them as examples of how a few hardy, tough people could make a living under very inhospitable conditions. Gobineau's praise for Newfoundland fishermen reflected his viewpoint that those who cut themselves off from society best preserve their racial purity. Despite his normal contempt for ordinary people, he called the Newfoundland fishermen he met "the best men that I have ever seen in the world". Gobineau observed that in these remote coastal settlements, there were no policemen as there was no crime, going on to write:

I am not sorry to have seen once in my life a sort of Utopia. [...] A savage and hateful climate, a forbidding countryside, the choice between poverty and hard dangerous labour, no amusements, no pleasures, no money, fortune and ambition being equally impossible—and still, for all this, a cheerful outlook, a kind of domestic well-being of the most primitive kind. [...] But this is what succeeds in enabling men to make use of complete liberty and to be tolerant of one another.

== Ministerial career ==
=== Minister to Persia ===
In 1861, Gobineau returned to Tehran as the French minister and lived a modest, ascetic lifestyle. He became obsessed with ancient Persia. This soon got out of control as he sought to prove ancient Persia was founded by his much admired Aryans, leading him to engage in what Irwin called "deranged" theories about Persia's history. In 1865 Gobineau published Les religions et les philosophies dans l'Asie centrale ("Religions and Philosophies in Central Asia"), an account of his travels in Persia and encounters with the various esoteric Islamic sects he discovered being practiced in the Persian countryside. His mystical frame of mind led him to feel in Persia what he called "un certain plaisir" ("a certain pleasure") as nowhere else in the world did he feel the same sort of joy he felt when viewing the ruins of Persia.

Gobineau had a low opinion of Islam, a religion invented by the Arab Mohammed. He viewed him as part of the "Semitic race", unlike the Persians whose Indo-European language led him to see them as Aryans. Gobineau believed that Shia Islam was part of a "revolt" by the Aryan Persians against the Semitic Arabs, seeing a close connection between Shia Islam and Persian nationalism. Based on his own experiences, Gobineau believed the Persians did not really believe in Islam, with the faith of the Prophet being a cover over a society that still preserved many pre-Islamic features. Gobineau also described the savage persecution of the followers of Bábism and of the new religion of the Baháʼí Faith by the Persian state, which was determined to uphold Shia Islam as the state religion. Gobineau approved of the persecution of the Babi. He wrote they were "veritable communists" and "true and pure supporters of socialism", as every bit as dangerous as the French socialists. He agreed the Peacock Throne was right to stamp out Bábism. Gobineau was one of the first Westerners to examine the esoteric sects of Persia. Though his work was idiosyncratic, he did spark scholarly interest in an aspect of Persia that had been ignored by Westerners until then.

==== Criticism of Gobineau's Persian work ====
Only with his studies in ancient Persia did Gobineau come under fire from scholars. He published two books on ancient Persia, Lectures des textes cunéiformes (1858) ("Readings of Cuneiform Texts") and Traité des écritures cunéiformes (1864) ("Treatise of Cuneiform Fragments"). Irwin wrote: "The first treatise is wrong-headed, yet still on this side of sanity; the second later and much longer work shows many signs of the kind of derangement that is likely to infect those who interest themselves too closely in the study of occultism." One of the principal problems with Gobineau's approach to translating the cuneiform texts of ancient Persia was that he failed to understand linguistic change and that Old Persian was not the same language as modern Persian. His books met with hostile reception from scholars who argued that Gobineau simply did not understand the texts he was purporting to translate.

Gobineau's article attempting to rebut his critics in the Journal asiatique was not published, as the editors considered his article "unpublishable" as it was full of "absurd" claims and vitriolic abuse of his critics. During his second time in Persia, Gobineau spent much time working as an amateur archeologist and gathering material for what was to become Traité des écritures cunéiformes, a book that Irwin called "a monument to learned madness". Gobineau was always very proud of it, seeing the book as a magnum opus that rivaled the Essai. Gobineau had often traveled from Tehran to the Ottoman Empire to visit the ruins of Dur-Sharrukin at Khorsabad, near Mosul in what is now northern Iraq. The ruins of Khorsabad are Assyrian, built by King Sargon II in 717 BC, but Gobineau believed the ruins were actually Persian and built by Darius the Great some two hundred years later.

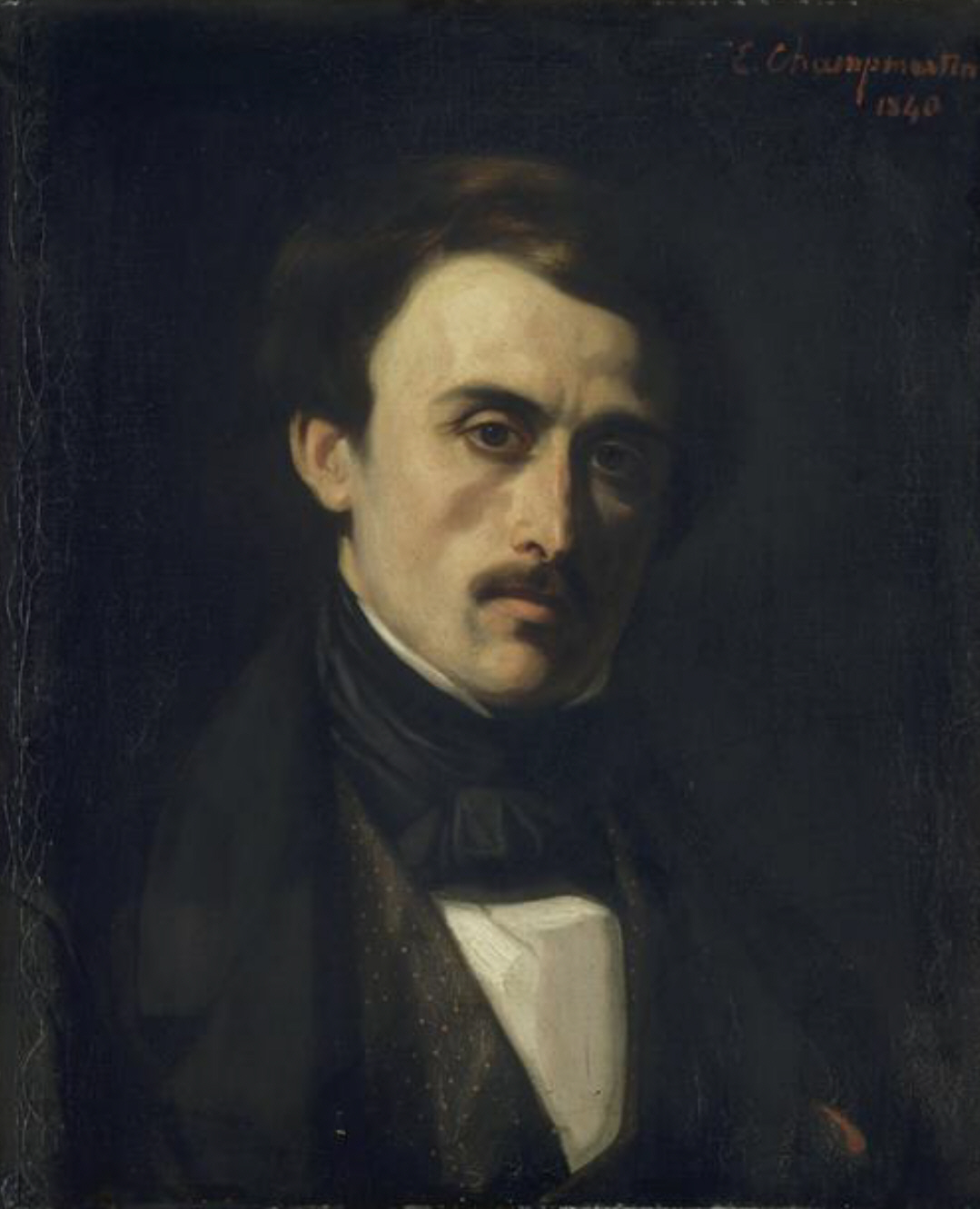
French archaeologist Paul-Émile Botta (pictured) regarded Gobineau's Persian work as nonsense.

French archeologist Paul-Émile Botta published a scathing review of Traité des écritures cunéiformes in the Journal asiatique. He wrote the cuneiform texts at the Dur-Sharrukin were Akkadian, that Gobineau did not know what he was talking about, and the only reason he had even written the review was to prove that he had wasted his time reading the book. As Gobineau insistently pressed his thesis, the leading Orientalist in France, Julius von Mohl of the Société Asiatique, was forced to intervene in the dispute to argue that Gobineau's theories lacked "scientific rigor" while he admired the "artistry" of Gobineau's thesis.

Continuing his interest in Persia, Gobineau published Histoire des Perses ("History of the Persians") in 1869. In it he did not attempt to distinguish between Persian history and legends treating the Shahnameh and the Kush Nama (a 12th-century poem presenting a legendary story of two Chinese emperors) as factual, reliable accounts of Persia's ancient history. As such, Gobineau began his history by presenting the Persians as Aryans who arrived in Persia from Central Asia and conquered the race of giants known to them as the Diws. Gobineau also added his own racial theories to the Histoire des Perses, explaining how Cyrus the Great had planned the migration of the Aryans into Europe making him responsible for the "grandeur" of medieval Europe. For Gobineau, Cyrus the Great was the greatest leader in history, writing: "Whatever we ourselves are, as Frenchmen, Englishmen, Germans, Europeans of the nineteenth century, it is to Cyrus that we owe it", going on to call Cyrus as "the greatest of the great men in all human history".

=== Minister to Greece ===
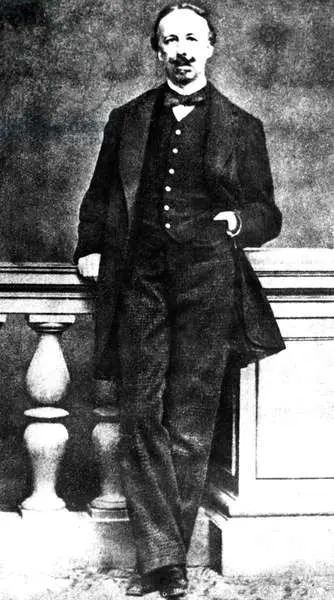
Arthur de Gobineau c.(1865)

In 1864, Gobineau became the French minister to Greece. During his time in Athens, which with Tehran were the only cities he was stationed in that he liked, he spent his time writing poetry and learning about sculpture when not traveling with Ernest Renan in the Greek countryside in search of ruins. Gobineau seduced two sisters in Athens, Zoé and Marika Dragoumis, who became his mistresses; Zoé remained a lifelong correspondent.

In 1832, although nominally independent, Greece had become a joint Anglo-French-Russian protectorate. As such the British, French and Russian ministers in Athens had the theoretical power to countermand any decision of the Greek cabinet. Gobineau repeatedly advised against France exercising this power, writing Greece was "the sad and living evidence of European ineptness and presumptuousness". He attacked the British attempt to bring Westminster-style democracy to Greece as bringing about "the complete decay of a barbarous land" while accusing the French of being guilty of introducing the Greeks to "the most inept Voltairianism". However, during his later years, the Greek economy began to grow rapidly; due to this, Gobineau "became so impressed by the Greek economic and social development that he unwittingly acknowledged the benefits of the modern era". After that point, he showed sympathy for the contemporary Greek society building a modern state.

About the "Eastern Question", Gobineau was initially in favor of Greek expansionism; he was a supporter of Ioannis Kolettis and his Megali Idea. However, later on, he advised against French support for the irredentist Greek aspirations, writing the Greeks could not replace the Ottoman Empire, and if the Ottoman Empire should be replaced with a greater Greece, only Russia would benefit. He no longer believed that a revived "Greek empire" could thwart Russian imperialism. He believed that the Ottoman Empire was more suitable to do so at the time. Gobineau advised Paris: "The Greeks will not control the Orient, neither will the Armenians nor the Slav nor any Christian population, and, at the same time, if others were to come—even the Russians, the most oriental of them all—they could only submit to the harmful influences of this anarchic situation. [...] For me [...] there is no Eastern Question and if I had the honour of being a great government I should concern myself no longer with developments in these areas." In the spring of 1866, Christian Greeks rebelled against the Ottoman Empire on the island of Crete. Three emissaries arrived in Athens to ask Gobineau for French support for the uprising, saying it was well known that France was the champion of justice and the rights of "small nations". As France was heavily engaged in the war in Mexico Gobineau, speaking for Napoleon III, informed the Cretans to expect no support from France—they were on their own in taking on the Ottoman Empire. He called the uprising "the most perfect monument to lies, mischief and impudence that has been seen in thirty years". He had no sympathy with the Greek desire to liberate their compatriots living under Ottoman rule; writing to his friend Anton von Prokesch-Osten he noted: "It is one rabble against another". In his elderly years, however, he returned to his original position, supporting Greek irredentist ideas.

==== Recall to France as a result of Cretan revolt ====
During the Cretan revolt, a young French academic Gustave Flourens, noted for his fiery enthusiasm for liberal causes, had joined the Cretean uprising and had gone to Athens to try to persuade the Greek government to support it. Gobineau had unwisely shown Flourens diplomatic dispatches from Paris showing both the French and Greek governments were unwilling to offend the Ottomans by supporting the Cretan uprising, which Flourens then leaked to the press. Gobineau received orders from Napoleon III to silence Flourens. On 28 May 1868, while Flourens was heading for a meeting with King George I, he was intercepted by Gobineau who had him arrested by the legation guards, put into chains and loaded onto the first French ship heading for Marseille. L'affaire Flourens became a cause célèbre in France with novelist Victor Hugo condemning Gobineau in an opinion piece in Le Tribute on 19 July 1868 for the treacherous way he had treated a fellow Frenchman fighting for Greek freedom. With French public opinion widely condemning the minister in Athens, Gobineau was recalled to Paris in disgrace.

==== Views on Greeks ====
His views about modern Greeks were paradoxical and ambiguous; he stated his ideas somewhat vaguely and confusedly, basing them only on general information. He wrote that the Greek people had generally lost a lot of the "Aryan blood" responsible for "the glory that was Greece" due to miscegenation. However, he did not deny the existence of the ancient Greek nucleus in modern Greeks. Instead, he believed that the Greek race had "absorbed" all of the foreign invaders. The result of this was a strong alloy, since the Greeks had integrated the best traits of the people they came into contact with. He concluded that the Greeks demonstrated all the requisite qualities to earn the accolade "nationality".

Gobineau, indeed, admired the modern Greeks, considering them the "educators" of the Balkan people; he saw Greeks as more intelligent, cultivated, and industrious than Balkaners and he thought that Greece was destined to play a civilizing role in the entire Danubian region. Outside of politics, he also considered the Greeks to be a patient, amiable, creative, and sincere people.

==== Assessments ====
In 1868, Gobineau wrote that, without Greece, he would not have been able to do many of the things that he did ("Sans la Grèce, je n'aurais pas fait beaucoup de choses que j'ai faites. La Grèce y est pour beaucoup"). According to anthropologist Ivo T. Budil:

Gobineau’s experience of Greece involved permanent controversy between ideology and reality, while reality prevailed. In Greece, Gobineau managed to come to terms with manifestations of modernity, nationalism and economic development... [He] was in a certain sense intellectually "liberated" by Greece and forced sometimes to abandon his racial schemes and stereotypes and accept the diversity and contradictions of real life.

Gobineau's legacy in Greece after his death was ambivalent. The Greek philologist and historian Konstantinos Dimaras considered him a genuine philhellene whose words and actions were misunderstood.

=== Minister to Brazil ===
In 1869, Gobineau was appointed the French minister to Brazil. At the time, France and Brazil did not have diplomatic relations at an ambassadorial level, only legations headed by ministers. Gobineau was unhappy the Quai d'Orsay had sent him to Brazil, which he viewed as an insufficiently grand posting. Gobineau landed in Rio de Janeiro during the riotously sensual Carnival, which disgusted him. From that moment on he detested Brazil, which he saw as a culturally backward and unsanitary place of diseases. He feared falling victim to the yellow fever that decimated the population of Brazil on a regular basis. Gobineau's major duties during his time in Brazil from March 1869 to April 1870 were to help mediate the end of the Paraguayan War and seek compensation after Brazilian troops looted the French legation in Asunción. He did so and was equally successful in negotiating an extradition treaty between the French Empire and the Empire of Brazil. He dropped hints to Emperor Pedro II that French public opinion favored the emancipation of Brazil's slaves. As slavery was the basis of Brazil's economy, and Brazil had the largest slave population in the Americas, Pedro II was unwilling to abolish slavery at this time.

As most Brazilians have a mixture of Portuguese, African and Indian ancestry, Gobineau saw the Brazilian people, whom he loathed, as confirming his theories about the perils of miscegenation. He wrote to Paris that Brazilians were "a population totally mixed, vitiated in its blood and spirit, fearfully ugly ... Not a single Brazilian has pure blood because of the pattern of marriages among whites, Indians and Negroes is so widespread that the nuances of color are infinite, causing a degeneration among the lower as well the upper classes". He noted Brazilians are "neither hard-working, active nor fertile". Based on all this, Gobineau reached the conclusion that all human life would cease in Brazil within the next 200 years on the grounds of "genetic degeneracy".

Gobineau was unpopular in Brazil. His letters to Paris show his complete contempt for everybody in Brazil, regardless of their nationality (except for the Emperor Pedro II), with his most damning words reserved for Brazilians. He wrote about Brazil: "Everyone is ugly here, unbelievably ugly, like apes". His only friend during his time in Rio was Emperor Pedro II, whom Gobineau praised as a wise and great leader, noting his blue eyes and blond hair as proof that Pedro was an Aryan. The fact Pedro was of the House of Braganza left Gobineau assured he had no African or Indian blood. Gobineau wrote: "Except for the Emperor there is no one in this desert full of thieves" who was worthy of his friendship.

Gobineau's attitudes of contempt for the Brazilian people led him to spend much of his time feuding with the Brazilian elite. In 1870 he was involved in a bloody street brawl with the son-in-law of a Brazilian senator who did not appreciate having his nation being put down. As a result of the brawl, Pedro II asked Paris to have his friend recalled, or he would declare him persona non-grata. Rather than suffer the humiliation of this happening to the French minister the Quai d'Orsay promptly recalled Gobineau.

=== Return to France ===
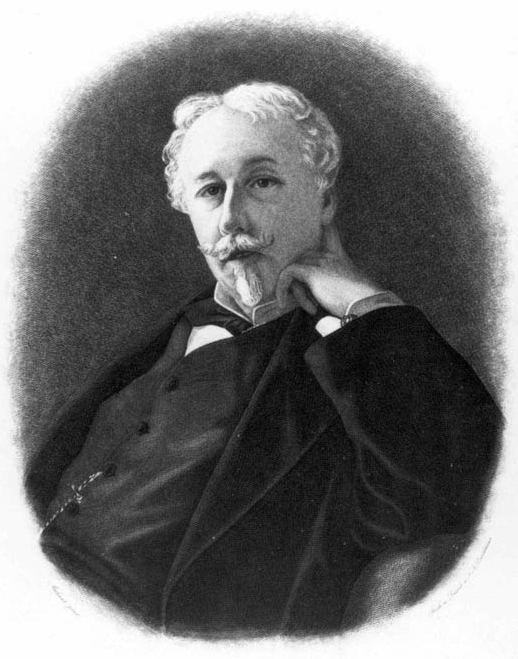
1876 portrait of Gobineau by Mathilde Sallier de La Tour

In May 1870 Gobineau returned to France from Brazil. In a letter to Tocqueville in 1859 he wrote, "When we come to the French people, I genuinely favor absolute power", and as long as Napoleon III ruled as an autocrat, he had Gobineau's support. Gobineau had often predicted France was so rotten the French were bound to be defeated if they ever fought a major war. At the outbreak of the war with Prussia in July 1870, however, he believed they would win within a few weeks. After the German victory, Gobineau triumphantly used his own country's defeat as proof of his racial theories. He spent the war as the maire (mayor) of the little town of Trie in Oise department. After the Prussians occupied Trie, Gobineau established good relations with them and was able to reduce the indemnity imposed on Oise department.

Later, Gobineau wrote a book Ce qui est arrivé à la France en 1870 ("What Happened to France in 1870") explaining the French defeat was due to racial degeneration, which no publisher chose to publish. He argued the French bourgeoisie were "descended from Gallo-Roman slaves", which explained why they were no match for an army commanded by Junkers. Gobineau attacked Napoleon III for his plans to rebuild Paris writing: "This city, pompously described as the capital of the universe, is in reality only the vast caravanserai for the idleness, greed and carousing of all Europe."

In 1871, poet Wilfrid Scawen Blunt who met Gobineau described him thus:

Gobineau is a man of about 55, with grey hair and moustache, dark rather prominent eyes, sallow complexion, and tall figure with brisk almost jerky gait. In temperament he is nervous, energetic in manner, observant, but distrait, passing rapidly from thought to thought, a good talker but a bad listener. He is a savant, novelist, poet, sculptor, archaeologist, a man of taste, a man of the world."

Despite his embittered view of the world and misanthropic attitudes, Gobineau was capable of displaying much charm when he wanted to. He was described by historian Albert Sorel as "a man of grace and charm" who would have made a perfect diplomat in Ancien Régime France.

=== Minister to Sweden ===
In May 1872, Gobineau was appointed the French minister to Sweden. After arriving in Stockholm, he wrote to his sister Caroline: "This is the pure race of the North—that of the masters", calling the Swedes "the purest branch of the Germanic race". In contrast to France, Gobineau was impressed with the lack of social conflict in Sweden, writing to Dragoumis: "There is no class hatred. The nobility lives on friendly terms with the middle class and with the people at large". Gobineau argued that because of Sweden's remote location in Scandinavia, Aryan blood had been better preserved as compared to France. Writing about the accession of Oscar II to the Swedish throne in 1872 he said: "This country is unique ... I have just seen one king die and another ascend the throne without anyone doubling the guard or alerting a soldier". The essential conservatism of Swedish society also impressed Gobineau as he wrote to Pedro II: "The conservative feeling is amongst the most powerful in the national spirit and these people relinquish the past only step by step and with extreme caution".

Sweden presented a problem for Gobineau between reconciling his belief in an Aryan master race with his insistence that only the upper classes were Aryans. He eventually resolved this by denouncing the Swedes as debased Aryans after all. He used the fact King Oscar allowed Swedish democracy to exist and did not try to rule as an absolute monarch as evidence the House of Bernadotte were all weak and cowardly kings. By 1875, Gobineau was writing, "Sweden horrifies me" and wrote with disgust about "Swedish vulgarity and contemptibility".

In 1874, Gobineau met the homosexual German diplomat Philipp, Prince of Eulenburg, in Stockholm and became very close to him. Eulenburg was later to recall fondly how he and Gobineau had spent hours during their time in Sweden under the "Nordic sky, where the old world of the gods lived on in the customs and habits of the people as well in their hearts." Gobineau later wrote that only two people in the entire world had ever properly understood his racist philosophy, namely Richard Wagner and Eulenburg.

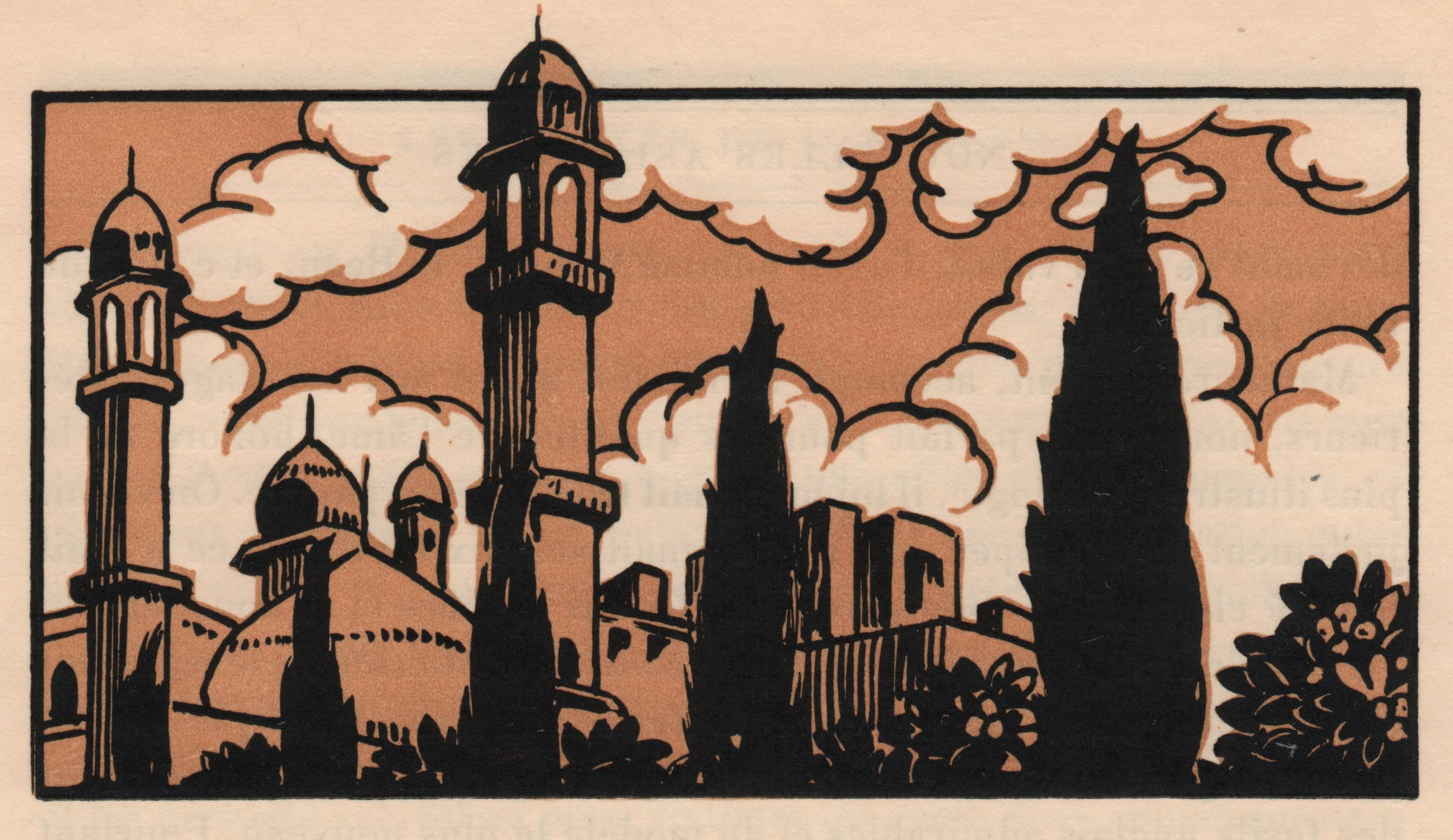
An illustration from Gobineau's novel Nouvelle Asiatiques, published while he was in Sweden. The book reflected his long-standing interest in Persia and the Orient.

Gobineau encouraged Eulenburg to promote his theory of an Aryan master-race, telling him: "In this way you will help many people understand things sooner." Later, Eulenburg was to complain all of his letters to Gobineau had to be destroyed because "They contain too much of an intimately personal nature". During his time in Sweden, Gobineau became obsessed with the Vikings and became intent on proving he was descended from the Norse. His time in Stockholm was a very productive period from a literary viewpoint. He wrote Les Pléiades ("The Pleiades"), Les Nouvelles Asiatiques ("The New Asians"), La Renaissance, most of Histoire de Ottar Jarl, pirate norvégien conquérant du pays de Bray en Normandie et de sa descendance ("History of Ottar Jarl, Norwegian Pirate and Conqueror of Normandy and his Descendants") and completed the first half of his epic poem Amadis while serving as minister to Sweden. Amadis is a 12,000 verse epic poem published posthumously in 1887 which concludes with its protagonists drowning in the blood of the Chinese they have killed.

In 1879, Gobineau attempted to prove his own racial superiority over the rest of the French with his pseudo-family history Histoire de Ottar Jarl. It begins with the line "I descend from Odin", and traces his supposed descent from the Viking Ottar Jarl. As the de Gobineau family first appeared in history in late 15th century Bordeaux, and Ottar Jarl—who may or may not have been a real person—is said to have lived in the 10th century, Gobineau had to resort to a great deal of invention to make his genealogy work. For him, the Essai, the Histoire des Perses and Histoire de Ottar Jarl comprised a trilogy, what the French critic Jean Caulmier called "a poetic vision of the human adventure", covering the universal history of all races in the Essai, to the history of the Aryan branch in Persia in Histoire des Perses to his own family's history in Histoire de Ottar Jarl.

During his time in Sweden, although remaining outwardly faithful to the Catholic Church, Gobineau privately abandoned his belief in Christianity. He was very interested in the pagan religion of the Vikings, which seemed more authentically Aryan to him. For him, maintaining his Catholicism was a symbol of his reactionary politics and rejection of liberalism, and it was for these reasons he continued to nominally observe Catholicism. Gobineau told his friend the Comte de Basterot that he wanted a Catholic burial only because the de Gobineaus had always been buried in Catholic ceremonies, not because of any belief in Catholicism.

For leaving his post in Stockholm without permission to join the Emperor Pedro II on his European visit, Gobineau was told in January 1877 to either resign from the Quai d'Orsay or be fired; he chose the former.

Gobineau spent his last years living in Rome, a lonely and embittered man whose principal friends were the Wagners and Eulenburg. He saw himself as a great sculptor and attempted to support himself by selling his sculpture.

== Legacy and influence ==
Gobineau's ideas were influential in a number of countries, especially Romania, Ottoman Empire, Germany, and Brazil, both during his lifetime and after his death. Social Darwinists in Japan used Gobineau's categorizing of the three races as justification for a Japanese imperialism that sought to civilize other peoples of the "yellow" race while avoiding mixing with "white" or "black" races.

== Works in English translation ==
=== Non-fiction ===
- The Moral and Intellectual Diversity of Races, J. B. Lippincott & Co., 1856 (rep. by Garland Pub., 1984).
  - The Inequality of Human Races, G. P. Putnam's Sons, 1915.
  - The Inequality of Human Races, William Heinemann, 1915 [Thurland & Thurland, 1915; Howard Fertig Pub., 1967; Rep., 1999].
- Method of Reading Cuneiform Texts, Educational Society's Press, 1865.
- Gobineau: Selected Political Writing, Michael D. Biddiss (ed.), Jonathan Cape, 1970.
- The World of the Persians, J. Gifford, 1971.
- The French Encounter with Africans, William B. Cohen, Bloomington: Indiana University Press, 1980.
- A Gentleman in the Outports: Gobineau and Newfoundland, Carleton University Press, 1993.
- Comte de Gobineau and Orientalism: Selected Eastern Writings, Geoffrey Nash (ed.), Routledge, 2008.

=== Fiction ===
- Typhaines Abbey: A Tale of the Twelfth Century, Claxton, Remsen and Haffelfinger, 1869.
- Romances of the East, D. Appleton and Company, 1878 [Rep. by Arno Press, 1973].
  - "The History of Gamber-Ali." In The Universal Anthology, Vol. XX, Merrill & Baker, 1899.
  - Five Oriental Tales, The Viking Press, 1925.
  - The Dancing Girl of Shamakha and other Asiatic Tales, Harcourt, Brace and Company, 1926.
  - Tales of Asia, Geoffrey Bles, 1947.
  - Mademoiselle Irnois and Other Stories, University of California Press, 1988.
- The Renaissance: Savonarola. Cesare Borgia. Julius II. Leo X. Michael Angelo, G. P. Putnam's Sons, 1913 [Rep. by George Allen & Unwin, 1927].
- The Golden Flower, G. P. Putnam's Sons, 1924 [Rep. by Books for Libraries Press, 1968].
- The Lucky Prisoner, Doubleday, Page and Company, 1926 [Rep. by Bretano's, 1930].
- The Crimson Handkerchief: and other Stories, Harper & Brothers, 1927 [Rep. by Jonathan Cape: London, 1929].
- The Pleiads, A. A. Knopf, 1928.
  - Sons of Kings, Oxford University Press, 1966.
  - The Pleiads, Howard Fertig Pub., 1978

== Sources ==
- Akçam, Taner (2006). A Shameful Act – The Armenian Genocide and the Question of Turkish Responsibility. New York: Metropolitan. ISBN 978-0805079326.
- Bell, Richard H. (2013). Wagner's Parsifal: An Appreciation in the Light of His Theological Journey. Cascade Books.
- Biddiss, Michael D. (1970). Father of Racist Ideology: The Social and Political Thought of Count Gobineau. Littlehampton Book Services Ltd. ISBN 978-0297000853.
- Biddiss, Michael D. (1997). "History as Destiny: Gobineau, H. S. Chamberlain and Spengler". Transactions of the Royal Historical Society. 7: 73–100. doi:10.2307/3679271. JSTOR 3679271. S2CID 163004517.
- Blue, Gregory (1999). "Gobineau on China: Race Theory, the "Yellow Peril" and the Critique of Modernity"". Journal of World History. 10 (1): 93–139. doi:10.1353/jwh.2005.0003. JSTOR 20078751. S2CID 143762514.
- Bucur, Maria (2010). Eugenics and Modernization in Interwar Romania. Pittsburgh, PA: University of Pittsburgh Press. ISBN 978-0822961260.
- Budil, Ivo (2008). Arthur Gobineau and Greece. A view of a man of letters and diplomat. Prague Papers on the History of International Relations.
- Burke, Peter; Pallares-Burke, Maria Lúcia (2008). Gilberto Freyre: Social Theory in the Tropics. New York: Peter Lang Ltd. ISBN 978-1906165093.
- Davies, Alan (1988). Infected Christianity: A Study of Modern Racism. McGill-Queen's University Press. ISBN 9780773506510. JSTOR j.ctt80fx5.
- Dimaras, Konstantinos Th. (1936). "Γκομπινώ. – εφ. Eλεύθερον Bήμα, 28 Δεκεμβρίου 1936". To Vima.
- Domeier, Norman (2015). The Eulenburg Affair: A Cultural History of Politics in the German Empire. Martlesham, Suffolk: Boydell & Brewer. ISBN 978-1571139122.
- Dontas, Domna N. (1966). Greece and the Great Powers, 1863–1875. Institute for Balkan Studies.
- Drayton, Richard (2011). "Gilberto Freyre and the Twentieth-Century Rethinking of Race in Latin America". Portuguese Studies. 27 (1): 43–47. doi:10.5699/portstudies.27.1.0043. JSTOR 10.5699/portstudies.27.1.0043. S2CID 161917205.
- Drummond, Elizabeth (2005). "Schemann, Ludwig (1852–1938)". In Levy, Richard S. (ed.). Antisemitism A Historical Encyclopedia of Prejudice and Persecution. Santa Barbara, CA: ABC-CLIO. ISBN 978-1-85109-439-4.
- Field, Geoffrey G. (1981). Evangelist of race : The Germanic Vision of Houston Stewart Chamberlain. New York: Columbia University Press. ISBN 0-231-04860-2.
- Fortier, Paul (Autumn 1967). "Gobineau and German Racism". Comparative Literature. 19 (4): 341–350. doi:10.2307/1769493. JSTOR 1769493.
- Gobineau, Arthur de (1993). Michael Wilkshire (ed.). A Gentleman in the Outports: Gobineau and Newfoundland. Ottawa: Carleton University Press. ISBN 9780886292140. JSTOR j.ctt1cd0m3n.
- Gobineau, Arthur de (1970). "Events in Asia". In Michael Biddiss, London (ed.). Gobineau Selected Political Writings.
- Irwin, Robert (2016). Gobineau the Would be Orientalist. Vol. 26. The Journal of the Royal Asiatic Society.
- Kale, Steven (2010). "Gobineau, Racism, and Legitimism: A Royalist Heretic in Nineteenth-Century France". Modern Intellectual History. 7 (1).
- Klemperer, Victor (2000) [1957]. The Language of the Third Reich. Translated by Martin Brady. Continuum. ISBN 978-0-8264-9130-5.
- Magee, Bryan (2002). The Tristan Chord. New York: Owl Books. ISBN 0-8050-7189-X. (UK title: Wagner and Philosophy, Penguin Books, ISBN 0-14-029519-4)
- Röhl, John C.G. (1994). The Kaiser and his Court: Wilhelm II and the Government of Germany. Cambridge, UK: Cambridge University Press. ISBN 978-1316529829.
- Rowbotham, Arnold (1939). "Gobineau and the Aryan Terror". The Sewanee Review. 47 (2): 152–165. JSTOR 27535529.
- Skidmore, Thomas E. (1993). Black into White: Race and Nationality in Brazilian Thought. Durham, NC: Duke University Press. ISBN 978-0822313205.
- Stewart, Charles (2003). "Syncretism as a dimension of nationalist discourse in modern Greece". In Shaw, Rosalind; Stewart, Charles (eds.). Syncretism/Anti-Syncretism: The Politics of Religious Synthesis. Routledge. ISBN 978-1-134-83395-5.
- Vacalopoulos, Ap (1 January 1968). "Byzantinism and Hellenism : remarks on the racial origin and the intellectual continuity of the Greek nation". Balkan Studies. 9 (1): 101–126. ISSN 2241-1674.
- Wilkshire, Michael (1993). "Introduction: Gobineau and Newfoundland". In Michael Wilkshire (ed.). Gentleman in the Outports: Gobineau and Newfoundland. Carleton Library Series. McGill-Queen's University Press. ISBN 9780886292140. JSTOR j.ctt1cd0m3n.
- Wright, Michelle (1999). Nigger Peasants from France: Missing Translations of American Anxieties on Race and the Nation. Vol. 22. Callaloo.
