= Marcelle Lalou =

French Tibetologist

Marcelle Lalou (French pronunciation: [maʁsɛl lalu]; 1890–1967) was a 20th-century French Tibetologist. Her major contribution to Tibetology was the cataloging of the entire Pelliot collection of Old Tibetan manuscripts from Dunhuang at the Bibliothèque nationale de France. In addition to her cataloging work, she wrote articles on various aspects of Old Tibet, and she published a Tibetan textbook. Some of her most notable students include Rolf A. Stein and J. W. de Jong.

Lalou was born on August 23, 1890, in Meudon-Bellevue, located between Paris and Versailles. From an early age, she developed an interest in art and continued painting and drawing for pleasure throughout her life. She began her studies in Art History, and many of her early publications focused on art-historical themes.

Lalou volunteered as a nurse in the first world war. She made her start in Buddhist Studies following the war, studying Sanskrit with Sylvain Lévi and Tibetan with Jacques Bacot. She finished her doctorate in 1927 at the École Pratique des Hautes Études, where she later taught from 1938 to 1963. She was the secretary and later manager for the Bibliographie Bouddhique, and she was the chief editor of Journal Asiatique from 1950 to 1966. For her work, Lalou was dubbed a Knight of the Légion d'honneur.

== Works of Marcelle Lalou ==
- 1921
  - Méghadouta (Le nuage messager) de Kālidāsa, Paris, « Sans Pareil », 1921, in-16, 69 pages.
- 1925
  - "Trois récits du Dulva reconnus à Ajantā", in Journal Asiatique, 1925, p. 333-337.
- 1927
  - "La version tibétaine du Ratnakūṭa. Contribution à la bibliographie du Kanjur", in Journal Asiatique, oct.-déc. 1927, p. 233-259.
- 1929
  - "Notes sur la décoration des monastères bouddhiques, à propos d'un livre récent, de M. Goloubew", in, 5e année, 3, 1929, p. 87-102.
  - "La version tibétaine des Prajnāpāramitā", in Journal Asiatique, juill.-sept. 1929, p. 87-102.
- 1930
  - Iconographie des étoffes peintes (pata) dans le Mañjuśrīmūlakalpa, dans Buddhica, 1re série, VI, Paris, Geuthner, 1930, in-8°, 116 pages, 7 planches hors texte.
- 1931
  - "Catalogue des fonds tibétains de la Bibliothèque nationale, IVe partie : I. Les Mdo-man", in Buddhica, 2e série, IV, Paris, Geuthner, 1931, in-8°.
  - “Rétrospective: l’œuvre de Léon Feer.” Bibliographie bouddhique II (1931): 1-17.
- 1932
  - "Un traité de magie bouddhique", in Études d'orientalisme... à la mémoire de Raymonde Linossier, Paris, Leroux, 1932, t. II, p. 303-322.
- 1933
  - "Le da drag tibétain" in Bulletin of the School of Oriental Studies VII, janv. 1933, p. 87-89. (with J. Przyluski)
  - Répertoire du Tanjur d'après le catalogue de P. Cordier, avec une préface de Paul Pelliot, Paris, Bibliothèque nationale, 1933.
- 1934
  - Rétrospective : l'œuvre de M. le professeur Paul Pelliot, in Bibliographie bouddhique, IV-V, 1934, p. 1-29.
- 1935
  - Louis de La Vallée Poussin, dans Mélanges chinois et bouddhiques, VI, 1939, p. 5-10, 1 photo (en collaboration avec J. Przyluski).
  - Trois aspects de la peinture bouddhique, dans Annuaire de l'Institut de Philologie et de d’Histoire orientale, III, Bruxelles, 1935, p. 245-261, 9 planches. (Originally delivered at the Conférence faite à l'Institut d'histoire et de philologie orientales, de l'Université de Bruxelles, le 27 avril 1934.)
- 1936
  - "Mañjuśrīmūlakalpa et Tārāmūlakalpa." Harvard Journal of Asiatic Studies, 1936, p. 327-349.
  - Les « Cent mille nāga », Festschrift Moriz Winternitz, Leipzig, Harras-sowitz, 1933, p. 79-81.
  - "Notes à propos d'une amulette de Touen-houang : les litanies de Tārā et la Sitātapatrādhāranī." Mélanges chinois et bouddhiques, IV, 1936, p. 135-149,1 planche.
  - "Récits populaires et contes bouddhiques." Journal Asiatique, avril-juin 1936, p. 177-191 (with J. Przyluski).
  - "L'Histoire de Rāma en tibétain", in Journal Asiatique, octobre-décembre 1936, p. 560-562.
- 1937
  - "Ganeśa-Vaiśavana." Journal Asiatique 1937, p. 301-302.
- 1938
  - "A Tun-huang prelude to the Karandavyūha", in Indian Historical Quarterly XIV, 1938, p. 198-200.
  - "Notes de mythologie bouddhique : 1. Yaksa et Gandharva dans le Mahāsamayasuttanta" in Harvard Journal of Asiatic Studies, 3.1, 1938, p. 40-46 (in collaboration with J. Przyluski).
  - Notes de mythologie bouddhique : 2. Les Rgyud sum-pa manuscrits de Touen-houang, in Harvard Journal of Asiatic Studies, 1938, p. 126-136.
  - Le culte des Nāga et la thérapeutique, in Journal Asiatique, 1938, p. 1-20.
  - "Document tibétain sur l'expansion du Dhyāna chinois", in Journal Asiatique, 1939, p. 505-523.
- 1939
  - Notes de mythologie bouddhique : 3. Les fils de Brahmā, dans Harvard Journal of Asiatic Studies, 4, 1939, p. 69-76 (with J. Przyluski).
  - "Sur la langue « nam »", in Journal Asiatique, 1939, p 453.
  - Inventaire des manuscrits tibétains de Touen-houang conservés à la Bibliothèque nationale (Fonds Pelliot-tibétain, nos 1-849), Paris, Adrien-Maisonneuve, 1939, in-4°, VII, XVI et 186 pages.
- 1940
  - Tun-huang Tibetan document on a Dharmadāna, dans Indian Historical Quarterly, XVI, 2, 1940, p. 292-298.
  - Les manuscrits tibétains de Touen-houang conservés à la Bibliothèque nationale de Paris, recueil des communications faites au Congrès international des Orientalistes, Bruxelles, 1938, p. 37, et AXXCIO, 1940, p. 292-298.
- 1941
  - Texte médical tibétain. Journal Asiatique (1941): 209-211.
- 1945
  - Obituary notice : Jean Przyluski, dans Indian Historical Quarterly, XXI, 2, June 1945, p. 157-162
- 1946
  - Mythologie indienne et peintures de Haute Asie : I. Le dieu bouddhique de la Fortune, dans Artibus Asiae, 1946, p. 97-111, 4 planches, 10 figures.
  - Un savant français : Jean Przyluski, dans Artibus Asiae, IX, 1946, p. 144-147.
- 1947
  - Documents de Touen-houang : I. Deux prières de caravaniers tibétains; II. Croix tournantes; III. Écriture tibétaine verticale, dans Mélanges chinois et bouddhiques, VIII, 1947, p. 317-326.
- 1949
  - Les chemins du mort dans les croyances de Haute Asie, dans Actes du XXIe Congrès international des Orientalistes, Paris, Société asiatique, 1949, p. 210-212 (résumé) et Revue de l'Histoire des Religions, CXXXV, 1, 1949, p. 42-48.
  - Onze années de travaux européens sur le bouddhisme (mai 1936-mai 1947), dans Muséon, LXI, 3-4, p. 245-276.
  - Eleven years of works on Buddhism in Europe (1936–1947), dans Indian Historical Quarterly, XXV, 4, 1949.
- 1950
  - Préface à F. A. Bischoff, Contribution à l'étude des divinités mineures du bouddhisme tantrique : Āryamahābalanāma - Mahāyānasūtra, dans Buddhica, lre série, t. X, Paris, Geuthner, 1950, in-8°, p. IX-XII.
  - Le thème des dieux bisexués et celui des plantes herbacées dans les légendes de la Race solaire, dans Bulletin de l'École française d'Extrême-Orient, XLVI, 2, p. 577-580.
  - Manuel élémentaire de tibétain classique (méthode empirique), Paris Imprimerie nationale, Adrien-Maisonneuve, 1950, in-8°, v et 108 pages.
  - Inventaire des manuscrits tibétains de Touen-houang conservés à la Bibliothèque nationale (Fonds Pelliot-tibétain, nos 850-1282), Paris, Bibliothèque nationale, 1950, in-4°, VII, xv et 97 pages.
- 1951
  - Études bouddhiques. Naissance, et traditions de la bouddhologie française, dans Cinquante ans d'orientalisme français, Bulletin de la Société des Études indochinoises 1951, p. 477-481, pi. XXI.
- 1952
  - Rituel Bon.po des funérailles royales (fonds Pelliot-tibétain n° 1042), dans Journal Asiatique, 1952, p. 339-361. — Réimprimé : Manuscrits de Haute Asie, I, Paris, Société asiatique, 1953, in-8°, 24 pages, 4 planches.
  - René Grousset (1885–1952), dans Journal Asiatique, 1952, p. 387-388.
- 1953
  - "Tibétain ancien Bod/Bon" Journal Asiatique 241 (1953), p. 275-276.
  - Contribution à la bibliographie du Kanjur et du Tanjur. Les textes bouddhiques au temps du roi Khri-sron-lde-bcan, dans Journal Asiatique, 1953, p. 313-354.
- 1954
  - Les manuscrits tibétains des grandes Prajnāpāramitā trouvés à Touen-houang, dans Silver Jubilee volume of the Zinbun Kagaku-Kenkyuso, I, Kyoto, 1954., 1954, p. 257-261.
- 1955
  - Revendications des fonctionnaires du grand Tibet au VIIIe siècle, dans Journal Asiatique, 1955, p. 171-212. — Réimprimé : Manuscrits de Haute Asie, III, Paris, Société asiatique, 1955, 42 pages, 2 planches.
  - A la recherche du Vidyādharapitaka : le cycle du Subāhupariprcchātan-tra, dans Studies in Indology and Buddhology... in honour of Pr. Susumu Yamaguchi, 1955, p. 70-72.
  - Littérature tibétaine, dans « Encyclopédie de la Pléiade » : Histoire des Littératures, I, Paris, Gallimard, 1955, p. 1119-1139.
  - Rétrospective : l'œuvre de Louis de La Vallée Poussin, dans Bibliographie bouddhique, XXIII bis, Paris, 1955, p. 1-37.
- 1956
  - Four notes on Vajrapāni, dans The Adyar Library Bulletin, XX, 3-4, 1956, p. 287-293.
- 1957
  - Hold or retain? dans East and West, VII, Avril 1957, p. 328-329 (sur la signification de dhāranī).
  - Les religions du Tibet, Paris, Presses Universitaires de France, 1957, in-12, 101 pages («Mythes et Religions», n° 35).
  - Les plus anciens rouleaux tibétains trouvés à Touen-houang. Mémorial Stanislas Schayer, dans R. Or., XXI, 1957, p. 149-152.
- 1958
  - Fiefs, poisons et guérisseurs, dans Journal Asiatique, 1958, p. 157-201.
- 1959
  - Un aspect de l'avenir des études bouddhiques, dans Présence du Bouddhisme, dans France-Asie, Saigon, 1959, p. 679-680.
- 1961
  - A fifth note on Vajrapāni, dans The Adyar Library Bulletin, XXV, 1-4, 1961, p. 242-249.
  - Sūtra du bodhisattva « Roi de la Loi », dans Journal Asiatique, 1961, p. 321-332.
  - Inventaire des manuscrits tibétains de Touen-houang conservés à la Bibliothèque nationale, Paris, Bibliothèque nationale, 1961, in-4°, xii et 220 pages.
- 1962
  - Notes d'onomastique ‘A-za, dans Acta Orientalia Hugaricae, 1962. XV, 1-3, p. 207-209.
- 1964
  - Manuscrits tibétains de la Śatasāhasrikāprajñāpāramitā cachés à Touen-houang, dans Journal Asiatique, 1964, p. 479-486.
- 1965
  - Préliminaires d'une étude des ganacakra, in Studies of Esoteric Buddhism and Tantrism, Koyasan University, 1965, p. 41-46.
  - Chine et Tibet aux VIIe, VIIIe, IXe siècles, in Journal des savants, oct.-déc. 1965, p. 636-644.
  - Catalogue des principautés du Tibet ancien, in Journal Asiatique, 1965, p. 189-215.
- 1968
  - Jacques Bacot (1877–1965), in École pratique des Hautes Études. IVe section, Annuaire 1967-1968, Paris, 1968, p. 47-54, 1 photo.

== Works in Honor of Marcelle Lalou ==
- 1971 Études tibétaines dédiées à la mémoire de Marcelle Lalou Paris: Adrien Maisonneuve.

== Necrologies ==
- Macdonald, A. Annuaire de l'Ecole Practique des Hautes Etudes, IVe Section (1968–1969): 51-60.
- Filliozat, Jean. "L'oeuvre de Marcelle Lalou." Journal Asiatique (1969): 1-10.
- Rona-Tas, Andras. Acta Orientalia Hungaricae (1968): 381-383.
- Stein, Rolf. Marcelle Lalou (1890–1967). T'oung Pao (1969): 138-140.
