= Diane de Guldencrone =

French historian (1848–1930)

- Born: Diane Marguerite Gabrielle Victoire Clémence de Gobineau; 13 September 1848; Paris, Île-de-France, Second French Republic
- Died: 1 December 1930 (aged 82); Rome, Lazio, Kingdom of Italy
- Occupations: Writer, historian
- Notable work: L'Achaïe féodale : étude sur le Moyen Âge en Grèce (1205–1456); L'Italie byzantine : étude sur le haut Moyen Âge (400–1050)
- Spouse: Ode of Güldencrone
- Children: Vilhelm Christian Joseph; Huges Viggo Arthur Joseph Marie; Marie Dominique Cecilie Christine Caroline Clémence; Christian Carl Marie Joseph; Marie Sophie Frederikke

Diane de Guldencrone (née de Gobineau; 13 September 1848 – 1 December 1930) was a French historian and writer.

== Biography ==
Diane Marguerite Gabrielle Victoire Clémence de Gobineau was born in Paris, the eldest daughter of diplomat, politician and writer Arthur de Gobineau (1816–1882) and Clémence Monnerot (1816–1911).

In 1866, she married Danish baron Ove Güldencrone (1840–1880) in Athens, Greece. Baron Güldencrone was a marine officier and aide-de-camp to King George I of Greece. The couple had five children: Wilhelm (1867–1878), Arthur (1869–1895), Clémence (1872–1891), Christian (1874–1875) and Marie (1876–1890), who all died before their mother.

Diane de Guldencrone wrote two books: one about the history of Medieval Greece (spanning from the creation of the Principality of Achaea in 1205 to the siege of Athens by the Turks in 1456), and one about the history of Byzantine Italy. She died in Rome.

== Works ==
- L'Achaïe féodale : étude sur le Moyen Âge en Grèce (1205-1456) (in French). Paris: Ernest Leroux. 1886.
- L'Italie byzantine : étude sur le haut Moyen Âge (400-1050) (in French). Paris: Ernest Leroux. 1914.
