= Anton von Prokesch-Osten =

Austrian diplomat, statesman and general (1795-1876)

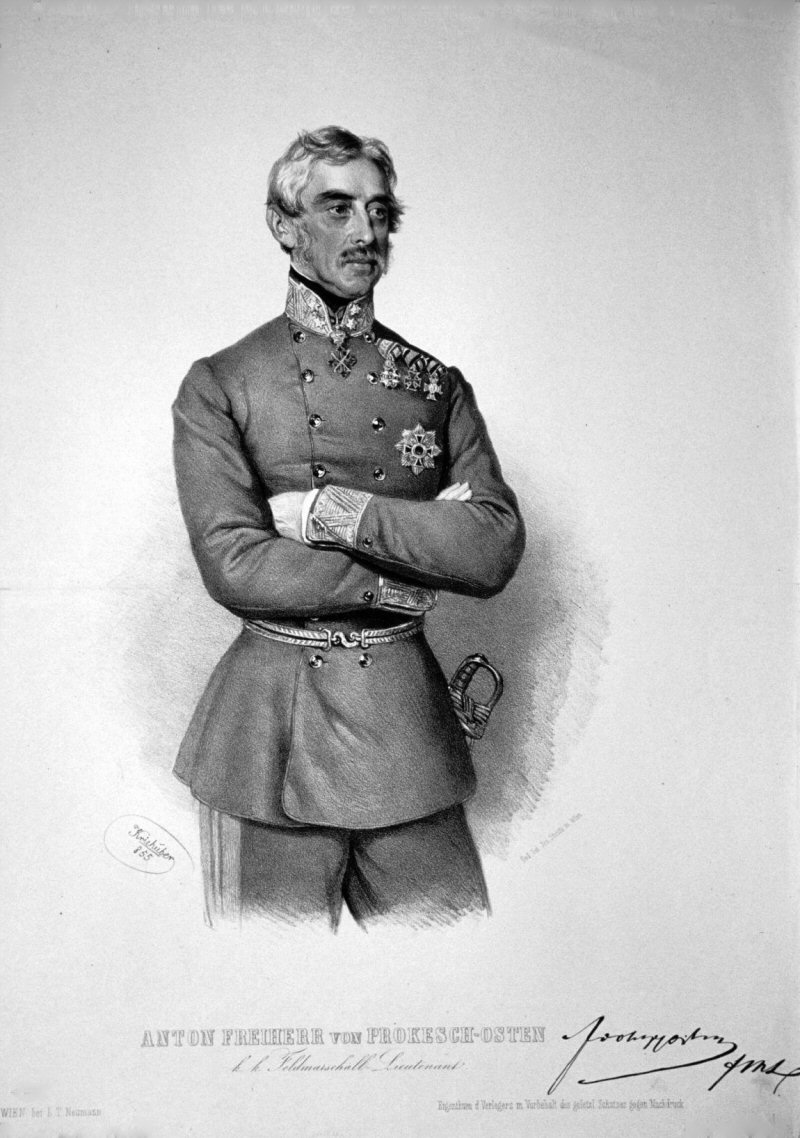
Anton von Prokesch-Osten; lithograph by Josef Kriehuber

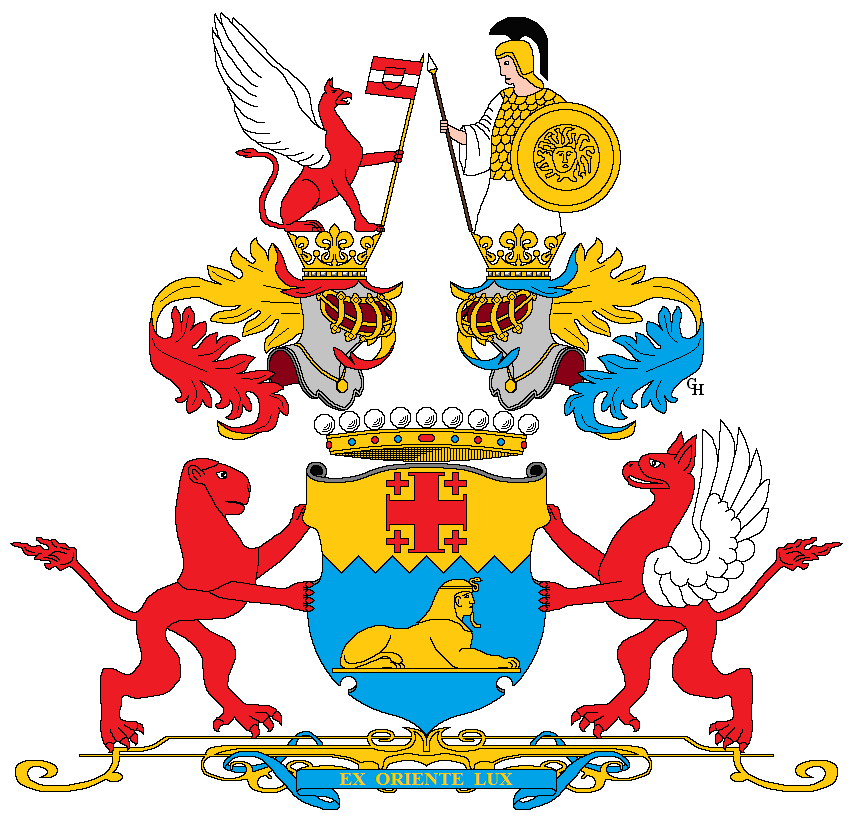
Arms granted to Prokesch von Osten in 1871

Anton von Prokesch-Osten (German: Anton Graf Prokesch von Osten; 10 December 1795 – 26 October 1876) was an Austrian diplomat, statesman and general.

== Life ==
Anton von Prokesch was born on 10 December 1795 in Graz.

He participated in the war against France in 1813–1814 and in 1815 as an officer for an order of the Archduke Charles, and then taught mathematics in a military school, before becoming, in 1818 to 1820, secretary of Marshal Karl Philipp of Schwarzenberg. He then joined the diplomatic corps at the invitation of Prince Clemens von Metternich.

From 1824 he was sent on mission to the Middle East to observe various conflicts starting with the Greek War of Independence. This appointment was a turning point in his career. He became an authority on the languages and cultures of the Middle East. In addition, numerous scholarly publications made him one of the most respected orientalist in Europe. At the same time, his political reporting won him support of the Metternich. As a Chief of Staff of the Navy since 1827 he signed convention for Christians in the Holy Land with the Pasha of Akka in 1829. In recognition of his services he was conferred the title of Ritter von Osten (meaning "Knight of the Orient") in 1830. The same year he met at a dinner, the Duke of Reichstadt, son of Napoleon I, who had read his work on Battle of Waterloo, and was enthusiastic about him, he remained a friend until his death. Anton von Prokesch went to Bologna in 1831 as Chief of Staff of the Austrian army. In 1833, he contributed to the signing of a peace between the Viceroy Muhammad Ali, pasha of Egypt, and Sultan Ottoman Mahmud II in Cairo. He was ambassador to Athens from 1834 to 1849.

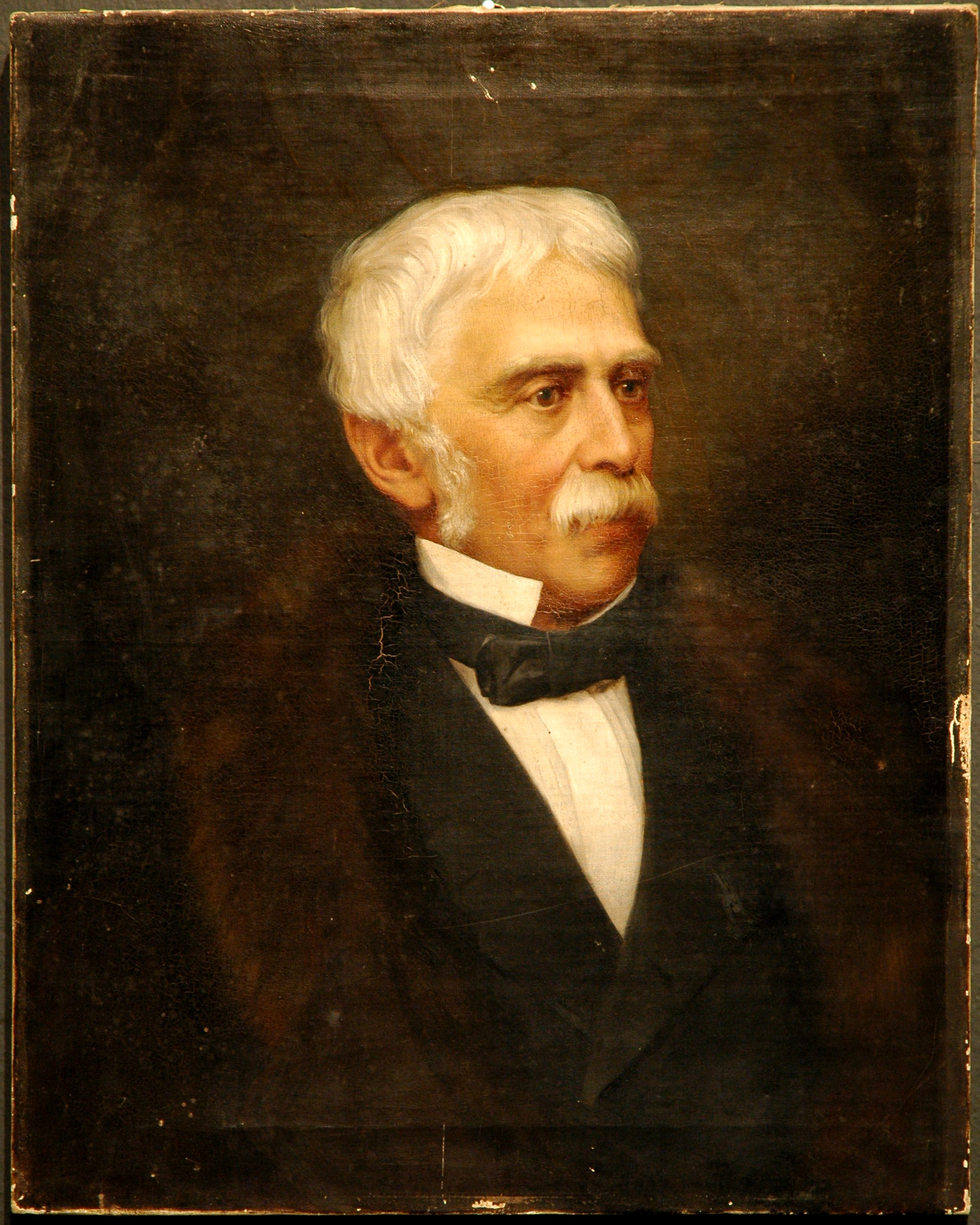
Anton von Prokesch-Osten

In 1849, Prince Felix of Schwarzenberg named Anton von Prokesch ambassador in Berlin (1849–1852), with the mission to restore the influence of Austria in Germany, weakened after the revolutions of 1848. On the way to Berlin, he believed it was possible to restore the understanding that prevailed between the Austria and Prussia and allowed both states to dominate the German Confederation after 1815. However, he quickly realized that King Frederick William IV and his favorite minister, Joseph von Radowitz, considering the creation of a German Empire for the benefit of Prussia. Prokesch was ready to facilitate a limited expansion Prussia in northern Germany, but he understood that he could not reconcile the Prussian ambitions with the interests of Austria and other states of Germany. Isolated, often leaving Vienna without instructions, he turned to Metternich. Faced with the indifference of Schwarzenberg, who was preoccupied with other issues, Prokesch and his Austrian colleagues had established an informal network to exchange information and coordinate their actions. Since his exile in Brussels, where he remained since the revolution of 1848, Metternich had readily agreed to advise his former subordinates, he could influence the development of an Austrian influence on German Affairs. The full restoration of the Confederate regime must be credited much to Prokesch efforts, but his vigorous defense of the traditional role of Austria in Germany made him unpopular in Berlin. In 1853, he was recalled and sent to Frankfurt, as the representative of Austria at the Federal Diet. Appointed to chair this meeting, he had two years to bear the intrigues and tactics of obstruction of his Prussian colleague Otto von Bismarck.

During the Crimean War, he unsuccessfully proposed the mobilization of the army against the Russian, as Bismarck knew how to prevent it. It was there that in 1854, he befriended Joseph Arthur de Gobineau.

In 1855, he was appointed ambassador to the Sublime Porte, where he remained for sixteen years. At his departure in 1871, Emperor Francis Joseph I granted him the hereditary title of Count in recognition of sixty years of distinguished service. He was a member of the Academy of Sciences of Berlin and Vienna and had a large collection of coins which was purchased in 1875 by the museum in Berlin.

Prokesch died on 26 October 1876 in Vienna. The architect Theophil von Hansen is the author of the mausoleum built over his grave in the cemetery of St. Leonhard, Graz.

== Selected works ==
- About the campaign 1814 (German: Über den Feldzug 1814), Vienna 1823
- Memories from Egypt and Asia Minor (German: Erinnerungen aus Ägypten und Kleinasien), Vienna 1829–1831, 3 volumes
- The land between the cataracts of the Nile (German: Das Land zwischen den Katarakten of Nils), Vienna 1831st
- Travel to the Holy Land (German: Reise ins Heilige Land), Vienna 1831st
- Memorabilia and memories from the Orient, Stuttgart 1836–1837, 3 vols.
- History of the Secession of the Greeks from the Turkish empire in 1821(German: Geschichte des Abfall der Griechen vom türkischen Reich im Jahre 1821), Stuttgart 1867, 6 volumes.
- Mehmed Ali, viceroy of Egypt, out of my diary 1826–1841 (German: Mehmed Ali, Vizekönig von Ägypten, aus meinem Tagebuch 1826-1841), Stuttgart the 1877th
- Juvenile literature (German: Kleine Schriften), Stuttgart 1842–1844, 7 volumes.
- My relations with the Duke of Reichstadt (German: Mein Verhältniß zum Herzog von Reichstadt), Paris, 1872.

== See also ==
- Internationalization of the Danube River
