= Clémence Gabrielle Monnerot =

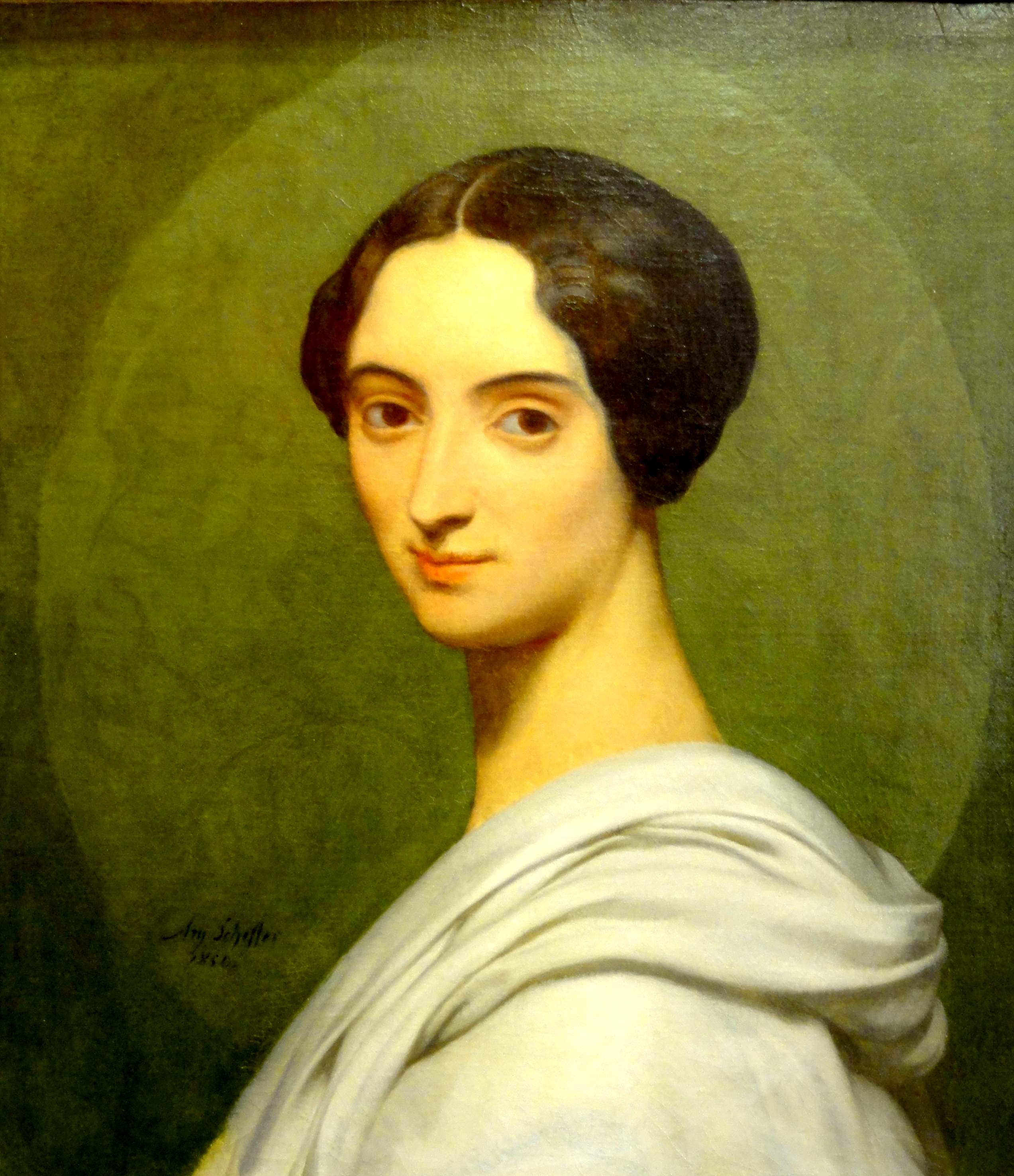
- Portrait of the Countess of Gobineau, by Ary Scheffer (1850)
- Born: 20 August 1816; Fort-de-France, Martinique
- Died: 4 January 1911 (aged 94); Paris, France
- Citizenship: France
- Spouse: Arthur de Gobineau
- Children: Christine de Gobineau; Diane de Guldencrone
- Parents: Jean François Clément Monnerot (father); Luce Marie Victoire Destourell (mother)

Clémence Gabrielle Monnerot (20 August 1816 – 4 January 1911) was a creole born in Martinique and was the spouse of French aristocrat Arthur de Gobineau, who was best known for helping to legitimise racism by the use of scientific racist theory and "racial demography", and for developing the theory of the Aryan master race.

== Marriage ==
On 10 September 1846, Clémence married Arthur de Gobineau. She had pressed for a hasty marriage as she was pregnant by their mutual friend Pierre de Serre who had abandoned her. As a practicing Catholic, she did not wish to give birth to an illegitimate child. As with his mother, Gobineau was never entirely certain about her origins, and hence whether his two daughters had black ancestors or not, as it was a common practice for French slave masters in the Caribbean to take a slave mistress.
