= Frederick William Thomas (philologist) =

English philologist

- Born: 21 March 1867; Tamworth, Staffordshire
- Died: 6 May 1956 (aged 89); Cambridge
- Education: Trinity College, Cambridge
- Scientific career
- Fields: Philology, Oriental languages
- Workplaces: University College, London, Balliol College, Oxford

Frederick William Thomas CIE FBA (21 March 1867 – 6 May 1956), usually cited as F. W. Thomas, was an English Indologist and Tibetologist.

== Life ==
Thomas was born on 21 March 1867 in Tamworth, Staffordshire. After schooling at King Edward's School, Birmingham, he went up to Trinity College, Cambridge in 1885, graduating with a first class degree in both classics and Indian languages and being awarded a Browne medal in both 1888 and 1889. At Cambridge he studied Sanskrit under the influential Orientalist Edward Byles Cowell.

He was a librarian at the India Office Library (now subsumed into the British Library) between 1898 and 1927. Simultaneously he was lecturer in comparative philology at University College, London from 1908 to 1935, Reader in Tibetan at London University from 1909 to 1937 and the Boden Professor of Sanskrit at Oxford University between 1927 and 1937, in which capacity he became a fellow of Balliol College. His students at Oxford included Harold Walter Bailey.

Thomas became a Fellow of the British Academy in 1927. He died on 6 May 1956.

== Work ==
Thomas collaborated with Jacques Bacot in publishing a collection of Old Tibetan historical texts. In addition he studied many Old Tibetan texts himself which were collected in his four-volume Tibetan literary texts and documents concerning Chinese Turkestan and Ancient folk-literature from North-Eastern Tibet. He also published a monograph on the Nam language, and wrote an unpublished work on the Zhangzhung language.

His catalogues of the Tibetan manuscripts from Central Asia brought to the India Office Library by Marc Aurel Stein remained unpublished until 2007, when his catalogue of Tibetan manuscripts from Stein's third expedition was published on the website of the International Dunhuang Project.

== Publications ==
- (1897) (with E.B. Cowell) The Harsa-carita of Bana. London: Royal Asiatic Society.
- (1903) Catalogue of Sanskrit MSS.
- (1929) (with Sten Konow) Two medieval documents from Tun-Huang. Oslo, A.W. Brøggers boktrykkeri.
- (1933) Arthur Anthony Macdonell, 1854-1930. London: Milford.
- (1935-1963) Tibetan literary texts and documents concerning Chinese Turkestan. [4 vols.] London: Royal Asiatic Society.
- (1940-1946) (with Jacques Bacot and Gustave-Charles Toussaint) Documents de Touen-houang relatifs à l'histoire du Tibet. Paris: Librairie orientaliste Paul Geuthner.
- (1948) Nam, an ancient language of the Sino-Tibetan borderland. London, Oxford Univ. Press.
- (1957) Ancient folk-literature from North-Eastern Tibet. Berlin: Akademie-Verlag.
- (2007) Stein Tibetan: Third Expedition http://idp.bl.uk/database/oo_cat.a4d?shortref=Thomas_2007
