= Nam language =

Extinct Sino-Tibetan language

Nam
- Region: Central Asia
- Extinct: (date missing)
- Language family: Sino-Tibetan: (unclassified); Nam

Language codes
- ISO 639-3: None (mis)
- Glottolog: namm1235

Nam is an unclassified extinct language preserved in Tibetan transcriptions in a number of Dunhuang manuscript fragments. The manuscript fragments are held at the British Library and the Bibliothèque nationale de France.

== Classification ==
According to Ikeda Takumi, the research of F. W. Thomas, published in 1948, concluded that Nam "was one of the old Qiang [languages] spoken around the Nam mountain range near Koko nor in Qinghai province", associated with a country called Nam tig which is mentioned in some historical records. However, Ikeda further states that Thomas' conclusions were widely criticized.

Glottolog accepts that it was at least Sino-Tibetan.

== Lexicon ==
Wen (1981: 18–19) lists the following basic vocabulary items, which have been taken from Thomas (1948: 399–451).

No.	Chinese gloss	English gloss	Nam
1	天	sky	mo, nam
2	云	cloud	gmog, mog, mog
3	日	sun	gnyi
4	月	moon	’la, la
5	火	fire	sme/’me, ’me’i, me, ’mye, ye
6	水	water	’ldya, ’ldya
7	山	mountain	’ri, gri, gri’i, ’ri’i
8	石	stone	’rto, rto
9	虎	tiger	cho
10	熊	bear (animal)	gre
11	牦牛	yak	’brong
12	马	horse	rta, rta’, ’rta, ’rta’
13	驴	donkey	gzu, ’ju, ’zu, ’dzu, ’ju’u’gduz
14	狗	dog	’kyi
15	猪	pig	’phag
16	头	head	’bu, ’ko
17	眼	eye	’me’i, méi, mye
18	齿	tooth	swa
19	手	hand	’phyag
20	心	heart	syning, snyang
21	盲	blind	klu
22	死	dead	’shi, shi (gshi, bshi)
23	箭	arrow	’da’, ’lda’?
24	门	door	rgo, ’go, ’ko(rgor)
25	大	big	rbo, bo-bon, rbom, ’bom, ’rbom
26	小	small	byi, hbyi
27	高	high	shid, ’shid, tho, ’tho, stang, ’stang
