= Société Asiatique =

Learned society in France

The Société Asiatique (French pronunciation: [sɔsjete azjatik], lit. 'Asiatic Society') is a French learned society dedicated to the study of Asia. It was founded in 1822 with the mission of developing and diffusing knowledge of Asia. Its boundaries of geographic interest are broad, ranging from the Maghreb to the Far East. The society publishes the Journal asiatique. At present the society has about 700 members in France and abroad; its library contains over 90,000 volumes.

== History ==
The establishment of the society was confirmed by royal ordinance on April 15, 1829. Antoine-Isaac Silvestre de Sacy was the first president.

== Notable people ==
- Jean-Pierre Abel-Rémusat
- Jacques Bacot
- Jean Berlie
- Eugène Burnouf
- Jean-François Champollion
- Henri Cordier
- Jean-Baptiste Benoît Eyriès
- Julius Klaproth
- Louis Finot
- Jean Leclant
- Sylvain Lévi
- Abdallah Marrash
- Gaston Maspero
- Paul Pelliot
- Joseph Toussaint Reinaud
- Ernest Renan
- Antoine-Jean Saint-Martin
- Antoine-Isaac Silvestre de Sacy
- İbrahim Şinasi
- Charles Virolleaud

== List of the presidents of the Société ==
- 1822–1829: Antoine-Isaac Silvestre de Sacy
- 1829–1832: Jean-Pierre Abel Rémusat
- 1832–1834: Antoine-Isaac Silvestre de Sacy
- 1834–1847: Amédée Jaubert
- 1847–1867: Joseph Toussaint Reinaud
- 1867–1876: Julius von Mohl
- 1876–1878: Joseph Héliodore Garcin de Tassy
- 1878–1884: Adolphe Régnier
- 1884–1892: Ernest Renan
- 1892–1908: Barbier de Meynard
- 1908–1928: Émile Senart
- 1928–1935: Sylvain Lévi
- 1935–1945: Paul Pelliot
- 1946–1951: Jacques Bacot
- 1952–1964: Charles Virolleaud
- 1964–1969: George Coedès
- 1969–1974: René Labat
- 1974–1986: Claude Cahen
- 1987–1996: André Caquot
- 1996–2002: Daniel Gimaret
- 2002–present: Jean-Pierre Mahé
