= Journal asiatique =

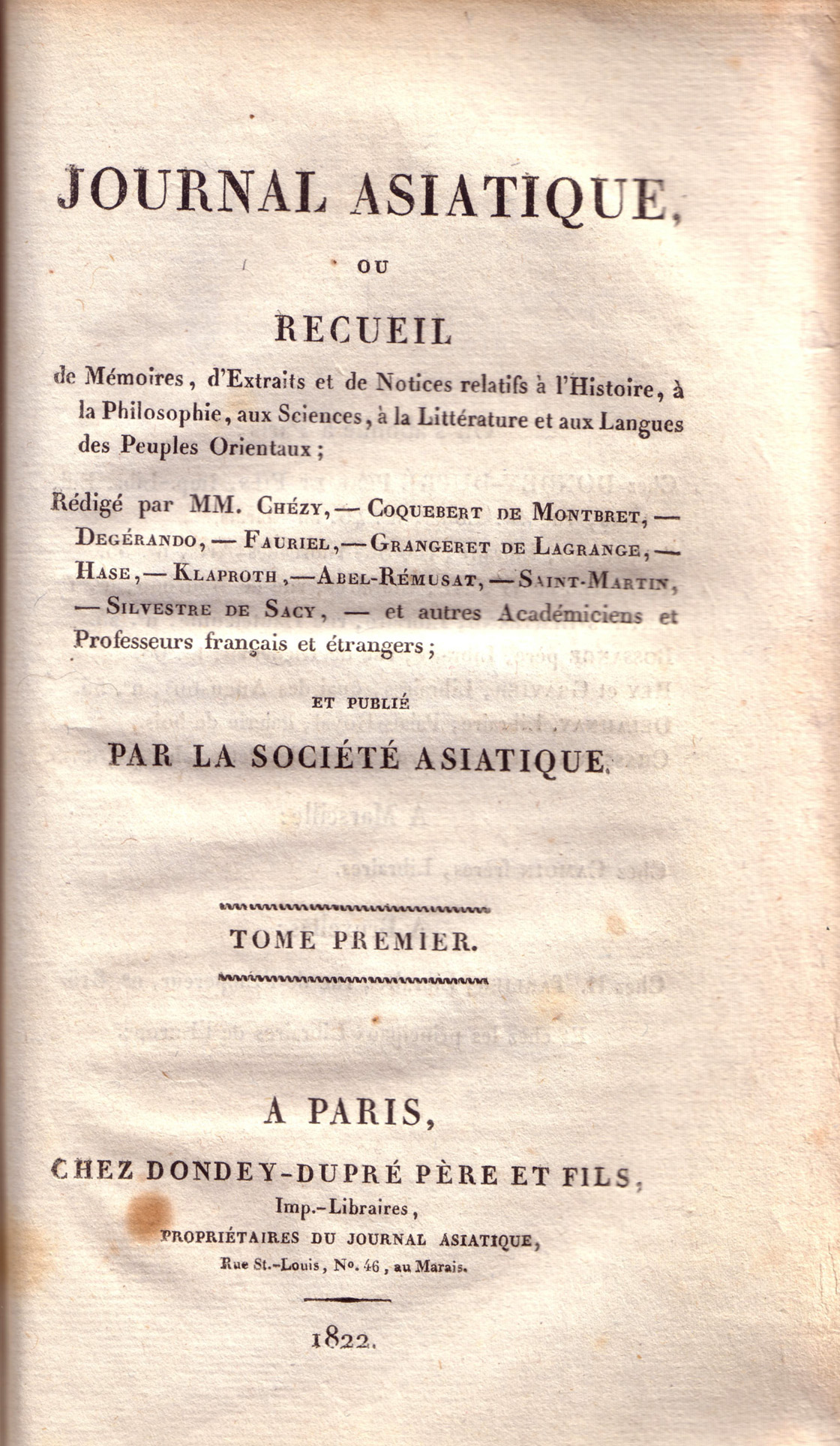
- Cover of first issue (1822)
- Discipline: Asian studies
- Language: English, French, German, Italian, Spanish
- Edited by: Jean-Marie Durand

Publication details
- History: 1822–present
- Publisher: Peeters Publishers on behalf of the Société Asiatique
- Frequency: Biannual

Standard abbreviations
- ISO 4: J. Asiat.

Indexing
- ISSN: 0021-762X (print); 1783-1504 (web)
- LCCN: sc82008193
- OCLC no.: 714198965

Links
- Journal homepage; Online access

The Journal asiatique (French pronunciation: [ʒuʁnal azjatik]; full earlier title Journal Asiatique ou Recueil de Mémoires, d'Extraits et de Notices relatifs à l'Histoire, à la Philosophie, aux Langues et à la Littérature des Peuples Orientaux) is a biannual peer-reviewed academic journal established in 1822 by the Société Asiatique covering Asian studies. It publishes articles in French and several other European languages. Cited texts are presented in their original languages. Each issue also includes news of the Société Asiatique and its members, obituaries of notable Orientalists, critical reviews, and books received. The journal is published by Peeters Publishers on behalf of the Société Asiatique and the editor-in-chief is Jean-Marie Durand.

It is one of the oldest continuous French publications.

== Abstracting and indexing ==
The journal is abstracted and indexed in: Bibliographie linguistique/Linguistic Bibliography, ATLA Religion Database, Index to the Study of Religions Online, Index Islamicus, and Scopus.

== Previous editors ==
The following people have been editor-in-chief:

- Antoine-Jean Saint-Martin (1822–1832)
- Grangeret de Lagrange (1832–1858)
- Julius von Mohl (1858–1876)
- Barbier de Meynard (1876–1892)
- Rubens Duval (1892–1908)
- Louis Finot (1908–1920)
- Gabriel Ferrand (1920–1935)
- René Grousset (1935–1946)
- Jean Sauvaget (1946–1950)
- Marcelle Lalou (1950–1967)
- James Germain Février (1967–1972)
- Daniel Gimaret (1972–1992)
- Denis Matringe (1993–2001)
- Cristina Scherrer-Schaub (2001–2008)
- Gérard Colas (2008–2011)
