= Jacques Bacot =

French Tibetologist (1877–1965)

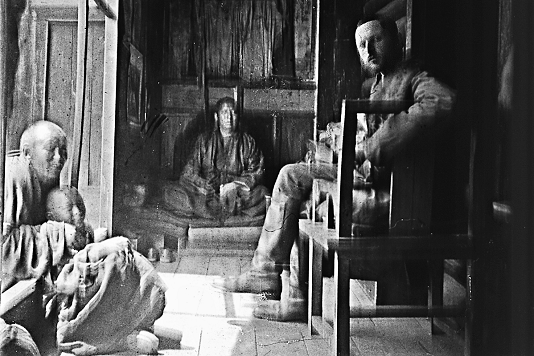
Bacot (right) with Tibetan monks in Kham, September 1909

Jacques Bacot (4 July 1877 – 18 June 1965) was an explorer and pioneering French Tibetologist. He travelled extensively in India, western China, and the Tibetan border regions. He worked at the École pratique des hautes études. Bacot was the first western scholar to study the Tibetan grammatical tradition, and along with F. W. Thomas (1867–1956) belonged to the first generation of scholars to study the Old Tibetan Dunhuang manuscripts. Bacot made frequent use of Tibetan informants. He acquired aid from Gendün Chöphel in studying Dunhuang manuscripts.

== Biography ==
The Tibetological career of Jacques Bacot began from a round the world trip which he made in 1904 and from an expedition to Tibet in 1906, starting from Tonkin, in the course of which he followed a pilgrimage route which must have put him in intimate contact with the religious life of Tibet. After his return to France in 1908, he devoted himself to the study of Tibetan with Sylvain Lévi.

Jacques Bacot explored various Asian countries:

- The valley of the Yangtze River (1907);
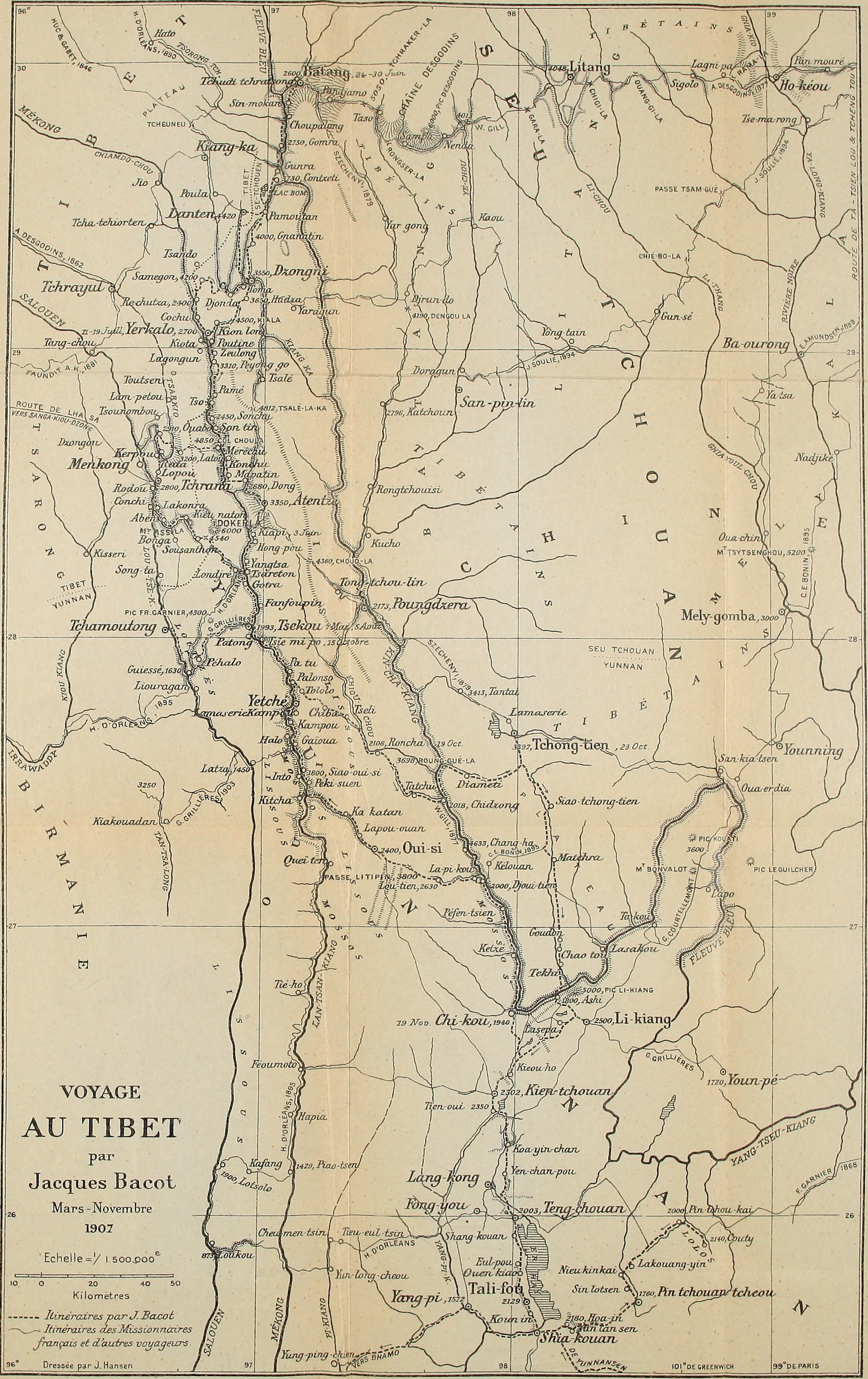
- In the Steps of the Tibetans around Dokerla (November 1906-January 1908) (1909)
  The north of Indochina (1909–1910);
- The Himalayas (1913–1914 and 1930–1931)

and travelled extensively in India, in the east of China, and the border regions of Tibet.

Jacques Bacot was named director of studies (directeur d'études) of Tibetan at l'École pratique des hautes études in 1936. He became a member of l'Académie des inscriptions et belles-lettres in 1947, and entered the Société Asiatique in 1908. He became president after the death of Paul Pelliot, in 1945, and remained so until 1954.

The paintings and bronzes which he acquired in his various expeditions are now held at the Guimet Museum in Paris, which he donated to in 1912. His library and papers were also donated to the museum after his death.

== Works ==
- 1913 Les Mo-so. Ethnographie des Mo-so, leurs religions, leur langue et leur écriture. Leiden: E.J. Brill, 1913.
- 1921 Trois mystères tibétains : Tehrimekundan-Djroazanmo-Nansal, traduits avec introduction, notes, et. Paris: Éditions Bossard.
- 1924 Kunstgewerbe in Tibet. Berlin: E. Wasmuth.
- 1925 Le poète tibétain Milarépa, ses crimes, ses épreuves, son Nirvāna. (Classiques de l’Orient 11 ) Paris: Éditions Bossard.
- 1928 Une grammaire tibétaine du tibétain classique. Les ślokas grammaticaux de Thonmi Sambhoṭa, avec leurs commentaires. (Annales du Musée Guimet. Bibliothèque d’études 37) Paris: P. Geuthner.
- 1940 Documents de Touen-Houang relatifs à l’histoire du Tibet. (Annales du Musée Guimet 51). Paris: P. Geuthner.
- 1946. Grammaire du tibétain littéraire. Paris: Librairie d’Amérique et d’Orient.
- 1947 Le Bouddha. (Mythes et religions 20 ) Paris: Presses universitaires de France.
- 1948 Grammaire du tibétain littéraire. Index morphologique. Paris: Librairie d’Amérique et d’Orient.
- 1951 Tibet: bannières et miniatures. Paris: Le musée.
- 1956 “Reconnaissance en haute Asie septentrionale par cinq envoyés ouigours au VIIIe siècle.” Journal Asiatique 2 :137-153.
- 1957 Zugiñima. Paris: Impr. Nationale.
- 1990 Three Tibetan mysteries : as performed in the Tibetan monasteries (trans. by H.I. Woolf). Taipei : SMC.
