= Chamberlen =

Chamberlen is a surname of English origin. Notable people with the surname include:

- Hugh Chamberlen (c.1632 – after 1720), English physician, son of Peter Chamberlen the third
- Hugh Chamberlen the younger (1664–1728), English physician, son of Hugh Chamberlen the elder
- Peter Chamberlen the elder (c.1560–1631), French barber-surgeon in England
- Peter Chamberlen the younger (1572–1626), English surgeon, brother of Peter Chamberlen the elder
- Peter Chamberlen the third (1601–1683), English physician, son of Peter Chamberlen the younger

== See also ==
- Chamberlain (surname)
- Chamberlaine
- Chamberlayne (surname)
- Chamberlin (surname)
