= Chamberlain (surname) =

Chamberlain is an English surname. In English, it means an attendant for a sovereign or lord in his bedchamber, or a chief officer in the household of a king or nobleman.

== List of people ==
Notable people with this surname include:

- Abiram Chamberlain (1837–1911), American politician
- Alec Chamberlain (born 1964), English football player
- Azaria Chamberlain (1980) Australian baby killed by dingo
- Alexander Francis Chamberlain (1865–1914), Canadian anthropologist
- Alex Oxlade-Chamberlain (born 1993), English football player
- Allison Chamberlain, American epidemiologist
- Ardwight Chamberlain (born 1957), American voice actor and screenwriter
- Austen Chamberlain (1863–1937), British politician, Nobel Peace Prize winner, son of Joseph Chamberlain
- Basil Hall Chamberlain (1850–1935), British academic and poet
- Beatrice Chamberlain (1862–1918), British educationalist and political organizer
- Betsey Guppy Chamberlain (c. 1797–1886), Native American textile mill worker and writer
- Brenda Chamberlain (born 1952), Canadian politician
- Brenda Chamberlain (1912–1971), Welsh artist and poet
- Boeta Chamberlain (born 1999), South African rugby union player
- Byron Chamberlain (born 1971), American football player
- Calvin T. Chamberlain (1795–1878), American politician
- Charles E. Chamberlain (1917–2002), American politician
- Charles Joseph Chamberlain (1863–1943), American botanist
- Charles R. Chamberlain (born 1969), American political leader
- Chris Chamberlain (born 1985), American football player
- Corinna Chamberlain, as also as Chan Ming-yan, Hong Kong singer and actress
- Craig Chamberlain (born 1957), American baseball player
- Crawford Chamberlain (1821–1902), British Indian Army general
- Cyril Chamberlain (1909–1974), British actor
- Daniel Henry Chamberlain (1835–1907), American politician
- Daniel R. Chamberlain, American academic administrator
- David Chamberlain (born 1975), American cross-country skier
- Dean Chamberlain, American photographer
- Douglas Chamberlain (1931–2025), British cardiologist
- Edward Chamberlain (disambiguation), multiple people
- Emma Chamberlain (born 2001), American YouTuber
- Erwin Chamberlain (1915–1986), Canadian ice hockey player
- Fanny Chamberlain (1825–1905), American wife of Joshua Chamberlain and First Lady of Maine
- Francis Chamberlain (disambiguation), several people
- Frank Chamberlain (1925–2004), English cricketer
- Frank O. Chamberlain (1829–1902), American farmer, hotel manager, and politician
- Geoffrey Chamberlain (1930–2014), British obstetrician, gynaecologist, and professor
- George Chamberlain (disambiguation), several people
- Helen Chamberlain (born 1967), British television host
- Henry Chamberlain (disambiguation), several people
- Hilda Chamberlain (1872–1967), British political organizer and activist
- Houston Stewart Chamberlain (1855–1927), British-German racialist philosopher
- Howland Chamberlain (1911–1984), American actor
- Ice Box Chamberlain (1867–1929), American baseball player
- Isaac Chamberlain (born 1994), English boxer
- Jack Chamberlain (1884–1953), Australian politician
- Jack Chamberlain (1884–1941), Australian sportsman
- Jay Chamberlain (1925–2001), American race car driver
- Jeremiah Chamberlain (1794–1851), American minister, educator and college administrator
- Jerry Chamberlain (born 1952), American singer, songwriter, guitarist, and producer
- Joba Chamberlain (born 1985), American baseball player
- John Chamberlain (1553–1628), English writer
- John Angus Chamberlain (1927–2011), American sculptor
- John Curtis Chamberlain (1772–1834), American politician
- John Henry Chamberlain (1831–1883), English architect
- John Loomis Chamberlain (1858–1948), American army officer
- John Marvin Chamberlain (1844–1928), English composer
- John Rensselaer Chamberlain (1903–1995), American journalist and editor
- Joseph Chamberlain (1836–1914), British politician
- Joshua Chamberlain (1828–1914), American Union Army general and Medal of Honor recipient
- Kenneth Chamberlain Sr. (died 2011), African American man shot by police
- Lauren Chamberlain (born 1993), American softball player
- Lindy Chamberlain (born 1948) and Michael Chamberlain (1944–2017), whose infant daughter Azaria disappeared in the Dingo Baby case
- Maia Chamberlain (born 1998), American fencer
- Mariam Chamberlain (1918–2013), American activist
- Marise Chamberlain (1935–2024), New Zealand middle-distance runner
- Mark Chamberlain (born 1961), English footballer
- Mark Chamberlain (born 1999), English professional boxer
- Mary Chamberlain (born 1947), British novelist and historian
- Martin Chamberlain (born 1973), British judge
- Matt Chamberlain (born 1967), American drummer
- M. E. Chamberlain (1932–2022), British historian
- Mellen Chamberlain (1821–1900), American lawyer, historian and librarian
- Montague Chamberlain (1844–1924), Canadian-American naturalist, founder of the American Ornithologists' Union
- Nathan Henry Chamberlain (1830–1901), American clergyman
- Neville Chamberlain (1869–1940), British Prime Minister from 1937 to 1940
- Neville Bowles Chamberlain (1820–1902), British senior Indian Army officer
- Neville Francis Fitzgerald Chamberlain (1856–1944), British Army officer and Inspector-General of the Royal Irish Constabulary
- Neville Patrick Chamberlain (born 1960), English footballer
- Neville Chamberlain (1939–2018), British Anglican bishop
- Nira Chamberlain (born 1969), British mathematician
- Noel Chamberlain (1900–1975), Bishop of Trinidad and Tobago from 1956 until 1961
- Oscar Chamberlain (born 2005), Australian cyclist
- Owen Chamberlain (1920–2006), American physicist
- Paul A. Chamberlain (fl. 2010s–2020s), American Army major general
- Rebecca Chamberlain (born 1970), American painter
- Richard Chamberlain (1934–2025), American actor and singer
- Richard Chamberlain (1840–1899), British politician
- Robert Chamberlain (1607–1660), English poet and playwright
- Robert N. Chamberlain (1856–1917), American lawyer and politician in
- Robert H. Chamberlain (1838–1910), American law enforcement officer, machinist, military officer, and sheriff
- Ronald Chamberlain (1901–1987), British lecturer and politician
- Samuel Chamberlain (1829–1908), American soldier, painter and artist
- Samuel Selwyn Chamberlain (1851–1916), American journalist
- Siobhan Chamberlain (born 1983), English football player
- Spencer Chamberlain (born 1983), American vocalist
- Thomas Chamberlain (disambiguation), several people
- Thomas Crowder Chamberlain (1843–1928), American geologist
- Tom Chamberlain (born 1996), English footballer
- Tom Chamberlain (born 2002), English footballer
- Tom Chamberlain (born 1987), New Zealand rugby union player
- Tosh Chamberlain (1934–2021), English footballer
- Vicente Cuadra Chamberlain (1919–2000), Nicaraguan advertising executive
- Warren D. Chamberlain (1927–2013), American politician
- William Chamberlain (disambiguation), several people
  - William Charles Chamberlain (1818–1878), British Rear Admiral
  - William H. Chamberlain (1931–1972), American politician
- Wilt Chamberlain (1936–1999), American basketball player
- Wynn Chamberlain (1927–2014), American artist, film maker and author

== See also ==
- Chamberlayne (disambiguation)
- Chamberlin (disambiguation)
- Chamberlaine
