= John Chamberlain =

John Chamberlain may refer to:

== Politicians ==
- John Chamberlain (14th-century MP) for Arundel (UK Parliament constituency)
- John Chamberlain (died 1617), MP for Clitheroe
- John Curtis Chamberlain (1772–1834), US politician

== Others ==
- John Chamberlain (sculptor) (1927–2011), American sculptor
- John Chamberlain (journalist) (1903–1995), American journalist and editor
- John Chamberlain (letter writer) (1553–1628), English letter writer
- John Henry Chamberlain (1831–1883), English architect
- John Loomis Chamberlain (1858–1948), American army officer, recipient of the Distinguished Service Medal
- John M. Chamberlain (1844–1928), English composer

== See also ==
- Jack Chamberlain (disambiguation)
- Chamberlain (surname)
- John Chamberlaine (1745–1812), English antiquary and keeper
- John Chamberlayne (1666–1723), English writer and translator
- John Chamberlin (1837–1896), American chef and restaurateur
