= Peter Chamberlen =

Peter Chamberlen may refer to:

- Peter Chamberlen the elder (c. 1560–1631), French-English surgeon and man-midwife
- Peter Chamberlen the younger (1572–1626), English surgeon, brother of Peter Chamberlen the elder
- Peter Chamberlen the third (1601–1683), English physician, son of Peter Chamberlen the younger

== See also ==
- Peter Chamberlin (1919–1978), English architect
