= Chamberlaine =

Chamberlaine is a surname. Notable people with the surname include:

- John Chamberlaine (1745–1812), antiquary and acted as keeper of George III's drawings, coins and medals from 1791 until his death in 1812
- Nicholas Chamberlaine (1632–1715), priest in the Church of England known for his charitable donations
- Nicholas Chamberlaine Technology College, state secondary school with technology college status in the town of Bedworth, Warwickshire, England

== See also ==
- Chamberlain (disambiguation)
- Chamberlin (disambiguation)
- Chamberlayne (disambiguation)
- Chamberlen
