= W. H. Chamberlin =

W. H. Chamberlin or W. H. Chamberlain may refer to:

- William Henry Chamberlin (1897–1969), American historian and journalist
- William Henry Chamberlin (philosopher) (1870–1921), American Mormon philosopher and theologian
- William H. Chamberlain (1931–1972), American politician from Illinois

== See also ==
- Chamberlin (surname)
- Chamberlain (surname)
