= Chamberlain =

Chamberlain may refer to:

== Profession ==
- Chamberlain (office), the officer in charge of managing the household of a sovereign or other noble figure

== People ==
- Chamberlain (surname)
  - Austen Chamberlain (1863–1937), British politician
  - Houston Stewart Chamberlain (1855–1927), German-British philosopher and racialist writer
  - Joshua Chamberlain (1828–1914), Brigadier General of American Civil War and Governor of Maine
  - Neville Chamberlain (1869–1940), British Prime Minister at the outbreak of World War II
  - Joseph Chamberlain (1836–1914), British statesman and father of Austen and Neville Chamberlain
  - Wilt Chamberlain (1936–1999), American basketball player

== Places ==
- Chamberlains, Newfoundland and Labrador, Canada
- Chamberlain, Ontario, Canada
- Chamberlain, Saskatchewan, Canada
- Chamberlain Township, Brule County, South Dakota, a township
  - Chamberlain, South Dakota, United States, a city
- Chamberlain, Uruguay
- Chamberlain Basin, Custer County, Idaho
- Chamberlain Square in Birmingham, England
- D.S. Chamberlain Building, listed on the National Register of Historic Places in Polk County, Iowa
- West Chester (Des Moines, Iowa), Known as the Chamberlain Mansion, listed on the National Register of Historic Places in Polk County, Iowa

== Arts, entertainment, and media ==
- Chamberlain (band), an American indie rock band from Indiana, active since 1996
- Lord Chamberlain's Men, William Shakespeare's playing company

== Law ==
- Chamberlain v. Skylink
- Chamberlain v. Surrey School District No. 36
- Chamberlain v. The Queen (No.2), see: Death of Azaria Chamberlain
- Chamberlain Hrdlicka, law firm

== Other uses ==
- Chamberlain Engineering, a former auto racing team
- Chamberlain Group, a manufacturer of garage door openers
- Chamberlain, or Chamberlain John Deere, a brand of agricultural tractor and the company that made them
- Operation Chamberlain, an American military operation during the 2003 Invasion of Iraq

== See also ==
- Chamberlayne (disambiguation)
- Chamberlin (disambiguation)
