= Chamberlin (surname) =

Other names
- Variant forms: Chamberlain, Chamberlayne

Chamberlin is a surname. Notable people with the surname include:

- Ann Chamberlin, (born 1954) American novelist
- Beth Chamberlin (born 1963), American television actress
- Clarence Chamberlin (1893–1976), American aviator
- Donald D. Chamberlin (born 1944), American computer scientist, co-designer of the SQL database language
- Edson Joseph Chamberlin (1852–1924), American president of the Grand Trunk Railway
- Edward Chamberlin (1899–1967), American economist
- Frank Chamberlin (1978–2013), American football player
- G. Richard Chamberlin (born 1946), American politician from Georgia
- George Harris Chamberlin (1827–1921), American politician from Wisconsin
- Guy Chamberlin (1894–1967), American football player
- Harry Chamberlin (1887–1944), Olympic equestrian and US Army brigadier general
- Harry Chamberlin, inventor of the Chamberlin musical keyboard instrument
- Henry Chamberlin (died 1888), member of the New Zealand Legislative Council
- Jan Rooney née Chamberlin, singer and widow of Mickey Rooney
- Jim Chamberlin (1915–1981), Canadian aerodynamicist who worked on the Canadian Avro Arrow, NASA's Gemini spacecraft and the Apollo program
- Jimmy Chamberlin (born 1964), American drummer of The Smashing Pumpkins
- Joseph Conrad Chamberlin (1898–1962), American arachnologist
- Kevin Chamberlin (born 1963), American actor
- Lee Chamberlin (1938–2014), American actress
- Lisa Jo Chamberlin (born 1972), American convicted murderer
- Mason Chamberlin (1727–1787), English portrait painter
- Michael Chamberlin (disambiguation)
- Paul Chamberlin (born 1962), American tennis player
- Ralph Vary Chamberlin (1879–1967), American biologist and historian
- Shaun Chamberlin, English author and activist
- Thomas Chrowder Chamberlin (1843–1928), American geologist
- Willard Joseph Chamberlin (1890–1971), American entomologist and World War I pilot
- William Henry Chamberlin (1897–1969), American historian and journalist
- William Henry Chamberlin (philosopher) (1870–1921), Mormon philosopher and theologian

== See also ==
- Chamberlin (disambiguation)
