= Hester Shaw =

Hester Shaw may refer to:

- Hester Shaw (character), protagonist of the Mortal Engine Quartet novel series
- Hester Shaw (midwife) (c. 1580 – 1660), English midwife and pamphleteer
