= Chamberlin (disambiguation) =

Chamberlin is an electro-mechanical musical keyboard instrument.

Chamberlin may also refer to:

- Chamberlin (surname)
- The Chamberlin, a retirement community and historic hotel in Hampton, Virginia, formerly known as the Chamberlin Hotel
- Chamberlin (band), American folk rock band
- Chamberlin, Texas, United States
- Chamberlin (lunar crater)
- Chamberlin (Martian crater)
- Chamberlin Observatory
- Chamberlin trimetric projection
- Chamberlin-Johnson-DuBose Company
- Chamberlin Springs, United States

== See also ==
- Chamberlain (disambiguation)
- Chamberlayne (disambiguation)
