= Frank Chamberlain =

Frank Chamberlain may refer to:

- Frank Noel Chamberlain (1900–1975), Bishop of Trinidad and Tobago
- Frank Chamberlain (cricketer) (1925–2004), chairman of the Test and County Cricket Board in the 1990s
- Frank O. Chamberlain (1829–1902), American farmer, hotel manager, and politician

== See also ==
- Francis Chamberlain (disambiguation)
