= Percivall Willughby =

English physician and obstetrician

Percivall Willughby (1596 – 1685) was an English physician and writer on obstetrics.

== Life ==
Percivall Willughby was sixth son of Sir Percivall Willughby, of Wollaton Hall, Nottinghamshire, where he was born in 1596. Francis Willughby was his nephew. Percivall was educated at Trowbridge, Rugby, Eton, and Oxford, where he matriculated from Magdalen College on 23 March 1620–1, his age being given as twenty-two, and graduated BA on 6 July 1621.

In 1619 he was, at the suggestion of his uncle Robert Willughby, himself a medical man, articled for seven years to Feamer van Otten, after which he was to have joined his uncle; but Van Otten dying in 1624, Willughby soon after commenced practice for himself, and in 1631 he settled in Derby, where he married Elizabeth, daughter of Sir Francis Coke of Trusley, by whom he had two or three sons and two daughters.

On 20 February 1640–1 he was admitted an extra licentiate of the Royal College of Physicians. In 1655 he removed to London "for the better education of his children", but in 1660 he returned to Derby, where he resumed his practice as a physician, enjoying a high reputation throughout the neighbouring counties for his skill in obstetric operations. He deprecated the use of the crotchet, and, Chamberlen's secret of the forceps not having been as yet divulged, he endeavoured to overcome all difficulties by turning. At one period he was to some extent assisted by a daughter, whom he had trained as a midwife to ladies of the higher classes. He was a man of high culture, powerful intellect, and great modesty, scorning the secrecy which some of his contemporaries maintained as to their procedures; and though he committed to writing the conclusions at which he arrived after long years of study and observation, revising and transcribing the manuscripts in English and in Latin, he seems to have hesitated to the last at their publication, as if sensible of the want of some really scientific instrument (the forceps) for the perfection of his art. The earliest copy of his work is a closely written quarto, entitled Dni Willougbaei, Derbiensis, De Puerperio Tractatus, in the British Library Sloane MS. 529. The second, an amplification of this, and referred to by Dr. Denman in his Practice of Midwifery, was then in the possession of his friend Dr. Kirkland; while the third and greatly enlarged edition consisted of two exquisitely written copies in Latin and in English, which were afterwards the property of Dr. J. H. Aveling, the English version being in two parts, with the titles Observations in Midwifery and The Countrey Midwife's Opusculum or Vade-mecum, by Percivall Willughby, Gentleman. It was privately printed in 1863 by Henry Blenkinsopp, but a Dutch translation had been printed as an octavo at Leyden in 1764, though no copy is now to be had in Holland. He was the intimate friend of Harvey and of most of the scientific men of the century, and died on 2 October 1685, in the ninetieth year of his age, being buried in St Peter's Church, Derby, where within the rails of the chancel is a tablet to his memory.

== Bibliography ==
- Dunn, Peter M. (1997). "Dr Percivall Willughby, MD (1596–1685): pioneer "man" midwife of Derby". Archives of Disease in Childhood: Fetal and Neonatal Edition 76(3): 212–213.
- Willoughby, Edward Francis (1900). "Willughby, Percivall" . In Lee, Sidney (ed.). Dictionary of National Biography. Vol. 62. London: Smith, Elder & Co. p. 57.
