= Dittrichin Siegmundin =

German obstetrician

Dittrichin Siegmundin (1648 – 1705) was a German obstetrician named as a possible re-inventor of nooses and blunt hooks for turning or extracting an infant in difficult births. She was the first, along with Francois Mauricaeu, to apply the technique of puncturing the amniotic sac to arrest hemorrhaging in placenta praevia. During this time, she studied the correct amount of use of these tools and wrote about the importance of not overusing or abusing these tools and procedures. She studied the instruments and procedures of obstetrics from books and practice alongside peasant women for nearly 12 years. In 1689 her first book was published, and reprinted six times, for midwives reflecting on all of the notes and illustrations she kept with each delivery in her practice. She eventually became the midwife to the Court of the Elector of Brandenburg in the royal family of Prussia and one of the most celebrated of the German midwives of the 17th century.
