= Edward Chamberlain =

Edward Chamberlain may refer to:

== Politicians ==
- Edward Chamberlain (died 1557), MP for Heytesbury, Buckingham and Mitchell
- Edward Chamberlain (1480–1543), MP for Wallingford
- Edward Chamberlain (1503–1557), MP for Nottingham

== Others ==
- Edward Blanchard Chamberlain, botanist and bryologist
- Edward Chamberlin (1899–1967), American economist
- Edward Chamberlayne (1616–1703), English writer
- Ted Chamberlain (Edward Edinborough Chamberlain, 1906–1993), New Zealand plant pathologist
- Ed Chamberlain, Irish rugby league player
