= Test and County Cricket Board XI =

The Test and County Cricket Board XI was a cricket team formed by the Test and County Cricket Board which was made up of players English county players who were considered to be on the fringes of selection for the England cricket team. The team played four first-class matches, with the first being a three-wicket defeat at Trent Bridge in 1981 against the touring Sri Lankans. The team's second match came in 1986 against the touring New Zealanders, with the match ending in a draw. The team next appeared in first-class cricket nine years later against a Young Australia team, which the tourists won by nine wickets. The TCCB XI's fourth and final first-class match came the following year against a touring South Africa A side, which resulted in their only victory. Of the 41 players to represent the team, none scored a century, however both James Kirtley and Robert Croft took five wicket hauls, with Kirtley's 5 wickets for 51 against South Africa A the best figures. Both Kirtley and Croft gained subsequent full England international honours, making four and 21 Test match appearances respectively.
