= Test and County Cricket Board =

British sport governing body (1968–1996)

The Test and County Cricket Board (TCCB) was the governing body for Test and county cricket in Great Britain between 1968 and 1996. The TCCB was established in 1968 to replace the functions of the Board of Control for Test Matches (established in 1898) and the Advisory County Cricket Committee (1904) which had been set up by the Marylebone Cricket Club (MCC) to administer Test cricket in England and the County Championship respectively. In order to be eligible for government funding through the Sports Council, cricket needed an independent governing body and the representatives from the TCCB, together with representatives from MCC and the National Cricket Association (NCA), formed a new Cricket Council, initially known as the MCC Council. The TCCB assumed responsibility for all county cricket and the England team at home and abroad, although England touring teams continued under the name MCC until the 1976–77 season.

In 1992 Scotland severed their ties with the TCCB and England. The TCCB, NCA and Cricket Council were in turn superseded from 1 January 1997 by the England and Wales Cricket Board.

== Officers ==
Chairmen

- Cecil Paris 1968–1969
- Maurice Allom 1969–1970
- Cyril Hawker 1970–1971
- Cecil Paris 1971–1972
- Aidan Crawley 1972–1973
- Cecil Paris 1973–1975
- Doug Insole 1975–1978
- George Mann 1978–1983
- Charles Palmer 1983–1985
- Raman Subba Row 1985–1990
- Frank Chamberlain 1990–1994
- Dennis Silk 1994–1996

Secretaries

- Billy Griffith 1968–1974
- Donald Carr 1974–1986

Chief executives

- A C Smith 1987–1996
- Tim Lamb 1996–1997

== Representative teams ==
A TCCB XI (in one case restricted to cricketers under 25) played five first-class matches between 1981 and 1996, all in England against touring sides. One was won, two drawn and two lost. The bulk of the TCCB side tended to be made up of English county players who were on the fringes of the England team proper.
