= Henry Chamberlain =

Henry Chamberlain may refer to:

- Sir Henry Chamberlain, 1st Baronet (1773–1829), British diplomat
- Sir Henry Chamberlain, 2nd Baronet (1796–1843), British Army officer and artist
  - For subsequent Chamberlain baronets, see Chamberlain baronets
- Henry Chamberlain (Michigan politician) (1824–1907), Michigan politician
- Henry Chamberlin (1825–1888), New Zealand politician often spelled Chamberlain
- Henry Chamberlain, a character on the TV series The Secret Circle
- Boeta Chamberlain (Henry Chamberlain, born 1999), South African rugby union player

== See also ==
- Chamberlain (surname)
