= Test and County Cricket Board Under-25s XI cricket team =

English team in 1990

A Test and County Cricket Board Under-25s XI was a cricket team formed by the Test and County Cricket Board which was made up of players under 25 years of age. (Note: Richard Illingworth was at the time of the match aged 26 years and 357 days) The players were considered to be on the fringes of selection for the England cricket team. The team played one match which was rated as first-class against the touring Indians in August 1990. Of the eleven that started the match, only John Stephenson and Nasser Hussain had played Test cricket prior to this match. The team included future Test cricketers Martin Bicknell, Richard Blakey, Richard Illingworth, Tim Munton, and Graham Thorpe. The remainder of the team consisting of Paul Johnson, Stuart Lampitt, Keith Medlycott and Nadeem Shahid would never play at international level. Of the Test cricketers, Hussain would be the most successful, making 96 Test appearances and captaining England in 45 Tests. The teams only first-class match against the Indians ended in a draw, with Indian batsman Sanjay Manjrekar and Navjot Sidhu both scoring centuries, a feat also achieved by the Under-25s XI captain John Stephenson.
