= Jack Chamberlain =

Jack Chamberlain may refer to:

- Jack Chamberlain (politician) (1884–1953), Australian politician in Tasmania
- Jack Chamberlain (sportsman) (1884–1941), Australian rules footballer and cricketer
- Jack Chamberlain (tennis), British tennis player who competed at Wimbledon in 1929, 1930 and 1935

== See also ==
- John Chamberlain (disambiguation)
