= James Cranford =

James Cranford (c.1592–1657) was an English presbyterian clergyman. He was active as a licenser of theological publications during the 1640s, and belonged to the heresy-hunting wing of the London presbyterians, writing a preface to the Gangraena of Thomas Edwards.

== Life ==
He was the son of James Cranford, master of Coventry free school, and was born there in 1592. He entered Balliol College, Oxford, in 1617, and received a B.A. 17 October 1621, and M.A. 20 June 1624. He took holy orders, became rector of Brockhall, Northamptonshire, and on 16 January 1643 rector of St. Christopher, London.

Under the Commonwealth he was a licenser for the press, and prefixed many epistles to the books which he allowed to go to the press. The licensing process was part of a broader power struggle; Cranford became a target for the Independents who disliked his palpable bias, and was singled out by Henry Robinson in developing his arguments for religious tolerance, for skewing the debate. The widening discussion drew in William Fiennes, 1st Viscount Saye and Sele, whom Cranford maligned, and who said that Cranford was beholden to the Scots such as Robert Baillie, and Robert Devereux, 3rd Earl of Essex. Cranford controversially licensed works by David Buchanan. In 1649 the presbyterians played their hand to the utmost against the army, and in March of that year Cranford was removed from his post.

Early in 1652 he held two disputations at the house of William Webb in Bartholomew Lane, with Peter Chamberlen the third, on the questions: '1. Whether or no a private person may preach without ordination? 2. Whether or no the presbyterian ministers be not the true ministers of the gospel?' Cranford argued in the negative on the first question, and in the affirmative on the second. A full report of the debate was published 8 June 1652. He died 27 April 1657, and was buried in the church of St. Christopher. A son, James Cranford, was also in holy orders and succeeded his father in the living of St. Christopher, but died in August 1660.

== Works ==
Cranford wrote:

- Confutation of the Anabaptists, London, n. d.
- 'Expositions on the Prophecies of Daniel, London, 1644.
- Haereseomachia, or the Mischief which Heresies do, London, 1646, a sermon preached before the lord mayor 1 February 1646, to which a reply was issued in broadsheet form, under the title of The Clearing of Master Cranford's Text (8 May 1646).

Cranford also contributed a preface to the Tears of Ireland, 1642, the whole of which is usually attributed to him. It is an exaggerated account of the cruelties inflicted on the Protestants in Ireland in the Irish Rebellion of 1641, with vivid engravings. Prefatory epistles by Cranford appear in Richard Stock's Stock of Divine Knowledge (addressed to Lady Anne Yelverton), London, 1641; in Thomas Edwards's Gangraena, pt. i. and pt. ii. London, 1646; Christopher Love's The Soul's Cordiall, 1652; and in Benjamin Woodbridge's Sermons on Justification, 1652. In 1653 the last contribution was severely criticised by William Eyre in his Vindiciae Justificationis Gratuitae, in which Cranford's doctrine of conditional justification by faith is condemned.
