= Michael Chamberlin =

Michael Chamberlin may refer to:

- Michael Chamberlin (biologist) (1937–2025), American biologist
- Michael Chamberlin (comedian) (born 1977), Australian comedian
- Michael Chamberlin, president of The Advertising Club of New York, 1981–1982

== See also ==
- Michael Chamberlain (1944–2017), Australian politician
