= Ann Chamberlin =

American writer of historical novels

- Chamberlin at CONduit 17 in Salt Lake City, Utah.
- Born: March 28, 1954 (age 72)
- Occupation: Writer
- Writing career
- Genre: Historical fiction

Ann Chamberlin is an American writer of historical novels. Her website states that the "purpose of storytelling . . . is to support positions in exact opposition to the views prevailing in a culture's powerhouses, whatever those views happen to be." This belief has led her to provide a feminist perspective on Middle Eastern affairs.

== Biography ==
Chamberlin began writing stories as a child.

Her interest in Islamic culture began when she worked on an archeology dig in Israel where she helped work on an ancient Ottoman settlement.

Later in the trip she met the matriarch of an Islamic family "who, in spite of her hidden features, seemed to radiate a power and command a respect much greater than one might expect of a Muslim woman."

The trip led to her obtaining a BS in anthropology from the University of Utah, focusing on Middle Eastern culture.

== Works ==
=== Ottoman Empire Trilogy ===
The trilogy began with Sofia (1996), whose title character is kidnapped sold into the great harem of the Sultan of the Ottoman Empire. In Chamberlin's vision of harems, women used their seclusion for self-management, and only internal strife led to their domination under the sultans. The other two novels in the series were The Sultan's Daughter (1997) and The Reign of the Favored Women (1998).

The Turkish author Solmaz Kâmuran discovered the trilogy and offered to translate the books into Turkish. The books were released in Turkey in March 2000 and two weeks later they topped the country's bestseller list. Her tour of the country later that year was covered by Turkish television and enthusiastically received by the populace.

=== Joan of Arc Tapestries ===
These books deal with similar themes with stories placed in medieval Europe. The books deal in part with prophecies of Joan of Arc made by Merlin and also suggest that Joan may have been a practitioner of pagan religions. There are four books in the series, including The Merlin of St. Gilles' Well (1999), The Merlin of the Oak Wood (2001) and Gloria.

=== Other fiction ===
Chamberlin's three books retelling Biblical times are The Virgin and the Tower, Leaving Eden, and Tamar. Tamar was rereleased as Snakesleeper in 2007.

Leaving Eden (2000) is told from the perspective of "Adam's daughter, Na'amah, by his first wife Lilith". Over the course of the novel, Adam rejects the old ways of the goddess and forges a new masculine religion represented by an enormous aurochs.

=== Nonfiction ===
A History of Women's Seclusion in the Middle East : the veil in the looking glass (2006) "offers an interdisciplinary examination of how women throughout the Middle East are and have been secluded, exploring both ideas of oppression and why it may be less oppressive than outsiders think. The historical review of such actions allows readers to consider cultural influences involved in women's isolation."
