= George Chamberlain =

George Chamberlain may refer to:

== People ==
- George Chamberlain (bishop) (1576–1634), Roman Catholic bishop of Ypres
- George Chamberlain (MP), member of parliament for Woodstock
- George C. Chamberlain (1837–1896), Minnesota state representative
- George E. Chamberlain (1854–1928), American politician who served as governor and United States Senator from Oregon
- George Henry Chamberlain (1862–1943), American politician and lawyer from Ohio
- George Agnew Chamberlain (1879–1966), American novelist and diplomat
- George Philip Chamberlain (1905–1995), RAF air vice marshal
- George Richard Chamberlain, American actor and singer

== Other ==
- SS George Chamberlain, a World War II US Navy Liberty ship
- George D. Chamberlain High School, Tampa, Florida, US

== See also ==
- George Chamberlin (1846–1928), Norfolk businessman
