= Edith Chamberlayne =

British composer (1869–1918)

Edith Amelia Chamberlayne (October 1869 – September 1918) was an English composer active during the 19th century.

== Life and work ==
Edith Chamberlayne studied at the Royal College of Music with H. C. Banister and a "Professor Prout". Little is known about her life and career, other than that she composed two symphonies, an opera, several overtures, and a variety of chamber works, and that her Scherzo was performed in February 1895 at The Crystal Palace. She appeared in Arthur Elson's discussion of English composers in his Women's Work in Music, as well as a 1909 article in The Etude.

Scholars have speculated that she is the anonymous "E.A.C." who wrote a letter to The Musical World in 1890 advocating for women composers:

It is impossible to find a single woman’s name worthy to take rank with Beethoven, Handel, Mozart, Rossini, Brahms, Wagner, Schubert; we cannot even find one to place beside Balfe or Sir Arthur Sullivan ... If we seek for what may be called the feminine element in music, we have to look for it among the works of men, for the simple reason that women have produced nothing that can be given serious consideration.

Her music, specifically three short pieces for violin and piano, was described by contemporaries as "notable for tenderness and simplicity".

== Selected works ==
=== Orchestra ===
- Symphony No. 1
- Symphony No. 2
- Overtures

=== Chamber ===
- Scherzo for harp, flute, and strings
- Two Sonatas for Pianoforte, Op. 16
- Organ pieces
- Piano Suite

=== Opera ===
- Unknown opera

=== Songs ===
- "Be Strong, O Heart!" Text by Adelaide Procter
