= West Chester (Chamberlain Mansion, Des Moines, Iowa) =

Des Moines, Iowa historic house

- U.S. National Register of Historic Places
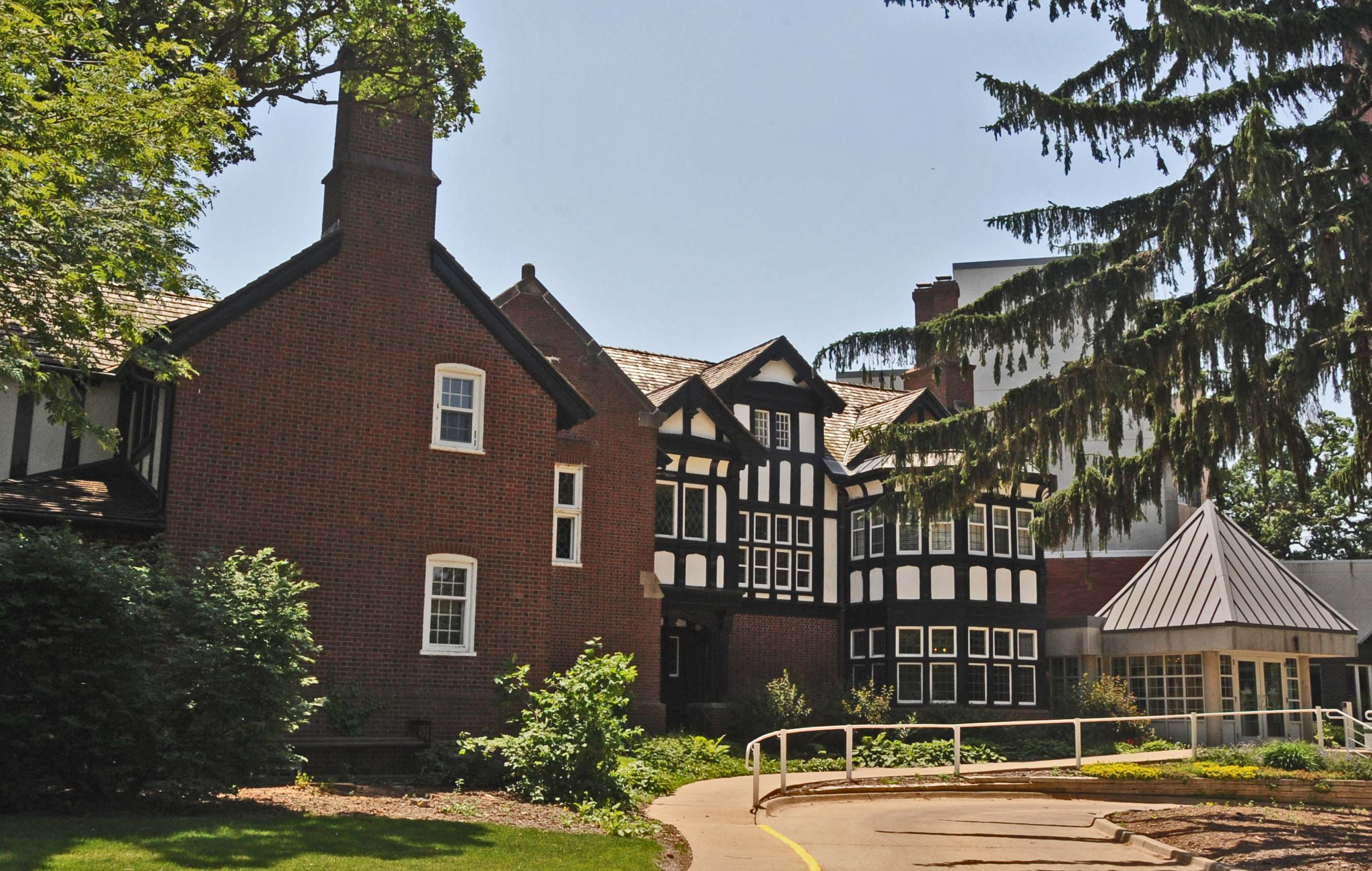

- Location within Iowa Location within the United States
- Location: 3520 Grand Ave. Des Moines, Iowa
- Coordinates: 41°35′0.8″N 93°39′52.4″W
- Area: 1.3 acres (0.53 ha)
- Built: 1901–1903
- Architect: William George Rantoul
- NRHP reference No.: 84001304
- Added to NRHP: January 19, 1984

Chamberlain House, also known as the West Chester and Wesley on Grand, is a historic building located in Des Moines, Iowa, United States. Designed by Boston architect William George Rantoul, it is considered an excellent example of Jacobethan Revival architecture in the city. It was featured in a couple of publications after its completion. The inspiration for the house's design were the half timbered homes in Chester, England. It features five gables and dormers on the main facade that rise above the ridged roofline and three tall chimneys with separate shafts for each flue. There are two gabled wings on the south elevation of the house. The second floor has six bed & breakfast rooms.

== Original owner ==
David S. Chamberlain's brother Lowell Chamberlain moved his patent medicine business to Des Moines in 1881, and it grew to become one of the five largest pharmaceutical and toiletry manufacturing firms in the United States. Chamberlain lived in a farmhouse on the property when this house was built from 1901 to 1903. Chamberlain built the D.S. Chamberlain Building in downtown Des Moines, Iowa as a speculative venture in 1917. Chamberlain also built the Chamberlain Hotel located at 7th and Locust Streets in downtown Des Moines. The hotel was built on the former site of Plymouth Church, Des Moines, Iowa. The hotel occupied the south side of the site of the current Ruan Center. According to a divorce settlement reported in the Iowa Bystander, "The Chamberlain hotel, recently erected at a cost of $300,000 becomes the property of Mrs. Chamberlain upon the payment of her of about $2500."

== Later occupants ==
In 1947, five retired Methodist Clergy couples moved into the home and the South Iowa Methodist Conference established Wesley Acres, Inc. as a faith inspired, not-for-profit, mission to serve older adults. The front yard, drive and the house are what remain of the estate. The rest is taken up by newer construction including the Wesley Life campus. The house is currently used as a pub and a bed and breakfast. The house was listed on the National Register of Historic Places in 1984.
