= Peter Chamberlen the elder =

Peter Chamberlen the elder (c.1560–1631) was a French barber-surgeon who grew up in England and worked in London. With an interest in obstetrics, he was unusual for the time for his role as an accoucher or "man-midwife"; and came into conflict with the established College of Physicians of London.

== Life ==
Chamberlen became surgeon to Queen Anne of Denmark, wife of James I and accoucheur to Queen Henrietta Maria, Charles I's queen. Admitted to the College of Barber-Surgeons in 1598, he came into serious conflict with the College for prescribing medicines contrary to their rules. In 1612 he was committed to Newgate prison for this offence and only released after the intercession of the Lord Mayor of London and the Archbishop of Canterbury. He was appointed surgeon to Queen Anne in 1614 and was present at the birth of Charles II in 1630.

== Family ==
Chamberlen's wife, Anne Harris, whom he married in London in 1584, predeceased him, as did his son David (1590–1618) who died in the East Indies while serving as a ship's surgeon on the Royal James. His daughter Esther married Thomas Cargill, an Aberdeen merchant; she and her children are all named in his will but as Chamberlen's younger son, William (1598 -) is not mentioned, it most likely he too predeceased his father.

== See also ==
- Peter Chamberlen the younger, his younger brother.
