= Chamberlayne =

Chamberlayne may refer to:

- Chamberlayne (surname)
- Chamberlayne, Virginia, United States
- Chamberlayne Elementary School, Henrico County, Virginia, U.S.A.
- Chamberlayne Junior College, Newton, Massachusetts

== See also ==
- Chamberlain (disambiguation)
- Chamberlin (disambiguation)
