= François Mauriceau =

French obstetrician (1637 - 1709)

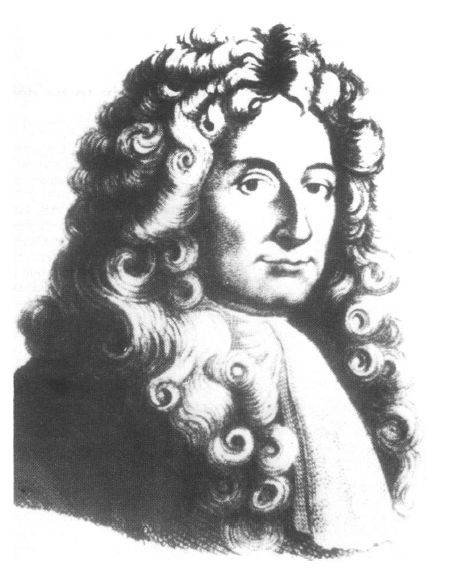
Portrait of François Mauriceau

François Mauriceau (1637 – 17 October 1709) was a French obstetrician.

== Life ==
Born in Paris, he received his training in obstetrics at the Hôtel-Dieu. He was a leading obstetrician in 17th-century Europe — in 1668 he published, Traité des Maladies des Femmes Grosses et Accouchées, a book that helped establish obstetrics as a science. It was eventually translated into several languages. He is also known for development of a classical manoeuvre of assisted breech delivery (Mauriceau-Levret manipulation). He gave a description of tubal pregnancy, and with German midwife Justine Siegemundin 1650–1705), he is credited for introducing the practice of puncturing the amniotic sac to arrest bleeding in placenta praevia.

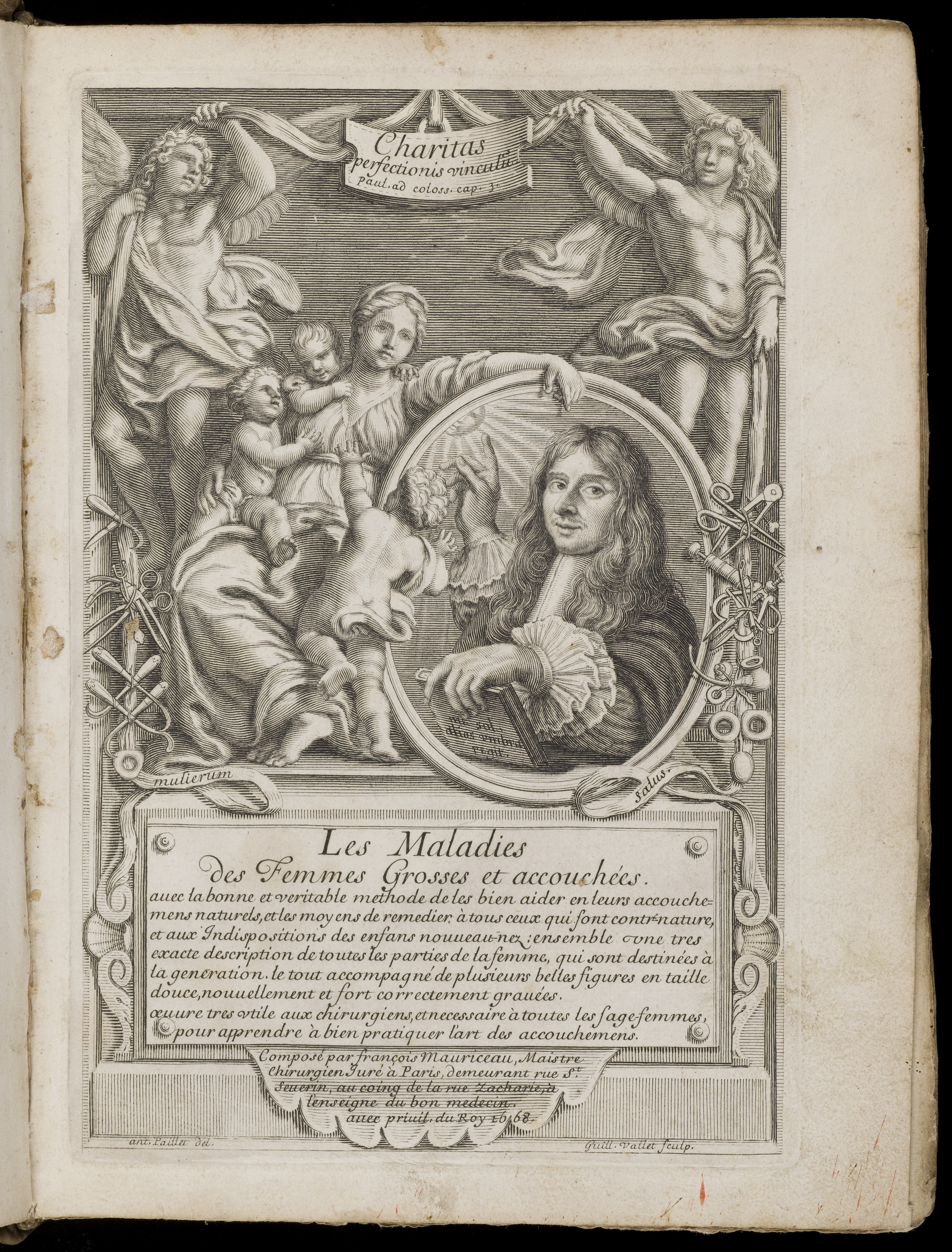
Les Maladies des Femmes Grosses et accouchées

In 1670, English obstetrician Hugh Chamberlen tried to sell the secret of a specialized obstetrical forceps to him. Mauriceau became disgusted that the Chamberlen family kept such an important development a secret, and accused the Chamberlens of common swindling. Mauriceau died in Paris.

== Publications ==
- Les Maladies des Femmes Grosses et accouchées. Avec la bonne et véritable Méthode de les bien aider en leurs accouchemens naturels, & les moyens de remédier à tous ceux qui sont contre-nature, & aux indispositions des enfans nouveau-nés... Paris Henault, d'Houry, de Ninville, Coignard 1668.
- Observations sur la grossesse et l'accouchement des femmes et sur leurs maladies et celles des enfans nouveau-nez. Paris, Anisson, 1694.
