= John Chamberlin =

American chef and restaurateur

John F. Chamberlin (c. 1837 – August 23, 1896) was a renowned American chef and restaurateur in the last quarter of the 19th century.

== Biography ==
"Chamberlin's" restaurant in Washington, D.C., located on the southeast corner of 15th and I streets NW, was considered one of the best and most expensive in the city. His lead chef Emeline Jones, an emancipated slave, was considered among the best chefs of her day. The restaurant was part of Chamberlin's hotel, which took up three houses previously owned by Fernando Wood, Thomas Swann, and James G. Blaine.

In April 1896 Chamberlin opened the "Hotel Chamberlin" on Old Point Comfort in Hampton, Virginia. It was a popular resort for the wealthy until it burned down in 1920. A new Hotel Chamberlin opened in 1928, but was unable to capture the same level of glory as its predecessor; it remains in operation today as both a retirement community and hotel called "The Chamberlin".

Chamberlin was born in Lansingburgh, New York (now part of Troy), and lived in New York City where he engaged in a number of businesses, and then moved in the 1870s to Washington. He opened "Chamberlin's" in 1880.

Chamberlin died in Saratoga Springs, New York, in 1896, but his Washington restaurant remained in operation under 1906.
