= Francis Chamberlain =

Francis Chamberlain or Chamberlayne may refer to:

- Francis Chamberlain (Australian politician), (1900–1984), Australian politician
- Francis Chamberlain (governor), governor of Guernsey
- Francis Chamberlayne, MP for New Shoreham

== See also ==
- Frances Chamberlain, First Lady of Maine
- Frances Chamberlaine, playwright
- Frank Chamberlain (disambiguation)
