= Edward Blanchard Chamberlain =

American botanist

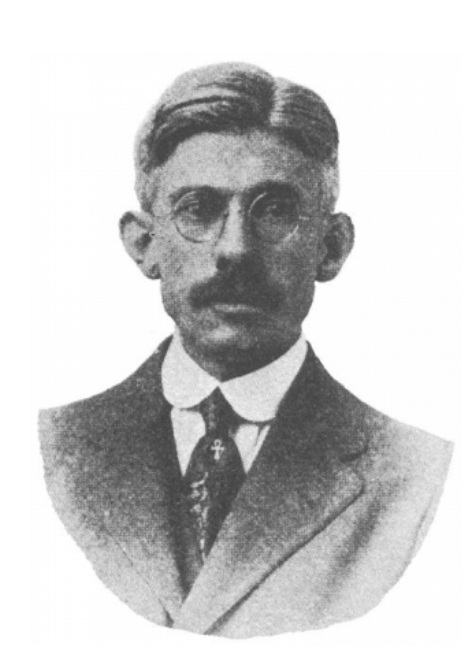
- Edward Blanchard Chamberlain, 1915
- Born: July 24, 1878; Bristol, Maine
- Died: February 2, 1925 (aged 46); New York City
- Education: Bowdoin College; Brown University
- Scientific career
- Fields: Botany
- Workplaces: Sachs Collegiate Institute
- Academic advisors: James Franklin Collins
- Author abbrev. (botany): E.B.Chamb.

Edward Blanchard Chamberlain (July 24, 1878 – February 2, 1925) was a botanist and bryologist that specialized in the flora of Maine. He served as president of the Sullivant Moss Society from 1905 to 1907.
