= The Chamberlin =

Historic hotel in Virginia, United States

- Chamberlin Hotel
- U.S. National Register of Historic Places
- U.S. National Historic Landmark District – Contributing property
- Virginia Landmarks Register
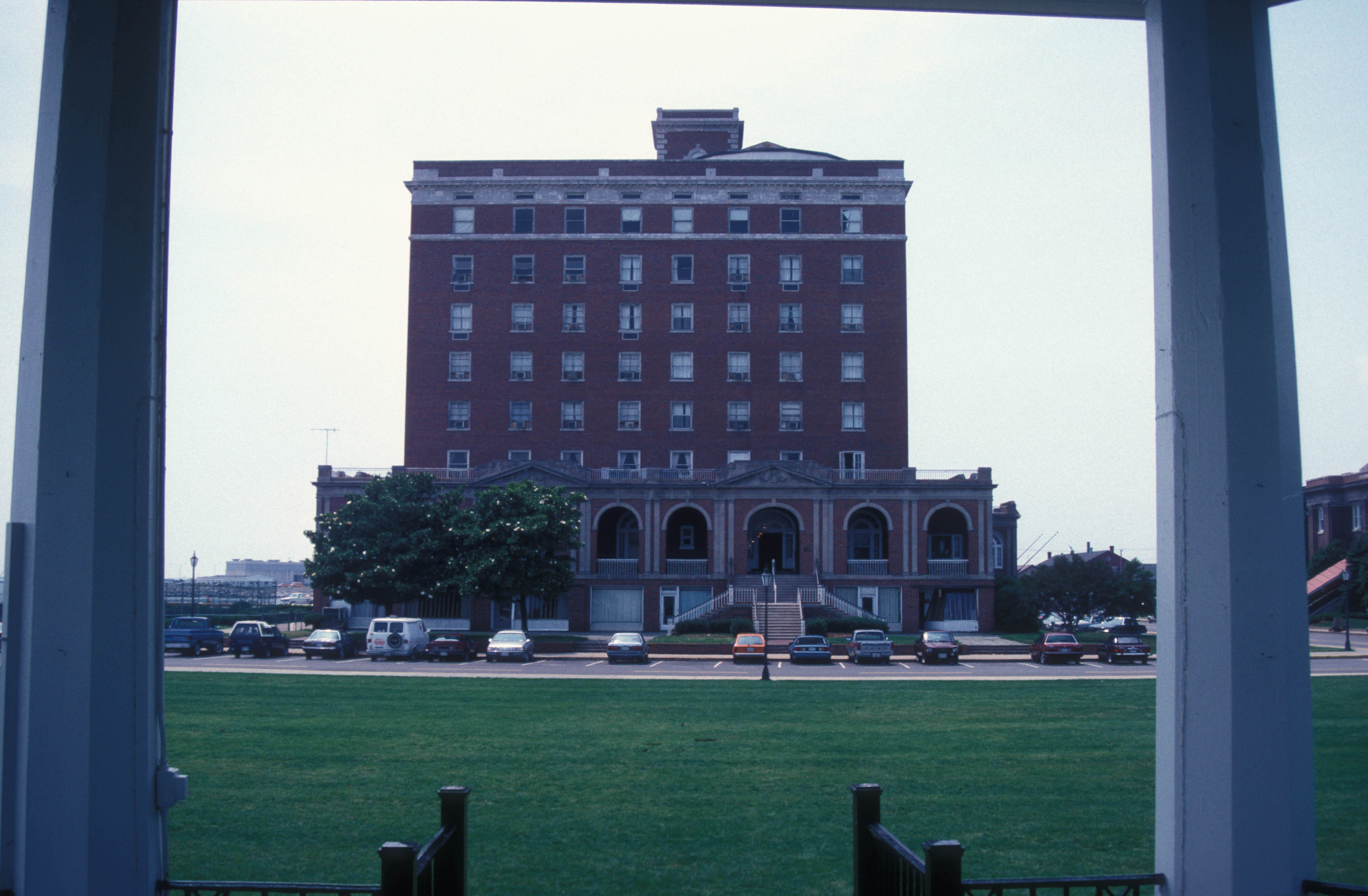

- Location within Virginia Location within the United States
- Location: 2 Fenwick Rd., Fort Monroe, Hampton, Virginia
- Coordinates: 37°0′3.9″N 76°18′44.6″W
- Area: 5 acres (2.0 ha)
- Built: 1928
- Architect: Wright, Marcellus E., Sr; Warren & Wetmore
- Architectural style: Beaux Arts
- Part of: Fort Monroe Historic District (ID66000912)
- NRHP reference No.: 07000190
- VLR No.: 114-0114

Significant dates
- Added to NRHP: March 21, 2007
- Designated NHLDCP: October 15, 1966
- Designated VLR: December 6, 2006

The Chamberlin is a retirement community in Hampton, Virginia, overlooking Hampton Roads at Old Point Comfort. It was formerly known as the Chamberlin Hotel, named for the famed restaurateur and original owner John Chamberlin. The nine-story building sits on historic Fort Monroe and overlooks Fort Wool. Listed on the National Register of Historic Places, it has been renovated from its former life as a hotel into a luxury retirement community for people aged 55 and up.

The second floor has retained the hotel atmosphere while the rest of the floors have been renovated and turned into one- and two-bedroom apartments. A few apartments are used as guest quarters for visiting relatives of residents.

The current building opened in 1928 as the Chamberlin-Vanderbilt Hotel, under the direction of Marcellus E. Wright Sr., with Warren and Wetmore consulting. It replaced an earlier Chamberlin Hotel, designed by Washington, D.C., architects John L. Smithmeyer and Paul J. Pelz and completed in 1896, which had in turn replaced the Hygeia. The current building originally had two large cupolas on its roof but these were removed during World War II because they were visible from out in the ocean beyond the Virginia Capes and it was feared that they could potentially aid a hostile German warship cruising offshore in targeting Fort Monroe. They were never replaced after the war.
