= Nathan Henry Chamberlain =

Nathan Henry Chamberlain (25 December 1830, Bourne, Massachusetts - 1 April 1901) was a United States clergyman, first a Unitarian, and later an Episcopalian. (Note: He also has a biography in the Dictionary of American Biography, where his birthdate is listed as 28 December 1828(?).)

== Biography ==
He graduated from Harvard in 1853, and studied theology at the divinity school there, and at Heidelberg, Germany, eventually becoming a Unitarian minister. He was pastor at Canton, Massachusetts, 1857–59, and at Baltimore, Maryland, 1860-63. He then took orders in the Episcopal Church, and became rector at Birmingham, Connecticut, 1864–67; Morrisania, New York, 1868–71; Milwaukee, Wisconsin, 1871–73; Somerville, Massachusetts, 1874–79; East Boston, Massachusetts, 1882-89. He then retired to devote himself to literary pursuits.

== Writings ==
- Autobiography of a New England Parish (1864)
- The Sphinx in Aubrey Parish (1889)
- What is the Matter with our Tariff and its Taxes (1890)
- Samuel Sewall and the World He Lived In, a study of colonial life in New England (1897)
- Life of Sir Charles Napier
- An Itinerary of Cape Cod
