= Hugh Chamberlen the younger =

Hugh Chamberlen the younger (1664–1728) was a fashionable English physician in London.

== Life ==
The eldest son of Hugh Chamberlen the elder, he was educated at Trinity College, Cambridge, and took the degree of Master of Arts (MA) in 1683 per literas regias. After studying medicine at the University of Leyden he graduated M.D. at Cambridge in 1689. In 1694 he was admitted a fellow of the Royal College of Physicians, and was censor in 1707, 1719, 1721.

Chamberlen practised midwifery like his forebears, and had many fashionable patients. He dined with Jonathan Swift, and attended Francis Atterbury in the Tower of London. His own house was in King Street, Covent Garden, but he spent much time in the society of the Duchess of Buckingham and Normanby at Buckingham House.

Chamberlen died at Buckingham House after a long illness on 17 June 1728.

== Works ==
Chamberlen's only published work was a Latin epithalamium, written on the marriage of Princess Anne in 1683.

== Legacy ==
A monument to Chamberlen, put up by the 2nd Duke of Buckingham and Normanby, is in the north choir aisle of Westminster Abbey. His life size effigy reclines in doctoral robes on the lid of a sarcophagus surrounded by emblematic sculptures, while a long Latin epitaph by Atterbury praises his family, his life, his descendants, and his patron. The safe delivery of the Duchess of Buckingham and Normanby, which is mentioned by Atterbury as one of the reasons for the monument, was also commemorated in the 1st Duke of Buckingham and Normanby's essay On Vulgar Errors. The "Psylas" of Samuel Garth's The Dispensary (6th edit. London, 1706, p. 91) also refers to Chamberlen.

Chamberlen's library was sold in 1734 after the death of his widow, and a copy of the catalogue went to the British Museum.

== Family ==
Chamberlen married three times, and had three daughters.
