= Chamberlin (band) =

American folk rock band

- Origin: Vermont, United States
- Genres: Folk rock, indie rock
- Years active: 2010–2013
- Labels: Roll Call Records/EMI
- Members: Mark Daly; Ethan West; Jamie Heintz; Eric Maier; Charles Whistler

Chamberlin is an American folk rock band from Vermont. The band is currently on Roll Call/EMI Records.

== Career ==
Chamberlin formed in Spring 2010 when members Mark Daly and Ethan West co-wrote and demoed nine songs at a mountainside cabin in Goshen, Vermont. By June, they acquired Jamie Heintz, Eric Maier, and Charles Whistler to finish the group. A month later, the band was signed to Roll Call Records.

In August 2010, they recorded their debut album, Bitter Blood, with producer Scott Tournet (guitarist for Grace Potter And The Nocturnals) and engineer Ben Collette at The Tank Studio in Burlington, VT. In early 2011, Chamberlin supported Grace Potter and The Nocturnals on their winter tour.

== Band members ==
- Mark Daly
- Ethan West
- Jamie Heintz
- Charles Whistler

== Former band members ==
- Eric Maier

== Discography ==
- Bitter Blood (Roll Call Records, 2011)
- Cabin Covers EP (Roll Call Records, 2011)
- Look What I've Become (Audiotree Records, 2012)
