= D.S. Chamberlain Building =

- U.S. National Register of Historic Places
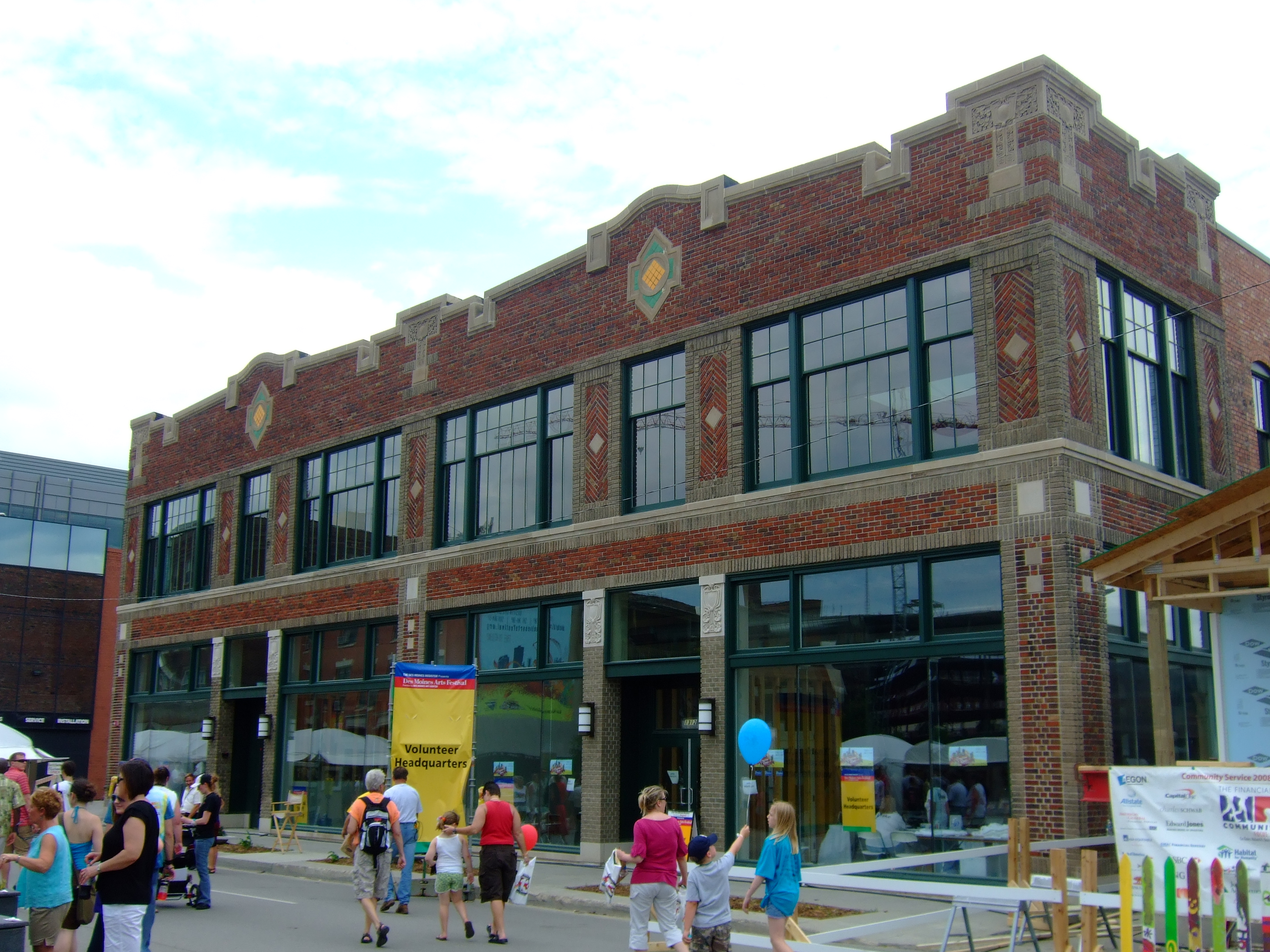

- Location within Iowa Location within the United States
- Location: 1312 Locust St. Des Moines, Iowa
- Coordinates: 41°35′4″N 93°38′3″W
- Area: less than one acre
- Built: 1917
- Architect: Proudfoot, Bird & Rawson
- Architectural style: Late 19th and Early 20th Century American Movements
- MPS: Architectural Legacy of Proudfoot & Bird in Iowa MPS
- NRHP reference No.: 07000346
- Added to NRHP: June 28, 2007

The D.S. Chamberlain Building, also known as the L. W. Taylor Motor Company and Payne Motor Company Building, is a historic building located in Des Moines, Iowa, United States. The two-story brick structure was designed by the prominent Des Moines architectural firm of Proudfoot, Bird & Rawson. Completed in 1917, it features elongated Chicago-style windows on the upper floors and simple geometric details on the cornice level that reflect the Collegiate Gothic style. The building was built as a speculative venture by Davis S. Chamberlain, who was one of the founders of his family's drug manufacturing company. It is located in the city's "Motor Row" or "Auto Row" on the west side of downtown. In 1916 there were 111 motor related firms in Des Moines that was valued at $12 million in annual trade. Both the Taylor Motor Company and the Payne Motor Company were housed in the double storefront building for many years. Other car dealerships followed. The building was listed on the National Register of Historic Places in 2007. In addition to the Chamberlain Building, D.S. Chamberlain built the Chamberlain Hotel at &th and Locust and West Chester (Chamberlain Mansion, Des Moines, Iowa), his home, located at 3520 Grand Avenue, which is also on the National Register of Historic Places. West Chester is currently known as The Chamberlain Mansion.
