= Hester Shaw (midwife) =

English midwife and pamphlet writer

Hester Shaw (c. 1580 – 1660) was an English midwife and pamphlet writer who opposed Peter Chamberlen III.

== Early life ==
She was probably born Hester Essex in 1586, the only daughter of Nicholas Essex, and practised midwifery in London. She married John Shaw, churchwarden of Allhallows parish, before 1610, and they had two daughters.

== Petition ==
In 1634, along with a fellow midwife, Elizabeth Whipp, she presented a petition of sixty midwives to King Charles I, the bishop of London, and the College of Physicians opposing Peter Chamberlen’s proposal to bring the licensing of London midwives under his own control, rather than that of the Church of England. The petition argued that Chamberlen’s proposal would contravene their oaths because of his preference for wealthy patients over poor ones, and warned that Chamberlen had an interest in keeping midwives ignorant so that they would consult himself and his family. The College and the Bishop of London, William Juxon, decided in favour of the midwives and rejected Chamberlen’s plan.

== Pamphlet writing ==
In 1653, Shaw engaged in a pamphlet-writing campaign against the Rev. Thomas Clendon, whom she claimed had tried to defraud her of money after a gunpowder explosion at her house in 1649/50. Clendon wrote Justifications Justified against her, and she responded with A Plaine Relation of my Sufferings and Mrs Shaw’s Innocence Restored. George Thomason also attributes to her an anonymous 1649 pamphlet about the explosion, Death’s Master-Peece.

She was buried in Allhallows parish on 18 June 1660.
