= Warren D. Chamberlain =

American lawyer and politician

Warren Douglas Chamberlain (February 2, 1927 – October 4, 2013) was an American lawyer and politician.

Born in Washington Township, Marion County, Iowa, Chamberlain served in the United States Navy during World War II. He then went to Marquette University, Northern State University, and received his law degree from William Mitchell College of Law. Chamberlain practiced law in Faribault, Minnesota and served as city attorney and municipal court judge. From 1967 to 1973, Chamberlain served in the Minnesota House of Representatives. He died at his home in Fairbault, Minnesota.
