= Chamberlin Springs =

Woodland site in Wisconsin, US

Coordinates: 42°31′14″N 89°06′11″W

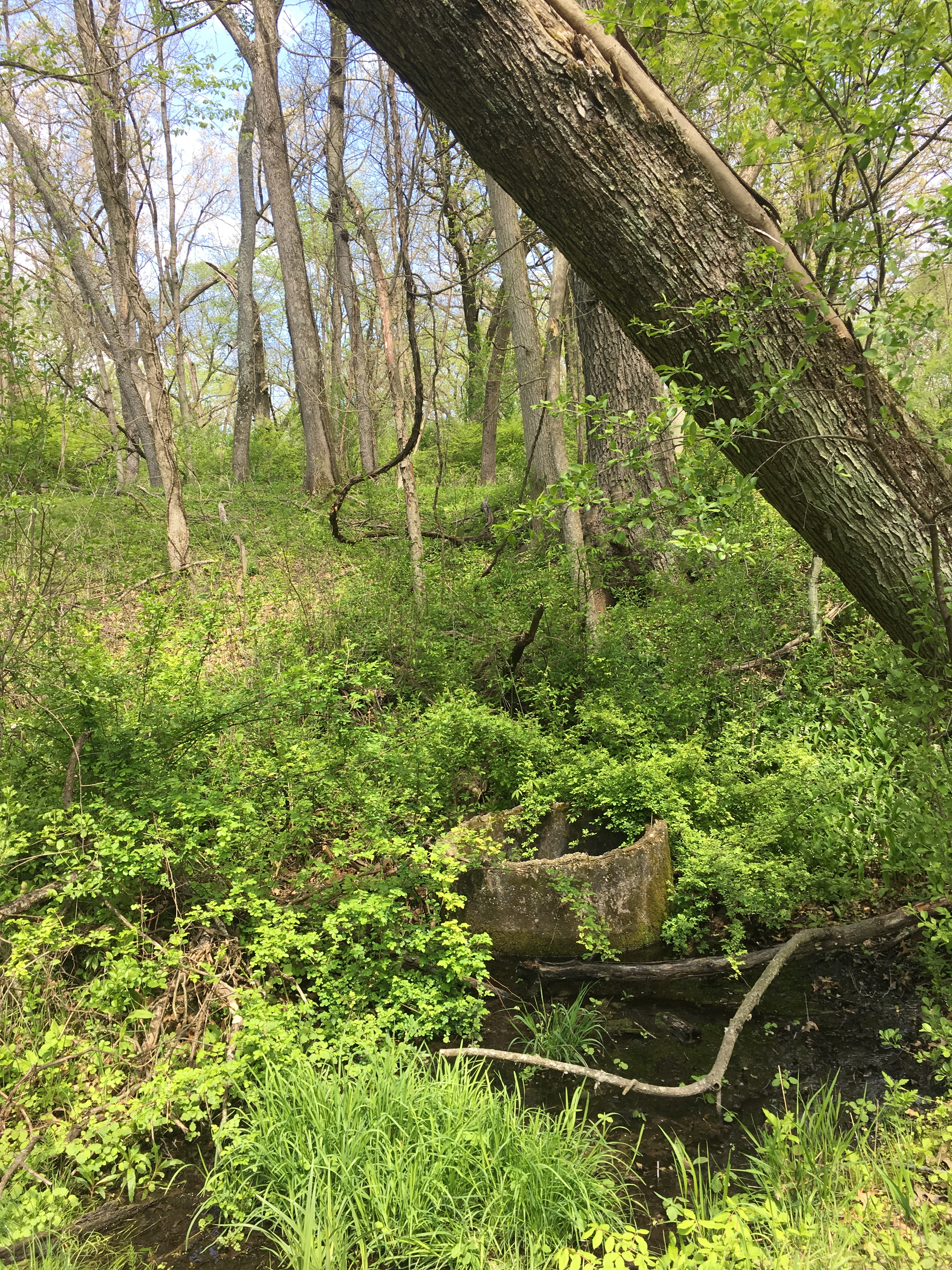
A cistern at the Chamberlin Springs site, potentially where the water was bottled in the late 1800s.

Chamberlin Springs is a former recreational site outside of Beloit, Wisconsin, United States, that is now property of Beloit College. Started by Thomas Chrowder Chamberlin, a graduate of Beloit College in 1866, and his brother, John Chamberlin. Chamberlin Springs was originally a spring water business run by the Iodo-Magnesian Spring Company. Water from the spring was bottled up and sold for $7.00 "per barrel of 40 gallon, including package." The water from Chamberlin Springs was said to have healing properties, and was endorsed by several prominent community members from Beloit, including Beloit College's first President Aaron Lucius Chapin. The Iodo-Magnesian Springs, as they were originally called, attracted people from all across the Midwest, not just Beloit or Wisconsin as a whole. Chamberlin Springs is now a property of Beloit College and is used by students for geological, anthropological, and ecological research.

== Historical background ==
=== Thomas Chrowder Chamberlin ===
Thomas Chrowder Chamberlin, or T.C. as he liked to be known, was a geologist, entrepreneur, and occasional administrator. Chamberlin moved near Beloit, Wisconsin at a young age and his parents settled the 160 acres where the site lies today. While his brother John stayed and worked on the family farm, T.C. went to school at Beloit College. In 1875, the brothers began to market the site as a water source, but it quickly became a regional sensation with bottles being distributed and sold throughout the Midwest. In the meantime, T.C. worked as a high school principal, Beloit College professor, and accomplished geologist. He even worked for two of Beloit's largest manufacturing companies, serving as the Director of the Rock River Paper Company and the Vice President of Merrill and Houston Iron Works. After his death in 1928, the property was passed down to T.C.'s son, Rollin Chamberlin. For more information, see T.C. Chamberlin.

=== Iodo-Magnesian Spring Company ===
During its years of operation, Chamberlin Springs was managed by the Iodo-Magnesian Spring Company. The company managed to draw regional attention to the springs by marketing the curative properties of the water. According to an 1870s brochure put out by the group, the iodine and bromine contents, lack of organic material, and minerals such as lime gave the water remarkable purity. These qualities, they claimed, gave the water healing properties for a wide variety of health issues such as diabetes, liver ailments, rheumatism, and kidney disease. Development around the springs included a large gazebo, stairs, and landscaping, which enticed visitors from as far Milwaukee, Chicago, and St. Louis to visit the springs and stay in nearby Beloit. For those unable to reach the springs, the Iodo-Magnesian Company ran a business which distributed and sold the water by the bottle, keg, and even barrel.

=== Popularity ===
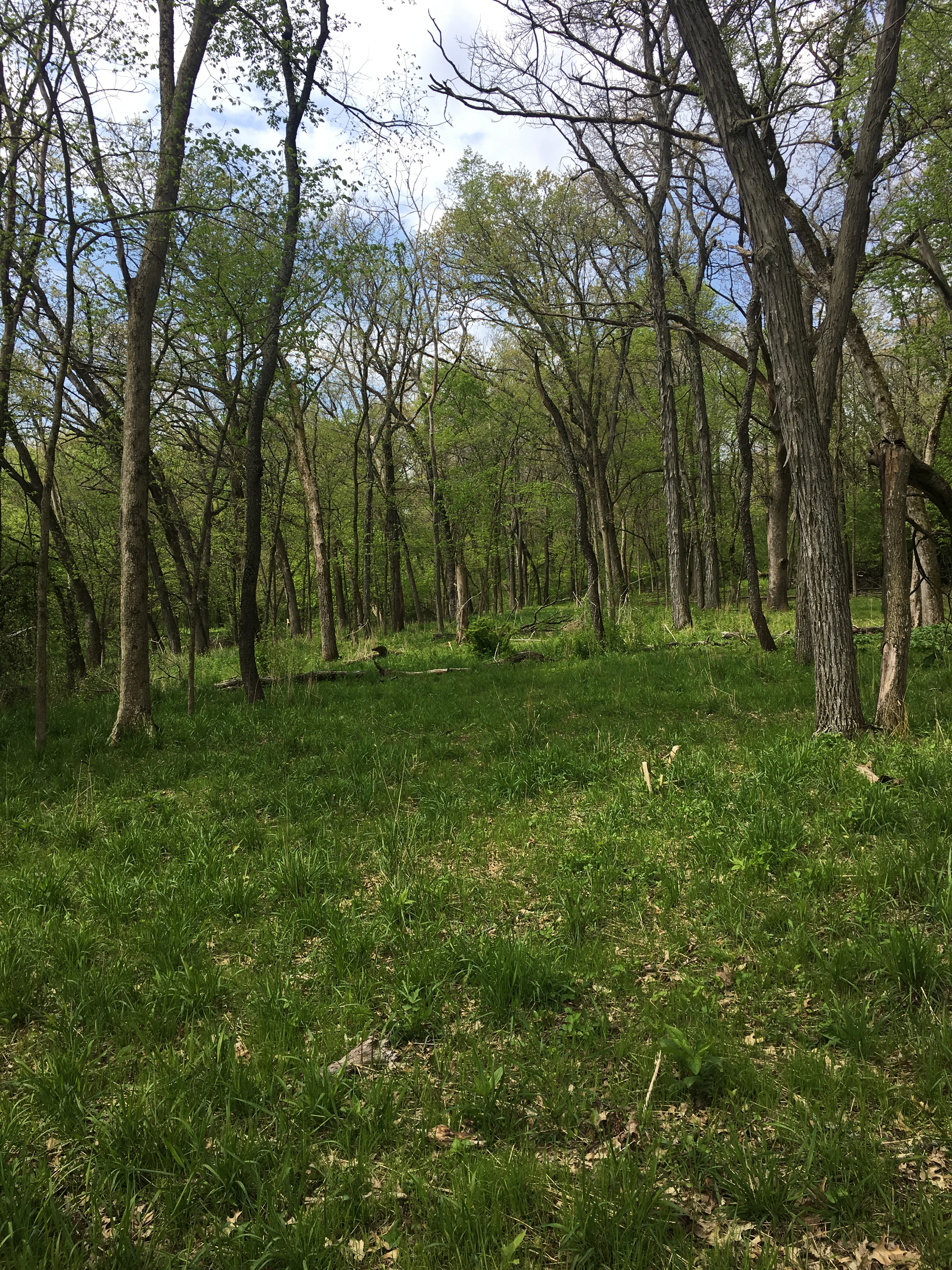
Picnics and other social events would have taken place in this area just above the springs.

At the peak of its of fame, the site could garner quite the gathering on the weekends. Drinking from the waters was a social event and guests hosted often large picnics in the grassy clearing just above the springs. In fact, the old road leading to the springs suffered from heavy erosion due to the heavy traffic the springs brought, prompting city officials to consider building a trolley line to the area. Guests from far away would sometimes even stay in the Chamberlin family home nearby.

== Beloit College ownership ==
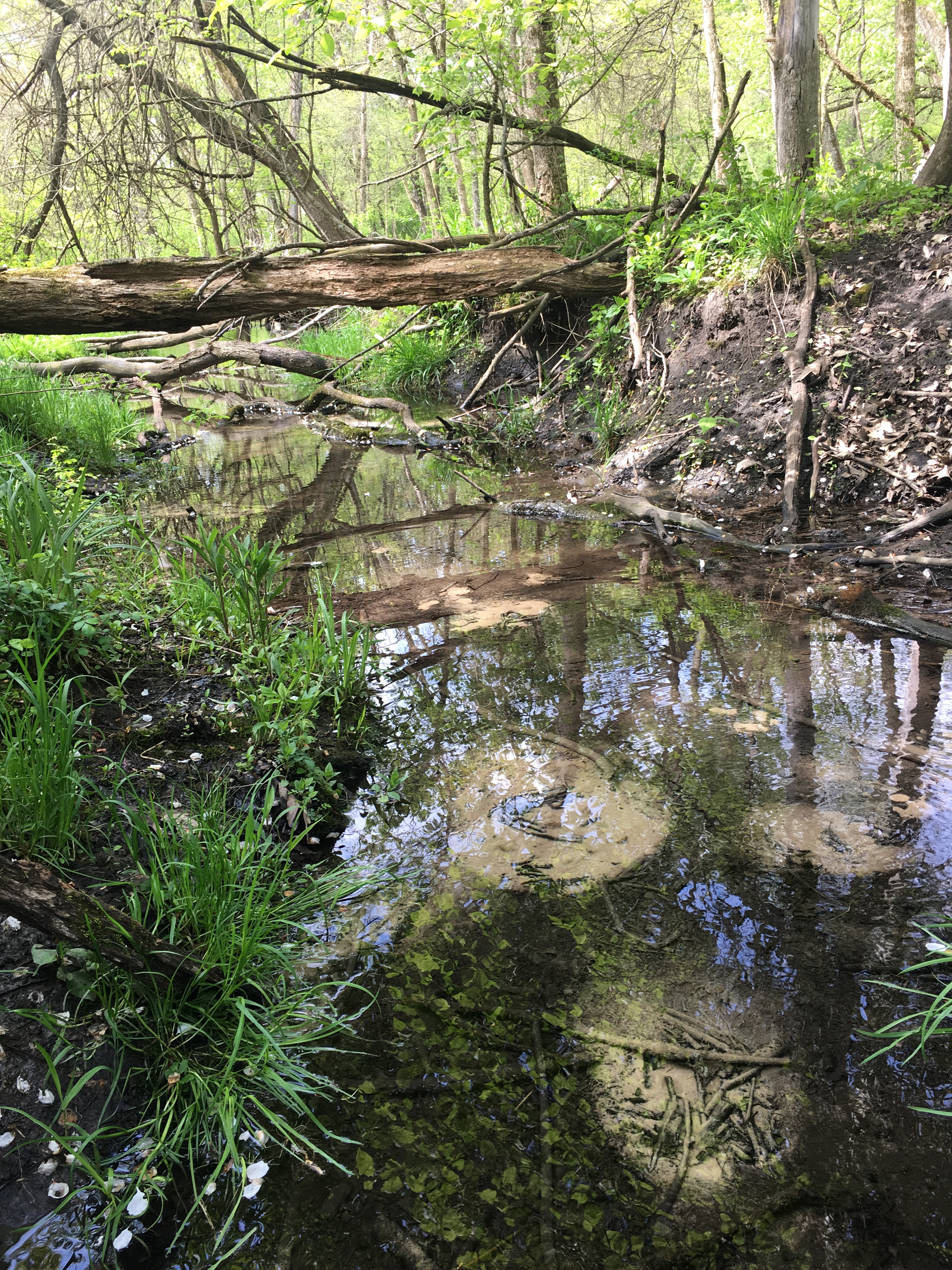
A picture of the actual springs on site. The lightly colored, sandy area is where the water escapes from the ground.

In 1946, the property was gifted to Beloit College by T.C. Chamberlin's son, Rollin Chamberlin. Geology Professor Monta Wing, who arrived at Beloit College in 1923 after working at the University of Chicago, was a primary factor in convincing Rollin to donate the property to the college; Wing took several trips down to Chicago to speak with the Chamberlin family in an attempt to complete this goal. Eventually, in 1946, he did, and for a long period of time, the property was left to become overgrown. Once acquired by the college, the site fulfilled its intended role as a multipurpose bird sanctuary, tree preserve, geology and biology field and research area, and even recreation area until 2000, when the area became overgrown and was rendered unusable. Since the summer of 2012 however, an ongoing restoration project has cleared the immediate area around the spring of invasive overgrowth, removed vegetation to establish a trail and small parking lot, and even erected a locally sourced limestone pillar gate to mark the entrance of the property. Today, the site continues to be used for field research by the departments of geology and biology.

== Scientific work ==
A chemical analysis by the Columbia College Laboratory of the School of Mines was done back in the 1800s at the request of the Chamberlin brothers and placed in a brochure about the "Iodo-Magnesian Springs", advertising its "grains [of different chemicals] in one gallon." 12 different chemicals are identified in the water, and then a few "points of excellence" are identified regarding them.

In 1992, a chemical analysis was done on the springs in order to determine the effects of springs on a stream system. This analysis focuses on how the actual springs influence the creek that they are a part of, as well as how the different rock styles from the Rock River Basin area affect the stream. Additionally, students attending Beloit College also continue to perform research about various topics on site, including hydrology and sustainability.

== Archaeological work ==
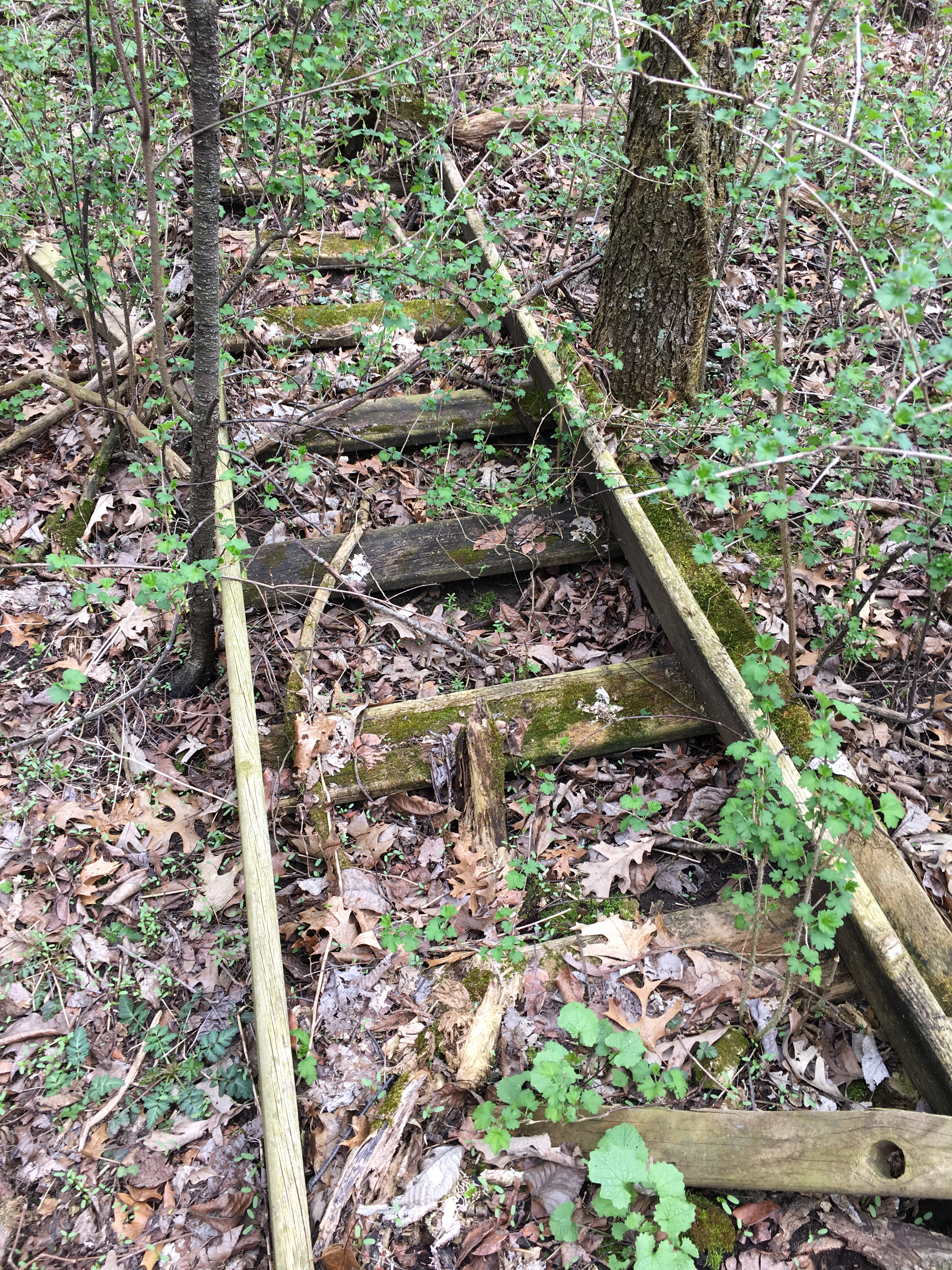
A piece of manufactured wood discovered at the Chamberlin Springs site, 2017.

As of May 2017, no archaeological work has been done on the Chamberlin Springs site. Possible archaeological techniques for examining the site include dendrochronology, Ground Penetrating Radar, Geographic Information Systems Analysis (GIS), and shovel excavations.
