= Hugh Chamberlen =

English royal physician, obstetrician and writer on finance

Hugh Chamberlen the elder (c. 1632 – 17 June 1728) was an English royal physician, obstetrician and writer on finance.

== Life ==
The eldest son of Peter Chamberlen the third by his marriage with Jane, eldest daughter of Sir Hugh Myddelton, bart., he was born in the parish of St. Anne's, Blackfriars, between 1630 and 1634. He is styled Doctor of Medicine in the lists of the Royal Society.

In 1668 Chamberlen had a project for ridding London of the plague. He acquired a reputation in his profession, more especially as a man-midwife, and on the petition of his father he obtained, in February 1673, the reversion of Sir John Hinton's place as physician in ordinary to the king. The office fell to him the following October. He was elected a Fellow of the Royal Society in April 1681.

In March 1688 the Royal College of Physicians, on the information of Walter Charleton, took action against Chamberlen for the "illegal and evil" practice of medicine. He continued, however, to enjoy an extensive business at court, while he was selected by James II to attend Mary of Modena in her confinements. At the birth of Prince James Francis Edward Stuart, on 10 June 1688, Chamberlen came too late to be present. He later wrote a letter to the Electress Sophia of Hanover on the circumstances, dated from the Hague on 4 October 1713.

Chamberlen's politics were those of the Whigs. George Wingrove Cooke considered that Chamberlen had suffered for his political principles. He had a general pardon issued in June 1686.

Chamberlen ultimately went to Amsterdam, where he practised for several years. He parted with the family secret of the midwifery forceps to the Dutch surgeon Hendrik van Roonhuisen. He was still alive in November 1720.

== Works ==
In August 1670, while staying at Paris, Chamberlen met the surgeon François Mauriceau, and two years later he published a translation of Mauriceau's treatise on mid-wifery. This became for a standard text-book, in editions republished to 1765. In the preface are statements relating to the invention and use of the obstetric forceps by the Chamberlen family.

In 1685 Chamberlen published Manuale Medicum: or a small Treatise of the Art of Physick in general and of Vomits and the Jesuits Powder in particular, London, 1685. This book was written for a son sent to the East Indies. Professional colleagues judged him from it an empiric.

Chamberlen's last medical work was A few Queries relating to the Practice of Physick (1694). It added little to the Manuale Medicum, but touched on preventive medicine with A Proposal for the better securing, of health, intended in the year 1689 and still ready to be humbly offered to the Consideration of the Honourable Houses of Parliament. He also published The Great Advantages of both Kingdoms of Scotland and England, by an Union. By a Friend to Britain (1702).

=== The "land bank" ===
In November 1690, Chamberlen issued a first draft of his financial scheme Dr. Hugh Chamberlen's Proposal to make England Rich and Happy. A bank was to advance money on the security of landed property by issuing large quantities of notes. James Hobson Aveling catalogued 45 pamphlet replies. Chamberlen set apart three evenings in the week to promote his project, and lobbied Members of Parliament.

In December 1693 Chamberlen laid his plan before the House of Commons, and petitioned to be heard. A committee was appointed which reported favourably; but was ignored. Two years later the project was revived in a modified form; and bill passed both houses and received the royal assent in the Taxation, etc. (No. 2) Act 1695 (7 & 8 Will. 3. c. 31) on 27 April 1696 on the last day of that parliament. Chamberlen was mocked, and in March 1699, went to Scotland. In 1700 he was urging the latest version of his land bank scheme on the Parliament of Scotland, in a pamphlet A Few Proposals humbly recommending .... the Establishing a Land-Credit in this Kingdom.

== Family ==
By his marriage on 28 May 1663 at St Paul's, Covent Garden, with Dorothy, daughter of Colonel John Brett, Chamberlen had three sons, Hugh the younger, Peter, and Myddelton, and one daughter, Dorothy.

== Memorial ==
There is a memorial to him at Westminster Abbey.

== Notes ==
Attribution

This article incorporates text from a publication now in the public domain: Stephen, Leslie, ed. (1887). "Chamberlen, Hugh (fl.1720)". Dictionary of National Biography. Vol. 10. London: Smith, Elder & Co.
