= Chamberlayne (surname) =

Chamberlayne is a surname. Notable people with the surname include:

- Edith Chamberlayne (1869–1918), English composer
- Edward Chamberlayne (1616–1703), English writer
- Francis Chamberlayne (after 1667–1728), English politician
- George Chamberlayne (c. 1703–1757), British politician
- John Chamberlayne (c.1668–1723), English writer, translator, and courtier
- John Hampden Chamberlayne (1838–1882), American politician and publisher from Virginia
- Tankerville Chamberlayne (1840–1924), English Member of Parliament
- Thomas Chamberlayne (disambiguation) several men with this name
- William Chamberlayne (poet) (1619–1679), English poet
- William Chamberlayne (MP) (1760–1829), English Member of Parliament and landowner
- Chamberlayne family, an influential family of Weston, Southampton, United Kingdom
- Chamberlayne family, an influential family in Virginia, descended from William Chamberlayne (burgess) of Hereford who settled in New Kent County, Colony of Virginia
