= John Chamberlaine =

John Chamberlaine (1745 – 12 January 1812 in Paddington Green) was an antiquary and acted as keeper of George III's drawings, coins and medals from 1791 until his death in 1812. He published prints of drawings in the Royal Collection by Holbein, Leonardo, Annibale Carracci and others, for which Francesco Bartolozzi (1728–1815) the engraver and etcher, was commissioned as a printmaker.

== Career ==
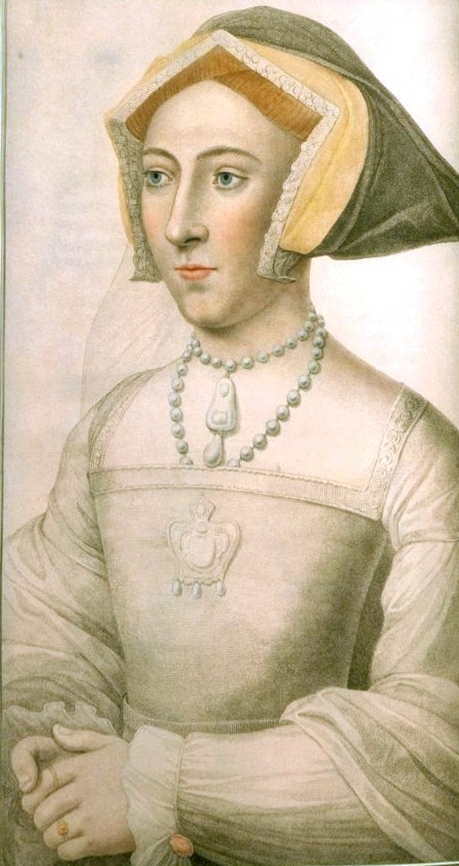
Portrait of Jane Seymour by Antoine Cardon (1772–1813) after Hans Holbein

Chamberlaine was appointed to his post on the death of Dalton in 1791. He collaborated with Frederick Augusta Barnard and published eighty-four plates in 14 parts between March 1792 and February 1800. The work was titled Imitations of Original Drawings by Hans Holbein in the Collection of His Majesty for the Portraits of Illustrious Persons of the Court of Henry VIII. The biographical notes were provided by Edmund Lodge, the Lancaster Herald, the vast majority of the plates being engraved by Francesco Bartolozzi, whom Dalton had imported from Florence in 1764, and some by Anthony Cardon (1772–1813).

He then published Original Designs of the most Celebrated Masters of Bolognese, Roman, Florentine and Venetian Schools, comprising some of the Works of L. da Vinci, the Carracci, C. Lorrain, Raphael, Michael Angelo, the Poussins and Others in His Majesty's Collection., London (1812). The plates for this work were prepared mainly by Bartolozzi with the assistance of his pupil, Tomkins.

Chamberlaine was admitted as a member of the Society of Antiquaries on 7 June 1792. He was also a member of the Society of Arts.

== Provenance ==
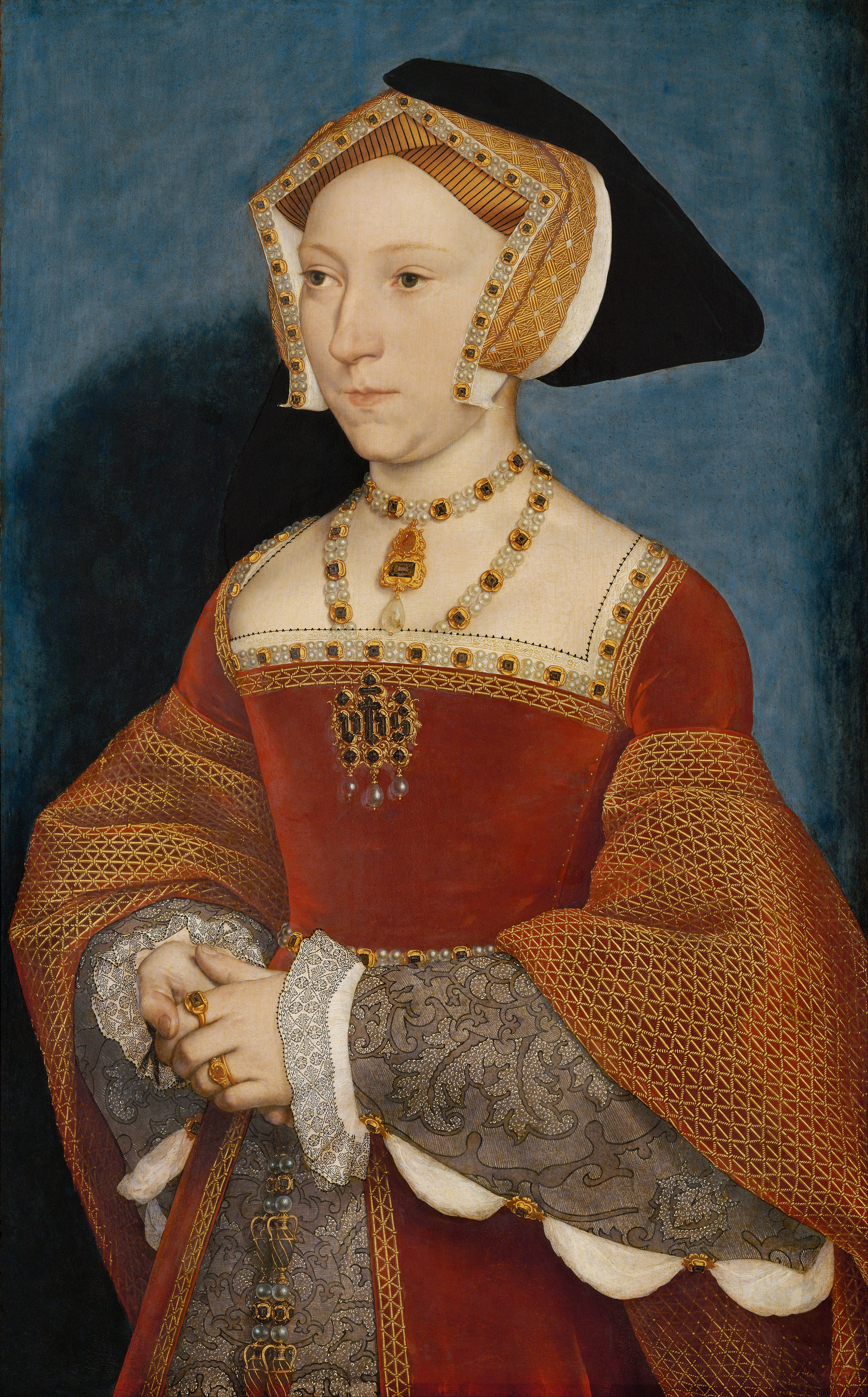
Original portrait by Hans Holbein

The original Holbein drawings had disappeared and reappeared in royal hands a number of times since their creation in the mid-sixteenth century. Caroline of Ansbach framed and hung them at Richmond Lodge. In the 1740s George III had them taken out of their frames and rebounded in two volumes. Richard Dalton, who acted as George III's first librarian, had engravings made of 35 of the drawings between 1774 and 1791. The plates were published by W. Richardson in 1792 and titled The Court of Henry the Eighth; these reproductions turned out to be of poor quality.
