= Frank Chamberlain (cricketer) =

English cricketer

William Richard Frank Chamberlain (1925 – 2004) was an English cricketer who played for Northamptonshire. He appeared in six first-class matches as a right-handed batsman who bowled leg spin. Born in Elton, Huntingdonshire on 13 April 1925, Chamberlain was the son of Elizabeth (née Robson) and Richard Chamberlain. He died in Cambridge on 8 April 2004. He scored 67 runs with a highest score of 14 and took no wickets.

Chamberlain was a director of the family company Chamberlain Phipps, which made shoe industry components and materials. He was also involved in cricket administration, serving as chairman of the Cricket Council from 1990 to 1994 and of the Test and County Cricket Board. A photographic portrait of Chamberlain by Elliott & Fry is in the collection of the National Portrait Gallery, London.
