= Peter Chamberlen the third =

English physician (1601–1683)

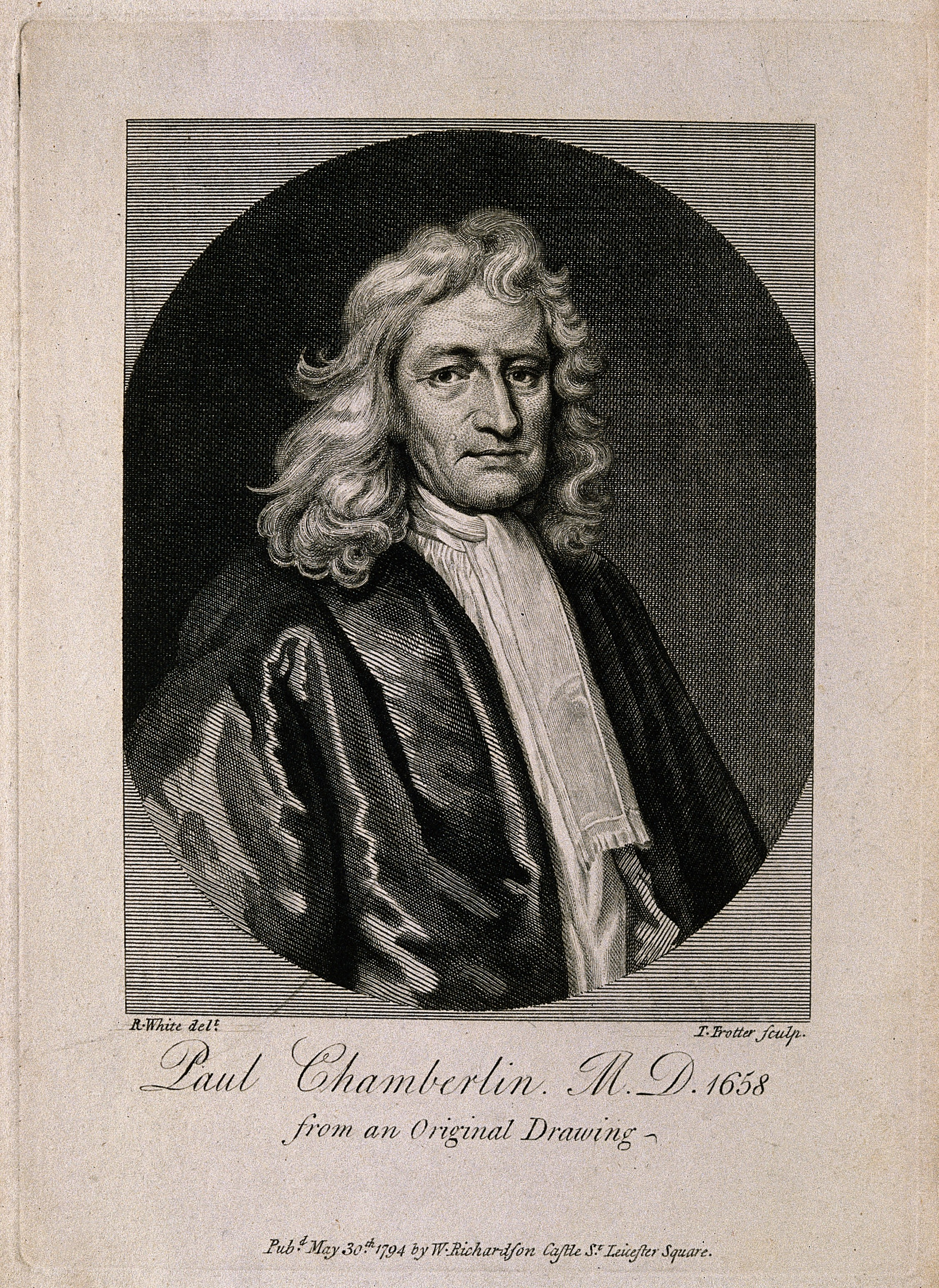
Peter Chamberlen M.D., 1794 engraving with incorrect forename "Paul"

Peter Chamberlen (1601–1683), known as Peter the Third, was an English physician. The obstetrical forceps as invention has been credited to the Chamberlen family: the earliest evidence of what was a family trade secret points to his having it in 1630. He continued the family tradition of trying to bring the profession of midwifery under their control. His writings blend ideas associated with the Fifth Monarchists and Levellers with social schemes of his own with a utopian flavour.

== Early life ==
The eldest son of Peter Chamberlen the younger, he continued the family tradition of medicine and midwifery. He attended Merchant Taylors' School, then Emmanuel College, Cambridge, and took a medical degree at the University of Padua in 1619, leading to his being admitted to degrees also at Oxford and Cambridge. He attended the birth of the future King Charles II by Queen Henrietta Maria.

Chamberlen was a noted medical doctor, and public health advocate. In 1643 he revived the idea of a Corporation of Midwives, an old project of his father's, but encountered opposition. It was opposed by the College of Physicians of London.

== Commonwealth period ==
When the First English Civil War concluded in a victory for the Parliamentarians, Chamberlen in 1648 petitioned Parliament for a monopoly on baths (that is public baths). In this he was successful, despite the opposition in principle of the College of Physicians to the public bathing.

In religion, Chamberlen became an Independent, joining the congregation of Nathaniel Homes that was founded in 1643. This happened around 1649. He then clashed with Homes, however, who imposed a stringent religious discipline on his followers, and became a Baptist. In 1650, Chamberlen engaged in controversy on lay preaching, with Thomas Bakewell and John Brayne. He believed in the observance of the Sabbath as the seventh day of the week, saturday, as a day of rest and holy to God. In 1651, Chamberlen held the first service of the Mill Yard Church established in London, the first known Seventh Day Baptist Church. John More, who joined the Lothbury Baptists, provoked a 1652 disputation, spread over several occasion, between Chamberlen and James Cranford, an orthodox presbyterian minister. Apart from More, Chamberlen at this point gained little support. He later led a Lothbury congregation that was considered a stronghold of the Fifth Monarchists, and included John Spittlehouse; his own views were taken to be General Baptist.

After a rupture with the College of Physicians of London in 1649, Chamberlen moved to Essex, outside the college's jurisdiction, in 1652. His unconventional views became more marked. He debated in 1654 with William Kiffin, a Particular Baptist, on "imposition of hands". In 1659 he debated Sabbatarianism with Jeremiah Ives, a General Baptist radical, at the Stone Chapel near St Paul's Cathedral. Speaking of his political views of the mid-1650s, Toon classes Chamberlen as a Fifth Monarchist, in agreement with Christopher Feake and Nathaniel Rich. At the time, Abiezer Coppe the Ranter was used as a comparison.

== Later life ==
With the restoration of the monarchy in 1660, Chamberlen pointed out to Charles II that he was the only surviving royal physician from before the Commonwealth; and 1661 he was reappointed Physician in ordinary to the King. The appointment may have only had a formal status, however.

Chamberlen's biographer James Hobson Aveling wrote that his "religious exaltation" of later life verged on mental illness. He died in 1683 at Woodham Mortimer Hall, Essex.

== Works ==
A Voice in Rhama, or, The Crie of Women and Children (1647) was Chamberlen's work of advocacy for the professionalisation of midwives, along lines pushed by older members of his family. At this period, the Church of England licensed them. Obstetrics was the subject of demarcation, under which surgeons, rather than physicians, dealt with difficult deliveries. A generation earlier, in 1616. midwives had asked the College of Physicians for permission to organise themselves, a petition forwarded and possible prompted by Peter Chamberlen the younger. His son had suggested himself, in 1634, as governor of a midwifery college, but lost the support of the midwives themselves. His 1647 effort was opposed by the College of Physicians, and was no more successful than the two previous attempts to bring the licensing and control of midwifery under the Chamberlens. The issue continued to be raised. Nicholas Culpeper published a Directory for Midwives in 1651, prompting a rival manual of 1656, in which a member of the Chamberlen family had a hand. The 1687 effort of Elizabeth Cellier to found a "royal college" of midwives may have had the Culpepers' covert backing.

Chamberlen wrote on a wide variety of topics, and some overlapped with the concerns of the Hartlib Circle, such as poor relief on which his pamphlet The Poore Man's Advocate, or England's Samaritan pouring Oyle and Wyne into the Wounds of the Nation (1649) attracted the attention of William Petty. He advocated widespread nationalisation, as did Gerrard Winstanley, the Digger; but differed in defending private property and existing economic arrangements. It has been argued that "utopian" is misleading for Chamberlen: his Fifth Monarchist tenets are more rightly associated with greeting the advent of a new social order.

Sir James Harington, 3rd Baronet acted as spokesman in the Rump Parliament for Chamberlen, who produced a summary Plus Ultra for the Parliament of The Poore Man's Advocate as lobbying material. For his social schemes, of a utopian flavour, Samuel Hartlib, Pieter Corneliszoon Plockhoy and John Jubbes have been suggested as possible influences. He opposed the death penalty for theft, as did contemporaries Samuel Chidley, William Cole, Hugh Peter, and William Tomlinson. Christopher Hill commented on this "medical radical" and Margaret James's assertion, that Chamberlen, Balthazar Gerbier and Hartlib were the only writers of the time seriously concerned with "the lot of the poor", adding Plockoy to the list.

== Legacy ==
Chamberlen in 1638 acquired Woodham Mortimer Hall, a 17th-century gabled house in Essex, which became the family home.

A blue plaque fixed to the hall notes them as pioneering obstetricians. The hall passed out of the Chamberlen family in 1715 when the family home was sold. Dr Peter Chamberlen's own forceps were found in 1813 under a trap door in the loft of the hall. They were given to the Medical and Chirurgical Society which passed them to the Royal Society of Medicine in 1818.

== Family ==
Chamberlen married, first, Jane Myddelton, eldest daughter of Sir Hugh Myddelton, 1st Baronet. His second wife was Ann Harrison. He had, in all, 14 sons and four daughters.

Hugh Chamberlen the elder (1634 – after 1720), the eldest son of the first marriage, also practised obstetrics using the forceps. Another son, Paul (1635–1717), was a quack doctor well-regarded in his time, now remembered for his "anodyne necklace" which, he claimed, could promote healthy pregnancy and easier labour, and ward off the dangers of teething when worn by the child. Hovenden Walker was the son of Peter Chamberlen's daughter Elizabeth.

== See also ==
- Sabbath in Christianity
- Seventh Day Baptists
