= Peter Chamberlen the younger =

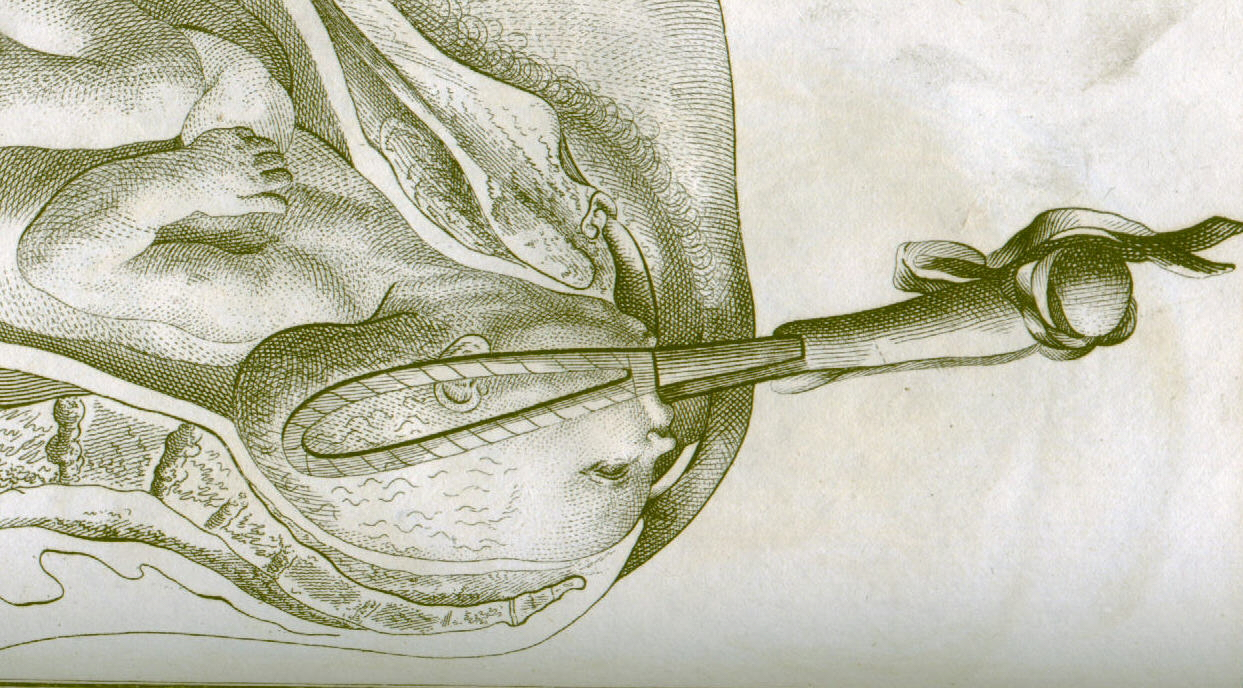
Obstetrical Forceps, by Smellie (1792)

Peter Chamberlen (or Pierre) (1572–1626) was the younger of two brothers with the same first name, both the sons of Guillaume (William) Chamberlen (c. 1540 – 1596), a Huguenot surgeon who fled from Paris to England in 1569.

The Chamberlens are famous for inventing the modern use of obstetrical forceps. It remained a family secret for nearly two centuries and through four generations of accoucheur. The scanty evidence for the early use of the forceps only suggests, however, that Peter Chamberlen the third, in the next generation, may have had it.

== Peter the Younger ==
Peter the Younger lived from 1572 to 1626 and worked as surgeon and obstetrician. He married Sara Delaune, the daughter of William Delaune, a Huguenot refugee physician and minister, and the sister of Gideon Delaune, apothecary. They had eight children, among them Dr. Peter Chamberlen (1601–1683) (see below).

Peter the Elder is believed to be the inventor of the forceps. The brothers went to great length to keep the secret. When they arrived at the home of a woman in labour, two people had to carry a massive box with gilded carvings into the house. The pregnant patient was blindfolded so as not to reveal the secret, while all others had to leave the room. Then the operator went to work. The people outside heard screams, bells, and other strange noises until the cry of the baby indicated a successful delivery.

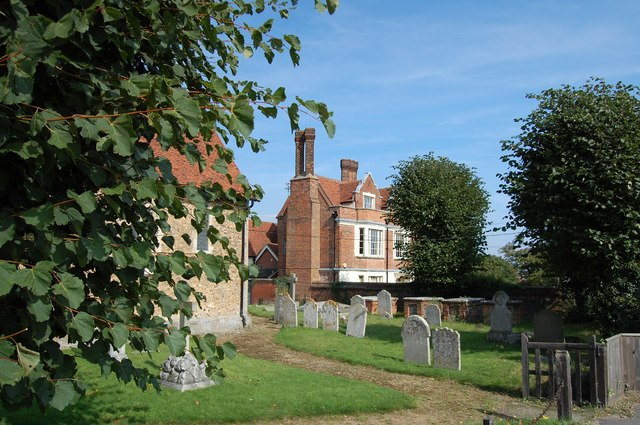
Woodham Mortimer Hall, home of the Chamberlen family

The two families lived in London, Peter the Elder in the parish of St. Dionys Backchurch, and Peter the Younger in the Liberty of Blackfriars, where the church of St Ann Blackfriars had Huguenots in the congregation. As they became wealthy and established in English life, Peter the Elder acquired property in at Downe, Kent, where Peter the Younger died, Croydon, Keston and Farnborough. All of it passed to his grandson, Thomas Cargill.

== Peter the Third ==
Born in 1601, he was the eldest son of Peter the younger, and became a physician. He died in 1683.

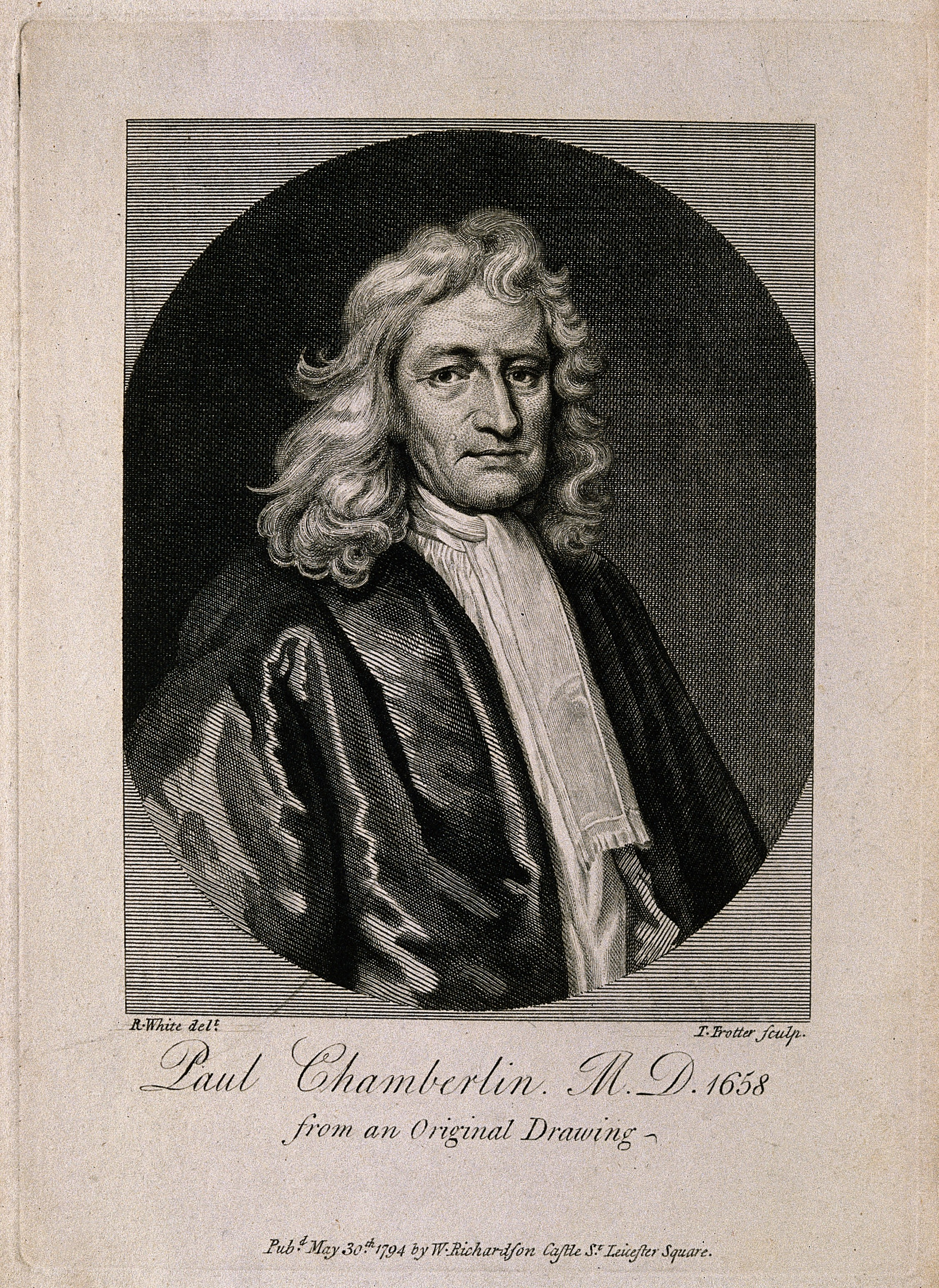
P. Chamberlen. Line engraving by T. Trotter, 1794 (incorrect name Paul)
