= Social thinking of Arthur de Gobineau =

The French aristocrat Arthur de Gobineau developed a set of ideas that were influential during his life and some of them that impacted later social thinkers, such politicians, anthropologists, and sociologists. While still alive, he was a major influence on "Gobinism", also known as Gobineauism, an academic, political and social movement formed in 19th-century Germany. An ethnically pro-Germanic, anti-national and particularly anti-French ideology, the movement influenced German nationalists and intellectuals such as Richard Wagner, Friedrich Nietzsche.

== Racial theories ==
Shocked by the Revolution of 1848, Gobineau first expressed his racial theories in his 1848 epic poem Manfredine. In it he revealed his fear of the revolution being the beginning of the end of aristocratic Europe, with common folk descended from lesser breeds taking over. The poem, set at the time of the revolt in Naples against Spanish rule in 1647 (an allegory for 1848), concerns the eponymous character, a noblewoman on whom Gobineau spends a good five hundred lines tracing her descent from Viking ancestors. It features the lines:

Et les Germains, montrant leur chevelure blonde, Que portaient leurs aïeux, dans tous les coins du monde, Paraissent pour régner. Neptune et son trident, Servent l'Anglo-Saxon, leur dernier descendant, Et les déserts peuplés de la jeune Amérique, Connaissenet le pouvior de ce peuple héroïque, Mais Romains, Allemands, Gaulois, [...] Pour en finir, Ce qui n'est pas Germain est créé pour servir.

And the Germanic People, displaying the blond hair of their ancestors, emerged to rule in every corner of the world. Neptune and his trident serve the Anglo-Saxon, their last descendant, and the peopled deserts of young America know the strength of this heroic people. But as to the Romans, Germans, Gauls, [...] to put it briefly, those who are not German are created to serve.

Gobineau came to believe race created culture. He argued that distinctions among the three races—"black" (Negroid race), "white" (Caucasian race) and "yellow" (Mongoloid race)—were natural barriers; "race-mixing” breaks those barriers and leads to chaos. Of the three races, he argued blacks were physically very strong but incapable of intelligent thought. Regarding the "yellows" (Asians) he said they were physically and intellectually mediocre but had an extremely strong materialism that allowed them to achieve certain results. Finally, Gobineau wrote whites were the best and greatest of the three races as they alone were capable of intelligent thought, creating beauty and were the most beautiful. "The white race originally possessed the monopoly of beauty, intelligence and strength" he wrote, and any positive qualities the Asians and blacks possessed was due to subsequent miscegenation.

Within the white race, there was a further subdivision between the Aryans, who were the epitome of all that was great about the white race and non-Aryans. Gobineau took the term Aryan ("light one" or "noble one") from Hindu legend and mythology, which describes how the Indian subcontinent was conquered at some time in the distant past by the Aryans. This is generally believed to have reflected folk memories of the arrival of the Indo-European peoples into the Indian subcontinent. In the 19th century, there had been much public interest in the discovery by Orientalists like William Jones of the Indo-European languages, and that apparently unrelated languages such as English, Irish, Albanian, Italian, Greek, Russian, Sanskrit, Hindi, Bengali, Kurdish, Persian and so forth were all part of the same family of languages spoken across a wide swath of Eurasia from Ireland to India. The ancient Hindu scriptures with their tales of Aryan heroes were of major interest to scholars attempting to trace the origins of the Indo-European peoples. Gobineau believed the white race had originated somewhere in Siberia, the Asians in the Americas and the blacks in Africa. He thought the numerical superiority of the Asians had forced the whites to make a vast migration that led them into Europe, the Middle East and the Indian subcontinent; both the Bible and Hindu legends about the conquering Aryan heroes reflected folk memories of this migration. In turn, the whites had broken into three sub-races, namely the Hamitic, Semitic and Japhetic peoples. The latter were the Aryans of Hindu legends and were the best and greatest of all the whites.

He originally wrote that, given the past trajectory of civilization in Europe, white race miscegenation was inevitable and would result in growing chaos. Though not expressly obsessed with antisemitism, Gobineau saw the Jews as praiseworthy for their ability to avoid miscegenation while at the same time depicting them as another alien force for the decay of Aryan Europe. Gobineau thought the development of civilization in other periods was different from that of his own, and speculated that other races might have superior qualities in those civilizations. But, he believed European civilization represented the best of what remained of ancient civilizations and held the most superior attributes capable for continued survival.

=== Focus on Aryans as a superior race ===
Gobineau asserted that the Aryans had founded the ten great civilizations of the world, writing: "In the ten civilizations no Negro race is seen an initiator. Only when it is mixed with some other, can it even be initiated into a civilization. Similarly, no spontaneous civilization is to be found among the yellow races; and when the Aryan blood is exhausted stagnation supervenes". Gobineau, mindful of his own supposed noble and Frankish descent classified the Germanic peoples as being the Aryans in Europe.

He believed Aryans had also moved into India and Persia. Gobineau used medieval Persian epic poetry, which he treated as completely historically accurate accounts, together with the beauty of Persian women (whom he saw as the most beautiful in the world) to argue that Persians were once great Aryans, but unfortunately the Persians had interbred too often with the Semitic Arabs for their own good. At the same time, Gobineau argued that in Southeast Asia the blacks and Asians had intermixed to create the sub-race of the Malays. He classified Southern Europe, South-Eastern Europe, the Middle East, Central Asia, and North Africa as racially mixed.

Gobineau's primary thesis was that European civilization flowed from Greece to Rome, and then to Germanic and contemporary civilization. He thought this corresponded to the ancient Indo-European culture, which earlier anthropologists had misconceived as "Aryan"—a term that only Indo-Iranians are known to have used in ancient times. This included groups classified by language like the Celts, Slavs and the Germans. Gobineau later came to use and reserve the term Aryan only for the "Germanic race", and described the Aryans as la race germanique. By doing so, he presented a racist theory in which Aryans—that is Germanic people—were all that was positive.

Gobineau described the Aryans as physically extremely beautiful and very tall; of immense intelligence and strength, and endowed with incredible energy, great creativity in the arts and a love of war. Like many other racists, he believed one's looks determined what one did, or in other words, that beautiful people created beautiful art while ugly people created ugly art. He attributed much of the economic turmoil in France to pollution of the races.

Despite his pride in being French, Gobineau often attacked many aspects of French life under the Third Republic as reflecting "democratic degeneration"—namely the chaos that he believed resulted when the mindless masses were allowed political power—which meant that critical reception of Gobineau in France was very mixed. His contempt for ordinary people emerges from his letters, where his preferred term for common folk was la boue ("the mud"). Gobineau questioned the belief that the black and yellow races belong to the same human family as the white race and share a common ancestor. Trained neither as a theologian nor a naturalist, and writing before the popular spread of evolutionary theory, Gobineau took the Bible to be a true telling of human history.

== Other views and writings ==
=== Novels and essays ===
Besides promoting racism, Gobineau also wrote several well received novels. Writers such as Marcel Proust, Jean Cocteau and André Gide have praised him as one of France's greatest novelists. In his native France, he has been and is still often praised by literary critics as a master of French style whose novels were written with elegant verve and a superb sense of irony. French critic Pierre-Louis Rey and British historian Michael D. Biddiss have both decried the tendency of French critics to sever Gobineau the racist from Gobineau the novelist, maintaining his novels reflect his racial theories just as much as the Essai. Gobineau's 1874 novel Les Pléiades is concerned with a few exceptionally talented people who are examples of "ethnic persistence" in Europe surrounded by vast masses of morons. In his introduction to Les Pléiades, Gobineau says the purpose of the novel is to advance the theory "that there are no longer classes, that there are no longer peoples, but only—in the whole of Europe—certain individuals who float like the wreckage upon the flood".

Another one of his literary works is Nouvelles Asiatiques (1876), which concerns the impact of miscegenation in modern Asia as reflected in the life stories of a diverse group of people. Nouvelles Asiatiques is unique as his only novel to feature non-white protagonists. In common with his other novels, its message is fundamentally pessimistic, but it allows Gobineau's intense affection for Persia to shine through.

Despite its title, Nouvelles Asiatiques is a series of "Oriental" short stories set in Persia, Afghanistan and Central Asia. Its recurring theme is that the character of the people is determined by race. An example is an Uzbek noblewoman, adopted by a Russian officer, retaining the ferocity of her race by attempting to blind his biological daughter while an Afghan prince rises far above the rest because of his Aryan blood.

In his 1877 novel La Renaissance, Gobineau again highlights the theme of a few gifted "Aryan" heroes such as Cesare Borgia and Pope Julius II having the misfortune to be surrounded by an endless multitude of debased inferiors. In La Renaissance, he attacks the entire idea of morality as the basis of action, arguing that a superior few should not be governed by any set of universal moral values. As such, Pope Alexander VI is presented as a hero in La Renaissance, precisely because of the utterly ruthless way in which he advanced the interests of the Borgia family in defiance of morality.

=== Friendship with Richard Wagner ===
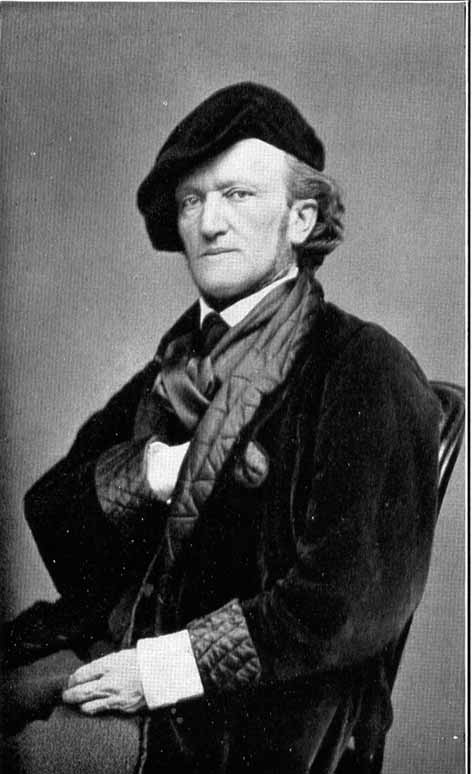
The German composer Richard Wagner, whom Gobineau befriended late in his life, shown in a photograph taken in Paris, 1867

Though a proud Frenchman, Gobineau was cosmopolitan and regarded himself as part of a cultured European elite that transcended national loyalties—a good Frenchman but even more so a "good European". Gobineau felt more affinity for fellow aristocrats of other nationalities than he did for French commoners. The Czech historian Ivo Budil called him "... a cosmopolitan thinker who did not feel wholly French", and who was obsessed with ancient Greece and Persia.

In 1876, Gobineau accompanied his close friend Pedro II on his trip to Russia, Greece and the Ottoman Empire. Gobineau introduced him to both Emperor Alexander II of Russia and Sultan Abdul Hamid II of the Ottoman Empire. He took his friend on a guided tour of Athens, a city he called "heaven on earth" due to its ruins. Inspired by his last visit to Greece, Gobineau began to write what became his 1878 book Le Royaume des Hellènes ("The Kingdom of the Hellenes"). In it he argues the achievements of ancient Greece were all due to the Aryans, and there existed no connection between the ancient Greeks and modern Greeks, as the Aryan blood was all gone. After leaving Pedro II in Constantinople, Gobineau traveled to Rome, Italy, for a private audience with Pope Pius IX.

During his visit to Rome, Gobineau met and befriended the German composer Richard Wagner and his wife Cosima. Wagner was greatly impressed with the Essai sur l'inégalité des races humaines and he used his newspaper Bayreuther Blätter to popularize Gobineau's racial theories in Germany. Gobineau, in turn, was greatly impressed with Wagner's music and unusually for a Frenchman, he became a member of the Bayreuth Circle. Wagner was very interested in Gobineau's racial theories, and many of his writings from the period show Gobineau's influence. Field wrote that "Gobineau's chief work, Essai sur l'inégalité des races humaines contained a far more detailed and closely argued explanation for cultural decadence than anything Wagner had written. Indeed, this synthesis of anthropology, theology, linguistics and history was unquestionably the most impressive and ideologically coherent racial analysis produced in the pre-Darwinian era."

It remains a matter of dispute whether Gobineau's ideas were also incorporated into Wagner's last opera Parsifal. Cosima Wagner wrote to Gobineau in May 1881 to tell him: "My husband is quite at your service, always reading The Races when he is not at work with the staging." Gobineau wrote back to say: "I assure you there is no Bayreuthian more faithful than I". However, while accepting some of Gobineau's basic views into his theories, Wagner rejected Gobineau's pessimism about the fate of humanity and instead created a concept of regeneration, wherein it would return to its past purity by embracing his version of Christianity influenced by the philosophy of Schopenhauer.

=== Gobineau and war ===
Despite having failed the entrance exams to St. Cyr, Gobineau had an intensely militaristic view of the world, believing different races were born to hate each other and humans have an innate desire to kill one another. He wrote war was a natural part of the human condition and for a nation: "It will either conquer or be conquered". Gobineau dismissed pacifism, writing: "Even if the friends of universal peace succeeded in making Europe disgusted with war, they would still have to bring about a permanent change in the passions of mankind" and that peace was only possible "if all races were actually gifted, in the same degree, with the same powers". Despite being a diplomat whose nominal job was to achieve French policy goals without resorting to war, and despite his personal distaste for the House of Bonaparte, Gobineau very much welcomed the militarism of Napoleon III as bringing greatness back to France. In 1854, Gobineau approved of the Crimean War, writing that France would gain much prestige by declaring war on Russia. In a letter to his sister Caroline in October 1854, Gobineau wrote: "After twenty years of a peace that has promoted only corruption and revolution, we find ourselves in a military atmosphere which, from its very beginning, has encouraged many fine things. [...] I consider war, despite its evils, as a blessing."

=== Empires ===
Paradoxically, although Gobineau saw hope in the expansion of European power, he did not support the creation of commercial empires with their attendant multicultural milieu. He concluded the development of empires was ultimately destructive to the "superior races" that created them, since they led to the mixing of distinct races. Instead, he saw the later period of the 19th century imperialism as a degenerative process in European civilization. He continually referred to past empires in Europe and their attendant movement of non-white peoples into European homelands, in explaining the ethnography of the nations of Europe.

According to his theories, the mixed populations of Spain, most of France and Italy, most of Southern Germany, most of Switzerland and Austria, and parts of Britain derived from the historical development of the Roman, Greek, and Ottoman empires, which had brought the non-Aryan peoples of Africa and the Mediterranean cultures to western and northern Europe. He believed the populations of southern and western Iran, southern Spain and Italy consisted of a degenerative race arising from miscegenation, and the whole of north India consisted of a "yellow" (Asian) race. Gobineau was extremely hostile towards Slavic peoples, especially Russians who, he thought, had become a semi-Asian people as a result of miscegenation under the Golden Horde. He described the Slavs as "a stagnant marsh in which all superior ethnic strains after a few hours of triumph found themselves engulfed".

=== Chinese civilization ===
Gobineau argued Chinese civilization had been created by a group of Aryan conquerors from India who had brought the indigenous Malay people living there under their heel. Though he had read almost everything written in French about China, he believed the origins of Chinese civilization were in southern China. He posited the Aryans from India had first arrived there rather than the Yellow River valley which all Chinese sources regard as the "cradle" of Chinese civilization.

He argued Chinese culture was "without beauty and dignity"; the Chinese were "lacking in sentiments beyond the humblest notion of physical utility", and Chinese Confucianism was a "resume of practices and maxims strongly reminiscent of what the moralists of Geneva and their educational books are pleased to recommend as the nec plus ultra ("ultimate") of the good: economy, moderation, prudence, the art of making a profit and never a loss".

All Chinese literature was "puerile", according to Gobineau, as the Chinese lacked the powers of the imagination that allowed Westerners to write great novels. He considered Chinese theater "flat" and Chinese poetry "ridiculous". The "great Chinese scientific works" were "verbose compilations" lacking in the analytic rigor, which according to him whites alone were capable of achieving. He asserted the Chinese were incapable of science because "the spirit of the yellow race is neither profound nor insightful to attain this quality [scientific excellence] reserved for the white race". Gobineau believed China was a warning to the West of the perils of "democracy"—by which he meant meritocracy. This was because the Chinese state had attempted to promote education for the masses, the rule by the mandarins was meritocratic, and the exams to become a mandarin were open to all literate men. For Gobineau this reflected the racially "stagnant" character of the Chinese.

==== "Yellow Peril" ====
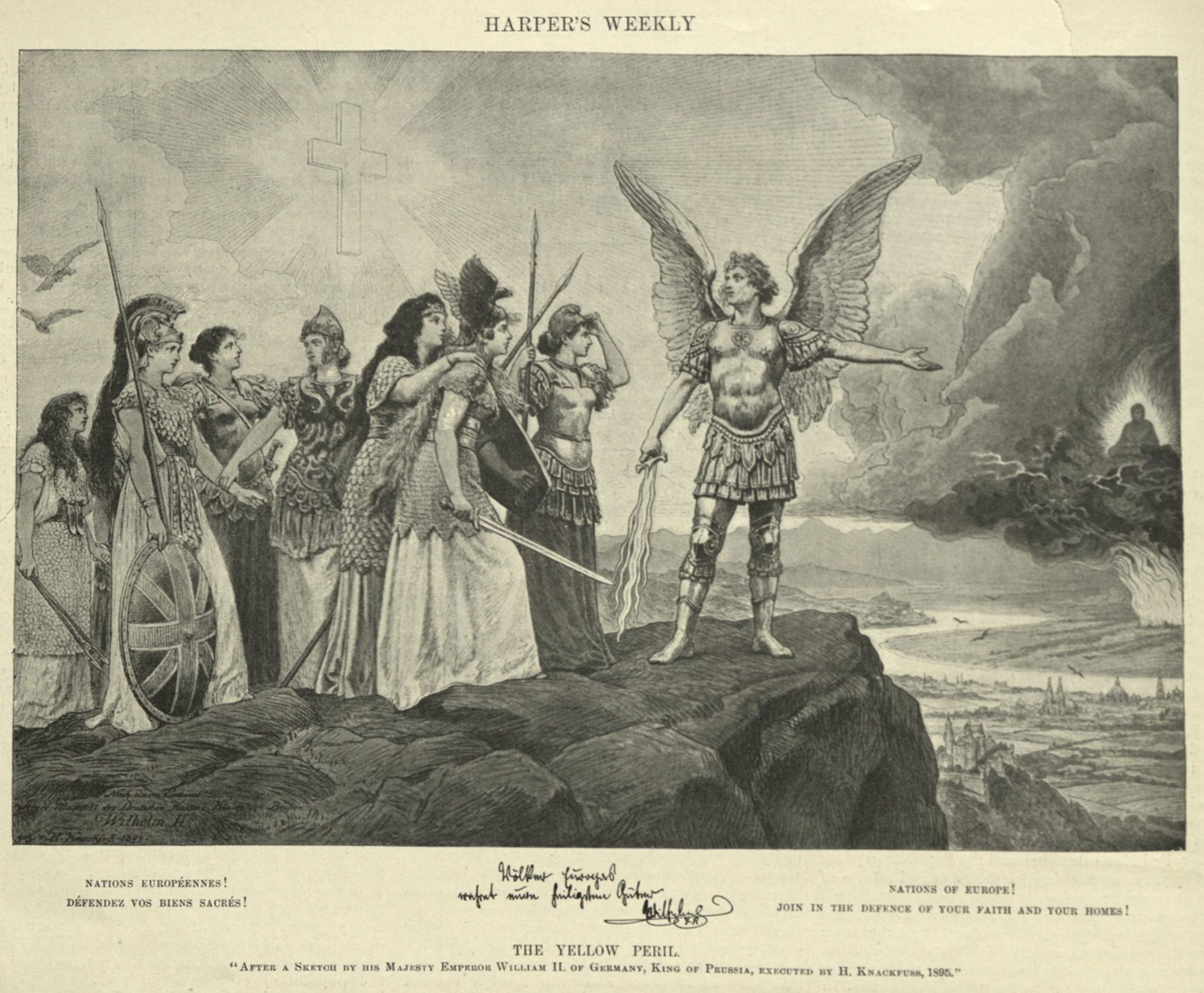
Völker Europas, wahrt eure heiligsten Güter ("Peoples of Europe, guard your dearest goods," 1895) The Yellow Peril painting. Much of the imagery appears drawn from Gobineau's anti-Asian writings, via his friend Prince Philip von Eulenburg who helped with turning Wilhelm II's sketch into the painting.

In the last years of his life Gobineau was consumed with the fear of what was later to be known as the "Yellow Peril". He believed European civilization would soon be destroyed by a Chinese invasion. Linked to his fear of China was Gobineau's fear of Russia. During his visit to Russia in 1876 he wrote to a friend: "It is undeniable that this country is well on the way to power and aggrandizement" and in 1879 wrote Russia was about to present "the spectacle of the creation of the greatest empire that the Universe will ever have seen". He saw the growth of Russian power as opening the door for a Chinese invasion of Europe, writing to Pedro II in 1879:

What the Russians will have done within ten years will be to have opened towards the West the flood-gates to the vast human horde that we find so ill at ease in China; and it is an avalanche of Chinese and Slavs, mottled with Tartars and Baltic Germans, that will put an end to the stupidities and indeed to the civilization of Europe. The United States, which fears a yellow invasion from the direction of California, will gain little from all this. Europe will lose everything!

In 1881, Gobineau published an article in Richard Wagner's newspaper the Bayreuther Blätter entitled "Ein Urteil über die jetzige Weltlage" ("A Judgment on the Present World"), which was translated into German by Cosima Wagner. With a foreword by Wagner himself, Gobineau here warned the Chinese would soon overwhelm and destroy Western civilization. Gobineau also called his essay Ce qui se fait en Asie ("What is Happening in Asia") "the sequel and the present condition of the Essai". Gobineau praised racist laws meant to restrict Chinese immigration to the United States, Canada, New Zealand, Hawaii and Australia as a good first step, but warned that "European civilization" was so rotten by miscegenation that it was only a matter of time before the Chinese destroyed the West.

In 1884, the French efforts to conquer Vietnam led to war breaking out between France and China. The Sino-French War led to immediate revival of interest in Gobineau's anti-Asian writings in France. Several French newspapers reprinted the French original of Gobineau's 1881 article in the Bayreuther Blätter warning about the imminent Chinese threat to European civilization. Likewise, the Franco-Chinese war led to the Essai sur l'inégalité des races humaines becoming popular in France. The book had been published in four volumes (each about 1,000 pages long) in 1853–55, and remained out of print for decades. In 1884, just after the war with China began, the second and third editions of the Essai sur l'inégalité des races humaines were published in Paris. This was a direct result of the war, as many French people suddenly became interested in a book that portrayed such an unflattering picture of Asians.

== Legacy and influence ==
=== Romania ===
Gobineau's theories were a major influence on the Romanian radical anti-Semitic politician Professor A. C. Cuza, who embraced his biological racism as a way of "proving" the Jews were a "plague" upon modern Romanian life. Like most of Gobineau's followers, Cuza rejected his pessimism as too extreme, but he argued that Romanian people formed out of a fusion between the ancient Dacians and Romans had best preserved the Aryan blood, and that the Jews as a biologically different people simply did not belong in Romania. Cuza, who was deeply impressed with Gobineau, often used his theories and rhetoric of racial degeneration to frame his anti-Semitic arguments about the "Jewish race". Cuza frequently described the Jews were a "plague" upon Romania. He asserted the Romanian people were in the midst of the sort of racial degeneration described by Gobineau, which for Cuza was caused by the Jews. At various times Cuza had been a mentor to various figures on the Romanian radical right such as Corneliu Zelea Codreanu, the poet-politician Octavian Goga and Marshal Ion Antonescu; his influence was considerable in 1930s–40s Romania.

=== Ottoman Empire ===
Gobineau's theories had a profound influence on the Committee of Union and Progress (CUP). The Turks had originated from the land north of the Great Wall of China and migrated across Eurasia to Anatolia. Committee members called the homeland of the Turks Turan and identified themselves with Gobineau's Aryans. He was often mentioned in CUP journals and in 1911 a journal dedicated to promoting the CUP's take on Gobineau was founded in Salonika.

=== Germany ===
Historians have described Gobinism as becoming cult-like by the end of the nineteenth century, with powerful and influential followers, specifically in the Pan-Germanism movement. The Gobineau Association (Gobineau-Vereinigung) was founded in 1894 by Ludwig Schemann, who also made the first German translation of Gobineau's An Essay on the Inequality of the Human Races.

Becoming popular in German intellectual cliques, particularly the Bayreuth Circle, in the phenomena that Walter Charles Langer described as "Gobineau Societies", Gobinism was later adapted by the likes of Houston Stewart Chamberlain and Alfred Rosenberg to forge elements of Nazi philosophy. Gobineau's antisemitism was emphasized within Gobinism to ideologically bridge to the later Nazi movement.

Historians have made much of the significant philosophical gap between the pessimism of Gobineau himself, particularly his insistence that his vision was of mythical Aryans as a fallen and lost people, versus the optimism and themes of rejuvenation of the disciples and members of the Gobinism movement. It has been suggested that the spawning of Gobinism went on to majorly influence all future racial theories of the period. Nietzsche's Übermensch was largely inspired by the movement. Some historians believe the influence of Gobinism was still affecting racial discourse into the mid-20th-century.

Richard Wagner wrote positively about Gobineau in his late writings and suggested one could not exclude the correctness of his racial theory. At the same time, he also disagreed with Gobineau's conclusion that miscegenation unavoidably resulted in the decline of the human race and cultures. In his 1881 article Heldentum und Christentum ("Heroism and Christianity"), Wagner praised the Essai, and accepted its premise of an Aryan master race and its denunciation of miscegenation, but he denied humanity was in unstoppable decay. He thought that Christ died for everyone, irrespective of race, and from this drew a hope for a fundamental regeneration of humanity based on acceptance of Christianity. Gobineau visited Bayreuth, the home of Wagner, shortly before his death.

In 1894, the Wagnerite and anti-Semitic journalist Ludwig Schemann founded the Gobineau Vereinigung (Gobineau Society) to promote Gobineau's theories in Germany, spawning the Gobinism movement. Schemann was close to Cosima Wagner and was inspired by her to found the Gobineau Vereinigung. It was a small group, but it exercised much intellectual influence, and in this way popularized the theory of an Aryan master-race in Germany. The Gobineauismus that Schemann and the Gobineau Vereinigung promoted owed as much to Wagner as it did to Gobineau for the group rejected Gobineau's pessimism and believed the Aryan race could be saved. Schemann, who was one of the most influential and best known race theorists in Imperial Germany, projected an optimistic message about the future of the Aryan race while accepting Gobineau's basic idea about an Aryan master race. Schemann was the man who popularized Gobineau in Germany and it was largely through him, rather than reading the Essai directly, that Gobineauismus was promoted in the Reich. In 1937, Schemann was personally awarded the Goethe Medal by Hitler for his "services to the nation and race".

==== Influence on Nazism ====
Adolf Hitler and Nazism borrowed much of Gobineau's ideology. However, although a central figure in the development of degeneration theory, Gobineau was not antisemitic. He may be characterised as philosemitic, having written very positively about Jewish people, including a long eulogy to them in his Essai sur l'inégalité des races, describing them as "a free, strong, and intelligent people" who succeeded despite the natural disadvantages of the Land of Israel. In his later years, however, he inclined, according to Paul Lawrence Rose, toward "a vague personal antisemitism."

When the Nazis adopted Gobineau's theories, they edited his work extensively to make it conform to their views, much as they did in the case of Nietzsche. Extracts from the Essai were mandatory reading in German schools under the Third Reich. Gobineau's fundamental pessimism with the best days of the Aryans long gone was of little use to völkisch ("ethnic") thinkers. Several of them such as Houston Stewart Chamberlain did borrow Gobineau's idea about an Aryan master race. The American historian Paul Fortier observed it was striking the contrast between the fundamental optimism and triumphant tone expressed by Chamberlain in his 1899 book The Foundations of the 19th Century about the future of the Aryans vs. the relentlessly downbeat and gloomy message of Gobineau's Essai. Writing in April 1939, Rowbotham declared: "So after nearly a hundred years, the fantastic pessimistic philosophy of the brilliant French diplomat is seized upon and twisted to the use of a mystic demagogue who finds in the idea of the pure Aryan an excuse for thrusting civilization dangerously near back to the Dark Ages." The pessimism of Gobineau's message did not lend itself to political action as he did not believe that humanity could be saved from racial degeneration. Biddiss wrote:

His racist ideology, through rooted in social and political concerns and though claiming to explain the nature of society itself, could not on his own terms effect any transformation. But Gobineau unfortunately failed to realize the degree to which such a theory—whatever his own view of its impotence—might be capable of use and adaptation by others to affect society and history. His work would in time be plundered by racists with an interest in preaching explicitly reformatory doctrines.

=== Brazil ===
Despite his highly negative assessment of Brazilians, Gobineau became a hero to certain Brazilian intellectuals. In a 1906 essay, the intellectual Sílvio Romero cited Gobineau together with Otto Ammon, Georges Vacher de Lapouge and Houston Stewart Chamberlain as having proved that the blond dolichocephalic (long skulled) people of northern Europe were the best and greatest race in the entire world. He wrote that Brazil could become a great nation by having a huge influx of German immigrants who would achieve the embranquecimento (racial whitening) of Brazil. In 1912, Romero praised Gobineau in an essay for "admirable, genius-like vision" and his "wise words that merit every consideration" before launching what the American historian Thomas Skidmore called a "violent polemic" against Brazil's mulatto population as a racially degenerate people who should disappear from Brazil.

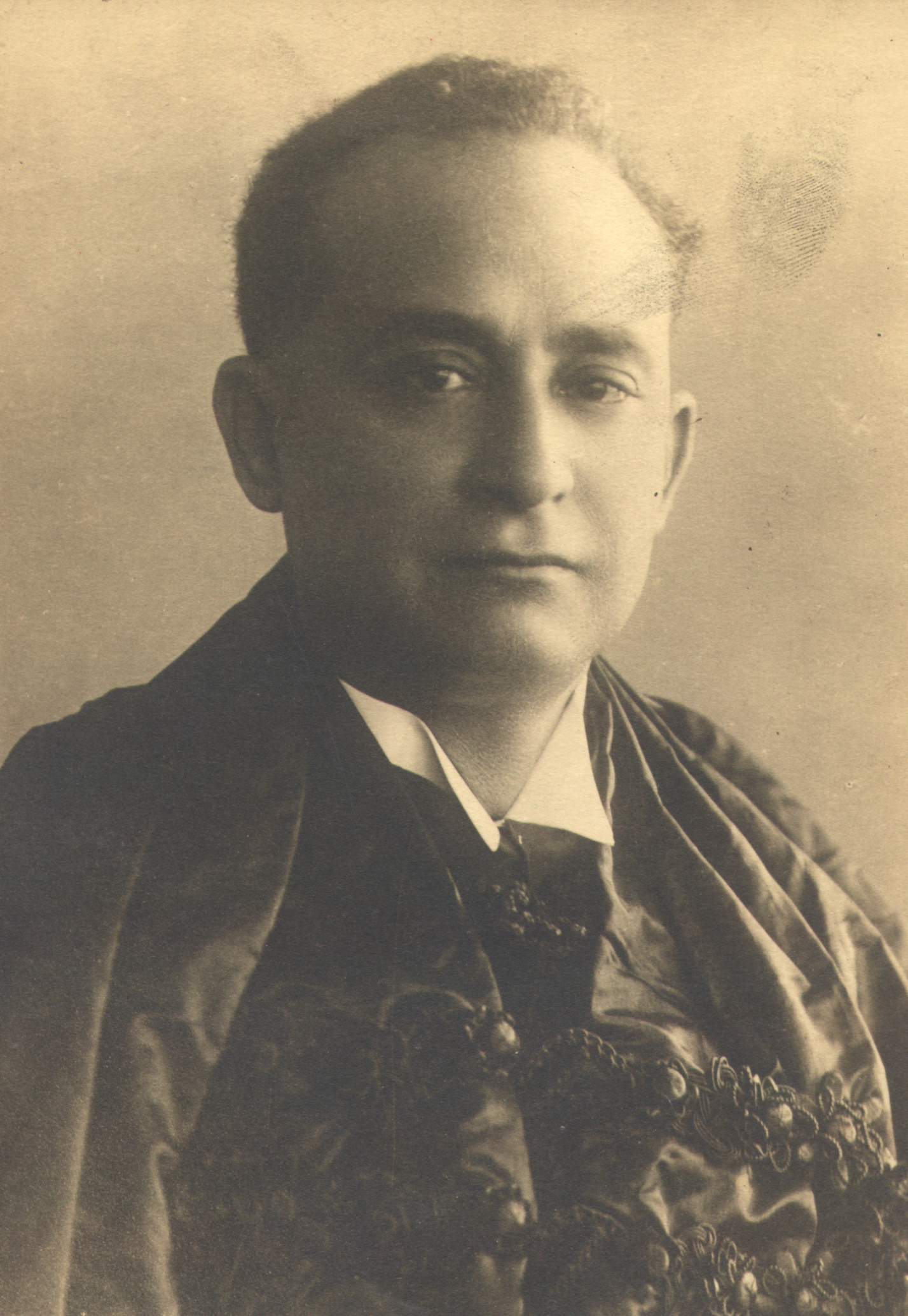
Oliveira Viana (pictured), a Brazilian minister, was highly influenced by Gobineau's racist beliefs

Oliveira Viana in his 1920 book As populações meridionais do Brasil ("The Southern Populations of Brazil") offered lavish praise of Gobineau for his denunciation of miscegenation and his disparaging remarks about black and Indian Brazilians. Vianna's solution was a plan to "Aryanise" Brazil by bringing in millions of fair-skinned European immigrants and thus achieve the "embranquecimento" of Brazil. Vianna served as the education minister under the dictatorship of Getúlio Vargas, where he was well known for his advocacy of the advantages of "Aryan" immigration to Brazil.

Until the Second World War, Gobineau's writings were cited in Brazil in support of the idea that miscegenation caused "physical degeneration" and there must be no interracial sex in Brazil if the Brazilian people were to have a positive future. By contrast, in reaction to intellectuals like Vianna who cited Gobineau, the Brazilian writer Gilberto Freyre wrote a series of books in the 1920s–30s praising miscegenation and the black Brazilian culture, arguing that the fusion of white, black and Indians had given Brazil a distinctive culture and the Brazilian people a distinctive appearance, creating the theory of Lusotropicalism. Freyre argued that Gobineau was a snobbish Frenchman who looked down upon Brazilians as not measuring up to Europe. This led Freyre to reject the idea that Europe should be the standard for Brazil, arguing the Brazilians had created a new civilization based on an interaction of the descendants of Indians, African slaves and European immigrants that was superior to the Europeans with their obsession with racial purity. Freyre dismissed the writings of Gobineau and Chamberlain as "diffuse, loquacious and wrong".

=== Baháʼí Faith ===
Although in no way espousing his beliefs, the Baháʼí Faith recognizes Gobineau as the person who obtained the only complete manuscript of the early history of the Bábí religious movement of Persia, written by Hajji Mirzâ Jân of Kashan, who was put to death by the Persian authorities in c. 1852. The manuscript is held by the Bibliothèque Nationale at Paris. He is also known to students of Babism for having written the first and most influential account of the movement, displaying a fairly accurate knowledge of its history in Les religions et philosophies dans l'asie centrale (1900). An addendum to that work is a bad translation of the Bab's Bayan al-'Arabi, the first Babi text to be translated into a European language.

== Sources ==
- Akçam, Taner (2006). A Shameful Act – The Armenian Genocide and the Question of Turkish Responsibility. New York, NY: Metropolitan. ISBN 978-0805079326.
- Bell, Richard H. (2013). Wagner's Parsifal: An Appreciation in the Light of His Theological Journey. Cascade Books.
- Biddiss, Michael D. (1970). Father of Racist Ideology: The Social and Political Thought of Count Gobineau. Littlehampton Book Services Ltd. ISBN 978-0297000853.
- Biddiss, Michael D. (1997). "History as Destiny: Gobineau, H. S. Chamberlain and Spengler". Transactions of the Royal Historical Society. 7: 73–100. doi:10.2307/3679271. JSTOR 3679271. S2CID 163004517.
- Blue, Gregory (1999). "Gobineau on China: Race Theory, the "Yellow Peril" and the Critique of Modernity"". Journal of World History. 10 (1): 93–139. doi:10.1353/jwh.2005.0003. JSTOR 20078751. S2CID 143762514.
- Bucur, Maria (2010). Eugenics and Modernization in Interwar Romania. Pittsburgh, PA: University of Pittsburgh Press. ISBN 978-0822961260.
- Budil, Ivo (2008). Arthur Gobineau and Greece. A view of a man of letters and diplomat. Prague Papers on the History of International Relations.
- Burke, Peter; Pallares-Burke, Maria Lúcia (2008). Gilberto Freyre: Social Theory in the Tropics. New York, NY: Peter Lang Ltd. ISBN 978-1906165093.
- Drayton, Richard (2011). "Gilberto Freyre and the Twentieth-Century Rethinking of Race in Latin America". Portuguese Studies. 27 (1): 43–47. doi:10.5699/portstudies.27.1.0043. JSTOR 10.5699/portstudies.27.1.0043. S2CID 161917205.
- Drummond, Elizabeth (2005). "Schemann, Ludwig (1852–1938)". In Levy, Richard S. (ed.). Antisemitism A Historical Encyclopedia of Prejudice and Persecution. Santa Barbara, CA: ABC-CLIO. ISBN 978-1-85109-439-4.
- Field, Geoffrey G. (1981). Evangelist of race : The Germanic Vision of Houston Stewart Chamberlain. New York: Columbia University Press. ISBN 0-231-04860-2.
- Fortier, Paul (Autumn 1967). "Gobineau and German Racism". Comparative Literature. 19 (4): 341–350. doi:10.2307/1769493. JSTOR 1769493.
- Irwin, Robert (2016). Gobineau the Would be Orientalist. Vol. 26. The Journal of the Royal Asiatic Society.
- Magee, Bryan (2002). The Tristan Chord. New York: Owl Books. ISBN 0-8050-7189-X. (UK title: Wagner and Philosophy, Penguin Books, ISBN 0-14-029519-4)
- Rowbotham, Arnold (1939). "Gobineau and the Aryan Terror". The Sewanee Review. 47 (2): 152–165. JSTOR 27535529.
- Skidmore, Thomas E. (1993). Black into White: Race and Nationality in Brazilian Thought. Durham, NC: Duke University Press. ISBN 978-0822313205.
