= Gobineau Association =

German völkisch organisation (est. 1894)

- Gobineau-Vereinigung
- Formation: February 12, 1904; 122 years ago
- Dissolved: c. 1920
- Purpose: Translation and promotion of Arthur de Gobineau's works Promotion of racial theory, eugenics and Rassenhygiene
- Headquarters: Freiburg im Breisgau
- Members: 360 (1914)
- Official language: German
- Chairman: Ludwig Schemann

The Gobineau Association (Gobineau-Vereinigung) was a German völkisch organisation founded in 1894 by Ludwig Schemann to promote the racial theories of Arthur de Gobineau. Under Schemann’s sole direction it evolved from a scholarly translation project into a major financial and networking hub of the pre-1918 völkisch movement, linking Wagnerism, pan-Germanism, antisemitism, and early racial hygiene. It effectively functioned as Schemann’s personal ideological enterprise until its dissolution around 1920.

== History ==
=== Background ===
Ludwig Schemann (1852–1938) was a German independent scholar and racial ideologue. After an unsuccessful attempt at an academic career and a brief stint as a university librarian in Göttingen, he lived from 1891 onward as a privatgelehrter in Freiburg im Breisgau, supported by his wife’s family fortune. An early Wagner enthusiast with close ties to the Bayreuth Circle (especially Cosima Wagner and Hans von Wolzogen) and deeply influenced by Paul de Lagarde's anti-modern, antiliberal, and antisemitic nationalism, Schemann combined Lagarde’s cultural pessimism with a full embrace of biological racism and the racial theories of Arthur de Gobineau. In 1894, encouraged by Cosima Wagner and Gobineau’s literary executrix Mathilde de La Tour, he founded the Gobineau-Vereinigung. What began as a project to translate and publish Gobineau's works quickly became Schemann’s personal platform for promoting an activist, Germanised version of racial doctrine and one of the most important networking and funding instruments of the pre-1918 völkisch movement.

=== Activities ===
Schemann's primary activity was the systematic reworking of Arthur de Gobineau's writings for a German audience. Between 1894 and 1916 he produced the first complete German translation of Gobineau's An Essay on the Inequality of the Human Races, a multi-volume edition of selected works, an extensive collection of sources, a biography (1909), and numerous commentaries. Far from faithful reproduction, Schemann deliberately "Germanised" Gobineau: he downplayed the Frenchman’s fatalism and Catholic leanings, stripped away the original pessimism, and reformulate the racial theory in an activist, heroic-Germanic mould compatible with völkisch optimism and antisemitic agitation. Gobineau was presented as a spiritual precursor of Richard Wagner and as an honorary "German" thinker whose ideas culminated in the mission of the Germanic race. The two most influential publications appeared in 1910: Gobineaus Rassenwerk (a scholarly-sounding synthesis intended to lend academic legitimacy) and Gobineau und die deutsche Kultur (an overtly propagandistic tract, printed in an initial run of 3,000 copies, which explicitly addressed the völkisch public and urged the adoption of racial hygiene as the logical consequence of Gobineau's doctrine.).

Initially sustained by the Bayreuth Circle and personal friends of Gobineau, the society stagnated at around 120 members until the late 1890s. From 1900 onward Schemann aggressively courted the Pan-German League (Alldeutscher Verband) and other radical-nationalist organisations. By 1914 membership had risen to approximately 360 individual and corporate members, including high nobility (Grand Duchess Elisabeth of Oldenburg, Grand Duke Ernst Ludwig of Hesse, Prince Eulenburg-Hertefeld), leading Pan-Germans and antisemites (Heinrich Claß, Max Liebermann von Sonnenberg, Theodor Fritsch, Ernst zu Reventlow), publishers and propagandists (Julius Friedrich Lehmann, Philipp Stauff) and early racial hygienists (Alfred Ploetz, Wilhelm Schallmayer).

=== World War I and dissolution ===
During the World War I the Association reached its peak of activity and influence. Schemann enthusiastically supported annexationist war aims, unrestricted submarine warfare, and the ideological mobilisation of the home front. Thousands of copies of his Gobineau translations and commentaries were distributed free of charge to soldiers, officers’ libraries, and schools, often financed directly by the society or by sympathetic Pan-German donors. Despite wartime inflation and paper shortages, membership remained stable at around 360 and income was higher than ever.

After the German defeat in 1918 and the November Revolution, Schemann regarded the Weimar Republic as the triumph of everything he had fought against. Although the association continued formally until 1920 and recorded its highest revenues in the 1917–1919 period, he decided to liquidate it, citing poor health and the chaotic post-war economy. In reality, by the early 1920s Schemann no longer needed the organisation: his personal wealth had grown substantially, his reputation within radical-nationalist circles was secure, and the networks he had built migrated to newer, more overtly political formations such as the Deutschvölkischer Schutz- und Trutzbund and the early Nazi Party.

A short-lived attempt to refound the society in the mid-1920s, following a Pan-German League congress, quickly foundered. The Gobineau Association thus effectively ceased to exist around 1920, having served for more than a quarter-century as one of the most important financial, publishing, and networking instruments of the pre-war völkisch movement. Its ideological legacy (above all the activist and antisemitic reinterpretation of Gobineau) continued to circulate in Nazi circles, and in 1937 Schemann himself was awarded the Goethe-Medaille für Kunst und Wissenschaft by Adolf Hitler in recognition of his "services to völkisch scholarship".
