= Wagnerism =

Wagnerism may refer to:

- Composer Richard Wagner's philosophical and artistic ideals
  - Houston Stewart Chamberlain, called the "Champion of Wagnerism"
  - Wagner controversies
- Richard Wagner's style of music, for example, Alberto Franchetti
- Wagnerianism and Czech National Identity, 1870 writing by Czech historian and musicologist Otakar Hostinský
- a form of adversarial labour union legislation represented by the Wagner Act in the United States
- Wagnerism: Art and Politics in the Shadow of Music (2020), book by music critic Alex Ross
