= Controversies surrounding Richard Wagner =

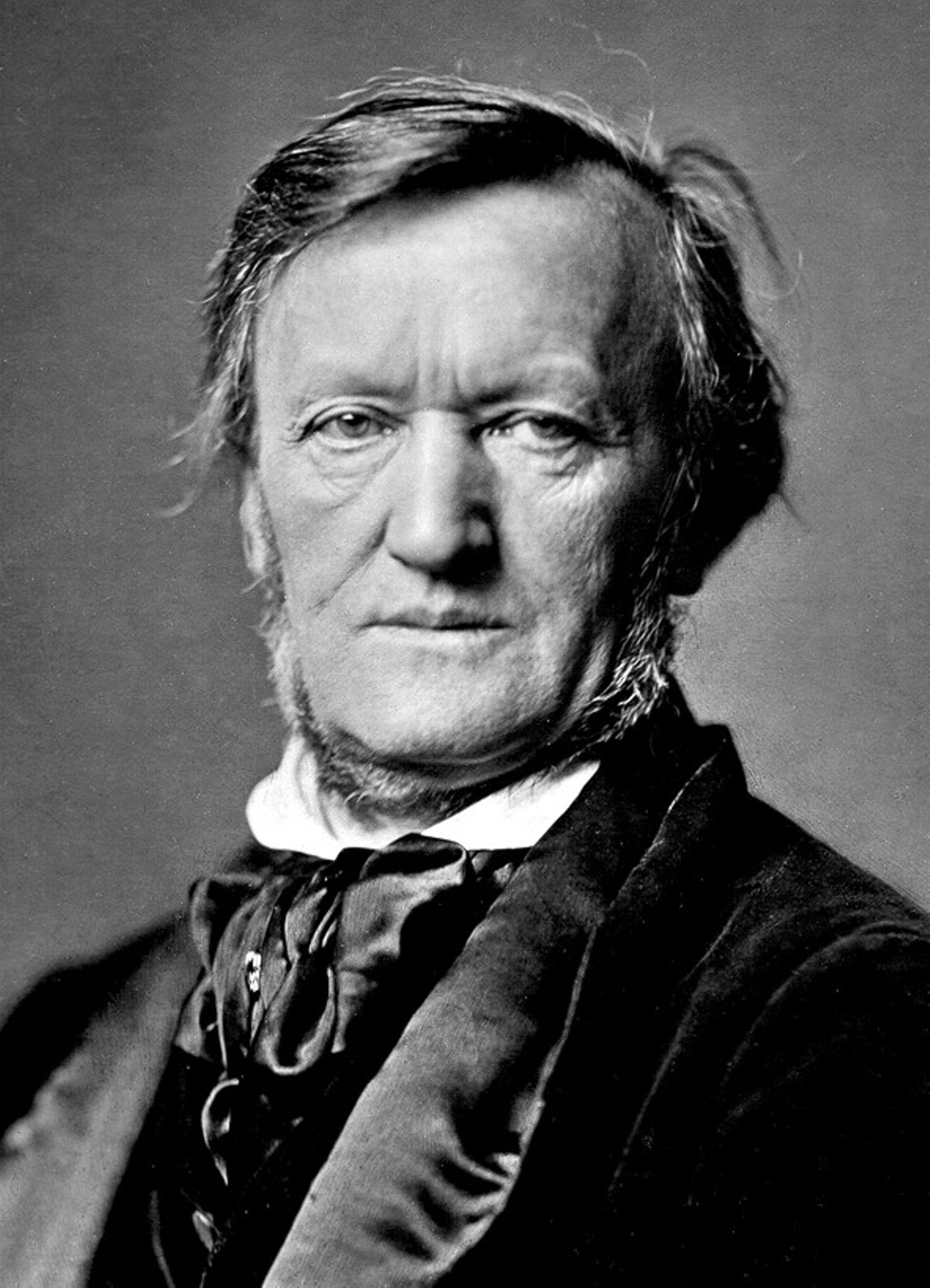
Richard Wagner

The German composer Richard Wagner (1813–1883) was a controversial figure during his lifetime, and has continued to be so after his death. Even today he is associated in the minds of many with Nazism and his operas are often thought to extol the virtues of German nationalism. The writer and Wagner scholar Bryan Magee has written:

I sometimes think there are two Wagners in our culture, almost unrecognizably different from one another: the Wagner possessed by those who know his work, and the Wagner imagined by those who know him only by name and reputation.

Most of these perceptions arise from Wagner's published opinions on a number of topics. Wagner was a prolific writer who published essays and pamphlets on a wide range of subjects throughout his life. Several of his writings have achieved some notoriety, in particular, his essay Das Judenthum in der Musik (Judaism in Music), a critical view on the influence of Jews in German culture and society at that time. Whether Wagner's operas contain adverse caricatures of Jews or not is a controversial matter among scholars.

Wagner was promoted during the Nazi era as one of Adolf Hitler's favourite composers. Historical perception of Wagner has been tainted with this association ever since, and there is debate over how Wagner's writings and operas might have influenced the creation of Nazi Germany.

There is also controversy over both the beginning and the end of Wagner's life – his paternity and his death. It is suggested that he was the son of Ludwig Geyer, rather than his legal father Carl Friedrich Wagner, and some of his biographers have proposed that Wagner himself believed that Geyer was Jewish. A belief also exists that his fatal heart attack followed an argument with his wife Cosima over the singer Carrie Pringle, with whom some claim he had an amorous relationship.

== Paternity ==
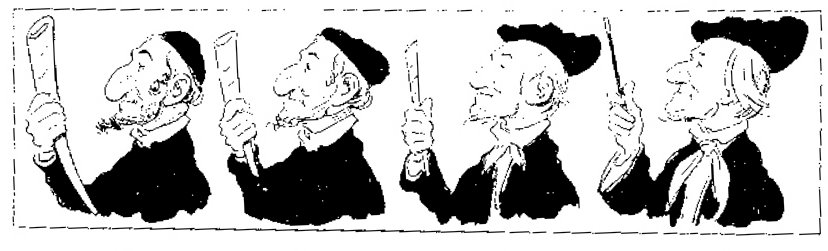
Caricature, entitled Darwinian Evolution, by T. Zajacskowski in the Viennese satirical magazine, Der Floh, c. 1875. The suggestion is that Wagner descends from the orthodox Jew (left) who is holding a shofar, while Wagner wields a baton.

Richard Wagner was born on 22 May 1813, the ninth child of Carl Friedrich Wagner, a clerk in the Leipzig police service, and Johanna Rosine Wagner. Wagner's father died of typhus six months after Richard's birth, by which time Wagner's mother was living with the actor and playwright Ludwig Geyer in the Brühl, at that time the Jewish quarter of Leipzig. Johanna and Geyer married in August 1814, and for the first 14 years of his life, Wagner was known as Wilhelm Richard Geyer. Wagner in his later years discovered letters from Geyer to his mother which led him to suspect that Geyer was, in fact, his biological father, and furthermore speculated that Geyer was Jewish. According to Cosima's diaries (26 December 1868) Wagner "did not believe" that Ludwig Geyer was his real father. At the same time Cosima noted a resemblance between Wagner's son Siegfried and Geyer. The philosopher Friedrich Nietzsche was one of Wagner's closest acolytes, and proof-read Wagner's autobiography Mein Leben (My Life). It may have been this closeness that led Nietzsche to claim in his 1888 book Der Fall Wagner (The Case of Wagner) that Wagner's father was Geyer, and to make the pun that "Ein Geyer ist beinahe schon ein Adler" (A vulture is almost an eagle) —Geyer also being the German word for "vulture" and Adler being both a very common surname among Jews and the German word for "eagle". Despite these conjectures on the part of Wagner and Nietzsche, there is no evidence that Geyer was Jewish, and the question of Wagner's paternity is unlikely to be settled without DNA evidence.

== Death ==
According to Wagner scholar Stewart Spencer, the frequent allegation that Wagner had an affair with the singer Carrie Pringle, and that an argument about this affair with his wife Cosima precipitated Wagner's fatal heart attack is an invention, for which there is no first-hand or documentary evidence.

== Antisemitism ==
Prior to 1850 (when he was 37), there is no record of Wagner expressing any particular antisemitic sentiment. Wagner's first and most controversial essay on the subject was Das Judenthum in der Musik (Jewishness in Music), originally published under the pen-name K. Freigedank (K. Freethought) in 1850 in the Neue Zeitschrift für Musik. In a previous issue, music critic Theodor Uhlig had attacked the success in Paris of Meyerbeer's Le prophète (1849), and Wagner's essay expanded this to an attack on supposed 'Jewishness' in all German art. The essay purported to explain popular dislike of Jewish composers, particularly Mendelssohn and Meyerbeer, the latter of whom is not mentioned by name but is clearly a target. Wagner wrote that the German people were repelled by Jews due to their 'alien' appearance and behaviour: "with all our speaking and writing in favour of the Jews’ emancipation, we always felt instinctively repelled by any actual, operative contact with them." He argued that Jewish musicians were only capable of producing music that was shallow and artificial because they had no connection to the genuine spirit of the German people.

In the conclusion to the essay, he wrote of the Jews that "only one thing can redeem you from the burden of your curse: the redemption of Ahasuerus — going under!" Some commentators have taken this to mean actual physical annihilation. Wagner advises Jews to follow the example of Jewish convert to Protestantism Ludwig Börne by abandoning Judaism. In this way Jews will take part in "this regenerative work of deliverance through self-annulment; then are we one and un-dissevered!" Wagner was, therefore, calling for the assimilation of Jews into mainstream German culture and society—although there can be little doubt, from the words he uses in the essay, that this call was prompted at least as much by antisemitism as by a desire for social amelioration. (In the very first publication, the word here translated as "self-annulment" was represented by the phrase "self-annihilating, bloody struggle").

The initial publication of the article attracted little attention, but Wagner wrote a self-justifying letter about it to Franz Liszt in 1851, claiming that his "long-suppressed resentment against this Jewish business" was "as necessary to me as gall is to the blood". Wagner republished the pamphlet under his own name in 1869, with an extended introduction, leading to several public protests at the first performances of Die Meistersinger von Nürnberg. Wagner repeated similar views in later articles, such as "What is German?" (1878, but based on a draft written in the 1860s), and Cosima Wagner's diaries often recorded his comments about "Jews". Although many have argued that his aim was to promote the integration of Jews into society by suppressing their Jewishness, others have interpreted the final words of the 1850 pamphlet (suggesting the solution of an Untergang for the Jews, an ambiguous word, literally 'decline' or 'downfall' but which can also mean 'sinking' or 'going to a doom') as meaning that Wagner wished the Jewish people to be destroyed.

Some biographers, such as Theodor Adorno and Robert Gutman, have advanced the claim that Wagner's opposition to Jews was not limited to his articles, and that the operas contained such messages. In particular, the characters of Mime in the Ring, Klingsor in Parsifal, and Sixtus Beckmesser in Die Meistersinger are supposedly Jewish stereotypes. However, none of them is identified as Jewish in the libretto. Such claims are disputed. Wagner, over the course of his life, produced a huge amount of written material analyzing every aspect of himself, including his operas and his views on Jews (as well as many other topics); these purportedly 'Jewish' characterizations are never mentioned, nor are there any such references in Cosima Wagner's copious diaries.

Other scholars dispute any antisemitic characterization in the operas. Katz opines that the antisemitism of Wagner should not be used as the key to interpret his art: "In fact, without forced speculation, very little in the artistic work of Wagner can be related to his attitude toward Jews and Judaism." Milton E. Brener notes that the dwarves in Wagner's works (such as Alberich and Mime in the Ring), frequently interpreted to be (negative) representations of Jewishness, were not seen as such by Wagner himself, as evidence found in Cosima's diaries shows. Alberich represents "the naiveté of the non-Christian world". During a vacation after Parsifal, when the couple discussed the dwarves "from the view of race", they thought about "yellow (Mongols)". In 1881, Wagner showed his surprise at the fact that a Jewish actor (Julius Lieban) was chosen to play a dwarf (Mime) in Siegfried.

Despite his published views on Jewishness, Wagner maintained Jewish friends and colleagues throughout his life. One of the most notable of these was Hermann Levi, a practising Jew and son of a rabbi, whose talent was freely acknowledged by Wagner. Levi's position as Kapellmeister at Munich meant he was to conduct the premiere of Parsifal, Wagner's last opera. Wagner initially objected to this and was quoted as saying Levi should be baptized before conducting Parsifal. Levi, however, held Wagner in adulation and was asked to be a pallbearer at the composer's funeral.

== Allegations of racism ==
Some biographers have asserted that Wagner in his final years came to believe in the Aryanist philosophy of Arthur de Gobineau. However the influence of Gobineau on Wagner's thought is debated. Wagner was first introduced to Gobineau in person in Rome in November 1876. The two did not cross paths again until 1880, well after Wagner had completed the libretto for Parsifal, the opera most often accused of containing racist ideology. Although Gobineau's An Essay on the Inequality of the Human Races was written 25 years earlier, it seems that Wagner did not read it until October 1880 (although the phrase “Entartet Geschlecht” at the start of Tristan und Isolde suggests awareness of the essay's concepts soon after its initial publication). There is evidence to suggest that Wagner was very interested in Gobineau's idea that Western society was doomed because of miscegenation between "superior" and "inferior" races. However, he does not seem to have subscribed to any belief in the superiority of the supposed Germanic or "Nordic race".

Wagner's conversations with Gobineau during the philosopher's 5-week stay at Wahnfried in 1881 were punctuated with frequent arguments. Cosima Wagner's diary entry for June 3 recounts one exchange in which Wagner "positively exploded in favour of Christianity as compared to racial theory." Gobineau also believed that in order to have musical ability, one must have black ancestry.

Wagner subsequently wrote three essays in response to Gobineau's ideas: Introduction to a Work of Count Gobineau, Know Thyself, and Heroism and Christianity (all 1881). The Introduction is a short piece written for the Bayreuther Blätter in which Wagner praises the Count's book:

We asked Count Gobineau, returned from weary, knowledge-laden wanderings among far distant lands and peoples, what he thought of the present aspect of the world; to-day we give his answer to our readers. He, too, had peered into an Inner: he proved the blood in modern manhood's veins, and found it tainted past all healing.

In "Know Thyself" Wagner deals with the German people, who Gobineau believes are the "superior" Aryan race. Wagner, in fact, rejects the notion that the Germans are a race at all and further proposes that we should look past the notion of race to focus on the human qualities ("das Reinmenschliche") common to all of us. In "Heroism and Christianity", Wagner proposes that Christianity could function to provide a moral harmonization of all races, preferable to the physical unification of races by miscegenation:

Incomparably fewer in individual numbers than the lower races, the ruin of the white races may be referred to their having been obliged to mix with them; whereby, as remarked already, they suffered more from the loss of their purity than the others could gain by the ennobling of their blood [...] To us Equality is only thinkable as based upon a universal moral concord, such as we can but deem true Christianity elect to bring about.

Wagner's concerns over miscegenation occupied him until the very end of his life; he was in the process of writing another essay, On the Womanly in the Human Race (1883), at the time of his death, in which he discusses the role of marriage in the creation of races: "it is certain that the noblest white race is monogamic at its first appearance in saga and history, but marches toward its downfall through polygamy with the races which it conquers."

Wagner's son-in-law Houston Stewart Chamberlain expanded on Wagner and Gobineau's ideas in his 1899 book The Foundations of the Nineteenth Century, a racist work extolling the Aryan ideal that later strongly influenced Adolf Hitler's ideas on race.

== Nazi appropriation ==
About the time of Wagner's death, European nationalist movements were losing the Romantic, idealistic egalitarianism of 1848, and acquiring tints of militarism and aggression, due in no small part to Bismarck's takeover and unification of Germany in 1871. After Wagner's death in 1883, Bayreuth increasingly became a focus for German nationalists attracted by the mythos of the operas, who have been referred to by later commentators as the Bayreuth Circle. This group was endorsed by Cosima Wagner, whose antisemitism was considerably less complex and more virulent than Richard's. One member of the circle was Houston Stewart Chamberlain, the author of a number of 'philosophic' tracts which later became required Nazi reading. Chamberlain married Wagner's daughter, Eva. After the deaths of Cosima and Siegfried Wagner in 1930, the operation of the Festival fell to Siegfried's widow, English-born Winifred, who was a friend of Adolf Hitler. The latter was a fanatical admirer of Wagner's music and sought to incorporate it into his heroic mythology of the German nation. Hitler held many of Wagner's original scores in his Berlin bunker at the end of World War II, despite the pleadings of Wieland Wagner to have these important documents put in his care; the scores perished with Hitler in the final days of the war.

Many scholars have argued that Wagner's views, particularly his antisemitism and purported Aryan-Germanic racism, influenced the Nazis. These claims are disputed. Recent studies suggest that there is no evidence that Hitler even read any of Wagner's writings and further argue that Wagner's works do not inherently support Nazi notions of heroism. During the Nazi regime, Parsifal was denounced as being "ideologically unacceptable" and the opera was not performed at Bayreuth during the war years. It has been suggested that a de facto ban had been placed on Parsifal by the Nazis; however there were 23 performances at the Deutsche Oper Berlin, between 1939 and 1942, which suggests that no formal ban was in place.

The Nazi fascination with Wagner was largely inspired by Hitler, sometimes to the dismay of other high-ranking Nazi officials, including Joseph Goebbels. In 1933, for instance, Hitler ordered that each Nuremberg Rally open with a performance of the overture from Rienzi. He also issued one thousand free tickets for an annual Bayreuth performance of Meistersinger to Nazi functionaries. When Hitler entered the theater, however, he discovered that it was almost empty. The following year, those functionaries were ordered to attend, but they could be seen dozing off during the performance, so that in 1935, Hitler conceded and released the tickets to the public.

In general, while Wagner's music was often performed during the Third Reich, his popularity actually declined in Germany in favor of Italian composers such as Verdi and Puccini. By the 1938–39 season, Wagner had only one opera in the list of fifteen most popular operas of the season, with the list headed by Italian composer Ruggero Leoncavallo's Pagliacci. Ironically, according to Albert Speer, the Berlin Philharmonic Orchestra's last performance before their evacuation from Berlin at the end of World War II was of Brünnhilde's immolation scene at the end of Götterdämmerung.

As part of the regime's propaganda intentions of 'Nazifying' German culture, specific attempts were made to appropriate Wagner's music as 'Nazi' and pseudo-academic articles appeared such as Paul Bülow's "Adolf Hitler and the Bayreuth Ideological Circle" (Zeitschrift für Musik, July 1933). Such articles were Nazi attempts to rewrite history to demonstrate that Hitler was integral to German culture.

There is evidence that music of Wagner was used at the Dachau concentration camp in 1933/34 to 'reeducate' political prisoners by exposure to 'national music'. However, there seems to be no documentation to support claims sometimes made that his music was played at Nazi death camps.

== Wagner's music in Israel ==
Wagner's operas have never been staged in the modern State of Israel, and the few public instrumental performances that have occurred have provoked much controversy.

Despite Wagner's known writings against Jews, there was no opposition to his music in the early Zionist movement and its founders; Theodor Herzl, the founder of Zionism, admired Wagner's music despite feeling abhorred by his racist opinions. The Palestine Orchestra, founded in 1936 by Bronisław Huberman in what is now the state of Israel (and which became the Israel Philharmonic Orchestra), 'during its first two years ... programme[d] several works by Richard Wagner who was recognised as one of the great Western composers despite the well-known fact that he had been a fanatical anti-Semite'. However, the orchestra banished his works from its repertoire after Kristallnacht in 1938 (to be followed shortly after by the exclusion of works of Richard Strauss).

Although Wagner's works are broadcast on Israeli government-owned radio and television stations, attempts to stage public performances in Israel have raised protests, including protests from Holocaust survivors. In 1981 Zubin Mehta, as an encore at an orchestral concert in Tel-Aviv, played extracts from Tristan und Isolde, after offering those who wished (including two members of the orchestra who had asked to be excused) the opportunity to leave. Despite a few vocal protests, most of the audience stayed to the end of the piece. In 1992, Daniel Barenboim programmed works by Wagner at a concert of the Israel Philharmonic, but this was cancelled after protests, although a rehearsal was opened to the public. The first documented public Israeli Wagner concerts were in 2000, when the Holocaust survivor Mendi Rodan conducted the Siegfried Idyll in Rishon LeZion, and in August 2001 when a concert conducted by Barenboim in Tel Aviv included as an encore an extract from Tristan und Isolde, which divided the audience between applause and protest. A concert with works by Wagner was announced for 18 June 2012 in Tel Aviv; however these plans were abandoned after protests.
