= Ludwig Schemann =

German translator and race theorist (1852–1938)

- Born: Ludwig Schemann; October 16, 1852; Cologne, Prussia
- Died: February 13, 1938 (aged 85); Freiburg im Breisgau, Germany
- Education: Heidelberg University, Royal Friedrich Wilhelm University of Berlin BA, MA; University of Bonn (PhD)
- Awards: Goethe Medal for Art and Science (1937); Honorary citizen of Freiburg (1933, revoked 1946)
- Scientific career
- Fields: History, Philology, Scientific Racism
- Workplaces: Göttingen State and University Library
- Thesis: De legionum per alterum bellum Punicum historia quae investigari posse videantur (1875)
- Doctoral advisor: Hermann Usener
- Other academic advisors: Emil Hübner, Adolf Kirchhoff, Theodor Mommsen

Karl Ludwig Schemann (16 October 1852 in Cologne – 13 February 1938 in Freiburg im Breisgau) was a German translator and race theorist. He promoted anti-Semitism and was instrumental in promoting Gobinism to Germany. He "did a great deal to bring Gobineau's term 'Aryan' into vogue amongst German racists".

== Biography ==
Since 1863 Schemann attended the Casimirianum Coburg until he started studying history and philology first at the Heidelberg University and then at the Royal Friedrich Wilhelm University of Berlin. He earned his PhD at the University of Bonn in 1875.

Schemann translated An Essay on the Inequality of the Human Races by Arthur de Gobineau into German between 1893 and 1902.

Like Gobineau, Schemann thought that Europe's cultural achievement had been brought about by the "Aryan race". However, in contrast to Gobineau, he did not see the "Aryans" as doomed. According to Schemann, the acting subject in history is not only the individual, but also the race. He saw the "Aryan" race as called upon to bring about the "salvation" of mankind.

Schemann was a librarian at the Göttingen State and University Library from 1875 to 1891. In 1894 he founded the Gobineau Association (Gobineau-Vereinigung), which he chaired until 1920.

Together with Adolf Bartels, Arthur Moeller van den Bruck, Houston Stewart Chamberlain, Henry Thode and Hermann Hendrich, Schemann was one of the founders of the völkisch Werdandi-Bundes and was a member of the Bayreuth Circle. In addition, he was involved with other race ideologists such as the anthropologist Otto Ammon and the writer Theodor Fritsch in the Pan-German League.

Schemann was a member of the German Society for Racial Hygiene and became a vocal supporter of the Militant League for German Culture in 1928. In 1933 he was made an honorary citizen of the city of Freiburg. In 1937 he was made an honorary member of the National Socialist Institute for the History of New Germany and received the Goethe-Medaille für Kunst und Wissenschaft.

His legacy is in the University Library Freiburg.

== Publications (Selection) ==
- De legionum per alterum bellum Punicum historia quae investigari posse videantur, Dissertation, Bonn, 1875 (source).
- Richard Wagner in seinen künstlerischen Bestrebungen und seiner Bedeutung für eine nationale Kultur. Wolfenbüttel 1878
- Graf Arthur Gobineau, Frommann, Stuttgart 1907.
- Gobineaus Rassenwerk. Aktenstücke und Betrachtungen zur Geschichte und Kritik des „Essai sur l'inégalité des races humaines“, Fromm, Stuttgart 1910.
- Alexis de Tocqueville, Frommann, Stuttgart 1911.
- Die Rasse in den Geisteswissenschaften. Studien zur Geschichte des Rassengedankens Three Volumes, 1928-1931.
- Wolfgang Kapp und das Märzunternehmen vom Jahre 1920. Ein Wort der Sühne, Lehmann, München u. a. 1937.
