= Anténor Firmin =

Haitian French anthropologist, philosopher, journalist, and politician (1850–1911)

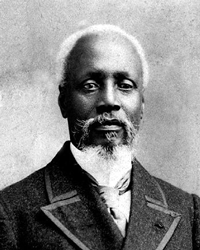

Minister of Finance, Commerce and Foreign Affairs
- In office December 17, 1896 – July 26, 1897
- President: Tirésias Simon Sam
- Preceded by: Callisthènes Fouchard (Finance and Commerce); Pourcely Faine (Foreign Affairs)
- Succeeded by: Solon Ménos
- In office October 29, 1889 – May 3, 1891
- President: Florvil Hyppolite
- Preceded by: Saint-Martin Dupuy (Finance and Commerce); Himself (Foreign Affairs)
- Succeeded by: Hugon Lechaud

Minister of Foreign Affairs, Agriculture and Worship
- In office August 22, 1889 – October 29, 1889
- President: Florvil Hyppolite
- Preceded by: Saint-Martin Dupuy (Foreign Affairs); Néré Numa (Agriculture); Maximillien Laforest (Worship)
- Succeeded by: Himself (Foreign Affairs); Clément Haentjens (Agriculture); Léger Cauvin (Worship)

Member of the provisional Government of the Republic of Haiti
- In office August 22, 1889 – October 9, 1889

Personal details
- Born: Joseph Auguste Anténor Firmin; October 18, 1850 Cap-Haïtien, Haiti
- Died: September 19, 1911 (aged 60) Saint Thomas, Danish West Indies
- Party: Parti libéral
- Spouse: Marie Louise Victoria Rosa Salnave
- Children: Anne-Marie Firmin; Georges Anténor Firmin
- Profession: Anthropologist, Egyptologist, Politician and Journalist

Joseph Auguste Anténor Firmin (18 October 1850 – 19 September 1911), better known as Anténor Firmin, was a Haitian barrister and philosopher, pioneering anthropologist, journalist, and politician. Firmin is best known for his book De l'égalité des races humaines (English: "The Equality of the Human Races"), which was published in 1885 as a rebuttal to French writer Count Arthur de Gobineau's work Essai sur l'inégalité des races humaines (English: "Essay on the Inequality of Human Races"). Gobineau's book asserted the superiority of the Aryan race and the inferiority of Blacks and other people of color. Firmin's book argued the opposite, that "all men are endowed with the same qualities and the same faults, without distinction of color or anatomical form. The races are equal". He was marginalized at the time for his beliefs that all human races were equal.

== Biography ==
Joseph Auguste Anténor Firmin was born as the third generation of a post-independent Haiti in a working-class family. Firmin advanced quickly in his studies and started teaching when he was 17. He studied accounting and law. He found early jobs at the Haitian Customs Office and as a clerk for a private business. He quit his clerical position to teach Greek, Latin and French.

He was close to the Liberal Party and he started the newspaper Le Messager du Nord. The political turmoil surrounding the new government of Lysius Salomon forced him into exile in Paris where he served as a diplomat. During this time, he was admitted to the Société d’Anthropologie de Paris where he began writing De l'égalité des races humaines.

Firmin attended meetings of the Société as a regular member, but he was silenced by a racialist physical anthropology dominant at the time and due to racism. The transcripts of the Société’s deliberations included in the Mémoires show that Firmin rose to speak only twice, and on both occasions he was silenced by racialist or racist comments.

In the aftermath of Tirésias Simon Sam's resignation as president in May 1902, Firmin decided to contest the presidency. Supporters such as Admiral Hammerton Killick fought troops loyal to Pierre Nord Alexis, the Haitian military and provisional government's preferred candidate. Firmin's campaign ended when Killick died in an act of destroying his own ship, the Crête-à-Pierrot, which was under threat of capture by the Imperial German Navy's SMS Panther. After Alexis took power, Firmin was sent to live in exile on Saint Thomas in the Danish West Indies.

== Work ==
Anténor Firmin's major work, De l’égalité des races humaines (anthropologie positive) was published in Paris in 1885. Its importance was unrecognized for several decades. The recovered text was translated by Haitian scholar Asselin Charles and published in English as The Equality of the Human Races (Positivist Anthropology) in 2000, 115 years after its original publication. The text has been since been re-evaluated alongside foundational works in the field of anthropology published in the same era.

Firmin pioneered the integration of race and physical anthropology and is the first Black anthropologist. His work was recognized not only in Haiti but also among African scholars as an early work of négritude. He influenced Jean Price-Mars, the founder of Haitian ethnology and American anthropologists Melville Herskovits and Franz Boas.

Following the ideas of Auguste Comte, Firmin was a stark positivist who believed that the empiricism used to study humanity was a counter to the speculative philosophical theories about the inequalities of races. Firmin sought to redefine the science of anthropology in his work. He critiqued certain conventionally-held aspects of anthropology, such as craniometry and racialist interpretations of human physical data. He was the first to point out how racial typologies failed to account for the successes of those of mixed race as well as one of the first to state an accurate scientific basis for skin pigmentation.

=== The Equality of the Human Races ===
In De l'égalité des races humaines, Firmin tackles two bases of existing theories on black inferiority in an effort to critique Gobineau's Essai sur l'inégalité des races humaines. On the one hand, Firmin challenges the idea of brain size or cephalic index as a measure of human intelligence and on the other he reasserts the presence of Black Africans in Pharaonic Egypt. He then delves into the significance of the Haitian Revolution of 1804 and ensuing achievements of Haitians such as Léon Audain and Isaïe Jeanty in medicine and science and Edmond Paul in the social sciences. (Both Audain and Jeanty had obtained prizes from the Académie Nationale de Médecine.)

=== Founder of Pan-Africanism ===
Firmin is one of three Caribbean men who launched the idea of Pan-Africanism at the end of the 19th century to combat colonialism in Africa. As a candidate in Haiti's 1902 presidential elections, he declared that the Haitian state should "serve in the rehabilitation of Africa". Along with Trinidadian lawyer Henry Sylvester Williams and fellow Haitian Bénito Sylvain, he was the organizer of the First Pan-African Conference which took place in London in 1900. That conference launched the Pan-Africanism movement. W. E. B. Du Bois attended the conference and was put in charge of drafting the general report. After the conference, five pan-African congresses were held in the 20th century, which eventually led to the creation of the African Union.

Firmin was invested in the three main elements of Pan-Africanist thought: the rejection of the postulate of race inequality, proof that Africans were capable of civilization, and examples of successful Africans producing knowledge in diverse fields. In looking to move away from the biological understanding of race, Firmin's scientific approach was informed by the idea of a Black Egypt as the source of Greek civilization.

=== Pan-Caribbeanism ===
Anténor Firmin devised between 1875 and 1898 a Caribbean Confederation project which envisioned the unification of Cuba, Haiti, the Dominican Republic, Jamaica and Puerto Rico.

Firmin was interested in creating political and social unity throughout the Caribbean. This can be seen through his relationship with Puerto Rican intellectual and physician Ramon Emeterio Betances. The pair first met in a meeting of the Society of Latin American Unity, an organisation that served as a social and political network for exiles from Latin America. It is here where they discussed the ideals of political sovereignty throughout the region. Unlike other icons from the Cuban and Puerto Rican separatist movements, Betances celebration of the Haitian Revolution countered those who did not see Haiti as an ideal revolutionary model, thus excluding it in their own plans for a Hispanic Caribbean federation.

=== Letters from St. Thomas ===
In his last work, Letters from St. Thomas, Firmin remaps Haiti in the archipelago of the Americas, outlining its significance to the region as a whole. The letters reinforce Firmin's anti-essentialist agenda first displayed in De l'égalité des races humaines.

== Bibliography ==
- De l'égalité des races humaines (1885)
  - English translation: The Equality of the Human Races (Positivist Anthropology) (2000)
- Haïti et la France (1891)
- Une défense (1892)
- Diplomate et diplomatie (1898)
- M. Roosevelt, Président des États-Unis et la République d'Haïti (1905)
- Lettres de Saint-Thomas (1910)
