= The Equality of the Human Races =

1885 book by Anténor Firmin

The Equality of the Human Races (Positivist Anthropology)
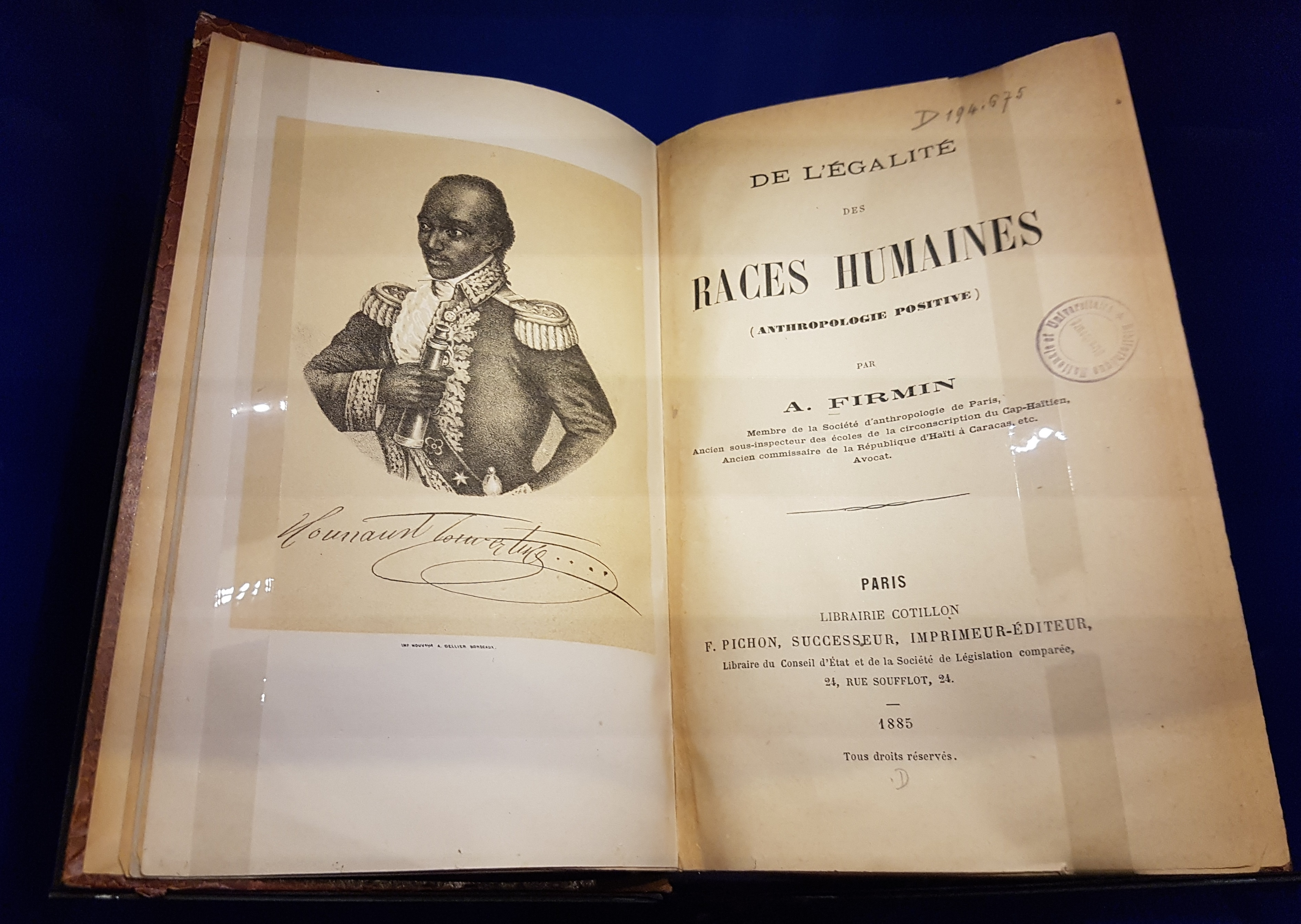
- Cover of the original edition
- Author: Anténor Firmin
- Original title: De l'égalité des races humaines (Anthropologie positive)
- Language: French
- Publication date: 1885

The Equality of the Human Races (Positivist Anthropology) (originally: De l'égalité des races humaines (Anthropologie positive)) was a book published in 1885 by Haitian lawyer, scholar, and diplomat Anténor Firmin.

The book is a rebuttal of scientific racism, primarily Arthur de Gobineau's work An Essay on the Inequality of the Human Races and the work of Paul Broca.

== Context ==
In 1884, Firmin was elected as a member of the Society of Anthropology of Paris. He joined after encountering "dogmatic assertions of the inequality of the races and the inferiority of Blacks" from its members. When sitting in during discussions of the society, racism was common and it was considered an established fact that Black people were inferior.

During his four years in the society, he only rose to speak twice, both times being silenced by racialist or racist comments.

Firmin wrote the book after a year in the society as a critique of race doctrine in French Anthropology and the relation between racism and European colonialism.

It was published during the same time period as other texts considered foundational in Anthropology, such as Ancient Society, Primitive Culture, and Éléments d'anthropologie générale.

== Summary ==
The book first summarizes the history of Anthropology as a discipline, recounts early taxonomies of living organisms, and overviews scientific definitions of species and speciation.

It then provides an overview of the debate between supporters of monogenism and polygenism. It criticizes the latter, which holds that human races are separate species with separate origins. He differentiates between supporters of polygenism among those defending oppression, such as the Confederate States of America, and what he views as the incorrect science of anti-clerical French anthropologists like Paul Broca.

Firmin reviews and critiques methods of classifying human races, such as craniometry, anthropometry, hair and skin pigmentation, and linguistic classifications. He argues that anthropology inherited these classifications and none are useful metrics, showing errors in each.

He describes how races are artificially ranked by European scholars, particularly Gobineau. He argues that early civilizations considered themselves better than their neighbors, whether they looked similar or different, but did not use any notions of systematic hierarchy among races. He considers this shift to have originated with the birth of ethnography as a field and to be tied to slavery and domination.

He frequently points to Mulattos, particularly in Haiti, as evidence against theories that miscegenation renders unhealthy or infertile children. He argues all races are capable of "perfectability" through civilization and education and share a constitutional unity of intellect.

He criticizes theories that ancient Egypt was a white civilization and that Indian civilization was built by a white Aryan race. He highlights Black intellectuals and civilizations as evidence of Black people's equality and contributions to human knowledge as a whole. He turns to Haiti and Haitian Independence as the most modern examples.

He concludes that the theory that races are unequal was a European strategy to maintain global domination and political and economic exploitation.

== Influence ==
The book was first published in France in 1885 and soon went out of print, even in Haiti, until 1968. From then on, French copies began to be printed in Haiti again. An English translation was first published in 2000.

When first published, the Paris Anthropology Society quietly shelved his work and didn't publicly acknowledge or discuss it.

The work and Firmin were mostly known in Haiti and not further until republishing. Haitian diplomat and scholar Jean Price-Mars, who was Firmin's contemporary, was heavily influenced by them. He wrote a biography of Firmin, posthumously published in 1964, which devoted a chapter to the book as an incredible achievement not just for its ideas, but for being written in the span of 18 months.

The book is now considered a pioneering work in Anthropology and Pan-Africanism.
