= Bayreuth Circle =

The Bayreuth Circle (German: Der Bayreuther Kreis) was a name originally applied by some writers to devotees of Richard Wagner's music who attended and supported the annual Bayreuth Festival in the later 19th and early twentieth centuries. As some of these devotees espoused nationalistic German politics, and some of them were supporters of Adolf Hitler from the 1920s onwards, this group of people has been associated by some writers with the rise of Nazism.

== History ==
The term 'Bayreuth Circle' was originally applied to the enthusiasts of Wagner's music who were also associated with or subscribed to the publication Bayreuther Blätter, established in the 1880s by Wagner himself and edited by Hans von Wolzogen. This journal, apart from containing snippets by Wagner himself on social, political and aesthetic matters, was also strongly nationalistic and antisemitic. Its circulation was small and it was not politically influential.

After the death of Wagner in 1883, his second wife Cosima, in continuing to propagate what she saw as her husband's views, was supported by a number of active antisemites, including Houston Stewart Chamberlain and Ludwig Schemann. Schemann, the founder of the German Gobineau Society, 'did a great deal to bring Gobineau's term 'Aryan' into vogue amongst German racists'. Chamberlain (d. 1927), who wrote an influential antisemitic book, The Foundations of the Nineteenth Century, married Eva Wagner, daughter of the composer.

== Assertions of political influence ==
There never was any organisation named the 'Bayreuth Circle' or any group of people who identified themselves by that name, but the term has been used by some historians from about the 1960s onwards as a convenient label for Hitler supporters associated with Bayreuth. Examples of such association are given in the following citations.

"Only with timely support from the Bayreuth circle, especially Houston S. Chamberlain, Winifred Wagner, and henchmen like Dietrich Eckhart in the Thule Society, could the unimpressive Hitler assume the self- then public image of a Wotan/Siegfried figure, complete with telling nickname: "Wolf."

"Thus Hitler himself admitted: 'It was Cosima Wagner's merit to have created the link between Bayreuth and National Socialism'. It was the Bayreuth circle which raised Wagner's message to the status of gospel, manoeuvring his ideas into a Germanic-Christian doctrine of salvation."

Strong on assertion, such statements are void of supporting evidence: it should be borne in mind that Eckhardt died in 1923, Chamberlain was dead in 1927, and Cosima Wagner in 1930, i.e. before the first political victory of the Nazi party in the September 1930 elections. Whilst these personages were (or would have been) undoubtedly supporters of Hitler, they played little or no part, and had no influence, in his climb to power. These citations also make the typical, and unsubstantiated, assumption of many modern historians that the German people in general (or even active Nazis in particular) knew, or cared, anything at all about Wagner or his operas.

Evidence for any political active role played by a 'Bayreuth Circle' as a group is therefore highly contentious.

== Personalities cited as members ==
Amongst those often listed as 'members' of a Hitlerian Bayreuth Circle are Cosima Wagner (d. 1930), second wife of the composer, Winifred Wagner, wife of the composer's son Siegfried, and H. S. Chamberlain. None of the Wagners, however, played any personally active role in the Nazi movement, although Hitler was undoubtedly influenced by Chamberlain's Foundations of the Nineteenth Century. Chamberlain himself joined the Nazi Party and contributed to its publications. The Nazi journal Völkischer Beobachter dedicated five columns to praising him on his 70th birthday, describing Foundations as the "gospel of the Nazi movement". Hitler later attended Chamberlain's funeral in January, 1927 along with several highly ranked members of the Nazi party. Other members of the putative 'Circle', such as Winifred Wagner, were sycophants of Hitler, partly from political sympathy, partly in the hopes of obtaining advantages (including financial support) for the Bayreuth Festival. There is however no evidence that the actions of either Chamberlain or Winifred Wagner—or others associated with Bayreuth—led Hitler to power or had any influence over him once he obtained it.

== Bayreuth and Nazi appropriation of German culture ==
Later in the Nazi era, as part of the regime's propaganda intentions of 'Nazifying' German culture, specific attempts were made to appropriate Wagner's music as 'Nazi' and pseudo-academic articles appeared such as Paul Bulow's Adolf Hitler and the Bayreuth Ideological Circle (Zeitschrift fur Musik, July 1933). Such articles, as pointed out by cultural historian Frederic Spotts, were Nazi attempts to rewrite history to demonstrate that Hitler was integral to German culture. Modern writers who assert any political or social significance to the 'Bayreuth circle' risk falling into the traps thus set by Nazi ideologues.

== See also ==
- Wagner controversies

== Literature ==
- Evans, Richard J., The Coming of the Third Reich, London 2003. ISBN 978-0-14-100975-9
- Altgeld, Wolfgang, "Wagner, der Bayreuther Kreis und die Entwicklung des völkischen Denkens". In: Richard Wagner 1883-1983, ed. U. Müller. Stuttgart 1984, S. 35–64. Considers Wagner's relationships with Bayreuth enthusiasts in his own lifetime.
- Schüler, Winfried, Der Bayreuther Kreis von seiner Entstehung bis zum Ausgang der Wilhelminischen Ära. Wagnerkult und Kulturreform im Geiste völkischer Weltanschauung. Münster 1971. Deals with Bayreuth enthusiasts of the late nineteenth century.
- Spotts, Frederic (1996). Bayreuth: A History of the Wagner Festival. ISBN 0-300-06665-1.
