= The Foundations of the Nineteenth Century =

1899 Book by Houston Stewart Chamberlain

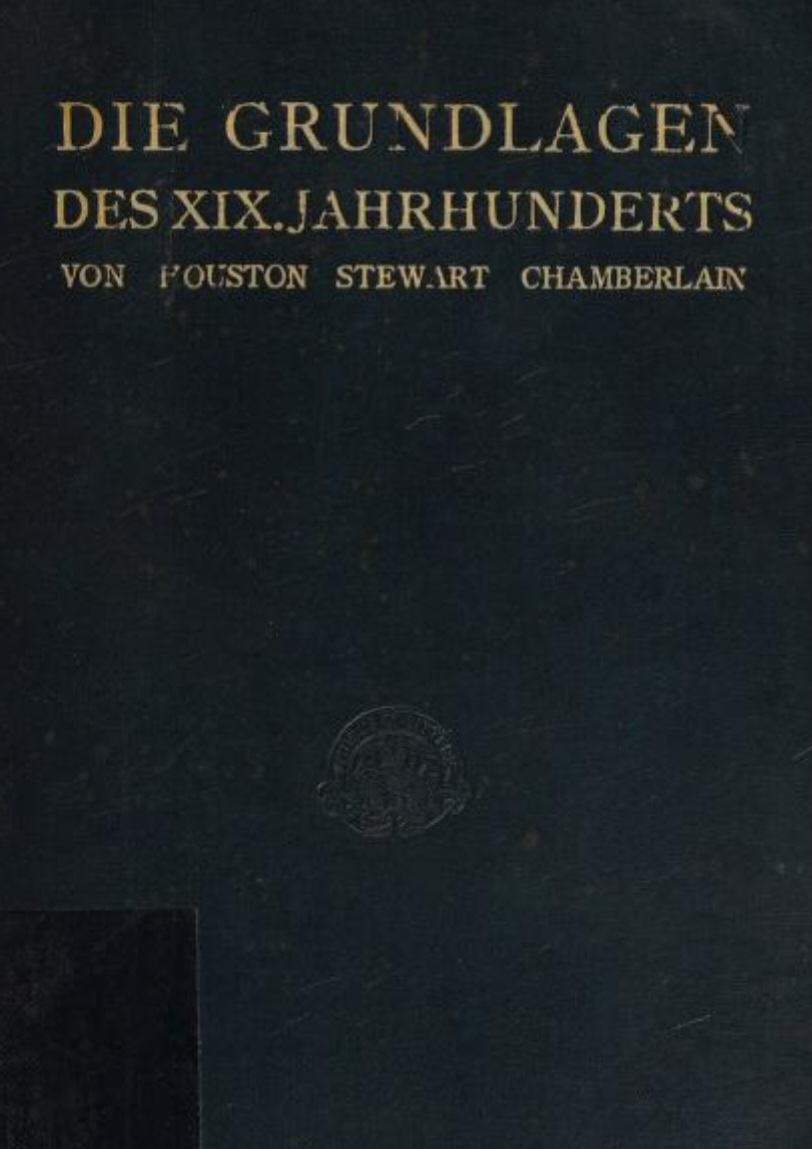
- German cover
- Author: Houston Stewart Chamberlain
- Translator: from the German: by John Lees, MA, with an introduction by Lord Redesdale
- Subjects: Nineteenth century History--Philosophy; Civilization--History
- Published: 1911
- Publisher: London, New York, John Lane
- Media type: Print
- Pages: 2 v. illus., maps. 22 cm.
- OCLC: 1219756
- Dewey Decimal: 901
- LC Class: CB83 .C45 1911

The Foundations of the Nineteenth Century (German: Die Grundlagen des neunzehnten Jahrhunderts) is an 1899 racialist book by the British-German philosopher Houston Stewart Chamberlain. In the book, Chamberlain advances various racialist and especially völkisch antisemitic theories on how he saw the Aryan race as superior to others, and the Teutonic peoples as a positive force in European civilization and the Jews as a negative one. The book was his best-selling work.

== Synopsis ==
Published in German, the book advocates a form of Nordicism and focuses on the controversial pseudoscientific notion that Western civilization is deeply marked by the influence of the Teutonic peoples. Chamberlain grouped all European peoples—not just Germans, but Celts, Slavs, Greeks, and Latins—into the "Aryan race", a race built on the ancient Proto-Indo-European culture. At the helm of the Aryan race, and, indeed, all races, he saw the Nordic or Teutonic peoples.

Certain anthropologists would fain teach us that all races are equally gifted; we point to history and answer: that is a lie! The races of mankind are markedly different in the nature and also in the extent of their gifts, and the Germanic races belong to the most highly gifted group, the group usually termed Aryan ... Physically and mentally the Aryans are pre-eminent among all peoples; for that reason they are by right ... the lords of the world. Do we not see the homo syriacus develop just as well and as happily in the position of slave as of master? Do the Chinese not show us another example of the same nature?

Chamberlain's book focused on the claim that the Teutonic peoples were the heirs to the empires of Greece and Rome, something which Charlemagne and some of his successors also believed. He argued that when Germanic tribes destroyed the Roman Empire, Jews and other non-Europeans already dominated it. The Germanic tribes, in this scenario, saved Western civilization from Semitic domination. Chamberlain's thoughts were influenced by writings of Arthur de Gobineau (1816–1882), who had argued the superiority of the "Aryan race". This term was increasingly being used to describe Caucasian or European peoples, as opposed to Jews, who were conceptualised as "infusing Near Eastern poison into the European body politic". For Chamberlain the concept of an Aryan race was not simply defined by ethno-linguistic origins. It was also an abstract ideal of a racial élite. The Aryan, or "noble" race, was always changing as superior peoples supplanted inferior ones in evolutionary struggles for survival.

Building somewhat on the theories of de Gobineau and Georges Vacher de Lapouge (1854–1936), Chamberlain developed a relatively complex theory relating racial origins, physical features and cultural traits. According to Chamberlain, the modern Jew (Homo judaeica) mixes some of the features of the Hittite (H. syriaca) – notably the "Jewish nose", retreating chin, great cunning and fondness for usury – and of the true Semite, the Bedouin Arab (H. arabicus), in particular the dolichocephalic (long and narrow) skull, the thick-set body, and a tendency to be anti-intellectual and destructive. According to this theory, the product of this miscegenation was compromised by the great differences between these two stocks:

All historically great races and nations have been produced by mixing; but wherever the difference of type is too great to be bridged over, then we have mongrels. That is the case here. The crossing between Bedouin and Syrian was — from an anatomical point of view — probably worse than that between Spaniard and South American Indian.

Chamberlain also considered the Berbers from North Africa as belonging to the Aryan race.

The noble Moor of Spain is anything but a pure Arab of the desert, he is half a Berber (from the Aryan race) and his veins are so full of Gothic blood that even at the present day noble inhabitants of Morocco can trace their descent back to Teutonic ancestors.

Chamberlain (who had graduate training in biology) rejected Darwinism, evolution and social Darwinism, and instead emphasized "gestalt", which (he said) derived from Goethe. Chamberlain regarded Darwinism as the most abominable and misguided doctrine of the day.

Chamberlain used an old biblical notion of the ethnic makeup of Galilee to argue that while Jesus may have been Jewish by religion, he was probably not Jewish by race, claiming that he descended from the Amorites. During the inter-war period, certain pro-Nazi theologians, such as Walter Bauer and Walter Grundmann, and American Assyriologist Paul Haupt developed these ideas as part of the manufacture of an Aryan Jesus. Chamberlain's admirer Adolf Hitler held a similar view, as evidenced in his table talk, where he canvassed the idea of Jesus as the illegitimate son of a Roman soldier stationed in Galilee.

== Reception ==
The Foundations sold extensively: eight editions and 60,000 copies within ten years, 100,000 copies by the outbreak of World War I and 24 editions and more than a quarter of a million copies by 1938. The Russian translation was especially popular and was carried by White Russians all the way to Siberia.

The 1911 translation received positive reviews in most of the British press. It was praised in The Spectator as "a monument of erudition"; the Birmingham Post wrote that it was "glowing with life, packed with fresh and vigorous thought"; the Glasgow Herald thought that it would be difficult to "over-estimate the stimulating qualities of the book." In the Times Literary Supplement it was declared to be "one of the books that really mattered". In the left-wing Fabian News George Bernard Shaw called it a "historical masterpiece". Those who failed to read it, he continued, would be unable to talk intelligently about contemporary sociological and political problems. In the U.S., Theodore Roosevelt attributed an extreme bias to the author. Roosevelt wrote in 1913 that Chamberlain "represents an influence to be reckoned with and seriously to be taken into account."

The book was important to Wilhelm II, who became Chamberlain's friend (the two held a correspondence), and as a "spiritual" foundation of Nazi Germany. Chamberlain's ideas on race were greatly influential to Adolf Hitler, who readily adapted them into his Nazi ideology. Chamberlain himself joined the Nazi party, and both Hitler and Nazi Propaganda Minister Joseph Goebbels visited Chamberlain whilst he was on his deathbed.

== See also ==
- Antisemitism
- Kirchenkampf
- The Myth of the Twentieth Century
- Positive Christianity
- Race and appearance of Jesus
- Collective Aryan unconscious
- Adolf Hitler's religious views
