= Otto Ammon =

German anthropologist (1842–1916)

Otto Georg Ammon (December 7, 1842 in Karlsruhe, Baden – January 14, 1916 in Karlsruhe) was a German anthropologist. Ammon initially pursued a career as an engineer from 1863 to 1868. In 1883, he led a geographical and geological exploration of Roman roads. Subsequently, in 1887, he delved into anthropological research and became a member of the Ancient Karlsruher Association and the Natural Science Association. In recognition of his contributions, he was awarded an honorary doctorate from the University of Freiburg in 1904. Ammon coined the term 'social anthropology' for his work, but others regarded it as akin to 'social Darwinism' or, later, eugenics. One of his notable works was "Natural Selection among Humans" (1893), in which he presented the argument that a notably higher proportion of individuals with Germanic heritage can be identified among European aristocracies.

== Selected works ==
- Natürliche Auslese beim Menschen, 1893 (Natural selection among humans)
- Zur Anthropologie der Badener, 1899 (On the anthropology of the people of Baden)
- Gesellschaftsordnung und ihre natürliche Anlage, 1900 (Social order and its natural application)
