= An Essay on the Inequality of the Human Races =

1853–1855 essays of Arthur de Gobineau

Essay on the Inequality of the Human Races
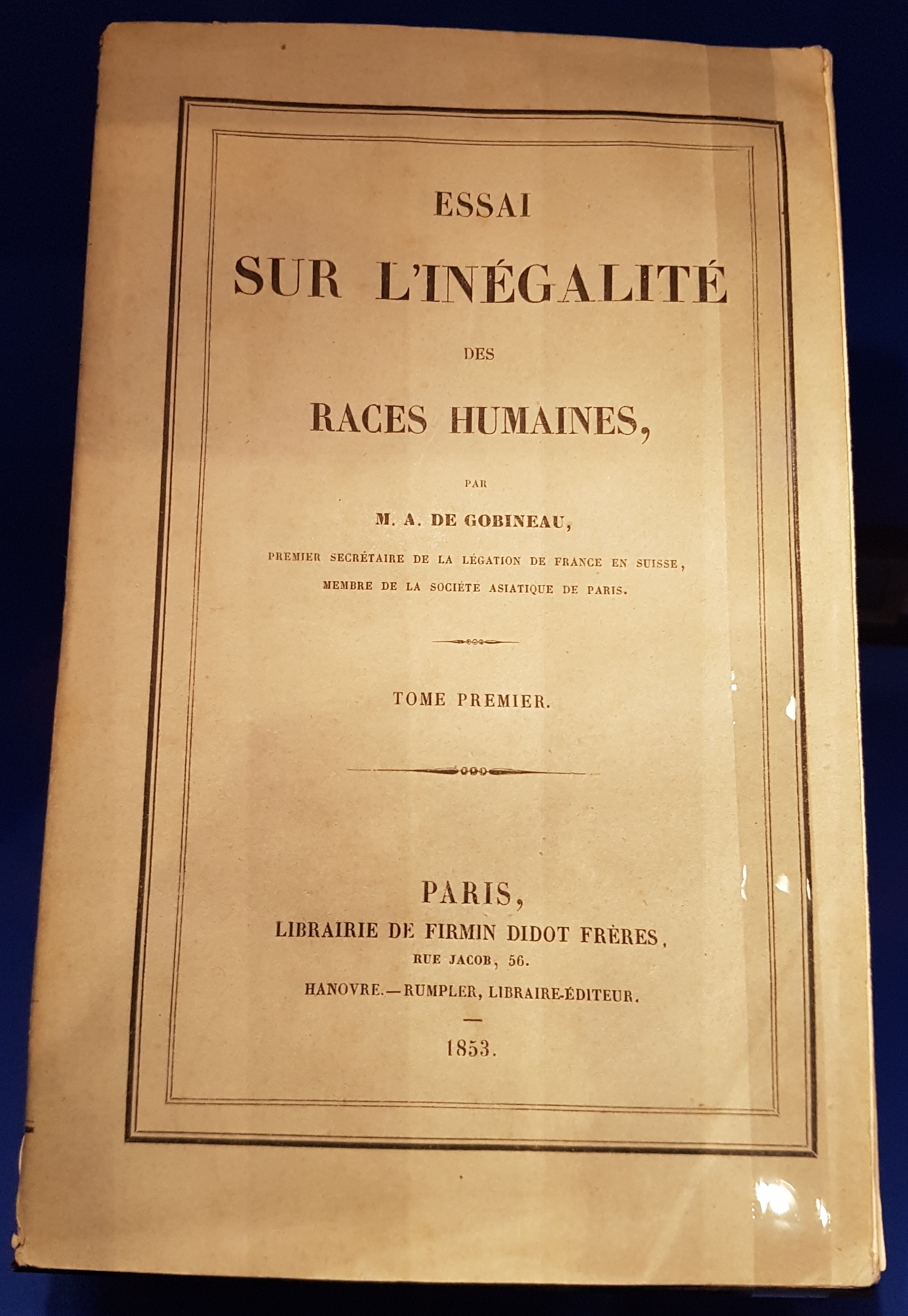
- Cover of the original edition
- Original title: Essai sur l'inégalité des races humaines
- Language: French
- Publication date: 1853–1855
- Text: Essay on the Inequality of the Human Races at Internet Archive

An Essay on the Inequality of the Human Races (originally: Essai sur l'inégalité des races humaines), published between 1853 and 1855, is a racialist work of French diplomat and writer Arthur de Gobineau. It argues that there are intellectual differences between human races, that civilizations decline and fall when the races are mixed and that the white race is superior. It is considered to be an influential early example of scientific racism.

Expanding upon Boulainvilliers' use of ethnography to defend the Ancien Régime against the claims of the Third Estate, Gobineau aimed for an explanatory system universal in scope: namely, that race is the primary force determining world events. Using scientific disciplines as varied as linguistics and anthropology, Gobineau divides the human species into three major groupings, white, yellow and black, claiming to demonstrate that "history springs only from contact with the white races." Among the white races, he distinguishes the Aryan race, specifically the Nordic race and Germanic peoples, as the pinnacle of human development, comprising the basis of all European aristocracies. However, according to Gobineau, inevitable miscegenation led to the "downfall of civilizations".

== Background ==
Gobineau was a Legitimist who despaired at France's decline into republicanism and centralization. The book was written after the 1848 revolution when Gobineau began studying the works of physiologists Xavier Bichat and Johann Blumenbach.

The book was dedicated to King George V of Hanover (1851–66), the last king of Hanover. In the dedication, Gobineau writes that he presents to His Majesty the fruits of his speculations and studies into the hidden causes of the "revolutions, bloody wars, and lawlessness" ("révolutions, guerres sanglantes, renversements de lois") of the age.

In a letter to Count Anton von Prokesch-Osten in 1856 he describes the book as based on "a hatred for democracy and its weapon, the Revolution, which I satisfied by showing, in a variety of ways, where revolution and democracy come from and where they are going."

=== Gobineau and the Bible ===
In Vol I, chapter 11, "Les différences ethniques sont permanentes" ("The ethnic differences are permanent"), Gobineau writes that "Adam is the originator of our white species" ("Adam soit l'auteur de notre espèce blanche"), and creatures not part of the white race are not part of that species. By this Gobineau refers to his division of humans into three main races: white, black, and yellow. The biblical division into Hamites, Semites, and Japhetites is for Gobineau a division within the white race. In general, Gobineau considers the Bible to be a reliable source of actual history, and he was not a supporter of the idea of polygenesis.

== Influence ==
Steven Kale argues that Gobineau's "influence on the development of racial theory has been exaggerated and his ideas have been routinely misconstrued".

In 1885, Haitian Anthropologist and statesman Anténor Firmin wrote a rebuttal of the essay titled The Equality of the Human Races (Positivist Anthropology) (De l'égalité des races humaines (anthropologie positive)).

Gobineau's ideas found an audience in the United States and in German-speaking areas more so than in France, becoming the inspiration for a host of racial theories, for example those of Houston Stewart Chamberlain. "Gobineau was the first to theorize that race was the deciding factor in history and the precursors of Nazism repeated some of his ideas, but his principle arguments were either ignored, deformed, or taken out of context in German racial thought".

German historian Joachim C. Fest, who wrote a biography of Hitler, describes Gobineau, in particular his negative views on race-mixing as expressed in his essay, as an eminent influence on Adolf Hitler and Nazism. Fest writes that the influence of Gobineau on Hitler can be easily seen and that Gobineau's ideas were used by Hitler in simplified form for demagogic purposes: "Significantly, Hitler simplified Gobineau's elaborate doctrine until it became demagogically usable and offered a set of plausible explanations for all the discontents, anxieties, and crises of the contemporary scene." However, Professor Steven Kale has cautioned that "Gobineau's influence on German racism has been repeatedly overstated".

Although cited by groups such as the Nazi Party, the text implicitly criticizes antisemitism and describes Jews in positive terms, as a race of "ancient Greek-like strength" of cohesion. Gobineau stated, "Jews ... became a people that succeeded in everything it undertook, a free, strong, and intelligent people, and one which, before it lost, sword in hand, the name of an independent nation, had given as many learned men to the world as it had merchants." According to this view of race, the Jews were an atypical Indo-European ethnicity, descending from really or spuriously Indo-European peoples: Hurrians ("Horites"), Jebusites, Amorites, Hittites, and Mittani. This philosemitic line of argument was generally ignored by Gobineau's subsequent followers, not least the Nazis.

The book continued to influence the white supremacist movement in the United States in the early 21st century.

== Translations ==
Josiah Clark Nott hired Henry Hotze to translate the work into English. Hotze's translation was published in 1856 as The Moral and Intellectual Diversity of Races, with an added essay from Hotze and appendix from Nott. However, it "omitted the laws of repulsion and attraction, which were at the heart of Gobineau's account of the role of race-mixing in the rise and fall of civilizations". Gobineau was not pleased with the version; Gobineau was "particularly concerned that Hotze had ignored his comments on 'American decay generally and upon slaveholding in particular'."

The German translation Versuch über die Ungleichheit der Menschenrassen first appeared in 1897 and was translated by Ludwig Schemann, a member of the Bayreuth Circle and "one of the most important racial theorists of imperial and Weimar Germany".

A new English-language version The Inequality of Human Races, translated by Adrian Collins, was published in Britain and the US in 1915 and remains the standard English-language version. It continues to be republished in the US.

== See also ==
- The Decline of the West – Books by Oswald Spengler, rejecting the Eurocentric model of history
- Denordification – Concept used by Nazi theorists
- IQ and Global Inequality

== Bibliography ==
- Gobineau, Arthur (Count Joseph Arthur de Gobineau) The Inequality of Human Races translated by Adrian Collins
- Gobineau, Arthur (Count Joseph Arthur de Gobineau) The Moral and Intellectual Diversity of Races, with particular reference to their perspective influence in the civil and political history of mankind translated by Henry Hotze
- Gobineau, Arthur (Count Joseph Arthur de Gobineau) Versuch Uber Die Ungleichheit Der Menschenracen translated by Ludwig Schemann
