= American Journal of Biological Anthropology =

- Discipline: Biological anthropology
- Language: English
- Edited by: Connie Mulligan

Publication details
- Former name: American Journal of Physical Anthropology
- History: 1918–present
- Publisher: John Wiley & Sons on behalf of the American Association of Biological Anthropologists (United States)
- Frequency: Monthly
- Impact factor: 2.0 (2024)

Standard abbreviations
- ISO 4: Am. J. Biol. Anthropol.

Indexing
- ISSN: 0002-9483 (print); 1096-8644 (web)
- LCCN: 2015204311
- OCLC no.: 1480176

Links
- Journal homepage; Current issue; Online archive

The American Journal of Biological Anthropology (previously known as the American Journal of Physical Anthropology) is a peer-reviewed scientific journal and an official journal of the American Association of Biological Anthropologists. It was established in 1918 by Aleš Hrdlička (U.S. National Museum, now the Smithsonian Institution's National Museum of Natural History). It covers the field of biological anthropology, a discipline which Hrdlička defined in the first issue as "the study of racial anatomy, physiology and pathology." The Wistar Institute of Anatomy and Biology was the original publisher. Before launching publication, there were few outlets in the United States to publish scientific work in physical anthropology. Scientists hoping to learn more about recent discoveries often had to wait for several months or even years before becoming available in libraries throughout the country.

In addition to its monthly issues, the American Association of Biological Anthropology also publishes a meeting supplement to the AJBA, along with a second official journal, the Yearbook of Biological Anthropology (formerly the Yearbook of Physical Anthropology).

== History ==
In the 19th and early 20th centuries, anthropology was embedded in a larger milieu of scientific racism and eugenics. Hrdlička put prominent eugenicist Charles Davenport on the journal's editorial board, and used his connection to Madison Grant to obtain funding for his new journal. Hrdlička was deeply suspicious of genetics and statistics; not even standard deviations were allowed into his journal during his 24 years as editor-in-chief. After his death, the journal continued as the organ of the American Association of Physical Anthropologists, which Hrdlička had founded in 1930.

== Modern focus ==
Like the field of physical anthropology, the AJBA has grown and developed into research areas far beyond its origins. It publishes research in areas such as human paleontology, osteology, anatomy, biology, genetics, primatology, and forensic science.

== Impact ==
In 2009, the journals were selected by the Special Libraries Association as one of the top 10 most influential journals of the century in the fields of biology and medicine, along with the American Journal of Botany, The BMJ, Journal of Paleontology, JAMA, Journal of Zoology, Nature, New England Journal of Medicine, Proceedings of the National Academy of Sciences, and Science. According to the Journal Citation Reports, the 2020 impact factor of the AJPA and the Yearbook of Physical Anthropology combined was 2.868, ranking the journals 15th out of 93 in the category "Anthropology" and 27th out of 50 in the category "Evolutionary Biology." Additionally, the combined Association journals earned the most citations in the category "Anthropology" each year for over a decade.

In 2023, the combined AJBA-Yearbook of Biological Anthropology impact factor was 1.7, down from 2020 due to their reindexing post-name change.

== Editors of the American Journal of Biological Anthropology ==
- 1918–1942: Aleš Hrdlička
- 1943–1949: T. Dale Stewart
- 1949–1954: William W. Howells
- 1955–1957: Sherwood L. Washburn
- 1958–1963: William S. Laughlin
- 1964–1969: Frederick S. Hulse
- 1970–1977: William S. Pollitzer
- 1977–1983: Francis E. Johnston
- 1983–1989: William A. Stini
- 1989–1995: Matt Cartmill
- 1995–2001: Emőke J.E. Szathmáry
- 2001–2007: Clark Spencer Larsen
- 2007–2013: Christopher B. Ruff
- 2013–2019: Peter Ellison
- 2020–2025: Trudy R. Turner
- 2026-2030: Connie Mulligan

== Yearbook of Biological Anthropology ==
Yearbook of Biological Anthropology
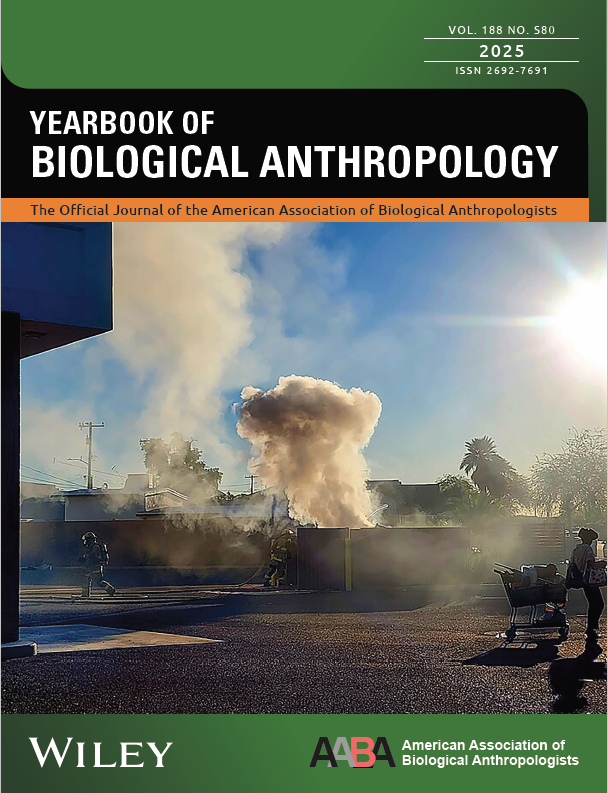
- Discipline: Biological anthropology
- Language: English
- Edited by: Sheela Athreya, Graciela S. Cabana

Publication details
- Former name: Yearbook of Physical Anthropology
- History: 1945–present
- Publisher: John Wiley & Sons on behalf of the American Association of Biological Anthropologists (United States)
- Frequency: Annually
- Open access: Yes

Standard abbreviations
- ISO 4: Yearb. Biol. Anthropol.

Indexing
- ISSN: 0096-848X

Links
- Journal homepage; Online archive

The Yearbook of Biological Anthropology is an official peer-reviewed journal of the American Association of Biological Anthropologists that is published annually. The Yearbook provides "in-depth coverage of the most salient issues in Biological Anthropology. Articles range from scientific pieces that fall squarely within life science models of Biological Anthropology, to theoretical ones that challenge the discipline to see itself in more expansive ways."

== Editors of the Yearbook of Biological Anthropology ==
The editors are listed below by year:

- 1945-1946: Gabriel Lasker
- 1947: Gabriel Lasker, J. L. Angel
- 1948: Gabriel Lasker, F. P. Thieme
- 1949: Gabriel Lasker, C. I. Shade
- 1950:Gabriel Lasker, J. L. Angel
- 1951: Gabriel Lasker, W. L. Straus, Jr.
- 1952: James Spuhler
- 1953-1961: Gabriel Lasker
- 1962: J. Kelso, Gabriel Lasker
- 1963: J. Kelso, Gabriel Lasker, S. T. Brooks
- 1964-1965 Santiago Genovés, S. T. Brooks, Gabriel Lasker
- 1966-1967: Santiago Genovés, S. T. Brooks, Gabriel Lasker
- 1968-1971: J. Buettner-Janusch
- 1978-1981: K. A. Bennett
- 1982-1986: Robert M. Malina
- 1987-1992: Emőke Szathmáry
- 1993-1997: A.T. Steegmann, Jr.
- 1998- 2002: Christopher B. Ruff
- 2003-2007: Sara Stintson
- 2008-2012: Robert W. Sussman
- 2013-2018: Trudy R. Turner
- 2019-2023: Lyle R. Konigsberg
- 2024-2028: Sheela Athreya & Graciela S. Cabana
