= Peter T. Ellison =

American anthropologist

- Born: 1951 (age 74–75)
- Education: St. John's College; University of Vermont; University of Massachusetts; Harvard University
- Partner: Priscilla "Pippi" née Lindsay
- Scientific career
- Institutions: Harvard University

Peter Thorpe Ellison (born 1951) is an American anthropologist who researches human reproductive ecology. His work has been recognized with a Guggenheim Fellowship and membership of the National Academy of Sciences, among other honors. He has also served as the editor-in-chief of the American Journal of Human Biology and American Journal of Physical Anthropology and editor of Annual Review of Anthropology.

== Early life and education ==
Peter Thorpe Ellison was born in 1951 to parents John W. Ellison, an Episcopal reverend, and Mary née Thorpe. He initially went to St. John's College in Annapolis, Maryland, where he at first majored in humanities. Upon reading Darwin's On the Origin of Species, he became more interested in biology and transferred to the University of Vermont, finishing his undergraduate degree in 1975. He graduated from the University of Massachusetts with his master's degree in 1980. He later attended Harvard University for his PhD.

== Career ==
Ellison researches how the human reproductive system interacts with external factors, which is known as human reproductive ecology. After finishing his PhD, he accepted a position in 1983 to remain at Harvard, where he currently works. He has served as the chair of Department of Anthropology and dean of the Graduate School of Arts and Sciences at different points.

He has been the editor-in-chief of several academic journals, including the American Journal of Human Biology, Annual Review of Anthropology, and American Journal of Physical Anthropology. He has authored or edited several books, including Reproductive Ecology and Human Evolution (2001), On Fertile Ground (2001), and Endocrinology of Social Relationships (2009).

== Awards and honors ==
In 1998 he was awarded a Guggenheim Fellowship for his research. He was elected as a member of the National Academy of Sciences in 2006. In 2019 he received the Franz Boas Lifetime Achievement Award from the Human Biology Association. He is also a fellow of the American Association for the Advancement of Science.

== Personal life ==
His wife, Priscilla "Pippi" née Lindsay, also attended St. John's, which is where they met as freshman. They were married at age 21 and both transferred to the University of Vermont.
