= High-altitude adaptation in humans =

Certain human populations around the world have the natural ability to survive and live comfortably at high altitudes as a result of evolutionary adaptation, which causes irreversible and long-term physiological responses to high-altitude environments associated with heritable behavioural and genetic changes. These populations are indigenous inhabitants of highly elevated regions on Earth, including Tibet and the Andes, and hence thrive in conditions that would cause the rest of the human population to suffer serious health consequences. The capability, or lack thereof, to sustain oneself at a high elevation without the aid of specialized devices (such as a breathing apparatus) is particularly due to structural and functional differences in the regulatory systems of oxygen respiration and blood circulation.

Around 81.6 million people (roughly 1.1% of the global population) live permanently at altitudes above 2,500 metres (8,200 ft) and as high as 5,100 metres (16,700 ft). Extended exposure to an environment higher than 2,500 metres (8,200 ft) above sea level normally induces chronic mountain sickness in humans, but many of the populations occupying permanent settlements at high altitudes throughout South America, South Asia, and East Africa have experienced these conditions for millennia without any apparent complications. This special adaptation is now recognized as an example of natural selection in action. The high-altitude adaptation of the Tibetan people is the fastest known example of human evolution, as it is estimated to have occurred in a span of less than 3,000 years at some point between 7000 BCE and 1000 BCE.

== Origin and basis ==
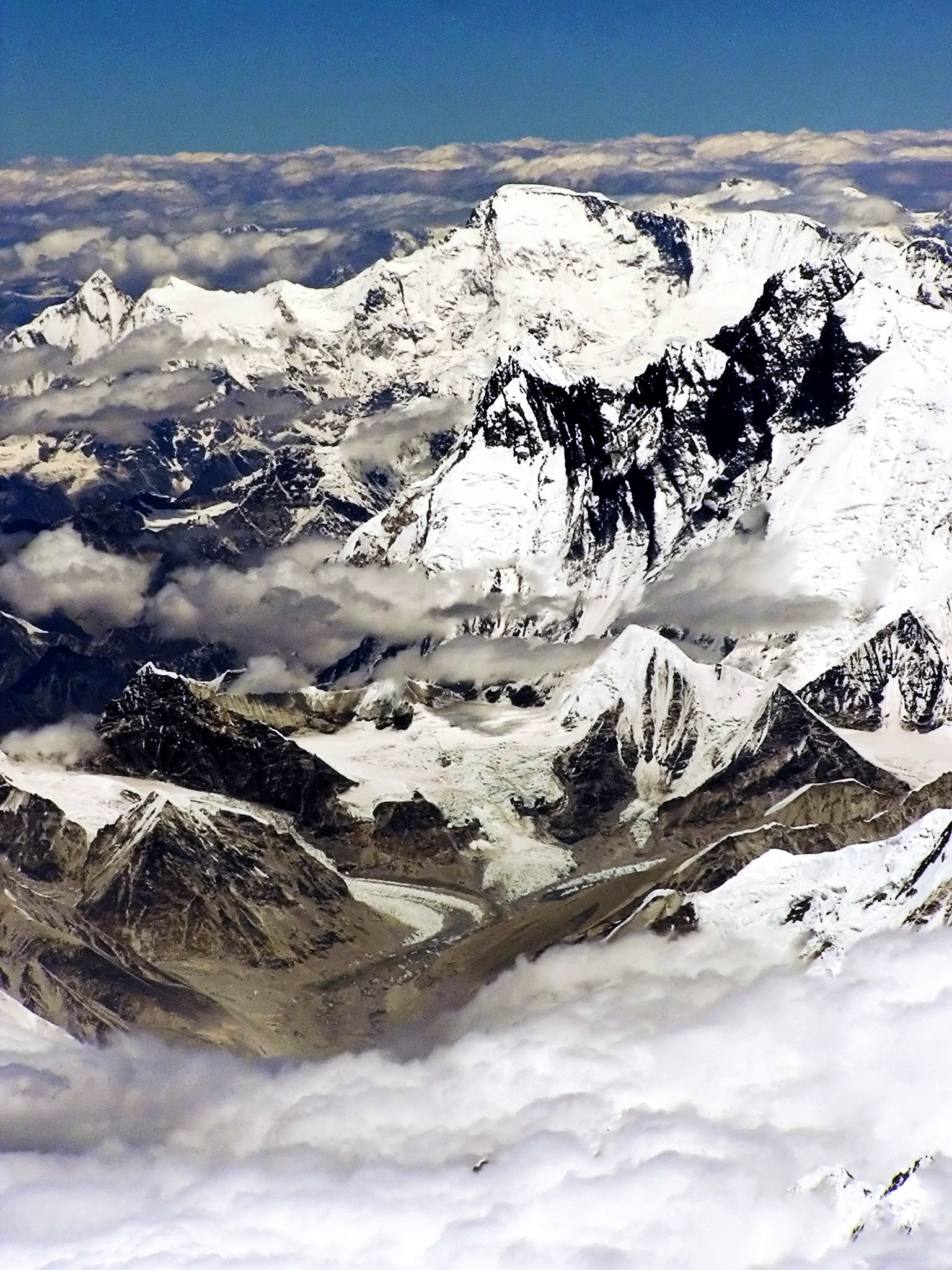
Himalayas, on the southern rim of the Tibetan Plateau

Humans are generally adapted to lowland environments where oxygen is abundant. At altitudes above 2,500 meters (8,200 ft), such humans experience altitude sickness, which is a type of hypoxia, a clinical syndrome of severe lack of oxygen. Some humans develop the illness beginning at above 1,500 meters (5,000 ft). Symptoms include fatigue, dizziness, breathlessness, headaches, insomnia, malaise, nausea, vomiting, body pain, loss of appetite, ear-ringing, blistering and purpling of the hands and feet, and dilated blood vessels.

The sickness is compounded by related symptoms such as cerebral oedema (swelling of brain) and pulmonary oedema (fluid accumulation in lungs). Over a span of multiple days, individuals experiencing the effects of high-altitude hypoxia demonstrate raised respiratory activity and elevated metabolic conditions which persist during periods of rest. Subsequently, afflicted people will experience slowly declining heart rate. Hypoxia is a primary contributor to fatalities within mountaineering groups, making it a significant risk factor within high-altitude related challenges. In women, pregnancy can be severely affected, such as development of preeclampsia, which causes premature labor, low birth weight of babies, and often complicates with profuse bleeding, seizures, or death of the mother.

An estimated 81.6 million humans live at an elevation higher than 2,500 meters (8,200 ft) above sea level, of which 21.7 million reside in Ethiopia, 12.5 million in China, 11.7 million in Colombia, 7.8 million in Peru, and 6.2 million in Bolivia. Certain natives of Tibet, Ethiopia, and the Andes have been living at these high altitudes for generations and are resistant to hypoxia as a consequence of genetic adaptation. It is estimated that at 4,000 meters (13,000 ft) altitude, every lungful of air has approximately 60% of the oxygen molecules found in a lungful of air at sea level. Highlanders are thus constantly exposed to a low oxygen environment, yet they live without any debilitating problems.

One of the best-documented effects of high altitude on non-adapted women is a progressive reduction in birth weight. By contrast, the women of long-resident, high-altitude populations are known to give birth to heavier-weight infants than women of the lowland. This is particularly true among Tibetan babies, whose average birth weight is 294–650 g (~470 g) heavier than those of the surrounding Chinese population, and their blood-oxygen level is considerably higher.

Scientific investigation of high-altitude adaptation was initiated by A. Roberto Frisancho of the University of Michigan in the late 1960s among the Quechua people of Peru. Paul T. Baker of Penn State University's Department of Anthropology also conducted a considerable amount of research into human adaptation to high altitudes, and mentored students who continued this research. One of these students, anthropologist Cynthia Beall of Case Western Reserve University, began conducting decades-long research on high altitude adaptation among the Tibetans in the early 1980s.

== Physiological basis ==
Among the different native highlander populations, the underlying physiological responses to adaptation differ. For example, among four quantitative features, such as resting ventilation, hypoxic ventilatory response, oxygen saturation, and hemoglobin concentration, the levels of variations are significantly different between the Tibetans and the Aymaras. Methylation also influences oxygenation.

=== Tibetans ===
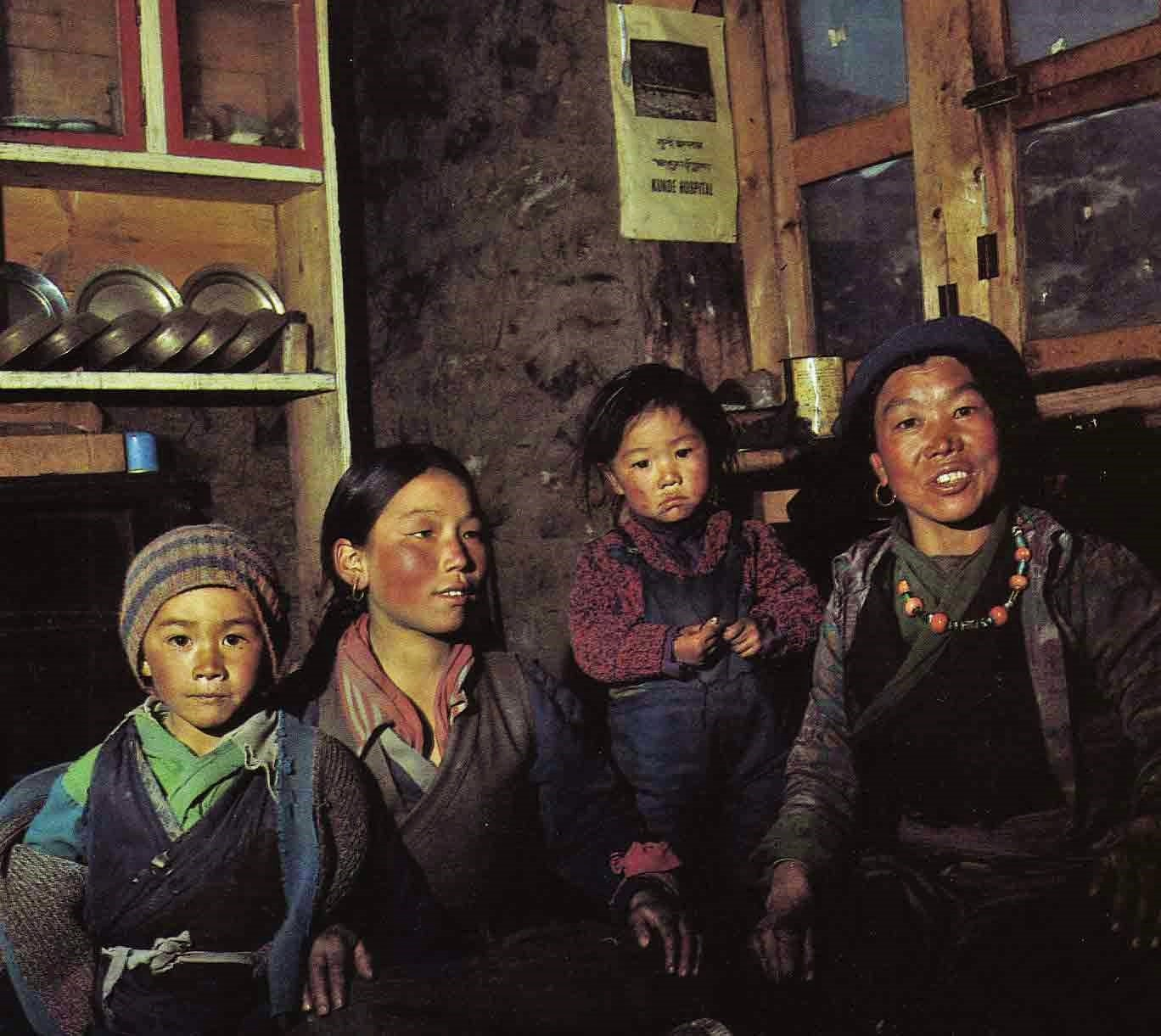
A Sherpa family

In the early 20th century, researchers observed the impressive physical abilities of Tibetans during Himalayan climbing expeditions. They considered the possibility that these abilities resulted from an evolutionary genetic adaptation to high-altitude conditions. The Tibetan Plateau has an average elevation of 4,000 meters (13,000 ft) above sea level and covers more than 2.5 million km^{2}; it is the highest and largest plateau in the world. In 1990, it was estimated that 4,594,188 Tibetans live on the plateau, with 53% living at an altitude over 3,500 meters (11,500 ft). Fairly large numbers (approximately 600,000) live at an altitude exceeding 4,500 meters (14,800 ft) in the Chantong (Changtang)-Qingnan area. Recent studies in 2025 have demonstrated a molecular convergence between this evolutionary adaptation and oncology, revealing that up to 90% of certain chronically hypoxic tumors utilize the same EPAS1 gene mutations found in Sherpas to survive and grow in oxygen-depleted environments.

Tibetans who have been living in the Chantong-Qingnan area for 3,000 years do not exhibit the same elevated hemoglobin concentrations to cope with oxygen deficiency that are observed in other populations who have moved temporarily or permanently to high altitudes. Instead, the Tibetans inhale more air with each breath and breathe more rapidly than either sea-level populations or Andeans. Tibetans have better oxygenation at birth, enlarged lung volumes throughout life, and a higher capacity for exercise. They show a sustained increase in cerebral blood flow, lower hemoglobin concentration, and less susceptibility to chronic mountain sickness than other populations due to their longer history of high-altitude habitation.

With the proper physical preparation, individuals can develop short-term tolerance to high-altitude conditions. However, these biological changes are temporary and will reverse upon returning to lower elevations. Moreover, while lowland people typically experience increased breathing for only a few days after entering high altitudes, Tibetans maintain this rapid breathing and elevated lung capacity throughout their lifetime. This enables them to inhale large amounts of air per unit of time to compensate for low oxygen levels. Additionally, Tibetans typically have significantly higher levels of nitric oxide in their blood, often double that of lowlanders. This likely contributes to enhanced blood circulation by promoting vasodilation.

Furthermore, their hemoglobin level is not significantly different (average 15.6 g/dl in males and 14.2 g/dl in females) from those of humans living at low altitude. This is evidenced by mountaineers experiencing an increase of over 2 g/dl in hemoglobin levels within two weeks at the Mount Everest base camp. Consequently, Tibetans demonstrate the capacity to mitigate the effects of hypoxia and mountain sickness throughout their lives. Even when ascending extraordinarily high peaks such as Mount Everest, they exhibit consistent oxygen uptake, heightened ventilation, augmented hypoxic ventilatory responses, expanded lung volumes, increased diffusing capacities, stable body weight, and improved sleep quality compared to lowland populations.

=== Andeans ===
In contrast to the Tibetans, Andean highlanders show different patterns of hemoglobin adaptation. Their hemoglobin concentration is higher than those of the lowlander population, which also happens to lowlanders who move to high altitudes. When they spend some weeks in the lowlands, their hemoglobin drops to the same levels as lowland humans. However, in contrast to lowland humans, they have increased oxygen levels in their hemoglobin; that is, more oxygen per blood volume. This confers an ability to carry more oxygen in each red blood cell, meaning a more effective transport of oxygen throughout their bodies. This enables Andeans to overcome hypoxia and normally reproduce without risk of death for the mother or baby. They have developmentally-acquired enlarged residual lung volume and an associated increase in alveolar area, which are supplemented with increased tissue thickness and moderate increase in red blood cells. Though Andean highlander children show delayed body growth, change in lung volume is accelerated.

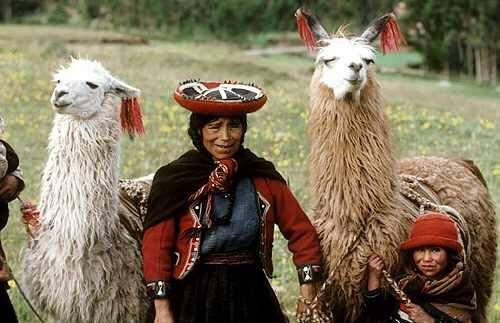
Quechua woman with llamas

Among the Quechua people of the Altiplano, there is a significant variation in NOS3 (the gene encoding endothelial nitric oxide synthase, eNOS), which is associated with higher levels of nitric oxide at high altitude. Nuñoa children of Quechua ancestry exhibit higher blood-oxygen content (91.3) and lower heart rate (84.8) than their peers of different ethnicities, who have an average of 89.9 blood-oxygen and 88–91 heart rate. Quechua women have comparatively enlarged lung volume for increased respiration.

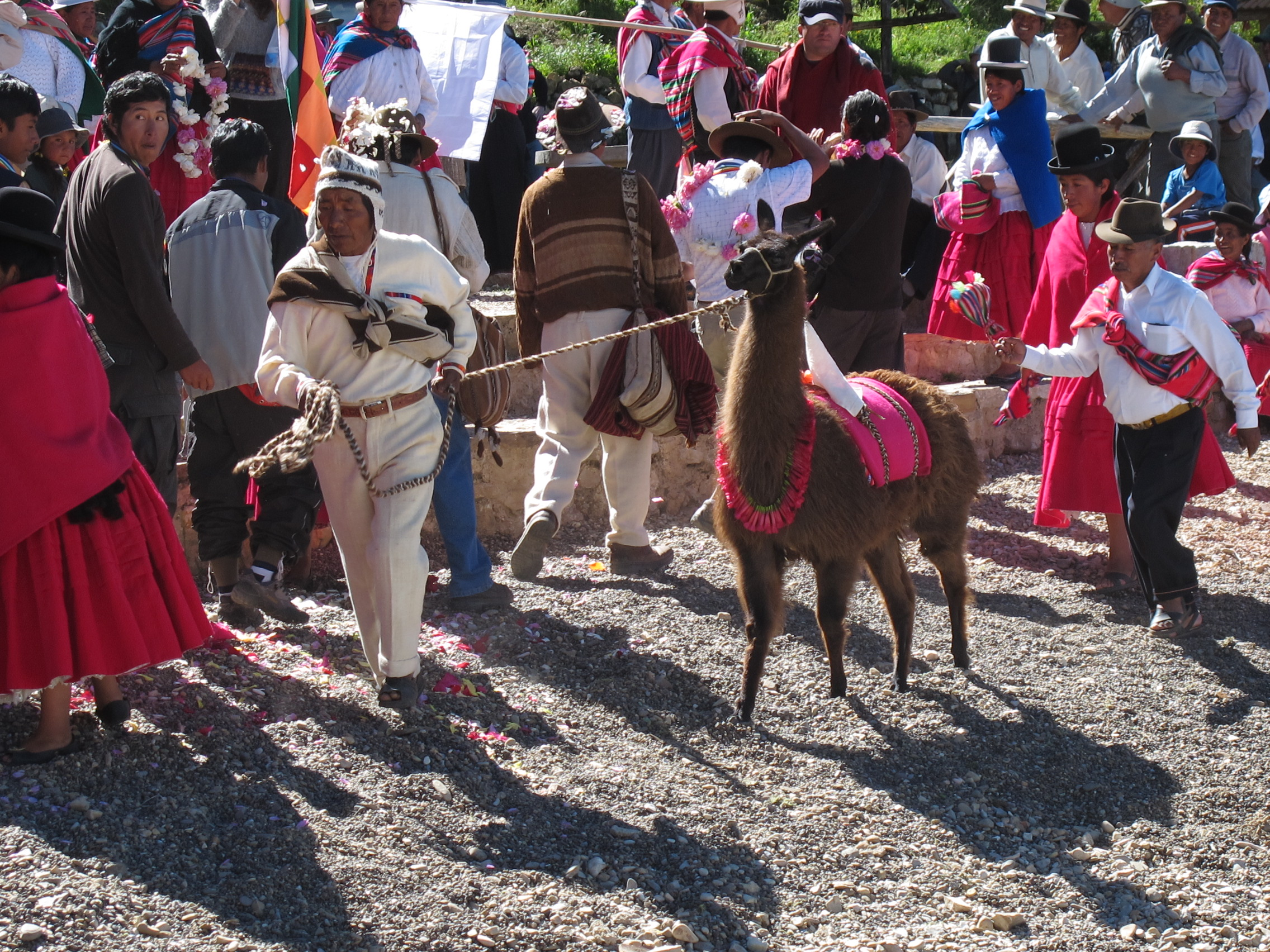
Aymara ceremony

Blood profile comparisons show that among the Andeans, Aymaran highlanders are better adapted to highlands than the Quechuas. Among the Bolivian Aymara people, the resting ventilation and hypoxic ventilatory response were quite low (roughly 1.5 times lower) compared to those of the Tibetans. The intrapopulation genetic variation was relatively smaller among the Aymara people. Moreover, when compared to Tibetans, blood hemoglobin levels at high altitudes among Aymarans is notably higher, with an average of 19.2 g/dl for males and 17.8 g/dl for females.

=== Amharas ===
The people of the Amhara region also live at extremely high altitudes, around 3,000 meters (9,800 ft) to 3,500 meters (11,500 ft). Highland Amharas exhibit elevated hemoglobin levels, like Andeans and lowlander humans at high altitudes, but do not exhibit the Andeans' increase in oxygen content of hemoglobin. Among healthy individuals, the average hemoglobin concentrations are 15.9 and 15.0 g/dl for males and females, respectively (which is lower than normal, similar to the Tibetans), and an average oxygen saturation of hemoglobin is 95.3% (which is higher than average, like the Andeans). Additionally, Amhara highlanders do not exhibit any significant change in blood circulation of the brain, which has been observed among the Peruvian highlanders and attributed to their frequent altitude-related illnesses. Yet, similar to the Andeans and Tibetans, the Amhara highlanders are immune to the extreme dangers posed by high-altitude environment, and their pattern of adaptation is unique from that of other highland people.

== Genetic basis ==
The underlying molecular evolution of high-altitude adaptation has been explored in recent years. Depending on geographical and environmental pressures, high-altitude adaptation involves different genetic patterns, some of which have evolved not long ago. For example, Tibetan adaptations became prevalent in the past 3,000 years, an example of rapid recent human evolution. At the turn of the 21st century, it was reported that the genetic makeup of the respiratory components of the Tibetan and the Amhara populations were significantly different.

=== Tibetans ===
Substantial evidence from Tibetan highlanders suggests that variation in hemoglobin and blood-oxygen levels are adaptive as Darwinian fitness. It has been documented that Tibetan women with a high likelihood of possessing one to two alleles for high blood-oxygen content (which is rare in other women) had more surviving children; the higher the oxygen capacity, the lower the infant mortality. In 2010, for the first time, the genes responsible for the unique adaptive traits were identified following genome sequencing of 50 Tibetans and 40 Han Chinese from Beijing. Initially, the strongest signal of natural selection was a transcription factor involved in response to hypoxia, called endothelial Per-Arnt-Sim (PAS) domain protein 1 (EPAS1). It was found that one single-nucleotide polymorphism (SNP) at EPAS1 shows a 78% frequency difference between Tibetan and mainland Chinese samples, representing the fastest genetic change observed in any human gene to date. Hence, Tibetan adaptation to high altitude is recognized as one of the fastest processes of phenotypically observable evolution in humans, which is estimated to have occurred a few thousand years ago, when the Tibetans split from the mainland Chinese population. The time of genetic divergence has been variously estimated as 2,750 (original estimate), 4,725, 8,000, or 9,000 years ago.

Mutations in EPAS1 occur at a higher frequency in Tibetans than their Han neighbors and correlate with decreased hemoglobin concentrations among the Tibetans. This is known as the hallmark of their adaptation to hypoxia. Simultaneously, two genes, egl nine homolog 1 (EGLN1), which inhibits hemoglobin production under high oxygen concentration, and peroxisome proliferator-activated receptor alpha (PPARA), were also identified to be positively selected for decreased hemoglobin levels in the Tibetans.

Similarly, the Sherpas, known for their Himalayan hardiness, exhibit similar patterns in the EPAS1 gene, which is further evidence that the gene is under selection pressure for adaptation to the high-altitude life of Tibetans. A study in 2014 indicates that the mutant EPAS1 gene could have been inherited from archaic hominins, the Denisovans. EPAS1 and EGLN1 are believed to be important genes for unique adaptive traits when compared with those of the Chinese and Japanese. Comparative genome analysis in 2014 revealed that the Tibetans inherited an equal mixture of genomes from the Nepalese Sherpas and Hans, and that they acquired adaptive genes from the Sherpa lineage. Further, the population split was estimated to occur around 20,000 to 40,000 years ago, a range supported by archaeological, mitochondrial DNA, and Y chromosome evidence for an initial colonization of the Tibetan plateau around 30,000 years ago.

The genes EPAS1, EGLN1, and PPARA function in concert with another gene named hypoxia inducible factors (HIF), which is in turn a principal regulator of red blood cell production (erythropoiesis) in response to oxygen metabolism. The genes are associated not only with decreased hemoglobin levels, but also with regulating metabolism. EPAS1 is significantly associated with increased lactate concentration, a product of anaerobic glycolysis, and PPARA is correlated with decrease in the activity of fatty acid oxidation. EGLN1 codes for an enzyme, prolyl hydroxylase 2 (PHD2), which is involved in erythropoiesis.

Among the Tibetans, a mutation in EGLN1 (specifically at position 12, where cytosine is replaced with guanine; and at 380, where G is replaced with C) results in mutant PHD2 (aspartic acid at position 4 becomes glutamine, and cysteine at 127 becomes serine) and this mutation inhibits erythropoiesis. This mutation is estimated to have occurred approximately 8,000 years ago. Further, the Tibetans are enriched for genes in the disease class of human reproduction (such as genes from the DAZ, BPY2, CDY, and HLA-DQ and HLA-DR gene clusters) and biological process categories of response to DNA damage stimulus and DNA repair (such as RAD51, RAD52, and MRE11A), which are related to the adaptive traits of high infant birth weight and darker skin tone and are most likely due to recent local adaptation.

=== Andeans ===
The patterns of genetic adaptation among the Andeans are largely distinct from those of the Tibetans, with both populations showing evidence of positive natural selection in different genes or gene regions. For genes in the HIF pathway, EGLN1 is the only instance where evidence of positive selection is observed in both Tibetans and Andeans. Even then, the pattern of variation for this gene differs between the two populations. Furthermore, there are no significant associations between EPAS1 or EGLN1 single nucleotide polymorphism genotypes and hemoglobin concentration among the Andeans, which is characteristic of the Tibetans.

The Andean pattern of adaptation is characterized by selection in a number of genes involved in cardiovascular development and function (such as BRINP3, EDNRA, NOS2A). This suggests that selection in Andeans, instead of targeting the HIF pathway like in the Tibetans, focused on adaptations of the cardiovascular system to combat chronic disease at high altitude. Analysis of ancient Andean genomes, some dating back 7,000 years, discovered selection in DST, a gene involved in cardiovascular function. The whole genome sequences of 20 Andeans (half of them having chronic mountain sickness) revealed that two genes, SENP1 (an erythropoiesis regulator) and ANP32D (an oncogene) play vital roles in their weak adaptation to hypoxia.

=== Amharas ===
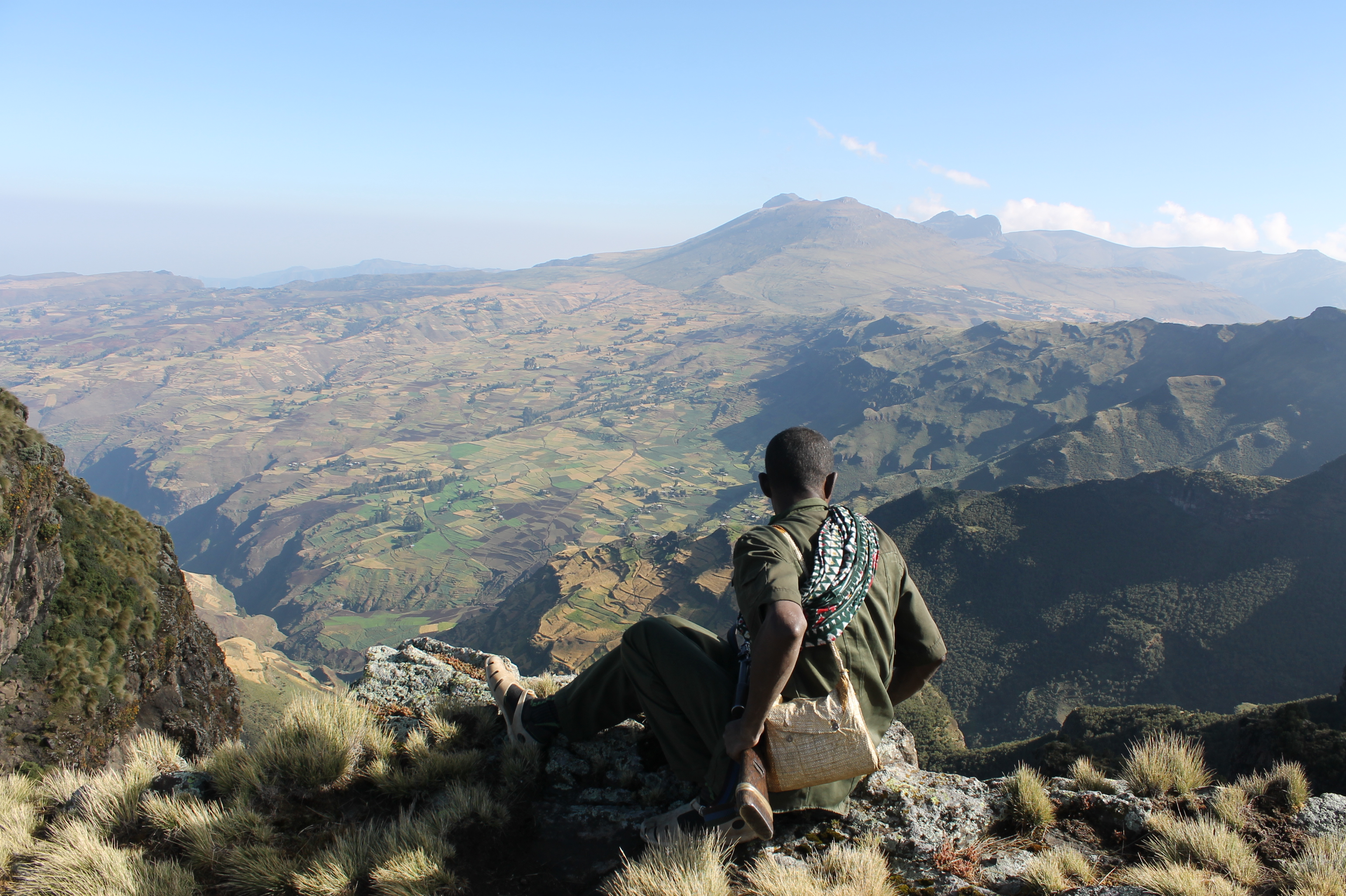
Scout rests at the Ras Bwahit ascension

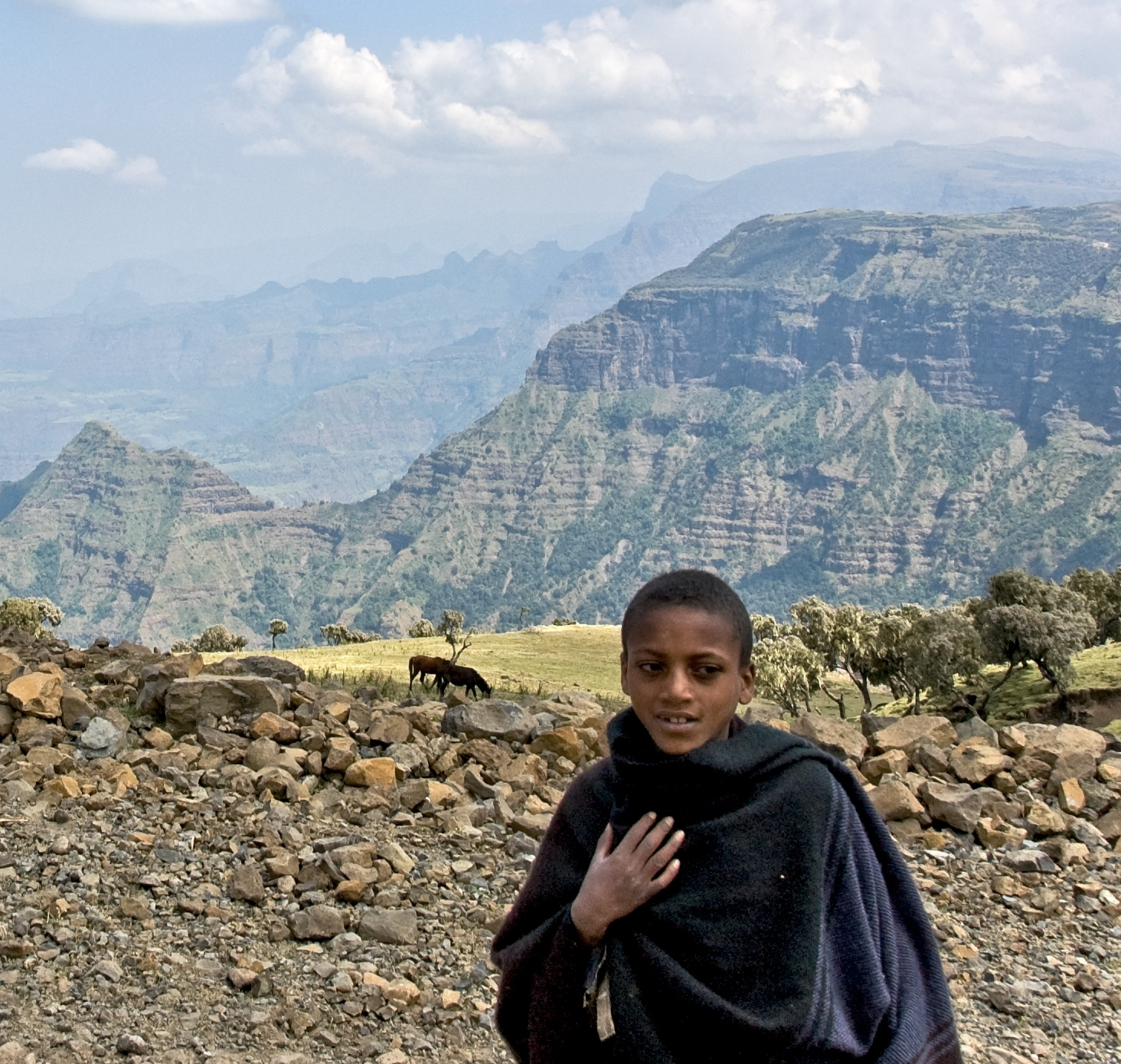
Herder, Simien Mountains

The adaptive mechanism of Ethiopian highlanders differs from those of the Tibetans and Andeans due to the fact that their migration to the highland was relatively early. For example, the Amhara have inhabited altitudes above 2,500 meters (8,200 ft) for at least 5,000 years and altitudes around 2,000 meters (6,600 ft) to 2,400 meters (7,900 ft) for more than 70,000 years. Genomic analysis of two ethnic groups, Amhara and Oromo, has revealed that gene variations associated with hemoglobin difference among Tibetans or other variants at the exact gene location do not influence the adaptation in Ethiopians. Several candidate genes have been identified as possible explanations for the adaptation of Ethiopians, including MICU1, VAV3, ARNT2 and THRB. Two of these genes (THRB and ARNT2) are known to play a role in the HIF-1 pathway, a pathway implicated in previous work reported in Tibetan and Andean studies. This supports the hypothesis that adaptation to high altitude arose independently among different highlander populations as a result of convergent evolution.

== See also ==
- Altitude
- Effects of high altitude on humans (including acclimatisation)
- High-altitude adaptation
- High-altitude football controversy
- Tibetan Plateau
