= Trudy Turner =

American anthropologist

Trudy Rebecca Turner
- Education: New York University, Graduate School
- Scientific career
- Thesis: Biological variation in vervet monkeys (C̲e̲r̲c̲o̲p̲i̲t̲h̲e̲c̲u̲s̲ a̲e̲t̲h̲i̲o̲p̲s̲) (1977)

Trudy Turner is a Distinguished Professor Emeritus at the University of Wisconsin–Milwaukee and the editor-in-chief of the American Journal of Physical Anthropology. She is known for her work on vervet monkeys, ethics in research, and women in biological anthropology.

== Education and career ==
Turner has a B.A. from Northwestern University (1970), and earned her M.A. (1973) and Ph.D. (1977) from New York University. She conducted her postdoctoral work at the University of Michigan Medical School, and then moved to the University of Wisconsin-Milwaukee in 1987 and was promoted to professor in 1998. As of 2024 she is a Distinguished Professor Emeritus at the University of Wisconsin–Milwaukee.

In 2019 she was named editor-in-chief of the American Journal of Physical Anthropology.

== Research ==
Turner is known for her work on Primates, with a focus on the vervet monkey. Her early work examined blood proteins and growth stages in vervet monkeys. She was a part of the team that sequenced the genome for the vervet monkey. She has also examined ethics in population biology research and examined the experiences of women in the field of biological anthropology.

== Selected publications ==
- Turner, T. R.; Anapol, F.; Jolly, C. J. (1997). "Growth, development, and sexual dimorphism in vervet monkeys (Cercopithecus aethiops) at four sites in Kenya". American Journal of Physical Anthropology. 103 (1): 19–35. doi:10.1002/(SICI)1096-8644(199705)103:1<19::AID-AJPA3>3.0.CO;2-8.
- Turner, Trudy R. (2005-01-01). Biological Anthropology and Ethics. Albany, NY: SUNY Press. ISBN 978-0-7914-6296-6.
- Turner, Trudy R.; Bernstein, Robin M.; Taylor, Andrea B.; Asangba, Abigail; Bekelman, Traci; Cramer, Jennifer Danzy; Elton, Sarah; Harvati, Katerina; Williams-Hatala, Erin Marie; Kauffman, Laurie; Middleton, Emily; Richtsmeier, Joan; Szathmáry, Emőke; Torres-Rouff, Christina; Thayer, Zaneta (2018). "Participation, representation, and shared experiences of women scholars in biological anthropology". American Journal of Physical Anthropology. 165 (S65): 126–157. doi:10.1002/ajpa.23386. ISSN 0002-9483.
- Turner, Trudy R.; Schmitt, Christopher A.; Cramer, Jennifer Danzy (2019). Savanna monkeys: the genus Chlorocebus. Cambridge, United Kingdom: Cambridge University Press. ISBN 978-0-521-78294-4.

== Awards and honors ==
In 2014 Turner received the Gabriel Lasker Lifetime Achievement Award for Outstanding Service to the American Association of Physical Anthropology.
