= Frank Livingstone =

Frank Livingstone may refer to:

- Frank Livingstone (bowls) (1886–1966), New Zealand lawn bowls player
- Frank B. Livingstone (1928–2005), American biological anthropologist
