= John Relethford =

American anthropologist

- Born: John Henry Relethford
- Education: State University of New York at Albany (Ph.D., 1980)
- Awards: 2017 Gabriel Lasker Distinguished Service Award from the American Association of Physical Anthropologists
- Scientific career
- Fields: Biological anthropology
- Institutions: State University of New York at Oneonta
- Thesis: Population structure and anthropometric variation in rural Western Ireland (1980)

John H. Relethford is an American biological anthropologist and Distinguished Teaching Professor in the Department of Anthropology at the State University of New York at Oneonta (SUNY Oneonta). He is also an adjunct professor at Binghamton University.

== Education and career ==
Relethford received his Ph.D. from the State University of New York at Albany in 1980. Before joining SUNY Oneonta, he was a postdoctoral researcher in the Department of Genetics at the Southwest Foundation for Biomedical Research. He was named a Distinguished Teaching Professor in 1998. From 2006 to 2007, he was the president of the American Association of Physical Anthropologists.

== Research ==
Relethford's research focuses on human population genetics and the evolutionary origin of modern humans. For example, he has proposed his own version of the "Out of Africa" model, the standard theory for the evolution of modern humans; he has described his model as placing human origins "mostly out of Africa".

== Honors and awards ==
Relethford received the Chancellor's Award for Excellence in Teaching in 1994–1995, and the first recipient of SUNY Oneonta's Susan Sutton Smith Prize for Academic Excellence in 1995. In 2001, he was elected a fellow of the American Association for the Advancement of Science. In 2017, he received the American Association of Physical Anthropologists' Gabriel Lasker Distinguished Service Award.
