= Thelma Shoher Baker =

American educator (1924–2021)

- Born: Thelma Mary Shoher; April 6, 1924; Jamaica Plain, Massachusetts, U.S.
- Died: January 5, 2021 (aged 96); Chapel Hill, North Carolina, U.S.
- Occupations: Educator, college professor
- Spouse: Paul T. Baker

Thelma Shoher Baker (April 6, 1924 – January 5, 2021) was an American educator and anthropologist, on the faculty of the Pennsylvania State University from the 1970s until her retirement in 1986.

== Early life and education ==
Shoher was born in Jamaica Plain, Massachusetts, the daughter of Jewish emigrants Abraham Shoher and Tamara "Tillie" Kramer Shoher, respectively from Odesa (now Ukraine) and Dvinsk (now Daugavpils, Latvia). She graduated from Girls' Latin School in 1941. She attended the University of Miami, and completed undergraduate studies in psychology at the University of New Mexico in 1951. After her children were born, she earned a master's degree from the Penn State College of Human Development in 1966, and an EdD from the Pennsylvania State University (Penn State), with a dissertation titled Environmental Education: A Multinational Study of Curriculum Innovation in Higher Education (1978).

== Career ==
Shoher was an instructor and research assistant, and later an assistant professor of anthropology at Penn State, from the 1970s until her retirement in 1986. She edited a special issue of the Journal of General Education in 1977. In 1985, she gave an invited lecture at the University of Hawai'i, on "Changing Attitudes Toward the Elderly: A Samoan Case Study", and consulted on anthropology projects of the Indian Statistical Institute's Anthropometry and Human Genetics Unit. She and her husband did anthropological fieldwork in the Peruvian Andes and American Samoa, sometimes with their four children in tow. In addition to her own research, she co-authored work with her husband, and informally contributed to his career as a reader, editor, and social hostess.

== Personal life and death ==
Thelma Shoher married biological anthropologist and World War II veteran Paul Thornell Baker in 1949. They had four children. Her husband died in 2007, after many years with Alzheimer's disease, and Shoher died from COVID-19 in Chapel Hill, North Carolina, on January 5, 2021, at the age of 96.

== Publications ==
- The Urbanization of Man; A Social Science Perspective (edited collection, 1972)
- "Altitude, migration, and fertility in the Andes" (article, 1974, with Paul T. Baker and Andrew E. Abelson)
- "The Effects of High Altitude on Adolescent Growth in Southern Peruvian Amerindians" (article, 1977, with Paul T. Baker, Cynthia M. Beall, and Jere D. Haas)
- The Changing Samoans: Behavior and Health in Transition (1986, with Paul T. Baker and Joel M. Hanna)
