= Human Biology Association =

Learned society devoted to human biology

- Formation: November 19, 1973; 52 years ago
- Founder: Gabriel Lasker
- Type: Non-profit and scientific
- Purpose: Promotion of studies in human biology
- Headquarters: Washington, D.C.
- Location: US
- Products: American Journal of Human Biology
- Fields: Human biology
- Secretary General: Elizabeth Miller
- President: Josh Snodgrass
- Website: www.humbio.org
- Formerly called: Human Biology Council (till 1994)

The Human Biology Association (HBA), established as the Human Biology Council in 1973, is a scientific and nonprofit organization for the promotion of studies in human biology. It is headquartered at Washington, D.C., US. Its official journal American Journal of Human Biology is published by Wiley. In the past it had also supported the publication of Human Biology, which was the main reason for its establishment.

== History ==
In 1963, the journal Human Biology founded by Raymond Pearl in 1929, was adopted as the official publication by the Society for the Study of Human Biology (SSHB). However, the society, operating in England, found it difficult to manage a publication by Wayne State University Press in Michigan, US, and decided to create its own journal. In 1973, it withdrew from the publication of Human Biology and created Annals of Human Biology that was launched the next year.

The editor of Human Biology Gabriel Lasker quickly felt the need for a supporting society, the concept of which was discussed at the meeting of the American Association of Physical Anthropologists in April 1973. With the support and influence of Paul T. Baker, previous president of ASPA, the Human Biology Council was established on 19 November 1973. The society approved to support Human Biology, which bore the title description "Official Publication of the Human Biology Council" from the December issue of 1974. Baker became the first president, and Lasker continued as the editor.

In 1994, the Department of Consumer and Regulatory Affairs in the District of Columbia formally approved the society which changed its name to Human Biology Association, on 30 March.

== Publications ==
The HBA continued to publish Human Biology until 1987, when the Wayne State University Press changed its publication policies upon which the society decided to withdraw the support. It created a new American Journal of Human Biology in 1989, with Francis E. Johnston as the editor and Wiley as the publisher.

== Awards provided ==
The HBA gives the following awards:

1. The Raymond Pearl Memorial Lecture, established in 1983.
2. The Franz Boas Distinguished Achievement Award.
3. The Michael A. Little Early Career Award, established in 2013.
4. International Travel Award, given to international members.
5. Human Biology Association Book Award, since 2020.
6. Student awards such as the Spielvogel Award, the E. E. Hunt and Phyllis Eveleth Awards, and Student Travel Award.
