= American Journal of Human Biology =

- Discipline: Human biology
- Language: English
- Edited by: Lynnette Leidy Sievert

Publication details
- History: 1989–present
- Publisher: Wiley-Liss (United States)
- Frequency: Bimonthly
- Impact factor: 1.937 (2020)

Standard abbreviations
- ISO 4: Am. J. Hum. Biol.

Indexing
- CODEN: AJHUES
- ISSN: 1042-0533 (print); 1520-6300 (web)
- OCLC no.: 18924802

Links
- Journal homepage

The American Journal of Human Biology is a peer-reviewed scientific journal covering human biology. It is the official publication of the Human Biology Association (formerly known as the Human Biology Council). The journal publishes original research, theoretical articles, reviews, and other communications connected to all aspects of human biology, health and disease.

According to the Journal Citation Reports, the journal has a 2020 impact factor of 1.937, ranking it 32nd out of 93 journals in the category "Anthropology" and 55th out of 93 journals in the category "Biology".
