= Susan C. Antón =

American anthropologist

- Born: January 2, 1964 (age 62)
- Education: University of California, Berkeley (B.A., M.A., and Ph.D.)
- Occupations: Biological anthropologist, paleoanthropologist, professor

Susan C. Antón (born January 2, 1964) is an American biological anthropologist and paleoanthropologist. She is a professor at New York University and fellow of the American Academy of Arts and Sciences.

== Education ==
Antón graduated with B.A. in Anthropology at the University of California, Berkeley in 1987. She remained at Berkeley for further study, receiving her M.A. and Ph.D. in anthropology in 1991 and 1994, respectively. She worked as a curator on skull collections during her studies.

== Career ==
Antón's assumed her first academic position as an assistant professor at the University of Florida in 1994. She left Florida for an assistant professorship at Rutgers University and an appointment as a research associate at the California Academy of Sciences. She joined New York University as an associate professor in 2003 and was promoted to full professorship in 2011.

She was a co-editor of the Journal of Human Evolution from 2005 to 2010 and associate editor from 2011 onwards.

She was elected fellow of the American Association for the Advancement of Science and fellow of the American Academy of Arts and Sciences in 2008 and 2020, respectively. The American Association of Physical Anthropologists made her president-elect for 2014.
