= Clark Spencer Larsen =

American biological anthropologist

- Born: 1952 (age 73–74); Omaha, Nebraska, U.S.
- Occupations: Biological anthropologist; author; educator

Academic background
- Education: Kansas State University (B.A.); University of Michigan (M.A., Ph.D.)
- Doctoral advisor: Milford H. Wolpoff

Academic work
- Institutions: Ohio State University
- Main interests: Bioarchaeology

Clark Spencer Larsen (born 1952) is an American biological anthropologist, author, and educator. His work focuses on bioarchaeology, the study of human remains from archaeological settings. Although his interests span the entire record of human evolution, his research largely pertains to the last 10,000 years, a period of dynamic change in health, well-being, and lifestyle, much of which relates to population increase, overcrowding, and nutritional decline that co-occurred with the transition from hunting and gathering to agriculture, creating living conditions that humans are grappling with to the present day.

== Early life and education ==
Larsen was born in Omaha, Nebraska, the middle child of five children, including two older sisters and two younger sisters. He spent most of his childhood in Beatrice, Nebraska, graduating from high school in 1970. His exposure to artifacts and exhibits at the Homestead National Monument's museum near his home town initiated his fascination with all matters ancient. Within weeks of high school graduation, Larsen spent his first archaeological field season on a Nebraska State Historical Society excavation of Fort Atkinson, the first military fort west of the Missouri River. The discovery of human bone fragments at the site that summer captured his interest in the study of archaeological human remains. Larsen attended Kansas State University (BA, Anthropology, 1974), where he studied with archaeologist Patricia J. O'Brien and physical anthropologists William M. Bass III and Michael Finnegan. Following his freshman and sophomore years, he worked with Smithsonian Institution physical anthropologists, Douglas H. Ubelaker and T. Dale Stewart, on field projects in South Dakota (1971) and Maryland (1972) and subsequently with American Museum of Natural History archaeologist David Hurst Thomas in Nevada (1973, 1974). He completed his graduate education at the University of Michigan (MA, Anthropology, 1975; PhD, Biological Anthropology, 1980), studying with Milford H. Wolpoff (advisor), C. Loring Brace, David S. Carlson, Frank B. Livingstone, and Stanley M. Garn.

== Career and impact ==
Soon after entering the graduate program at Michigan, he began working with David Hurst Thomas on St. Catherines Island, Georgia, a project that lead to Larsen's Ph.D. dissertation research on the bioarchaeology of the Georgia coast, documenting the health and lifestyle impacts of the introduction of agriculture and its intensification in later prehistory on native populations. His long-term research program in the American Southeast has been called "...the most comprehensive data for all of North America." This research program is part of a decades-long (1975– ) collaboration with the American Museum of Natural History involving the study of health, dietary, and economic changes prior to and after the arrival of Europeans and the establishment of the mission system in Spanish Florida. He has served as a Research Associate with the American Museum since 1980. Larsen has played a lead role in the study of ancient human remains in other regions of North America (Great Basin, Nevada), at Çatalhöyük (Turkey) (cite Wiki), and Badia Pozzeveri (Tuscany, Italy). He is co-director of the European History of Health Project, tracking health and lifestyle history based on human remains from across Europe over the last 5,000 years with an international collaboration of bioarchaeologists, archaeologists, economic historians, climatologists, and geologists.

Larsen began his professional teaching and research career at the University of Massachusetts, North Dartmouth campus (1979–1983), subsequently moving to Northern Illinois University (1983–1989; chair, 1987–1989), Purdue University (1989–1993), and the University of North Carolina, Chapel Hill (1993–2001). He spent a term (spring, 1999) at the University of California, Berkeley, where he taught bioarchaeology. He was adjunct professor in Evolutionary Anthropology, Duke University (1995–2001). He moved to Ohio State University (2001– ), where he was recruited to chair the Department of Anthropology. Over the course of his tenure as chair (2001–2017), he led the transformation of the department from an unknown unit into a leading program in science-based anthropology, adding nine faculty positions, expanding laboratory facilities, and attracting top students to its undergraduate and graduate programs. In Larsen's role in graduate education, he has directed 28 doctoral students in their dissertation research.

Larsen has played a leadership role in professional societies and in publishing, serving as Vice President (1996–1998) and President (1999–2001) of the American Association of Biological Anthropologists, Chair of the Anthropology section of the American Association for the Advancement of Science (2010–2011), Editor-in-Chief of the American Journal of Physical Anthropology (2001–2007), and founding editor of the book series, Bioarchaeologial Interpretations of the Human Past, for the University Press of Florida (2006– ). Larsen is a member of professional societies including the National Academy of Sciences, American Academy of Arts and Sciences, American Association for the Advancement of Science, the American Association of Biological Anthropologists, and the Society for American Archaeology.

== Honors ==
Larsen has published 35 books and monographs and over 200 articles and contributions to books. His textbook, Our Origins: Discovering Physical Anthropology(W. W. Norton), is a leading introductory textbook, and Bioarchaeology: Interpreting Behavior from the Human Skeleton (Cambridge University Press), the first major synthesis of the field of bioarchaeology.

- 1978–79 Pre-Doctoral Fellowship, Division of Physical Anthropology, National Museum of Natural History, Smithsonian Institution
- 1984 Elected Member, Sigma Xi, the Scientific Research Society
- 1990 Gary Shapiro Memorial Distinguished Lecturer, Museum of Florida History, Tallahassee
- 1999 Amos Hawley Distinguished Term Professor, University of North Carolina, Chapel Hill
- 2000 Marshall Urist Lecturer, Association of Bone and Joint Surgeons
- 2001 Distinguished Professor of Social and Behavioral Sciences, Ohio State University
- 2002 Charles P. Taft Distinguished Lecturer, University of Cincinnati
- 2003 Educational Hall of Fame Award, Beatrice, Nebraska
- 2005–08 National Distinguished Lecturer, Sigma Xi, The Scientific Research Society
- 2006 Elected Fellow, American Association for the Advancement of Science
- 2008 Gabriel W. Lasker Distinguished Service Award, American Association of Biological Anthropologists
- 2016 Elected Member, National Academy of Sciences
- 2017 Distinguished University Professor, Ohio State University
- 2020 Elected Member, American Academy of Arts and Sciences
- 2020 Cozzarelli Prize, Proceedings of the National Academy of Sciences

== Selected works ==
- Clark Spencer Larsen (1982) The Anthropology of St. Catherines Island: 3. Prehistoric Human Biological Adaptation. Anthropological Papers of the American Museum of Natural History 57, part 3. 115 pp.
- Christopher B. Ruff, Clark Spencer Larsen, and Wilson C. Hayes (1984) Structural Changes in the Femur with the Transition to Agriculture on the Georgia Coast. American Journal of Physical Anthropology 64:125–136.
- Clark Spencer Larsen, Margaret J. Schoeninger, Nikolaas J. van der Merwe, Katherine M. Moore, and Julia A. Lee-Thorp (1992) Carbon and Nitrogen Stable Isotopic Signatures of Human Dietary Change in the Georgia Bight. American Journal of Physical Anthropology 89:197–214.
- Clark Spencer Larsen and George R. Milner (editors) (1994) In the Wake of Contact: Biological Responses to Conquest. Wiley-Liss, New York. 216 pp.
- Clark Spencer Larsen (1995) Biological Changes in Human Populations with Agriculture. Annual Review of Anthropology 24:185–213.
- Clark Spencer Larsen (2000) Skeletons in Our Closet: Revealing Our Past through Bioarchaeology. Princeton University Press, Princeton, New Jersey. 248 pp.
- Richard H. Steckel, Jerome C. Rose, Clark Spencer Larsen and Phillip L. Walker (2002) Skeletal Health in the Western Hemisphere from 4000 B.C. to the Present. Evolutionary Anthropology 11:142–155.
- Clark Spencer Larsen (2003) Animal Source Foods and Human Health during Evolution. In (Montague Demment and Lindsay Allen, supplement editors) Animal Source Foods to Improve Micronutrient Nutrition and Human Function in Developing Countries. Journal of Nutrition 133:3893S–3897S.
- Clark Spencer Larsen (2006) The Agricultural Revolution as Environmental Catastrophe: Implications for Health and Lifestyle in the Holocene. In (S.A.G. Leroy, H. Jousse, and M. Cremaschi, guest editors), Impact of Rapid Environmental Changes on Humans and Ecosystems. Quaternary International 150:12–20.
- John L. Brooke and Clark Spencer Larsen (2014) The Nurture of Nature: Genetics, Epigenetics, and Environment in Human Biohistory. In: Roundtable Forum on History and Biology, edited by Randolph Roth. American Historical Review 119:1500–1513.
- Clark Spencer Larsen (2015) Bioarchaeology: Interpreting Behavior from the Human Skeleton, Second Edition. Cambridge University Press, Cambridge, UK. 650 pp.
- Clark Spencer Larsen (2020) Our Origins: Discovering Physical Anthropology, Fifth Edition. W. W. Norton, New York. 509 pp. http://books.wwnorton.com/books/webad.aspx?id=4294992858
- Pedro Da-Gloria and Clark Spencer Larsen (2017) Subsisting at the Pleistocene/Holocene Boundary in the New World: A View from the Paleoamerican Mouths of Central Brazil. PaleoAmerica 3:101–121.
- Richard H. Steckel, Clark Spencer Larsen, Charlotte A. Roberts, and Joerg Baten, editors (2019) The Backbone of History: Health, Diet, Work, and Violence over Two Millennia. Cambridge University Press, Cambridge, UK. 462 pp.
- Clark Spencer Larsen, Christopher J. Knüsel, Scott D. Haddow, Marin A. Pilloud, Marco Milella, Joshua W. Sadvari, Jessica Pearson, Christopher B. Ruff, Evan M. Garofalo, Emmy Bocaege, Barbara J. Betz, Irene Dori, Bonnie Glencross (2019) Bioarchaeology of Neolithic Çatalhöyük Reveals Fundamental Transitions in Health, Mobility, and Lifestyle in Early Farmers. Proceedings of the National Academy of Sciences 116: 12615–12623.
