= Cynthia Beall =

American anthropologist

Cynthea Beall
- Born: 1949 (age 76–77)
- Citizenship: United States
- Education: Pennsylvania State University
- Known for: High-altitude adaptation in humans
- Awards: See text
- Scientific career
- Fields: Anthropology; Human evolution
- Workplaces: Case Western Reserve University
- Thesis: The Effects of High Altitude on Growth, Morbidity and Mortality of Peruvian Infants

Cynthia Beall is an American physical anthropologist at the Case Western Reserve University, Cleveland, Ohio. Four decades of her research on people living in extremely high mountains became the frontier in understanding human evolution and high-altitude adaptation. Her groundbreaking works among the Andean, Tibetan and East African highlanders are the basis of our knowledge on adaptation to hypoxic condition and how it influences the evolutionary selection in modern humans. She is currently the Distinguished University Professor, and member of the U.S. National Academy of Sciences and the American Philosophical Society.

== Education ==
Cynthia M. Beall completed a BA in biology from the University of Pennsylvania in 1970. She entered Pennsylvania State University to obtain MA in anthropology in 1972, and PhD in anthropology in 1976.

== Career ==
She joined the faculty of the Department of Anthropology at the Case Western Reserve University as assistant professor in 1976. She became an associate professor in 1982 and a full Professor in 1987. She was designated the S. Idell Pyle Professor of Anthropology 1994, and the Distinguished University Professor in 2010.

She had served as President-elect, President, and Past-President of the Human Biology Council (now Human Biology Association) from 1991 to 1995. She was the Chair-elect of the Section on Anthropology of the American Association for the Advancement of Science (AAAS) in 1995 and 2010. She was the Chair (2002–2005) of Section 51 Anthropology, Councilor (2002–2005), and Chair (2011) of Nominating Committee of the US National Academy of Sciences. She hold the Chair (2001–2003) of the US National Committee for the International Union of Biological Sciences.

== Research ==
Cynthia Beall is the leading scientist in the study of high-altitude adaptation in humans, particularly in places where there is little air to breathe. Among the Tibetans the first thing that she discovered was that they could live at high levels without having high hemoglobin concentrations or large chests, they had high birth-weighted babies, and no complications of mountain sickness. Unlike most humans who migrate to high altitude, the Tibetans do not exhibit the elevated haemoglobin concentrations to cope up with oxygen deficiency, but they inhale more air with each breath and breathe more rapidly, and retain this unusual breathing and elevated lung-capacity throughout their lifetime. Their high levels (mostly double) of nitric oxide in the blood increase their blood vessels to dilate for enhanced blood circulation. An astonishing discovery of Beall is the convergent evolution in humans from her studies on other highlanders such as the Amhara in the high-plateau regions of northwest Ethiopia, the Omro people in the southwest Ethiopia, and the Aymara of the American Andes. She found that these groups had adapted to low oxygen environment very differently from the Tibetans. Physiological conditions such as resting ventilation, hypoxic ventilatory response, oxygen saturation, and haemoglobin concentration are significantly different between the Tibetans and the Aymaras. The Amharans exhibit elevated haemoglobin levels, like Andeans and lowlander peoples at high altitudes, while the Andeans have increased haemoglobin level like normal people in the highlands. All these observations show that different people adapted to high altitude in different genetic and physiological responses.

== Awards and honors ==
- Elected Fellow, American Academy of Arts and Sciences in 2013
- John Simon Guggenheim Fellowship in 2011
- Franz Boas Distinguished Achievement Award in 2009 from Human Biology Association
- Elected Member, American Philosophical Society in 2001
- Elected Fellow, American Association for the Advancement of Science in 1997
- Elected Member, National Academy of Sciences, USA in 1996

== Selected works ==
- Changing pattern of Tibetan nomadic pastoralism (2002) (with Melvyn C. Goldstein). In: The Human Biology of Pastoral Populations. Cambridge University Press. ISBN 9780521780162
- The Human Biology of High Altitude Peoples (2001) (with Melvyn C. Goldstein). Cambridge University Press. ISBN 0521560144
- The Changing World of Mongolia's Nomads (1994) (with Melvyn C. Goldstein). University of California Press. ISBN 9780520085510
- Nomads of Western Tibet: The Survival of a Way of Life (1990) (with Melvyn C. Goldstein). University of California Press. ISBN 9780520072114
- "Quantitative genetic analysis of arterial oxygen saturation in Tibetan highlanders": In: Human Biology (2005)
- The Biology and Health of Andean Migrants, A Case Study in South Coastal Peru (1982) (with T. Paul). Mountain Research & Development. ASIN B004V2WYA2
- Contemporary Patterns of Migration in the Central Andes (1982). Mountain Research & Development. ASIN B004V2ZJE0
- Journal of Cross – Cultural Gerontology Vols. 1-4 (1988). Kluwer Academic Publishers. ASIN B0017YWJQ6
- "Changing patterns of Tibetan nomadic pastoralism." (with Melvyn C. Goldstein) In: Human Biology of Pastoral Populations, Leonard and Crawford (eds.). Cambridge University Press, pp. 131–150.
