= Human reproductive ecology =

Subfield in evolutionary biology

Human reproductive ecology is a subfield in evolutionary biology that is concerned with human reproductive processes and responses to ecological variables. It is based in the natural and social sciences, and is based on theory and models deriving from human and animal biology, evolutionary theory, and ecology. It is associated with fields such as evolutionary anthropology and seeks to explain human reproductive variation and adaptations. The theoretical orientation of reproductive ecology applies the theory of natural selection to reproductive behaviors, and has also been referred to as the evolutionary ecology of human reproduction.

== Theoretical foundations ==
Multiple theoretical foundations from evolutionary biology and evolutionary anthropology are important to human reproductive ecology. Notably, reproductive ecology relies heavily on life history theory, energetics, fitness theories, kin selection, and theories based on the study of animal evolution.

=== Life history theory ===
Life history theory is a prominent analytical framework used in evolutionary anthropology, biology, and reproductive ecology that seeks to explain growth and development of an organism through various life history stages of the entire lifespan. The life history stages include early growth and development, puberty, sexual development, reproductive career, and post-reproductive stage. Life history theory is based in evolutionary theory and suggests that natural selection operates on the allocation of different types of resources (material and metabolic) to meet the competing demands of growth, maintenance, and reproduction at the various life stages. Life history theory is applied to reproductive ecology in the theoretical understandings of puberty, sexual growth and maturation, fertility, parenting, and senescence because at every life stage organisms are bound to encounter and cope with unconscious and conscious decisions that hold trade-offs. Reproductive ecologists have specifically impacted life history by improving on the energetic models because they are complicated in humans, and involve many causal factors. They draw on classical life history theory, behavioral ecology, and reproductive ecology to make predictions about reproductive behavior and growth

=== Energetics ===
Analytical frameworks that explore problems relevant to reproductive ecology, such as age at menarche, or lactational amenorrhea, often employ understandings of energetics to their hypotheses and models. Energetics in this context refers to energy allocation, under the assumption that natural selection favors optimal allocation and use of energy, but also that trade-offs often pose energetic constraints. Allocations of energy are evolved so they in turn, can be foreseeable but they are also variable depending on ecological constraints.

==== Essential nutrient cost variability ====
The assumption that energy measured in calories can be used as a universal measure of nutritional cost is criticized by a number of scientists on the basis of essential nutrients, nutrients that the body cannot produce regardless of calorie availability and the specific nutrients must be present in the diet. It is argued that since there are different dietary conditions in which different essential nutrients are the most scarce in different regions and the few foods that contain the scarcest nutrients that are needed to avoid deficit diseases are therefore the most expensive (the cost may be paid in the form of other goods and services in societies without money), and different functions in the body primarily consume different essential nutrients, no universal ranking of the costs of different aspects of reproduction can be made. For example, it is possible for the few micronutrients that men consume more of the more sperm they produce but the consumption of which does not increase in women during pregnancy or lactation to be the scarcest nutrients contained in the most expensive food in some societies, making sperm production effectively more expensive than pregnancy and lactation under local food prices in such societies. It is also argued that the variability of what food is the most valuable due to containing the rarest essential nutrients extend their effects to the economical significance ratio between hunting and gathering in the case of hunter-gatherer societies, and therefore that any attempt to circumvent the evolutionary psychology paradox of men not being able to be in two places at the same time to hunt and protect his family by reference to hiring guards by bartering meat would fail to make sex roles universal due to the difference between regions where the rarest essential nutrients were contained in one or more types of meat and regions where the rarest such nutrients were contained in some types of plants. It is cited in this context that humans evolved over relatively large parts of Africa with different food ecologies, making it impossible for humans to have specialized evolutionarily for one specific food cost ratio. This variability of food value ratios within Africa may have prepared humans evolutionarily to be able to leave Africa.

=== Biodemography and human reproduction ===
The researchers involved in human reproductive ecology use the combined approach of demography and evolutionary biology to explain the reproductive phenomenon. Biodemography is the study of demography related to biology and evolutionary biology. Biodemographers do research on demographic outcomes such as conception, spontaneous abortion, births, marriage, divorce, menarche, menopause, aging, and mortality. Biodemographers use mathematical models, statistical estimates and biomarkers to analyze the demographic data. The field of biodemography often explores the scientific questions associated with fertility and mortality across cultures, the determinants of reproductive senescence, mortality and sex differences, low fertility in humans, and longer post-reproductive lifespan in women.

== Key topics ==
=== Gestation ===
In human reproductive ecology, the study of pregnancy is primarily focused variation in pregnancy and on rates of pregnancy loss.

==== Variation in pregnancy ====
Pregnancy varies person-to-person and across cultural and socioeconomic lines. Human gestation is between 30 and 40 weeks long. The dynamic between the mother and the fetus is one of conflict: it is in the best interest of the fetus to gestate as long as possible to continue receiving the nutritional and developmental benefits of being physically attached to the mother. For the mother, however, pregnancy is a highly demanding and risky time. Earlier births avoid complications in the birth of a too-large infant. The length of the pregnancy is a compromise between these two demands, and is influenced by factors such as socioeconomic status, health, and fetal development. Women of lower socioeconomic status have been shown to deliver their babies earlier on average than women of higher socioeconomic status. Research has also shown that stress, especially during early pregnancy, can cause shorter gestation length and increase premature births.

==== Pregnancy loss ====
The rate of embryo loss changes throughout pregnancy. Pre-implantation in the uterine wall, rate of loss is undetectable as the hCG hormone is not secreted until implantation. There is no current way to detect pregnancy or pregnancy loss at this stage. Post-implantation, rate of loss is highest in the first trimester of a pregnancy. The chance of pregnancy loss lowers the further into gestation a woman is.

Pregnancies may be unsuccessful for multiple reasons. The maternal immune system, though suppressed during ovulation, views the fertilized egg as a foreign body and will attack it. Defective embryos may also be spontaneously aborted, or miscarried, whether due to chromosomal abnormality or developmental defects. Endometrial or placental development issues may also cause a pregnancy to fail. Additionally, the frequency of spontaneous abortion increases with the mother's age. Older mothers have a higher rate of genetic abnormalities that can trigger pregnancy loss.

Because human pregnancy is so costly, and human offspring so dependent on their mothers, early spontaneous abortion is high to ensure that energy of a pregnancy is spent on developing a fetus with a high chance of survival.

=== Fecundity and fertility ===
Human reproductive ecology considers fecundity and fertility from a demographic perspective. In this view, fecundity is the reproductive potential of an individual and fertility is the actual reproductive output of an individual.

==== Fecundity ====
Fecundity is determined by the biological limitations of the individual and can be reduced when biological and ecological factors impact an individual's reproductive capabilities. The key components of fecundity are a person's reproductive maturation and the maintenance of their reproductive system. In humans, the timing of female reproductive maturation is particularly variable and is heavily influenced by ecological considerations. In addition, the age at menarche has decreased over time in many global populations. This phenomenon is referred to as the secular trend. Age at menarche is one measure of the fecundity of an individual female. Male reproductive maturity is less subject to environmental and ecological factors, and does not follow the secular trend that female puberty does.

In adults, fecundity is determined by the biological processes of reproduction. Female fecundity is heavily influenced by reproduction and energetics. The ovarian cycle limits the potential of conception to a brief period of fertility roughly once a month. Successful egg maturation, fertilization, and implantation must be able to occur for a reproductively mature female to be fecund. Changes in energy levels, diet, and hormones can all interfere in this process. During breastfeeding, a period of lactational infertility also reduces female fecundity. The metabolic load hypothesis in human reproductive ecology describes how the energetic expenditure of lactation acts to inhibit ovarian cycling. With the majority of available energy going towards milk production, energy is not expended on reproductive effort.

Male fecundity is primarily determined by the quality of sperm and the availability of fertile female mates. Individual variation in sperm load, pH, lifespan, and morphology creates varying fecundity in males. As males do not gestate, their contribution to fecundity is less well established post-reproduction.

A lack of fecundity in adults can be described as infecundity or infertility. Infertility occurs in about 10–15% of couples, with the causes of infertility shared equally between males and females.

==== Fertility ====
Fertility is the measure of an individual's actual reproductive output, rather than just their potential for reproductive success. Fertility rates vary both inter- and intra-culturally. Fertility for both males and females is dependent not just on biology but on cultural, religious, economic, and other sociological factors as well.

Natural fertility is emphasized in the study of human reproductive ecology. Natural fertility is the measure of human fertility in populations without birth control. Research on natural fertility populations seeks to understand the evolutionary context, ecological constraints, and predict outcomes for human fertility.

Fertility is influenced by fecundity, but has additional factors that can increase or decrease an individual's lifetime reproductive success. The inter-birth interval, the amount of time between a woman's births, impacts a woman's total fertility. This amount of time varies cross-culturally, as well as varies with different environmental constraints. Many cultures practice conscious birth spacing to adhere to the desired length of time between pregnancies, or desired number of children. Environmental concerns like fetal loss, lack of resource access, and disease may all impact fertility for females or males.

Fertility rates across the globe have steadily declined. This trend, known as the demographic transition, began in the 1700s and continues today. It is strongly correlated with increased industrialization in a society. This trend is now seen in almost all cultures, resulting in some societies with below replacement fertility. Below replacement fertility is when the rate of childbirth in a society is less than the amount needed for each woman to have at least one daughter. Since the chance of having a daughter is 50/50, there must be at least two children for every adult woman in the population.

===== Natural fertility populations =====
In 1961, French demographer Louis Henry introduced the term "natural fertility". Natural fertility is defined as uncontrolled fertility when the couples do not control the number of children and the family size. Controlled fertility populations use controlled methods to stop having children after reaching a certain number of children. In natural fertility populations, the parity related controls of fertility are not influenced by modern birth controls. Therefore, studying and understanding the age-related changes in fecundity is easier in natural fertility populations in compare to controlled fertility populations. Natural fertility populations deliver an easier platform to study the reproductive behavior which may affect the levels of fertility such as pregnancy loss, time for conception, and length of breastfeeding. In Pennsylvania and Ohio states in the United States, the Amish settlements have been studied to understand the age of marriage, the age of first birth, birth intervals, the age at last birth, and total fertility rate as they are natural fertility population due to their religious belief. The Dogon population in Mali, West Africa are a natural fertility population with high fertility rate and they have been studied to understand the role of the age of wife, the age of husband, nutritional status, breastfeeding status, sex of last child, economic status, and polygyny on the waiting time to conception. Natural fertility population in rural Bangladesh have been studied to predict the role of parity, pregnancy loss, mother's age, economic status, child's sex, and husband's migration on the distribution of postpartum amenorrhea.

===== Quality-quantity trade-offs in fertility =====
The number of children in any family is associated with the quality of those children. There is a trade-off between reproduction and survival of the children which influence total fertility rate in humans globally> In sub-Saharan African countries, child survival is negatively associated with the number of children in the family due to the child competition for parental investment. The decrease in birth interval rate can also endanger the life of the child. In the Hungarian population, a shorter birth interval is associated with less investment of the mothers which results in small body size and low birth weight of the children at birth. In historical Ireland (1700–1919) the number of children in the family was negatively associated with the lifespan and reproductive success of the children. In various natural fertility populations, the shorter birth interval length may cause higher deaths of the infants. The hunter-gatherer !Kung mothers require to carry a greater amount of food and baby on foraging trips and shorter birth interval length results higher infant mortality among them. The 4-year birth interval is the optimum for the !kung women to have a maximized reproductive success. The total fertility of the women is also related to the post-reproductive survival of the women and in pre-industrial (1766–1895) Swedish population, the number of children was found be to be negatively associated with the longevity of the mothers.

=== Physiology and maturation ===
Puberty is the transitory stage in human development in which a person goes from a child into a reproductively mature adult, in other words, puberty is the process of sexual maturation in humans. The onset of puberty varies between boys and girls, with boys usually starting around 11–12 years of age and ending by 16–17, and girls starting around 10–11 and ending at 15–17. Activity in the hypothalamic–pituitary–gonadal axis (HPG axis) initiates puberty by secreting gonadotropin-releasing hormone (GnRH) from the hypothalamus into the anterior pituitary. The anterior pituitary releases the gonadotropins luteunizing hormone (LH) into the ovaries, which produce estrogen, and follicle-stimulating hormone (FSH) into the testes, which produce testosterone. The central event in puberty for females is menarche, the first menstrual bleeding. For males, it is the first ejaculation. The onset of menarche is easier to determine due to the evidence of menstrual bleeding, while the first ejaculation for males is usually self reported. In evolutionary context, it is assumed that human physiology has been modeled through natural selection to maximize reproductive success by allotting energy and resources through trade-offs.

This period of reproductive maturation sees the onset of primary sexual characteristics, the production of gametes and hormones by the gonads, and secondary sexual characteristics. Secondary sexual characteristics include adolescent growth spurt, pubic and axillary hair, genital enlargement, breast development in girls, beard growth in boys, increase in subcutaneous fat, increase in muscle mass, and widening of the pelvis in girls. While there is variation among individuals, secondary sexual characteristics tend to develop in a sequence. For girls, breast development is followed by the appearance of pubic hair, followed by menarche, and fat deposition and broadening of the hips occurring as the completion of breast development approaches. For boys, enlargement of the penis and testicles occurs, followed by pubic and axillary hair growth, voice change, facial hair growth, and muscle mass increase. This period is also a time of cognitive and psychosocial development where social relationships, skills, and experiences outside of the core family are explored.

==== Pubertal variation ====
While puberty is a consistent progression of events culminating in reproductive maturity, there is wide variation in age of onset of puberty and the magnitude of the changes that can be caused by a variety of different influences. Since the mid 19th century the global age of menarche has significantly decreased. Dietary composition, disease, psyschosocial circumstances, developmental conditions, genetics and epigenetics, and other environmental factors can all affect the age of the onset of puberty. These factors can come together and in terms of evolutionary trade offs, alter the allocation of energy into growth, maintenance, or reproduction, as best needed for survival. Most research focuses on female puberty because it is easier to determine due to menarche. While there is variation in the onset time and magnitude, the sequence of events stays more or less consistent, variations in the sequence can indication a pathological condition.

==== Dietary influence ====
Differences in quality and quantity of nutrition account for one of the strongest environmental factors that alter the onset of puberty. Evidence has linked childhood obesity in girls with early pubertal timing, referencing an increased amount of body fat as a signal for the brain to initiate puberty and due to an excess of available energetic resources, since developing a fetus is very energetically demanding.

==== Illness ====
Disease and chronic illness in childhood can lead to a delay in pubertal timing in boys and girls. Inflammatory diseases, parasitic infections, and other illnesses that affect nutritional intake, specially chronic ones, are energetically costly and energy and resources has to be allocated into maintenance and health, sometimes taking energy from growth or reproduction, stunting or delaying them.

==== Genetics and environmental causes ====
Variation in pubertal timing has been directly found to be due through direct genetic association between mothers and daughters in 46% of the population studied. It is believed that an androgen receptor gene, but the specific gene has not been found. Chemicals and hormones found in the environment and plastics such as Bisphenol A (BPA) have been thought to affect sexual development in humans at the prenatal or postnatal stage. According to the Centers for Disease Control and Prevention (CDC), BPA found in plastic bottles and containers leaches into foods and liquids when warmed up, as in the case of plastic baby bottles, and traces of the chemical were found in more than 90% of the U.S. population studied. BPA is of concern because it interferes with the actions of estrogen which is needed as a developmental and reproductive regulator.

==== Stress and psychosocial factors ====
Most of the studies have reported that menarche may occur a few months earlier in girls in high-stress households, whose fathers are absent during their early childhood, who have a stepfather in the home, who are subjected to prolonged sexual abuse in childhood, or who are adopted from a developing country at a young age. Conversely, menarche may be slightly later when a girl grows up in a large family with a biological father present. However, when the stress is severely high and potentially life-threatening such as in times of war, the onset of puberty has been delayed.

=== Mate choice ===
Mate choice in human reproductive ecology is the process by which individuals rationally partner with others. Mate choice practices, like many of the topics in human reproductive ecology, vary greatly between individuals and between cultures.

Culture heavily influences mate choice, but there are evolutionary concepts that underpin research into mate choice. Honest signals are characteristics of an individual that are assumed to be true indicators of health and fecundity. Honest signals guide sexual selection, the process by which certain traits are picked by the potential mate and then proliferate throughout a species. Human cultures vary on what is considered to be a desirable honest signal. Emphasis on wealth, aesthetics, religious affiliation, and lineage, to name a few examples, are all used in different cultures as ways to choose a mate.

Monogamy is the mating strategy of two individuals partnering exclusively with each other for a period or time or for life. Monogamy in humans is generally accompanied by selective mate-choice and mating, cohabitation, and bi-parental care for children. Humans may practice lifelong monogamy, as well as serial monogamy. Serial monogamy is the mating strategy of having sequential, non-overlapping partners.

Polygamy is the practice of having multiple partners at the same time. The composition of the relationship will determine which type of polygamy is being practiced. Polygyny is the practice of a male partnering with multiple females. It is a fairly common mating strategy in humans, as well as in many other animals. Polygyny often occurs in agricultural societies and is often paired with male wealth or land access. When males are able to disproportionately control resources, they may be able to support more than one female partner. Polyandry is the practice of a female partnering with multiple males. It is not as common in humans as polygyny, due in part to the constraints of female reproduction. While a female may only reproduce once at a time, a male may be able to contribute to multiple concurrent pregnancies. Polyandry is often seen in cases when there are more males in a society than females, or when males are considered to be unavailable.

=== Parenting ===
==== Parental investment and parental-offspring conflict ====
In reproductive ecology, concepts related to parenting, social organization, and development are discussed. The concept of parental investment defined by Trivers and Willard in the 1970s is used widely in reproductive ecology to analyze and understand provisioning strategies and how they relate to life history trade-offs. Trivers' parental investment is defined as investment in offspring to that benefits their survival and ability to reproduce, at the expense of the parent's ability to invest in other offspring. Inherent in these strategies is an underlying trade-off between energy and investment allocation to oneself as a parent and to each offspring.

Paternal investment is more variable than maternal investment worldwide, and compared to other primates paternal investment is more robust in humans. Mating and pair-bonding includes trade-offs such as making a choice between investing in current offspring, or investing in future mating opportunities. Over the course of human evolution, there is evidence of reduced sexual dimorphism in humans compared to other primates. This suggests that there was less male-male competition for female mates, which led to more male investment in offspring, rather than mate choices. Paternal investment strategies vary facultatively based on alloparental care, the costs and benefits of offspring investment, societal pressures, divisions of labor, cultural expectations and norms, and the individual qualities of males in any given society. In the field of reproductive ecology, it has been a recent interest to explore the endocrinology of social relationships, including the relation of paternal investment and endocrine function. It has been shown that fatherhood in general, reduces testosterone levels and competition for mates increases testosterone. It is also shown that male endocrine function is mediated by interactions with children.

Maternal investment is widespread and less variable than paternal investment, but there have been recent evidence supporting multiple mating systems for females as well in the evolutionary literature. This could suggest that mating systems may influence how maternal investment is given, and the trade-offs posed both biologically and socially. Maternal investment is almost always necessary for the survival of offspring, because compared to other primates, human infants are highly altricial. Offspring are also categorized as taking longer to wean, still dependent after weaning, and a longer juvenile period.

Parent offspring conflict is a theory synthesized by Trivers in the 1970s alongside parental investment. Parental offspring conflict is also well documented and develops in tandem with the process of reproduction and parenting. Parent-offspring conflict occurs in the relationship between parent and fetus (in the case of striking a balance between allocating placental energy stores to the growing fetus, while maintaining and metabolic balance of the mothers biology), and between parent and offspring. Parent offspring is expected to be highest during the parental investment period. Parent-offspring conflict assumes there will be "disagreements" between parents and offspring about how long parental investment lasts, how resources are allocated, and maintaining the life history trade-offs in the process.

==== Allomaternal care ====
Parental investment provided by individuals other than mothers and fathers is considered allocare. Both paternal care and allocare can reduce the energetic costs of parenting for mothers. Allocare is often referred as allomaternal care or allomothering if it is provided by anyone other than the mother. Based on kin selection theory, it is usually assumed that mothers have been ancestrally necessary to ensure offsprings survival and reproduction. It is less known to what extent paternal investment or care or other types of allocare are a necessity to offspring survival and reproduction. Typically maternal care is defined at the most basic level of pregnancy and birth and lactation, but includes other things like provisioning, learning (in humans), mirroring (mirroring behavior of mother), and holding, carrying, and touching. It has been shown in various studies that allocare can take many forms such as provisioning, providing food, reducing parental costs for parents, time investments, economic investments, and other types of care such as holding. There have been different results from studies in traditional societies and natural fertility populations, than in industrialized societies. Allomaternal care has been hypothesized to have influenced ancestral evolution by being associated with increased brain size. Allomaternal care is also a part of a larger hypothesis of humans as cooperative breeders whereby allocare discounts the individual costs of parenting, especially when sets of parents have children around the same time as each other, or have other kin or community members to provide care (see grandmother hypothesis). Cooperative breeding is a social system that given some advantage over time, and cooperative breeding is much more common in humans and relatively rare in other mammalian species. Traits in our species that favor cooperative breeding evolve over time due to altruism, and within the context of kin selection and reciprocity.

==== Lactation ====
Lactation is one of the costliest forms of parental investment because it is taxing at a metabolic and physiological level, but also in terms of time and emotion as well. There are many trade-offs regarding lactation, and recent work has explored cost benefit models and thresholds for breastfeeding. From a biological and evolutionary perspective, breastfeeding infants is biologically superior and contains various bioconstituents that provide nutrition, hydration, immune factors, hormones, and other necessary components to aid infant survival and growth. Lactational strategies vary cross-culturally, but can typically be defined by sibling sets and sex ratios, frequency of nursing, entire lactational duration, and milk composition. Milk is composed of my bioconstituents, but only a few will be outlined here. In the first days of puerperium, the first milk is thick and yellowish, also called colostrum. For weeks after that, mature milk is expressed and it has been shown that fetal-mammary gland signaling occurs even before birth in determining milk type and concentrations based on the fetus sex. Colostrum plays an important role in establishing the infant gut microbiome, as it contains important immunoglobins, and is high in protein and low in fat and milk sugar such as lactose. While breastmilk is extremely important for infants' health outcomes, it is also known that human mature milk is fairly dilute, which has an effect on infant suckling behavior, which in many cases holds implications for the contraceptive properties of lactation.

==== Lactational amenorrhea ====
Post-partum infecundability, also referred to as lactational infecundability or lactational amenorrhea, refers to the section of the human birth interval from parturition to the first post-partum ovulation. This period varies widely across globe and between societies. The length of post-partum infecundability is heavily influenced by breastfeeding because it holds some contraceptive physiological effects. The role of lactational amenorrhea has been shown to be important for infant survival as a mechanism to delay the next pregnancy, and thus infants have a longer period to optimize nutritional and immunological benefits of breast milk. Post-partum hormonal levels change so that both estrogen and progesterone are "cleared from the maternal circulation" and without breastfeeding, levels of plasma FSH and LH gradually increase and lead to the return of regular menses within 2 months. With breastfeeding, the resumption of normal menses occurs many months later, and the overall effect of lactational amenorrhea is influenced by the intensity of infant suckling.

=== Ovarian aging ===
Ovarian aging is characterized by the gradual decline of the ovarian follicles number and decreasing quality of oocytes. Menopause is considered as the final stage of ovarian aging. Menopause is clinically defined as the absence of menstruation beyond a year. It indicates the cessation of reproductive phase of life in women. The biology of menopause is associated with the depletion of the ovarian follicular pool. At the fourth month of the fetal life, the ovarian follicles reach to the number 6–7 million. At birth, the number of ovarian follicles in the ovary decline to 1–2 million. The follicle number decrease to 300,000–400,000 at the age of menarche. In the entire reproductive age, these follicles undergo atresia and at the time of menopause, the ovaries are left with approximately 1000 follicles. Below this threshold regular ovarian cycles cannot be maintained. The quality of ovarian follicles declines with age due to the increase meiotic non-disjunction. After age 31 years, fecundity decreases and the probability of aneuploidy rate increases in the early embryo.

The regular menstrual cycle is associated with the hormonal regulation from hypothalamic, pituitary, and ovarian axis. Gonadotropin-releasing hormone (GnRH) secretes from the hypothalamus. Hypothalamic GnRH pulse influences the pulsatile secretion of follicle stimulating hormone (FSH) and luteinizing hormone (LH) from the pituitary gland. During the menstrual cycle, due to a decreased level of inhibin-A and steroid hormones, the level of FSH increases. Due to these hormonal changes, the corpus luteum gets destroyed. The elevated level of FSH helps to recruit a cohort of the FSH-sensitive antral follicles in that cycle. During this phase, elevated FSH level stimulates the production of estradiol, inhibin A and B. Following that, due to the negative feedback mechanism the level of estradiol and inhibin-B increases and FSH level declines and it helps to select the dominant follicle. During the menopausal transition, FSH level elevates at the early follicular phase and due to the increased FSH level, the number of FSH-sensitive follicles decreases. These series of events lead to irregular menstrual cycle and the cycle length starts to become shorter. FSH, Inhibin-B, and anti-Müllerian hormone (AMH) are used as the biomarkers for the ovarian aging.

Various genetic and endocrine factors influence the aging of the ovaries and the age at menopause. In some women, the ovaries age faster and the follicle pool diminishes before the age of 40 years. This phenomenon is known as the premature ovarian failure (POF) and it is used as the model for the study of the genetics of ovarian aging. The genes such as GDF9 and BMP15 have been identified as the candidate genes for POF. POF has a relation with the genome-wide linkages on chromosomal regions 9q21.3 and Xp21.3. Several genes related to mitochondrial function such as mt-Atp6, Sod1, Hspa4, and Nfkbia are also associated with the aging of the ovary. In addition to that, the deletion at mtDNA 4977-bp in the granulosa cells is associated with fertility in older aged women.
