= Robert Sussman =

American anthropologist (1941–2016)

- Born: July 4, 1941; Brooklyn
- Died: June 8, 2016 (aged 74); Creve Coeur, Missouri
- Education: Duke University; University of California, Los Angeles
- Scientific career
- Fields: Anthropology
- Workplaces: Washington University in St. Louis
- Doctoral advisor: John Buettner-Janusch

Robert Wald Sussman (July 4, 1941 – June 8, 2016) was an American anthropologist and professor at Washington University in St. Louis. His research concerned the evolution of primate and human behavior, and he was interested in race as a social construct. He was a fellow of the American Association for the Advancement of Science.

== Biography ==
Sussman was born in Brooklyn, New York, in 1941. He earned undergraduate and master's degrees from the University of California, Los Angeles, and he completed a Ph.D. in anthropology at Duke University in 1972 under John Buettner-Janusch. After teaching briefly at Hunter College in New York, he became a member of the faculty in the Arts and Sciences at Washington University in St. Louis.

Sussman's interest was in the evolution of behavior in primates, and he was known for his work with lemurs from Madagascar. He said that studying the behavior of primates would enhance the understanding of human behavior. In the 1990s, he was editor-in-chief of the journal American Anthropologist. He was named a fellow of the American Association for the Advancement of Science in 2000, and he later chaired AAAS Section H (Anthropology).

In 2014, Sussman wrote The Myth of Race: The Troubling Persistence of an Unscientific Idea. In this book, he described race as a social construct rather than an entity based on science. An earlier book, Man The Hunted: Primates, Predators and Human Evolution (co-authored with Donna Hart), made the case that early man evolved as prey rather than as hunters.

Sussman died at his home on June 8, 2016, not long after being released from the hospital after a stroke. He was survived by his wife Linda, who was a medical anthropologist and research associate in WUSTL's anthropology department. In 2018, the AAAS established the Robert W. Sussman Award for Scientific Contributions to Anthropology.
