= The Myth of Race =

2014 book by Robert Wald Sussman

- First edition
- Author: Robert Wald Sussman
- Language: English
- Subject: Race
- Genre: Nonfiction
- Publisher: Harvard University Press
- Publication date: October 6, 2014
- Pages: 374
- ISBN: 9780674660038

The Myth of Race: The Troubling Persistence of an Unscientific Idea is a book by anthropologist Robert Wald Sussman arguing that race is not, and never had been, a valid biological category in humans. It was published in 2014 by Harvard University Press.

== Reviews ==
Robert J. Cottrol reviewed The Myth of Race favorably, writing, "With The Myth of Race, Robert Sussman gives us a comprehensive history of the idea of race and particularly the rise and not total fall of scientific racism". Ruth C. Engs was less favorable in her review of the book, writing that "...rarely does [Sussman] compare the interpretation of one historian with that of another in an objective manner or compare interpretations from one time period to those from another, as other historiographical researchers usually do. Researchers in the past, or present, who do not agree with his conclusions are considered “racists” or part of “the eugenics bigot brigade.”" She concludes that "Sussman’s lack of objectivity in this book is disconcerting. For those looking for a work that summarizes the negative side of the hereditarian and eugenics movements, however, this book would be an adequate reference. Also in its favor is its extensive bibliography of contemporary and older works." In a mixed review, Kathleen Feyh wrote that "Sussman's book is an elegant genealogy of the myth of race from the Spanish Inquisition through the twentieth-century eugenics movement and its demystifiers among those who study human differentiation." She also criticized the book by writing that Sussman's "...analysis is limited in no small part by his method, which confines him to a history of racist ideas and ideologues rather than one of how racist ideas function in society, leaving the reader with a very well-written debate within the field of anthropology rather than achieving one of his stated goals, namely "to further...understanding of why racism is still so prevalent in our society"". In a generally favorable review, Jeffrey C. Long wrote that "The Myth of Race rightly points to a critical role for Franz Boas, who formulated anthropology along non‐racial lines, even before biological anthropology adopted the evolutionary principles established by the New Synthesis in the 1930s. This is an important contribution of the book. It clearly establishes that racists and eugenicists in the last century chose their ideologies over superior alternatives." In comparing The Myth of Race with Michael Yudell's book Race Unmasked, Nathaniel C. Comfort wrote that "The eugenics movement – particularly in the United States in the early twentieth century and in Nazi Germany – offers a cornucopia of evidence of scientific racism. But, in focusing on the US movement's most egregious leaders, such as Charles Davenport, Madison Grant and Henry Fairfield Osborn, both Yudell and Sussman over-simplify. Eugenics was about much more than just race."
