= Comparison of sensory perception in species =

Name of Species	Sight in wave length	Hearing in Hz	Taste	Smell	Touch	Balance and acceleration	Temperature	Kinesthetic sense	Pain
Amoeba	n/a	n/a	n/a	n/a	n/a	n/a	n/a	n/a	n/a
Bat	poor visual acuity, none of them are blind. It has even been discovered that some species are able to detect ultraviolet light.	Bat calls range from about 12,000 Hz - 160,000 Hz.	n/a	They also have a high quality sense of smell.	n/a	n/a	n/a	n/a	n/a
Dog	Dogs are dichromat and less sensitive to differences in grey shades than humans and also can detect brightness at about half the accuracy of humans.	The frequency range of dog hearing is approximately 40 Hz to 60,000 Hz, which means that dogs can detect sounds far beyond the upper limit of the human auditory spectrum.	n/a	may be up to 100 million times greater than a human.	n/a	n/a	n/a	n/a	n/a
Human	red~650 nm to violet ~400 nm (or) VIBGYOR	20 Hz to 20,000 Hz (or) Audio	n/a	n/a	n/a	n/a	n/a	n/a	n/a
Dolphin	n/a	n/a	n/a	n/a	n/a	n/a	n/a	n/a	n/a
Shark	n/a	n/a	n/a	with some species able to detect as little as one part per million of blood in seawater.	n/a	n/a	n/a	n/a	n/a
Blue whale	n/a	n/a	n/a	n/a	n/a	n/a	n/a	n/a	n/a
