= Frank B. Livingstone =

American biological anthropologist

- Born: December 8, 1928; Winchester, Massachusetts, U.S.
- Died: March 21, 2005 (aged 76); Springfield, Ohio, U.S.
- Education: Harvard University (B.A.)
- Occupation: Anthropologist
- Relatives: Guy P. Livingstone (father); Margery Brown Livingstone (mother)

Frank B. Livingstone (December 8, 1928 – March 21, 2005) was an American biological anthropologist.

== Early life and education ==
Livingstone was born in Winchester, Massachusetts, to Guy P. Livingstone and Margery Brown Livingstone. He graduated from Winchester High School in 1946 and earned his bachelor's degree in Mathematics at Harvard University in 1950. He completed a doctoral degree in 1957 and joined the University of Michigan’s anthropology faculty in 1959 where he became Professor Emeritus of Biological Anthropology.

== Career ==
Livingstone's primary area of research was genetic variation in modern human populations. For his groundbreaking work on sickle cell anemia, Livingstone was awarded the Martin Luther King Award from the Southern Christian Leadership Conference. After his retirement in 1998, Livingstone was awarded the Charles R. Darwin Award for Lifetime Achievement from the American Association of Physical Anthropologists (AAPA). In 2002, a symposium was held in his honor at the annual meeting of the AAPA in Buffalo, New York.

== Death ==
Livingstone died on March 21, 2005, in Springfield, Ohio, due to complications from Parkinson's disease.

== Bibliography ==
- Abnormal Hemoglobin in Human Populations (Aldine Press, 1967)
- "The Effects of Warfare on the Biology of the Human Species" in War: The Anthropology of Armed Conflict and Aggression, edited by Morton Fried, Marvin Harris, and Robert Murphy, pp. 3-15. (American Museum of Natural History, 1968)
- Data on the Abnormal Hemoglobin's and Glucose-Six-Phosphate Deficiency in Human Populations (1973)
- Frequencies of Hemoglobin Variants: Thalassemia, The Glucose-6-Phosphate Dehydrogenase Deficiency, G6PD Variants, and Ovalocytosis in Human Populations (Oxford University Press, 1985)
