= Endocrinology of parenting =

Endocrinology of parenting has been the subject of considerable study with focus both on human females and males and on females and males of other mammalian species. Parenting as an adaptive problem in mammals involves specific endocrine signals that were naturally selected to respond to infant cues and environmental inputs. Infants across species produce a number of cues to inform caregivers of their needs. These include visual cues, like facial characteristics, or in some species smiling, auditory cues, such as vocalizations, olfactory cues, and tactile stimulation. A commonly mentioned hormone in parenting is oxytocin, however many other hormones relay key information that results in variations in behavior. These include estrogen, progesterone, prolactin, cortisol, and testosterone. While hormones are not necessary for the expression of maternal behavior, they may influence it.

Based on cross species evidence, some aspects of these mechanisms have been phylogenetically conserved from rodents to humans, meaning that these mechanisms are adaptive for mammalian parenting and that the environment of evolutionary adaptedness of some parenting mechanisms may have evolved when mammals first evolved. The importance of these mechanisms are to regulate parental investment and to inform offspring about their environment, primarily those involving responsiveness and sensitivity. These are commonly mentioned in humans as important parenting characteristics that inform their infants about their environments.

== Estrogen, progesterone, prolactin, and oxytocin ==
=== Nonhuman females ===
Many nonhuman studies can be used as both potential models for humans and to show the phylogenetic conservation of some endocrine signals. Estrogen and progesterone released by ovaries during pregnancy make oxytocin receptors more sensitive in female rats and is associated with the onset of maternal behaviors in other species as well. Maestripieri found a very similar relationship in which estrogen and progesterone are increased during pregnancy whereas oxytocin was increased postpartum. The presence of estrogen, progesterone, and estradiol in pregnant mammals in some species appears to exhibit a correlation to maternal behavior in the mammals before and after the birth of their offspring as well as in interactions with other offspring

However, an increase in hormones influences maternal behavior, but it is not always the cause of the onset of maternal behavior in females. Some studies on primates in which increased estrogen and progesterone have a negative or absent correlation with maternal responsivity are in black tufted-ear marmosets, common marmosets, lowland gorillas, and baboons. Alternatively, one experimental study showed that nulliparous rats, which tend to avoid pups, were transfused with postpartum rat blood that is high in estrogen and progesterone which resulted in responsiveness to the pups' cues. Due to this variation between species, the effects of the hormones listed does not give much weight to the phylogenetic conservation of these neuroendocrine mechanisms; although Saltzman points out that the social structure of some species may be significant. In social species, previous exposure to infants relies less on these hormones to activate mechanisms and more on modulating maternal behavior, because parenting behaviors are not always dependent on hormones.

In non-human primates, specifically lactating females of multiple species, increased estrogen, progesterone, and prolactin are thought to promote parenting behavior. These species include black tufted-ear marmosets, baboons, rhesus macaques, and gorillas. Endogenous signals such as an increase in estrogen compared to a decrease in progesterone, causes an increase in the levels of prolactin, the "lactating hormone," in the bloodstream. Furthermore, exogenous cues from infants such as suckling induces this mechanism. The hormone oxytocin, similarly to prolactin, has been found to increase with an increase in estrogen and the presence of infant cues such as suckling.

Oxytocin has been found in other non-human species to inhibit the rejection of offspring; oxytocin is essential for responsive and sensitive caregiving. Some specific examples include Francis's study on female rats which linked high amount of oxytocin receptors to increased grooming, and another study by Maestripieri which linked oxytocin levels in free-ranging macaques to increased nursing and grooming.

However, experimental results are less conclusive. As aforementioned, nulliparous mice do not respond to pup calls, but when administered with oxytocin, they do. A similar study conducted by Holman and Goy tested nulliparous rhesus females, where their behavior post injection did not elicit a drastic response to infants, however, the adults presented a change in their behavior with a notable increase in proximity and touching. Oxytocin is more often described as a hormone that facilitates bonding and not one that directly increases care. Also, the mice were responding to pup calls and the rhesus macaque infants weren't necessarily providing cues that would induce maternal care and support. Saltzman proposes that this is due to primates living socially and having a slower developmental trajectory, in which learning is more important.

The function of oxytocin may lead to an increase in maternal behavior by subsequently reducing anxiety as it has been found to regulate anxiety, social recognition, and coping with stress. Early studies have found that oxytocin influenced maternal behavior of mother rats depending on the environment in which they were placed. Oxytocin seemed to have an opposing effect on anxiety so that when placed in a novel environment as opposed to a familiar one, mother rats were better able to cope with their higher levels of stress due to their increased oxytocin levels.

=== Human females ===
Like in many nonhuman animals, human mothers go through a period of high progesterone during pregnancy that is followed by a decrease in progesterone and a subsequent increase in estrogen, prolactin and oxytocin near parturition. During pregnancy and postpartum, a high estradiol to progesterone ratio is associated with mothers reporting higher feelings of attachment. High levels of progesterone, which are associated with pregnancy, inhibits prolactin and therefore lactation. Prolactin increases during the initial stages of lactation and can be stimulated by estrogen but not progesterone. Research, however, focuses on the role of prolactin for breastfeeding and less on other behaviors. Prolactin increases with infant suckling, but not other forms of infant contact. Oxytocin on the other hand increases with both suckling, and physical contact in human females.

Oxytocin levels in human females are associated with the degree of physical affection and bonding. Feldman (2010) found that mothers who displayed "high affectionate contact" had increased oxytocin levels post interaction, but not mothers who displayed "low affectionate contact." Oxytocin is believed to provide a feedback loop, meaning that maternal-infant contact increases oxytocin and oxytocin increases maternal behavior and facilitates bonding. In one study oxytocin also played a role on mother reported attachment to her fetus. Studies have shown that plasma oxytocin in pregnant women is higher compared to non-pregnant women.

=== Nonhuman males ===
Wynne-Edwards and Timonin recognize that paternal care is not primed in the same way as maternal care simply because males do not undergo pregnancy. Therefore, males do not go through the same hormonal changes as women. The simplest way, through natural selection, for paternal care to evolve or be maintained is to use the same or similar pathways as females. Wynne and Reburn (2001) suggest that fathers who are pair bonded and spend time with the soon to be mother may activate paternal pathways through various cues.

Estradiol increases just before their offspring's birth in black-tufted-ear marmosets and dwarf hamsters and possibly activates certain pathways involved in paternal behavior. This is similar to estrogen and progesterone in pregnant females. However, the manipulation of estradiol does not increase or decrease paternal behaviors. This may be similar to the finding that women who do not breastfeed or do not have vaginal births still responds to their infants.

Like expecting and new mothers, fathers in multiple mammals have elevated prolactin levels compared to non-fathers. These species include California mice, Mongolian gerbils, dwarf hamsters, meerkats, marmosets, and cotton-top tamarins.

There are variable results in between the effects of oxytocin on paternal care between males of different species. Oxytocin levels are unchanged in California mice before and after becoming fathers, but the amount of paternal exposure to rats is associated with an increase in oxytocin and increased care. However, multiple studies on biparental species show an association between paternal care and oxytocin.

=== Human males ===
In human mothers, oxytocin is associated with high physical contact and affection. However, studies on fathers show that oxytocin is related to high stimulatory contact and exploratory play. This supports three hypotheses:

1. Mothers and fathers play different roles.
2. Mothers and fathers have similar pathways.
3. That there are parallels to animal models, assuming that a high amount of OT receptors in nonhuman animals is associated with a high amount of oxytocin

One study exhibited the proposed effects that oxytocin had on Tsimane men who had been hunting for varying periods of time. Once the men returned home, it was found that oxytocin levels were higher in those men who had hunted for longer periods of time. As a result of the longer time period spent hunting, the increased levels of oxytocin were thought to be interconnected with familial social contact dating back to humans' evolutionary past.

=== Comparison of estrogen, progesterone, prolactin, and oxytocin between species and sex ===
Across multiple species and in some cases across sexes, there is evidence for the phylogenetic conservation of parental hormones. These include the relationships between the hormones estrogen, progesterone, prolactin, and oxytocin. In males across species, including humans, increased prolactin levels are associated with fatherhood.

In both non-human primates and humans, the increase in estrogen and progesterone during pregnancy is often followed by a decrease in progesterone and an increase in prolactin, postpartum. One study utilized Silastic implants containing estradiol and progesterone which were implanted in nulliparous rats that either maintained the function of their pituitary glands or underwent a hypophysectomy to determine the length of time for maternal care to ensue. The rats with hypophysectomies exposed to these conditions for 5-6 days were not affected by the treatment and consequently did not induce any maternal behavior. However, it was found that those rats with functioning pituitary glands exhibited maternal behavior within about 3-4 days.

In some studies on females across species, estrogen and progesterone prepartum is also related to oxytocin. Although, the relationships between these hormones is similar across species, there is variation in the degree to how oxytocin effects behavior. For example, in some species, like rats, an increase in oxytocin greatly increases interactions with infants, but an increase in oxytocin in macaques only mildly increased interactions. However, the importance here is that oxytocin increased interactions in all of the relevant cited studies for females, as well as the majority of studies cited for males.

In fathers across species the effects of oxytocin are more variable, however in general oxytocin is associated with increased paternal care. In human fathers increased oxytocin is linked to increased involvement, however the type of involvement is different between fathers and mothers, where fathers focus more on stimulatory contact and exploratory play. In human mothers oxytocin is associated with general care and affection.

One study examined the effects that intranasal oxytocin spray administration has in relation to individuals' childhood experiences of punishment by maternal love withdrawal. It was found that oxytocin effects were absent in individuals who experienced high maternal love withdrawal indicating that the parental behavior associated with withdrawal causes alterations in the genetic expression of endogenous oxytocin levels which affects their children into adulthood.

== Cortisol and prolactin ==
=== Nonhuman females ===
Studies of pregnant female baboons have found that increased cortisol during pregnancy is associated with increased maternal care after birth.

Heightened levels of cortisol postpartum has been linked to a decrease in maternal care in nonhuman species, including the western lowland gorilla, baboons, Japanese macaques, and rhesus macaques.

The functions of prolactin have been extensively studied on rats which has revealed its effects and profound role in maternal care. The role of prolactin has been found to induce the maternal behavior in nulliparous rats exposed to a hypophysectomized steroid treatment as noted in which prolactin secreting pituitary implants were placed under the kidney capsule which caused a shortened latency to participate in maternal behavior towards foster pups. A different study used non-hypophysectomized, steroid-treated nulliparous rats were exposed to a dopamine D2 agonist, called bromocriptine, used to decrease the release of prolactin. Bromocriptine, in turn, consequently lowered the maternal behavioral tendency to foster the young pups. Conversely, when bromocriptine was used in conjunction with prolactin, the maternal behavior returned.

Another experiment also utilized bromocriptine to inhibit the release of prolactin in mother rats who were lactating to their pups during a 2-5-day period. The inhibition of prolactin release appears to indicate a critical period of the development of prolactin mechanisms within the pups. One study demonstrated that a deficiency in prolactin during the postnatal period in rats has the potential to affect their maternal behavior. In this study bromocriptine-treated juvenile rats exhibited hyperactivity and distractibility from the pups during the maternal behavior test suggesting the importance of prolactin to promote maternal behavior. Adult rats also treated with bromocriptine showed similar differences when exposed to pups as opposed to control rats that exhibited maternal tendencies towards the pups. It was determined that prolactin deficiency may lead to disruptions in maternal behavior in adulthood, affect the neural substrates that promote maternal behavior, and that behavioral deficits are not only caused by a developmental delay in the systems regulating maternal behavior.

=== Human females ===
Cortisol in human mothers is elevated during pregnancy. Human mothers with elevated cortisol during pregnancy more easily recognized, and were more attracted to, their own infant's odors postpartum, but this did not affect maternal attitudes toward their infants. Behaviorally, mothers with higher levels of cortisol postpartum displayed higher levels of affectionate approach. Women with higher cortisol levels were also more alert and sympathetic to infant crying. Fleming and colleagues discovered that there was variation in how cortisol affected mothers with only one offspring and those with more than one offspring. When cortisol levels were high, women with one offspring displayed more affectionate contact, and women with multiple offspring spent more time in caretaking activities.

=== Human males ===
Couvade syndrome, or sympathy pregnancy, is defined by Masoni and colleagues as fathers having two or more pregnancy symptoms. Human fathers with couvade syndrome have higher levels of prolactin, and cortisol levels than fathers without. Cross-culturally couvade syndrome is associated with how close the mother and father are just prior to birth; in the postpartum period, these fathers invested more in direct care. Increased paternal care is likely associated with offspring survival.

A study on Canadian fathers found that, just before the birth of their infant, the fathers had significantly higher prolactin and cortisol levels. The father's prolactin and cortisol levels correlated with the mothers, although her levels were significantly higher. This provides evidence for Wynne and Reburn's hypothesis that mothers may provide cues to the father to activate paternal care pathways. In a separate study, fathers with higher prolactin compared to other fathers responded more positively to infant crying. These levels also positively correlated with father experience. In the same study, cortisol levels in response to infant cries were negatively correlated with father experience. Higher cortisol levels was associated with higher father alertness and responsiveness to infant crying. Increased levels of cortisol in response to infant cries was greater in inexperienced fathers.

=== Comparison of cortisol and prolactin between species and sex ===
The behaviors associated with elevated cortisol levels appears to be more related to whether or not the mother was pre or postpartum, however the behaviors varied across species. In multiple studies on nonhuman females across species, found that high levels of cortisol postpartum was linked to low levels of maternal care. However, when cortisol levels were high during pregnancy there was an increase in maternal care. This difference did not hold true for humans of females and first time fathers. Increased cortisol levels in general increased maternal care. Increased cortisol levels in first time human fathers correlated with an increase in responsiveness to their infant's crying, but not in fathers with more than one offspring.

== Testosterone ==
=== Human females ===
Studies have been conducted that show an interaction between brain circuits that respond to baby-stimuli, such as infant cries, and testosterone and oxytocin pathways. It has been found that when acute amounts of testosterone and oxytocin are administered to nulliparous women exposed to infant cries, they cause decreased responses in the amygdala and increased insula and inferior frontal gyrus responses. The alterations in responses within those brain regions have been seen to induce maternal behaviors. As such, there is speculation that increasing the availability of testosterone and oxytocin alters the maternal brain to induce a non-aversive response to infant cries.

=== Nonhuman males ===
The most commonly associated hormone with males is testosterone. It is believed to be the "anti-parental hormone"; it inhibits the activation of paternal mechanisms. In many cases testosterone levels decrease when fathers have or actively care for their infants in non-humans. However, testosterone can be converted into estradiol, which supports paternal behavior. Testosterone is converted into estradiol through the process of aromatization.

Stated previously, with the repeated presence of pups to non-parental rats, caregiving mechanisms can inhibit other mechanism, like the avoidance mechanism; similar inhibitions occur in male marmosets. When male marmosets hold their infants, they did not have an increased testosterone response to novel females when they otherwise would. In other words, holding the infant inhibited the mating mechanisms.

=== Human males ===
Multiple studies on fathers have shown that a reduction in testosterone results in increased responsiveness to infant cues and that fathers in general have lower testosterone than non-fathers. Testosterone in human males decreases with the number of offspring human males have. However, human males with higher level testosterone had greater activation of neural mechanisms when interacting with their own infants, this may be due to the activation of a paternal protection mechanism.

=== Comparison of testosterone between species and sexes ===
Between species variation in behaviors associated with testosterone in biparental species was not noted. Across species father experience was negatively correlated with testosterone and lower levels of testosterone was associate with an increase in care. Testosterone is more commonly studied in males than females. However, one study on human females found that lower testosterone is associated with increased maternal care.
