= Human biology =

Interdisciplinary area of study of the biology of the human species

Human biology is an interdisciplinary area of academic study that examines humans through the influences and interplay of many diverse fields such as genetics, evolution, physiology, anatomy, epidemiology, anthropology, ecology, nutrition, population genetics, and sociocultural influences. It is closely related to the biomedical sciences, biological anthropology and other biological fields tying in various aspects of human functionality. It wasn't until the 20th century when biogerontologist, Raymond Pearl, founder of the journal Human Biology, phrased the term "human biology" in a way to describe a separate subsection apart from biology.

It is also a portmanteau term that describes all biological aspects of the human body, typically using the human body as a type organism for Mammalia, and in that context it is the basis for many undergraduate University degrees and modules.

Most aspects of human biology are identical or very similar to general mammalian biology. In particular, and as examples, humans:

- maintain their body temperature
- have an internal skeleton
- have a circulatory system
- have a nervous system to provide sensory information and operate and coordinate muscular activity
- have a reproductive system in which they bear live young and produce milk
- have an endocrine system and produce and eliminate hormones and other bio-chemical signalling agents
- have a respiratory system where air is inhaled into lungs and oxygen is used to produce energy
- have an immune system to protect against disease
- Excrete waste as urine and feces

== History ==
Human biology emerged as a distinct scientific discipline in the early 20th century, integrating evolutionary theory, genetics, anthropology, and population studies to understand human variation, adaptation, and evolution. The field examines humans as biological organisms across multiple levels—from molecular genetics to population dynamics—and investigates how biological and cultural factors interact to shape human diversity and health.

The formal study of integrated human biology began in the 1920s when Charles Darwin's theories of evolution were reconceptualized and applied to human populations. This period marked a shift from earlier anatomically-focused studies toward a more comprehensive understanding of human variation, adaptation, and evolutionary processes.

Raymond Pearl (1879-1940), a biologist and professor of biometry and vital statistics at Johns Hopkins University, founded the journal Human Biology in 1929, almost single-handedly promoting and establishing human biology as a distinct scientific discipline. Pearl's scientific versatility during the first four decades of the 20th century contributed significantly to developing biodemography, human population biology, human life-cycle and life span approaches, fertility, growth, and the biology of longevity and senescence. He pioneered the integration of biometric analyses with experimental studies to explore dimensions of human biology.

During this formative period, three individuals dominated physical anthropology in the United States: Franz Boas (1858–1942), Aleš Hrdlička (1869–1943), and Earnest Hooton (1887–1954). Boas contributed to physical anthropology by emphasizing population analyses and rejecting the typological frameworks that characterized earlier racial classifications. His work on cranial plasticity and the influence of environmental factors on human biological variation challenged prevailing notions of fixed racial types.

Hrdlička founded the American Journal of Physical Anthropology in 1918, the first journal of physical anthropology published in the United States. He also established the American Association of Physical Anthropologists in 1930. His work emphasized standardization of research methods and data collection, which enabled more reliable comparative studies.

== Typical human attributes ==
The key aspects of human biology are those ways in which humans are substantially different from other mammals.

Humans have very large brains and heads proportional to the size of their body. This large brain has enabled a range of unique attributes including the development of complex languages and the ability to make and use a complex range of tools.

The upright stance and bipedal locomotion is not unique to humans but humans are the only species to rely almost exclusively on this mode of locomotion. This has resulted in significant changes in the structure of the skeleton including the articulation of the pelvis and the femur and in the articulation of the head.

In comparison with most other mammals, humans are very long lived with an average age at death in the developed world of nearly 80 years old. Humans also have the longest childhood of any mammal with sexual maturity taking 12 to 16 years on average to be completed.

Humans lack fur. Although there is a residual covering of fine hair, which may be more developed in some people, and localised hair covering on the head, axillary and pubic regions, in terms of protection from cold, humans are almost naked. The reason for this development is still much debated.

The human eye can see objects in colour but is not well adapted to low light conditions. The sense of smell and of taste are present but are relatively inferior to a wide range of other mammals. Human hearing is efficient but lacks the acuity of some other mammals. Similarly human sense of touch is well developed especially in the hands where dextrous tasks are performed but the sensitivity is still significantly less than in other animals, particularly those equipped with sensory bristles such as cats.

== Scientific investigation ==
Human biology tries to understand and promotes research on humans as living beings as a scientific discipline. It makes use of various scientific methods, such as experiments and observations, to detail the biochemical and biophysical foundations of human life describe and formulate the underlying processes using models. As a basic science, it provides the knowledge base for medicine. A number of sub-disciplines include anatomy, cytology, histology and morphology.

== Medicine ==
The capabilities of the human brain and the human dexterity in making and using tools, has enabled humans to understand their own biology through scientific experiment, including dissection, autopsy, prophylactic medicine which has, in turn, enable humans to extend their life-span by understanding and mitigating the effects of diseases.

Understanding human biology has enabled and fostered a wider understanding of mammalian biology and by extension, the biology of all living organisms.

== Nutrition ==
Human nutrition is typical of mammalian omnivorous nutrition requiring a balanced input of carbohydrates, fats, proteins, vitamins, and minerals. However, the human diet has a few very specific requirements. These include two specific amino acids, alpha-linolenic acid and linoleic acid without which life is not sustainable in the medium to long term. All other fatty acids can be synthesized from dietary fats. Similarly, human life requires a range of vitamins to be present in food and if these are missing or are supplied at unacceptably low levels, metabolic disorders result which can end in death. The human metabolism is similar to most other mammals except for the need to have an intake of Vitamin C to prevent scurvy and other deficiency diseases. Unusually amongst mammals, a human can synthesize Vitamin D3 using natural UV light from the sun on the skin. This capability may be widespread in the mammalian world but few other mammals share the almost naked skin of humans. The darker the human's skin, the less it can manufacture Vitamin D3.

== Other organisms ==
Human biology also encompasses all those organisms that live on or in the human body. Such organisms range from parasitic insects such as fleas and ticks, parasitic helminths such as liver flukes through to bacterial and viral pathogens. Many of the organisms associated with human biology are the specialised biome in the large intestine and the biotic flora of the skin and pharyngeal and nasal region. Many of these biotic assemblages help protect humans from harm and assist in digestion, and are now known to have complex effects on mood, and well-being.

== Social behaviour ==
Humans in all civilizations are social animals and use their language skills and tool making skills to communicate.

These communication skills enable civilizations to grow and allow for the production of art, literature and music, and for the development of technology. All of these are wholly dependent on the human biological specialisms.

The deployment of these skills has allowed the human race to dominate the terrestrial biome to the detriment of most of the other species.
