= BRINP3 =

Protein-coding gene in humans

Identifiers
- Aliases: BRINP3, DBCCR1L, DBCCR1L1, FAM5C, BMP/retinoic acid inducible neural specific 3
- External IDs: OMIM: 618390; MGI: 2443035; HomoloGene: 17786; GeneCards: BRINP3; OMA:BRINP3 - orthologs

Gene location (Human)
Chr.	Chromosome 1 (human)
Band	1q31.1	Start	190,097,658 bp
Band	1q31.1	End	190,478,404 bp

Gene location (Mouse)
Chr.	Chromosome 1 (mouse)
Band	1 F|1 63.24 cM	Start	146,370,498 bp
Band	1 F|1 63.24 cM	End	146,778,210 bp
RNA expression pattern
Bgee	Human / Mouse (ortholog); Top expressed in: gonad; testicle; endothelial cell; prefrontal cortex; primary visual cortex; right frontal lobe; amygdala; dorsolateral prefrontal cortex; cingulate gyrus; Brodmann area 9 / Top expressed in: lumbar subsegment of spinal cord; ventromedial nucleus; mammillary body; anterior amygdaloid area; piriform cortex; dorsomedial hypothalamic nucleus; supraoptic nucleus; lateral hypothalamus; suprachiasmatic nucleus; paraventricular nucleus of hypothalamus; More reference expression data
BioGPS	n/a
Orthologs
Species	Human	Mouse
Entrez	339479	215378
Ensembl	ENSG00000162670	ENSMUSG00000035131
UniProt	Q76B58	Q499E0
RefSeq (mRNA)	NM_199051; NM_001317188	NM_001145807; NM_153539; NM_001357571; NM_001357572
RefSeq (protein)	NP_001304117; NP_950252	NP_001139279; NP_705767; NP_001344500; NP_001344501
Location (UCSC)	Chr 1: 190.1 – 190.48 Mb	Chr 1: 146.37 – 146.78 Mb
PubMed search
- Wikidata
View/Edit Human	View/Edit Mouse

BMP/retinoic acid inducible neural specific 3 is a protein that in humans is encoded by the BRINP3 gene.

== Function ==
This gene is overexpressed in pituitary tumors but is underexpressed in tongue squamous cell carcinomas, ulcerative colitis, and peri-implantitis. Polymorphisms that increase expression of this gene have been shown to increase vascular inflammation, and an association of this gene with myocardial infarction has been demonstrated. Finally, hypermethylation of this gene may find usefulness as a biomarker for gastric cancer. Two transcript variants encoding different isoforms have been found for this gene. [provided by RefSeq, Nov 2015].
