= Gabriel Lasker =

American biological anthropologist

- Born: Gabriel Ward Lasker; April 29, 1912; New Earswick, Yorkshire, England
- Died: August 27, 2002 (aged 90); Detroit, Michigan, United States
- Education: University of Michigan (B.A., 1934); Harvard University (M.A., 1940; Ph.D., 1945)
- Spouse: Bernice Kaplan (m. 1949–2002)
- Children: Robert Alexander; Edward Meyer; Ann Titania
- Awards: Charles R. Darwin Lifetime Achievement Award from the American Association of Physical Anthropologists (1993)
- Scientific career
- Fields: Biological anthropology
- Institutions: Wayne State University School of Medicine
- Thesis: Physical Characteristics of Chinese: A Study of Physical Differences and Developments Among Chinese at Home and Abroad (1945)
- Doctoral advisor: Earnest Hooton

Gabriel Ward Lasker (April 29, 1912 – August 27, 2002) was a British-born American biological anthropologist. He taught anatomy at Wayne State University School of Medicine for 36 years and served as editor-in-chief of the scientific journal Human Biology for 35 years. He was a Fulbright Scholar in Peru in 1957–58. He served as president of the American Association of Physical Anthropologists from 1963 to 1965 and received their Charles R. Darwin Lifetime Achievement Award in 1993. In 1974, he founded the Human Biology Council (later renamed Human Biology Association) as a society that supported the publication of Human Biology.

Lasker also received the Franz Boas Distinguished Achievement Award from the American Association for the Advancement of Science in 1996. In 2000, he was awarded an honorary doctorate from the University of Turin. He died of kidney disease on in Detroit, Michigan, on August 27, 2002. In 2005, the American Association of Physical Anthropologists established the Gabriel W. Lasker Service Award in his honor.
