= John Buettner-Janusch =

American anthropologist

John Buettner-Janusch (December 7, 1924 – July 2, 1992), often called "B-J", was an American physical anthropologist who pioneered the application of molecular evolution methods, such as protein sequence comparison, to the field of primate evolution. He served as chairman of the New York University anthropology department before 1980, when he was sent to prison for turning his laboratory into a drug manufacturing operation. After his release, he attempted to poison the judge who presided over his first trial and was sent to prison a second time.

Buettner-Janusch was born in Chicago and spent his childhood in Eagle River, Wisconsin. During World War II he was briefly imprisoned as a conscientious objector. He earned a B.S. in 1949 and an M.A. in 1953, both from the University of Chicago, before pursuing doctoral work at the University of Michigan, working with Frederick Thieme, James Spuhler, and William Schull. He completed his Ph.D. in 1957 and the following year joined the Yale University anthropology department. In 1963, he published a study of genetic variation in the Kenyan baboon (Papio anubis) based on protein electrophoresis; along with John Lee Hubby, who worked with Drosophila, Buettner-Janusch was one of the first to apply electrophoresis to population genetics. The most significant of his work, which included over 80 journal articles, focused on biochemical genetics and cytogenetics in non-human primates.

In 1965, Buettner-Janusch moved to Duke University, where he founded the Duke Lemur Center. He wrote two textbooks: Origins of Man (1966), produced with the assistance of his wife and long-time collaborator Vina Mallowitz Buettner-Janusch, and Physical Anthropology: A Perspective. The first textbook, according to the writers of his obituary in the American Journal of Physical Anthropology, "is widely regarded as a classic in physical anthropology, and many [anthropologists] feel that there has been no better text on the subject before or since."

In 1973, Buettner-Janusch became head of the NYU anthropology department. Shortly after his wife died in 1977, he was accused of harboring an illegal drug operation in his laboratory, in which his assistants were making LSD and methaqualone. Although he maintained his innocence, he was indicted in 1979 and convicted, in 1980, on several counts related to the drug operation. He was paroled from a five-year sentence in 1983. In 1987, seeking revenge for his drug conviction, Buettner-Janusch anonymously sent poisoned Valentine's Day chocolates to the federal judge for the case, Charles L. Brieant Jr., as well as others. Brieant's wife fell ill after eating some of the chocolate. After pleading guilty, Buettner-Janusch was given a 20-year prison sentence. He died of AIDS after serving six years; near the end of his life he stopped eating and was being force-fed.

The podcast Criminal produced an episode, "Professor Quaalude," about Buettner-Janusch's life and crimes.
