= American Association of Biological Anthropologists =

International professional society

- Founded: 1928
- Type: Nonprofit NGO
- Purpose: Advancing the science of biological anthropology
- Location(s): 950 Herndon Parkway, Suite 450; Herndon, VA 20170
- Members: 2,200 (March 2019)
- Key people: Anne Stone, President
- Website: bioanth.org//

The American Association of Biological Anthropologists (AABA) is an international group based in the United States which affirms itself as a professional society of biological anthropologists. The organization sponsors two peer-reviewed science journals published by Wiley Publishing: the American Journal of Biological Anthropology and the Yearbook of Biological Anthropology. The Association was formerly called the American Association of Physical Anthropologists (AAPA), but changed its name to reflect the modern biological framework of the discipline after a series of membership votes between 2018 and 2020.

== History ==
The AAPA was first formed following a proposal by Czech-American anthropologist Aleš Hrdlička at the December 1928 New York meeting of Section H (Anthropology) of the American Association for the Advancement of Science (AAAS). Twenty anthropologists and anatomists voted in favor of the creation of an American Association of Physical Anthropologists, and an organizational committee of eight was formed (Fay Cooper Cole, Charles H. Danforth, George A. Dorsey, William K. Gregory, Earnest A. Hooton, Aleš Hrdlička, and Robert J. Terry). The first annual meeting of the AAPA was held in 1930 in Charlottesville, Virginia, in conjunction with the annual meeting of the American Association of Anatomists.

This history of the Association from its inception to 1968 was written by Juan Comas, and in 2005 was translated to English.

=== Name Change ===
In 2018, at the 87th meeting of the AAPA in Austin, Texas, the executive committee stated its intention to hold a survey of AAPA members to assess their opinions on whether the AAPA should change its name, and what potential names could replace it. There were several motivations for the survey, including the fact that most academic departments, courses, and textbooks today use the term biological anthropology rather than physical anthropology, which evokes antiquated foci of the discipline, such as racial typology. Moreover, most members of the AAPA self-identify as biological anthropologists, rather than physical anthropologists. The survey was administered online to AAPA members, and a majority voted in favor of changing the name, with the most popular name choice being American Association of Biological Anthropologists. A formal vote among Regular members took place at the 2019 meeting, with a final vote at the 2020 meeting.

== Membership ==
There are over 2,200 members of the AABA. There are three categories of membership: Regular, Student, and Special (persons with a professional interest in biological anthropology who do not meet the requirements of regular membership). Members of the AABA can attend the annual meeting at a rate determined by their membership category, receive full access to AABA publications and electronic communications, and submit nominations for elected positions. Regular members may vote and serve in elected positions.

== Annual meeting ==
The AABA holds an annual meeting that is attended by scientists from all around the world. The Association's website maintains a record of past annual meetings. To date, the Association has held 94 Annual Meetings. The 95th Annual Meeting will be held in Denver, Colorado, USA, March 18–21, 2026, in the Sheraton Downtown Denver.

The locations of past and future meetings of the Association are listed below:

Annual Meeting	Year	Location
98th	2029	San Francisco, California, USA (April 4–7)
97th	2028	Chicago, Illinois, USA (April 19–22)
96th	2027	Philadelphia, Pennsylvania, USA (March 31 - April 3)
95th	2026	Denver, Colorado, USA (March 18–21)
94th	2025	Baltimore, Maryland, USA
93rd	2024	Los Angeles, California, USA
92nd	2023	Reno, Nevada, USA
91st	2022	Denver, Colorado, USA
90th	2021	Virtual (online)
89th	2020	Scheduled for Los Angeles, cancelled due to the COVID-19 pandemic
88th	2019	Cleveland, Ohio, USA
87th	2018	Austin, Texas, USA
86th	2017	New Orleans, Louisiana, USA
85th	2016	Atlanta, Georgia, USA
84th	2015	St. Louis, Missouri, USA
83rd	2014	Calgary, Alberta, CANADA
82nd	2013	Knoxville, Tennessee, USA
81st	2012	Portland, Oregon, USA
80th	2011	Minneapolis, Minnesota, USA
79th	2010	Albuquerque, New Mexico, USA
78th	2009	Chicago, Illinois, USA
77th	2008	Columbus, Ohio, USA
76th	2007	Philadelphia, Pennsylvania, USA
75th	2006	Anchorage, Alaska, USA
74th	2005	Milwaukee, Wisconsin, USA
73rd	2004	Tampa, Florida, USA
72nd	2003	Tempe, Arizona, USA
71st	2002	Buffalo, New York, USA
70th	2001	Kansas City, Missouri, USA
69th	2000	San Antonio, Texas, USA
59th	1989	Miami, Florida, USA
57th	1988	Kansas City, Missouri, USA
56th	1987	New York, New York, USA
55th	1986	Albuquerque, New Mexico, USA
54th	1985	Knoxville, Tennessee, USA
53rd	1984	Philadelphia, Pennsylvania, USA
52nd	1983	Indianapolis, Indiana, USA
51st	1982	Eugene, Oregon, USA
50th	1981	Detroit, Michigan, USA
49th	1980	Buffalo, New York, USA
48th	1979	San Francisco, California, USA
47th	1978	Toronto, CANADA
46th	1977	Seattle, Washington, USA
45th	1976	St. Louis, Missouri, USA
44th	1975	Denver, Colorado, USA
43rd	1974	Amherst, Massachusetts, USA
42nd	1973	Dallas, Texas, USA
41st	1972	Lawrence, Kansas, USA
40th	1971	Boston, Massachusetts, USA
39th	1970	Washington, D.C., USA
38th	1969	Mexico City, MEXICO
37th	1968	Detroit, Michigan, USA
36th	1967	Chapel Hill, North Carolina, USA
35th	1966	Berkeley, California, USA
34th	1965	University Park, Pennsylvania, USA
33rd	1964	Mexico City, MEXICO
32nd	1963	Boulder, Colorado, USA
31st	1962	Philadelphia, Pennsylvania, USA
30th	1961	Columbus, Ohio, USA
29th	1960	Washington, D.C., USA
28th	1959	Madison, Wisconsin, USA
27th	1958	Cambridge, Massachusetts, USA
26th	1957	Ann Arbor, Michigan, USA
25th	1956	Chicago, Illinois, USA
24th	1955	Philadelphia, Pennsylvania, USA (in conjunction with the American Association of Anatomists)
23rd	1954	Yellow Springs, Ohio, USA
22nd	1953	Philadelphia, Pennsylvania, USA (in conjunction with the American Anthropological Association)
21st	1952	New York, New York, USA
20th	1951	Ann Arbor, Michigan, USA
19th	1950	Boston, Massachusetts, USA
18th	1949	Philadelphia, Pennsylvania, USA
17th	1948	Washington, D.C., USA
16th	1946	Chicago, Illinois, USA (in conjunction with the American Anthropological Association, December)
15th	1946	Cleveland, Ohio, USA
14th	1945	Philadelphia, Pennsylvania, USA
13th	1942	Cambridge, Massachusetts, USA
12th	1941	Chicago, Illinois, USA
11th	1940	New York, New York, USA
10th	1939	Philadelphia, Pennsylvania, USA
9th	1938	Pittsburgh, Pennsylvania, USA (in conjunction with the American Association of Anatomists)
8th	1937	Cambridge, Massachusetts, USA
7th	1936	New Haven, Connecticut, USA
6th	1935	Philadelphia, Pennsylvania, USA
5th	1934	New York, New York, USA (in conjunction with the American Society of Mammalogists)
4th	1932	Atlantic City, New Jersey, USA (in conjunction with meetings of the American Association of Anatomists and Section H of the AAAS)
3rd	1932	Washington DC, USA
2nd	1930	Cleveland, Ohio, USA (in conjunction with the American Association for the Advancement of Science (AAAS)
1st	1930	Charlottesville, Virginia, USA (in conjunction with the American Association of Anatomists)
Founding	1928	20 anthropologists and anatomists in attendance at the December 28–29, 1928 meeting of Section H (Anthropology) of the American Association for the Advancement of Science (AAAS) resolved to create the American Association of Physical Anthropologists, an organization that would be open to scientists of any sex and nationality with interest in "physical anthropology".

== Position Statements ==
The Association's full list Position Statements are posted on the Association's website.

=== Statements on Race & Racism ===
A 2019 statement on race and racism by the AAPA declared, in part:

Race does not provide an accurate representation of human biological variation. It was never accurate in the past, and it remains inaccurate when referencing contemporary human populations. Humans are not divided biologically into distinct continental types or racial genetic clusters. Instead, the Western concept of race must be understood as a classification system that emerged from, and in support of, European colonialism, oppression, and discrimination.

This statement further emphasized that "No group of people is, or ever has been, biologically homogeneous or 'pure.' Furthermore, human populations are not — and never have been — biologically discrete, truly isolated, or fixed."

Previously, the AAPA had published an official position on biological aspects of race, based on evidence from anthropological (as well as biological, genetic, and social scientific) research in the American Journal of Physical Anthropology, vol. 101, pp 569–570, 1996. That statement emphasized that all humans belong to a single species and share common descent, that biological traits are influenced by both genetic and environmental factors, and genetic diversity exists within all human populations. This position was first drafted as a revision of the 1964 UNESCO statement on race, which itself was first created in 1950 in response to World War II and Nazism.

=== Scientific Creationism and the National Center for Science Education (NCSE) ===
As written in 1982, in agreement with the AAAS, the AAPA condemns the teaching of scientific creationism at public expense.

=== AABA Code of Ethics ===
The AABA has an official code of ethics emphasizing the importance of the well-being of the people and animals with which members work; informed consent; conservation of fossil, archaeological, and historical records; making data accessible and disseminating findings; teaching in a non-discriminatory fashion, and giving appropriate credit to all collaborators including students and trainees. The AAPA also issued an official statement on sexual harassment, outlining the definition, prevention, and reporting of sexual harassment and assault within the professional community as well as expectations for behavior among members.

== Leadership ==
The Association is managed by an executive committee chaired by the President of the Association. There are five officers at any one time. The President (who serves for two years), either Past President or a President Elect (who serve for one year), the Vice President and Program Committee Chair (two-year term), the Secretary (two-year term), and the Treasurer (4-year term).

The executive committee consists of eleven voting members: the five officers plus the Chair of Student Programs, Chair of Membership and Credentials, Chair of History & Honors, Chair of Professional Development, the Editor-in-Chief of the American Journal of Biological Anthropology, and the Editor-in-Chief of the Yearbook of Biological Anthropology. Additionally, there are non-voting members that provide advice: the Early Career Liaison, the Student Liaison, Chair of the Ethics Committee, Chair of the Committee on Diversity, and the Chair of the Harassment Committee for Awareness, Response and Equity (HCARE).

Presidents of the Association:

Name	Term
Anne Stone	2025-2027
Leslea J. Hlusko	2023-2025
Steven R. Leigh	2021-2023
Anne Grauer	2019-2021
Leslie Aiello	2017-2019
Susan Antón	2015-2017
Karen Rosenberg	2013-2015
Lorena Madrigal	2011-2013
Dennis O'Rourke	2009-2011
Fred Smith	2007-2009
John Relethford	2005-2007
Phillip L. Walker	2003-2005
Eugenie C. Scott	2001-2003
Clark Spencer Larsen	1999-2001
Matt Cartmill	1997-1999
Jere Haas	1995-1997
Joyce E. Sirianni	1993-1995
Michael A. Little	1991-1993
William Stini	1989-1991
George Armelagos	1987.1989
Jane Buikstra	1985-1987
Frank Johnston	1983-1985
Eugene Giles	1981-1983
William Pollitzer	1979-1981
James Gavan	1977-1979
James N. Spuhler	1975-1977
Edward I. Fry	1973-1975
Alice Brues	1971-1973
Paul T. Baker	1969-1971
Frederick S. Hulse	1967-1969
Stanley W. Garn	1965-1967
Gabriel W. Lasker	1963-1965
Carleton S. Coon	1961-1963
W.W. Greulich	1959-1961
W. Montague Cobb	1957-1959
Mildred Trotter	1955-1957
William L. Straus Jr.	1952-1955
Sherwood L. Washburn	1951-1952
Thomas D. Stewart	1949-1951
Wilton M. Krogman	1945-1946, and 1946-1949 (re-elected)
Franz Weidenreich	1944-1945
Charles B. Davenport	1943-1944 (died in office)
William K, Gregory	1941-1943
Robert J. Terry	1939-1941
T. Wingate Todd	1938-1938 (died in office)
Earnest A. Hooton	1936-1938
Raymond Pearl	1934-1936
Adolph H. Schultz	1932-1934
Aleš Hrdlička	1928-1932
