= Alice Mossie Brues =

Physical anthropologist and botanist

- Born: October 9, 1913; Boston, Massachusetts, U.S
- Died: January 14, 2007 (aged 93); Louisville, Colorado
- Education: Harvard University
- Scientific career
- Fields: Physical Anthropology
- Workplaces: University of Colorado Boulder; University of Oklahoma
- Thesis: Sibling resemblances as evidence for the genetic determination of traits of the eye, skin and hair in man. (1940)
- Doctoral advisor: Earnest A. Hooton

Alice Mossie Brues (October 9, 1913 – January 14, 2007) was a physical anthropologist.

== Biography ==
Alice was the daughter of Charles Thomas Brues, an entomologist at Harvard University and her botanist mother, Beirne Barrett Brues. Alice was a naturalist who specialised in botany. During her youth she was often assigned the task of collecting insects from plants by her parents and her mother in 1924 published a diary work of the families observations. In 1933, Alice graduated from Bryn Mawr College, majoring in philosophy and psychology. Later studying under Earnest Hooton, she obtained a PhD from Harvard in 1940 in physical anthropology.

Her first job was as a research associate at the Peabody Museum at Harvard, and later as a consulting anthropologist with the Chemical Corps. In 1946 she took the position as an assistant professor of Anatomy at the University of Oklahoma School of Medicine, later promoted to full professor in 1960. She also was curator of physical anthropology at Stovall Museum in Norman, Okla., (1956–65) and a staff member with the Southwestern Homicide Investigators Seminar (1954–65). While a curator of physical anthropology at the University of Oklahoma School of Medicine, she contributed to the fields of paleopathology and forensic anthropology. In 1965, Brues was recruited to the anthropology department at the University of Colorado at Boulder, where she remained until her retirement in 1984. She received three awards for outstanding achievement, one from each of the professional associations of which she was a member: the American Association of Physical Anthropology (AAPA), the Human Biology Association and the American Academy of Forensic Sciences. She was associate editor of the American Journal of Physical Anthropology for four years, a member of the AAPA executive board for three years, AAPA vice president from 1966 to 1968 and AAPA president from 1971 to 1973. She was a member of the executive committee of the Human Biology Council and the council's vice president in 1976–77. She also was a member of the advisory council of the National Institute of Dental Research (1972–75) and of the fellowship review committee for the National Institute of Mental Health (1976–77).

She published over 300 scientific articles, and several books, most notably People and Races (1977). Alice dedicated this work to her father, crediting him with teaching her to “think biologically” at a very early age. The work was one of the last to be published on race from a mostly physical anthropological perspective in the vein of Carleton Coon (whom Brues also worked with) and it was republished in 1990. It received some positive reviews, although others were mixed to negative.
