= David Watts =

David Watts may refer to:

== People ==
- David G. Watts (born 1932), Welsh games designer and publisher
- David P. Watts, American professor of anthropology at Yale University
- David Watts (biogeographer), founding editor of the Journal of Biogeography
- David Watts (rower) (born 1992), Australian rower
- David Watts (rugby union) (1886–1916), Wales rugby international player
- David Watts, Baron Watts (born 1951), British Labour Party politician
- David Watts (teacher) (1912/1913–2013), British teacher and amateur sound recordist
- David George Watts (1931–2016), English local historian
- David Fraser Watts (born 1979), known as Fraser Watts, Scottish cricketer

== Other ==
- "David Watts" (song), a 1967 song by Ray Davies and the Kinks, later covered by the Jam
- David Watts, a character in William Boyd's novel Armadillo, whose name is taken from the Kinks' song

== See also ==
- David Watt (disambiguation)
