= Carleton S. Coon =

American anthropologist (1904–1981)

- Born: June 23, 1904; Wakefield, Massachusetts
- Died: June 3, 1981 (aged 76); Gloucester, Massachusetts
- Board member of: President of the American Association of Physical Anthropologists
- Spouses: Mary Goodale (m. 1926; div 1944); Lisa Dougherty Geddes (m. 1945)
- Children: Carleton S. Coon Jr.; Charles A. Coon
- Awards: Legion of Merit (1945); Viking Fund Medal (1951); Athenaeum Literary Award (1962)

Academic background
- Education: Harvard University (AB, 1925); Harvard University (PhD, 1928)
- Thesis: A Study of the Fundamental Racial and Cultural Characteristics of the Berbers of North Africa as Exemplified by the Riffians (1928)
- Doctoral advisor: Earnest Hooton

Academic work
- Discipline: Anthropology
- Sub-discipline: Physical anthropology; Cultural anthropology; Archaeology
- Institutions: Harvard University; University of Pennsylvania
- Notable students: Stanley Garn
- Notable works: The Races of Europe (1939); The Origins of Races (1962)

Carleton Stevens Coon (June 23, 1904 – June 3, 1981) was an American anthropologist and professor at the University of Pennsylvania. He is best known for his scientific racist theories concerning the parallel evolution of human races, which were widely disputed in his lifetime and are considered pseudoscientific by modern science.

Born in Wakefield, Massachusetts, Coon became interested in anthropology after attending Earnest Hooton's lectures at Harvard University. He obtained his PhD in 1928 based on an ethnographic study of the Rif Berbers of Morocco. Returning to Harvard as a lecturer, he conducted further fieldwork in the Balkans, North Africa, and the Middle East. In 1948 he was appointed a professor of anthropology at the University of Pennsylvania and remained there until his retirement in 1963, also serving as the Curator of Ethnology at the Penn Museum. During World War II, he was an agent for the Office of Strategic Services (OSS), where he used his anthropological fieldwork as a cover for an arms-smuggling operation in Vichy France-controlled Morocco. He was awarded the Legion of Merit and after the war he retained ties to the military and the OSS's successor, the Central Intelligence Agency. He wrote about his wartime experiences in his book, A North Africa Story: The Anthropologist as OSS Agent (1980).

Coon's early work in physical anthropology, such as The Races of Europe (1939), was typical of its time. He described the different racial 'types' supposedly present in human populations, but rejected a specific definition of 'race' and made no attempt to explain how these types arose. This changed after 1950, as Coon attempted to defend an essentialist concept of race against the new physical anthropology of contemporaries such as Sherwood Washburn and Ashley Montagu, who argued that the emerging understanding of human genetics negated race as a scientific category. In The Origins of Races (1962), Coon set forth his theory that there were five distinct subspecies of Homo sapiens that evolved in parallel in different parts of the world, and that some had evolved further than others. The book was widely castigated upon its publication and marked a decisive break between Coon and the scientific mainstream. He resigned the American Association of Physical Anthropologists in 1961, after it voted to condemn a white supremacist book written by Coon's cousin Carleton Putnam. Though Coon continued to defend his theories until his death and rejected the accusations that he was a racist, they were quickly excluded from the scientific consensus as "outmoded ..., typological and racist".

Aside from physical anthropology, Coon conducted a series of archaeological excavations of Stone Age cave sites in Iran, Afghanistan and Syria. These included Bisitun Cave, where he discovered traces of the Neanderthals, and Hotu cave, which he claimed showed evidence of early agriculture, though subsequent excavations proved this false. He was also a lifelong proponent of the existence of cryptid 'Wild Men' such as the Sasquatch and Yeti, which he believed were relict populations of human-like apes that, when found, would support his theory of the separate origins of human races. He was involved in planning 'Yeti-hunting' expeditions to Nepal and Tibet, though it has also been speculated that these were cover for espionage.

Coon was married twice, first to Mary Goodale and then to Lisa Dougherty Geddes. He had two sons, including Carleton S. Coon Jr., a diplomat who served as the American Ambassador to Nepal.

== Early life and education ==
Carleton Stevens Coon was born in Wakefield, Massachusetts on June 23, 1904. His parents were John Lewis Coon, a cotton factor, and Bessie Carleton. His family had Cornish American roots and two of his ancestors fought in the American Civil War. As a child, he listened to his grandfather's stories of the war and of traveling in the Middle East, and accompanied his father on business trips to Egypt, inspiring an early interest in Egyptology. He initially attended Wakefield High School, but was expelled after breaking a water pipe and flooding the school's basement, after which he went to Phillips Academy. Coon was a precocious student, learning to read Egyptian hieroglyphs at an early age and excelling at Ancient Greek.

Wakefield was an affluent and almost exclusively white town. Coon's biographer, William W. Howells, noted that his "only apparent awareness of ethnicity" was in childhood fights with his Irish American neighbours. Coon himself claimed that "both anti-Semitism and racism were unknown to me before I left home at the age of fifteen, and zero to fifteen are formative years."

Intending to study Egyptology, Coon enrolled at Harvard University and was able to obtain a place on a graduate course with George Andrew Reisner based on his knowledge of hieroglyphic. He also studied Arabic and English composition under Charles Townsend Copeland. However he changed his focus to anthropology after taking a course with Earnest Hooton, inspired by his lectures on the Berbers of the Moroccan Rif. Coon obtained his bachelor's degree from Harvard in 1925 and immediately embarked on graduate studies in anthropology. He conducted his dissertation fieldwork in the Rif in 1925, which was politically unsettled after a rebellion of the local populace against the Spanish, and was awarded his PhD in 1928.

Coon was motivated to study the Rif by the puzzle of the "light-skinned" Riffians' presence in Africa. Throughout much of his fieldwork, he relied on his local informant Mohammed Limnibhy, and even arranged for Limnibhy to live with him in Cambridge from 1928 to 1929.

== Academic career ==
After obtaining his PhD, Coon returned to Harvard as a lecturer and later a professor. In 1931 he published his dissertation as the "definitive monograph" of the Rif Berber; studied Albanians from 1920 to 1930; traveled to Ethiopia in 1933; and worked in Arabia, North Africa and the Balkans from 1925 to 1939.

Coon left Harvard to take up a position at the University of Pennsylvania in 1948. Throughout the 1950s he produced academic papers, as well as many popular books for the general reader, notably including The Story of Man (1954). During his years at Penn in the 1950s, he sometimes appeared on the television program called What in the World?, a game-show produced by the Penn Museum, and hosted by its director, Froelich Rainey, in which a panel of experts tried to identify an object in the museum's collection.

He was awarded the Legion of Merit for his wartime services and the Viking Medal in Physical Anthropology in 1952. He was also named a Membre D'Honneur of the Association de la Libération française du 8 novembre 1942. From 1948 to the early 1960s, he was the Curator of Ethnology at the University Museum of Philadelphia.

== Military career ==
Coon wrote widely for a general audience like his mentor Earnest Hooton. Coon published The Riffians, Flesh of the Wild Ox, Measuring Ethiopia, and A North Africa Story: The Anthropologist as OSS Agent. A North Africa Story was an account of his work in North Africa during World War II, which involved espionage and the smuggling of arms to French resistance groups in German-occupied Morocco under the guise of anthropological fieldwork. During that time, Coon was affiliated with the United States Office of Strategic Services, the forerunner to the Central Intelligence Agency (CIA).

Coon served as a mentor to Lloyd Cabot Briggs, another Harvard-educated OSS agent and anthropologist, who embraced anthropometry (measuring features of the human body such as crania and nose sizes) as a means of asserting racial types and categories. Briggs wrote books such as Living Races of the Sahara Desert (1958) and No More for Ever: A Saharan Jewish Town (1962). Historian Sarah Abrevaya Stein notes that Briggs and Coon corresponded during the writing of the latter, for example joking about the genital hair removal customs of Jewish women in Ghardaïa.

After the war, Coon returned to Harvard. He wrote an influential paper in 1945 arguing that the U.S. should continue the use of wartime intelligence agencies to maintain an "Invisible Empire" in the postwar period. He served as a scientific consultant to the CIA from 1948 to 1950 and from 1956 to 1957, worked as a photographer for the Air Force.

== Racial theories ==
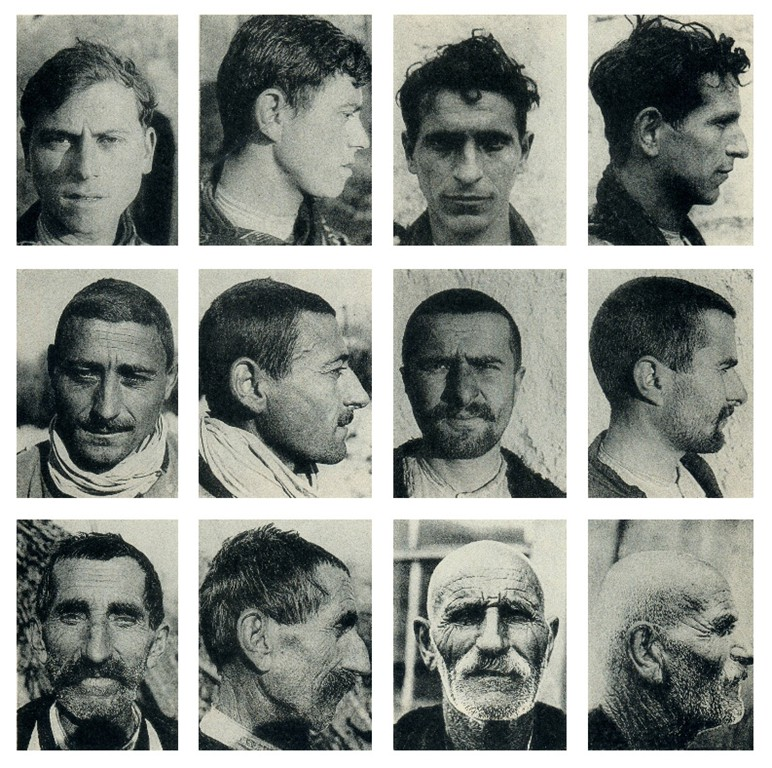
Photographs of men from northern Albania taken by Coon in 1929 and published in The Mountains of Giants (1950). This "descriptive" approach was typical of Coon's work in physical anthropology before World War II.

Before World War II, Coon's work on race "fit comfortably into the old physical anthropology", describing the racial types supposedly present in human populations based on visible physical characteristics. He explicitly rejected any specific definition of race and used the concept to describe both highly specific groupings of people and continent-spanning racial types. In The Races of Europe (1939), for example, an update of William Z. Ripley's 1899 book of the same title, he distinguished between at least four racial types and sub-types of Jewish people, but also maintained that there existed a single, primordial Jewish race, characterised by a Jewish nose and other physical features that together form "a quality of looking Jewish". In these early works Coon alluded to essential, "pure" racial types that produced the specific races he observed through hybridization, but did not attempt to explain how or where these types arose. He also posited that historically "different strains in one population have showed differential survival values and often one has reemerged at the expense of others (in Europeans)". He suggested that the "maximum survival" of the European racial type was increased by the replacement of the indigenous peoples of the New World and stated that the history of the white race to involved "racial survivals" of white subraces.

The immediate post-war period marked a decisive break in Coon's work on race as the conventional, typological approach was challenged by the "new physical anthropology". Led by Coon's former classmate Sherwood Washburn, this was a movement to shift the field away from description and classification and towards an understanding of human variability grounded in the modern synthesis of biological evolution and population genetics. For some anthropologists, including Ashley Montagu and later Washburn himself, the new physical anthropology necessitated the wholesale rejection of race as a scientific category. In contrast, in Races: A Study in the Problem of Race Formation in Man (1950), Coon, together with his former student Stanley Garn and Joseph Birdsell, attempted to reconcile the race concept with the new physical anthropology's emphasis on genetics and adaptation. He presents some of his theories of racial origins in The Story of Man (1954), in which he states that "Racial discrimination is a holdover from a time when it served a purpose, when a racial division of labor carried with it a certain material and social efficiency." He goes on to label race a nuisance due to its being misunderstood.

In 1962, Coon published his The Origin of Races, which advances his incorrect theories of the origins of essential racial types. He modified Franz Weidenreich's polycentric (or multiregional) theory of the origin of races, which states that human races evolved independently in the Old World from Homo erectus to Homo sapiens sapiens (although Weidenreich incorporated gene flow between populations). Coon held that besides H. erectus, five subspecies each lived "in its own territory, [passing] a critical threshold from a more brutal to a more sapient state". His form of polygenism is referred to by some as the Candelabra Hypothesis due to its lack of concern for gene flow. Coon suggested that the racial groups demonstrated the advance of civilization, for instance the Mongoloids and Caucasoids (Note: Coon notes an apparent indistinctness between the two groups, with varying head and nasal forms in Mongoloids, saying some of these resemble Caucasoids e.g. the Ainu, Gilyaks, Atayal, and Miaos.) adapting to overcrowding by means of an evolved endocrine system. He stated that "The earliest Homo sapiens known, as represented by several examples from Europe and Africa, was an ancestral long-headed white man of short stature and moderately great brain size," although he had admitted in The Story of Man that superficial details like skin color were conjectural. Coon also claimed that racial types sometimes annihilated others, while in other cases warfare and/or settlement led to their partial displacement. He asserted that Europe was the refined product of many years of racial progression.

=== Races in the Indian sub-continent ===
Coon's understanding of racial typology and diversity within the Indian sub-continent changed over time. In The Races of Europe, he regarded the so-called "Veddoids" of India ("tribal" Indians, or "Adivasi") as closely related to other peoples in the South-Pacific ("Australoids"), and he also believed that this supposed human lineage (the "Australoids") was an important genetic substratum in Southern India. As for the north of the sub-continent, it was an extension of the Caucasoid range. By the time Coon coauthored The Living Races of Man (1965), he thought that India's Adivasis were an ancient Caucasoid-Australoid mix who tended to be more Caucasoid than Australoid (with great variability), that the Dravidian peoples of Southern India were simply Caucasoid, and that the north of the sub-continent was also Caucasoid. In short, the Indian sub-continent (North and South) is "the easternmost outpost of the Caucasoid racial region". Underlying all of this was Coon's typological view of human history and biological variation, a way of thinking that is not taken seriously today by most anthropologists or biologists.

== Debate on race ==
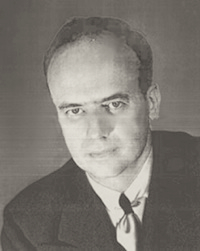
Carleton Putnam (1901–1998). Coon corresponded with Putnam about his book Race and Reason (1961), a defence of racial segregation and white supremacy, and resigned from the American Association of Physical Anthropologists when it passed a motion condemning it.

The Civil Rights Movement of the 1960s and changing social attitudes challenged racial theories like Coon's that had been used by segregationists to justify discrimination and depriving people of civil rights. In 1961, Coon's distant cousin Carleton Putnam, wrote Race and Reason: A Yankee View, arguing a scientific basis for white supremacy and the continuation of racial segregation in the U.S. After the book was made required reading for high-school students in Louisiana, the American Association of Physical Anthropologists (AAPA) passed a resolution condemning it. Coon, who had corresponded with Putnam about the book as he was writing it and chaired the meeting of the AAPA in which the resolution was passed, resigned in protest, criticizing the resolution as scientifically irresponsible and a violation of free speech. Later, he claimed to have asked how many of those present at the meeting had read the book and that only one hand was raised.

Coon published The Origin of Races in 1962. In its "Introduction", he described the book as part of the outcome of his project he conceived (in light of his work on The Races of Europe) around the end of 1956, for a work to be titled along the lines of Races of the World. He said that since 1959 he had proceeded with the intention to follow The Origin of Races with a sequel, so the two would jointly fulfill the goals of the original project. (He published The Living Races of Man in 1965.) The book asserted that the human species divided into five races before it had evolved into H. sapiens. Further, he suggested that the races evolved into H. sapiens at different times. It was not well received. The field of anthropology was moving rapidly from theories of race typology, and The Origin of Races was widely castigated by his peers in anthropology as supporting racist ideas with outmoded theory and notions which had long since been repudiated by modern science. One of his harshest critics, Theodosius Dobzhansky, scorned it as providing "grist for racist mills".

Geneticist Dobzhansky's shot
His bolt and really gone to pot.
Things which now pass above his pate
Cause him to fume and fulminate
In ways unacademical
And anything but oecumenical.
Querulous cracks with venom spattered
Tell of an ethos sadly shattered.

— Poem written by Coon around 1963

The dispute that followed the publication of The Origin of Races was personal as well as academic. Coon had known Ashley Montagu and Dobzhansky for decades and the three men often corresponded and wrote positive reviews of each other's work before 1962. Their vociferous criticism of Origins severed their friendship and affected Coon on a personal and emotional level. In a letter to Dobzhansky shortly after its publication, Coon advised him that he considered his critiques defamatory and had consulted a lawyer, writing: "Why have you done this? When are you going to stop?" Washburn was a fellow student of Earnest Hooton at Harvard, and Coon saw his subsequent repudiation of biological race as an "oedipal" betrayal of their mentor. Garn, Coon's former student and coauthor of Races, helped draft the AAPA motion condemning Putnam, which also disappointed Coon. Coon stopped referencing Montagu and then Washburn in his work after they each publicly rejected the concept of race. Nevertheless, historian Peter Sachs Collopy has noted that Coon was able to maintain cordial relationships with many of those he had disagreements with, rooted in his belief in the importance of academic collegiality.

Although some of these interpersonal conflicts faded over time—Coon wrote that he had "buried the now-rusty hatchet" with Dobzhansky in a letter to him in 1975—the animosity between Coon and Montagu was severe and lasting. Before 1962, the two were on friendly terms, but represented rival schools of anthropology (Coon studied under Hooton at Harvard; Montagu under Boas at Columbia), and Coon privately disdained his work. After the publication of Origins, they engaged in a lengthy correspondence, published in Current Anthropology, that "consisted almost entirely of bickering over minutiae, name calling, and sarcasm". Privately, Coon suspected Montagu (a target of McCarthyism) of communist sympathies and of turning Dobzhansky and others against him. As late as 1977, he was quoted as saying to a colleague, "You had Ashley Montagu in your office? And you didn't shoot him?" The enmity was reciprocated; in a 1974 letter to Stephen Jay Gould, Montagu wrote, "Coon ... is a racist and an antisemite, as I know well, so when you describe Coon's letter to the editor of Natural History as 'amusing' I understand exactly what you mean—but it is so in exactly the same sense as Mein Kampf was 'amusing'."

Coon continued to write and defend his work until his death, publishing two volumes of memoirs in 1980 and 1981.

== Other work ==
=== Archaeology ===
After taking up his position at Pennsylvania in 1948, Coon embarked on a series of archaeological expeditions to Iran, Afghanistan and Syria. His 1949 excavations at four cave sites in Iran (Bisitun, Tamtama, Khunik and Belt) were the first systematic investigations of Palaeolithic archaeology in Iran. The most significant of these was Bisitun, which Coon called "Hunter's Cave", where he discovered evidence of the Mousterian industry and several human fossils that were later confirmed to belong to Neanderthals. Coon published the results of these excavations in a 1951 monograph, Cave Explorations in Iran, 1949, and subsequently wrote a popular book about the expeditions, The Seven Caves: Archaeological Explorations in the Middle East (1957). Bisitun remained the only fully-published Palaeolithic site from Iran for several decades.

Coon followed up his 1949 expedition with excavations at Hotu Cave in 1951. He interpreted the site, together with Belt Cave, as the first traces of a "Mesolithic" in Iran and claimed that they showed evidence of early agriculture. Other archaeologists questioned the basis for these claims and subsequent excavations at sites such as Ganj Dareh clarified that Coon had probably conflated separate Epipalaeolithic hunter-gatherer and Neolithic farmer occupations at the sites.

=== Cryptozoology ===
Coon was, up to his death, a proponent of the existence of bipedal cryptids, including Sasquatch and Yeti. His 1954 book The Story of Man included a chapter on "Giant Apes and Snowmen" and a figure showing the purported footprints of an "Abominable Snowman" alongside those of extinct hominids, and near the end of his life he wrote a paper on "Why There Has to Be a Sasquatch". In the late 1950s, he was approached by Life magazine about either joining Tom Slick and Peter Byrne's expedition to the Himalayas to search for evidence of Yeti, or organising his own expedition. Although Coon spent some time planning the logistics, in the end neither materialised. Coon believed that cryptid "Wild Men" were relict populations of Pleistocene apes and that, if their existence could be proved scientifically, they would lend support to his theory of the separate origins of human races.

Cultural historian Colin Dickey has argued that the search for Sasquatch and Yeti are inextricably linked to racism: "For an anthropologist like Coon, invested in finding some sort of scientific basis to justify his racism, Wild Men lore offered a compelling narrative, a chance to prove a scientific basis for his white supremacy." It has also been speculated that the Yeti expeditions that Coon was involved with were cover for American espionage in Nepal and Tibet, since both he and Slick had links to US intelligence agencies, and Byrne was allegedly involved in the extraction of the 14th Dalai Lama from Tibet by the CIA in 1959.

Coon's views on cryptids were a major influence on Grover Krantz, and the two were close friends in his later life.

== Reception and legacy ==
Coon's published magnum opus, The Origin of Races (1962), received mixed reactions from scientists of the era. Ernst Mayr praised the work for its synthesis as having an "invigorating freshness that will reinforce the current revitalization of physical anthropology". A book review by Stanley Marion Garn criticised Coon's parallel view of the origin of the races with little gene flow but praised the work for its racial taxonomy and concluded: "an overall favorable report on the now famous Origin of Races". Sherwood Washburn and Ashley Montagu were heavily influenced by the modern synthesis in biology and population genetics. In addition, they were influenced by Franz Boas, who had moved away from typological racial thinking. Rather than supporting Coon's theories, they and other contemporary researchers viewed the human species as a continuous serial progression of populations and heavily criticized Coon's Origin of Races.

In a New York Times' obituary he was hailed for "important contributions to most of the major subdivisions of modern anthropology", "pioneering contributions to the study of human transition from the hunter-gatherer culture to the first agricultural communities." and "important early work in studying the physical adaptations of humans in such extreme environments as deserts, the Arctic and high altitudes." William W. Howells, writing in a 1989 article, noted that Coon's research was "still regarded as a valuable source of data". In 2001, John P. Jackson, Jr. researched Coon's papers to review the controversy around the reception of The Origin of Races, stating in the article abstract:

Segregationists in the United States used Coon's work as proof that African Americans were "junior" to white Americans, and thus unfit for full participation in American society. The paper examines the interactions among Coon, segregationist Carleton Putnam, geneticist Theodosius Dobzhansky, and anthropologist Sherwood Washburn. The paper concludes that Coon actively aided the segregationist cause in violation of his own standards for scientific objectivity.

Jackson found in the archived Coon papers records of repeated efforts by Coon to aid Putnam's efforts to provide intellectual support to the ongoing resistance to racial integration, but cautioned Putnam against statements that could identify Coon as an active ally (Jackson also noted that both men had become aware that they had General Israel Putnam as a common ancestor, making them (at least distant) cousins, but Jackson indicated neither when either learned of the family relationship nor whether they had a more recent common ancestor). Alan H. Goodman (2000) has said that Coon's main legacy was not his "separate evolution of races (Coon 1962)," but his "molding of race into the new physical anthropology of adaptive and evolutionary processes (Coon et al. 1950)," since he attempted to "unify a typological model of human variation with an evolutionary perspective and explained racial differences with adaptivist arguments."

== Personal life ==
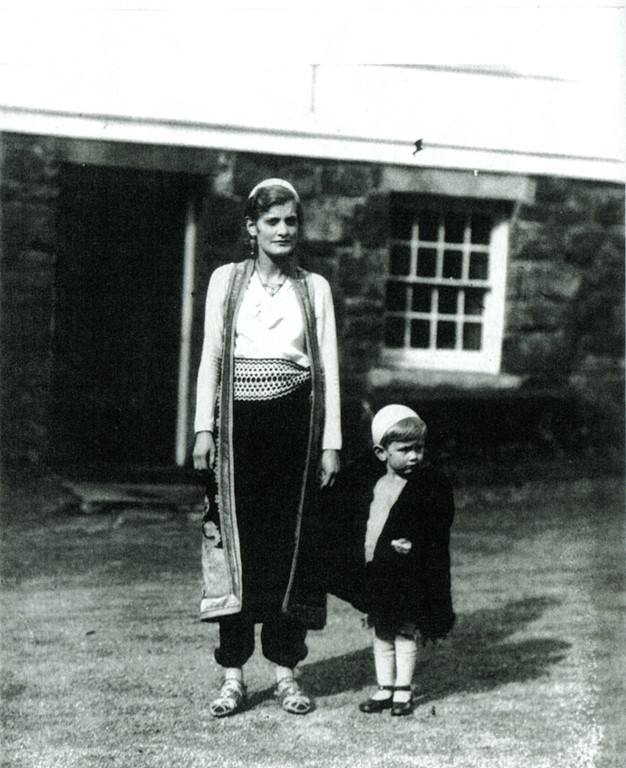
Mary Coon (née Goodale, left) was married to Coon between 1926 and 1944.

Coon married Mary Goodale in 1926. They had two sons, one of whom, Carleton S. Coon Jr. went on to become Ambassador to Nepal. Coon and Goodale divorced and in 1945 he married Lisa Dougherty Geddes. He was a member of the Congregational Church.

Coon retired from Pennsylvania in 1963, but retained an affiliation with the Peabody Museum and continued to write until the end of his life. He appeared on several episodes of television quiz show What in the World? between 1952 and 1957.

Coon died in Gloucester, Massachusetts on June 3, 1981.

== Selected publications ==
Fiction:

- Flesh of the Wild Ox (1932)
- The Riffian (1933)

Non-fiction:

- Tribes of the Rif (Harvard African Studies, 1931)
- Measuring Ethiopia and Flight into Arabia (1935)
- The Races of Europe (1939)
- The Story of Man (1954)
- Caravan: the Story of the Middle East (1958)
- The Origin of Races (1962)
- Races: A Study of the Problems of Race Formation in Man
- The Hunting Peoples
- Anthropology A to Z (1963)
- Living Races of Man (1965)
- A North Africa Story: Story of an Anthropologist as OSS Agent (1980)
- Adventures and Discoveries: The Autobiography of Carleton S. Coon (1981)
- Racial Adaptations (1982)
- Seven Caves: Archaeological Exploration in the Middle East
- Mountains of Giants: A Racial and Cultural Study of the North Albanian Mountain Ghegs
- Yengema Cave Report (his work in Sierra Leone)

== See also ==
- Social anthropology

== Notes ==
Footnotes

Citations
