= Shirley C. Strum =

Anthropologist and primatologist studying baboons

Shirley Carol Strum (born September 11, 1947) is a primatologist, conservationist and author. In 1972, as a graduate student, she began a study of olive baboons (papio anubis) in Kenya that is ongoing and among the longest wildlife field studies on record. Her findings changed scientific and popular perceptions of baboons by testing assumptions about the male and female dominance hierarchies, male aggression, social conduct and troop structure, and the baboon mind. Strum became convinced that baboons think tactically and possess the ability to make good and even bad decisions—ideas once viewed as unorthodox, now considered mainstream. She is emerita professor of anthropology at UC San Diego and teaches each spring, but lives mainly in Kenya where she remains active in the Uaso Nigiro Baboon Project.

== Biography ==
Strum was born in Stuttgart, Germany, to parents who survived Nazi concentration camps. She is an only child. When she was 5, the family relocated to San Diego as naturalized U.S. citizens. In 1965, Strum enrolled at U.C. Berkeley, where a lecture course taught by anthropologist Sherwood Washburn, "the father of modern primatology," inspired her to pursue a career in primate science. Washburn became a mentor, while Phyllis Dolhinow served as her thesis advisor. She received her doctorate in physical anthropology in 1976; Science magazine featured her thesis work on baboon hunting. She accepted a teaching offer from U.C. San Diego that accommodated her ongoing field study in Kenya.

In 1983, Strum married David "Jonah" Western, known for his conservation work in the larger Amboseli ecosystem. They have two children. In 2001, Strum underwent an aggressive surgical procedure to fix a debilitating back problem which threatened to end her career in the field.

== Research ==
Strum watched gibbons and patas monkeys at the Berkeley field station prior to starting her field study of the "Pumphouse Gang" of olive baboons at Kekopey, Kenya, in September 1972. Her objective was to test whether baboons in the wild conformed to the male-centric "baboon model" and might serve as proxies for the earliest stages of human evolution. They did not conform. The male hierarchy proved dynamic, not orderly, as expected. She also observed social strategies, used by both males and females, to offset aggression. E.g., a male might recruit an infant baboon to act as a living shield to ward off a rival's aggression, a behavior called agonistic buffering.

In the early 1970s, Strum discovered what she terms "complexity" in baboon society, a concept that includes social strategies of competition and defense, negotiated and reciprocal relationships, and evidence of baboon "mind." In 1976, what was then the Gilgil Baboon Project became "long term."

In the early 1980s, Kenyan farmers began settling in the study baboons' home range. Baboons targeted field crops and human-wildlife conflict resulted. Strum recognized the situation as an early symptom of the then-nascent biodiversity crisis and broadened her research scope to include ecology. She phased out graduate student assistants in favor of local Kenyans, who proved helpful with community relations as well as data collection. Despite Strum's efforts to stop crop raiding and improve farmers' prospects (1981–84), conflict persisted and was often lethal to the baboons. This led to her scientific translocation of three baboon troops in 1984, the first of its kind. Trapped and sedated, 132 animals were transported by truck roughly 100 miles to the Laikipia Plateau. There, Strum studied how baboons adapt to a place with unfamiliar food resources, a harsher climate and animals they'd never encountered, including elephants. Strum's first book, Almost Human: a Journey into the World of Baboons (Random House, 1987; U. of Chicago Press, 2001) recounts her early research and the translocation.

Strum's approach combined quantitative data with descriptive "natural history," borrowed, she later realized, from Darwin. Her unorthodox methodology allowed her to put behavior and events in ecological and historic context. Such an event was the spread of an imported prickly pear cactus (Opuntia stricta). Across two decades, she tracked the cactus "invasion" and its impact on the baboons—who competed for its fruit—giving equal weight to "process" and "outcome." After decades of close observation, Strum felt she understood, in her words, "what baboons really are." She revisited human origins and began to question assumptions about evolutionary theory, notably "survival of the fittest." Strum's latest book, Echoes of Our Origins: Baboons, Humans, and Nature (Johns Hopkins U. Press, 2025), retrospectively recaps her decades of field work; describes recent findings, and reflects on science, nature, mind, evolution, and the implications of traits shared by humans and baboons.

== Media ==
Strum has written for popular magazines such as National Geographic, aiming to improve the baboon's reputation. Strum has also appeared in 25 natural history documentaries, starting with Survival Anglia's "Shirley Strum and the Pumphouse Gang," and including, most recently, The Secret Life of Animals," a BBC production carried by Apple+. Others are "Trials of Life" (BBC), "Monkey Business" (Canadian Broadcast Company), "Among the Baboons" (National Geographic Explorer), and the award-winning "Baboon Tales," a joint venture of Tamarin Productions, Discovery USA and Discovery Canada.

== Conservation and community involvement ==
Strum's husband, David Western, pioneered community-based conservation (CBC) in the 1960s. Her conservation work is based on Western's approach: "If people are part of the problem, then people have to be part of the solution." Strum's efforts have included the building of local schools, recruitment and training of Kenyan research assistants, and developing ecotourism with the Maasai women of the Twala Cultural Manyatta. The latter effort earned her the honorific "Mama Twala," the mother of Twala. Her 1984 translocation of 132 baboons established primate translocation as a conservation and wildlife management tool.

== Collaborations ==
In the 1980, Strum and the French philosopher Bruno Latour began a collaboration that lasted until his death in 2022. Latour's Actor Network Theory emerged from watching and discussing behavioral differences between baboons and humans. Latour inspired Strum to take a 10-year detour into Science Studies, focusing on the scientific process. A 1976 Wenner-Gren International symposium organized by Strum failed to produce a publication because participants balked at being studied, as proposed, by Latour. However, 20 years later, another Wenner-Gren symposium at Teresopolis, Brazi, co-hosted by Linda Fedigan, engendered cooperation between those who study primates and those who study scientists. The results were published in Primate Encounters: Models of Science, Gender and Society.

== Bibliography ==
Almost Human: A Journey Into the World of Baboons. W. W. Norton & Company (1990).
