= Mongoloid =

Outdated grouping of human beings

Mongoloid (/ˈmɒŋɡəˌlɔɪd/) is an obsolete racial grouping of various peoples indigenous to large parts of Asia, the Americas, and some regions in Europe and Oceania. The term is derived from a now-disproven theory of biological race. In the past, other terms such as "Mongolian race", "yellow", "Asiatic" and "Oriental" have been used as synonyms.

The concept of dividing humans into the Mongoloid, Caucasoid, and Negroid races was introduced in the 1780s by members of the Göttingen school of history. It was further developed by Western scholars in the context of racist ideologies during the age of colonialism. With the rise of modern genetics, the concept of distinct human races in a biological sense has become obsolete. In 2019, the American Association of Biological Anthropologists stated: "The belief in 'races' as natural aspects of human biology, and the structures of inequality (racism) that emerge from such beliefs, are among the most damaging elements in the human experience both today and in the past."

The term Mongoloid has had a second usage referencing people with Down syndrome, now generally regarded as highly offensive. Those affected were often referred to as "Mongoloids" or in terms of "Mongolian idiocy" or "Mongolian imbecility".

== History of the concept ==
=== Origins ===
Mongolian as a term for race was first introduced in 1785 by Christoph Meiners, a scholar at the then modern Göttingen University. Meiners divided humanity into two races he labeled "Tartar-Caucasians" and "Mongolians", believing the former to be beautiful, the latter to be "weak in body and spirit, bad, and lacking in virtue".

His more influential Göttingen colleague Johann Friedrich Blumenbach borrowed the term Mongolian for his division of humanity into five races in the revised 1795 edition of his De generis humani varietate nativa (On the Natural Variety of Mankind). Although Blumenbach's concept of five races later gave rise to scientific racism, his arguments were basically anti-racist, since he underlined that humankind as a whole forms one single species, and points out that the transition from one race to another is so gradual that the distinctions between the races presented by him are "very arbitrary". In Blumenbach's concept, the Mongolian race comprises the peoples living in Asia east of the Ob River, the Caspian Sea and the Ganges River, with the exception of the Malays, who are considered to be transitional between Caucasian and Ethiopian. Of peoples living outside Asia, he includes the "Eskimos" in northern America and the European Finns, among whom he includes the "Lapps".

=== In the context of scientific racism ===
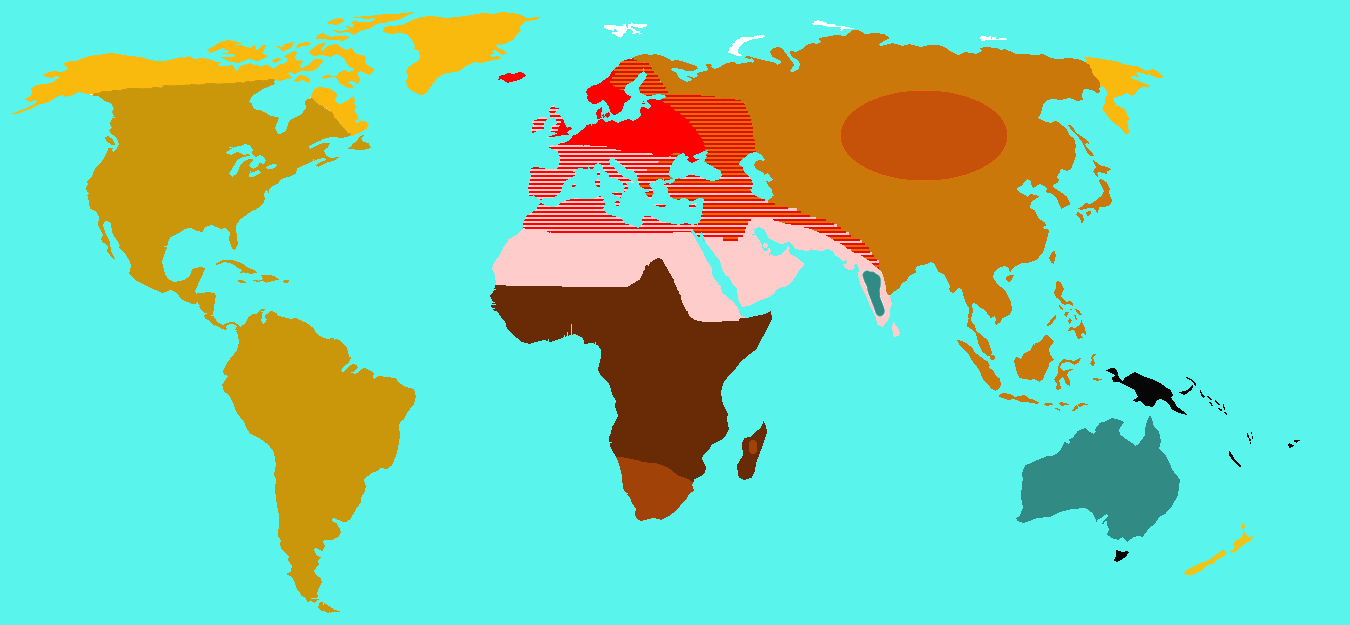
Huxley's map of racial categories from On the Geographical Distribution of the Chief Modifications of Mankind (1870) 1: Bushmen 2: Negroes 3: Negritoes 4: Melanochroi 5: Australoids 6: Xanthochroi 7: Polynesians 8: Mongoloids A 8: Mongoloids B 8: Mongoloids C 9: Esquimaux

Discussions on race among Western scholars during the 19th century took place against the background of the debate between monogenists and polygenists, the former arguing for a single origin of all humankind, the latter holding that each human race had a specific origin. Monogenists based their arguments either on a literal interpretation of the biblical story of Adam and Eve or on secular research. Since polygenism stressed the perceived differences, it was popular among white supremacists, especially slaveholders in the US.

British biologist Thomas Huxley, a strong advocate of Darwinism and a monogenist, presented the views of polygenists in 1865: "[S]ome imagine their assumed species of mankind were created where we find them... the Mongolians from the Orangs".

During the 19th century, diverging opinions were pronounced whether Native Americans or Malays should be included in the grouping which was sometimes called "Mongolian" and sometimes "Mongoloid". For example, D. M. Warren in 1856 used a narrow definition which did not include either the "Malay" or the "American" races, while Huxley (1870) and Alexander Winchell (1881) included both Malays and indigenous Americans. In 1861, Isidore Geoffroy Saint-Hilaire added the Australian as a secondary race (subrace) of the principal race of Mongolian.

In his Essai sur l'inégalité des races humaines (Essay on the Inequality of the Human Races, published 1853–55), which would later influence Adolf Hitler, the French aristocrat Arthur de Gobineau defined three races which he called "white", "black", and "yellow". His "yellow race", corresponding to other writers' "Mongoloid race", consisted of "the Altaic, Mongol, Finnish and Tartar branches". While he saw the "white race" as superior, he claimed that the "yellow race" was physically and intellectually mediocre but had an extremely strong materialism that allowed them to achieve certain results.

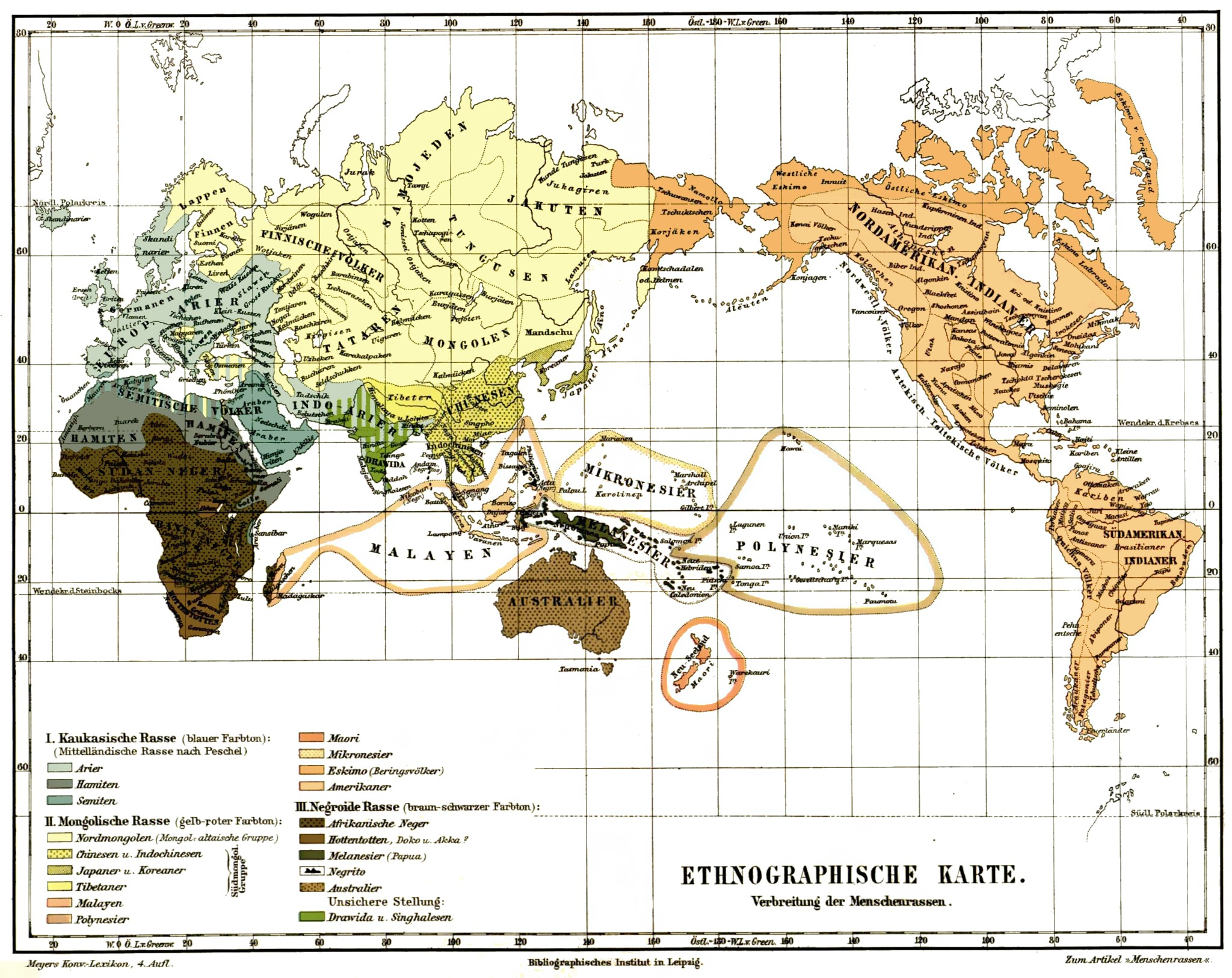
Meyers Konversations-Lexikon (1885–1890) ethnographic map: Caucasoid: Aryan Semitic Hamitic Negroid: African Negro Khoikhoi Melanesian Negrito Australoid Uncertain: Dravida & Sinhalese / Mongoloid: North Mongol Chinese & Indochinese Korean & Japanese Tibetan & Burmese Malay Polynesian Maori Micronesian Eskimo / Inuit American

According to the Meyers Konversations-Lexikon (1885–90), peoples included in the Mongoloid race are North Mongol, Chinese and Indochinese, Japanese and Korean, Tibetan and Burmese, Malay, Polynesian, Maori, Micronesian, Eskimo, and Native American.

In 1909, a map published based on racial classifications in South Asia conceived by Herbert Hope Risley classified inhabitants of Bengal and parts of Odisha as Mongolo-Dravidians, people of mixed Mongoloid and Dravidian origin. Similarly in 1904, Ponnambalam Arunachalam claimed the Sinhalese people of Sri Lanka were a people of mixed Mongolian and Malay racial origins as well as Indo-Aryan, Dravidian and Vedda origins. Howard S. Stoudt in The Physical Anthropology of Ceylon (1961) and Carleton S. Coon in The Living Races of Man (1966) classified the Sinhalese as partly Mongoloid.

German physical anthropologist Egon Freiherr von Eickstedt, an influential proponent of Rassenkunde (racial studies) in Nazi Germany, classified people from Nepal, Bhutan, Bangladesh, East India, parts of Northeast India, western Myanmar and Sri Lanka as East Brachid, referring to people of mixed Indid and South Mongolid origins. Eickstedt also classified the people of central Myanmar, Yunnan, southern Tibet, Thailand and parts of India as Palaungid deriving from the name of the Palaung people of Myanmar. He also classified the Burmese, Karen, Kachin, Shan, Sri Lankans, Tai, South Chinese, Munda and Juang, and others as having "mixed" with the Palaungid phenotype.

Commenting on the situation of the United States in the early 20th century, Leonard Lieberman said that the notion of the whole world being composed of three distinct races, Caucasoid, Mongoloid, and Negroid, seemed credible because of the history of immigration to the United States with most immigrants coming from three areas, Southeast China, Northwest Europe, and West Africa. This made the point of view of three races appear to be "true, natural, and inescapable".

In 1950, UNESCO published their statement The Race Question. It condemned all forms of racism, naming "the doctrine of inequality of men and races" among the causes of World War II and proposing to replace the term "race" with "ethnic groups" because "serious errors ... are habitually committed when the term 'race' is used in popular parlance".

==== Subraces according to Kroeber ====
Alfred L. Kroeber (1948), Emeritus Professor of Anthropology at the University of California, Berkeley, referring to the racial classification of humankind on the basis of physical features, said that there are basically "three grand divisions." Kroeber indicated that, within the three-part classification, the Mongoloid, the Negroid, and the Caucasian are the three "primary racial stocks of mankind." Kroeber said that the following are the divisions of the Mongoloid stock: the "Mongolian proper of East Asia," the "Malaysian of the East Indies," and the "American Indian." Kroeber alternatively referred to the divisions of the Mongoloid stock as the following: "Asiatic Mongoloids," "Oceanic Mongoloids," and "American Mongoloids." Kroeber said that the differences among the three divisions of the Mongoloid stock are not very large. Kroeber said that the Malaysian and the American Indian are generalized type peoples while the Mongolian proper is the most extreme or pronounced form. Kroeber said that the original Mongoloid stock must be regarded as being more like the current Malaysians, the current American Indians, or an intermediate type between these two. Kroeber said that it is from these generalized type peoples, who kept more nearly the ancient type, that peoples such as the Chinese gradually diverged, who added the oblique eye, and a "certain generic refinement of physique." Kroeber said that, according to most anthropometrists, the Eskimo is the most particularized sub-variety out of the American Mongoloids. Kroeber said that in the East Indies, and in particular the Philippines, there can at times be distinguished a less specifically Mongoloid strain, which has been called the "Proto-Malaysian," and a more specifically Mongoloid strain, which has been called the "Deutero-Malaysian." Kroeber said that Polynesians appear to have primary Mongoloid connections by way of the Malaysians. Kroeber said that the Mongoloid element of Polynesians is not a specialized Mongoloid. Kroeber said that the Mongoloid element in Polynesians appears to be larger than the definite Caucasian strain in Polynesians. Speaking of Polynesians, Kroeber said that there are locally possible minor Negroid absorptions, as the ancestral Polynesians had to pass by or through archipelagoes which are presently Papuo-Melanesian Negroid to get to the central Pacific.

=== Coon's Origin of Races ===
American anthropologist Carleton S. Coon published his much debated Origin of Races in 1962. Coon divided the species Homo sapiens into five groups: Besides the Caucasoid, Mongoloid, and Australoid races, he posited two races among the indigenous populations of sub-Saharan Africa: the Capoid race in the south and the Congoid race.

Coon's thesis was that Homo erectus had already been divided into five different races or subspecies. "Homo Erectus then evolved into Homo Sapiens not once but five times, as each subspecies, living in its own territory, passed a critical threshold from a more brutal to a more sapient state."

Since Coon followed the traditional methods of physical anthropology, relying on morphological characteristics, and not on the emerging genetics to classify humans, the debate over Origin of Races has been "viewed as the last gasp of an outdated scientific methodology that was soon to be supplanted."

=== Disproof by modern genetics ===
The fact that there are no sharp distinctions between the supposed racial groups had been observed by Blumenbach and later by Charles Darwin.

With the availability of new data due to the development of modern genetics, the concept of races in a biological sense has become untenable. Problems of the concept include: It "is not useful or necessary in research", scientists are not able to agree on the definition of a certain proposed race, and they do not even agree on the number of races, with some proponents of the concept suggesting 300 or even more "races". Also, data are not reconcilable with the concept of a treelike evolution nor with the concept of "biologically discrete, isolated, or static" populations.

=== Current scientific consensus ===
After discussing various criteria used in biology to define subspecies or races, Alan R. Templeton concludes in 2016: "[T]he answer to the question whether races exist in humans is clear and unambiguous: no."

== Features ==
=== General appearance ===
The last edition of the German encyclopedia Meyers Konversations-Lexikon (1971–79, 25 volumes) lists the following characteristics of the "Mongoloid" populations of Asia: "Flat face with a low nasal root, accentuated zygomatic arches, flat-lying eyelids (which are often slanting), thick, tight, dark hair, dark eyes, yellow-brownish skin, usually short, stocky build."

=== Skull ===
In 2004, British anthropologist Caroline Wilkinson gave a description of "Mongoloid" skulls in her book on forensic facial reconstruction: "The Mongoloid skull shows a round head shape with a medium-width nasal aperture, rounded orbital margins, massive cheekbones, weak or absent canine fossae, moderate prognathism, absent brow ridges, simple cranial sutures, prominent zygomatic bones, broad, flat, tented nasal root, short nasal spine, shovel-shaped upper incisor teeth (scooped out behind), straight nasal profile, moderately wide palate shape, arched sagittal contour, wide facial breadth and a flatter face."

=== Cold adaptation ===
In 1950, Carleton S. Coon, Stanley M. Garn, and Joseph B. Birdsell proposed that the relative flatness of "Mongoloid" faces was caused by adaption to the extreme cold of subarctic and arctic conditions. They supposed that "Mongoloid" eye sockets have been extended vertically to make room for adipose tissue around the eyeballs, and that the "reduced" brow ridges decrease the size of the air spaces inside of the brow ridges known as the frontal sinuses which are "vulnerable" to the cold. They also supposed that "Mongoloid" facial features reduce the surface area of the nose by having nasal bones that are flat against the face and having enlarged cheekbones that project forward which effectively reduce the external projection of the nose.

Still, in 1965 a study by A. T. Steegmann showed that the so-called cold-adapted Mongoloid face provided no greater protection against frostbite than the facial structure of Europeans.

== Use in United States law ==
In 1858, the California State Legislature enacted the first bill of several that prohibited the attendance of "Negroes, Mongolians and Indians" from public schools, amending its code in 1885 to make separate schools for "children of Mongoloid or Chinese descent." By 1911, the Bureau of Immigration and Naturalization was using the term "Mongolic grand division," not only to include Mongols, but "in the widest sense of all," to include Malays, Chinese, Japanese, Koreans, and "East Indians," a term which included the peoples of "India, Farther India, and Malaysia". A 1987 report to the National Institute of Justice indicated that the following skeletal collections were of the "Mongoloid" ethnic group: Arctic Eskimo, Prehistoric North American Indian, Japanese, and Chinese.

In 1985, Michael P. Malone of the FBI Laboratory said that the FBI Laboratory is in a good position for the examination of Mongoloid hairs, because it does most of the examinations for Alaska, which has a large Mongoloid population, and it conducts examinations for the majority of Indian reservations in the United States. A 2005 article in a journal by the FBI Laboratory defined the term "Mongoloid" for its use in forensic hair examinations as, "an anthropological term designating one of the major groups of human beings originating from Asia, excluding the Indian subcontinent and including Native American Indians."

== Use as a term for Down syndrome ==
"Mongoloid" has had a second usage, now generally avoided as highly offensive: until the late 20th century, people with Down syndrome were often referred to as "Mongoloids", or in terms of "Mongolian idiocy" or "Mongolian imbecility". The term was motivated by the observation that people with Down syndrome often have epicanthic folds. Coined in 1908, the term remained in medical usage until the 1950s. In 1961, its use was deprecated by a group of genetic experts in an article in The Lancet due to its "misleading connotations". The term continued to be used as a pejorative in the second half of the 20th century, with shortened versions such as mong in slang usage.

In the 21st century, this usage of the term is deemed "unacceptable" in the English-speaking world and has fallen out of common use because of its offensive and misleading implications. The terminology change was brought about both by scientific and medical experts as well as people of Asian ancestry, including those from Mongolia.

== See also ==
- Craniofacial anthropometry
- Orientalism
- Proto-Mongoloid
- Race (human categorization)
- Race and genetics
