= Joseph Birdsell =

American anthropologist

- Born: Joseph Benjamin Birdsell; March 30, 1908; South Bend, Indiana, US
- Died: March 5, 1994 (aged 85); Santa Barbara, California, US
- Education: Massachusetts Institute of Technology, Harvard University
- Occupation: anthropologist
- Known for: study of Aboriginal Australians
- Notable work: The Birdsell model
- Relatives: John Birdsell (grandfather)
- Awards: Guggenheim Fellowship (1946)

Joseph Benjamin Birdsell (March 30, 1908 – March 5, 1994) was an American anthropologist known for his work on Indigenous Australians, which spanned from the 1930s through to the 1970s. He was a long-serving professor of anthropology at the University of California, Los Angeles (UCLA). He is best known for his "tri-hybrid" model of human migrations into Australia, which proposed three distinct waves of racially distinct populations. The "Birdsell model" was popular in the mid-20th century, but was later found to be unsupported by scientific evidence.

== Early life ==
Birdsell was born on 20 March 1908 in South Bend, Indiana. He was the third child of Jane (née Defrees) and John Comly Birdsell. His father worked for the Birdsell Manufacturing Company, which had been founded by his paternal grandfather John Birdsell, the inventor of the Birdsell Clover Huller.

Birdsell attended the Phillips Exeter Academy in New Hampshire. He went on to study aeronautical engineering at the Massachusetts Institute of Technology, graduating Bachelor of Science in 1931. He subsequently worked in New York City as a financial analyst for several years. In 1935, Birdsell commenced a Ph.D. at Harvard University's anthropology department, with Earnest Hooton.

== Australian work ==
After meeting Australian anthropologist Norman Tindale, of the South Australian Museum and University of Adelaide, in 1936 when Tindale visited the US, Birdsell made his first field study in Australia in 1938. In May 1938, the two men and their wives visited Cummeragunja Aboriginal reserve in New South Wales, as part of an extensive anthropological survey of Aboriginal reserves and missions across Australia. Tindale would study the genealogies, while Birdsell undertook the measuring, and with government support the pair travelled across south-east Australia, parts of Queensland, Western Australia, and Tasmania. and returned periodically to study microevolutionary processes.

Together with Tindale, in field-work over 1938–39 in the Cairns rainforest, he concluded that the Indigenous "pygmy" peoples there, which they collectively called Barrineans, belonged to a group that were genetically distinct from the majority of Australian Aboriginal peoples, perhaps related to the Aboriginal Tasmanians. A photo exists showing Birdsell, (height 6 feet 1 inch), with a 24-year-old male of the Gungganyji tribe (4 feet, 6 inches), taken at the Mona Mona Aboriginal Mission, near Kuranda (This hypothesis was later debunked, although the myth persists among some even today.)

== Later career ==
Birdsell completed his doctoral degree at Harvard in 1941.

After teaching briefly at the State College of Washington, he served as an Army Air Corps officer in World War II. He taught anthropology at UCLA from 1948 until his retirement in 1974, continuing his research, and writing many articles and a widely used textbook on human evolution. He was an associate editor of the American Journal of Physical Anthropology from 1948 to 1951. His lifework was summarised in a monograph published in 1993 by Oxford University Press.

Birdsell was awarded a Guggenheim Fellowship in 1946, and several of his field seasons in Australia were financed by the Carnegie Corporation. He had a productive 50-year collaboration with Tindale. He also collaborated with U.S. physical anthropologist Earnest Hooton, who was professor at Harvard when he was a graduate student.

Birdsell conducted further research in Australia from 1952 to 1954 and in 1973, "revisiting many of the people examined in the earlier expedition, as well as their descendants, and extending into northern and southern Western Australia and western South Australia".

== Death and legacy ==
He died on March 5, 1994, in Santa Barbara of bone cancer.

== The Birdsell model ==
Early scholars had tended to view the peopling of Australia as the result of three separate waves of immigration, with distinct human types. Birdsell took a biological approach and did extensive work on anthropometrics to buttress his conjecture. This trihybrid model was resurrected and espoused by Birdsell, and became a standard part of Australian history down from the 1940s. It was adopted by the then doyen of Australian historians, Manning Clark in his 6 volume history of the country. In a recent polemic, Keith Windschuttle and Tom Gittin observed that the model had dropped from view, and attributed political motives to its disappearance off the popular and academic radar. McNiven and Russell argue that the trihybrid theory was discarded as the natural outcome of advances in archaeological work on the populating of the Australian continent, and that Birdsell's theory's initial popularity was due to the old colonial mentality informing opinion, which saw in the successive wave theory support for the dispossession (in a fourth wave) of Aboriginal people and to undermine native title claims.

In his seminal paper of 1977, "The recalibration of a paradigm for the first peopling of Greater Australia", he examined the standard models for the origins of Aboriginal Australians regarding how human migration from Southeast Asia could cross the Sahul barrier. Birdsell theorized a distinctive model challenging the accepted view, outlining three variants for a northerly model positing a route through Sulawesi, and two for a conduit to the southern continent via Timor.

== Publications ==
His publications included:

- Birdsell, Joseph, B. (1986). "Some predictions for the Pleistocene based on equilibrium systems among recent hunter gatherers". In Lee, Richard & Irven DeVore (ed.). Man the Hunter. Aldine Publishing Co. p. 239.
- Birdsell, Joseph 1987. Some reflections on fifty years in biological anthropology in Annual Review of Anthropology 16(1):1–12.
- Norman B. Tindale and Joseph B. Birdsell, "Results of the Harvard-Adelaide Universities Anthropological Expedition, 1938-1939: Tasmanoid Tribes in North Queensland", Records of the South Australian Museum, 7 (1), 1941–3, pp 1–9
- Tindale and Birdsell, "Tasmanoid Tribes in North Queensland"
- Joseph Birdsell, "A preliminary report on the trihybrid origin of the Australian aborigines", American Journal of Physical Anthropology, 28 (3), 1941, p 6
- J. B. Birdsell, "Preliminary data on the trihybrid origin of the Australian Aborigines", Archaeology and Physical Anthropology in Oceania, 2 (2), 1967, pp 100–55;
- Joseph B. Birdsell, "Microevolutionary Patterns in Aboriginal Australia", Oxford University Press, New York, 1993. (Review)
- J. B. Birdsell and W. Boyd, "Blood groups in the Australian Aborigines", American Journal of Physical Anthropology, 27, 1940, pp 69–90;
- Joseph Birdsell, "Results of the Harvard-Adelaide Universities Anthropological Expedition, 1938-39: The racial origins of the extinct Tasmanians", Records of the Queen Victoria Museum, II (3), 1949
- J. B. Birdsell, "Human Evolution: An Introduction to the New Physical Anthropology", Houghton Mifflin, Boston (1972) (Amazon, Google books)
- J. B. Birdsell, Carleton S. Coon and Stanley M. Garn, "Races: a Study of Race formation in Man" (1950)

== See also ==
- Mbabaram people

== Sources ==
- Allen, Jim; O'Connell, James F. (2008). "Getting from Sunda to Sahel". In Clark, Geoffrey Richard; O'Connor, Sue; Leach, Bryan Foss (eds.). Islands of Inquiry: Colonisation, Seafaring and the Archaeology of Maritime Landscapes. Australian National University. pp. 31–46. ISBN 978-1-921-31390-5.
- Clark, Manning (1979) [First published 1962]. A History of Australia. Vol. 1. Melbourne University Press. ISBN 978-0-522-84165-7.
- Dixon, R. M. W. (2011). Searching for Aboriginal Languages: Memoirs of a Field Worker. Cambridge University Press. ISBN 978-1-108-02504-1.
- "Joseph Birdsell; UCLA Anthropologist Studied Aborigines". Los Angeles Times. April 9, 1994.
- Mai, Larry L. (1994). Obituary: Joseph Benjamin Birdsell. University of California, Los Angeles.
- McNiven, Ian J.; Russell, Lynette (2005). Appropriated Pasts: Indigenous Peoples and the Colonial Culture of Archaeology. Rowman Altamira. ISBN 978-0-759-10907-0.
- Pannell, Sandra (2009). "Aboriginal Cultures in the Wet Tropics". In Stork, Nigel; Turton, Stephen M. (eds.). Living in a Dynamic Tropical Forest Landscape. John Wiley & Sons. pp. 59–70. ISBN 978-1-444-30033-8.
- Windschuttle, Keith; Gittin, Tom (June 2002). "The extinction of the Australian pygmies". Quadrant.
