= David Watt =

Dave or David Watt may refer to:

- Davey Watt (born 1978), Australian motorcycle speedway rider
- David Watt (computer scientist) (born 1946), British computer scientist
- David Watt (judge), Canadian lawyer, judge, author, and professor
- David Watt (Australian cricketer) (1916-2015), Australian cricketer
- David Watt (New Zealand cricketer) (1920-1996), New Zealand cricketer and periodontist
- Davie Watt (1885-1917), Scottish golfer

== See also ==
- David Watts (disambiguation)
