= Kirati tribes =

The Kirāta, Kiranti or Kirati is a generic term in Sanskrit literature for people who lived in the mountains, particularly in the Eastern Himalayas Particularly in Nepal ,Sikkim , North Bengal and Northeast India and who are postulated to have been Mongoloid in origin.
