= Proto-Mongoloid =

Outdated classification of humans

Proto-Mongoloid is an outdated racial classification of human beings based on a now-disproven theory of biological race. In anthropological theories of the 19th and 20th centuries, proto-Mongoloids were seen as the ancestors of the Mongoloid race.

Notable examples of fossils that were formerly thought to belong to the proto-Mongoloid group are found in Late Pleistocene (Upper Paleolithic) fossils, notably the Minatogawa skeletons and the Liujiang crania.
