= A. Roberto Frisancho =

Biological anthropologist

- Born: February 4, 1939 (age 87); Cusco, Peru
- Known for: developmental human adaptation
- Scientific career
- Fields: biological anthropologist
- Workplaces: University of Michigan

A. Roberto Frisancho (born February 4, 1939) is a biological anthropologist and the Arthur F. Thurnau Professor of Anthropology at the University of Michigan. He is the 2008 recipient of the Franz Boas Distinguished Achievement Award in Anthropology bestowed by the American Human Biology Association. He is best known for his work on developmental human adaptation to extreme environments such as high altitudes, growth, anthropometry and evaluation of nutritional status. Specifically, he advanced the hypothesis and demonstrated that the origin of adult variability of biological phenotypic traits are function of the effects and adaptations to environmental conditions that the organism makes during the developmental stage. Within this conceptual framework, he has contributed numerous papers on bioenergetics, the nutrition and developmental determinants of pre-natal and post-natal growth including teenage pregnancy. In 2013, he received the Charles Darwin Lifetime Achievement Award bestowed by the American Association of Physical Anthropologists.

== Early life ==
Frisancho was born on February 4, 1939, in Cusco, Peru, speaking both Spanish and Quechua as a child. He attended the Tourist Guide School of Cusco and worked as a tour guide in Cusco and Machu Picchu. That job allowed Frisancho to develop an interest in anthropology and expand his linguistic skills and become fluent in multiple languages (including Spanish, Quechua, English, French and Portuguese). Later in 1962 he graduated with a Bachelor in Humanities from the National University of San Antonio Abad of Cusco. Upon graduating, he married Hedy G. Moscoso and had two sons, Roberto Javier and Juan Frisancho. In 1963 he won a Fulbright fellowship and went to Pennsylvania State University to study biological anthropology. During that time, he cultivated his interest in physiological, cultural, and developmental adaptations to extreme environments such as high altitude, cold, heath, under-nutrition and over-nutrition.

== Career ==
In 1969, he received his Ph.D. in Anthropology from Pennsylvania State University and subsequently became a Research Scientist at the University of Michigan Center for Human Growth and Development and Assistant Professor of Anthropology at the Department of Anthropology. In 1972 he was named Fellow of the American Association for the Advancement of Science.

He was the recipient of the LS&A Excellence in Education Award in 1996, 1997, and 1998, and the Amoco Distinguished Faculty Achievement Award in 1997. In 1999 he was named the Arthur A. Thurnau Professor of Anthropology. In June 2006, he was awarded the title of Honorary Professor of Anthropology of the National University of San Antonio Abad of Cusco and in April 2008 received the Franz Boas Distinguished Achievement Award from the American Human Biology Association. In 2013, he received the Charles Darwin Lifetime Achievement Award bestowed by the American Association of Physical Anthropologists.

His research interest focuses on the connection between biology, evolution and culture in determining the expression of biological traits. His approach seeks to evaluate contemporary biological traits as byproducts of past biological adaptations both in contemporary and evolutionary perspective. He is also interested in anthropometric standards for the evaluation of child and adult growth and nutritional status.
