= Earnest Hooton =

American physical anthropologist (1887–1954)

- Hooton
- Born: November 20, 1887; Clemansville, Wisconsin, US
- Died: May 3, 1954 (aged 66); Cambridge, Massachusetts, US
- Education: University of Wisconsin–Madison
- Known for: Racial classification
- Awards: Viking Fund Medal (1947)
- Scientific career
- Fields: Physical anthropology
- Doctoral students: Harry L. Shapiro; Carleton S. Coon; Arthur R. Kelly; William W. Howells; Frederick S. Hulse; Alice M. Brues; Sherwood L. Washburn; Joseph Birdsell; William S. Laughlin

Earnest Albert Hooton (November 20, 1887 – May 3, 1954) was an American physical anthropologist known for his work on racial classification and his popular writings such as the book Up From The Ape. Hooton sat on the Committee on the Negro, a group that studied the supposed "anatomy of blacks."

== Biography ==
Earnest Albert Hooton was born in Clemansville, Wisconsin, the third child and only son of an English-born Methodist minister married to a Canadian-born woman of Scotch-Irish ancestry. He was educated at Lawrence University in Appleton, Wisconsin. After earning his BA there in 1907, he won a Rhodes Scholarship to Oxford University, which he deferred in order to continue his studies in the United States. He pursued graduate studies in classics at the University of Wisconsin–Madison, where he received an MA in 1908 and a Ph.D. in 1911 on "The Pre-Hellenistic Stage of the Evolution of the Literary Art at Rome", and then continued on to England. He applied for and was awarded a Rhodes scholarship, electing to study at Oxford. There he assisted in the excavation of Viking boat burials. Studying with R.R. Marett, he received a diploma in 1912 and with Marett's strong support he secured a teaching position at Harvard for the next four decades. During this time, he was also Curator of Somatology at the nearby Peabody Museum of Archaeology and Ethnology.

With the beginning of the First World War, he was disqualified from military service due to the nearsightedness, but nonetheless he volunteered for training at the Civilian Military Training Center at Plattsburgh, New York, and became a passable rifleman at 100 yards. He also helped revise recruitment standards because too large a number of American immigrants were too short to qualify for service at the time.

Hooton was elected to the American Academy of Arts and Sciences in 1927.

During the 1930s, between the two World Wars, his data collections helped U.S. Army make better-fitting military equipment, such as uniforms, tank helmets, gas masks, and aircraft seats, long before Le Gros Clark coined ergonomics for civilian (commercial) use.

He was elected to the American Philosophical Society in 1931 and the United States National Academy of Sciences in 1935.

After World War II, he surveyed commuters in Boston's North Station to help make more comfortable train seats, as described in his book A Survey of Seating.

He was one of the founding members of the American Association of Physical Anthropologists, serving as president from 1936 to 1938 and associate editor of the American Journal of Physical Anthropology from 1928 to 1942, working closely with Aleš Hrdlička.

Hooton amended the great Latin playwright Terence's saying, "Homo sum: humani nihil a me alienum puto" ("I am a man; nothing about men is alien to me") to "Primas sum: primatum nihil a me alienum puto" ("I am a primate; nothing about primates is alien to me").

Hooton was also a public figure known for popular volumes with titles like Up From the Ape (1931), Apes, Men, and Morons (1937), and Young Man, You are Normal (1945). He argued for studying nonhuman primates as a way to better understand humankind, making him an early advocate for primatology. He was also a cartoonist and wit, and, like his contemporaries Ogden Nash and James Thurber, created poems and drawings that were eventually collected and published.

After reaching the official retirement age (65), he was invited to teach courses that had decreased in enrollment. He died unexpectedly of a vascular accident while teaching.

He was survived by his wife Mary Camp Hooton, whom he married in 1913, by two sons (Newton and Jay), one daughter (Emma Hooton Robbins), and two grandchildren.

== Race ==
Hooton used comparative anatomy to divide humanity up into races, describing the morphological characteristics of different "primary races" and "subtypes." In 1926, the American Association of Physical Anthropology and the National Research Council organized a Committee on the Negro, which focused on the anatomy of black people. Among those appointed to the Committee were Hrdlička, Earnest Hooton and eugenist Charles Davenport. In 1927, the committee endorsed a comparison of African babies with young apes. Ten years later, the group published findings in the American Journal of Physical Anthropology to "prove that the negro race is phylogenetically a closer approach to primitive man than the white race." Hooton played a key part in establishing the racial stereotypes about black athleticism and black criminality of his day in terms of an anthropological framework. Hooton was one of the first to attempt to develop mathematically rigorous criteria for race typology.

At the same time, Hooton maintained that no scientific basis existed correlating mentality with racial variation. "Each racial type runs the gamut from idiots and criminals to geniuses and statesmen. No type produces a majority of individuals from either end of the scale. While there may be specific racial abilities and disabilities, these have not yet been demonstrated. There are no racial monopolies either of human virtues or of vices." While advocating eugenic sterilizations of those deemed "insane, diseased, and criminalistic", he emphasized there was no justification to correlate such "degeneracy", as he termed it, with race.

Anthropologist Pat Shipman presents Hooton's work as representing a transition in anthropology away from its 19th-century stereotypes about race and its fixation over cranial measurements. In that context, she writes, Hooton maintained an "oversimplistic mode of thinking about human types and variability" while at the same time he moved to eliminate unfounded racial biases and pseudoscience. His remarks in a 1936 conference dealing with immigration, for example, included a ten-point summary of the current scientific consensus about race which, in retrospect, parallel the points raised ten years later in UNESCO's landmark The Race Question.

=== The "Hooton Plan" ===
In 1943, Hooton had an article entitled "Breed War Strain Out of Germans" published in the New York newspaper PM. In the article he proposed four measures with an objective to "destroy German nationalism and aggressive ideology while retaining and perpetuating desirable German biological and sociological capacities". Hooton wrote these measures as follows:

1. Execute or imprison for life all leaders of the Nazi party; permanently exile all professional army officers.
2. For a period of 20 years or more utilize the bulk of the present German army as rehabilitation labor units in devastated areas of the Allied Nations in Europe and elsewhere. These laborers should not be treated as prisoners of war or convicts but as paid employees (supervised and restricted as to movement from the area of their work). They might be allowed the privilege of naturalization upon evidence of good behavior. The single men should be permitted to marry only women of the country of their abode or naturalization.

The families of the men already married should remain in Germany for a period of years, but might eventually be permitted to join the fathers. The latter should not be allowed to return to Germany. The objects of this measure include reduction of the birth rate of "pure" Germans, neutralization of German aggressiveness by outbreeding, and denationalization of indoctrinated individuals.

1. Break up the German Reich into several states (probably its original component states), permitting each, after a suitable interval of supervision and government by the Allied Nations, to choose its own form of non-Fascist government. The object of this measure is to destroy the national framework of unified German aggression.
2. During the period of supervision and occupation of the several states by armies and civilian staffs of the Allied Nations, encourage members of these groups to intermarry with the German women and to settle there permanently. During this period encourage also the immigration and settlement in the German states of non-German nationals, especially males.

=== Hooton on African Americans (1930–1940) ===
Hooton derided "the legal fiction that 'all men are born free and equal'" as "one of the most stupendous falsehoods ever uttered by man." In Up From the Ape, however, he also argued that intelligence testing, in its infancy at the time, did not yet provide a scientifically rigorous basis for comparing the relative mental capabilities of humanity's geographic divisions:

Until we know exactly how to distinguish a race and exactly what intelligence tests test, we shall have to hold in suspension the problem of racial mental differences. That such differences exist I have not the slightest doubt; that with our present methods they can be summarized quantitatively so that we are justified in assigning one race a position of superiority as contrasted with another, I deny.

The chapter from Up From the Ape that discusses this subject in the context of the alleged inferiority of sub-Saharan Africans was reproduced in 1932 under the title "Is the Negro Inferior" in The Crisis, the magazine of the National Association for the Advancement of Colored People.

=== Hooton on the Celtic Race in Ireland ===
Hooton led the examinations of skulls found in Ireland by the "Harvard Archaeological Mission to Ireland" (1932–36), with Clarence Wesley Dupertuis and Helen Lucerne Dawson, that was sponsored by the Irish Free State government.

== Quotations ==
- "The fitness of any man to live in any community depends on his ability to fall in with its ways. If he is very unadaptable, he is a criminal. He is not blond or dark. He is not tall or short. He is not German or Irish. He is a man who has been woven into American social fabric, who thinks as his fellow citizens do about accepted institutions and who conduct himself as they do. By his deeds is he to be judged: not by his looks or his geographic origin." —(New York Times, 1936).
- "There is no anthropological ground whatever for selecting any so-called racial groups, or any ethnic or national group, or any linguistic or religious group, for preferment of condemnation. Our real purpose should be to segregate and eliminate the unfit, worthless, degenerate and anti-social portion of each racial and ethnic strain in our population, so that we may utilize the substantial merits of the sound majority, and the special and diversified gifts of its superior members." —(New York Times, 1936).
- "It is not until genetics is so far advanced that we can apply its findings to the human race that such measurements as those made by me acquire real scientific Value. There is no superior or pure races in the world." —(New York Times, 1934).

== Criticism ==
E.B. Reuter, a sociologist and contemporary of Hooton, criticized Hooton for using circular logic when he ascribed the physical traits of criminals to cause criminality.

Sherwood Washburn, who studied under Hooten, credited him as an engaging, sharp teacher but wrote that his research methods were "not compatible with genetics" and he was often "simply incorrect."

Hooton believed that the world's problems were fundamentally biological, and that improvement would only come when the breeding of the biologically inferior was controlled. He considered the environment, but minimized its importance. These views, coupled with the concept of pure races (Nordic, for example) in the 1930s and 40s led to severe criticism.

== Works ==
- Africana. I-5 co-editor (1917) 'recording the habits of foul or barbarous savages' pub. Peabody Museum. From Internet Archive.
