= Carleton S. Coon Jr. =

American diplomat

Carleton Stevens Coon Jr. (1927 – December 3, 2018) was a career foreign service officer who served as the American Ambassador to Nepal. At the time, his wife Jean (née Abell) served as Ambassador in Dacca, Bangladesh. He died on December 3, 2018, in Warrenton, Virginia.

== Career ==
A Harvard graduate (majoring in geography), Coon joined the Foreign Service upon graduating in 1949 and served in West Germany, Syria, India, Iran, Nepal and Morocco.

== Personal life ==
Coon was the son of anthropologist Carleton S. Coon and his wife Mary.
