= John Birdsell =

American manufacturer and inventor (1815–1894)

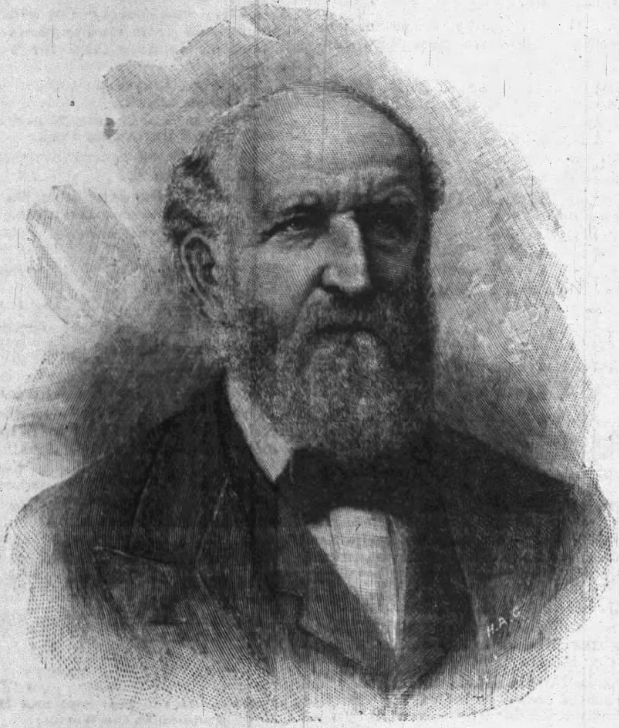
- Birdsell in 1894 newspaper
- Born: John Comly Birdsell; March 31, 1815; Westchester County, New York, U.S.
- Died: July 13, 1894 (aged 79); New Carlisle, Indiana, U.S.
- Resting place: South Bend City Cemetery; South Bend, Indiana, U.S.
- Occupations: Manufacturer; inventor; farmer
- Known for: inventing the Birdsell Clover Huller
- Political party: Republican
- Spouses: Harriet Lunt (m. 1838; died 1869) Susan Snelling (m. 1879)
- Children: 5
- Relatives: Joseph Birdsell (grandson)

John Comly Birdsell (March 31, 1815 – July 13, 1894) was an American manufacturer and businessman from New York. He was known for inventing the Birdsell Clover Huller and founding the Birdsell Manufacturing Company.

== Early life ==
John Comly Birdsell was born on March 31, 1815, in Westchester County, New York, to Charity (née Carpenter) and Benjamin Birdsell. In 1822, Birdsell moved to western New York. He attended the district school and the village academy in West Henrietta, New York. In 1836, Birdsell rented a farm near Mendon.

== Career ==
In 1839, Birdsell purchased a farm of 284 acres (115 ha) in Rush. In 1855, Birdsell invented the Birdsell Clover Huller, a machine for threshing clover. His machine received first prize at the 1857 New York State Fair. He also received awards at the Ohio State Fair and Michigan State Fair. He built a small factory for his machine at Quaker Hill in West Henrietta, but the business was not successful. By the end of 1858, Birdsell had sold 26 hullers. He attempted to sell his patent to C. Altman, a manufacturer of reapers in Canton, Ohio, but Altman declined. Birdsell built shops in South Bend, Indiana, in 1863. In 1864, his offices in West Henrietta burned down.

Birdsell moved to South Bend in April 1864. Birdsell sold his farm in New York for US$30,000 in 1865. He incorporated Birdsell Manufacturing Company in 1870. In 1872, Birdsell built a new factory on South Columbia Street. In April 1874, Judge Noah Haynes Swayne of the Northern Ohio District Court upheld Birdsell's patent. Birdsell won a US$100,000 verdict against patent infringers, including Angus McDonald & Co. and the Ashland Manufacturing Company. By the 1880s, the Birdsell Manufacturing Company was successful.

Birdsell was a Republican and later supported the Prohibition movement. He was one of the organizers and served as vice president of the St. Joseph County Savings Bank.

== Personal life ==
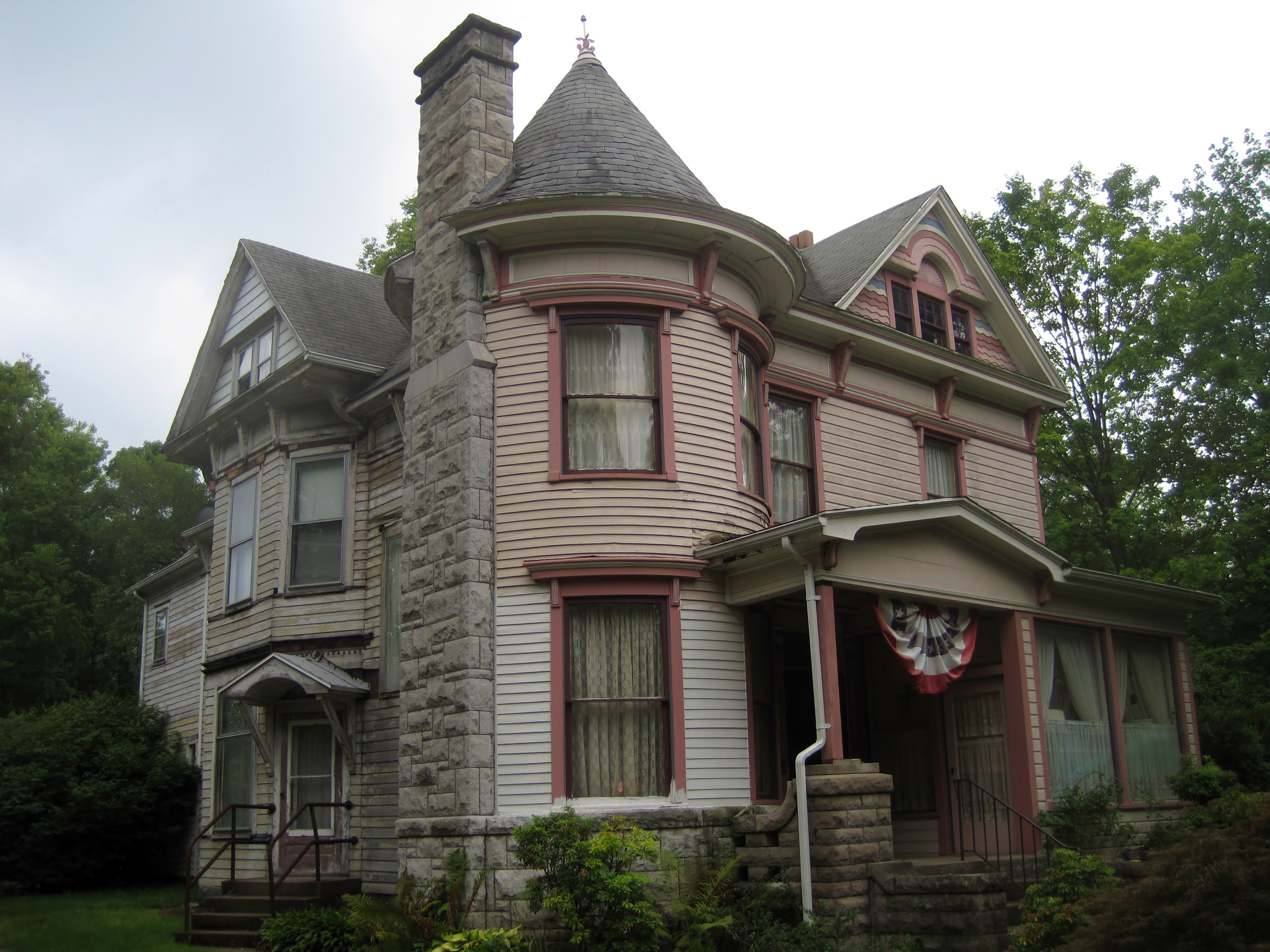
Birdsell House in South Bend (2012)

Birdsell married Harriet Lunt on June 7, 1838. They had five children, including Varnum Ogilvie (1841–1875), Joseph Benjamin (born 1843), Byron A. (born 1847), Harriet Elizabeth (1856–1863) and John "Jed" Comly Jr. (born 1859). His wife died in April 1869. In June 1879, Birdsell married Susan Snelling of Boston. His grandson Joseph Birdsell was an anthropologist. In 1880, Birdsell and his wife traveled abroad to Europe, Egypt and the Holy Land.

Birdsell was a Freemason and was a member of South Bend's Knights Templar.

Birdsell died from a stroke on July 13, 1894, at the home of Mrs. Egbert in New Carlisle, Indiana. He was buried at South Bend City Cemetery.

== Legacy ==
Following his death, Birdsell's sons continued the Birdsell Manufacturing Company until 1938.

Birdsell Street in South Bend is named after Birdsell.
