= Carleton Putnam =

American segregationist (1901–1998)

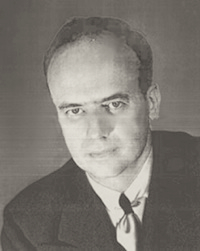
- Born: December 19, 1901; New York City, New York
- Died: March 5, 1998 (aged 96); Charlottesville, Virginia
- Education: Princeton University; Columbia Law School (LLB)
- Occupations: Businessman, writer
- Spouse: Esther Auchincloss

Carleton Putnam (December 19, 1901 – March 5, 1998) was an American businessman, writer and advocate for racial segregation. He graduated from Princeton University in 1924 and received a Bachelor of Laws (LL.B.) from Columbia Law School in 1932. He founded Chicago & Southern Airlines in 1933 which, in 1953, merged with Delta Air Lines. Putnam later served as chairman of Delta Air Lines and held a seat on its board of directors until his death.

== Life and career ==
Putnam was born to a prominent family from New England, his mother Louise Carleton Putnam, was the daughter of New York publishing magnate George W. Carleton. Paternally, he was a lineal descendant of American Revolutionary War general Israel Putnam. He was also related to the physical anthropologist Carleton Coon, with whom he corresponded closely regarding theories of anatomical and biological differences between human races. He was raised as part of the American Episcopal Church and remained a lifelong member.

=== Race and Reason ===
Putnam's best known work is Race and Reason: A Yankee View (1961), a book critical of desegregation which originated in a letter he wrote to Dwight Eisenhower protesting about the end of segregation in U.S. public schools. According to Putnam, the immediate impetus for his letter to Eisenhower was the concurring opinion of Justice Frankfurter in Cooper v. Aaron, 358 U.S. 1 (1958), which Putnam refers to as "the recent Little Rock case". Elsewhere in the book Putnam critiques Brown v. Board of Education, 347 U.S. 483 (1954), calling for its reversal.

Psychologist Henry Garrett wrote the introduction. In his review of the book for the American Bar Association Journal, Stuart B. Campbell wrote:

The purpose of the book is to direct public attention to the danger inherent in the integration decision (Brown v. Board of Education, 347 U. S. 483), to demonstrate its fallacious foundation, and to point out the remedy available to prevent possible national disaster.

Putnam hoped the book would educate the American people "in the principles upon which our republic was based and through which it grew to greatness. Neither equality nor integration were among them."

After Race and Reason was made required reading for high school students in Louisiana, the American Association of Physical Anthropologists (AAPA) passed a resolution condemning it. Louisiana-born Neo-Nazi, Ku Klux Klan leader and politician David Duke said that reading Race and Reason as a teenager led to what Duke called his "enlightenment"; it convinced him that blacks were inferior to whites.

Putnam also wrote a biographical book on Theodore Roosevelt's youth that was praised by Edmund Morris, the author of the best known biography of that president. Putnam admired Roosevelt's belief that "Teutonic (and) English blood is the source of American greatness".

Carleton Putnam died of pneumonia on March 5, 1998. He was survived by his wife, Esther Mackenzie Willcox Auchincloss, a daughter, three grandchildren, a stepdaughter, and three step-grandchildren. He was previously married to Lucy Chapman Putnam.

== Works ==
- High Journey: A Decade in the Pilgrimage of an Air Line Pioneer (New York: Charles Scribner's Sons, 1945.)
- Theodore Roosevelt: A Biography. Volume One, The Formative Years, 1858-1886. (New York: Charles Scribner's Sons, 1958.)
- Race and Reason: A Yankee View (Washington D.C.: Public Affairs Press, 1961.)
- Framework for Love, A Study in Racial Realities: Address at the University of California at Davis with Subsequent Questions and Answers (Washington D.C.: National Putnam Letters Committee, 1964.)
- Race and Reality: A Search for Solutions (Washington D.C.: Public Affairs Press, 1967.)
