= Robert Jurmain =

American anthropologist (1948 - 2021)

Robert Douglas Jurmain
- Born: 1948
- Died: 2021 (aged 72–73)
- Education: Harvard University
- Spouse: Lynn Kilgore
- Scientific career
- Fields: Physical Anthropology; Paleopathology; Paleoepidemiology
- Workplaces: San Jose State University
- Thesis: Distribution of Degenerative Joint Disease in Skeletal Populations (1975)
- Doctoral advisor: William W. Howells

Robert Jurmain (1948 – 2021) was an American physical anthropologist.

Jurmain earned an A.B. in anthropology from UCLA and a Ph.D. in Biological Anthropology from Harvard. He joined the San Jose State faculty in 1975, and taught there until his retirement in 2004.

He is the co-author of several textbooks, including Introduction to Physical Anthropology, that "...had an enormous impact on generations of students and scholars". In addition, his monograph Stories from the Skeleton: Behavioral Reconstruction in Human Osteology (Gordon and Breach, 1999, ISBN 90-5700-541-7) discusses the problem of determining what a person did, based only on markers in the person's bones such as fractures or evidence of osteoarthritis. Jurmain demonstrates that much past inference of this type has been based on flawed or circular reasoning, and instead argues that a more rigorous approach to this sort of research is called for.
