= Sherwood Washburn =

American physical anthropologist (1911–2000)

Sherwood L. Washburn
- Born: November 26, 1911; Cambridge, Massachusetts, United States
- Died: April 16, 2000 (aged 88); Berkeley, California
- Education: Harvard University
- Known for: Comparative approach to understanding human evolution, renaissance of behavioral primatology
- Awards: Viking Fund Medal, Huxley Memorial Medal and Lecture, Distinguished Service Award of the American Anthropological Association
- Scientific career
- Fields: Anthropology
- Workplaces: Columbia University College of Physicians and Surgeons, University of Chicago, University of California, Berkeley
- Doctoral advisor: Earnest A. Hooton
- Doctoral students: Irven DeVore, Shirley C. Strum, F. Clark Howell, Vincent M. Sarich, Jane Lancaster, Ralph Holloway

Notes
- Designated by the AAPA as the premier American physical anthropologist of the twentieth century

Sherwood Larned Washburn (November 26, 1911 – April 16, 2000), nicknamed "Sherry", was an American physical anthropologist, and "a legend in the field." He was a pioneer in the field of primatology, opening it to the study of primates in their natural habitats. His research and influence in the comparative analysis of primate behaviors to theories of human origins established a new course of study within the field of human evolution. He changed the field of anthropology with the publication of his paper The New Physical Anthropology, in 1951, in which he argued, convincingly, that human variation was continuous, and could not be broken up into discontinuous races.

== Biography ==
He was born and raised in Cambridge, Massachusetts to Henry Bradford Washburn Sr., dean of the Episcopal Theological School in Cambridge, and Edith Buckingham Hall. He was the younger brother of Henry Bradford Washburn. In his youth, Washburn took a keen interest in the field of natural history, and during school vacations worked with exhibits and collections in Harvard's Museum of Comparative Zoology.

Washburn graduated summa cum laude from Harvard University with a bachelor's degree in Anthropology in 1935, followed by a Ph.D. in anthropology in 1940. For a time, Washburn considered pursuing his doctorate in zoology, and in his first year in graduate school, worked as an assistant with a zoological expedition in southern Asia called the Asiatic Primate Expedition. His work as a graduate student in comparative anatomy, comparative psychology, animal locomotion mechanics, and paleontology helped shape in him a multi-disciplinary perspective toward the study of evolutionary origins.

Washburn married Henrietta Pease in 1938, and they had two children, Sherwood "Tuck" and Stan. They subsequently resided in New York, Chicago, Illinois and Berkeley, California, where Sherwood held university positions. Washburn died in Berkeley in 2000 at age 88.

== Harvard ==
Washburn entered Harvard's graduate program with the intention of pursuing a doctorate in zoology. His focus shifted to anthropology after being induced to attend an introductory seminar on the subject led by his freshman advisor and close family friend Alfred Tozzer. Finding the mixture of archaeology, customs and human evolution stimulating, he joined the physical anthropology program led by Earnest Hooton where he was able to enfold his zoological coursework such as comparative anatomy and paleontology in his approach to the study of human evolution. Doctoral students in Harvard's physical anthropology program were forced to look beyond the anthropology department to secure the necessary training, which Washburn considered fortuitous because the experience left him with deep appreciation how much more can be learned when a multidisciplinary effort is brought into the analysis.

While studying for his doctorate, Washburn received his first opportunity to engage in fieldwork. He served as an assistant zoologist in Harold J. Coolidge's 1935–1936 Asiatic Primate Expedition. In Malaysia he helped collect specimens of various species of colobine and macaque monkeys and the orangutan. In Sri Lanka and Thailand he also collected specimens of lar gibbon and observed their behavior in natural surroundings. He continued this work on the collection when he returned to Harvard, at times assisted by Gabriel Lasker. Washburn would later credit the ongoing discussions between Lasker and himself during this period (1938) as formative to his views about human variability. To Washburn, human variability was to be understood in terms of population genetics, and not according to the terms of racial and constitutional typology as typified by his doctoral advisor, Hooton.

His doctoral thesis was a metrical appraisal of proportions in the skeletons of adult macaques and langurs. His doctorate, awarded in 1940, was the first from Harvard's anthropology department to be awarded for a study of non-human primates.

== Career ==
Upon graduating Harvard, Washburn accepted a position as associate professor of anatomy in Columbia University College of Physicians and Surgeons, where he remained for eight years. From 1947 to 1958 he was a professor of anthropology at the University of Chicago, for a time serving as department chair. He left the University of Chicago for a professorship in University of California, Berkeley, where he remained until his retirement in 1979. In 1975 the university elected him to the appointment of University Professor, one of 35 such appointments granted since the position was first created in 1960.

Washburn insisted that proper interpretation of primate anatomy and human behavioral evolution required comparative information from living primates in their natural settings. According to a history of primatology by Shirley C. Strum (a former student of Washburn's) and Linda Fedigan, Washburn's stance was a crucial influence on post-WWII primate field studies in the United States. Washburn and his students used an evolutionary framework with a straightforward underlying argument: "All primates, whether human or nonhuman, shared certain adaptive features, a 'primate pattern' believed to vary little across contexts and species." However, this belief in a single 'primate pattern' was toppled in the decades that followed, as field researches discovered that primate groups were far more diverse than Washburn and others had assumed.

== Published works ==
- Social Life of Early Man, New York, Viking Fund, 1961
- Evolution of a Teacher Annual Review of Anthropology. 1983.
- "The Evolution of Man", Scientific American v239 n3 p194–208 September 1978
- Human evolution: Biosocial perspectives, edited with Elizabeth McCown, Menlo Park, California: Benjamin/Cummings Pub. Co. 1978
- Ape Into Man; A Study of Human Evolution, Boston: Little, Brown. 1973.
