= Hiram Richard Hulse =

The Rt Revd Hiram Richard Hulse
- Cuba
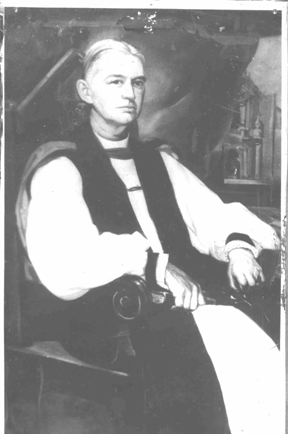
- Province: The Episcopal Church
- Diocese: Cuba
- Installed: 1915
- Term ended: 1938
- Predecessor: Albion W. Knight
- Successor: Alexander H. Blankingship

Orders
- Consecration: January 12, 1915

Personal details
- Born: September 15, 1868
- Died: April 10, 1938 (aged 69)
- Denomination: Episcopalian
- Spouse: Frances B. Seymour
- Children: Mary Hulse, Frederick S. Hulse, Charity Hulse
- Occupation: Bishop
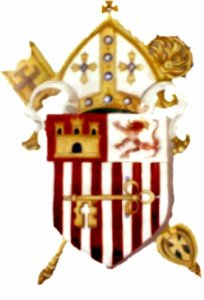
- Coat of arms

Hiram Richard Hulse (September 15, 1868 - April 10, 1938) was the second missionary Bishop of the Diocese of Cuba in the Episcopal Church.

== Early life ==
Hulse was born to Richard Hulse and Selina Richards. In the first decade of the 20th century, the new rector of St. Mary's in Harlem, the Rev. Hiram Richard Hulse, urged construction of a new sanctuary. In 1908 the demolition took place of the old white frame church and, on the same site, construction of the brick Carrere & Hastings building with cast stone detail and bell cote. The first service was held on New Year's Day, 1909.

Hulse married Frances Burrows Seymour on May 20, 1903, and had three children: Mary, Frederick, and Charity. Hulse and his wife were among the passengers aboard the cruise ship SS Morro Castle when it caught fire on September 8, 1934, killing 137 passengers and crew.

== Episcopate ==
On 12 January 1915, in New York City, Hiram Hulse was consecrated as a bishop in Cuba for the Protestant Episcopal Church assisted by Bishop de Landes Berghes in the Mathew line.

== See also ==
- List of Succession of Bishops for the Episcopal Church, USA

== Sources ==
- Annual Address (1922)
- Marriage Notice

Episcopal Church (USA) titles
| Preceded by Albion W. Knight | 2nd Bishop of Cuba; 1915-1938 | Succeeded by Alexander H. Blankingship |
