= Harry L. Shapiro =

American anthropologist and eugenicist (1902–1990)

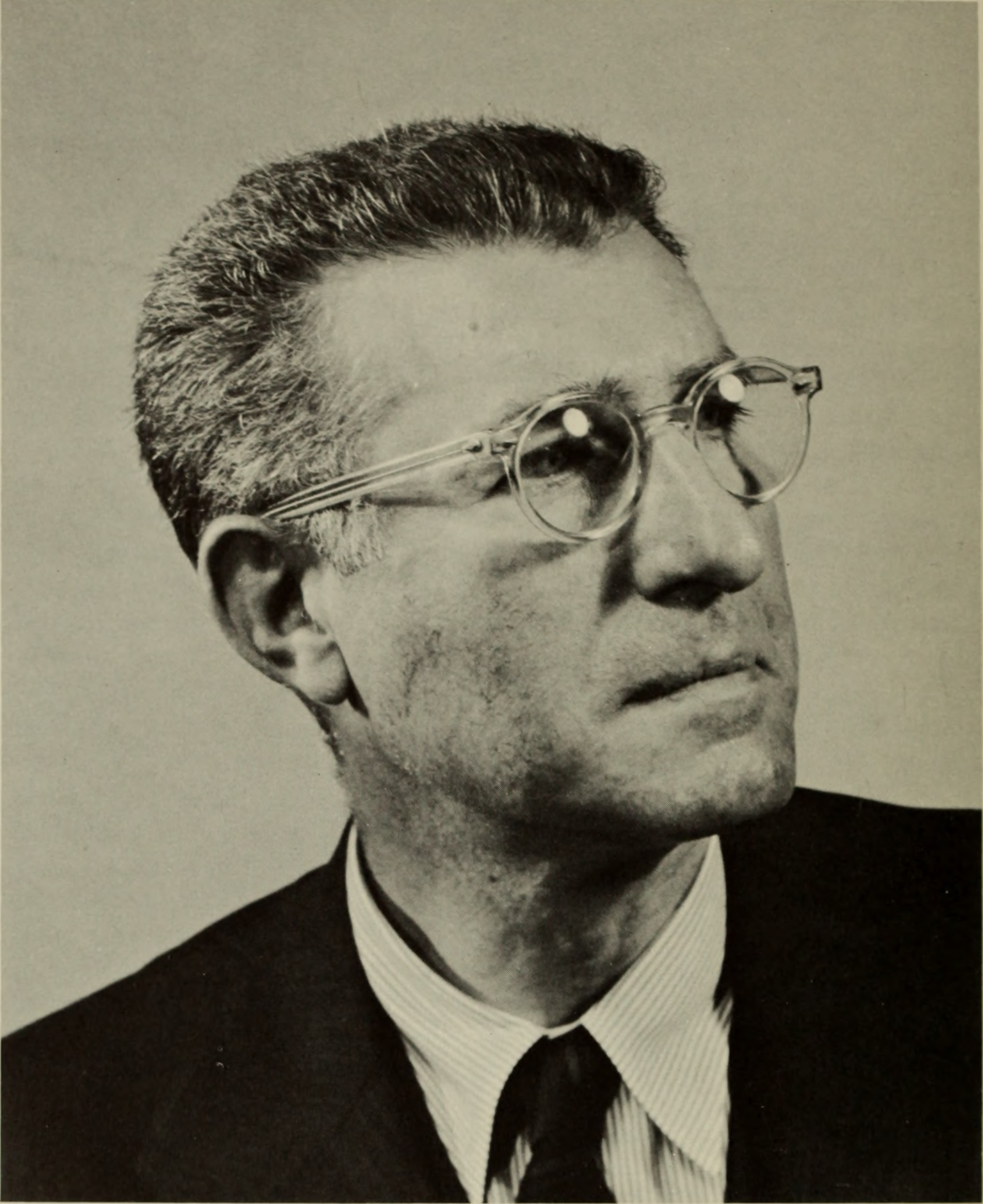
- Shapiro in the 1960s
- Born: March 19, 1902
- Died: January 7, 1990 (aged 87)

Harry Lionel Shapiro (March 19, 1902 – January 7, 1990) was an American anthropologist and eugenicist.

== Biography ==
Shapiro was born into a Jewish family and was educated in Boston, Massachusetts.

While he was a senior at Harvard he was awarded a graduate fellowship from Yale in 1923 in Biology to pursue a genetic study of the descendants of the mutineers of HMS Bounty. Shapiro was a student of Earnest Hooton at Harvard University.

After completing his graduate work in Biology with specialization in Anthropology in 1926, he went to work at the American Museum of Natural History in New York City, and while there conducted a few field trips. He is also known for his work with Frederick S. Hulse on Japanese migrant studies.

Shapiro was appointed associate curator at the American Museum of Natural History in 1931 and full curator in 1942, the year he succeeded Clark Wissler as chair of the Department of Anthropology. He remained department chair until 1970. Shapiro concurrently taught at Columbia University as an adjunct Professor of Anthropology from 1938 to 1973.

Shapiro was a founding member of the American Association of Physical Anthropologists in 1930 (AAPA) and between 1935 and 1939 served a term as its secretary and subsequently as vice-president (1941–42). He served as president of the American Anthropological Association in 1948, and president of the American Ethnological Society from 1942 to 1943. He was elected to the National Academy of Sciences (NAS) in 1949 and served as chairman of the anthropology section from 1953 to 1957. He was president of the American Eugenics Society from 1955 to 1962. Shapiro married Janice Sandler in 1938 and together they had three children, Thomas, Harriet and James.

== Selected bibliography ==
- The Heritage of the Bounty (1936; now retitled The Pitcairn Islanders)
- Migration and Environment (1939)
- Aspects of Culture (1956)
- Man, Culture and Society (editor; 1956)
- Peking Man (1974)
- The Jewish People: A Biological History (1976)
