= Frederick S. Hulse =

American anthropologist

Frederick Seymour Hulse (February 11, 1906 – May 16, 1990) was an American anthropologist.

Hulse was born in New York City in 1906 to Hiram Richard Hulse and the former Frances Burrows Seymour. He had two sisters, Mary and Charity. His parents survived the SS Morro Castle disaster in 1934, which claimed 137 lives. On August 26, 1934, in California, he married Leonie Robinson Mills. She died in a car accident in 1982, in which Hulse himself was injured.

He became interested in anthropology after reading The Racial History of Man by Roland Dixon. Hulse was a student of Earnest Hooton. In his publications he discussed human races in terms of evolutionary dynamics. He is also known for his work with Harry L. Shapiro on Japanese migrant studies. He later became a Professor of Anthropology at the University of Arizona.

He received his BA and PhD from Harvard University.

== Works ==
- Physical types among the Japanese (1943)
- Man and nature: studies in the evolution of the human species (1975)
- The Human Species: an introduction to physical anthropology (1971)
