= David Watt (Australian cricketer) =

Australian cricketer

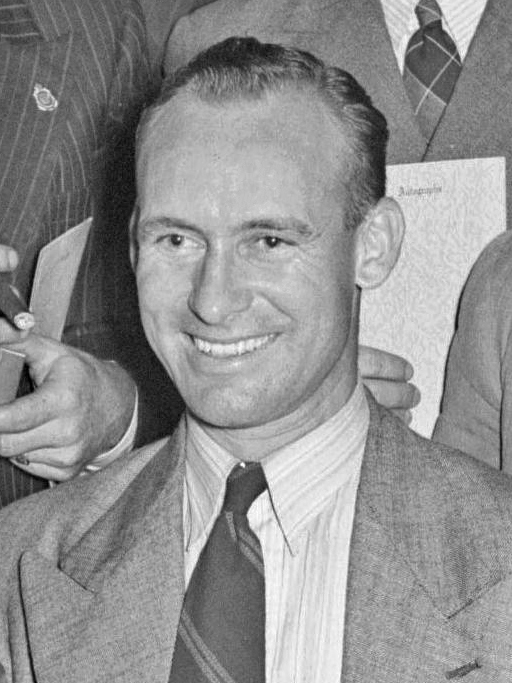
- Watt in 1948

Personal information
- Born: 24 November 1916; Edinburgh, Scotland
- Died: 25 September 2015 (aged 98); Perth, Western Australia
- Batting: Right-handed
- Bowling: Legbreak

Domestic team information
- Years: Team
- 1938/39–1948/49: Western Australia

Career statistics
Competition	First-class
Matches	17
Runs scored	1,079
Batting average	38.53
100s/50s	2/8
Top score	157
Balls bowled	301
Wickets	7
Bowling average	23.42
5 wickets in innings	0
10 wickets in match	0
Best bowling	2/2
Catches/stumpings	7/–
- Source: ESPNcricinfo, 27 May 2016

David Watt (24 November 1916 – 25 September 2015) was an Australian cricketer. He played seventeen first-class matches for Western Australia between 1938–39 and 1948–49. His son Keith was an Australian rules footballer who played in Subiaco's 1973 WANFL premiership winning side.
