= David P. Watts =

American anthropologist

David Watts is Alison Richard Professor of Anthropology at Yale University.

As a physical anthropologist he has studied chimpanzees and mountain gorillas. He directed the Karisoke Research Center in Rwanda founded by Dian Fossey for two years, and is doing research on chimpanzees in a long term study at Ngogo National Park in Uganda.
