= David George Watts =

David George Watts

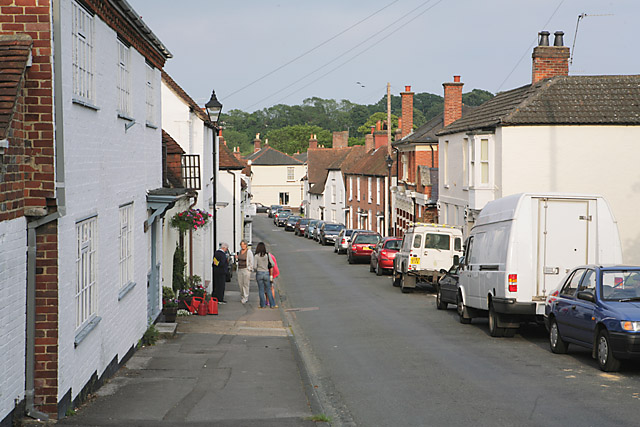
West Street, Titchfield

David George Watts (14 May 1931 – 14 October 2016), known as George Watts, was an English local historian closely associated with the work of the Victoria County History (VCH) and the history of Titchfield, Hampshire.

== Early life ==
David Watts was born on 14 May 1931, at the Old Inn House, West Street, Titchfield, Hampshire. His family were strawberry growers which was an important local industry. In a local history talk he recalled that as a boy he could walk from Titchfield to Warsash alongside strawberry fields the whole distance. His family aimed to harvest their first crop by mid-May and the berries were sold as far away as Glasgow.

Watts was educated locally and then at Price's School in Fareham and at University College, University of Oxford, where he took a first class degree in history. He subsequently completed a B.Litt in 1957 with a thesis on "The Estates of Titchfield Abbey c.1245 to c.1380".

== Career ==
Watts joined the VCH in 1956, working under Robert (R.B.) Pugh who was then the general editor of the work. Watts's first published contribution to the history was the entry for the parish of Wilsford in the Wiltshire volume (1962). He worked with Christopher Elrington on Warwickshire including Birmingham, Coventry, and the Borough of Warwick.

In 1959 he left the VCH to take up a lectureship in general studies at High Wycombe College. He was responsible for the establishment of the Open University in Hampshire and contributed to the creation of the University of the Third Age in Solent. His book The Learning of History (1972) was positively reviewed in the McGill Journal of Education and the British Journal of Educational Studies for its thoughtful approach to criticisms of the teaching of history that were current at the time. It was reprinted in 2016 in the Routledge Library Editions: Historiography series.

Watts wrote for the proceedings of the Hampshire Field Club and in the journal The Economic History Review. His research interests included the effect of the black death on Hampshire – in which he examined the speed with which the plague travelled using the evidence of court records and the payment of heriots – and the Hampshire strawberry-growing industry. He wrote the history of Titchfield in 1982, and at the time of his death was president of the Titchfield History Society.

== Death and legacy ==
Watts died on 14 October 2016. He was buried at the Woodland Cemetery, Eling, alongside his wife. A memorial service was held afterwards at St Peter's church. He was survived by two children.

== Selected publications ==
- "A Model for the Early Fourteenth Century", The Economic History Review, New Series, Vol. 20, No. 3 (December 1967), pp. 543–547.
- Environmental Studies. Routledge and Kegan Paul, London, 1969.
- The Learning of History. Routledge and Kegan Paul, London, 1972. ISBN 1317280725 (Reprinted 2016)
- Titchfield: A History. Titchfield History Society, Titchfield, 1982. ISBN 0950813117
- "The Black Death in Dorset and Hampshire" in T.B. James (Ed.) The Black Death in Wessex, The Hatcher Review, v. No. 46 (1998).
