= Birdsell Clover Huller =

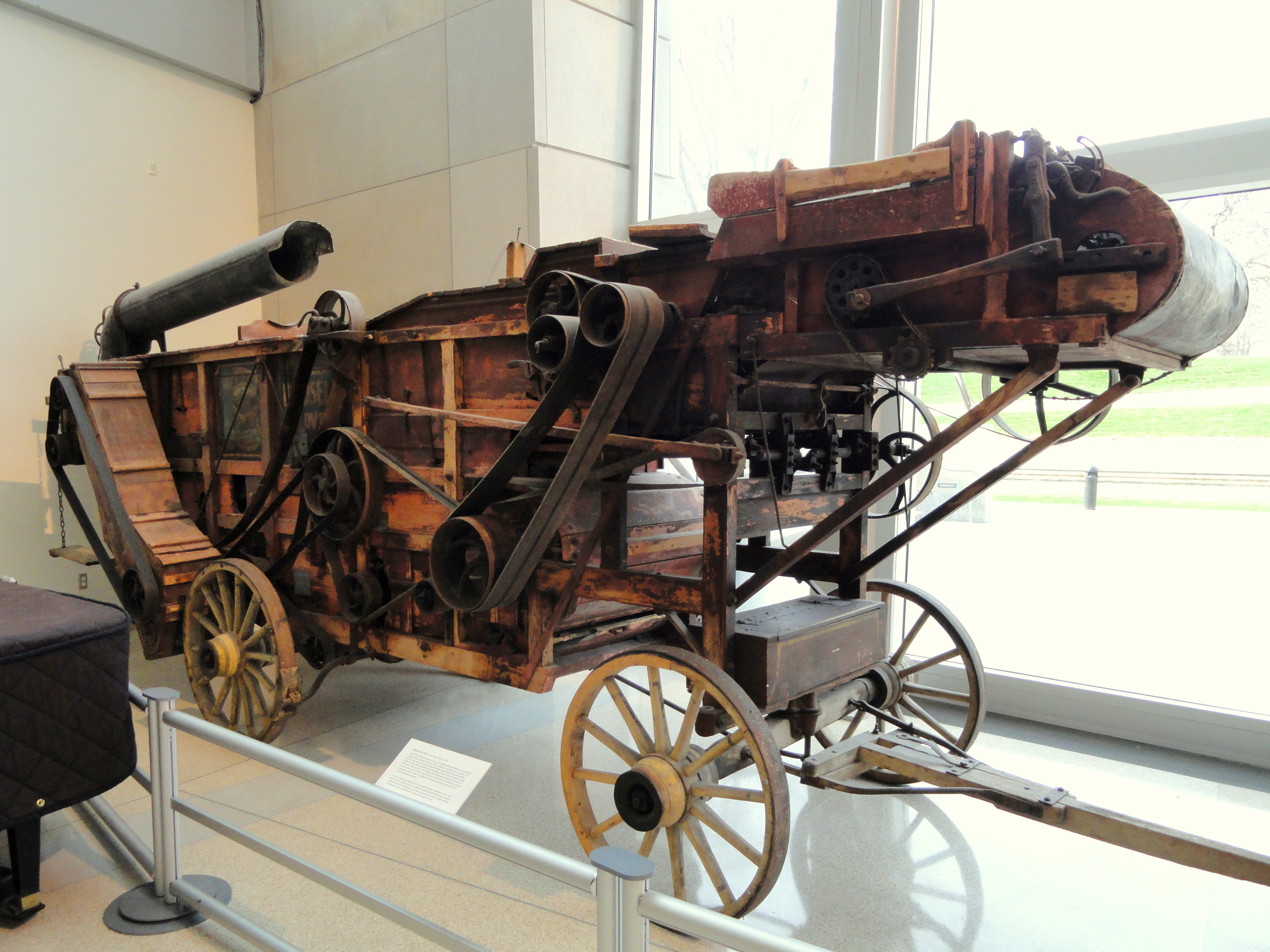
A Birdsell Clover Huller exhibited at the Indiana State Museum.

The Birdsell Clover Huller was invented by John Comly Birdsell in 1855 in West Henrietta, New York (near Rochester). His machine both removed the hulls from the clover (threshing), removed the seeds from the hulls (hulling), and cleaned the seeds so they can be used or sold for animal feed and/or soil nutrients. Until the mid-18th century, this work was done by hand and by animal power, requiring a tremendous amount of manual labor for a relatively small reward.

Clover was becoming a major cash crop throughout the burgeoning midwest, since its seeds could be used as an animal feed and nutrient for soil. Although there were separate machines available for threshing and hulling (plus human or animal powered methods), the process to separate the seed was very labor-intensive. Birdsell believed his machine, which combined the threshing, hulling, and cleaning actions into one process, could reduce the time and energy needed, and therefore increasing the amount of seed a farmer could produce.

John C. Birdsell continued to perfect his clover huller, and by 1857 he won first prize at the New York State Fair in Buffalo.

By the end of the 19th century, the Birdsell Clover Huller was the most popular clover huller in the United States. A farmer who invested a few hundred dollars in a Birdsell Clover Huller could use the seeds on his own farm as well as sell the excess to other farms. As the midwest replaced the east as the agricultural center of the United States, machines like the Birdsell Clover Huller (along with the Oliver Chilled Plow, the John Deere tractor, and a host of other new farm technologies) contributed towards America’s shift from small, subsistence level farming to large, industrial farming.

== Sources ==
Birdsell, Roger. “Birdsell: The Invention, The Family, The Company.” Accessed November 14, 2014. https://web.archive.org/web/20150506220235/http://centerforhistory.org/learn-history/business-history/birdsell-clover-huller-company.

Historic Preservation Commission of South Bend and Saint Joseph County. “Birdsell Residence: Historic and Architectural Significance,” May 1995.
