= Linda Marie Fedigan =

American-Canadian anthropologist and primatologist

Linda Marie Fedigan, CM FRSC (born 1949) is a Canadian-based American primatologist. From 2001 to 2015 she held the position of Canada Research Chair in Biological Anthropology and Primatology at the University of Calgary, Alberta. Prior to accepting her position at the University of Calgary, Fedigan was a professor at the University of Alberta, teaching anthropology from 1974 until 2001. In addition, Fedigan served as Executive Editor of the American Journal of Primatology (2004–2007) and held numerous editorial positions with a variety of primatological and biological anthropology journals, served on the Advisory Council for the Wenner-Gren Society, and hosted numerous national and international conferences. Fedigan was nominated as a Fellow of the Royal Society of Canada in 2005 and elected in 2016.

== Education ==
Fedigan was born in Oklahoma. Her father was in the American military, so the family had moved frequently and lived in several countries before she was 17. She attended the American College of Paris (1966–1968), then transferred to the University of Texas at Austin, where she completed bachelor's, master's and doctoral degrees. Originally, she planned to become a cultural anthropologist but — after realizing that asking people probing personal questions made her uncomfortable — she decided to focus on primatology. She earned a PhD in 1974 for her study of social roles in a transplanted troop of Japanese monkeys living on the Arashiyama West Primate Research Station at La Moca Ranch, Texas.

== Research ==
Fedigan's focus is on social structure, sex differences, reproduction, behavioural ecology and conservation of Costa Rica and Japanese monkeys. Fedigan was one of the first female primatologists who elected to study female life histories and male-female interactions. Past research projects include the Arashiyama West Primate Research Station, the Santa Rosa Primate Field Project and examinations of gender and science (descriptions included in this article).

=== The Arashiyama West-East Primate Project ===
Research on a group of Arashiyama Japanese macaques (Macaca fuscata) began near Kyoto, Japan in 1954. In the summer of 1966, the group naturally separated forming two troops and in 1972, one of the two troops was translocated to Texas for research and training of American and Japanese students. The troops were renamed Arashiyama West and East. In Texas, the troop of 150 macaques was given free range over a 42.4 ha enclosure of brushland. Fedigan was involved in this project in Texas from the time of translocation in 1972 until data collection ceased in 1996. From 1978 to 1979, she was Field Station Manager and spent over three years living with the macaques. Her research now focuses upon analysis of the data collected, in particular the reproductive and life history patterns in females. Male emigration, female kinship, inbreeding avoidance, the structure of group fission, friendship, and dominance and reproductive success are just a few of the ideas that were foreshadowed and/or influenced by the results from Arashiyama studies.

In 1991, Fedigan co-edited, with Pamela Asquith. The Monkeys of Arashiyama: 35 Years of Research in Japan and the West, SUNY Press. The work explores research on the Arashiyama Japanese macaques and Japanese and Western traditions in primate studies and reflects on how different cultural perspectives influence the manner in which the science of primatology is approached.

=== The Santa Rosa Primate Field Project ===
In 1983, with the cooperation of the Costa Rican government, Fedigan established the Santa Rosa Primate Field Project with the objective of describing the behavioural ecology, conservation parameters and life histories of three primate species inhabiting the park - white-faced capuchins (Cebus imitator), mantled howler monkeys (Alouatta palliata) and black-handed spider moneys (Ateles geoffroyi). The setting is Santa Rosa National Park which was established in 1970 and is located approximately 35 km northwest of Liberia, Costa Rica. The park consists of 108 square kilometres of land containing a mix of former pasture-land, dry deciduous forest and semi-evergreen forest. In addition to frequent censuses, Fedigan and her group of researchers have conducted intensive, longitudinal studies on several groups within the park, including life history data on selected female capuchins.

In 1998, Fedigan's work was the subject of a film produced by Omni Film Productions Ltd. entitled Costa Rican Monkeys. The film formed part of a series of recordings referred to as "Champions of the Wild" (Discovery Channel) focusing on endangered animals around the globe and the champions determined to save them.

Her research resulted in her coauthoring a book entitled "The Complete Capuchin" which explores the lives of capuchin monkeys in relation to their lives in nature, including their physical, mental and social characteristics. In addition, the book provides information about how humans have viewed, used and studied these monkeys from ancient times to the present.

=== Gender and science ===
Regarding gender and science, Fedigan's interest began with how the gender of the scientist affects research on sex differences and moved to a broader focus on the role of gender in scientific disciplines.

Fedigan has written numerous papers on the topic, including the role of women in models of human evolution, feminism and primatology, science and the successful female, and historical analyses of the effects of gender on changing views of life history research. She is also the first scholar to examine both the images of women in theories of human evolution and the role of women scientists in constructing these images.

In 1996, Fedigan co-hosted, with Shirley C. Strum, an international Wenner-Gren conference in Teresopolis, Brazil on "Changing Images of Primate Societies: The Role of Theory, Method and Gender." As a result of the conference, the two collaborated in 2000 in co-editing Primate Encounters: Models of Science, Gender and Society.

== Honours and awards ==
In 2013, Fedigan was honored with the Distinguished Primatologist Award from the American Society of Primatologists. On June 30, 2016, she was named a Member of the Order of Canada by Governor General David Johnston for "her contributions to advancing our understanding of the behaviour and society of several primate species and for her dedication as a mentor to the next generation of primatologists." In 2016, she was elected as a Fellow of the Royal Society of Canada.

== Publications ==
=== Books and monographs ===
- 2004 Fragaszy, D., Visalberghi, E. and Fedigan, L. M. The Complete Capuchin Monkey: The Biology of the Genus Cebus. Cambridge University Press .
- 2000 Strum, S. C. and Fedigan, L. M. (eds.) Primate Encounters. Models of Science, Gender and Society. University of Chicago Press. Reviews of Primate Encounters appear in Isis 93(1):168-9 (2002), J. Hist. Beh. Sci. 38(1):99-100 (2002), Times Lit. Suppl. (Aug 16, 2002), AJP 56:245-9 (2002), AJPA 116(2):178-9 (2001), Biol & Phil 17:285-99 (2002), Biol Digest 27(7) (2001), Ethol, Ecol & Evol 13(3) (2001), Frankfurt. A. Zeitung Feb 2001, Gorilla J. 21(2001), IJP 32(1): 227-9 (2002) Primate Eye 75: 52-3 (2001) Primate Tidings 4 (2001), Primates 46(2): 276-9 (2001).
- 1997 Fedigan, L. M. and Zohar, S. Sex Differences in Mortality of Japanese Macaques: Twenty-One Years of Data From the Arashiyama West Population. Am. J. Phys. Anthr. 102:161-175.
- 1992 Fedigan, L. M. Primate Paradigms (Second Edition). University of Chicago Press.
- 1991 Fedigan, L. M. and Asquith, P. J. (eds.) The Monkeys of Arashiyama: 35 Years of Research in Japan and the West. SUNY Press. Reviews of The Monkeys of Arashiyama appear in: AJPA 87:239-41; American Anthropologist 95:167-68; Ethology 93:258-64; Primates 33:148-150.
- 1982 Fedigan, L. M., Primate Paradigms: Sex Roles and Social Bonds. Montr: Eden Press, 400 pp. Reviews of Primate Paradigms appear in: Am. Anthr. 85:701 2; Am. J. Phys. Anthr. 61: 269 77; Am. J. Prim. 4:99 100; Anim. Behav. 31:2; IJP 12: 111 113; Man 18(3):607 8; Nature 302:359; Psych. Rep. 52:1011; Rev. in Anthr 11(2):79 87; Science 219:281; Z. fur Tierpsych. 66 (3 4):356.
- 1976 Fedigan, L. M., A study of roles in the Arashiyama West troop of Japanese monkeys (Macaca fuscata). A Monograph in the Series: Contributions to Primatology, volume 9. Basel: S. Karger Publ., 99 pp.
