= William W. Howells =

American anthropologist (1908 –2005)

- Born: William White Howells; November 27, 1908; New York City
- Died: December 20, 2005 (aged 97); Kittery Point, Maine
- Education: Harvard University
- Scientific career
- Fields: Anthropology
- Workplaces: Harvard University
- Doctoral advisor: Earnest A. Hooton
- Doctoral students: Paul T. Baker; C. Loring Brace; Henry Harpending; Robert Jurmain; Henry McHenry

William White Howells (November 27, 1908 – December 20, 2005) was a professor of anthropology at Harvard University.

Howells, grandson of the novelist William Dean Howells, was born in New York City, the son of John Mead Howells, the architect of the Chicago Tribune Tower, and Abby MacDougall White. He graduated with an S.B. in 1930 and obtained a doctorate from Harvard in 1934 and worked for the American Museum of Natural History. He lectured at the University of Wisconsin–Madison from 1937 to 1954, serving as a lieutenant in the Office of Naval Intelligence during World War II. He taught at Harvard from 1954 until his retirement in 1974.

He was president of the American Anthropological Association in 1951. In 1998, with his wife Muriel Seabury, Howells endowed the directorship of the Peabody Museum of Archaeology and Ethnology at Harvard.

== Honors ==
Howells was a member of the National Academy of Sciences and won many notable awards. He received the Viking Fund Medal in 1954; the Distinguished Service Award of the American Anthropological Association in 1978 and was honored by that association again in 1993 with the establishment of the William W. Howells Book Prize. In 1992 he won the Charles Darwin Lifetime Achievement Award from the American Association of Physical Anthropologists.

== Selected works ==
=== Books ===
- Howells, William W. (1944). Mankind So Far. Garden City, New York: Doubleday & Co.
- Howells, William W. (1948). The Heathens; Primitive Man and his Religions. Garden City, New York: Doubleday & Co.
- Howells, William W. (1954). Back of History: The Story of our own origins. Garden City, New York: Doubleday & Co.
- Howells, William W. (1959). Mankind in the Making: The Story of Human Evolution. Garden City, New York: Doubleday & Co.
- Howells, William W. (1962). Ideas on Human Evolution: Selected Essays, 1949–1961. Cambridge, MA: Harvard University Press.
- Howells, William W. (1973). Evolution of the Genus Homo. Reading, MA: Addison-Wesley.
- Howells, William W. (1973). The Pacific Islanders. New York: Scribners.
- Howells, William W. (1992). Getting Here: The Story of Human Evolution. Washington, D.C.: The Compass Press.

=== Monographs ===
- Howells, William W. (1973). Cranial Variation in Man: A Study by Multivariate Analysis of Patterns of Difference Among Recent Human Populations.
- Howells, William W. (1989). Skull Shapes and the Map: Craniometric Analyses in the Dispersion of Modern Homo.
- Howells, William W. (1995). Who's Who in Skulls: Ethnic Identification of Crania from Measurements.
