= Stanley Marion Garn =

American anthropologist (1922–2007)

Stanley Marion Garn (October 27, 1922 – August 31, 2007) was an American human biologist and educator. He was Professor of Anthropology at the College for Literature, Science and Arts and Professor of Nutrition at the School of Public Health at the University of Michigan. He joined the University of Michigan in 1968.

== Work ==
Garn graduated from Harvard University with a AB in 1942, AM in 1947, and PhD in 1952. Garn produced a large body of work on many areas of human biology, beginning with human hair and eventually contributing research on determinants of coronary artery disease, somatotype, human races, dental development, skeletal development, nutrition, obesity and bone mineralization, among other subjects. In relation to his study on obesity, he studied over-nutrition and under-nutrition, human fat over the course of the human life cycle and the correlation between growth rate in infants and later fatness. He concluded that genetics forms a major component in determining a person's tendency for obesity, but socioeconomic factors are also significant. Based on his study on age and cholesterol, he concluded that people between the ages of thirty and fifty have their serum cholesterol rise which contributes to an increase risk for coronary artery disease. In relation to bone, he studied skeletal development, bone mineral loss, odontogenesis and dysmorphogenesis. His hypothesis was that dietary differences contribute to bone loss among individuals.

Garn died of complications from peripheral vascular disease on August 31, 2007, in Ann Arbor Michigan.

== Race ==
Garn remains a pivotal figure in the history of biological interpretations of race. He modernized older classifications of race, attempting to bring the race concept into line with ideas in population biology. Garn considered racial classification based on physical traits to be imprecise. He considered physical traits to be independent of each other, making classification by the assumption that a population shares certain traits incorrect. Furthermore, he was critical about racial classifications based on physical type which seemingly elevated some physical traits to a racial status, but glossed over others. He concluded that racial classifications based on physical type can always be compartmentalized into smaller populations which share more physical traits in common. He used three gradations of racial classification which were increasingly more specific in scope: geographical, local and micro. He counted thirty-two local races in the world that had arisen from genetic isolation: (large local races) North-West European, North East European, Alpine, Mediterranean, Iranian, East African, Sudanese, Forest Negro, Bantu, Turkic, Tibetan, North Chinese, Extreme Mongoloid, South-East Asian, Hindu, Dravidian, North Amerindian, Central Amerindian, South Amerindian, Fuegian; (isolated small local races) Lapp, Pacific "Negrito", African Pygmy, Eskimo; (long-isolated marginal local races) Ainu, Murrayan Australian, Carpentarian Australian, Bushman and Hottentot; (hybrid population of known and recent origin) North American Colored, South African Colored, Ladino, Neo-Hawaiian. He believed the genetic isolation among Pacific Islanders had produced three separate races—Micronesians, Polynesians and Melanesians.

Regarding "geographical races", Garn said, "A collection of populations, separated from other such collections by major geographical barriers." Regarding "local races", Garn said, "A breeding population adapted to local selection pressures and maintained by either natural or social barriers to gene interchange." Regarding "micro-races", Garn said, "marriage or mating, is a mathematical function of distance. With millions of potential mates, the male ordinarily chooses one near at hand."

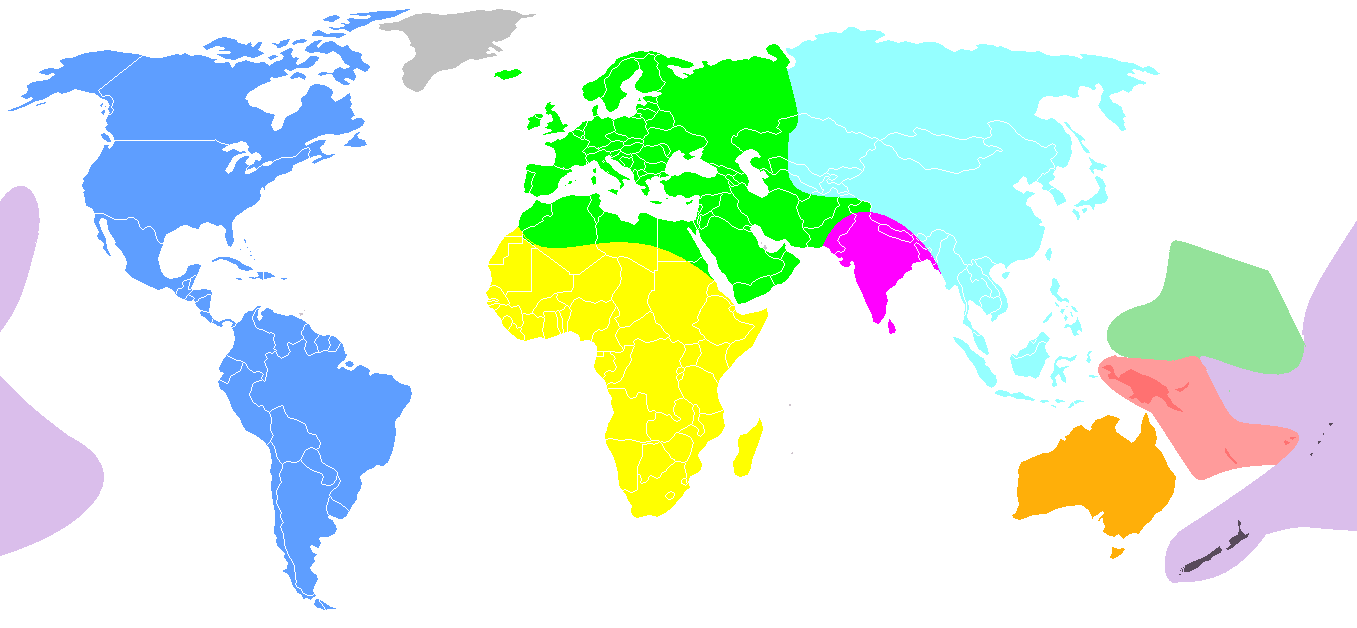
This map shows the racial classification scheme of the anthropologist Stanley Marion Garn in his book Human Races (1961) Archived March 27, 2009, at the Wayback Machine, although he considered thirty-two local subraces to exist within the nine major races.

1. African race (yellow)
2. Amerindian race (blue)
3. Asiatic race (aqua)
4. Australian race (orange)
5. European race (neon green)
6. Indian race (pink)
7. Melanesian-Papuan race (red)
8. Micronesian race (lime green)
9. Polynesian race (purple)
