= Hulse =

Hulse is a surname. Notable people with the surname include:

- Amber Hulse (born 1998), American politician from South Dakota
- Ben Hulse (1894–1961), American politician
- Benjamin Daniel Hulse (1875–1950), English professional footballer, played for Blackburn Rovers F.C.
  - Ben Hulse Highway
- Cale D. Hulse (born 1973), Canadian hockey player
- Camil Anton Johan van Hulse (1897–1988), Belgian-American musician
- Carl E. Hulse (born 1954), American journalist
- Charles Hulse (1771–1854), British politician and baronet
- Charles Westrow Hulse (1860–1901), English cricketer
- Chuck Hulse (1927–2020), American racecar driver
- David Lindsey Hulse (born 1968), American baseball player
- Edward Hulse (physician) (died 1711), English physician
- Sir Edward Hulse, 1st Baronet (c. 1682–1759)
- Sir Edward Hulse, 2nd Baronet (1714–1800)
- Sir Edward Hulse, 3rd Baronet (1744–1816), High Sheriff of Hampshire
- Sir Edward Hulse, 5th Baronet (1809–1899)
- Edward Hamilton Westrow Hulse (1889–1915), British Army officer and baronet
- Edward Henry Hulse (1859–1903), British politician and baronet
- Edward Jeremy Westrow Hulse (born 1932), baronet
- Edward Michael Westrow Hulse (born 1959), heir apparent to the Hulse baronetcy
- Erroll Hulse (1931–2017), South African pastor
- Frank Hulse (1913–1992), founder and former chairman of Southern Airways
- Frederick Seymour Hulse (1906–1990), American anthropologist
- Gary Hulse (born 1981), English rugby league player
- Hamilton John Hulse (1864–1931), baronet
- Hamilton Westrow Hulse (1909–1996), baronet
- Heriberto Hülse, Brazilian politician
- Hiram Richard Hulse (1868–1938), American bishop
- John Hulse (1708–1790), English theologian
  - Hulsean Lectures, University of Cambridge lecture series est. 1790
  - Hulsean Professor of Divinity
- Joseph H. Hulse (1923–2013), Canadian biochemist
- Melvin Hulse (1947–2022), Belizean politician
- Merlin Hulse (born 1923), American politician
- Michael Hulse (born 1955), British translator and poet
- Penelope Anne Hulse, New Zealand politician
- Richard Hulse (fl. 1790–1812), British major-general
- Bob Hulse (born 1948), English professional footballer, played for Stoke City F.C.
- Bobby Hulse (born 1957), English professional footballer, played for Darlington F.C.
- Robert Lester Hulse (born 1946), Belizean Olympic sports shooter
- Rob Hulse (born 1979), English professional footballer, played for Queens Park Rangers F.C.
- Rose Adkins Hulse (born 1980), British entrepreneur
- Russell Hulse (footballer), Belizean soccer player
- Russell Alan Hulse (born 1950), American physicist
  - Hulse–Taylor binary
- Samuel Hulse (1746–1831) British field marshal
- William F. Hulse (1920–1995), American runner and chemist

== Middle name ==
- Alfred Hulse Brooks (1871–1924), American geologist
- Cecile Hulse Matschat (1895–1976), American geographer and botanist

== See also ==
- Hulce
- Hulse baronets
