= Edward Hulse =

Edward Hulse may refer to:

- Sir Edward Hulse, 2nd Baronet (1714–1800) of the Hulse baronets
- Sir Edward Hulse, 3rd Baronet (1744–1816), High Sheriff of Hampshire
- Sir Edward Hulse, 5th Baronet (1809–1899), of the Hulse baronets
- Sir Edward Hulse, 6th Baronet (1859–1903), British politician
- Sir Edward Hulse, 7th Baronet (1889–1915), British Army officer
- Sir Edward Hulse, 10th Baronet (1932–2022), of the Hulse baronets
- Edward Hulse (physician, 1631–1711), English physician
- Edward Hulse (physician, 1682–1759), English physician
