= Royal Academy Exhibition of 1769 =

1769 art exhibition in London

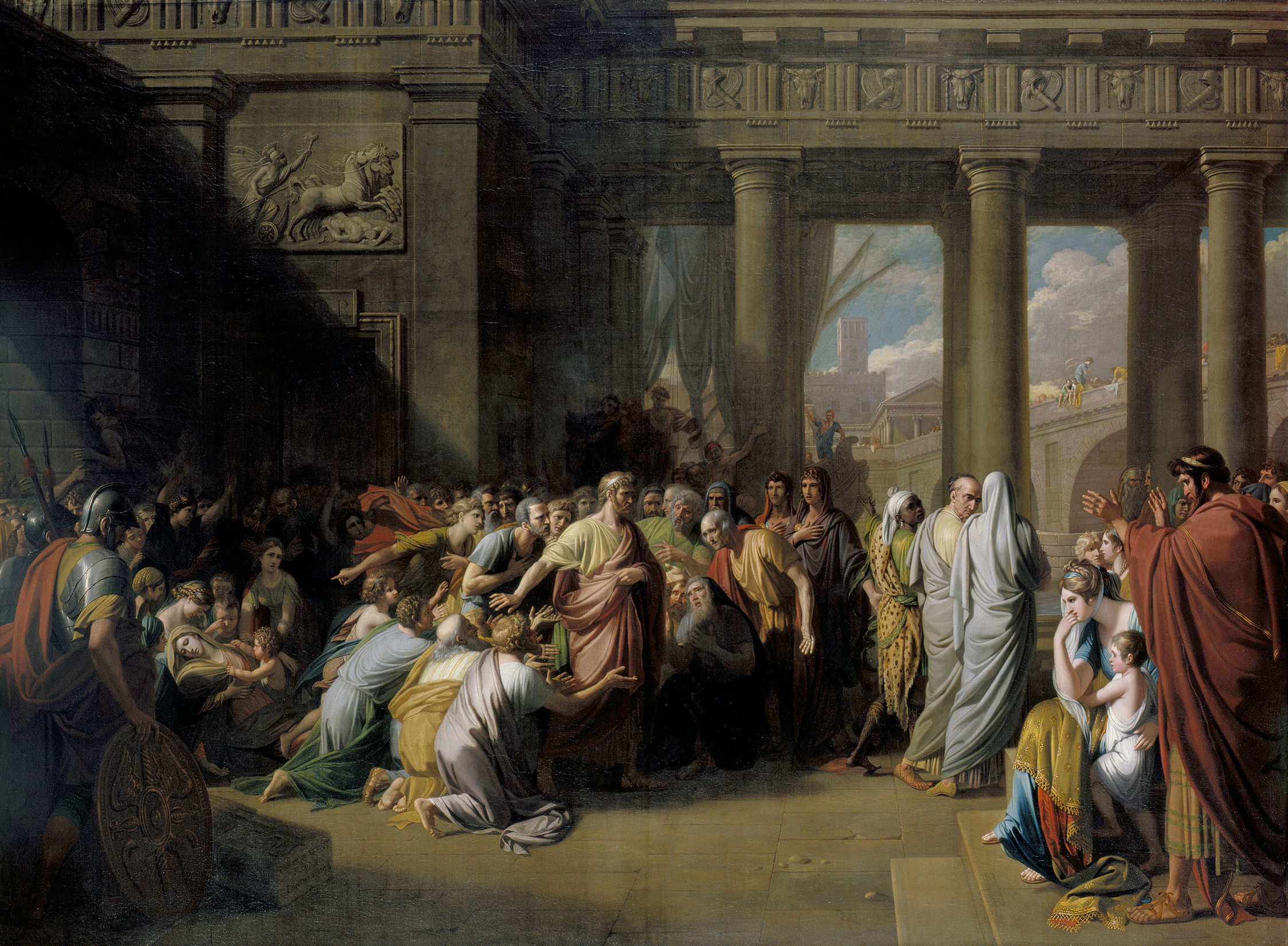
The Departure of Regulus by Benjamin West

The Royal Academy Exhibition of 1769 was the inaugural art exhibition of the British Royal Academy of Arts. It was held in Pall Mall in London between 25 April and 27 May 1769. It was the first Annual Exhibition of the academy, establishing a tradition that has stretched into the twenty-first century.

== Background ==
While the architect William Chambers was the driving force behind creation of the new organisation, the portrait painter Joshua Reynolds was elected as the first President of the Royal Academy. With the backing of George III, the academy sought to establish itself as the leading of fine art institution in the country. The first exhibition of contemporary art had only been held in 1760. The following year the Society of Artists of Great Britain staged the Exhibition of 1761 at Spring Gardens, featuring many figures who would subsequently form the Royal Academy. The Society held annual shows at Spring Gardens for the rest of the decade. Following the Exhibition of 1768, growing disagreements about the direction of the Society led to a split among the membership.

== Exhibition ==
The newly founded Academy hired the auction rooms formerly belonging to Christopher Cock in Pall Mall close to St James's Palace. The size of the room limited the number of works on display. Of the 136 exhibited 79 were by Royal Academicians and 57 by other contributors.

Entry (with the exhibition catalogue included) cost sixpence and 14,000 attended. The works on display included three portraits by Joshua Reynolds, seven portraits by Francis Cotes and three portraits and a landscape by the Bath-based painter Thomas Gainsborough. There were forty eight landscapes on display compared to forty portraits. The American artist Benjamin West, who two decades later would become the second President of Royal Academy, submitted the history paintings The Departure of Regulus and Venus Lamenting the Death of Adonis. Gainsborough exhibited portraits of Lady Molyneux and Lord Rivers.

It was followed by the Exhibition of 1770, also held at Pall Mall. The academy would later settle at a more permanent home at Somerset House for the Exhibition of 1780.

== Society of Artists of Great Britain ==
Despite the loss of leading artists to the newly founded Royal Academy, the Society of Artists continued with their annual exhibition held at Spring Gardens in Charing Cross. The exhibition lasted from 1 May to 2 June 1769. Although the Society continued to stage regular exhibitions, it was increasingly eclipsed by the Royal Academy shows. Despite moving to new headquarters in the Strand for its Exhibition of 1773, defections by major artists made it increasingly vulnerable and it ceased holding regular shows.

== Gallery ==
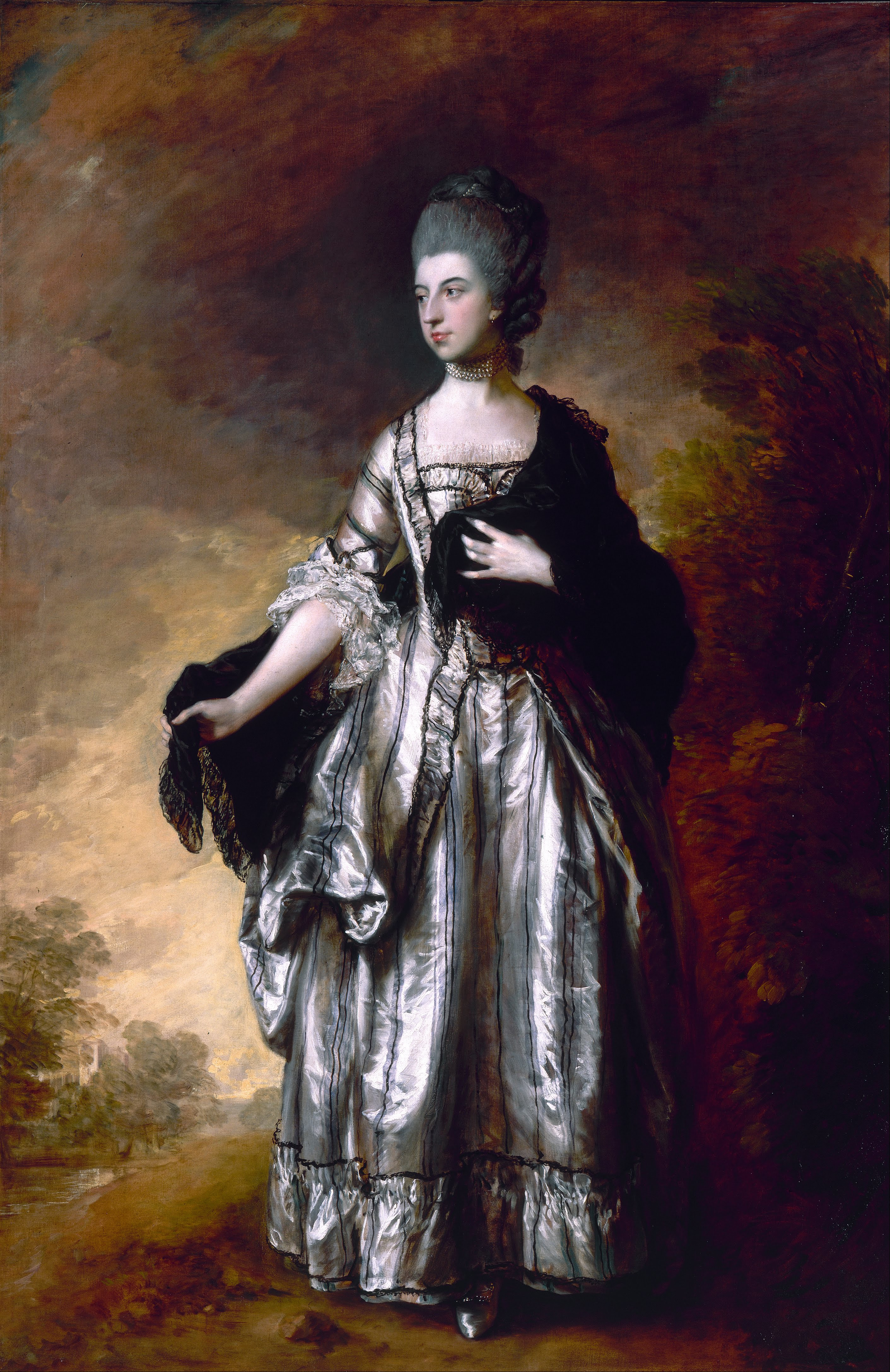
Portrait of Lady Molyneux by Thomas Gainsborough

Lord Rivers by Thomas Gainsborough

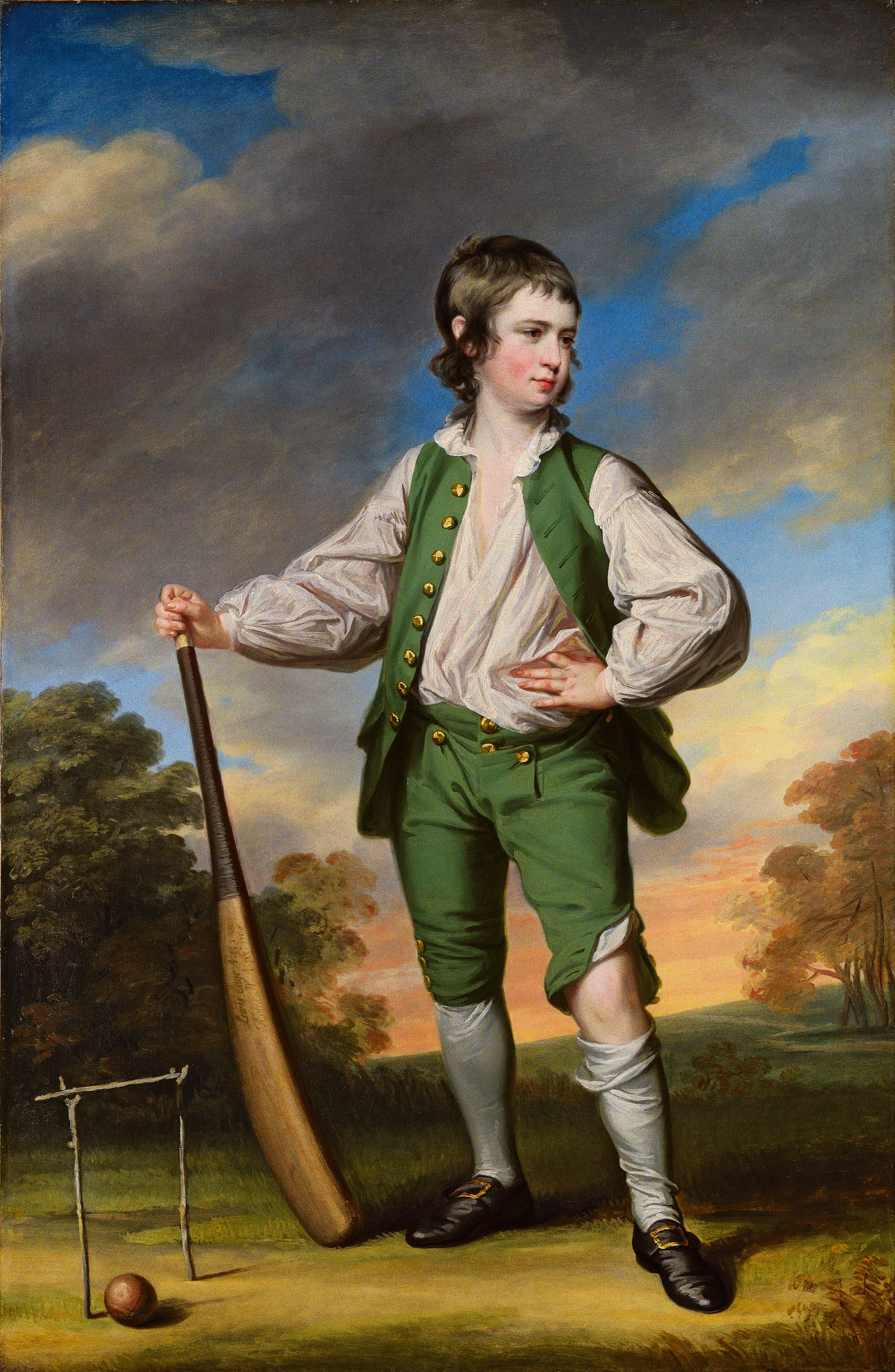
The Young Cricketer by Francis Cotes

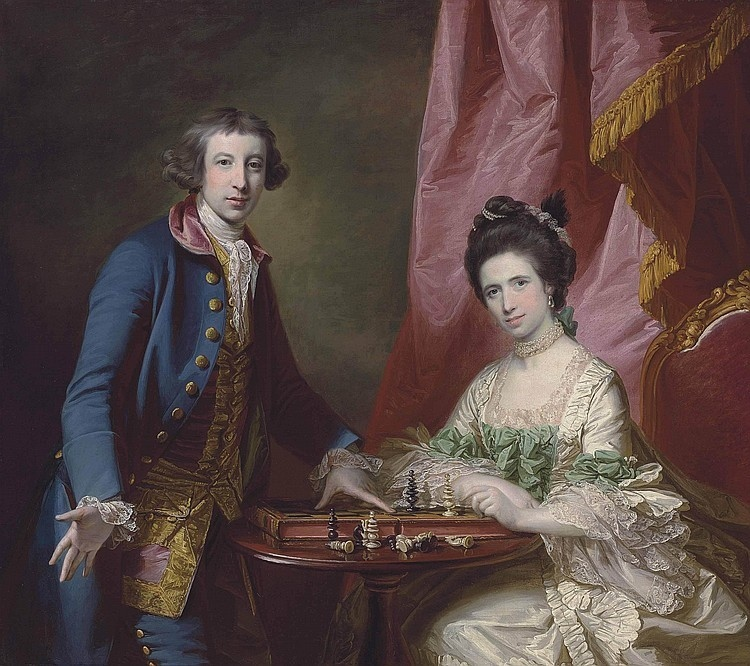
The Chess Players by Francis Cotes

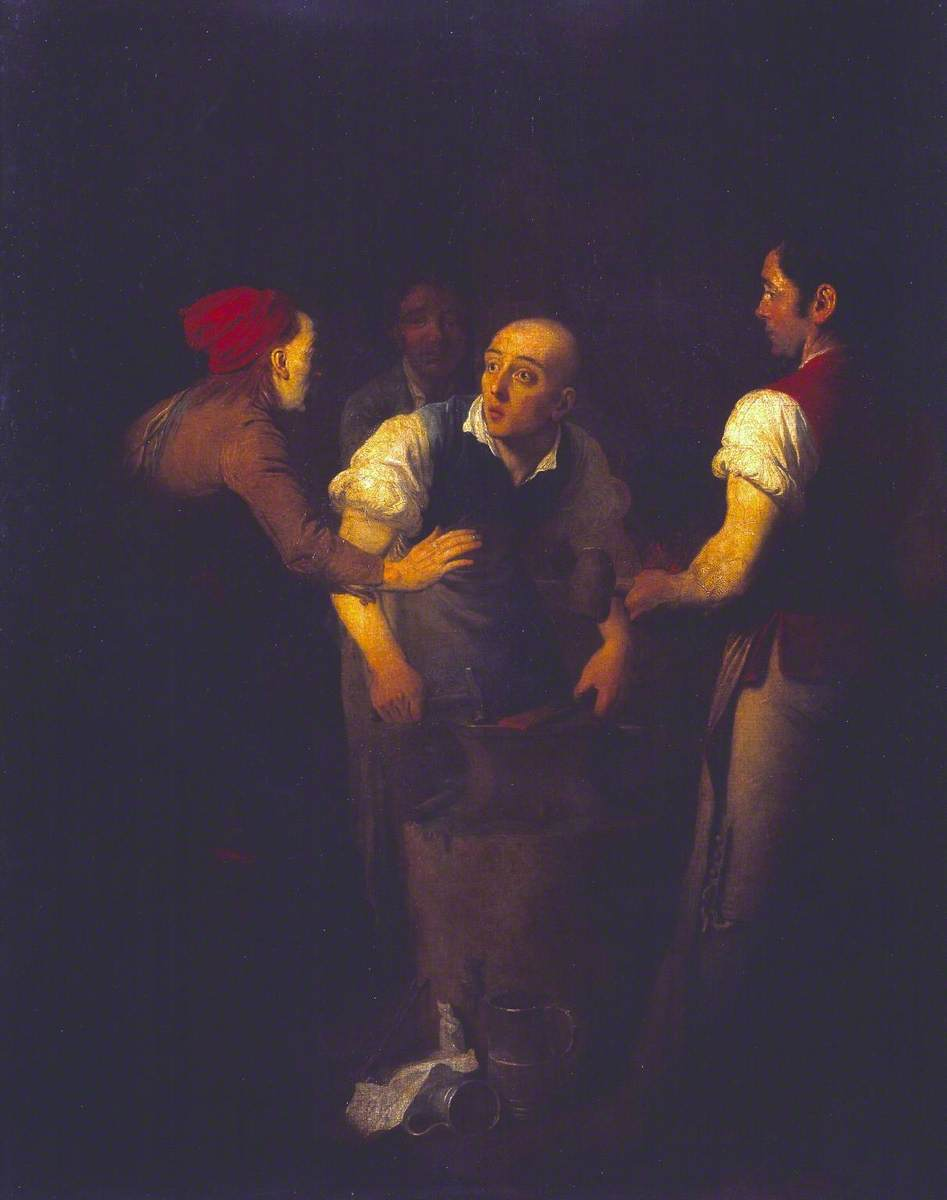
The Gossiping Blacksmith by Edward Penny

Venus Lamenting the Death of Adonis by Benjamin West

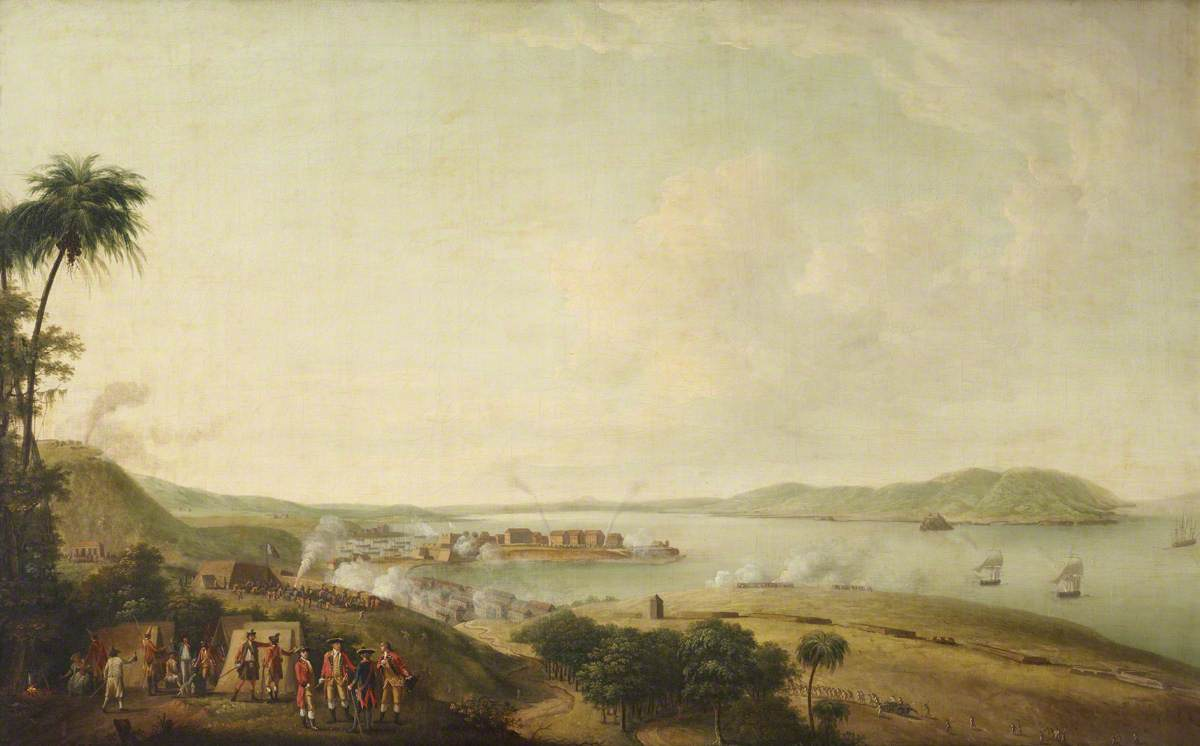
British Attack on the Citadel of Martinique by Dominic Serres

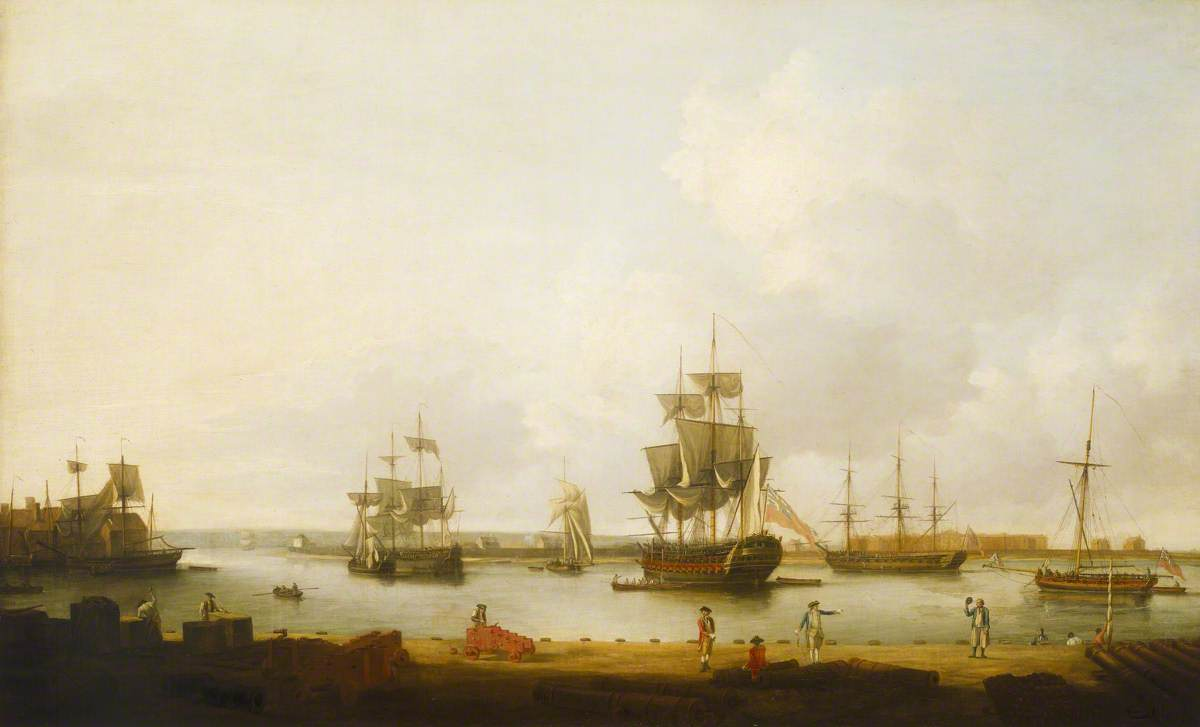
Ships off the Gun Wharf at Portsmouth by Dominic Serres

Westminster Bridge and the Thames Procession of King Christian VII of Denmark by Elias Martin

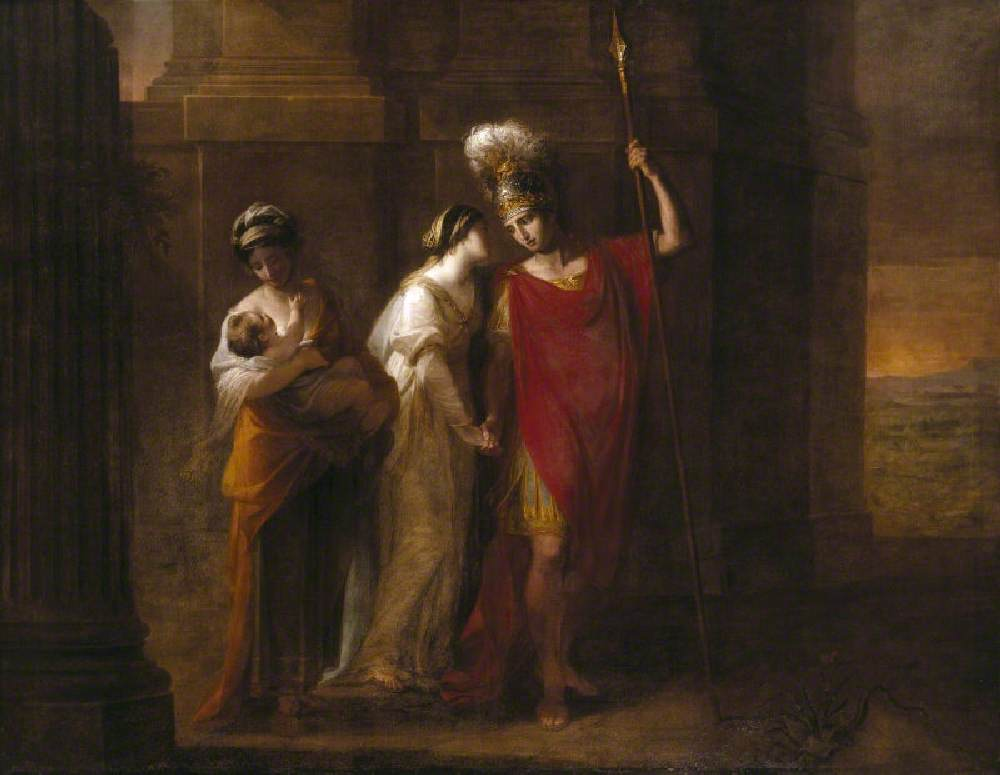
Hector Taking Leave of Andromache by Angelica Kauffmann

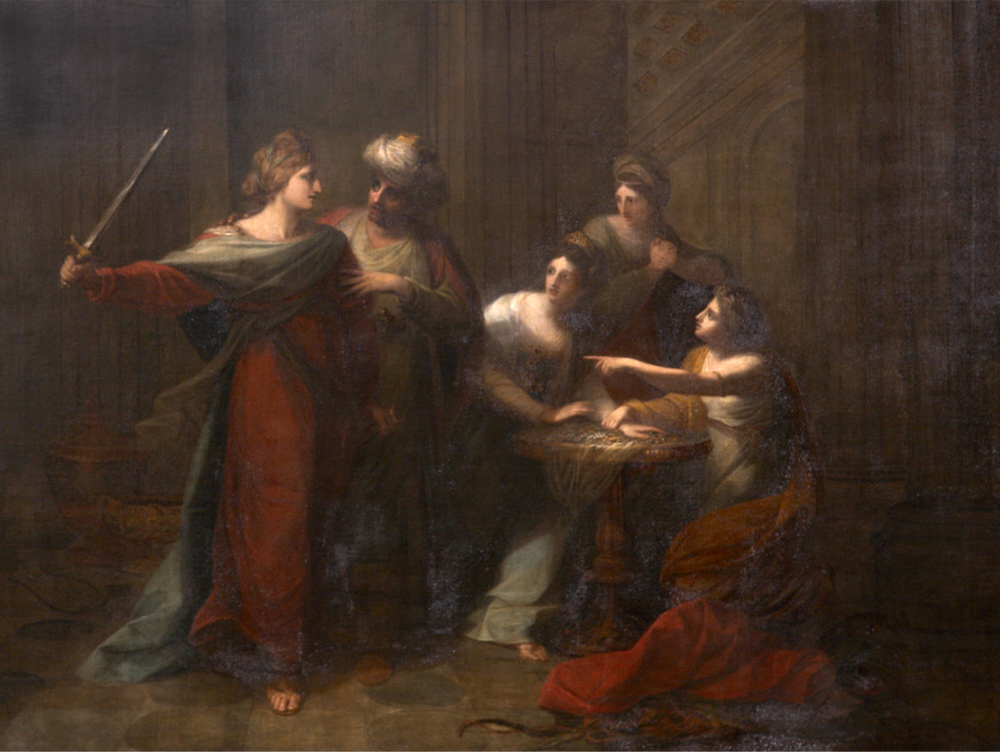
Ulysses discovers Achilles by Angelica Kauffmann

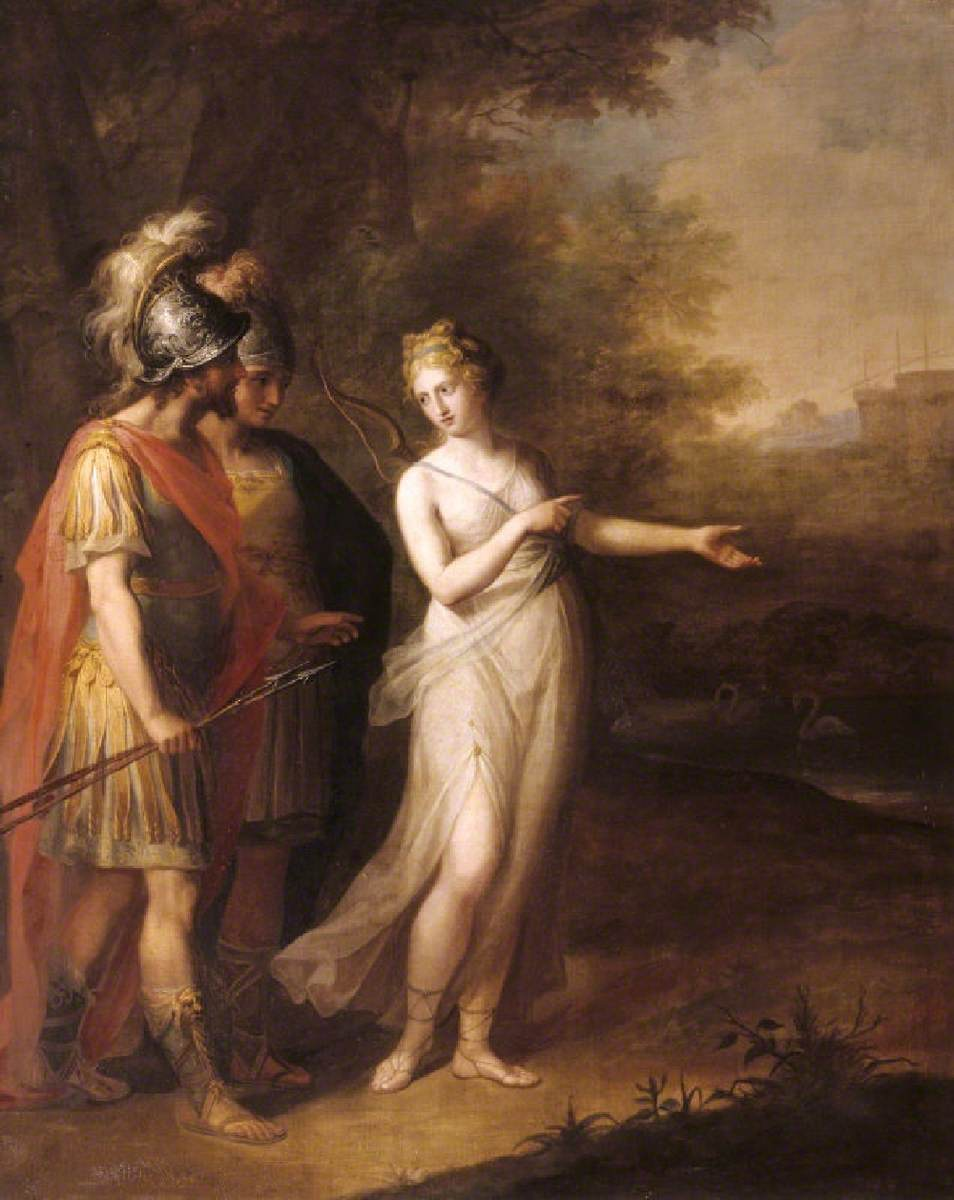
Venus Directing Aeneas and Achates to Carthage by Angelica Kauffmann

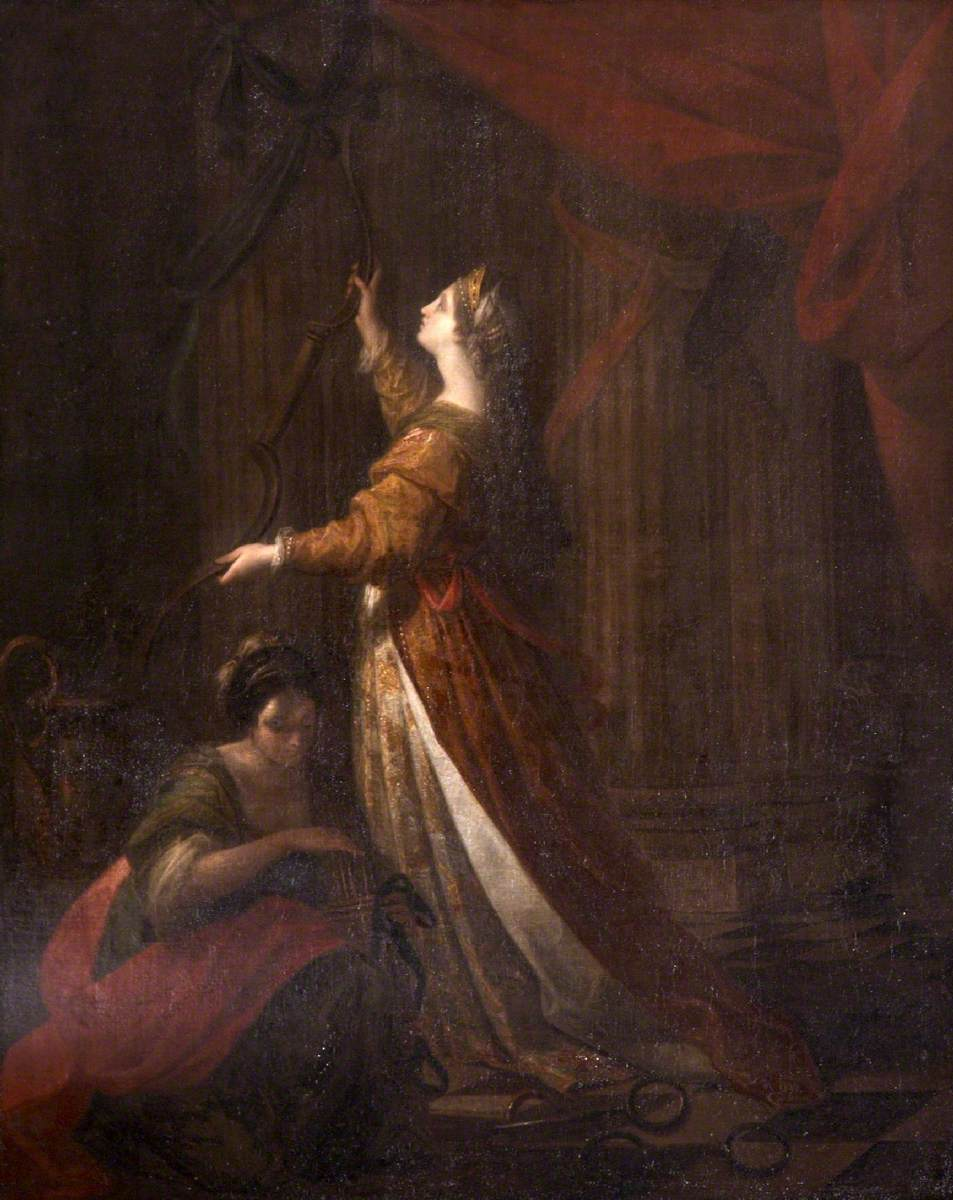
Penelope Taking Down the Bow of Ulysses by Angelica Kauffmann

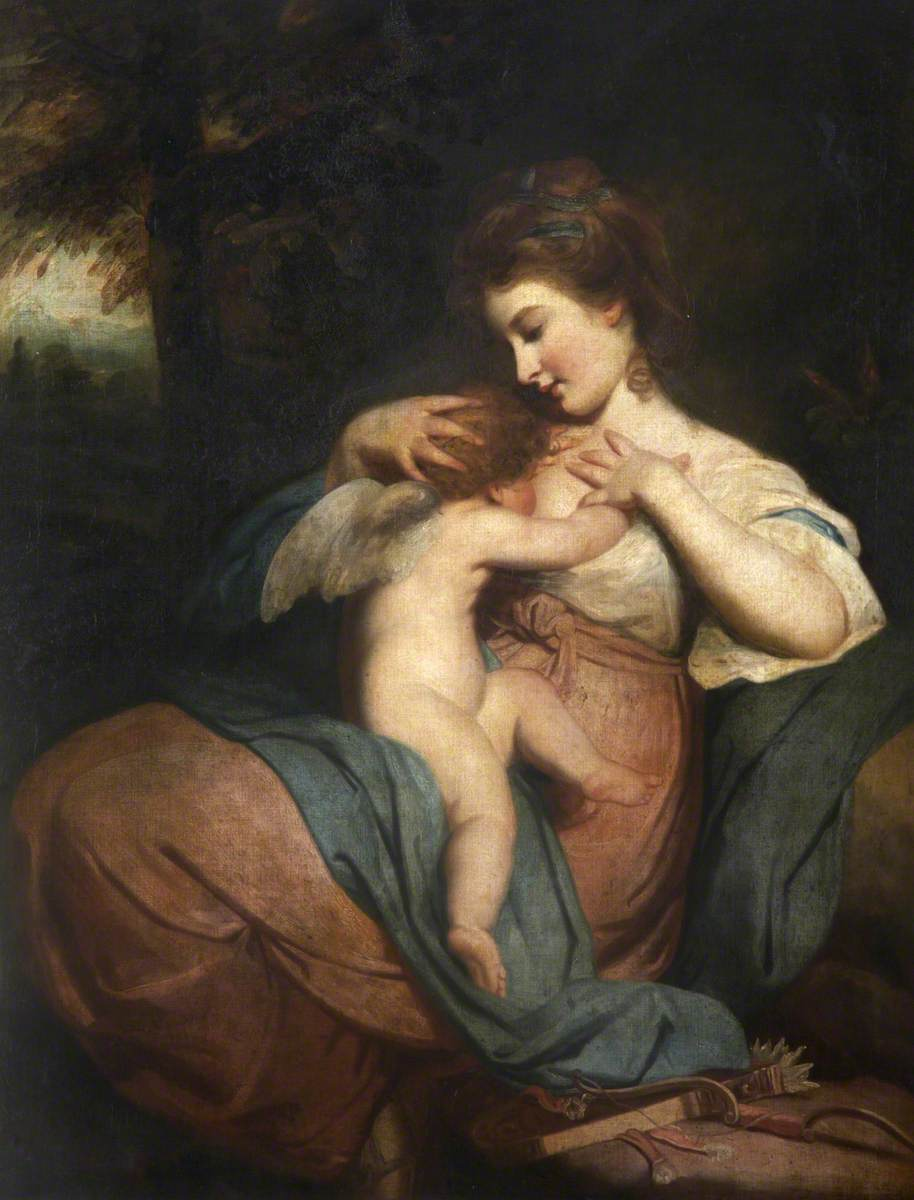
Hope Nursing Love by Joshua Reynolds

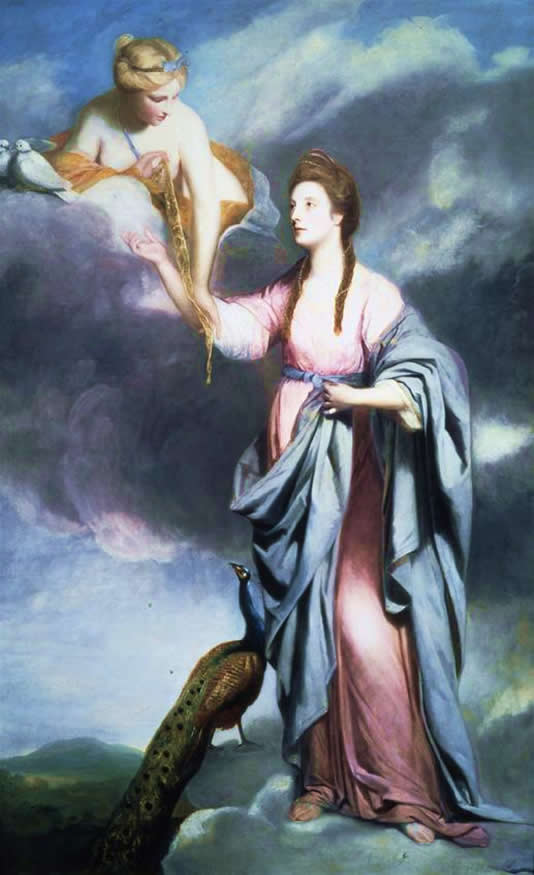
Juno Receiving the Cestus from Venus by Joshua Reynolds

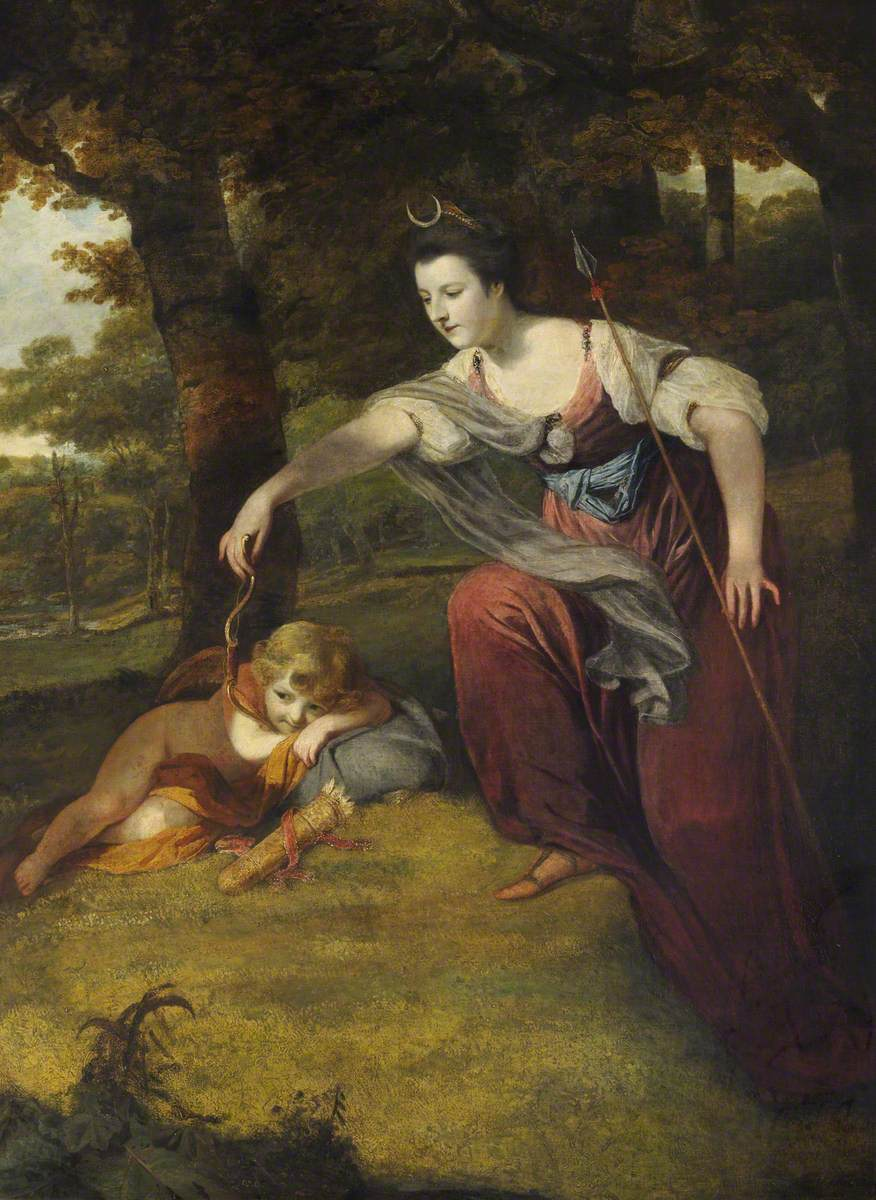
The Duchess of Manchester as Diana by Joshua Reynolds

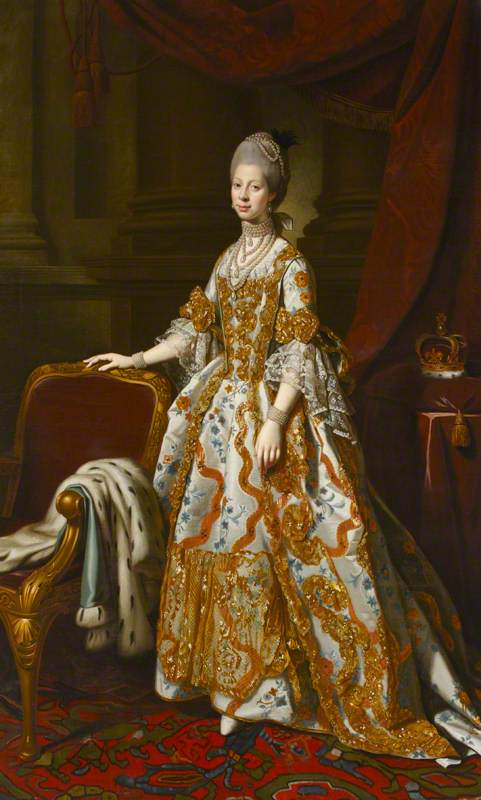
Portrait of Queen Charlotte by Nathaniel Dance

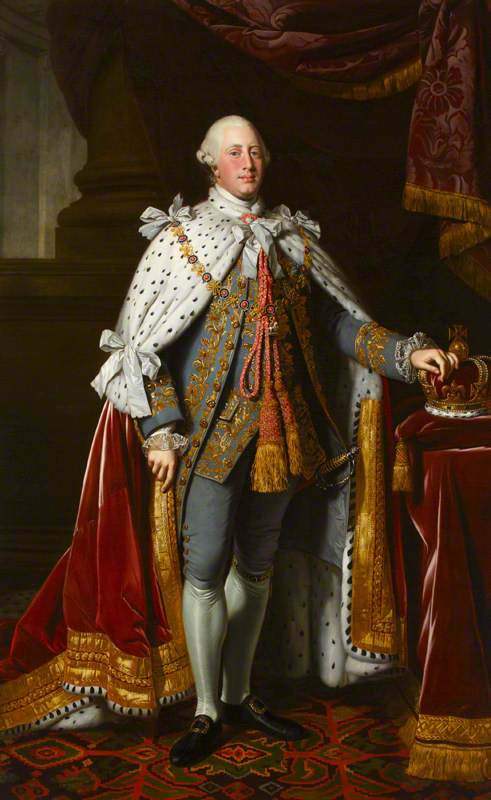
Portrait of George III by Nathaniel Dance

== See also ==
- Salon of 1769, held at the Louvre in Paris

== Bibliography ==
- Hamilton, James. Gainsborough: A Portrait. Hachette UK, 2017.
- Hargreaves, Matthew. Candidates for Fame: The Society of Artists of Great Britain, 1760–1791. Paul Mellon Centre for Studies in British Art, 2005.
- Hoock, Holger. Empires of the Imagination: Politics, War, and the Arts in the British World, 1750–1850. Profile Books, 2010.
- McIntyre, Ian. Joshua Reynolds: The Life and Times of the First President of the Royal Academy. Penguin Books, 2004.
