= Portrait of George III =

George III of the United Kingdom (reigned 1760–1820) featured in a large number of portrait paintings including:

- Coronation Portrait of George III, a 1762 painting by Allan Ramsay
- Portrait of George III (Dance-Holland), a 1768 painting by Nathaniel Dance-Holland
- Portrait of George III (Zoffany), a 1771 painting by Johann Zoffany
- Portrait of George III, a 1779 painting by Joshua Reynolds
- Portrait of George III (West), a 1779 painting by Benjamin West
- Portrait of George III (Gainsborough), a 1781 painting by Thomas Gainsborough
- Portrait of George III (Lawrence, 1792), a 1792 portrait by Thomas Lawrence
- Portrait of George III (Beechey), an 1800 painting by William Beechey
- Portrait of George III (Lawrence, 1809), an 1809 portrait by Thomas Lawrence
