= The Young Cricketer =

Painting by Francis Cotes

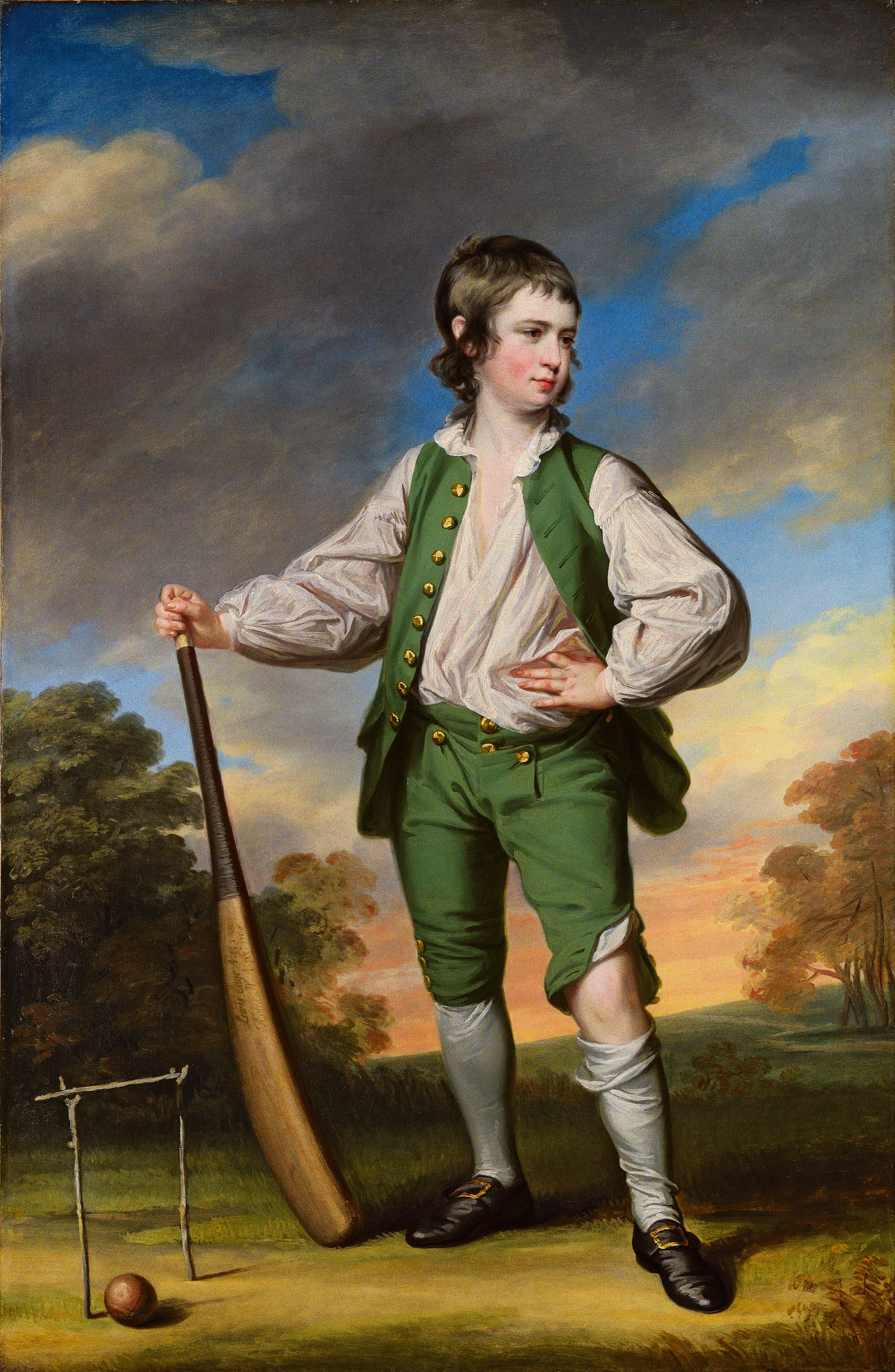
- Artist: Francis Cotes
- Year: 1768
- Type: Oil on canvas, portrait painting
- Dimensions: 170.7 cm × 111.7 cm (67.2 in × 44.0 in)
- Location: Private collection

The Young Cricketer is a 1768 portrait painting by the British artist Francis Cotes. It depicts Lewis Cage, a boy from Milgate House near Maidstone in Kent. He is shown holding a cricket bat, and standing in front of a wicket which at the time consisted of only two stumps. The heroic pose of the composition is formed by the use of the bat. The painting was displayed at the Royal Academy Exhibition of 1769, the inaugural Summer Exhibition of the Royal Academy held in Pall Mall.

== Bibliography ==
- Allen, Julia. Swimming with Dr Johnson and Mrs Thrale: Sport, Health and Exercise in eighteenth-century England. James Clarke & Company, 2012.
- Von Mallinckrodt, Rebekka. A Cultural History of Sport in the Age of Enlightenment. Bloomsbury Publishing, 2022.
- Wright, Amina & Postle, Martin. Pictures of Innocence: Portraits of Children from Hogarth to Lawrence. Holburne Museum of Art, 2005.
