= Samuel Cotes =

British painter

Samuel Cotes (1734–1818) was a younger brother of Francis Cotes, R.A. He was a successful painter of miniature portraits and also worked in crayons. He died in Chelsea in 1818.

== Life ==
He was third son of Robert Cotes, mayor of Galway, who settled in London, became a doctor and married Elizabeth, daughter of Francis Lynn, chief secretary to the Royal African Company. He was brought up by his father for the medical profession, but was encouraged by his brother Francis Cotes's success as a painter to take up art; he received instruction from Francis.

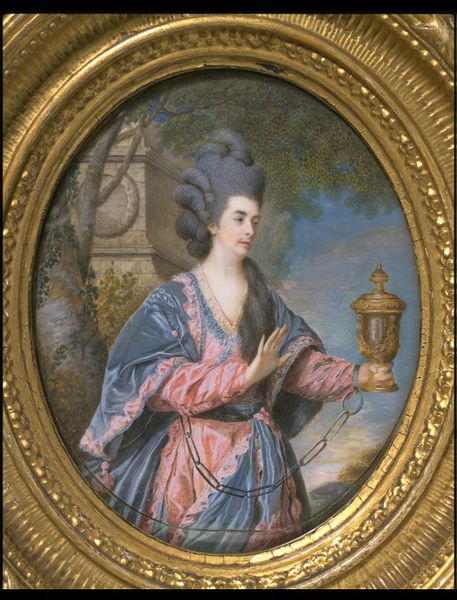
Mary Anne Yates as Electra in Orestes by Voltaire, 1769 portrait by Samuel Cotes

Cotes retired from active life some years before his death. He resided in Paradise Row, Chelsea, London, where he died 7 March 1818 in his eighty-fifth year.

== Works ==
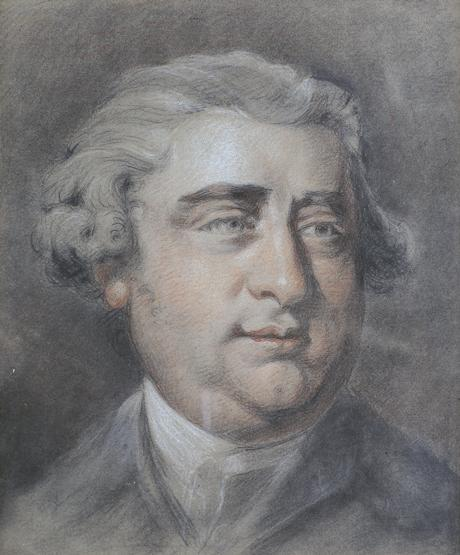
Charles James Fox, pastel portrait by Samuel Cotes

Cotes became known as a portrait painter; his crayon portraits were also admired. He painted in miniature both on enamel and on ivory, and exhibited from 1760 to 1789 at the exhibitions of the Incorporated Society of Artists, of which he was a fellow, and at the Royal Academy. During this time he resided at 25 Percy Street, Rathbone Place. After his brother's death he painted a large miniature of him from memory. A portrait by him of Mary Anne Yates as Electra was engraved in mezzotint by Philip Dawe, and a portrait of Thomas Pownall by Richard Earlom.

== Family ==
Cotes was twice married, first to Mary Creswick in 1768, and secondly in 1780 to Sarah Shepherd, an artist, who died 27 September 1814, aged 76.
