= Ben Hulse (footballer) =

English footballer (1875 – 1950)

Personal information
- Full name: Benjamin Daniel Hulse
- Date of birth: 3 August 1875
- Place of birth: Liverpool, England
- Date of death: 30 May 1950 (aged 74)
- Place of death: Liverpool, England
- Height: 5 ft 11 in (1.80 m)
- Position: Forward

Senior career*
Years	Team	Apps	(Gls)
- Liverpool South End
189?–1897	Rock Ferry		
1897–1900	Blackburn Rovers	85	(22)
1900–1901	New Brighton Tower	31	(14)
1901–1904	Millwall Athletic	60	(35)
1904–1905	Brighton & Hove Albion	26	(7)
- * Club domestic league appearances and goals

Benjamin Daniel Hulse (3 August 1875 – 30 May 1950) was an English professional footballer who played as a forward in the Football League for Blackburn Rovers and New Brighton Tower, and in the Southern League for Millwall Athletic and Brighton & Hove Albion.

== Life and career ==
Hulse was born in Liverpool in 1875. He began his football career with Liverpool South End, and was a member of the Rock Ferry team that beat Everton to win the 1897 Liverpool Senior Cup. He signed for New Brighton Tower in April 1897, but a commission ruled that the club had not observed correct procedure in affiliating to the Football Association and declared void all registration forms signed thus far. Hulse joined Blackburn Rovers instead, and soon became a first-team regular, scoring 22 goals from 85 First Division appearances. In 1900, he successfully signed for New Brighton Tower, by then playing in the Second Division. He scored 14 goals from 31 league matches before the club withdrew from the Football League at the end of the season and then disbanded.

Hulse moved south to join Millwall Athletic, where he was converted from inside forward to centre forward and scored 35 goals from 60 Southern League matches. He captained the team as they reached the semifinal of the 1902–03 FA Cup. In 1904, he moved to another Southern League club, Brighton & Hove Albion where, although he was less prolific, "his ability to orchestrate the forward line was much admired". Nevertheless, he left the club at the end of the season.

The 1911 Census shows him working as a dock labourer in his native Liverpool and father of a large family. He died in the city in 1950 at the age of 74.
