= Edward Hulse (physician, 1682–1759) =

English physician

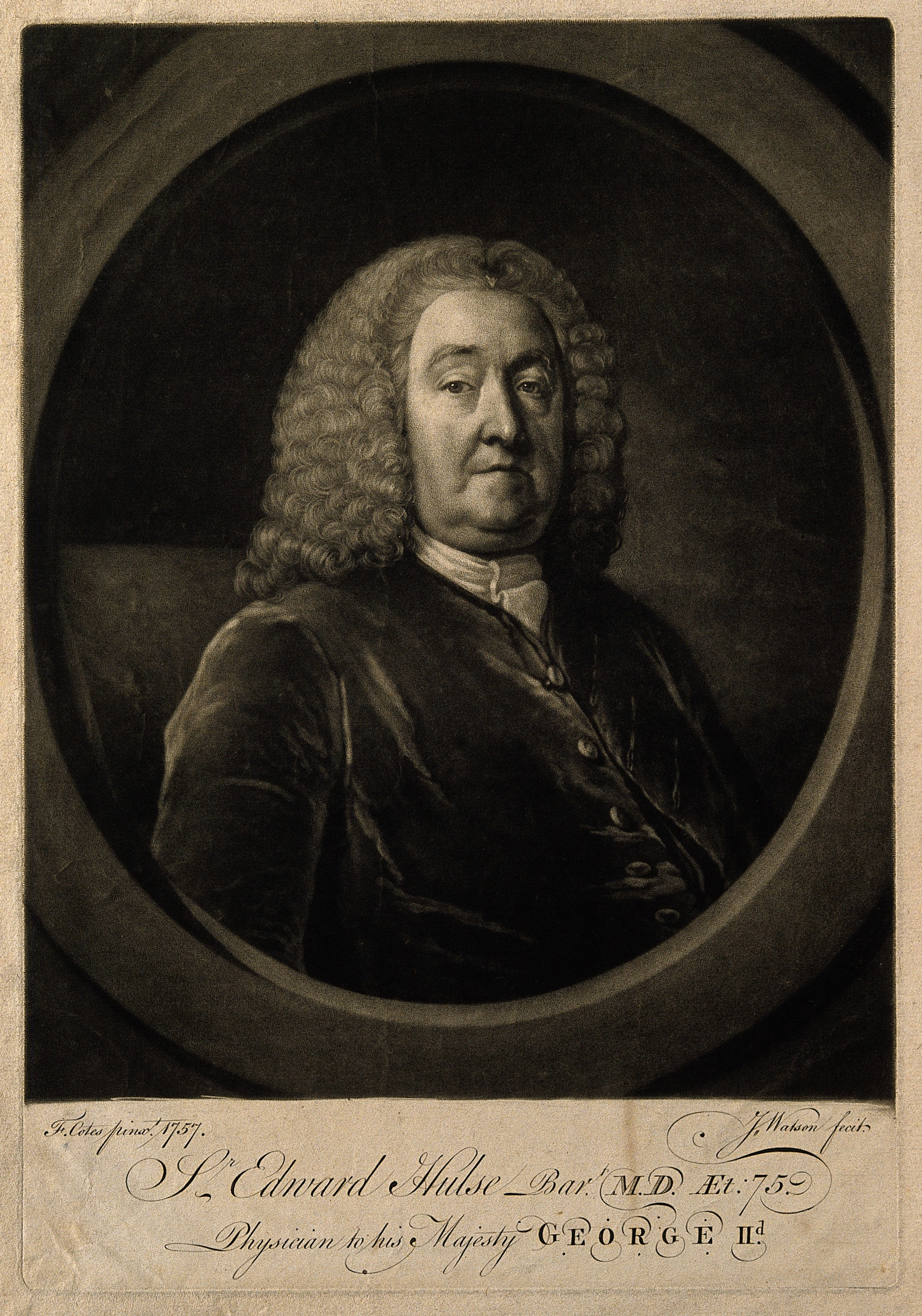
- Born: 1682
- Died: 10 April 1759 (aged 76–77)
- Occupation: Physician

Sir Edward Hulse, 1st Baronet (1682 – 10 April 1759) was an English physician.

== Biography ==
Hulse was the eldest son of Dr. Edward Hulse. He graduated M.B. at Emmanuel College, Cambridge, in 1704, and M.D. in 1717. He joined the College of Physicians of London in 1717, became censor for a first time in 1720, and councillor in 1750, 1751, and 1753. He was in leading physician's practice in London along with John Freind, Richard Mead, Hans Sloane, and others. He was one of Freind's sureties before the latter was committed to the Tower. He is described as one of the `whig doctors,' and is said to have differed so seriously with Freind over the case of Lord Townshend that he withdrew, declaring that his lordship must die if Freind had his way (Townshend recovered, having declared he would live or die by the hands of Freind). He was first physician to George II, and was made a baronet on 7 February 1738–9. In 1745 he was attacked with others in several pamphlets, on their treatment of the Earl of Orford. He retired from practice some years before his death, and lived at his house on Dartford Heath, Kent. In 1738 he purchased the estate of Breamore, Hampshire, which is held by his successors in the title. In his old age he was possessed by the idea that he would die of want, a fear which his attendants overcame by putting guineas regularly into the pocket where he used to deposit his fees. He died on 10 April 1759, and was buried in the churchyard of Wilmington, Kent. A portrait by Francis Cotes has been engraved by James Watson. He married, in 1713, Elizabeth, daughter of Sir Richard Levett, knt., who had been lord mayor in 1700, and had issue by her. His son Edward, who succeeded to the title, was father of Sir Samuel Hulse. Another son, Richard, inherited his house and manor at Dartford.

== See also ==
- Hulse baronets
