= Edward Hulse (physician, 1631–1711) =

English physician

- Born: 1631
- Died: 3 December 1711 (aged 79–80)
- Occupation: Physician

Edward Hulse (1631 – 3 December 1711) was an English physician.

== Biography ==
Hulse was a native of Cheshire. He graduated M.A. at Emmanuel College, Cambridge, in 1660, and was ejected from the college for nonconformity soon after. His name appears in the Leyden register of students of medicine, under date 4 July 1668. He graduated M.D. there, became physician to the court of the Prince of Orange, and was incorporated M.D. at Oxford on 20 December 1670, on the nomination of that prince. He joined the College of Physicians in 1675, became a fellow 1677, censor 1682, and subsequently Harveian orator 1704, and treasurer 1704 to 1709. He died on 3 December 1711, in his eighty-first year, and is described in the annals of the college as 'a person of great skill in the practice of physick.' He married Dorothy, daughter of Thomas Westrow of Twickenham, by whom he was father of Sir Edward Hulse.
