= Portrait of George III (Dance-Holland) =

1768–1769 painting by Nathaniel Dance-Holland

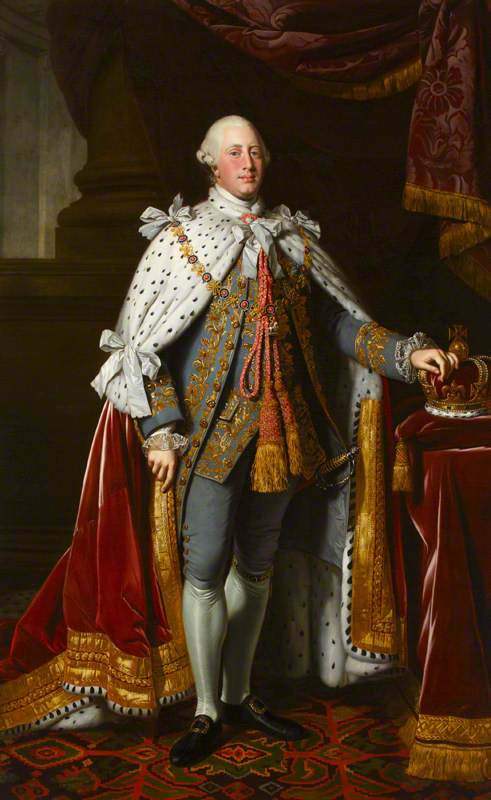
- Artist: Nathaniel Dance-Holland
- Year: 1768–1769
- Type: Oil on canvas, portrait painting
- Dimensions: 233.9 cm × 142.2 cm (92.1 in × 56.0 in)
- Location: Uppark House, Sussex

Portrait of George III is an oil on canvas portrait painting by the English artist Nathaniel Dance-Holland, from 1768–1769. It depicts the British monarch George III.

Dance-Holland spent more than a decade in Italy before returning to Britain where he became a noted portraitist. He was a founder member of the Royal Academy and chose to exhibit this and a portrait of Queen Charlotte at the inaugural Royal Academy Exhibition of 1769 at Pall Mall. Both paintings are now in the collection of the National Trust at Uppark House in West Sussex.

== Bibliography ==
- Gott, Ted & Benson, Laurie. Painting and Sculpture Before 1800 in the International Collections of the National Gallery of Victoria. National Gallery of Victoria, 2003.
- Ingamells, John. National Portrait Gallery Mid-Georgian Portraits, 1760–1790. National Portrait Gallery, 2004.
- Palmer, Allison Lee. Historical Dictionary of Neoclassical Art and Architecture. Scarecrow Press, 2011.
