= Bobby Hulse =

English footballer

Personal information
- Full name: Robert James Hulse
- Date of birth: 5 January 1957
- Place of birth: Gateshead, England
- Positions: Defender; midfielder

Senior career*
Years	Team	Apps	(Gls)
1980–198?	Gateshead		
–	Stade Quimpérois		
1983	Darlington	4	(0)
–	Newcastle Blue Star		
198?–1987	Gateshead		
1987–1989	Barrow		
1989–1990	Gateshead		
- * Club domestic league appearances and goals

Robert James Hulse (born 5 January 1957) is an English former footballer who played as a defender or midfielder in the Football League for Darlington and in France for Stade Quimpérois. He spent several spells with Gateshead; he was a member of their 1985–86 Northern Premier League title-winning squad, and made more than 200 appearances spread over a ten-year period. He also played non-league football for Newcastle Blue Star and for Barrow, with whom he won the Northern Premier League in 1988–89.

Hulse was sent off for persistent fouling on his Darlington debut, on 24 September 1983 at home to Fourth Division leaders York City. York's goalkeeper, Roger Jones, had earlier been sent off for a professional foul. The game finished goalless.

After leaving football he worked in demolition before moving into property development.
