= Sir Edward Hulse, 6th Baronet =

British politician

Hulse in 1895.

Sir Edward Henry Hulse, 6th Baronet DL (25 Aug 1859 – 29 May 1903) was a British Conservative Party politician.

== Biography ==
Educated at Eton College and Brasenose College, Oxford, he was elected as Member of Parliament (MP) for Salisbury at the 1886 general election, and was returned to the House of Commons at the next two general elections. He resigned his seat on 16 January 1897 by becoming Steward of the Manor of Northstead.

In 1888 he married Edith Maud Levy-Lawson, daughter of Sir Edward Levy-Lawson. They had one son, Edward Hamilton Westrow Hulse, born in 1889, who was to succeed to the baronetcy.

Hulse held a commission in the Royal Wiltshire Yeomanry. With the outbreak of the Second Boer War in late 1899, the Imperial Yeomanry was formed from contingents of the Yeomanry regiments. Hulse volunteered for active service in South Africa and was commissioned as a lieutenant in the 56th (Buckinghamshire) Company, attached to the 15th Battalion, Imperial Yeomanry on 3 March 1900. The company left for South Africa in the middle of March 1900. Promoted to captain on 4 September 1900, he was mentioned in dispatches for his service. His brother, Major Charles Hulse was killed in action during the war, and Sir Edward was himself severely injured in 1901.

In late May 1902 he was appointed assistant press censor on the military staff. Following the end of the war only days later, he remained in South Africa, and was appointed chief press censor in the new colonies in early July that year. He resigned his commission in the yeomanry in December 1902, and was granted the honorary rank of captain in the army. In his final months he was in financial difficulty, having lost considerable sums of money on the stock exchange and at horse races. He was also suffering considerable pain from his injuries. His body was discovered in his bedroom in Johannesburg on the morning of 30 May 1903 after he had committed suicide with his revolver.

Coat of arms of Sir Edward Hulse, 6th Baronet
Crest A buck’s head couped Proper attired Or between the attires a sun of the last and charged on the neck with two bezants and a plate. Escutcheon Per fess Argent and Ermine three piles one issuing from the chief between the others reversed Sable. Motto Esse Quam Videri

Parliament of the United Kingdom
Preceded by William Greenfell	Member of Parliament for Salisbury; 1886 – 1897	Succeeded by Augustus Henry Eden Allhusen
Baronetage of Great Britain
Preceded by Edward Hulse	Baronet (of Lincoln's Inn Fields); 1899–1903	Succeeded by Edward Hamilton Westrow Hulse
