= Sir Edward Hulse, 7th Baronet =

British Army officer and baronet

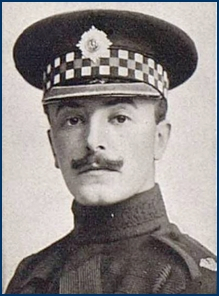
Sir Edward Hulse, Scots Guards

Sir Edward Hamilton Westrow Hulse, 7th Baronet (31 August 1889 – 12 March 1915) was an officer in the British Army during the First World War. He had his letters published posthumously detailing his account of the fighting on the Western Front, describing events such as the Christmas Truce.

== Biography ==
Born in Westminster to Lady Hulse, only daughter of Sir Edward Levy-Lawson, and Sir Edward Henry Hulse, 6th Baronet and a Conservative politician. He succeeded to the title of baronet in 1903, after his father committed suicide. He was educated at Eton College and Balliol College, Oxford, completing his degree reading History in 1912.

After a period of training with the Coldstream Guards, he was given a commission in the 1st Battalion Scots Guards on 8 March 1913. In August 1914, after the outbreak of World War I in July, he went to Mons with the 1st Battalion. In November he was transferred to the 2nd Battalion.

Sir Edward Hulse was killed in action at Neuve-Chapelle on 12 March 1915. According to a short biography written by Perceval Landon as an introduction to Hulse's collection of letters, his commanding officer, Major Paynter, fell severely wounded and Hulse was killed crossing open ground after trying to help him.

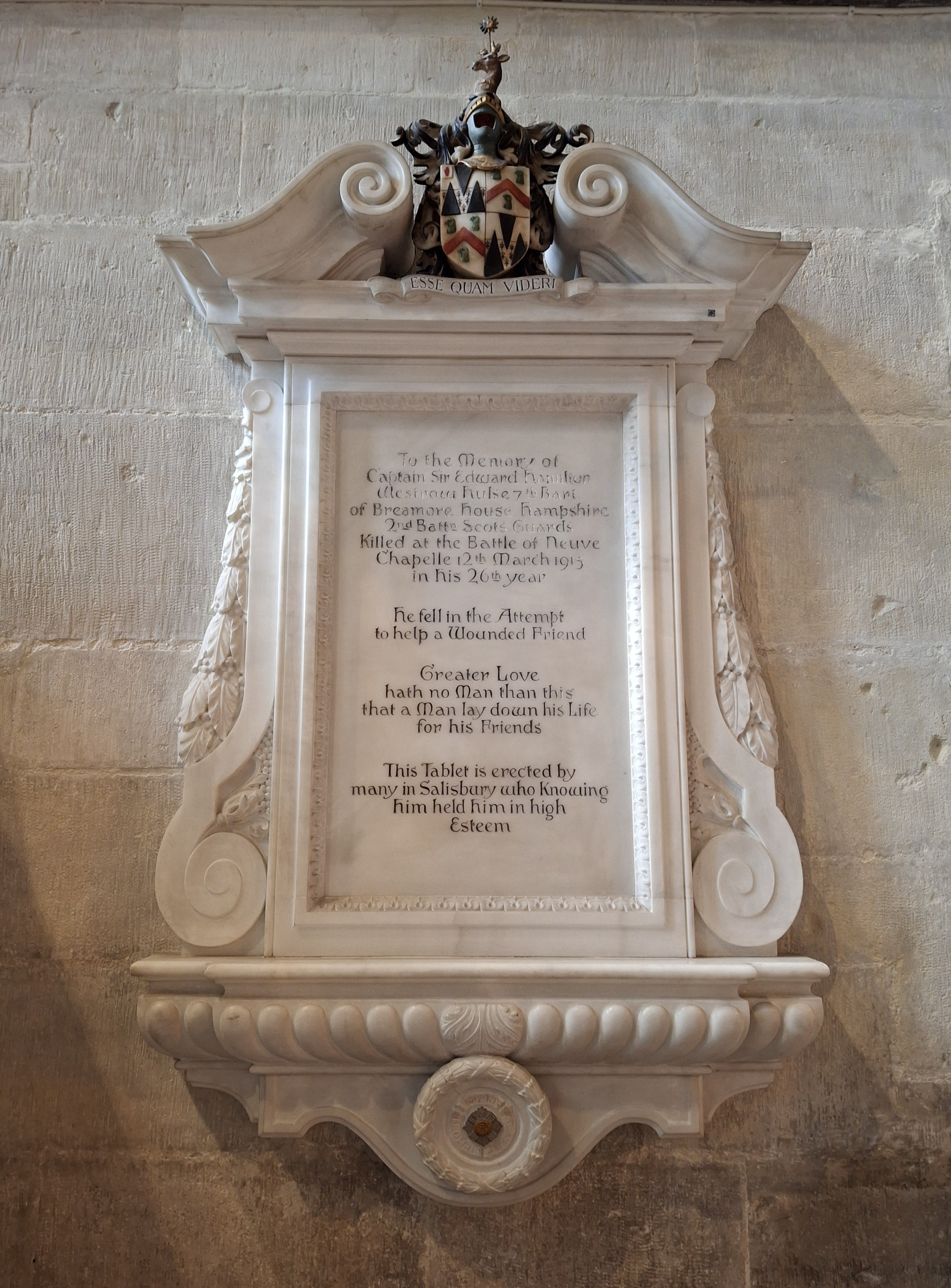
Memorial in Salisbury Cathedral to Sir Edward Hamilton Westrow Hulse

Hulse's name can be found on the Salisbury war memorial, as well as there being a plaque recording his death placed in Salisbury Cathedral, dedicated by the Bishop of Salisbury, on 11 March 1916.

Coat of arms of Sir Edward Hulse, 7th Baronet
| Crest A buck’s head couped Proper attired Or between the attires a sun of the last and charged on the neck with two bezants and a plate. Escutcheon Per fess Argent and Ermine three piles one issuing from the chief between the others reversed Sable. Motto Esse Quam Videri |

Baronetage of Great Britain
| Preceded by Edward Hulse | Baronet (of Lincoln's Inn Fields); 1903–1915 | Succeeded by Hamilton Hulse |
