= Hulse baronets =

Title in the Baronetage of Great Britain

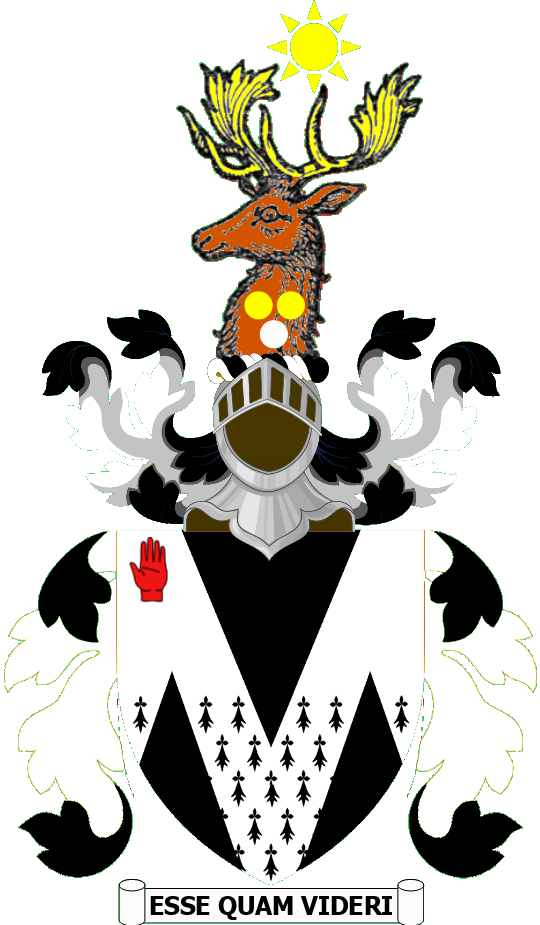
- Crest: A buck’s head couped Proper attired Or between the attires a sun of the last and charged on the neck with two bezants and a plate.
- Shield: Per fess Argent and Ermine three piles one issuing from the chief between the others reversed Sable.
- Motto: Esse Quam Videri

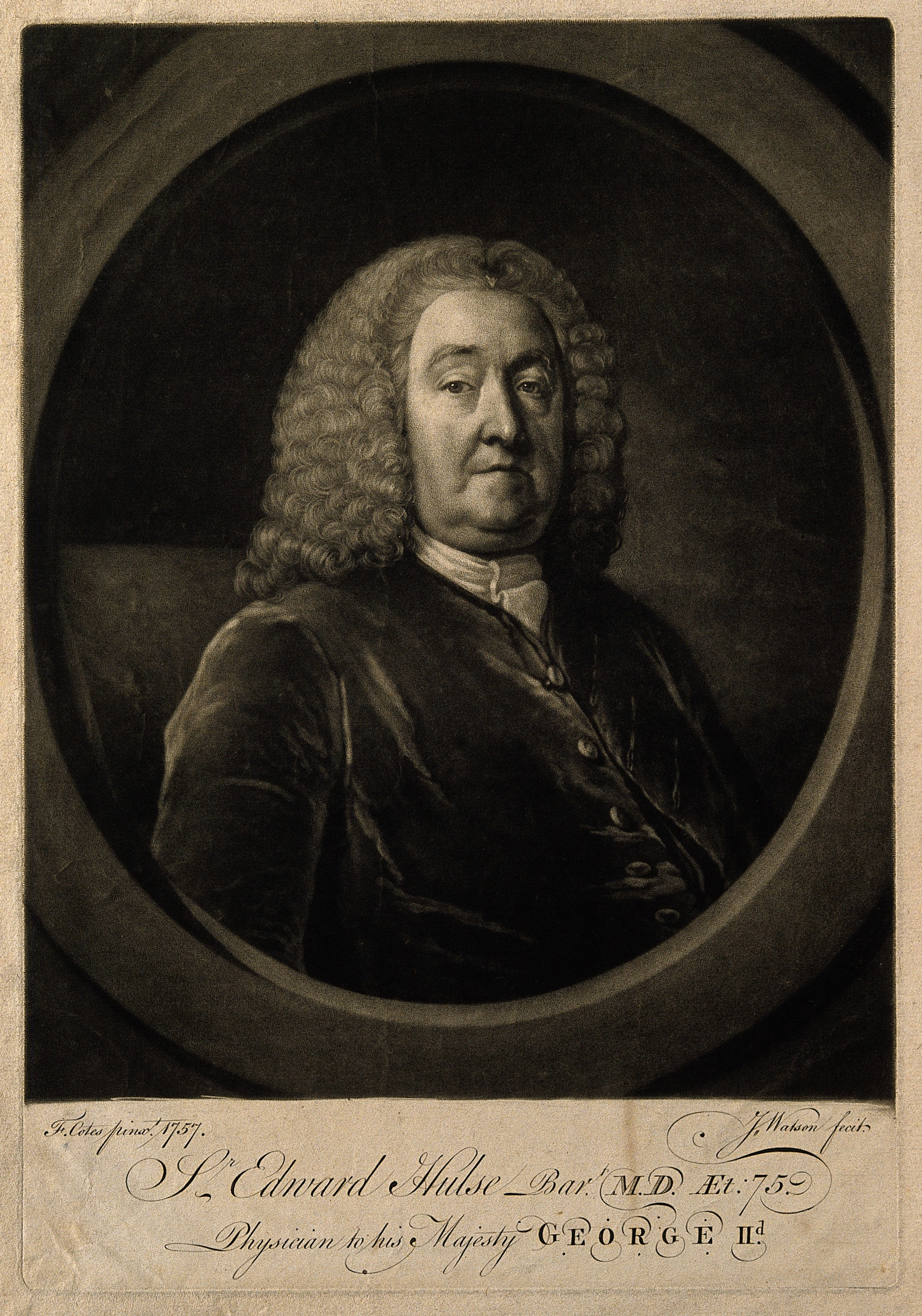
Sir Edward Hulse, 1st Baronet

The Hulse baronetcy, of Lincoln's Inn Fields in the County of Middlesex, is a title in the Baronetage of Great Britain. It was created on 7 February 1739 for Edward Hulse, first physician to George II.

The 3rd Baronet was High Sheriff of Hampshire in 1802. The 6th Baronet represented Salisbury in the House of Commons. The 10th Baronet was High Sheriff of Hampshire in 1978 and Deputy Lieutenant of the county in 1989. The Hulse family has common origin with the Holles Earls of Clare.

The family seat at Breamore House, Breamore, Hampshire was purchased by the 1st Baronet.

== Hulse baronets, of Lincoln's Inn Fields (1739) ==
- Sir Edward Hulse, 1st Baronet (c. 1682–1759)
- Sir Edward Hulse, 2nd Baronet (1714–1800)
- Sir Edward Hulse, 3rd Baronet (1744–1816)
- Sir Charles Hulse, 4th Baronet (1771–1854)
- Sir Edward Hulse, 5th Baronet (1809–1899)
- Sir Edward Henry Hulse, 6th Baronet (1859–1903)
- Sir Edward Hamilton Westrow Hulse, 7th Baronet (1880–1915)
- Sir Hamilton John Hulse, 8th Baronet (1864–1931)
- Sir (Hamilton) Westrow Hulse, 9th Baronet (1909–1996)
- Sir Edward Jeremy Westrow Hulse, 10th Baronet (1932–2022)
- Sir (Edward) Michael Westrow Hulse, 11th Baronet (born 1959)

The heir apparent is the current holder's son, Edward Westrow William Hulse (born 1993).

Baronetage of Great Britain
Preceded by Armytage baronets	Hulse baronets of Lincoln's Inn Fields; 7 February 1739	Succeeded by Drury baronets
