= Francis Cotes =

English painter (1726–1770)

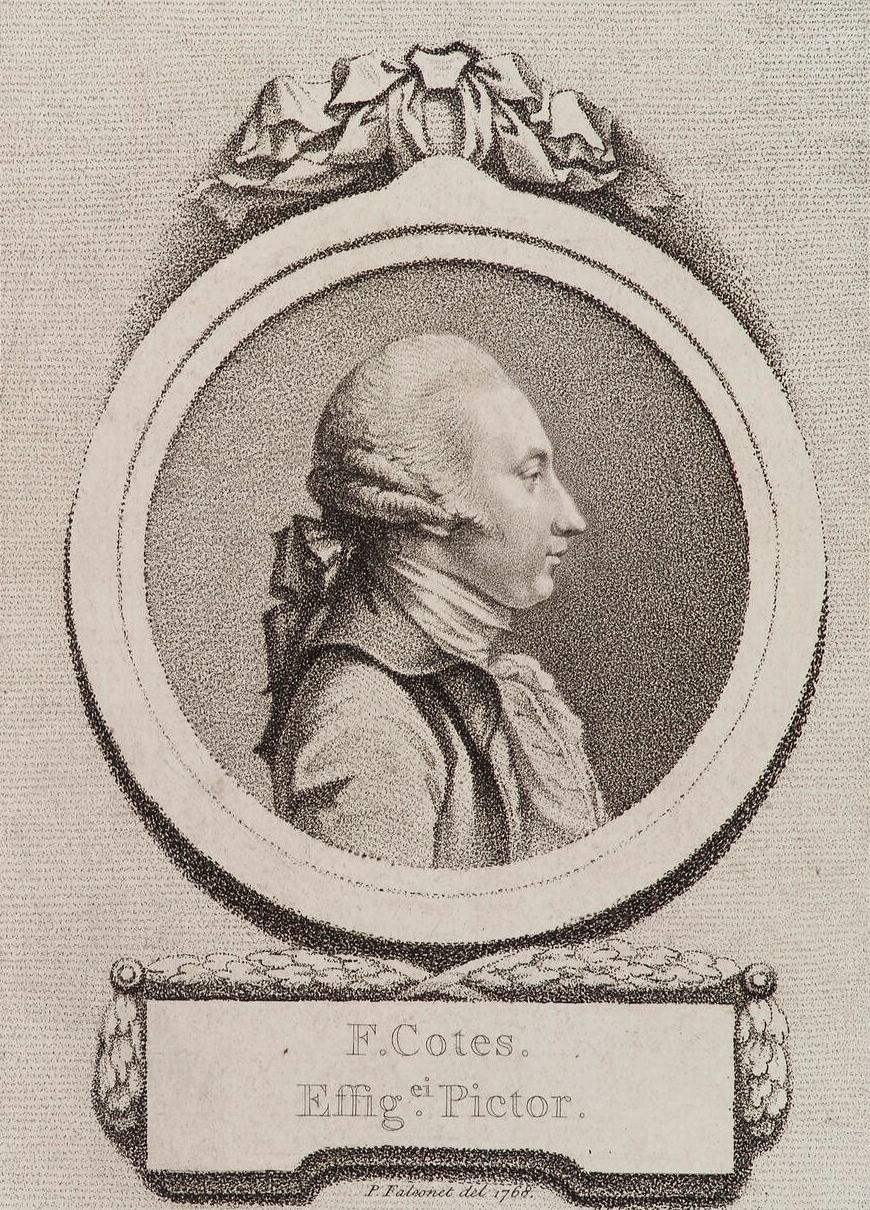
- Stipple engraving of Cotes after Pierre-Étienne Falconet
- Born: 20 May 1726; London, England
- Died: 16 July 1770 (aged 44); London, England

Francis Cotes RA (20 May 1726 – 16 July 1770) was an English painter who was one of the pioneers of English pastel painting and co-founded the Royal Academy in 1768.

== Life and work ==
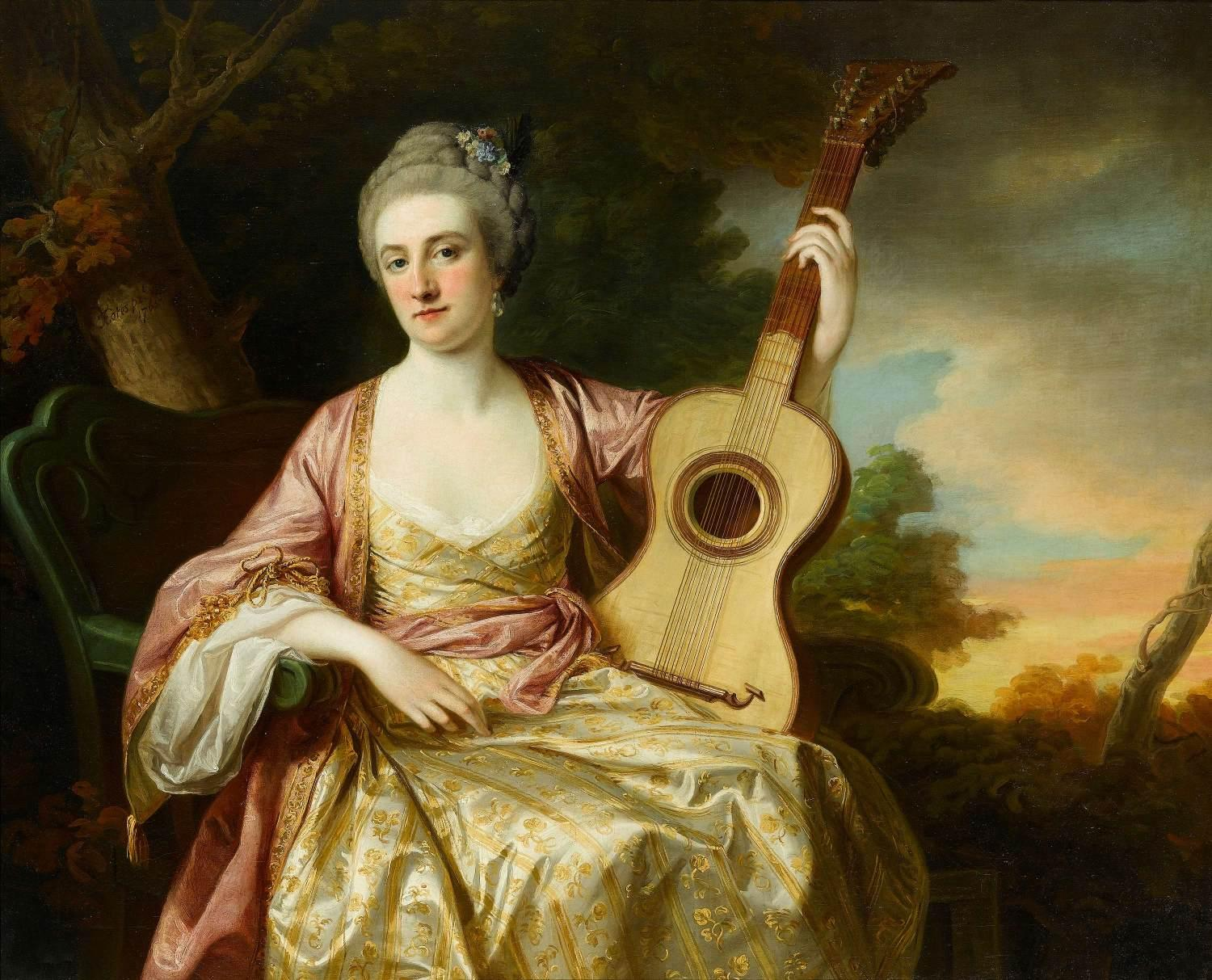
Francis Cotes R.A. Portrait of Maria Walpole, Countess Waldegrave, Later H.R.H. Duchess of Gloucester and Edinburgh (1736-1807), 1765, oil on canvas

He was born in London, the eldest son of Robert Cotes, an apothecary (Francis's younger brother Samuel Cotes (1734–1818) also became an artist, specialising in miniatures). Cotes trained with portrait painter George Knapton (1698–1778) before setting up his own business in his father's business premises in London's Cork Street—learning, incidentally, much about chemistry to inform his making of pastels.

An admirer of the pastel drawings of Rosalba Carriera, Cotes concentrated on works in pastel and crayon (some of which became well known as engravings). After pushing crayon to its limit as a medium—although he was never to abandon it entirely—Cotes turned to oil painting as a means of developing his style in larger-scale works. In his most successful paintings, particularly those of the early 1760s, the oil paint is thinly applied, in imitation of his pastel technique, and imbued with charm, inviting comparisons with Allan Ramsay and Sir Joshua Reynolds. They have clarity and warmth and possess a remarkable attention to costume. In 1763, he bought a large house (later occupied by George Romney) in Cavendish Square. He also painted The Young Cricketer. After 1746, the costumes in his pictures were mostly executed by the specialist drapery painter Peter Toms.

One of the most fashionable portrait painters of his day, Cotes helped found the Society of Artists of Great Britain and became its director in 1765. At the peak of his powers, Cotes was invited to become one of the first members of the Royal Academy, but died just two years later, aged 44, in Richmond.

He also taught pastel skills to John Russell, who described Cotes' techniques in his book The Elements of Painting with Crayon.

== Gallery ==
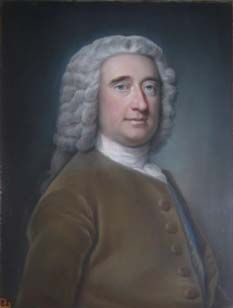
Francis Cotes R.A. Portrait of Stephen Fox-Strangways, 1st Earl of Ilchester

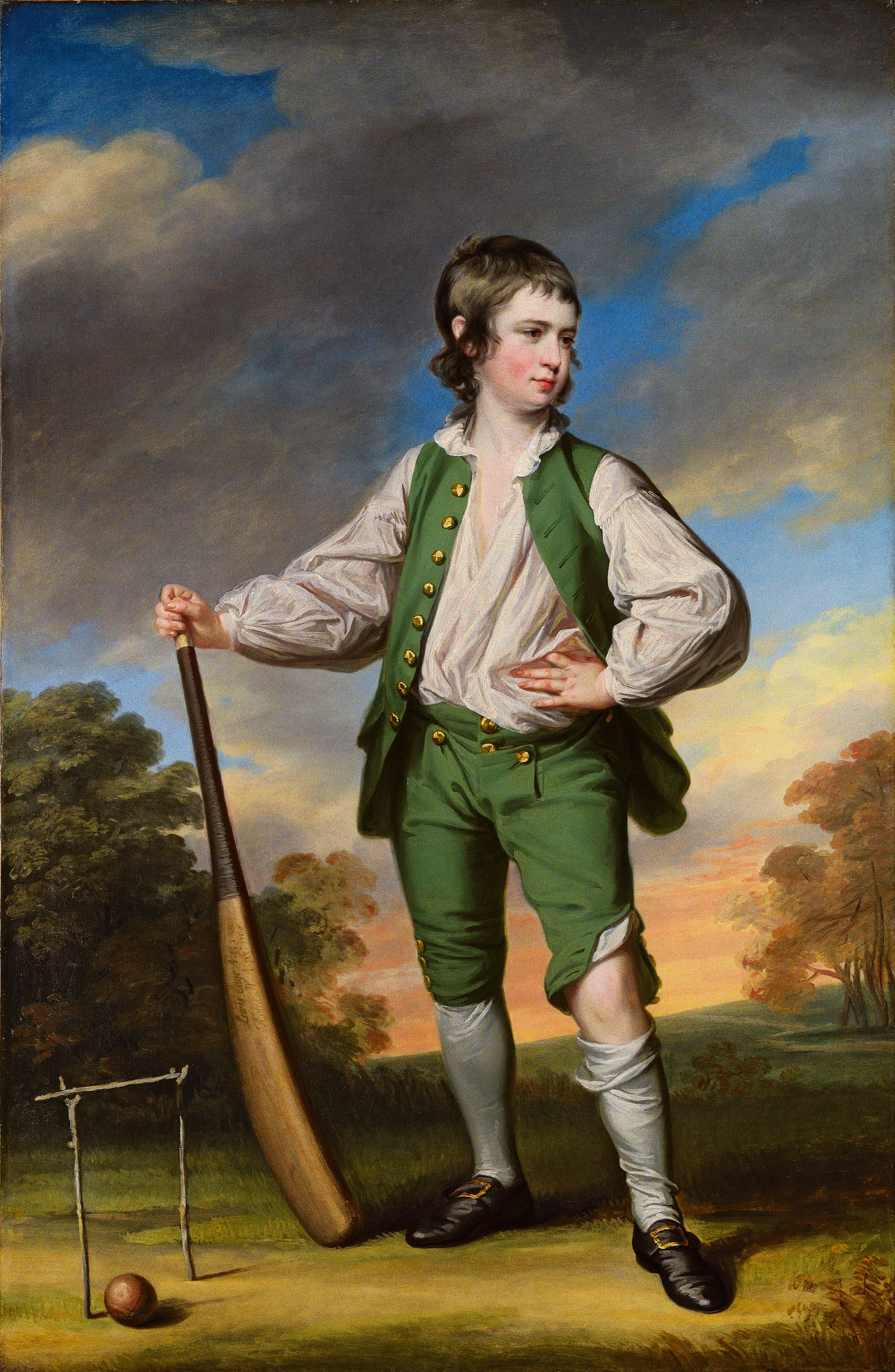
The Young Cricketer, 1768
