= Indid race =

Outdated racial category

The Indid race is an obsolete racial classification of human beings based on a now-disproven theory of biological race. In anthropological literature of the 19th and 20th centuries, the populations of the Indian subcontinent were classified as belonging to this race, which was categorized as belonging to the Mediterranean type of the greater Caucasoid race.

== Physiognomy ==
American anthropologist Carleton S. Coon described the Indid race as occupying the Indian subcontinent, beginning from the Khyber Pass. Coon wrote that "India is the easternmost outpost of the Caucasian racial region". Indologists, such as those of the All-India Oriental Conference of 1941, described the Indid type as having a standard set of features:

Indid: Consisting of the main body of the people of India: slim, graceful body, thin bones, medium height, long head, long face, brown skin, black wavy hair, protruding narrow forehead, triangular nose, weak chin.

The Royal Society of Letters at Lund likewise stated in 1946 that the Indid type possessed a narrow forehead and large eye sockets. John Montgomery Cooper, an American ethnologist and Roman Catholic priest, on 26 April 1945 in a hearing before the United States Senate "To Permit all people from India residing in the United States to be Naturalized" recorded:

The people of India are predominantly Caucasoid. Their features, hair texture, hairiness, the shape of the nose, mouth, and so on, are all distinctly Caucasoid. It is only in some of the far, out-of-the-way places of India, as in this country, that you find certain traces of other races.

German physical anthropologist Egon Freiherr von Eickstedt (1892–1965) proposed two subdivisions of the Indid race: the (1) North Indid type, which he stated was typified by peoples such as Rajputs from Rajasthan and Todas of the Nilgiri Mountains; and the (2) Gracile Indid type, which he stated was represented by peoples such as the Bengalis. The Romani people, being among the oldest members of the Indian diaspora, were classified as being of the Indid type.

The theory propounded by German comparative philologists during the 1840s and 1850s "maintained that the speakers of Indo-European languages in India, Persia, and Europe were of the same culture and race". This resulted in a distinction between the majority Indo-Aryan peoples of northern India and the less populous Dravidian peoples, located mostly in southern India with areas outlying in Baluchistan in the northwest and in the eastern corner of the Bihar Province. Notwithstanding, Dravidians came to be classified as belonging to the Caucasian race by 19th- and 20th-century anthropologists.

== See also ==
- Historical definitions of races in India
- Iranid race
