= Weninger =

Weninger is a German surname. Notable people with the surname include:

- Francis Xavier Weninger (1805–1888), Austrian Jesuit missionary and author
- Jeff Weninger (born 1970), American politician
- Josef Weninger (1886–1959), Austrian anthropologist
- Quinn Weninger (born 1962), Canadian-American economist
- Wenz Weninger, member of the German industrial metal band Megaherz

== See also ==
- Wenninger
- Weininger
