= Historical definitions of races in India =

Various attempts have been made, under the British Raj and since, to classify the population of India according to a racial typology. After independence, in pursuance of the government's policy to discourage distinctions between communities based on race, the 1951 Census of India did away with racial classifications. Today, the national Census of independent India does not recognise any racial groups in India.

Some scholars of the colonial epoch attempted to find a method to classify the various groups of India according to the predominant racial theories popular at that time in Europe. This scheme of racial classification was used by the British census of India, which was often integrated with caste system considerations.

== Great races ==
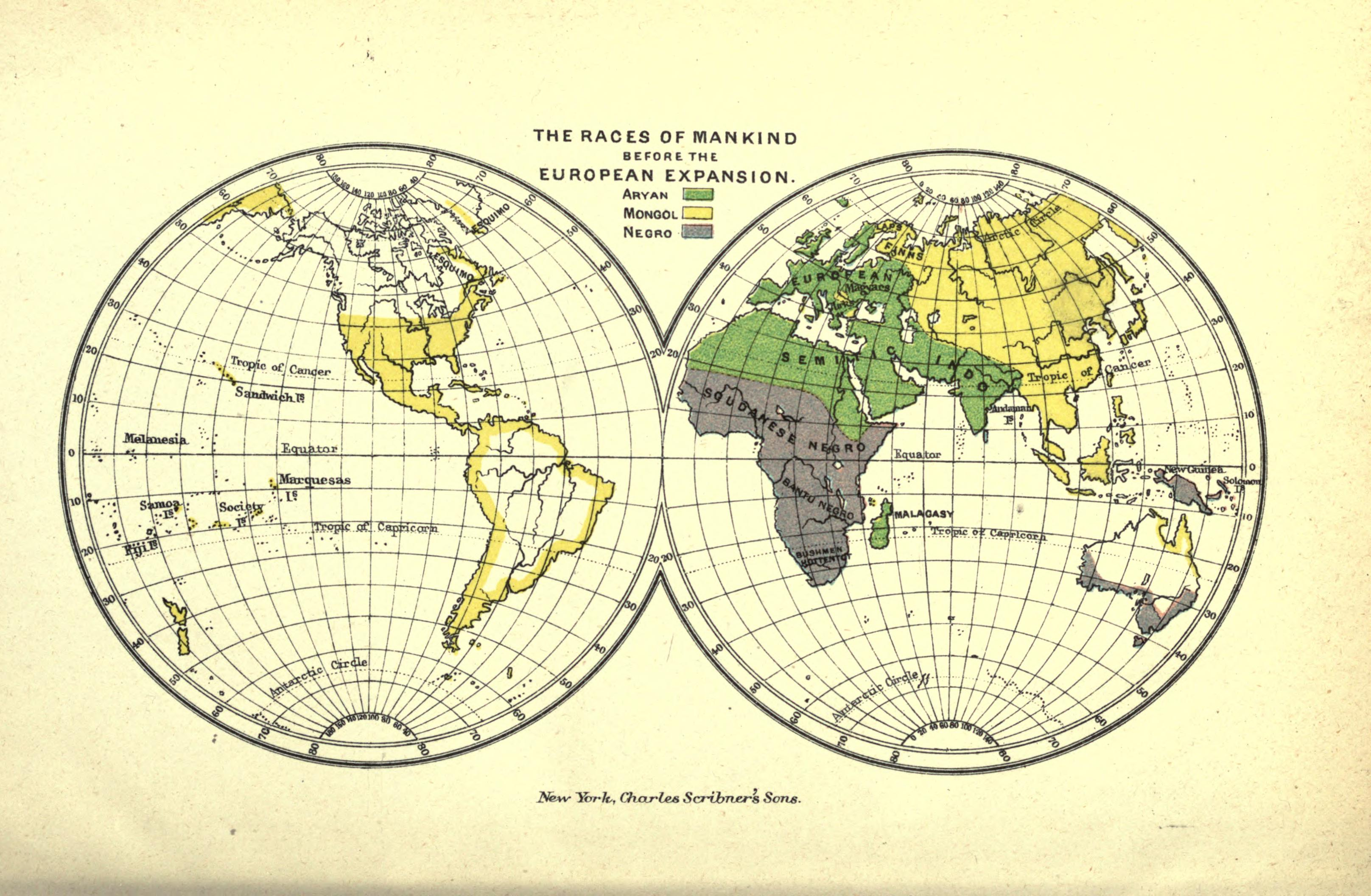
The Races of Mankind Before European Expansion, published by Charles Scribner's Sons in 1891, depicting world races, in the era in which scientific racism was prevalent

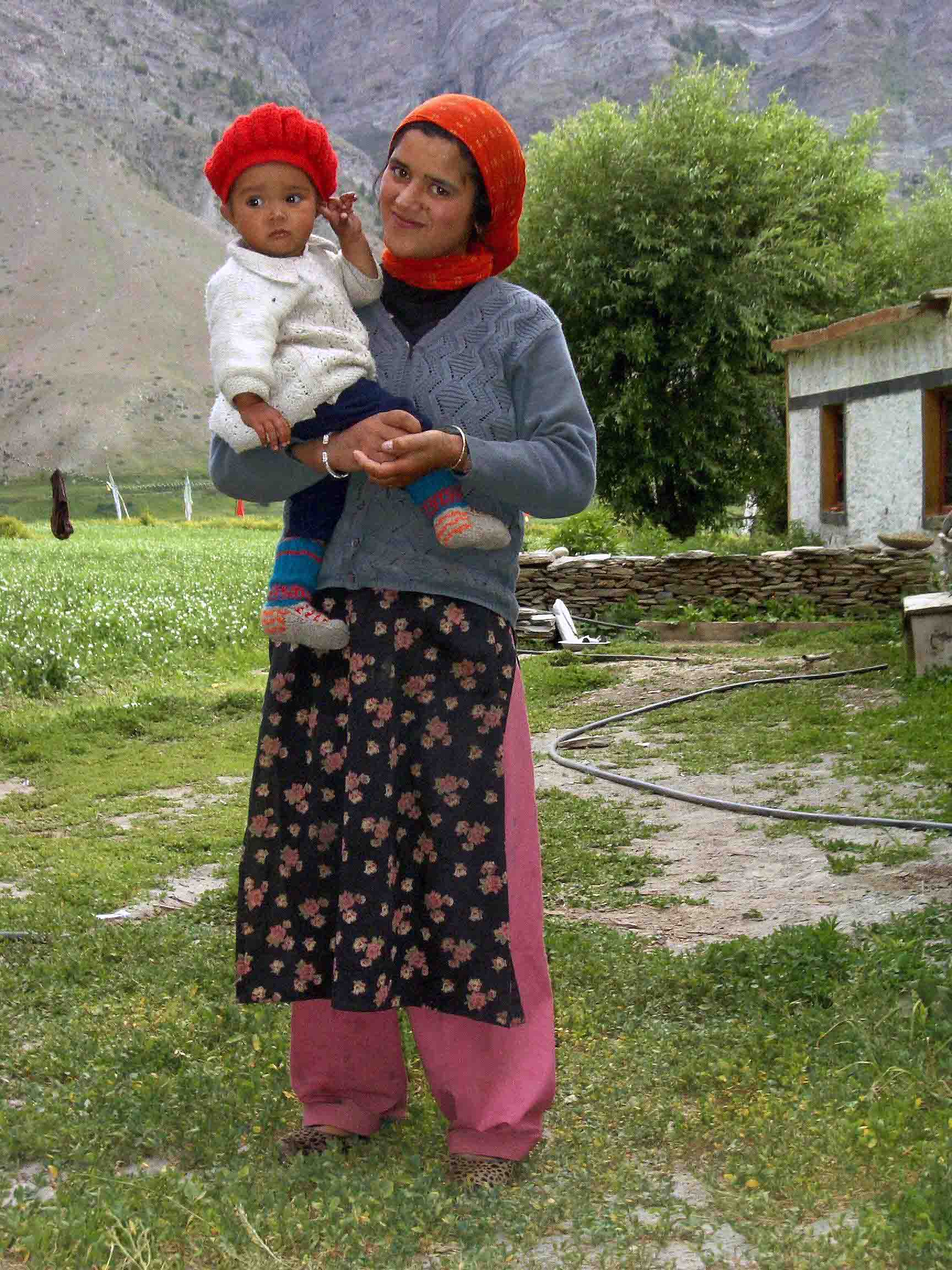
Mother and child in the Indian state of Himachal Pradesh, of northern India (2004)

Scientific racism of the late 19th and early 20th centuries divided humans into three races based on "common physical characteristics": Caucasoid, Mongoloid, and Negroid.

American anthropologist Carleton S. Coon wrote that "India is the easternmost outpost of the Caucasian racial region" and defined the Indid race that occupies the Indian subcontinent as beginning in the Khyber Pass. John Montgomery Cooper, an American ethnologist and Roman Catholic priest, on 26 April 1945 in a hearing before the United States Senate "To Permit all people from India residing in the United States to be Naturalised" recorded:

The people of India are predominantly Caucasoid. Their features, hair texture, hairiness, the shape of the nose, mouth, and so on, are all distinctly Caucasoid. It is only in some of the far, out-of-the-way places of India, as in this country, that you find certain traces of other races.

The theory propounded by German comparative philologists in the 1840s and 1850s "maintained that the speakers of Indo-European languages in India, Persia, and Europe were of the same culture and race." This led to a distinction between the Indo-Aryan peoples of northern India and the Dravidian peoples, located mostly in southern India with pockets in the Baluchistan Province in the northwest and in the eastern corner of the Bihar Province.

Although anthropologists classify Dravidians as Caucasoid with the "Mediterranean-Caucasoid" type being the most predominant, the racial status of the Dravidians was initially disputed. In 1898, ethnographer Friedrich Ratzel remarked about the "Mongolian features" of Dravidians, resulting in what he described as his "hypothesis of their [Dravidians] close connection with the population of Tibet", whom he adds "Tibetans may be decidedly reckoned in the Mongol race". In 1899, Science summarised Ratzel's findings over India with,

"India is for the author [of the History of Mankind, Ratzel], a region where races have been broken up pulverized, kneaded by conquerors. Doubtless a pre-Dravidian negroid type came first, of low stature and mean physique, though these same are, in India, the result of poor social and economic conditions. Dravidians succeeded negroids, and there may have been Malay intrusions, but Australian affinities are denied. Then succeeded Aryan and Mongol, forming the present potporri through conquest and blending."

Edgar Thurston named what he called Homo Dravida and described it close to Australoids, with Caucasoid (Indo-Aryan) admixture. As evidence, he adduced the use of the boomerang by Kallar and Maravar warriors and the proficiency at tree-climbing among both the Kadirs of the Anamalai hills and the Dayaks of Borneo. In 1900, anthropologist Joseph Deniker said,

the Dravidian race is connected with both the Indonesian and Australian... the Dravidian race, which it would be better to call South Indian, is prevalent among the peoples of Southern India speaking the Dravidian tongues, and also among the Kols and other people of India... The Veddhas... come much nearer to the Dravidian type, which moreover also penetrates among the populations of India, even into the middle valley of the Ganges."

Deniker grouped Dravidians as a "subrace" under "Curly or Wavy Hair Dark Skin" in which he also includes the Ethiopian and Australian. Also, Deniker mentions that the "Indian race has its typical representatives among the Afghans, the Rajputs, the Brahmins and most of North India but it has undergone numerous alterations as a consequence with crosses with Assyriod, Dravidian, Mongol, Turkish, Arab and other elements."

In 1915, Arnold Wright said,

he [Dr. Caldwell] is inclined to believe in the Caucasian physical type of the Dravidians. To prove the general correctness of his reasoning, he points to the physical type of Todas, who are so distinctly Caucasic in the opinion of so many persons that they have been regarded as Celts, Romans, or Jews and of all the Dravidian tribes, [Todas] have been the most secluded.

Wright also mentions that Richard Lydekker and Flowers classified Dravidians as Caucasian. Later, Carleton S. Coon, in his book The Races of Europe (1939), reaffirmed this assessment and classified the Dravidians as Caucasoid due to their "Caucasoid skull structure" and other physical traits such as noses, eyes and hair, and 20th century anthropologists classified Dravidians as Caucasoid with the "Mediterranean-Caucasoid" type being the most predominant.

== See also ==
- Brown people
- Asian people
- Ethnic groups of South Asia
  - Indian people
  - Caste system in India
- Genetics and archaeogenetics of South Asia
  - mtDNA haplogroups in populations of South Asia
  - Y-DNA haplogroups in populations of South Asia
- Anglo-Indian
- Indo-African (disambiguation)
- Telingan
