= Atlantid race =

Obsolete racial classification of human being

The Atlantid race or North-Atlantid is an obsolete racial classification of human beings based on a now-disproven theory of biological race. In the early 20th century, it was described as one of the sub-races of the Caucasoid race, a blend of the Nordic and Mediterranean races.

== History ==
In his Die Mediterranen in Wales (1935), Egon Freiherr von Eickstedt coined the term "Atlantid" to denote a phenotype he stated was common in the British Isles. According to Bertil Lundman, it is synonymous with Joseph Deniker's earlier postulated "North-Occidental" or "North-Western" race, and also Czekanowski's "Northern-Western" subracial taxonomy. In the 1940s Lundman adopted the term "North-Atlantid" to cover these earlier terminologies, and further popularised it in The Races and Peoples of Europe (1977).

== Physical appearance ==
The Atlantid or North-Atlantid, as described by Eickstedt and Lundman, is recognised as having a pigmentation between the Nordic and Atlanto-Mediterranid stock of the Mediterranean. having predominantly light eyes with brown to black hair. The Atlantid is essentially a "Nordic-Mediterranean" blend, a term appearing in the literature of Earnest Hooton, but can differ in its exact gradient of pigmentation. Although usually recognised as intermediate between Nordic and Mediterranean, Deniker discussed what he saw occasionally as stronger Nordic or Mediterranean gradients.

== Geography and origin ==
The Atlantid race was said to be found mainly throughout Western Europe, being specially concentrated in the Celtic areas of the British Isles and the Atlantic coast of France.
