= Arabid race =

Outdated grouping of human beings

The Arabid race was a term used by ethnologists during the late 19th century and the early 20th century in an attempt to categorize a perceived racial division between speakers of Semitic languages and other people. Its proponents saw it as part of the so-called Caucasian race or even of a subspecies labelled Homo sapiens europaeus. It has been considered significantly outdated in the years since. Modern scientific consensus based on genetics rejects the concept of distinct human races in a biological sense.

In the early 20th century, Charles Gabriel Seligman described his perception of the occurrence of the "Arabid race" in the Sudan region:

In the Sudan area, classic Arabid types can be found among the Kababish and certain other Arabic-speaking desert tribes collectively known as Sudanese Arabs. Here, they often occur in solution with the local Hamitic Mediterranean type, which was the morphological taxon to which belonged the A-Group, C-Group and Meroitic culture makers, among certain other early populations in the region. Elsewhere, Arabid elements fuse with the Negroid type of the region's indigenous Nilo-Saharan speakers, the Nilotes, thereby producing an Afro-Arab hybrid type.

== See also ==
- Historical race concepts
- Semitic peoples
- Mediterranean race
- Irano-Afghan race
