= Homo (journal) =

Homo: Journal of Comparative Human Biology
- Discipline: Human biology, biological anthropology
- Language: English
- Edited by: Maciej Henneberg, Andrea Cucina, Friedrich W. Rösing, Frank J. Rühli, Stanley J. Ulijaszek

Publication details
- History: 1949-present
- Publisher: E. Schweizerbart
- Frequency: Quarterly
- Open access: Yes
- Impact factor: 0.788 (2018)

Standard abbreviations
- ISO 4: Homo

Indexing
- CODEN: HOMOA7
- ISSN: 0018-442X (print); 1618-1301 (web)
- OCLC no.: 867665246

Links
- Journal homepage

Homo: Journal of Comparative Human Biology (stylized in all-capitals as HOMO) is a quarterly peer-reviewed scientific journal covering the study of human biology. It was established in 1949 by Egon Freiherr von Eickstedt.

The editors-in-chief are Maciej Henneberg (University of Adelaide), Andrea Cucina (Universidad Autónoma de Yucatán), Friedrich W. Rösing (University of Ulm, son of von Eickstedt's assistant, Ilse Schwidestsky), Frank J. Rühli (University of Zurich), and Stanley J. Ulijaszek (University of Oxford).

== History ==
Homo is the successor of Zeitschrift für Rassenkunde, also founded and edited by Eickstedt.

=== Zeitschrift für Rassenkunde ===
In 1935, Egon Freiherr von Eickstedt started a German journal Zeitschrift für Rassenkunde (lit. 'Journal for Racial Studies'). It continued until 1944.

=== Homo: Internationale Zeitschrift für die vergleichende Forschung am Menschen ===
After the World War II, in 1949, Eickstedt established a new journal Homo, Internationale Zeitschrift für die vergleichende Forschung am Menschen as the successor of the Zeitschrift für Rassenkunde. The title Homo (the name of the human genus) was chosen to avoid terms suspicious of racism.

=== Homo: Journal of Comparative Human Biology ===
In sometime, the subtitle was rename to Homo: Journal of Comparative Human Biology.

Homo was published by Elsevier up to and including Volume 69 (2018) on behalf of the Australasian Society for Human Biology, of which it is the official journal. According to the Journal Citation Reports, the journal had a 2018 impact factor of 0.788.

From Volume 70 (2019) the journal is published by E. Schweizerbart Science Publishers, quarterly (four issues, formerly 6, but in a larger sub-A4 format). Homo is a gold Open Access journal starting with volume 73 (2022).
