= Josef Weninger =

Austrian anthropologist

Josef Weninger (15 May 1886 in Salzburg – 28 March 1959 in Vienna) was an Austrian anthropologist.

== Early life ==
Josef Weninger was born on 15 May 1886 in Salzburg, Austria.

== Career ==
Weninger taught as a professor at the University of Vienna.

From 1925, Weninger co-edited the journals Volk und Rasse ("Nation and Race") and Zeitschrift für Rassenkunde ("Journal for Racial Studies"). In 1927, he became the director of the Anthropological Institute in Vienna. His assistants were all members of the NSDAP and Weninger hosted their meetings at his home when the party was still illegal in Austria. In 1938, he was dismissed because his wife was "not Aryan", but was still able to deliver numerous "racial expertises" (Rassengutachten) and published several books on racial theories.

In 1945 he was reinstated as director of the institute, where he worked until 1957. He became a member of the Austrian Academy of Sciences and honorary president of the Anthropological Society of Vienna and the Association for European Ethnology of Vienna.

== Death ==
Weninger died on 28 March 1959 in Vienna.

== Bibliography ==
- Ernst Klee: Das Personenlexikon zum Dritten Reich. Wer war was vor und nach 1945 (Frankfurt, Fischer 2003), ISBN 3-10-039309-0.
