= John F. Timmons =

American agricultural economist (1912–1999)

John Francis Timmons (29 October 1912 – 13 April 1999) was an American agricultural economist.

== Early life, education, and career ==
John F. Timmons was born to parents Ernest Timmons and Nell Lawler on 29 October 1912, in Lewis or Linn County, Missouri. He was raised alongside five siblings, two brothers and three sisters. Timmons was educated in Wheeling, Missouri, and earned his bachelor's and master's degree in agricultural economics at University of Missouri, in 1937 and 1938, respectively. Timmons then pursued a doctorate in the same field at the University of Wisconsin–Madison until 1945, where he also graduated with a minor in law. After completing his undergraduate studies, Timmons was employed by the United States Department of Agriculture from 1939 to 1947, excepting 1941 to 1943, when he was an instructor at the University of Wisconsin. Timmons joined the faculty of Iowa State University in 1947, and was appointed the Charles F. Curtiss Distinguished Professor of Agriculture in 1972. He retained the distinguished professorship until retiring in 1983, upon which he was granted emeritus status. In 1974, Timmons was elected a fellow of the Agricultural & Applied Economics Association.

== Personal life and legacy ==
Timmons married Dorothy Langdon (1916–2018) in 1939. The couple raised eight children. Timmons began showing signs of Alzheimer's disease in 1987, and died on 13 April 1999 in Story City, Iowa. Iowa State University established the John F. Timmons Endowed Professorship in Environmental and Resource Economics in 2016, to honor him. The professorship was first held by Quinn Weninger.

== Selected publications ==
- Timmons, John F.; Murray, William G. (1950). Land Problems and Policies. Iowa State College Press.
