= Caucasian race =

Outdated grouping of human beings

The Caucasian race (also Caucasoid, (Note: The traditional anthropological term Caucasoid is a conflation of the demonym Caucasian and the Greek suffix eidos (meaning "form", "shape", "resemblance") implying a resemblance to the native inhabitants of the Caucasus. It etymologically contrasts with the terms Negroid, Mongoloid and Australoid. For a contrast with the "Mongolic" or Mongoloid race, see footnote #4 pp. 58–59 in Beckwith, Christopher (2009). Empires of the Silk Road: A History of Central Eurasia from the Bronze Age to the Present. Princeton and Oxford: Princeton University Press. ISBN 978-0-691-13589-2. OCLC 800915872.) Europid, or Europoid) is an obsolete racial classification of humans based on a now-disproven theory of biological race. The Caucasian race was historically regarded as a biological taxon which, depending on which of the historical race classifications was being used, usually included ancient and modern populations from Europe, West Asia, North Africa and some parts of South Asia, Central Asia and the Horn of Africa.

Introduced in the 1780s by members of the Göttingen school of history, (Note: Cited by contributing editor to a group of four works by Baum, Woodward, Rupke, and Simon.) the term denoted one of three purported major races of humans (those three being Caucasoid, Mongoloid, and Negroid). In biological anthropology, Caucasoid has been used as an umbrella term for phenotypically similar groups from these different regions, with a focus on skeletal anatomy, and especially cranial morphology, without regard to skin tone. Ancient and modern "Caucasoid" populations were thus not exclusively "white", but ranged in complexion from white-skinned to dark brown.

Since the second half of the 20th century, physical anthropologists have switched from a typological understanding of human biological diversity towards a genomic and population-based perspective, and have tended to understand race as a social classification of humans based on phenotype and ancestry as well as cultural factors, as the concept is also understood in the social sciences.

In the United States, the root term Caucasian is still in use as a synonym for people considered "white" or of European, West Asian, or North African ancestry as defined by the United States census. Currently, its continued usage as a racial descriptor has been criticized. The term also sees usage in other English-speaking countries like Australia.

== History of the concept ==
=== Caucasus as the origin of humanity and the peak of beauty ===
In the eighteenth century, the prevalent view among European scholars was that the human species had its origin in the region of the Caucasus Mountains. This view was based upon the Caucasus being the location for the purported landing point of Noah's Ark – from whom the Bible states that humanity is descended – and the location for the suffering of Prometheus, who in Hesiod's myth had crafted humankind from clay.

In addition, the most beautiful humans were reputed by Europeans to be the stereotypical "Circassian beauties" and the Georgians; both Georgia and Circassia are in the Caucasus region. The "Circassian beauty" stereotype had its roots in the Middle Ages, while the reputation for the attractiveness of the Georgian people was developed by early modern travellers to the region such as Jean Chardin.

=== Göttingen school of history ===
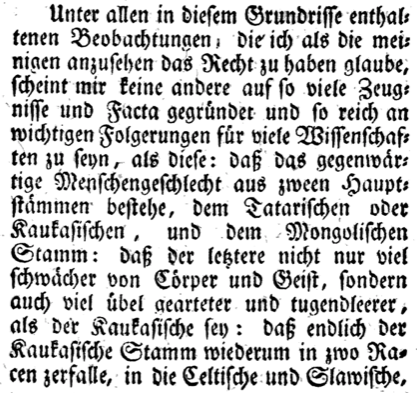
Christoph Meiners' 1785 treatise The Outline of History of Mankind was the first work to use the term Caucasian (Kaukasisch) in its wider racial sense. (Click on image for English translation of the text)

The term Caucasian as a racial category was introduced in the 1780s by members of the Göttingen school of history — notably Christoph Meiners in 1785 and Johann Friedrich Blumenbach in 1795. It had originally referred in a narrow sense to the native inhabitants of the Caucasus region.

In his The Outline of History of Mankind (1785), the German philosopher Christoph Meiners first used the concept of a "Caucasian" (Kaukasisch) race in its wider racial sense. As a supporter of the polygenist theory of human origins, he subscribed to a "binary [greater] racial scheme" of superior Caucasians and inferior Mongoloids in which he did not include Jews as Caucasians and to whom he ascribed a "permanently degenerate nature". Using a "bundle of notions" led to creations of purported subraces on a continental and state basis with implied decreased respective scientific weight. Meiners' term was given wider circulation in the 1790s by many people. (Note: Cited by contributing editor to a group of nine works by Mario, Isaac, Schiebinger, Rupp-Eisenreich, Dougherty, Hochman, Mikkelsen, Painter, and Binden.) Other members of the Göttingen school of history would make the addition of Negroids.

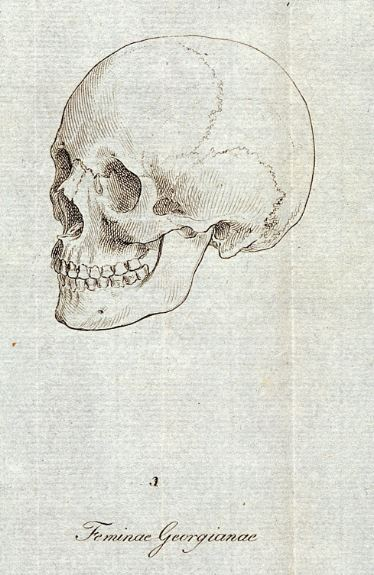
Drawing of the skull of a Georgian female by Johann Friedrich Blumenbach, used as an archetype for the Caucasian racial characteristics in his 1795 De Generis Humani Varietate

It was Johann Friedrich Blumenbach, a colleague of Meiners', who later came to be considered one of the founders of the discipline of anthropology, who gave the term a wider audience, by grounding it in the new methods of craniometry and Linnean taxonomy. Blumenbach did not credit Meiners with his taxonomy, although his justification clearly points to Meiners' aesthetic viewpoint of Caucasus origins. In contrast to Meiners, however, Blumenbach was a monogenist—he considered all humans to have a shared origin and to be a single species. Blumenbach, like Meiners, did rank his Caucasian grouping higher than other groups in terms of mental faculties or potential for achievement despite pointing out that the transition from one race to another is so gradual that the distinctions between the races presented by him are "very arbitrary". Alongside the anthropologist Georges Cuvier, Blumenbach classified the Caucasian race by cranial measurements and bone morphology in addition to skin pigmentation. He ultimately imagined that the Caucasian race encompassed all of the ancient and most of the modern native populations of Europe, the aboriginal inhabitants of West Asia (including the Phoenicians, Hebrews and Arabs), the autochthones of Northern Africa (Berbers, Egyptians, Abyssinians and neighboring groups), the Indians, and the ancient Guanches. This usage later grew into the widely used color terminology for race, contrasting with the terms Negroid, Mongoloid, and Australoid.

=== Carleton Coon ===
There was never consensus among the proponents of the "Caucasoid race" concept regarding how it would be delineated from other groups such as the proposed Mongoloid race. Carleton S. Coon (1939) included the populations native to all of Central and Northern Asia, including the Ainu people, under the Caucasoid label. Many scientists maintained the racial categorizations of color established by Meiners' and Blumenbach's works, along with many other early steps of anthropology, well into the 20th century as they were increasingly used to justify political policies such as segregation and immigration restrictions. For example, Thomas Henry Huxley (1870) classified all populations of Asian nations as Mongoloid. Lothrop Stoddard (1920) in turn classified as "brown" most of the populations of the Middle East, North Africa, the Horn of Africa, Central Asia and South Asia. He counted as "white" only European peoples and their descendants, as well as a few populations in areas adjacent to or opposite southern Europe, in parts of Anatolia and parts of the Rif and Atlas mountains.

In 1939, Coon claimed that the Caucasian race had originated through admixture between Homo neanderthalensis and Homo sapiens of the "Mediterranean type" which he considered to be distinct from Caucasians, rather than a subtype of it as others had done. While Blumenbach had erroneously thought that light skin color was ancestral to all humans and the dark skin of southern populations was due to sun, Coon thought that Caucasians had lost their original pigmentation as they moved North. Coon used the term "Caucasoid" and "White race" synonymously.

In 1962, Coon published The Origin of Races, wherein he proposed a polygenist view, that human races had evolved separately from local varieties of Homo erectus. He divided humans into five main races and claimed that each evolved in parallel but at different rates, so that some races had reached higher levels of evolution than others. He claimed that the Caucasoid race had evolved 200,000 years prior to the "Congoid race", and hence represented a higher evolutionary stage.

Coon also claimed that Caucasoid traits emerged prior to the Cro-Magnons, and were present in the Skhul and Qafzeh hominins. However, these fossils and the Predmost specimen were held to be Neanderthaloid derivatives because they possessed short cervical vertebrae, lower and narrower pelves, and had some Neanderthal skull traits. Coon further asserted that the Caucasoid race was of dual origin, consisting of early dolichocephalic (e.g. Galley Hill, Combe-Capelle, Téviec) and Neolithic Mediterranean Homo sapiens (e.g. Muge, Long Barrow, Corded), as well as Neanderthal-influenced brachycephalic Homo sapiens dating to the Mesolithic and Neolithic (e.g. Afalou, Hvellinge, Fjelkinge).

Coon's theories on race were much disputed in his lifetime, and are considered pseudoscientific in modern anthropology.

=== Disproof by modern genetics ===
The fact that there are no sharp distinctions between the supposed racial groups had been observed by Blumenbach and later by Charles Darwin.

With the availability of new data due to the development of modern genetics, the concept of races in a biological sense has become untenable. Problems of the concept include: It "is not useful or necessary in research", scientists are not able to agree on the definition of a certain proposed race, and they do not even agree on the number of races, with some proponents of the concept suggesting 300 or even more "races". Also, data are not reconcilable with the concept of a treelike evolution nor with the concept of "biologically discrete, isolated, or static" populations.

=== Current scientific consensus ===
After discussing various criteria used in biology to define subspecies or races, Alan R. Templeton concludes in 2016: "[T]he answer to the question whether races exist in humans is clear and unambiguous: no."

== Classification ==
In the 19th century Meyers Konversations-Lexikon (1885–1890), Caucasoid was one of the three great races of humankind, alongside Mongoloid and Negroid. The taxon was taken to consist of a number of subtypes. The Caucasoid peoples were usually divided into three groups on ethnolinguistic grounds, termed Aryan (Indo-European), Semitic (Semitic languages), and Hamitic (Hamitic languages i.e. Berber-Cushitic-Egyptian).

19th century classifications of the peoples of India were initially uncertain if the Dravidians and the Sinhalese were Caucasoid or a separate Dravida race, but by and in the 20th century, anthropologists predominantly declared Dravidians to be Caucasoid.

Historically, the racial classification of the Turkic peoples was sometimes given as "Turanid". Turanid racial type or "minor race", subtype of the Europid (Caucasian) race with Mongoloid admixtures, situated at the boundary of the distribution of the Mongoloid and Europid "great races".

There was no universal consensus of the validity of the "Caucasoid" grouping within those who attempted to categorize human variation. Thomas Henry Huxley in 1870 wrote that the "absurd denomination of 'Caucasian'" was in fact a conflation of his Xanthochroi (Nordic) and Melanochroi (Mediterranean) types.

=== Skull and teeth ===
Drawing from Petrus Camper's theory of facial angle, Blumenbach and Cuvier classified races, through their skull collections based on their cranial features and anthropometric measurements. Caucasoid traits were recognised as: thin nasal aperture ("nose narrow"), a small mouth, facial angle of 100–90°, and orthognathism, exemplified by what Blumenbach saw in most ancient Greek crania and statues. Later anthropologists of the 19th and early 20th century such as James Cowles Prichard, Charles Pickering, Broca, Paul Topinard, Samuel George Morton, Oscar Peschel, Charles Gabriel Seligman, Robert Bennett Bean, William Zebina Ripley, Alfred Cort Haddon and Roland Dixon came to recognize other Caucasoid morphological features, such as prominent supraorbital ridges and a sharp nasal sill. Many anthropologists in the 20th century used the term "Caucasoid" in their literature, such as William Clouser Boyd, Reginald Ruggles Gates, Carleton S. Coon, Sonia Mary Cole, Alice Mossie Brues and Grover Krantz replacing the earlier term "Caucasian" as it had fallen out of usage.

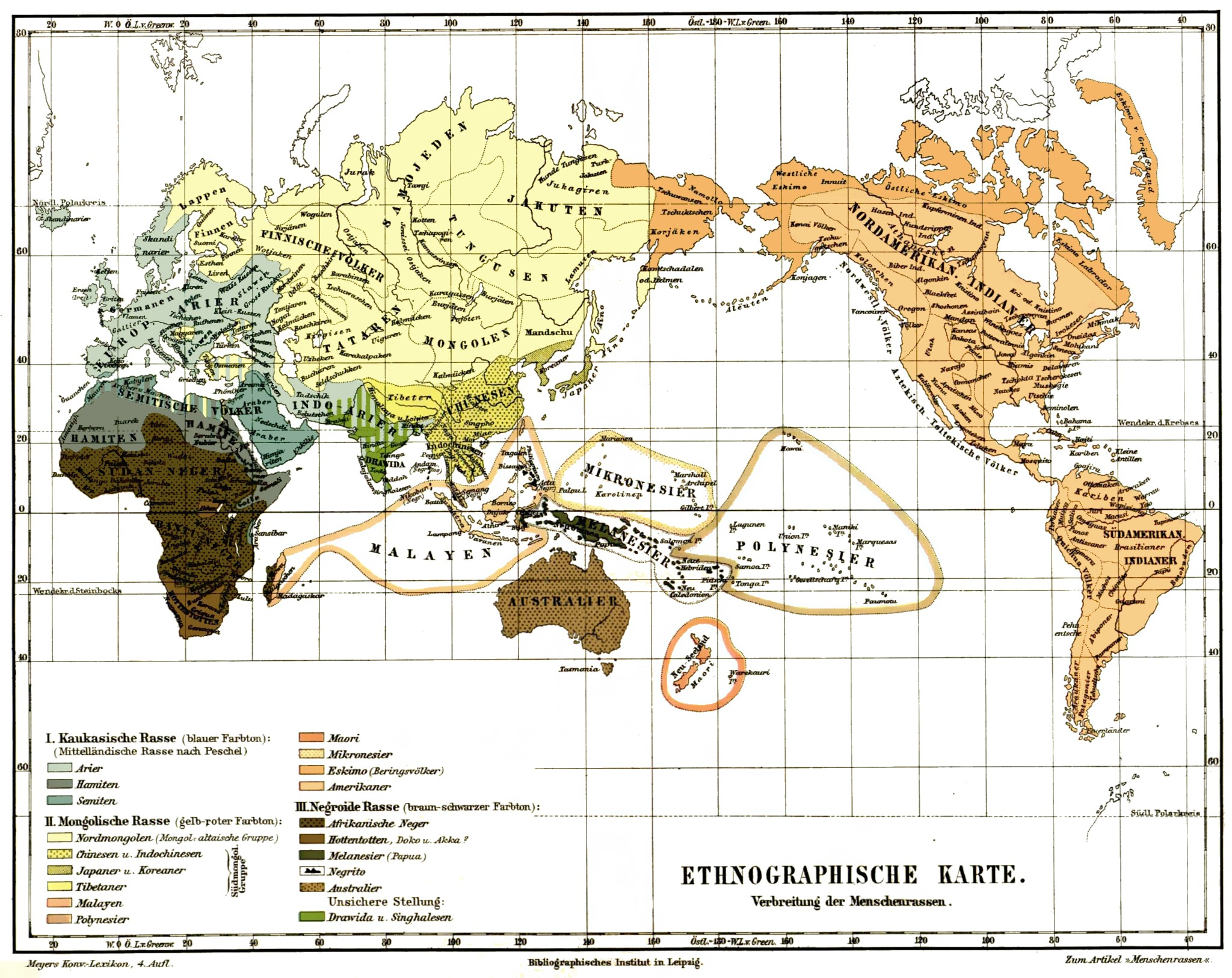
Meyers Konversations-Lexikon (1885–1890) ethnographic map: Caucasoid: Aryan Semitic Hamitic Negroid: African Negro Khoikhoi Melanesian Negrito Australoid Uncertain: Dravida & Sinhalese / Mongoloid: North Mongol Chinese & Indochinese Korean & Japanese Tibetan & Burmese Malay Polynesian Maori Micronesian Eskimo / Inuit American

=== Subraces ===
The postulated subraces vary depending on the author, including but not limited to Mediterranean, Atlantid, Nordic, East Baltic, Alpine, Dinaric, Turanid, Armenoid, Iranid, Indid, Arabid, and Hamitic. Some authors also proposed a Pamirid race (or Pamir-Fergana race) in Central Asia, named after the Pamir range and the Fergana valley.

H.G. Wells argued that across Europe, North Africa, the Horn of Africa, West Asia, Central Asia and South Asia, a Caucasian physical stock existed. He divided this racial element into two main groups: a shorter and darker Mediterranean or Iberian race and a taller and lighter Nordic race. Wells asserted that Semitic and Hamitic populations were mainly of Mediterranean type, and Aryan populations were originally of Nordic type. He regarded the Basques as descendants of early Mediterranean peoples, who inhabited western Europe before the arrival of Aryan Celts from the direction of central Europe.

The "Northcaucasian race" is a sub-race proposed by Carleton S. Coon (1930). It comprises the native populations of the North Caucasus, the Balkars, Karachays and Vainakh (Chechens and Ingushs).

An introduction to anthropology, published in 1953, gives a more complex classification scheme:

- "Archaic Caucasoid Races": Ainu people in Japan, Australoid race, Dravidian peoples, and Vedda
- "Primary Caucasoid Races": Alpine race, Armenoid race, Mediterranean race, and Nordic race
- "Secondary or Derived Caucasoid Races": Dinaric race, East Baltic race, and Polynesian race

== Usage in the United States and Australia ==
Besides its use in anthropology and related fields, the term "Caucasian" has often been used in the United States in a different, social context to describe a group commonly called "white people". "White" also appears as a self-reporting entry in the U.S. Census. Naturalization as a United States citizen was restricted to "free white persons" by the Naturalization Act of 1790, and later extended to other resident populations by the Naturalization Act of 1870, Indian Citizenship Act of 1924 and Immigration and Nationality Act of 1952. The Supreme Court in United States v. Bhagat Singh Thind (1923) decided that Asian Indians were ineligible for citizenship because, though deemed "Caucasian" anthropologically, they were not white like European descendants since most laypeople did not consider them to be "white" people. This represented a change from the Supreme Court's earlier opinion in Ozawa v. United States, in which it had expressly approved of two lower court cases holding "high caste Hindus" to be "free white persons" within the meaning of the naturalization act. Government lawyers later recognized that the Supreme Court had "withdrawn" this approval in Thind. In 1946, the U.S. Congress passed a new law establishing a small immigration quota for Indians, which also permitted them to become citizens. Major changes to immigration law, however, only later came in 1965, when many earlier racial restrictions on immigration were lifted.

The United States National Library of Medicine often used the term "Caucasian" as a race in the past. However, it later discontinued such usage in favor of the more narrow geographical term European, which traditionally only applied to a subset of Caucasoids.

In Australia, the federal and state police forces continue to use the descriptor Caucasian, along with Aboriginal, Asian, and other as of March 2025.

== See also ==
- Anthropometry
- Leucism
- Race (human categorization)
- Race and ethnicity in the United States Census
- Race and genetics
