= Telingan =

Term in British Victorian racial science

Telingan, or Indian race, was a term in British Victorian racial science, now discredited, referring a subset of the inhabitants of "the eastern parts of India, especially about Calcutta, several isolated spots in other parts of India, and the east coast of Madagascar" with "dark complexion, (best imitated by a mixture of red and black) the skin is soft, the features are like those of Europeans, hair straight and fine, and the beard copious":

The Eastern Hindoos, those at least who make visits to the East India islands, present great uniformity in their personal appearance; and, in this respect, they agree with the tribes and nations situated to the eastward of Hindostan.

The complexion is much the same as in the two preceding races, and is so decidedly darker than in the Malayan, that by common consent it is called black; although, on comparison, the hue differs widely from that of the unmixed Negro. The true colour may be formed by mixing red and black; and in reference to the use of the term of "purplebrown" and that of "olive," it should be observed that neither blue nor green enter into any variety of human complexion.

The features approximate very closely to those of the White race; but, in general, the mouth appeared to be wider, the nose rather less prominent, and the lips sensibly thicker. The profile was observed to be less vertical than in the surrounding Malays; the lower part of the face projecting with a regular arch, as in the Mongolian; and there was a further correspondence with the latter race, in the frequent instances of the arched nose.

The skin was ascertained to be very soft. The beard occurred more frequently, and was decidedly more copious than in the Malayan race. The hair was straight and fine, and I have never seen it of any other colour than black. I have not met with Albinoes in the Telingan race.

I am unable at present to refer to a characteristic portrait of the Telingan race; most of the published figures of Hindoos having been taken either from the White race or from mixtures.
