= Quinn Weninger =

Canadian-American economist (born 1962)

Quinn Rone Arthur Weninger (born 27 January 1962) is a Canadian-American economist.

Weninger was born in Kelowna, British Columbia on 27 January 1962. Weninger graduated from the University of Alberta in 1989 with a degree in forest science, and completed doctoral studies at the University of Maryland in 1995, specializing in agricultural and resource economics. From 1996 to 2000, he taught at Utah State University. In 2000, Weninger joined the Iowa State University faculty, where in April 2016, he was appointed to the John F. Timmons Endowed Professorship in Environmental and Resource Economics.
