= Egon Freiherr von Eickstedt =

German physical anthropologist

Egon von Eickstedt
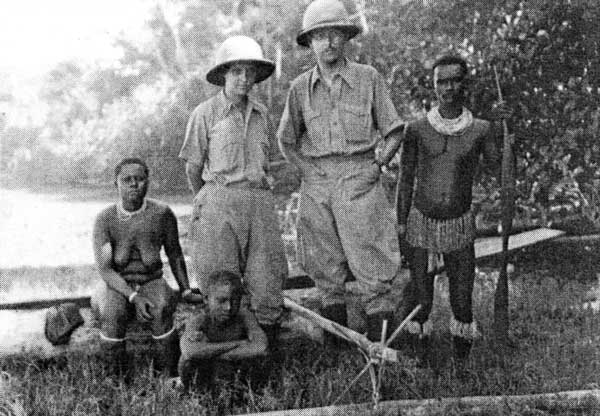
- The von Eickstedts in the Andamans (1926)
- Born: 10 April 1892; Jersitz, Province of Posen
- Died: 20 December 1965 (aged 73); Mainz, Rhineland-Palatinate
- Citizenship: German
- Education: Leipzig University; University of Mainz; University of Wrocław
- Occupations: Racial theorist, anthropologist, university professor
- Notable work: Rassenkunde und Rassengeschichte der Menschheit
- Title: Baron
- Political party: Nazi Party
- Parents: Hans Carl Adolf Dubslaff von Eickstedt (father); Elisabeth Agnes Dorette Martha (mother)

Egon Freiherr von Eickstedt (Egon Rudolf Ernst Adolf Hans Dubslaff Freiherr von Eickstedt) (April 10, 1892 – December 20, 1965) was a German physical anthropologist who classified humanity into races. His study in the classification of human races made him one of the leading racial theorists of Nazi Germany.

== Biography ==
Egon Freiherr von Eickstedt was born on April 10, 1892, in Jersitz, Province of Posen. He studied Berlin, Halberstadt and Dresden before going to the University of Berlin to study geography and philosophy. He became interested in physical anthropology at the University of Vienna under Felix von Luschan. He then travelled in Europe and north Africa and it was interrupted by World War I. He then volunteered in the medical corps conducting physical anthropology studies on prisoners of war, particularly Sikh soldiers. This became the basis for his doctoral work at the University of Frankfurt am Main under Norbert Krebs and Luschan in 1920. He worked at the anatomical institute of the University of Freiburg under Krebs and Eugen Fischer. He worked in Vienna from 1924. From 1926 he worked with Theodor Mollison at the Anthropological Institute in Munich. In the same year he visited India, travelling 31000 kilometers until 1929 examining various peoples. He did not publish his findings and for this he was chided by Emil Breitinger (1904–2004), Biraja Sankar Guha (1894–1961) and Siegfried Passarge (1866–1958). He returned home to become a full professor of anthropology at the University of Breslau. In 1934 he began studies on the people of Upper Silesia. He concluded from his studies that the people were predominantly "Nordic" and therefore German. He however also noted that there was a lot of admixture. This did not go well with his sponsors in the Nazi bureaucracy who prevented him from publishing his findings. In 1935 he was involved in founding the Zeitschrift für Rassenkunde (Journal of Racial Studies) and edited it from 1935 to 1944 along with others like Hans F. K. Günther. In 1934 he published the book Rassenkunde und Rassengeschichte der Menschheit (Ethnology and the Race History of Mankind). During 1937-39 he visited Southeast Asia and produced another book. At the end of World War II he escaped to Leipzig and was interrogated by the Soviet NKVD in June 1946. He then went to the University of Mainz along with his student Ilse Schwidetzky (1907–1997). After the World War II, in 1949, Eickstedt established a journal Homo. Internationale Zeitschrift für die vergleichende Forschung am Menschen as the successor of the Zeitschrift für Rassenkunde. He worked until 1950. At the end of his career he took an interest in the Kurds and wrote another book.

He was married to Elvira Gomes born Costa Macedo in 1916. He died on December 20, 1965.

== Bibliography ==
[Source: Schwidetzky (1983)]

- Eickstedt, E. v.: 1920-21: Rassenelemente der Sikh. - Z. Ethnol. 52–53, 317–368.
- Eickstedt, E. v. - 1923: A comparative anthropometry of 144 Punjabis. - Man in India 3, 161–188.
- Eickstedt, E. v. - 1923: 50 Typen aus Europa, Afrika, Indien. - Leipzig.
- Eickstedt, E. v. - 1924: Results of descriptions and measurements of 68 Muhammadans from the Punjab. - Man in India 3, 177–189.
- Eickstedt, E. v. - 1926: Tamilen. - Arch. Rassenbilder, Bildaufsatz 1, Archivkarte 1–10. - 1926: Indische Tänzerinnen. - Völkerkde. 7/9, 155–157. - 1926: Die Diebskaste der Kallar in Südindien. - Völkerkde. 7/9, 6–15.
- Eickstedt, E. v. - 1926: The races and types of the Western and Central Himalayas. - Man in India 6, 237- 276.
- Eickstedt, E. v. - 1926: Zur Anthropologie der Garhwali im Himalaya. - Mitt. Anthrop. Ges. Wien 65, 173–183.
- Eickstedt, E. v. - 1927: Der Stammbaum von Rabindranath Tagore. - Arch. Rass. Ges. Biol. 19, 1–16.
- Eickstedt, E. v. - 1927: Rassengeschichte einer singhalesisch-weddaischen Adelsfamilie. - Arch. Rass. Ges. Biol. 19, 369–388.
- Eickstedt, E. v. - 1927: Sterbendes Urwaldvolk. - Völkerkde. 10, 217–225.
- Eickstedt, E. v. - 1927: Ceylon (1. Anthrop. Bericht der D.I.E.). - Anthrop. Anz. 4, 208–219.
- Eickstedt, E. v. - 1927: Das Bergvolk der Sora. - Umschau 31, 1034–1035.
- Eickstedt, E. v. - 1928: Über das Aussterben der Negritos auf den Andamanen. - Arch. Rass. Ges. Biol. 21, 1–4.
- Eickstedt, E. v.,- 1928: Bei den Weddas. - Umschau 32, 71–77.
- Eickstedt, E. v. - 1928: Die Soras (2. Anthrop. Ber. der D. I.E.). - Anthrop. Anz. 5, 68–75.
- Eickstedt, E. v. - 1928: Das Rassenbild des westlichen und zentralen Hinterindien (3. Anthrop. Ber. der D.I.E.). - Anthrop. Anz. 5, 176–187. - 1928: Die Negritos der Andamanen (4. Anthrop. Ber. der D.I.E.). - Anthrop. Anz. 5, 251–268.
- Eickstedt, E. v. - 1929*. Anthropologische Forschungen in Südindien (5. Anthrop. Ber. der D.I.E.). - Anthrop. Anz. 6, 64–85. - 1929: Die historische Stellung der Weddas und die Frühbesiedlung Ceylons. - Ethnol. Stu- dien 1,40-74.
- Eickstedt, E. v. - 1930: Überblick über Verlauf und Arbeiten der Deutschen Indien-Expedition 1926–29. - Tag. Ber. Ges. Völkerkunde, 63–84.
- Eickstedt, E. v. - 1930: Unter den andamanesischen Zwergnegern. Vom Leben und Forschen der Deutschen Indien-Expedition. - Umschau 34, 246–250; 268–271.
- Eickstedt, E. v. - 1930: Bei den letzten Ureinwohnern Ceylons. - Atlantis 88–92.
- Eickstedt, E. v. - 1931: Mongolen in Innerindien. - Umschau 35, 1034–1038.
- Eickstedt, E. v. - 1931: Die geographischen Bedingungen meiner rassenkundlichen Untersuchungen in Süd- asien. - Anthropos 26, 193–215.
- Eickstedt, E. v. - 1931: Die nordindischen Dschungelstämme: ein somatoskopischer Entwurf (6. Anthrop. Ber. der D.I.E.). - Anthrop. Anz. 7, 266–285.
- Eickstedt, E. v. - 1931: Der Zentral-Dekkan und die Rassengliederung Indiens (7. Anthrop. Ber. der D.I.E.). - Anthrop. Anz. 8, 89–103.
- Eickstedt, E. v. - 1932: Rasse und Raum in Indien. - Geogr. Tag. Danzig.
- Eickstedt, E. v. - 1933: Die Rassengeschichte von Indien unter besonderer Berücksichtigung von Mysore. - Z. Morph. Anthrop. 32, 77–124.
- Eickstedt, E. v. - 1933: "India" and "Indochina". - Enciclopedia Italiana. - 1934: Rassenkunde und Rassengeschichte der Menschheit. - Stuttgart (S. 154–163; 175 - 185, 331–333).
- Eickstedt, E. v. - 1935: The position of Mysore in India's racial history. - In: Iyer, L. K. A., The Mysore tribes and castes, 3-80. Mysore.
- Eickstedt, E. v. - 1936: Arier und Nagas. Das historische Gegenspiel in der Kulturdynamik des indo-ceylone- sischen Völkerkreises. - In: Festschrift Hermann Hirt I, 357–405. Heidelberg.
- Eickstedt, E. v. - 1937: Geschichte der anthropologischen Namengebung und Klassifikation unter besonderer Berücksichtigung von Südasien. - Z. Rassenk. 5, 209–282; 6, 36–90, 151–219.
- Eickstedt, E. v. - 1938: Forschungen in Süd- und Ostasien. I. Travancore, Cochinchina und Kambodscha. - Z. Rassenk. 7, 294–333.
- Eickstedt, E. v. - 1939: The history of anthropological research in India. - Introduction to Iyer, L. A. K., The Travancore tribes and castes II, 16–54. Trivandrum.
- Eickstedt, E. v. - 1944: Die indische Dynamik: ein west-östlicher Vergleich. - In: v. Eickstedt, E., Rassen- dynamik von Ostasien, 393–451. Berlin.
- Eickstedt, E. v. - 1952: Rassentypen und Typendynamik von Asien. - In: Historia Mundi I, 147–166.
- Eickstedt, E. v. - 1956: Der Ursprung der Inder. - In: Indien und Deutschland. Nehru-Festschrift, 48-7
