= Bertil Lundman =

Swedish anthropologist (1899–1993)

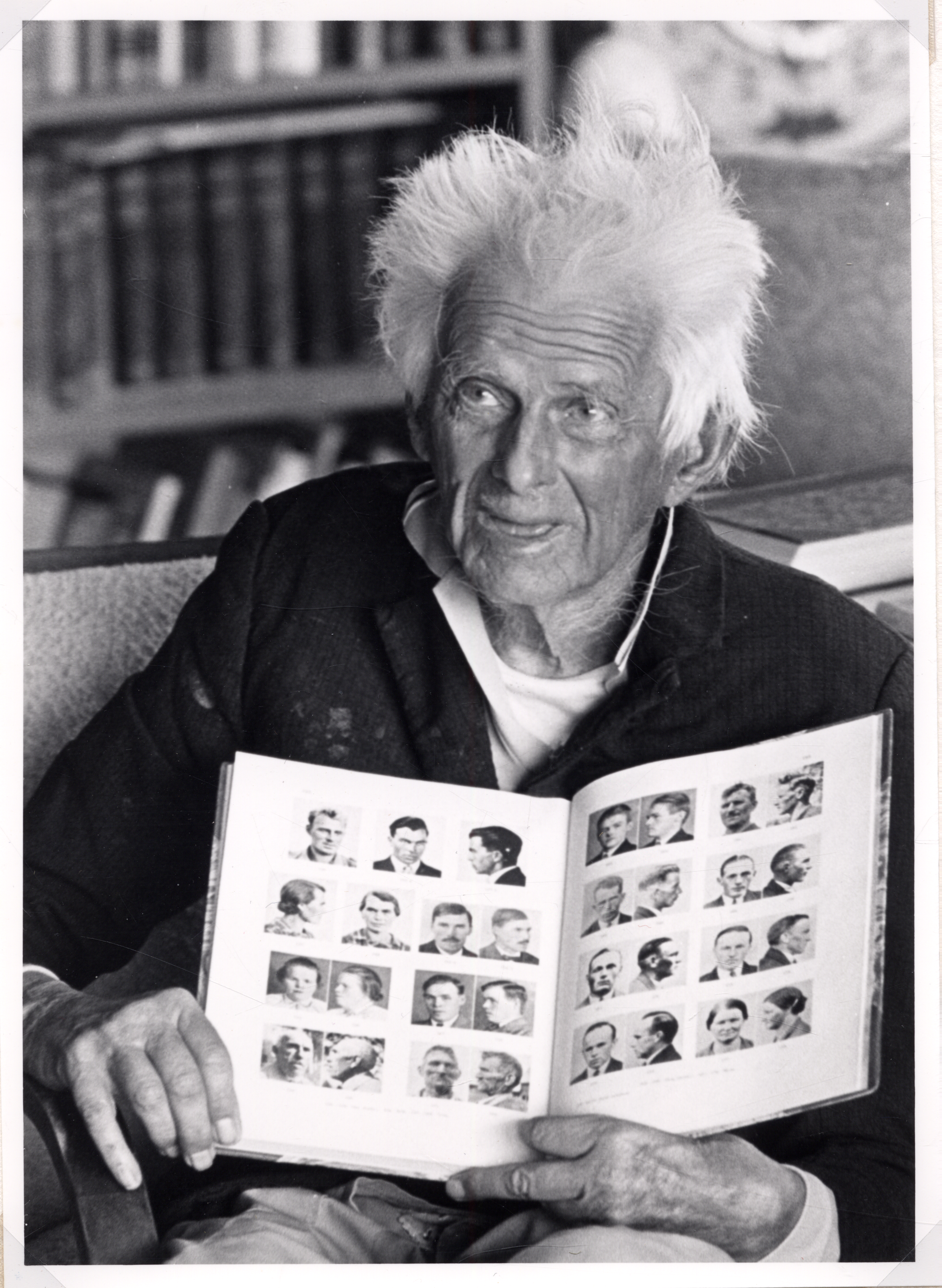
- Bertil Lundman in 1987
- Born: Bertil Johannes Lundman; 16 February 1899; Malmö, Sweden
- Died: 5 November 1993 (aged 94); Uppsala, Sweden
- Occupations: Anthropologist, eugenicist
- Known for: Race classification

Bertil J. Lundman (28 September 1899, Malmö – 5 November 1993, Uppsala) was a Swedish anthropologist.

== Early life ==
Lundman was born on 28 September 1899, in Malmö.

== Career ==
Lundman was an anthropologist. In the 1930s, he wrote an article in Zeitschrift für Rassenkunde, a German journal of racial studies. Later, he served on the executive committee of the International Association for the Advancement of Ethnology and Eugenics. He created a racial classification system of Europeans in his book The Races and Peoples of Europe (1977).

According to Swedish historian Martin Ericsson, Lundman made some of the "most racist" claims among Swedish researchers on the subject in the 20th century, placing Nordic people on the top of his racial hierarchy and thus in some way resembling the "Nazi Aryan myth".

== Death ==
Lundman died on 5 November 1993.

== Bibliography ==
- "Västmanlandstyper, Julläsning", Västmanlands läns tidning (in Swedish) (1931)
- "Folktypsundersökningar i Dalarna I-IX", Dalarnas hembygdsbok (in Swedish) (1932–38, 1940, 1946)
- Nordens rastyper, (in Swedish) (1940)
- Sveriges religiösa geografi, (in Swedish) (1942)
- Jordens människoraser och folkstammar (in Swedish) (1943-44)
- Dala-allmogens antropologi (doctoral dissertation), (in Swedish) (1945)
- "On the Origin of the Lapps", Ethnos (1946)
- Nutidens människoraser (in Swedish) (1946)
- Recent racial research in Finland (1946)
- Raser och folkstockar i Baltoskandia (in Swedish) (1946, 1967)
- Dalarnas folk typer och härstamning (in Swedish) (1948)
- "Ergebnisse der anthropologischen Lappenforchung", Anthropos (in German) (1952)
- Umriss der Rassenkunde des Menschen in geschichtlicher Zeit (in German) (1952)
- Stammeskunde der Völker (Ethnogonie) Eine Uebersicht (in German) (1961)
- "The Racial History of Scandinavia", The Mankind Quarterly (1962)
- Kort översikt av Sveriges etnogeografi (in Swedish) (1966)
- Blutgruppenforschung und geograpische Anthropologie (in German) (1967)
- Baltoskandias antropologi (in Swedish) (1967)
- Geographische Anthropologie (in German) (1967)
- Tribes of the Earth (1969)
- The human races of the earth or the geographical variation of man through climatic adaptations and migrations (1969)
- Concise Ethnogeography (1970)
- The Races and Peoples of Europe (translation) (1977)
- Minnen (memoirs) (in Swedish) (1987)
- Jordens folkstammar (in Swedish) (1988)
