= Weininger =

Weininger is a German surname. Notable people with the surname include:

- Chad Weininger (born 1972), American business owner and politician
- David Weininger (1952–2016), American chemist and entrepreneur
- Otto Weininger (1880–1903), Austrian philosopher
