= Irano-Afghan race =

Obsolete racial classification term

The Irano-Afghan race or Iranid race is an obsolete racial classification of human beings based on a now-disproven theory of biological race. Some anthropologists of the 20th century classified the populations native to the Iranian plateau as belonging to this race, which was usually seen as a subrace of the Caucasian race or the Mediterranean racial subtype of that race, depending on the authority consulted.

== Physiognomy ==
American anthropologist Carleton S. Coon described the Irano-Afghan race as a branch of the Mediterranean race, describing them as being long-faced, high-headed and leptorrhine (having long and narrow noses). By contrast, Swedish anthropologist Bertil Lundman postulates an "Iranid" subtype of his "Eastern Mediterranean" race. American anthropologist Earnest Hooton in 1946 describes the "Iranian Plateau type" as distinct from the Atlanto-Mediterranean one:

particularly in its long, high-bridged, and boldly jutting nasal promontory. It has the same huge dolichocephalic head and massive, usually long face. The great nose may be either straight or convex, more often the latter.

According to Italian anthropologist Renato Biasutti the type was defined by:

Brunet-white color, very dark hair and eyes, abundant pilosity; medium stature (165), slim body; very long (74) and high head with prominent occiput; long face; large and high nose with root at the level of the forehead, straight or convex spine, strongly curved nostrils (64); full lips, robust chin.

British anthropologist John Lawrence Angel, following Coon in 1971, discusses a "Nordic-Iranian type" in the following terms:

D1 lies between Anglo-Saxon and Keltic area norms, and D2 is the earlier pre-Bronze Age Corded form which Coon identifies. Type D3, lighter and more hawk-nosed, is transitional to the Mediterranean type B4 and to type D4 (Iranian), which is the Proto-Iranian of Vallois, Irano-Afghan of others, and Proto-Nordic of Krogman, and which is more linear and more rugged than D3 and has a more tilted chewing plane, more nasal convexity, and deeper occiput. Type D5 approximates Coon's Danubian-Halstatt and successor Central European forms.
