= Ilse Schwidetzky =

German anthropologist

Ilse Schwidetzky (married name Rösing, 6 September 1907, in Lissa – 18 March 1997, in Mainz) was a German anthropologist.

== Biography ==
Ise Schwidetzky was the daughter of Georg and Susanne Schwidetzky. Susanne Schwidetzky, who studied math at the University of Berlin around 1900, died in 1911 of tuberculosis. Georg Schwidetzky studied law and had a successful political career which ended with World War I. The family moved to Leipzig, where Georg Schwidetzky worked for Die Deutsche Bücherei, roughly equivalent to the Library of Congress. Ilse Schwidetzky had three siblings, Eva (born in 1905, died 1958), Walter (born in 1910, died in 1996), and Georg (a half-brother born in 1917, died in 2003). She is related to Oscar Schwidetzky, who invented the ace bandage and was the first non-MD admitted to the American Medical Association (common relative, Leopold Schwidetzky, her great-grandfather).

Ilse Schwidetzky studied history, biology and anthropology in Leipzig and Breslau. From the 1930s, she worked as the assistant of Egon Freiherr von Eickstedt, one of the leading racial theorists of Nazi Germany. Schwidetzky married Bernhard Rösing in 1940, also a professor. They lived in different cities. Then and now it is not uncommon for two-professor couples in Germany to live apart given how few positions there are for professors. The couple had three children, among them ethnologist Ina Rösing and anthropologist Friedrich Wilhelm Rösing. Bernhard Rösing was killed in a train accident in 1944. The train carried an army reserve unit of which Bernhard Rösing was a member. The unit was tasked with conducting clean up operations. It was a "regular" train accident and technically not caused by any military action, but trains ran without lights on to avoid allied bombing, and the train accident might not have happened under normal circumstances. Ilse Schwidetzky wrote a fascinating account of her experiences during World War II ("The War Years"). According to that account, Bernhard Rösing was given a military funeral. He was the only member of Ilse Schwidetzky's closer family who died during World War II. All of her children, her siblings and her father survived the war.

Schwidetzky worked at the newly founded Anthropological Institute at Mainz University from 1946, succeeding Eickstedt as Mainz Professor of Anthropology in 1961 until her retirement in 1975. She published under her maiden name, not her married name.

== Awards and recognition ==
Ilse Schwidetzky was member or honorary member in numerous academic associations:

- Permanent Council der International Union of Anthropological and Ethnological Sciences (1974 vice president)
- Akademie der Wissenschaften und der Literatur, Mainz
- Société d’Anthropologie de Paris
- Anthropologische Gesellschaft, Vienna
- Société Royale Belge d’Anthropologie
- Sociedade de Geografia de Lisboa
- Sociedad Española de Antropologia Biologica
- Akademie für Bevölkerungswissenschaft Hamburg
- Herder-Forschungsrat, Marburg
- Deutsche Gesellschaft für Anthropologie und Humangenetik (chair 1968–1970)
- honorary doctorate of the University of Crete (1990)

== Bibliography ==
- Rassenkunde der Altslawen. Stuttgart 1938
- Grundzüge der Völkerbiologie. Stuttgart 1950
- Das Problem des Völkertodes. Eine Studie zur historischen Bevölkerungsbiologie. Enke, Stuttgart 1954
- Das Menschenbild der Biologie Ergebnisse und Probleme der naturwissenschaftlichen Anthropologie. G. Fischer, Stuttgart 1959 (2nd ed. 1970)
- Die vorspanische Bevölkerung der Kanarischen Inseln. Göttingen 1963
- with Hubert Walter: Untersuchungen zur anthropologischen Gliederung Westfalens. Münster 1967
- Hauptprobleme der Anthropologie. Bevölkerungsbiologie und Evolution des Menschen. Rombach, Freiburg i.Br. 1971
- Grundlagen der Rassensystematik. BI, Mannheim 1974
- Rassen und Rassenbildung beim Menschen. Fischer, Stuttgart 1979
- with I. Spiegel-Rösing: Maus und Schlange. Untersuchungen zur Lage der deutschen Anthropologie. Oldenbourg, München 1992

== Literature ==
- Wilhelm Emil Mühlmann: Ilse Schwidetzky zum 65. Geburtstag. In: Homo. 23, 1972, 298–303.
- Wolfram Bernhard, Rainer Knußmann, Friedrich W. Rösing: Ilse Schwidetzky 6.9.1907–18.3.1997. In: Homo. 48, 1997, S. 205–212.
- Wolfram Bernhard: Nachruf auf Ilse Schwidetzky-Rösing (1907–1997). In: Mitteilungen der Anthropologischen Gesellschaft in Wien. 128, 1998, 179–181.
- AG gegen Rassekunde (Hrsg.): Deine Knochen – deine Wirklichkeit. Texte gegen rassistische und sexistische Kontinuität in der Humanbiologie. Hamburg, Münster 1998.
- Veronika Lipphardt: Das „schwarze Schaf“ der Biowissenschaften. Marginalisierungen und Rehabilitierungen der Rassenbiologie im 20. Jahrhundert. In: Dirk Rupnow (Hrsg.): Pseudowissenschaft. Konzeptionen von Nichtwissenschaftlichkeit in der Wissenschaftsgeschichte. Frankfurt am Main 2008, ISBN 978-3-518-29497-0.
