= Theodor Mollison =

German anthropologist (1874–1952)

Theodor Mollison (31 January 1874 – 1 March 1952) was a German physician and anthropologist. He became a professor of anthropology at LMU Munich. He combined medical knowledge with anthropology and was especially interested in physical anthropology and established methods and developed instruments for anatomical measurements and wrote several works on comparative anthropology and primatology. Notably, he was involved in providing scientific support for Nazi racial ideas.

== Biography ==
Mollison was born in Stuttgart to Scottish copper engraver James and his wife Emma from Reutlingen. His father died in 1875, and he was raised in Germany. He studied medicine at Freiburg with a dissertation on scarlet fever in 1898. He then practiced in Frankfurt am Main and in 1902 he went to study under Theodor Boveri in Würzburg. In 1904, he joined an expedition into German East Africa where he collected and described a tree hyrax as Dendrohyrax terricola (now a subspecies of Dendrohyrax validus). He worked at the Anthropological Institute in Zurich from 1905 working under Rudolf Martin. He was habilitated in 1910 with a work on the proportions of primate bodies. In 1918, he joined the University of Wroclaw and succeeded Hermann Klaatsch in 1921. In 1926, he succeeded Martin at LMU Munich and became a director of the anthropological collections in Munich and worked there until his retirement in 1939 but continued as emeritus until 1944.

== Anthropology contributions ==
Mollison developed the idea of a "cerebralization coefficient" to compare apes and in 1933 he wrote on a phylogeny of man (‘Phylogenie des Menschen’) as a festschrift contribution for Rudolf Virchow. Here he used the albumen reactions in serums to examine evolutionary closeness among primates. In 1938, he developed a "serochemical quotient" to determine closeness and suggested the closeness of chimpanzees to humans. Mollison was involved in examination of jaw bones from Kenya brought by Louis Leakey in 1931 to Cambridge. He suggested that the skulls from the Ofnet Cave near Nördlingen showed signs of violent death. Mollison was involved in methods to identify and distinguish racial categories. He developed a method to calculate multivariate deviations around means of a series of univariate trait measurements for two different population measurement. He called this method as the Abweichungskurve [deviation curve]. Joseph Mengele was a doctoral student and Mollison was a supporter of Nazi racial hygiene policies. The Indian anthropologist Achyut Kumar Mitra was also a student of Mollison. He was involved in organizing and exhibition on race anthropology in 1938.
