= John Montgomery Cooper =

American priest, anthropologist and sociologist (1881-1949)

Reverend John Montgomery Cooper
- Professor of Anthropology at the Catholic University of America
- Church: Catholic Church

Orders
- Ordination: 1905

Personal details
- Born: John Montgomery Cooper; October 28, 1881 Rockville, Maryland, U.S.
- Died: May 22, 1949 (aged 67) Washington, D.C., U.S.
- Denomination: Roman Catholic
- Profession: Priest, sociologist, ethnologist
- Education: Pontifical North American College

Ordination history of John Montgomery Cooper
History
Priestly ordination
- Ordained by: ?

John Montgomery Cooper (October 28, 1881 – May 22, 1949) was an American priest, anthropologist, and sociologist. He was a sociology professor at the Catholic University of America and from 1934 to 1949 was chairman of the first Department of Anthropology in a Catholic university. In his anthropological fieldwork, he specialized in studying the Indians of South America and Native Americans of North America.

== Early life ==
John Montgomery Cooper was born on October 28, 1881, in Rockville, Maryland and grew up in the city of Baltimore. He was a descendant of Quaker Christians from England. He received his education at Pontifical North American College and was ordained a priest in 1905, having completed PhD and Doctor of Sacred Theology degrees.

== Career ==
After his ordination to the priesthood in 1905, Cooper received an invitation from the rector of the Catholic University of America to join the Department of Apologetics. Cooper established the Department of Religious Education at the Catholic University of America in 1920. He became an associate professor of sociology in 1923 and gained a professorship in sociology in 1928. From 1934 to 1949, he was chairman of the first Department of Anthropology in a Catholic university.

As an anthropologist, his original fieldwork was in the Tête de Boule of Ottawa. Though Cooper's expertise was in the Indians of South America, he never did fieldwork there; instead, he took research trips to study Native American tribes who spoke Algonquian languages, making several visits to the Great Plains and northeastern Canada. From his studies there, Cooper wrote many articles about Algonquian culture, customs, and religion. Cooper developed the theory that both the South American and North American Indians were "marginal peoples" who were cultural relics from prehistoric times and had been displaced by subsequent migrations into less desirable living areas. He first publicized this theory in his 1941 book Temporal Sequence and the Marginal Cultures.

In a hearing before the United States Senate in 1945, To Permit all people from India residing in the United States to be Naturalized, Cooper recorded that: "The people of India are predominantly Caucasoid. Their features, hair texture, hairiness, the shape of the nose, mouth, and so on, are all distinctly Caucasoid".

Cooper founded the academic journal Primitive Man, which was renamed Anthropological Quarterly in 1953.

== Personal life ==
Cooper died on May 22, 1949, in Washington, D.C.

== Selected works ==
- An Analytical and Critical Bibliography of the Tribes of Tierra del Fuego and Adjacent Territory (1917)
- Religion Outlines for Colleges
- Temporal Sequence and the Marginal Cultures (1941)
- The Gros Ventres of Montana (1957)
