= Nazi racial theories =

Racist foundations of Nazism

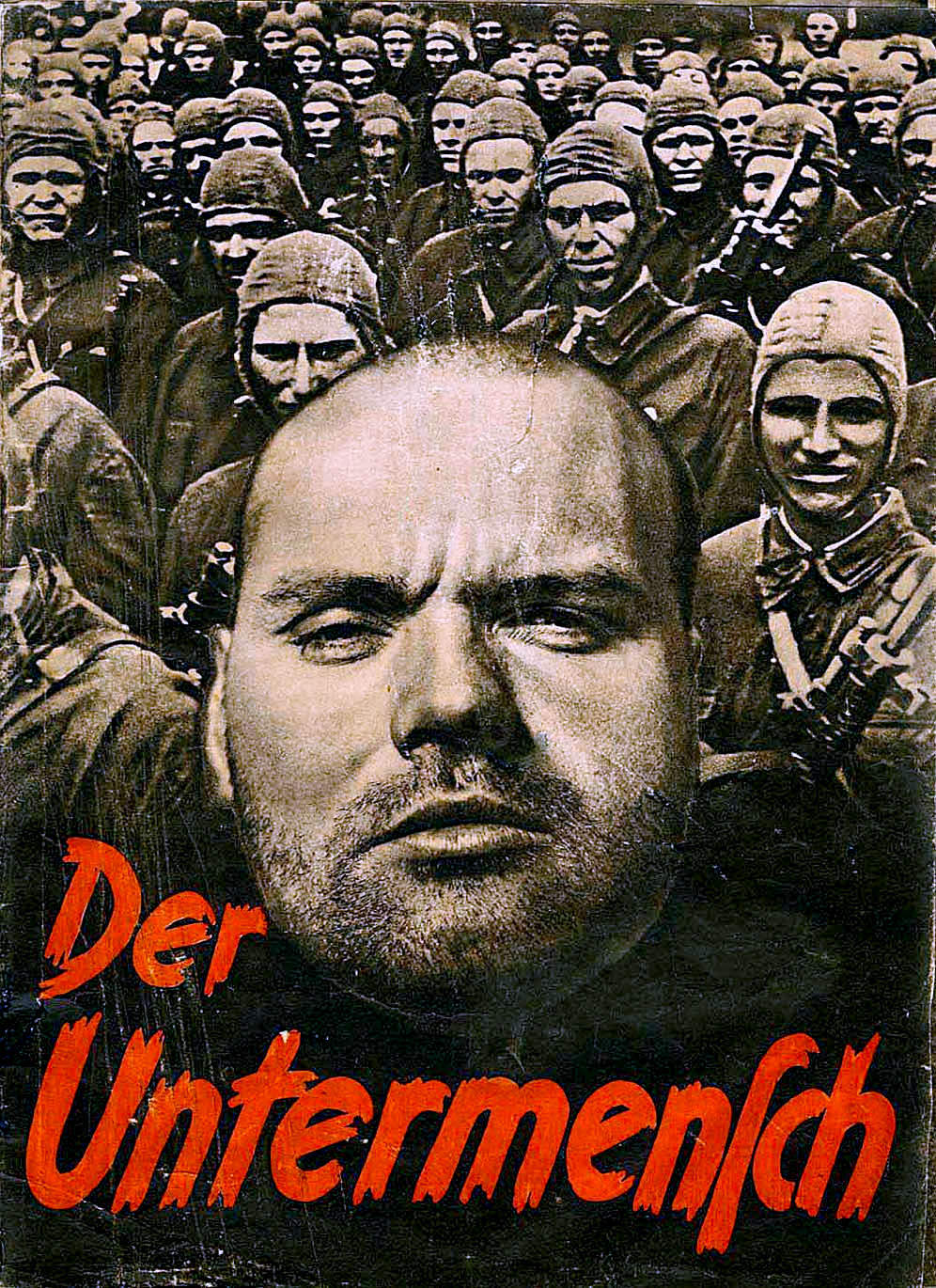
Cover of the Nazi propaganda brochure "Der Untermensch" ("The Subhuman"), 1942. The SS booklet depicted Eastern Europeans as "subhumans".

The German Nazi Party adopted and developed several racial hierarchical categorizations as an important part of its racist ideology (Nazism) in order to justify enslavement, extermination, ethnic persecution and other atrocities against ethnicities which it deemed genetically or culturally inferior. The Aryan race is a pseudoscientific concept that emerged in the late-19th century to describe people who descend from the Proto-Indo-Europeans as a racial grouping, which was accepted by Nazi thinkers. The Nazis considered the putative "Aryan race" to be a superior "master race", with the Nordic-Germanic peoples being considered the best branch of the Aryans. The Nazis considered Jews, mixed-race people, Slavs, Romani, black people, and certain other ethnicities racially inferior subhumans, whose members were only suitable for slave labor and extermination. In these ethnicities, Jews were considered the most inferior. However, the Nazis considered Germanic peoples such as Germans to be significantly mixed between different races, with the East Baltic race being considered inferior by the Nazis, and that their citizens needed to be completely Nordicized after the war. The Nazis also considered certain non-Germanic groups, including the Sorbs, Italians, and Greeks, as being of Germanic and Nordic origin. Some non-Aryan ethnic groups such as the Japanese (semi-officially designated "honorary Aryan") were considered to be partly superior, whereas certain Indo-European peoples such as Slavs, the Romani, and Indians were considered racially inferior.

These beliefs stemmed from a mixture of historical race concepts, 19th-century and early 20th century anthropology, 19th-century and early 20th-century biology, racial biology, white supremacism, notions of Aryan racial superiority, Nordicism, social Darwinism, German nationalism, and antisemitism with the selection of the most extreme parts. They also originated from German military alliance needs. The term Aryan generally originated during the discourses about the use of the term Volk (the people constitute a lineage group whose members share a territory, a language, and a culture). Unlike the German armed forces (Wehrmacht) only used for military conflicts, the Schutzstaffel (SS) was a paramilitary organization directly controlled by the Nazis with absolute compliance with Nazi racial ideology and policies.

== Racial hierarchy ==
The Adolf Hitler-led Nazis claimed to observe a strict and scientific hierarchy of the human race. Hitler's views on race and people are found throughout his autobiographical manifesto Mein Kampf but more specifically, they are found in chapter 11, the title of which is "Nation and Race". The standard-issue propaganda text which was issued to members of the Hitler Youth contained a chapter on "The German Races" that heavily cited the works of Hans F. K. Günther. The text seems to categorize the European races in descending orders in the Nazi racial hierarchy: the Nordic (including the Phalic sub-race, a subgroup of the Nordic race), Mediterranean, Dinaric, Alpine, and East Baltic races. In 1937, Hitler spoke in the Reichstag and declared, "I speak prophetically. Just as the discovery that the earth moved around the sun led to a complete transformation of the way people looked at the world, so too the blood and racial teachings of National Socialism will change our understanding of mankind's past and its future."

=== Highest Aryans: Germanic and Nordic ===
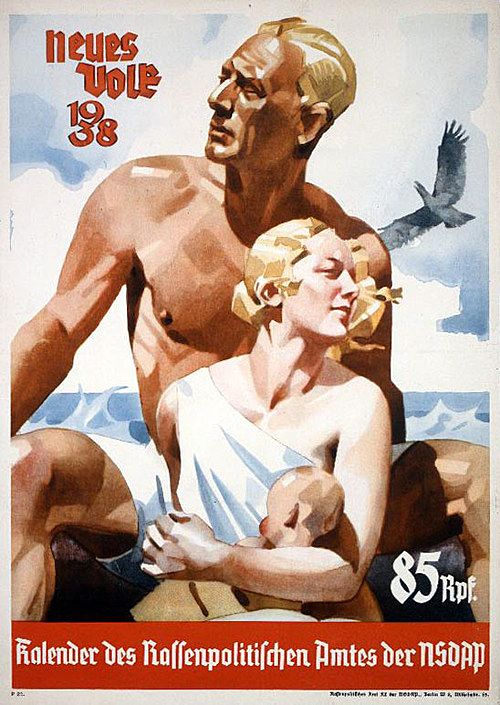
A poster advertising the 1938 Neues Volk calendar depicting racially "pure Aryans"

In his speeches and writings, Hitler referred to the supposed existence of an Aryan race, a race that he believed founded a superior type of humanity. According to Nazi ideology, the purest stock of Aryans were the Nordic people of Germany, England, the Netherlands, and Scandinavia. The Nazis defined Nordics as being identified by their tall stature (average 175 cm [5 ft 9 in]), their long faces, their prominent chins, their narrow and straight or aquiline noses with a high base, their lean builds, their dolichocephalic skulls, their straight and light hair, their light eyes, and their fair skin. The Nazis regarded the Germans as well as the English, Danes, Norwegians, and Swedes as the most racially pure in Europe. Indeed, members of the Schutzstaffel (SS) considered Aryans not to be of a single ethnic group, and did not have to be exclusively German, but instead could be selected from populations across Europe to create the "master race". The normative German term for them was that there existed an arisches Volk (Aryan people), not arische Rasse (Aryan race).

The Nazis believed that the Germanic peoples of Northwestern Europe belonged to a racially superior Nordic subset of the larger Aryan race, who were regarded as the only true culture-bearers in civilized society. 'Aryan' world history became the link between East and West, also between the Old World and New World. The principal dogma, in this Nazi historiography, was that the glories of all human civilizations were creations of the 'Aryan' master race, a culture-bearing race. The Nordic (Germanic) Aryans did not develop into great civilizations in ancient history because they lived in the cold, damp, and harsh environment for a long time. However, they kept their purity intact and later only the Germanic Aryans at the end of history would eventually conquer and dominate the world because of their purity was maintained, being proved during the Germanic domain of Industrial Revolution (the Slavs later mixed with Asiatic peoples during the Middle Ages and lost their racial purity and superior talent).

The Nazis claimed that the Germanic peoples specifically represented a southern branch of the Aryan-Nordic population. The Nazis considered that the Nordic race was the most prominent race of the German people, but that there were other sub-races that were commonly found amongst the German people such as the Alpine race population who were identified by, among other features, their lower stature, their stocky builds, their flatter noses, and their higher incidences of darker hair and eyes. Hitler and the leading Nazi racial theorist Hans F. K. Günther framed this as an issue which would be corrected through the selective breeding of "Nordic" traits. In general terms, Günther diagnosed combinations of the following elements in the German Volk: Nordic (nordisch); Mediterranean (westisch, mediterran, mittelländisch); Dinaric (dinarisch); Alpine (ostisch, alpin); East Baltic (ostbaltisch); Phalian (fälisch, dalisch). These theories generated some fear in southern Germans, as they thought that Nazism was a form of "Nordic colonialism" and that non-Nordics would be treated as second-class citizens.

Nonetheless, Hitler stated "the principal ingredient of our people is the Nordic race (55%). That is not to say that half our people are pure Nordics. All of the aforementioned races appear in mixtures in all parts of our fatherland. The circumstance, however, that the great part of our people is of Nordic descent justifies us taking a Nordic standpoint when evaluating our character and spirit, bodily structure, and physical beauty." Nazis were also tolerant of native Germans who did not possess the physical appearance of the Nordic race as long as they shared the traits of being a "German" which were "courage, loyalty and honor".

In the 1920s, the Reichsführer-SS Heinrich Himmler came under the influence of Richard Walther Darré, who was a leading proponent of the blood and soil concept. Darré strongly believed that the Nordic race was racially superior to all other races and he also strongly believed that the German peasants would play a fundamental role in securing Germany's future and Germany's future expansion in Eastern Europe, and in the racial strength of the German people.

Germans wishing to obtain Reich citizenship had to obtain an Aryan certificate, which was typically done by providing proof that their four grandparents were of Aryan descent and obtaining an Ahnenpass (ancestor’s pass). According to the document:

National Socialist thought grants full equity to every other Volk and, moreover never speaks of superior or inferior, but rather only of alien racial admixture.

Himmler required all SS candidates to undergo a racial screening and he forbade any German who had Slavic, Negroid or Jewish racial features from joining the Schutzstaffel (SS). Applicants had to provide proof that they had only Aryan-Germanic ancestors back to 1800 (1750 for officers).

Although Himmler endorsed occultism with his racial theories, Hitler did not and at Nuremberg on 6 September 1938, he declared:

National Socialism is not a cult-movement – a movement for worship; it is exclusively a 'volkic' political doctrine based upon racial principles. In its purpose there is no mystic cult, only the care and leadership of a people defined by a common blood-relationship. Therefore we have no rooms for worship, but only halls for the people – no open spaces for worship, but spaces for assemblies and parades. We have no religious retreats, but arenas for sports and playing-fields, and the characteristic feature of our places of assembly is not the mystical gloom of a cathedral, but the brightness and light of a room or hall which combines beauty with fitness for its purpose. In these halls no acts of worship are celebrated, they are exclusively devoted to gatherings of the people of the kind which we have come to know in the course of our long struggle; to such gatherings we have become accustomed and we wish to maintain them. We will not allow mystically-minded occult folk with a passion for exploring the secrets of the world beyond to steal into our Movement. Such folk are not National Socialists, but something else – in any case, something which has nothing to do with us. At the head of our program there stand no secret surmisings but clear-cut perception and straightforward profession of belief. But since we set as the central point of this perception and of this profession of belief the maintenance and hence the security for the future of a being formed by God, we thus serve the maintenance of a divine work and fulfill a divine will – not in the secret twilight of a new house of worship, but openly before the face of the Lord.

In February 1940, Himmler said the following during a secret meeting with Gauleiters, "We are firmly convinced, I believe it, just as I believe in a God, I believe that our blood, the Nordic blood, is actually the best blood on this earth... In a thousand centuries this Nordic blood will still be the best. There is no other. We are superior to everything and everyone. Once we are liberated from inhibitions and restraints, there is no one who can surpass us in quality and strength."

In private in 1942, Hitler stated, "I shall have no peace of mind until I have planted a seed of Nordic blood wherever the population stand in need of regeneration. If at the time of the migrations, while the great racial currents were exercising their influence, our people received so varied a share of attributes, these latter blossomed to their full value only because of the presence of the Nordic racial nucleus."

The matter of satisfactorily defining who precisely was an "Aryan" (Note: The term Aryan was replaced with the term German or related blood in the text of the Nuremberg Laws and in most other documents thereafter.) remained problematic for the duration of Nazi rule. In 1933, a definition of "Aryan" according to the Nazi official Albert Gorter for the Civil Service Law stated:

The Aryans (also Indo-Germans, Japhetiten) are one of the three branches of the Caucasian (white race); they are divided into the western (European), that is the German, Roman, Greek, Slav, Lett, Celt [and] Albanesen, and the eastern (Asiatic) Aryans, that is the Indian (Hindu) and Iranian (Persian, Afghan, Armenian, Georgian, Kurd). Non-Aryans are therefore: 1. the members of two other races, namely the Mongolian (yellow) and the Negroid (black) races; 2. the members of the two other branches of the Caucasian race, namely the Semites (Jews, Arabs) and Hamites (Egyptians). The Finns and the Hungarians belong to the Mongoloid race; but it is hardly the intention of the law to treat them as non-Aryans. Thus ... the non-Jewish members of the European Volk are Aryans...

That definition of "Aryan" was deemed unacceptable by the Nazis because it included members of certain non-European ethnic groups; therefore, the Expert Advisor for Population and Racial Policy redefined an "Aryan" as someone who was "tribally" related to "German blood". The term "Aryan" was also used in Nazi propaganda in a racial sense. However, the leading Nazi racial theorist Hans F. K. Günther regarded the term "Aryan" as "unscientific" and did not believe in the existence of a unified Aryan race. For him, this was a term used by the linguists. Instead, Günther spoke of races that have varying degrees of racial affinity with one another based on ancient Nordic migrations across Europe and parts of Asia. In continuing to use the term "Aryan", the Nazis took Günther's ideas and effectively used the term "Aryan" as a synonym for those who were "racially related" to Germans within their racial policies.

In June 1935, Nazi politician and Reich Minister of the Interior Wilhelm Frick argued that "non-Aryan" should have been replaced with "Jewish" and "of foreign origin". His recommendation was rejected. Frick then commented, "'Aryan' and 'non-Aryan' are sometimes not entirely tenable... From a racial political point, it is Judaism that interests us more than anything else."

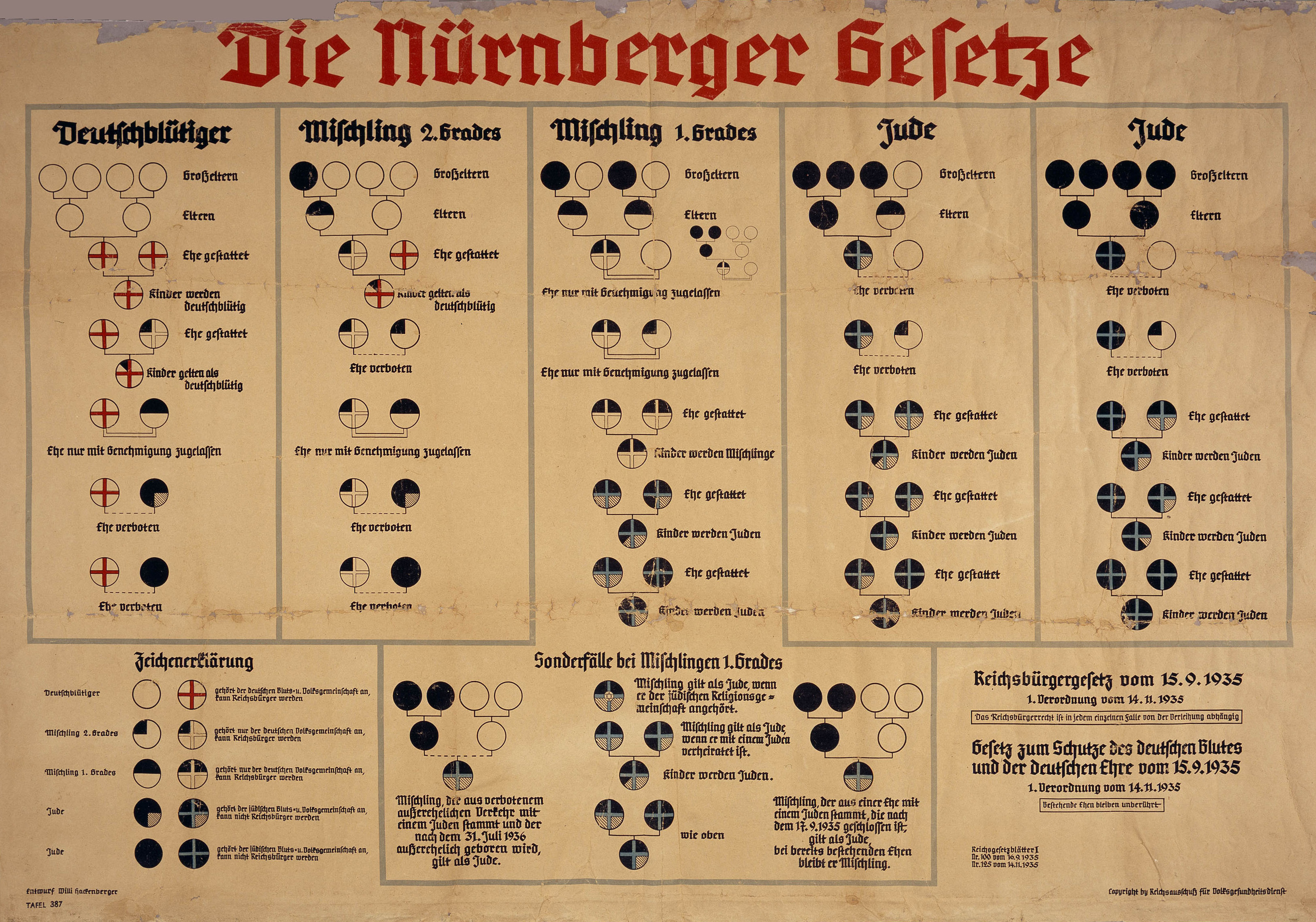
A chart in 1935 explaining the Nuremberg Laws

After the Nuremberg Laws (Law for the Protection of German Blood and German Honour and The Reich Citizenship Law) were passed in September 1935, Nazi Party lawyer and State Secretary in the Reich Interior Ministry Wilhelm Stuckart defined "related blood" (artverwandtes Blut) as:

So, when we speak of related blood, we mean the blood of those races that are determinative for the blood of the peoples who since time immemorial have a closed settlement area in Europe. Therefore, the members of the European peoples as well as their pure descendants in other parts of the world are essentially of related blood. However, one has to exclude the foreign-blooded, who can be found among every European people, such as the Jews and the human beings with a Negroid blood-impact.

Dr. Ernst Brandis, a legal bureaucrat, who made an official comment about the Law for the Protection of German Blood and German Honour and the Law for the Protection of the Hereditary Health of the German people on 18 October 1935, defined "German blood" as:

The German people is no unitary race, rather it is composed of members of different races (of the Nordic, Phalian, Dinaric, Alpine, Mediterranean, East-Elbian race) and mixtures between these. The blood of all these races and their mixtures, which thus is found in the German people, represents 'German blood'.

Frick on 3 January 1936 commented about the Nuremberg Laws and defined "related blood" as:

Since German blood is a prerequisite for Reich citizenship, no Jew can become a Reich citizen. But the same applies to the members of other races whose blood is not related to German blood, e.g. for Gypsies and Negroes. According to § 6 of the first implementation regulation for the Blood Protection Act, a marriage should not be contracted if offspring endangering the purity of German blood is to be expected from it. This provision prevents marriages between people of German blood and such persons who do not have any Jewish blood, but are otherwise of alien blood. The alien breeds in Europe, apart from the Jews, normally only includes the gypsies.

Stuckart and Hans Globke in 1936 published the Civil Rights and the Natural Inequality of Man and wrote about the Nuremberg Laws and Reich citizenship:

A member of any minority group demonstrates his ability to serve the German Reich when, without surrendering membership in his own specific Volk group, he loyally carries out his civil duties to the Reich, such as service in the armed forces, etc. Reich citizenship is, therefore, open to racially related groups living in Germany, such as Poles, Danes, and others. It is an altogether different matter with German nationals of alien blood and race. They do not fulfill the blood prerequisites for Reich citizenship. The Jews, who constitute an alien body among all European peoples, are especially characterized by racial foreignness. Jews, therefore, cannot be seen as being fit for service to the German Volk and Reich. Hence, they must necessarily remain excluded from Reich citizenship.

The Nuremberg Laws criminalized sexual relations and marriages between people of "German or related blood" and Jews, blacks and Gypsies as Rassenschande (race defilement).

In 1938, a brochure for the Nuremberg Party Rally included all Indo-European peoples as being of "related blood" to the Germans:

Central and Northern Europe are the homeland of the Nordic race. At the beginning of the most recent Ice Age, around 5,000 BC, a Nordic-Indogermanic Urvolk of the Nordic race [artgleicher nordrassischer Menschen] existed, with the same language and unified mode of behavior [Gesittung], which divided into smaller and larger groups as it expanded. From these went forth Germans, Celts, Romans, Greeks, Slavs, Persians, and Aryan Indians... The original racial unity and common ownership of the most important cultural artifacts remained for thousands of years the cement holding together the Western peoples.

However, soon after the invasion of Poland in 1939, the Nazis decided to relegate the Slavs to a non-European status:

The German people were the only bearers of culture in the East and in their role as the main power of Europe protected Western culture and carried it into uncultivated regions. For centuries they constituted a barrier in the East against lack of culture (Unkultur) and protected the West against barbarity. They protected the borders from Slavs, Avars, and Magyars.

In 1942, Himmler redefined the term "related" which until that year had referred to non-German European nations as follows: "that the racial structure of all European nations is so closely related to that of the German nation that if interbreeding occurs there is no danger that the German nation's blood will be racially contaminated". The term "related" was defined, firstly, as "German blood and blood of related Germanic races" (to which members of "non-Germanic" nations were only included insofar as they were capable of being Germanised), and secondly, "related blood but not from related races", by which Himmler meant all the non-Germanic European nations (Slavs, Latins, Celts, and Balts). According to historian Peter Longerich, this two-tiered definition was created to later exclude the second category from having sexual relations with Germans: this was Himmler's strategy of preparing the way for a future ban on sexual relations between Germanics and those of Latin, Baltic, or Celtic origins. Slavs had already been formally banned from having sexual relations with Germans, by this point.

Jews, Romani, and black people were not considered Aryans by Nazi Germany. Instead, they were considered subhuman and inferior races.

=== East Asians ===
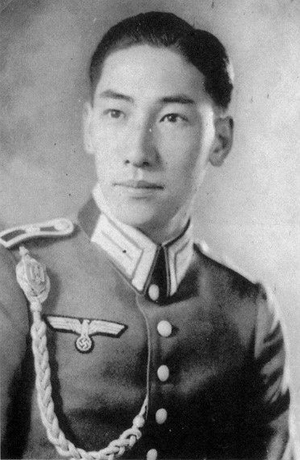
Chinese Chiang Wei-kuo as a Wehrmacht officer candidate (Fahnenjunker), c. 1938. The shoulder boards indicate the rank of Unterfeldwebel (OR5a) with marksmanship.

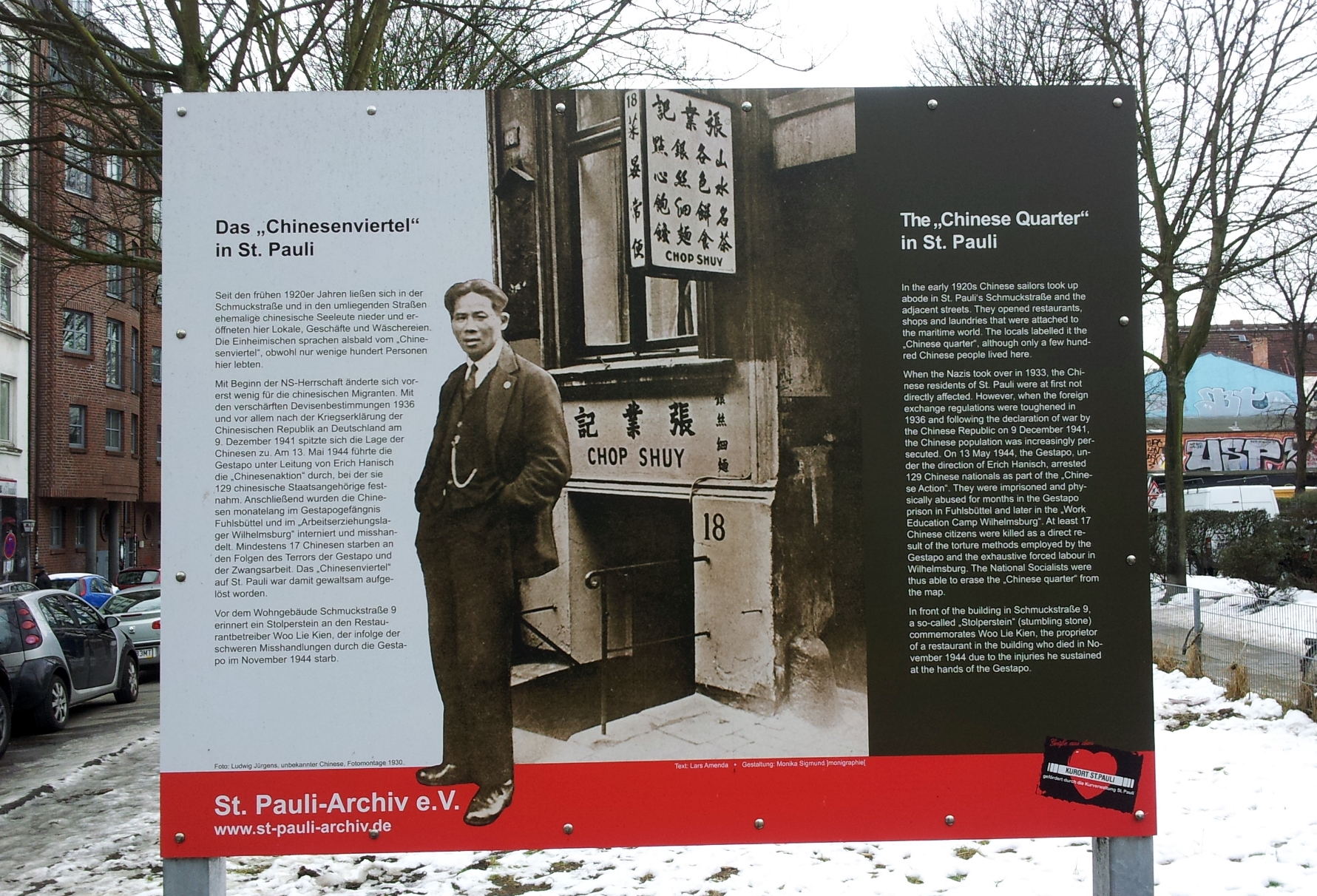
A memorial plaque on Schmuckstraße in Hamburg provides a brief history of the Chinese quarters in St. Pauli and its destruction by the Gestapo in 1944.

In Mein Kampf, Hitler expressed his praise for the Japanese's acceptance of European civilization and his contempt for the Chinese:

The foundation of actual life is no longer the special Japanese culture, although it determines the color of life-because outwardly, in consequence of its inner difference, it is more conspicuous to the European-but the gigantic scientific-technical achievements of Europe and America; that is, of Aryan peoples. Only on the basis of these achievements can the Orient follow general human progress. They furnish the basis of the struggle for daily bread, create weapons and implements for it, and only the outward form is gradually adapted to Japanese character.

What they mostly meant by Germanization was a process of forcing other people to speak the German language. But it is almost inconceivable how such a mistake could be made as to think that a Negro or a Chinaman will become a German because he has learned the German language and is willing to speak German for the future, and even to cast his vote for a German political party.

The Nazi government began to enact racial laws after Hitler came to power in 1933, and during that year, the Japanese government protested against several racial incidents which involved Japanese or Japanese-Germans. Later, the disputes were resolved when the Nazi high command treated its Japanese allies leniently. This was especially the case after the collapse of Sino-German cooperation and the formation of the official alliance between Germany and Japan.

Chinese were subjected to discrimination under Germany's racial laws which—with the exception of the 1935 Nuremberg Laws, which specifically mentioned Jews—were generally applied to all non-Aryans. However, Japanese people were considered "Honorary Aryans".

After the Nationalist government of China declared war on Germany and joined the Allies in December 1941, Chinese nationals were persecuted in Germany. However, before, in July 1941, Germany officially recognised Wang Jingwei's puppet government after negotiations by its Foreign Minister Chu Minyi, and both were members of the Axis. The influential Nazi anti-Semite Johann von Leers favored the exclusion of Japanese people from the laws because he believed in the existence of the alleged Japanese-Aryan racial link and because he sought to improve Germany's diplomatic relations with Japan. The Foreign Ministry supported von Leers and on several occasions between 1934 and 1937, it sought to change the laws, but other government agencies, including the Racial Policy Office, opposed the change.

An October 1933 statement by Foreign Minister Konstantin von Neurath which was published in response to the Japanese protests falsely claimed that Japanese were exempt. The wide publication of this statement caused many in Germany, Japan, and elsewhere to believe that such an exemption actually existed. Instead of granting Japanese a broad exemption from the laws, an April 1935 decree stated that any racial discrimination cases that might jeopardize German diplomatic relations because they involved non-Aryans—i.e., Japanese—would be dealt with individually. Decisions on such cases often took years to make, and those people who were affected by them were unable to obtain jobs or interracially marry, primarily because the German government preferred to avoid exempting people from the laws as much as possible. The German government often exempted more German-Japanese than it preferred to because it wanted to avoid a repeat of the 1933 controversies; in 1934, the government prohibited the German press from discussing the race laws with regard to Japanese. During World War II, Hitler privately expressed fears concerning the replacement of "white rule" in Asia (that of European colonial powers) with "yellow" supremacy as a result of Japanese conquests. In early 1942, Hitler is quoted as saying to Joachim von Ribbentrop: "We have to think in terms of centuries. Sooner or later there will have to be a showdown between the white and the yellow races."

=== Uralic Aryans ===
The Nazis in an attempt to find a satisfactory definition of "Aryan" were faced with a dilemma with regard to the European peoples who did not speak an Indo-European language or Indo-Aryan language, namely Estonians, Finns, and Hungarians.

The first legal attempt was in 1933 for the Civil Service Law, when a definition of "Aryan" was given by Albert Gorter for the Civil Service Law that included the Uralic peoples as Aryans. However, that definition was deemed unacceptable because it included some non-European peoples. Gorter changed the definition of 'Aryan' to the definition that was given by the Expert Advisor for Population and Racial Policy (Sachverständigenbeirat für Bevölkerungs- und Rassenpolitik) which was, "An Aryan is one who is tribally related (stammverwandt) to German blood. An Aryan is the descendant of a Volk domiciled in Europe in a closed tribal settlement (Volkstumssiedlung) since recorded history". That definition of 'Aryan' included Estonians, Finns and Hungarians. In 1938, a commentary was made about the Nuremberg Laws that proclaimed that "the overwhelming majority" of Finns and Hungarians were of Aryan blood.

==== Estonians ====
In 1941, Nazi Germany established the Reichskommissariat Ostland in order to administer the conquered territory of Estonia. The colonial department in Berlin under Minister Alfred Rosenberg (born in Tallinn in 1893) favorably looked upon Estonians as Finno-Ugrics and thus, it looked upon them as "Aryans". Generalkommissar Karl-Siegmund Litzmann authorized the establishment of a Landeseigene Verwaltung, or a local national administration.

During the war, Hitler remarked that Estonians contained a lot of "Germanic blood". Of the Baltic peoples, Estonians were seen by the Nazis as closest to German Aryanism, more than Latvians with their Russian percentages, and more than Lithuanians who were judged too Jewish and too Russian. Estonians were favorably seen as Aryan "Finno-Ugrics" by the Nazis. Estonians were hence viewed as being more Nordic racially.

==== Finns ====
The Finns had a debatable position in the Nazi racial theories, as they were considered a part of the "Eastern Mongol race" with the Sámi people in traditional racial hierarchies. Finland did not have Lebensborn centres, unlike Norway, although Finland had tens of thousands of German soldiers in the country. Archival research however has found out that 26 Finnish women were in contact with the Lebensborn program for unspecified reasons.

After Germany invaded the Soviet Union in June 1941, the Finnish army, alongside German units in Lapland, invaded the USSR following Soviet air attacks on Finnish cities. Finland fought the USSR primarily in order to recover the territories which it was forced to cede to the USSR after the Moscow Peace Treaty which ended the Winter War between the Finns and the Soviets. In November 1942, owing to Finland's substantial military contribution to the German war effort on the northern flank of the Eastern Front of World War II, Hitler decreed that "from now on Finland and the Finnish people be treated and designated as a Nordic state and a Nordic people", which he considered one of the highest compliments that the Nazi government could bestow upon another country. Hitler stated in private conversation that:

After their first conflict with the Russians, the Finns applied to me, proposing that their country should become a German protectorate. I don't regret having rejected this offer. As a matter of fact, the heroic attitude of this people, which has spent a hundred of the six hundred years of its history in fighting, deserves the greatest respect. It is infinitely better to have this people of heroes as allies than to incorporate it in the Germanic Reich—which, in any case, would not fail to provoke complications in the long run. The Finns cover one of our flanks, Turkey covers the other. That's an ideal solution for me as far as our political protective system is concerned.

==== Hungarians ====
According to the Interior Ministry, Hungarians were "tribally alien" (fremdstämmig) but were not necessarily "blood alien", which added to even more confusion with regard to defining Hungarians on a racial basis. In 1934, a brochure from the series Family, Race, Volk in the National Socialist State simply stated that Hungarians (which it did not define) were Aryans. But, the following year an article in the Journal for Racial Science on the "Racial Diagnosis of the Hungarians", remarked that "opinions on the racial condition of the Hungarians are still very divided". There were two major schools of thought regarding the racial composition of Hungarians: "pure Hungarians" were either primarily "Asiatic" or primarily Alpine. As late as 1943, the question of whether a Hungarian woman was to be allowed to marry a German man was disputed. Four different Nazi agencies became involved in this case, in attempting to determine whether this Hungarian woman was of "German or related blood" (Aryan). In November 1940, a decree from Rudolf Hess, as the Deputy Führer of the Nazi Party, stated that no party member or member of a party organization was permitted to marry a person who had at least two grandparents who were Magyars without the permission of their respective Gauleiter. Hitler believed that the Hungarian aristocracy has "predominantly German blood in its veins." As a whole, however, Hitler viewed Hungarians as being the "sickest" people in Europe.

=== Western Aryans ===
Although Günther and Hitler viewed Western nations as Aryans, they held dismissive racial views about the lower classes in Britain and France.

==== British and Irish ====
According to Günther, the purest Nordic regions were Scandinavia and northern Germany, particularly Norway and Sweden, specifying: "We may, perhaps, take the Swedish blood to be over 80 per cent Nordic, the Norwegian blood about 80 per cent." Britain and southern Germany by contrast were not considered entirely Nordic. Germany was said to be 55% Nordic, and the rest Alpine (particularly southern Germany), Dinaric, or East Baltic (particularly eastern Germany). On the British Isles, Günther stated: "we may adopt the following racial proportions for these islands: Nordic blood, 60 percent; Mediterranean, 30 percent; Alpine, 10 percent." He added that "The Nordic strain in Germany seems to be rather more distributed over the whole people than in England, where it seems to belong far more to the upper classes." Hitler echoed this sentiment, referring to the British lower classes as "racially inferior".

Günther claimed that the Anglo-Saxons had been more successful than the Germans in maintaining racial purity and had been infused with additional Nordic blood through Norse raids and colonization during the Viking Age. Günther referred to this process as Aufnordung ("additional nordification"), which finally culminated in the Norman Conquest. Britain was thus a nation created by struggle and the survival of the fittest among the various Aryan peoples of the isles, and Britain's global conquest and empire-building was a result of its superior racial heredity. Hitler's admiration of the British empire was on the same track. For the Nazis, the ruthless British attitude in the English people was an example of what was needed for a master race to rule over large, inferior, masses of people. Britain's role as a world power, colonial empire, and an agent of international politics was admired by Nazis as a quality of their superiority. Hitler and many others in Germany were convinced that brutality in the colonies and in war was a key feature of the British national character.

Hitler seems to have lumped all the peoples (English, Scots, Welsh, and Irish) of the British Isles in together, viewing them collectively rather than distinguishing among them. This contradicted many British and American racial theorists, especially from the Victorian era who believed Irish Catholics (and sometimes Celts as a whole) were less evolved as subhuman nonwhite others (some of those tropes were also repeated by the Imperial Fascist League). These beliefs were also reflected in magazines such as Punch who portrayed the Irish as "bestial" or "ape-like". Subsequently some Irish nationalists tried to turn this theory around to claim that Celts had greater spiritual and cultural capacity than the plodding Anglo-Saxon shopkeepers. A big plus, in Nazi eyes, about the Celts was that, living in the far west of Europe in Ireland, Brittany etc., they were less 'contaminated' by 'inferior' East European or Jewish blood than people in the middle of Europe. However, some Nazi theories claimed that the Irish were close to the Mediterranean peoples, which made them inferior to the more Nordic English.

Up until November 1938 when Anglo-German relations started to deteriorate, Hitler had viewed the British on the whole as fellow Aryans and saw the British Empire as a potential German ally. However, the subsequent deterioration of relations and the outbreak of World War II led Nazi propaganda to portray the British establishment as a racially degenerate for supposedly allowing thousands of Jews to immigrate to the United Kingdom, intermarry with the upper class and dominate British foreign policy. A 1944 article described Winston Churchill as a "slave of the Jews and of alcohol". Nazi propaganda also vilified the British as oppressive and hating plutocrats with materialistic tendencies who were an existential threat to the world, as they were the creators of "international high finance" and the degeneracy of capitalism.

==== French ====
Hitler viewed the French as close to the Germans racially, but not quite their peers. He said of their racial character: "France remains hostile to us. She contains, in addition to her Nordic blood, a blood that will always be foreign to us." Günther echoed this sentiment, saying that the French were predominantly Alpine and Mediterranean rather than Nordic, but that a heavy Nordic strain was still present. He characterized the French as possessing the following racial proportions: Nordic, 25%; Alpine or Dinaric, 50%; Mediterranean, 25%. These types were said to be most prevalent in north, central, and southern France respectively.

Hitler planned to remove a large portion of the French population to make way for German settlement. The zone interdite of eastern France was set aside and planned to be made part of the German Reich after the rest of France was fully subdued. The French residents of the zone, some 7 million people accounting for nearly 20% of the French population at the time, were to be deported, and the land then occupied by at least a million German settlers. The plan was either postponed or abandoned after Operation Barbarossa in favor of expediting the settlement of the east instead and was never put into place owing to the German defeat in the Second World War.

=== Mediterranean Aryans ===
Nazi propaganda described the Mediterranean race as brown-haired, brown-eyed, light skinned but slightly darker than their Northern European counterparts, and short (average 1.62 m [5 ft 4 in]), with dolichocephalic or mesocephalic skulls, and lean builds. People who fit this category were described as "lively, even loquacious" and "excitable, even passionate", but they were also described as being "prone to act more on feeling than on reason", and as a result, "this race has produced only a few outstanding men".

For the Nazis, in the beginning there were two types of Aryans: one was predominantly red or blonde haired and blue-eyed (Germanic Aryans); while the other was predominantly dark eyed and dark haired (Mediterranean Aryans). Blond, red hair, and dark hair were common among both kinds of Aryans but one predominated over the other. The dark-haired (Mediterranean) Aryans migrated to Southern Europe and in that environment supposedly released their superior talent in the arts, philosophy, and government. This was attributed primarily to the favorable conditions of the Mediterranean. The Nazis believed this explained why the Greeks and Romans created what they considered the greatest civilizations known to man. They also believed that the ancient Greeks and Romans were the racial ancestors of the Germans, and the first torchbearers of "Nordic–Greek" art and culture. Later, the Mediterranean Aryans in Spain, France, and Italy were said to have committed the great sin of mixing with other populations (mainly Semitic, Celtic, and North African) who were brought by the Greeks and Romans into their empires and during the Moorish invasions.

==== Italians ====
Nazi racial theorists questioned the amount of Nordic-Aryan blood Italians had. Hitler himself viewed northern Italians as more Aryan than southern Italians. The Nazis viewed the downfall of the Roman Empire as being caused by racial intermixing, claiming that Italians were a hybrid of races, including black African races. When Hitler met Italian fascist leader Benito Mussolini in June 1934 he told him that all Mediterranean peoples were "tainted" by Negro blood. Hitler viewed Italians as being the second "sickest" community in Europe, after Hungarians.

According to Hitler, Germans are more closely linked with the Italians than with any other people:

From the cultural point of view, we are more closely linked with the Italians than with any other people. The art of Northern Italy is something we have in common with them: nothing but pure Germans. The objectionable Italian type is found only in the South, and not everywhere even there. We also have this type in our own country. When I think of them: Vienna-Ottakring, Munich-Giesing, Berlin-Pankow! If I compare the two types, that of these degenerate Italians and our type, I find it very difficult to say which of the two is the more antipathetic.

Despite their weaknesses, the Italians have so many qualities that make us like them. Italy is the country where intelligence created the notion of the State. The Roman Empire is a great political creation, the greatest of all. The Italian's people musical sense, its liking for harmonious proportions, the beauty of its race! The Renaissance was the dawn of a new era, in which Aryan man found himself anew. There's also our own past on Italian soil.

==== Greeks ====
During a speech in 1920, Hitler claimed that Greek civilization descended from Aryans. In his unpublished Second Book in 1928, he wrote that Sparta must be regarded as the first Völkisch state. Similarly, during a speech in August 1929 he reiterated the same thought by stating that Sparta was the "purest racial state" in history. Hitler believed that the ancient Greeks were Germanic. He wrote that "When we are asked about our ancestors, we should always point to the Greeks". According to historian Johann Chapoutot, Hitler appropriated Greco-Roman heritage to hide Germany's humiliating past of "barbarity and backwardness".

Alfred Rosenberg wrote in The Myth of The Twentieth Century that the civilisation of ancient Greece was the result of an "Aryan-Greek race soul". But in the later classical period, Greeks heavily intermixed with non-Greeks. In this regard, according to Rosenberg, the original Nordic-Aryan Greeks degenerated through racial intermixing with a variety of populations, leading to their "denordification". According to him, this intermixing began at classical times. He "considered the polarity between Apollo and Dionysus to be a consequence of the racial and spiritual schizophrenia of the Greeks, who were torn between faithfulness to their Nordic roots and an upwelling of nonnative peoples that had insinuated itself into their blood after their emigration south: ‘The Greek was always divided within himself and vacillated between his own natural values and those of alien and exotic originʼ". Hans F. K. Günther had similar racial views, claiming that ancient Greeks were a Nordic-Mediterranean-Dinaric-Hither Asiatic mixture but dominated by a Nordic ruling class. Alexander the Great is provided as an example of a Nordic ruler, in Günther's theory. However, according to Günther, because of racial mixing modern Greeks have become "marked by a Mediterranean-Hither Asiatic-Dinaric-Oriental mixture" with Nordic blood only being found occasionally.

In 1938, Rosenberg wrote a preface to the book Unsterbliches Hellas, a joint German-Greek project which talked about "primordial Hellenism" and sought to prove the supposed "Graeco-German racial relationship" and emphasized the racial continuity of the Greeks. Himmler instructed the people carrying out Ahnenerbe think tank to study the "Indo-Germanic and Aryan" origins of Greece. A 1939 article by Tito Körner in the Nazi magazine Volk Und Rasse compared the Greeks of Laconia, with the Greeks of Attica. According to the article, "in the land of the old Indo-Germanic Sparta", "blond hair, blue eyes, and tall height are common", while the Athenians were just a "people of mixed race". Körner believed that the former were directly the "descendants of the ancient Greeks". A 1941 article by Roland Hampe in the same magazine, stated that "nothing could be more false than to say that the Greek people as a whole have been Balkanized. Curiously, we tend to hold the Greek people to a higher racial standard than we do other people", arguing that the Greeks displayed a mental disposition that tended to indicate a common racial descent with those from northern Europe: "An unconscious recollection of their Nordic roots from deepest antiquity seems to reverberate through the veins of the Greek people". Thus, according to Chapoutot, the Nazis invaded Greece so they could introduce more Nordic blood into the native population and usher their renordification:

Their roots, still visible in the two racial types described in the article of 1939, demonstrated that the recovery of the Greek body through rejuvenation by Nordic blood was still possible: after Turkish, French, and English domination, Greece found itself as a result of the Germans' invasion "finally included in the circulatory system of European blood". Once again, Greece had been resuscitated by a wave of Nordic migration and an injection of its pure, fresh blood. The three prehistoric and ancient waves of migration had been joined by a fourth: that of the Reich triumphant.

During the Italian invasion of Greece in 1940, Hitler "rather admired the Greeks, and expected them to resist successfully". Rosenberg noted in his diary that Hitler "is very sorry that he has to fight with the Greeks". In a letter to Arno Breker's Greek wife, Demetra Messala, Hitler wrote:

Dear Mrs Breker, I have been thinking of you a lot lately and regretting the political entanglements with Greece. You cannot imagine how difficult it was for me to fight against your home country. It was the hardest battle that the German Wehrmacht had to face in this war so far. Your brothers fought like the heroes of ancient Hellas and, with you in mind, following the cessation of military action, I gave the order to immediately return all soldiers to their families in freedom, with the exception of the officers' corps, whose political stance towards Germany raises certain questions.

During the Axis occupation of Greece, it was German policy to discourage relationships between German servicemen and Greek women due to concerns of damaging German "racial purity" through miscegenation. Regarding atrocities against Greeks during the occupation, General Hubert Lanz wrote retrospectively: "The Germans harbored no hatred against the Greeks... On the contrary, they admired the great past and lofty culture of Hellas. But how would they react to guerilla warfare?". Chapoutot suggests that the Nazis were initially disillusioned and confused by the invasion of Greece in 1941 but eventually believed that contemporary Greeks were less native to their homeland than the German invaders due to centuries of "promiscuity and racial mixing with their Asiatic and Turkic neighbors". Other contemporary Germans, like the authors of the 1931 edition of the Brockhaus encyclopedia, similarly believed that the Greeks were mixed with Slavic and Albanian blood, giving them "Western, Balkan and Asiatic characteristics".

==== Spaniards ====
For Nazis, the psychology of the Spaniards was deemed incompatible with the ideal Nazi Germans, particularly regarding their Catholicism. Ottavio de Peppo also noted that Spaniards' religious sentiments were useful to weaken Germany's position because of that contempt of the Nazis to the Spanish psychology. Hitler himself said that "All of Spain is contained in Don Quixote—a decrepit society unaware the world has passed it by", because Spain was a stagnant nation dominated by three elements that Nazis detested; the aristocracy, the Church and the monarchy, past and future, since Franco had promised a royal restoration. Also, Hitler referred to Spaniards as "lazy", of "moorish blood" and in love with "the greatest whore in history", referencing Catholic Queen Isabel. Wilhelm Faupel, Nazi director of the Ibero-American Institute, conceived his cultural foreign policy as a tool to restore the German presence on the world stage ("Weltgeltung"). Faupel then putting all his care to prevent the racism inherent to the regime from scaring away its "multipliers". Thus he sought, through the Ministry of Propaganda, to have certain libels of black legend removed from circulation, such as those of Arnold Noldens (pseudonym of Wilhelm Pferdekamp), one of whom p. ex. it bore the title Afrika beginnt hinter den Pyrenäen ("Africa begins behind the Pyrenees").

The Spanish people have a mixture of Gothic, French and Moorish blood. [...]. The Arab period [...] was the most cultivated, the most intellectual, and in all respects the best and happiest period in the history of Spain. The period of the persecutions followed, with its incessant atrocities.

— Adolf Hitler

About the crisis in Spanish society during the Civil War (and the Carlist Wars), several authors presented adherence to Marxism as a degenerative psychosis, and attempted to offer descriptions of the physiological terrain conducive to this illness. The answer was to be found in the mixed racial inheritance of Spain's long history. Antonio Vallejo-Nájera, a Spanish Nazi sympathizer, thought that Hispanic-Roman-Gothic people (Mediterranean Aryans) struggle against the Judeo-Moors (untermensch) since the Reconquista. So, the Marxist Spanish racial core had to be linked with Judeo-Moorish, and this degeneration of the Spanish race would be the cause of the decline of Spain since the fall of Spanish Empire. Also, the Spanish population, though seemingly unified, was in reality divided into two irreconcilable camps because the assimilation of Jews and Muslims had been fraudulent in their false conversions to Catholicism.

Hitler's opinion of the Spaniards would change after the Spanish defeat of the Communists in the Civil War. This was subsequently followed by the voluntary unit, the Blue Division, marching to Russia to fight on behalf of Germany. This demonstration of Spanish gallantry was considered a manifestation of Spain's Volkgeist through history, like the Tercio. This did not, however, lessen Hitler's disdain for the Spanish people, describing their Latin character as "a real hindrance," and who, as troops, were no more than "a band of ragamuffins." However, Himmler implicitly praised the worthiness of Spanish blood during a trip to Spain in October 1940 as a superior nation of Aryan descent. He did so by speaking at length about the great Visigothic heritage of Spain.

==== Basques ====
The SS-Obergruppenführer, Werner Best, and his lieutenant, Manchen, were enchanted by the fascinating "Basquenfrage", because Basques kept their racial purity by prohibiting Jews from entering the Basque Country. They were also convinced that Basque tradition based its conception of the people on their blood. As this was the same racial principles as Germans, they took this as a sign that their theories of race were a natural truth. However, there was a "Basque question", because there was not a clear answer about where Basques come from, preoccupying Nazi specialists on race if they were Aryans or not. There were theories that they could be descendants of Untermensch like the Phoenicians, Finns, or the Mongols. There were also other mythical theories, influenced by Esoteric Nazism, that they could be descendants of legendary races like Atlanteans or from those who built the Tower of Babel. However, the most popular theory said that they came from the Iberians, so, they had to be Mediterranean Aryans. Some Basques, like Jon Mirande, had sympathy for those theories.

=== Eastern Aryans ===
During the mid-1930s, foreign diplomats from Iran and Turkey who visited Germany wanted to know what the Nazis regarded them as, since Iranians and Anatolians spoke Indo-European languages. Iranians were considered to be Aryans and share the same Nordic origins as Germans. The Nazis also regarded Armenians and Georgians (including Soviet leader Stalin) as being Aryans.

==== Iranians ====
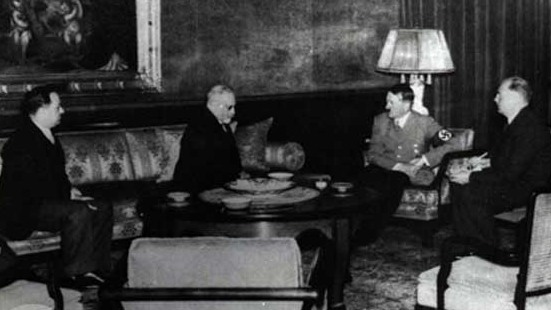
Hitler meeting Iranian ambassador Mussa Nuri Esfandiari

Alfred Rosenberg, in The Myth of the Twentieth Century, spoke about an ancient migration of a "Nordic race", in which he described the ancient Persians as "Aryans with northern blood", who had finally degenerated because of mixing with "lower races" native to the region. German orientalists and historians during the Nazi era, like Heinrich Schaeder, Heinrich Lüders, Helmut Berve, Fritz Schachermeyr, Walther Wüst, and Wilhelm Weber, adopted this racial thesis of a northern migration to Asia, believing that Nordic "Aryans" once colonized the Middle East and Inner Asia to defend their Nordic homeland against Asiatic hordes. However, many Nazis classified modern Iranians as Aryans, or Ur-arier ("original Aryans"). Hans F. K. Günther claimed that modern Iranians "are the descendants and natural heirs of the old Iranians." He describes some Iranians as being of predominantly Nordic stock, while many other Iranians are a mix between the Hither Asiatic and Nordic races—for instance, Günther classified the Persian commander Ali-Qoli Khan Bakhtiari as being an Aryan of the Nordic-Hither Asiatic type. The Nordicist and proto-Nazi racial theorist Arthur de Gobineau stated that because of their racial composition, Iranians had greater cultural and psychological affinity with Nordic peoples of Northern Europe than they did with their neighbors in the Middle East. Classifying Iranians as Aryans, Gobineau believed that the Iranian adoption of Shia Islam was part of a revolt by the Aryan Persians against the Semitic Arabs. Günther was influenced by Gobineau's thought and echoed many of these ideas, stating that the Aryan characteristics of Iranians set them apart from other races in the region and affirmed that Iranians have a European mentality. Rosenberg considered Persians to be an Indo-Germanic tribe. Hitler himself declared Iran to be an "Aryan country". In one of his speeches, Hitler proclaimed that the Aryan race has links to Iran.

Just like the Iranians laid out the historical foundations in the Middle East, the Germans formed the structure of Europe in the Middle Ages.

— Heinrich Schaeder

Beginning in 1933, Nazi leadership made efforts to increase their influence in Iran, and they financed and managed a racist journal, Iran-e Bastan, co-edited by a pro-Nazi Iranian, Abdulrahman Saif Azad. This and other chauvinistic publications in the 1930s were popular among Iranian elites, as they "highlighted the past and the pre-Islamic glories of the Persian nation and blamed the supposedly 'savage Arabs and Turks' for the backwardness of Iran." The Nazis advocated the common Aryan ancestry of Iranians and Germans. As a result, in 1936 the Reich Cabinet issued a special decree exempting Iranians from any restrictions to the Nuremberg Racial Laws on the grounds that they were "pure" Aryans. Various pro-Nazi publications, lectures, speeches, and ceremonies, also drew parallels between Reza Shah, Hitler, and Mussolini to emphasize the charismatic resemblance among these leaders. Nazi propaganda in Germany portrayed Iran as an Aryan nation and Iranians as a racial kin of the Germans. The NSDAP newspaper Völkischer Beobachter also published an article discussing the ancient Aryan history of Iran and making racial connections to German history. Pro-Nazi and pro-fascist discourse peaked in Iran during the 1930s, with Hitler being depicted as a hero of the Aryan people among Persian nationalist circles.

Nazi ideology was most common among Persian officials, elites, and intellectuals, but "even some members of non-Persian groups were eager to identify themselves with the Nazis" and a supposed Aryan race. In 1934, the Nazis celebrated the Ferdowsi millennial celebration in Berlin, in which the Nazi government declared that the German and Persian people share membership in a common Indo-Germanic race. Hitler declared Iran to be an "Aryan country"; the changing of Persia's international name to Iran in 1935 was done by the Shah at the suggestion of the German ambassador to Iran as an act of "Aryan solidarity". Also, Hitler personally promised that if he defeated the Soviet Union, he would return all of the Persian land taken by Russians during the Russo-Persian Wars. Even in 1939, Germany provided Iran with the so-called German Scientific Library. The library contained over 7,500 books selected "to convince Iranian readers... of the kinship between the National Socialist Reich and the Aryan culture of Iran". The Iranian ambassadorial envoy discussed an "Aryan renewal" of Iran with Alfred Rosenberg.

In 1936, the Nazi Office of Racial Politics, in response to a question from the German Foreign Ministry, classified non-Jewish Turks as Europeans, but "left unanswered the question of how to think about the obviously non-European Arabs, Persians, and Muslims." Later that year, ahead of the Summer Olympic Games in Berlin, the Nazis responded to questions from the Egyptians by saying that the Nuremberg racial laws did not apply to them, and after the Iranian ambassador to Berlin "assured German officials that 'there was no doubt that the Iranian, as an Aryan,' was 'racially kindred (artverwandt) with the Germans," the German Foreign Ministry "assured the Iranian Embassy in Berlin that the correct distinction between was not between "Aryans and non-Aryans" but rather between "persons of German and related blood on one hand and Jews as well as racially alien on the other." Iranians were classified as "pure-blooded Aryans" and thus were excluded from the Nuremberg Laws. This served as official confirmation by the Nazi state that Iranians and Germans share racial affinity. This Aryan classification effectively rendered Iranians as being "of related blood" to Germans, since the Expert Advisor for Population and Racial Policy had already redefined "Aryan" as someone who is "tribally" related to "German blood". Also, according to Amir-Abbas Hoveyda, who lived in Europe during World War II, German authorities were more lenient on allowing Iranian students like himself to travel throughout the Nazi-occupied territories because they were of "Aryan stock."

In Iran, Reza Shah regularly promoted the Aryan heritage of Iranians. Nazi publications in Germany such as Völkischer Beobachter also praised Reza Shah's politics of national renewal, emphasizing these Aryan racial connections. Due to their mutual promotion of the Aryan race and strong economic ties, Reza Shah and Hitler developed a close diplomatic friendship. During the Anglo-Soviet invasion of Iran, Hitler noted:

If there is anyone who is praying for the success of our arms, it must be the Shah of Persia. As soon as we drop in on him, he'll have nothing more to fear from England.

==== Turks ====
In 1935, a half-Turkish half-German man named Johannes Ruppert was forced to leave the Hitler Youth, due to the belief that as the son of a Turkish man he was not a full Aryan as required by the Reich Citizenship Law. Ruppert sought assistance from the Turkish Embassy in Berlin to clarify how “the Aryan question” affected his case. The Turkish Embassy brought the matter to the attention of the German Foreign Ministry. In a note of 20 December 1935, a Foreign Ministry official wrote that "opening up the Aryan question in relation to Turkey is extraordinarily undesirable as well as dangerous for our relations with Turkey". However, in January 1936, Foreign Ministry wrote a memo to the Nazi Party Office of Racial Policy, writing that it was "essential that determination of whether the Turks are Aryan be decided as soon as possible", so that the Foreign Ministry could give "a satisfactory answer" to the Turkish Embassy’s repeated questions about the issue, since there had been individual cases, that is, others in addition to Ruppert, in which "German citizens with Turkish mixed-blood had run into difficulties with the state and the Nazi Party due to their origins". The classification of Turks as "non-Aryans", in keeping with Nazi racial theories, led to foreign policy complications, because the Nazis considered the Turkish government as a potential ally. Consequently, the racial theories had to be "modified" to some degree in accordance with foreign policy requirements.

On 30 April 1936 Nazi Office for Racial Policy released a circular which stated that the Turks were "Europeans" while explaining that Turkish citizens of Jewish background would still be considered Jews and Turks of "colored origin" would be considered non-European. Some Turkish and international newspapers, such as the Swiss Le Temps and the Turkish Republique, reported at the time that the Turks had been recognized as an "Aryan nation" and that they were exempt from the Nuremberg Laws. Turkish newspaper Akşam published an article with the headline "The Turks are Aryans!". Such reports were picked up by other international newspapers; however, the claim that the Turks had been recognized as an "Aryan nation" and that they were exempt from the Nuremberg Laws was a hoax. Nazi officials themselves disputed these reports by publishing a press release which stated that they were unfounded. The Nazis classified Turks as "European" and not as "Aryans" and the decision had no practical consequences.

In May 1942, a writer in the official journal of the Nazi Office for Racial Policy, Neues Volk, replied to a father's question caused by his daughter's relationship with a Turkish man, about whether racial differences between Germans and Turks meant that a marriage should not take place. The reply read:

A marriage or similar connection between your daughter with a Turk is out of the question. A Near Eastern blood element [Bluteinschlag] predominates among the Turks, among whom, alongside Oriental and Western racial components, mongoloid racial elements also enter. The Near Eastern and Oriental races are alien [artfremde] races. The same is true of the mongoloid [Mongolide] races. Moreover, in such cases, even when such racial considerations are not present, marriages of German young women with foreigners are not desirable. If your daughter does not want to listen to you, she faces the danger of being placed in protective custody. We emphatically point out to you and to your daughter the serious consequences of this behavior, one that obviously does not possess the slightest feeling for the honor of the Volk [nicht das geringste völkische Ehregefühl besitzt].

Although the Nazi leadership agreed with the content of the reply, they criticized the journal for publishing it, because, in a foreign policy point of view, it was really clumsy ("denkbar ungeschickt") to publish before defeating the British in Middle East. For example, Franz von Papen, the German ambassador to Turkey, informed the German Foreign Ministry that the publication of this text "has serious foreign policy considerations". He noted that such statements could aid "our Anglo-Saxon opponents" in their "propaganda against us" and asked the Office of Racial Politics not to publish such things in the future. On 16 May 1942, Franz Rademacher, director of the Office of Jewish Affairs in the German Foreign Ministry, wrote to Walter Gross, the founder and editor of the magazine, that he "had no objection to the content of the information from a racial-political viewpoint but that it was "from a foreign policy standpoint, really clumsy” and "a political blunder" that would have "embarrassing and awkward foreign policy implications". Nazi officials sought to prevent miscegenation between Turks and Germans and, if necessary, sought to imprison or deport the "offending" Turkish man.

Ostensibly, Turks were still considered Europeans and therefore "of related blood" to Germans (Aryans) under the Nuremberg Laws. As a result, Turks or people of Turkish descent were included as being Germans. However, the above noted restrictions still persisted regularly.

==== Georgians ====
Hitler remarked about the Georgians during one of his Table Talks:

The Georgians are a Caucasian tribe that has nothing to do with the Turkish [i.e Turkic] peoples. I regard only the Muslims as safe. All the others are considered unsafe... For the time being, I regard the building up of these pure Caucasian nations as quite risky, whereas I don't see a danger in building up a unit consisting only of Muslims... Georgians are not a Turkish people; rather a typical Caucasian tribe, probably even with some Nordic blood in them.

Compared to other Soviet nationalities, Georgians were given preferential treatment and there was even a Georgian Legion. Hitler also theorized that Joseph Stalin's Georgian ethnicity, as well as the fact that the Georgian SSR was nominally autonomous, would eventually draw the Georgians closer to the USSR than to Germany. Several Georgian scholars such as Alexander Nikuradze and Michael Achmeteli served as advisors for Nazis such as Alfred Rosenberg. Rosenberg and Nikuradze both believed that Georgians were a "superior people" compared to Turks and Tatars due to Georgians being Aryans.

On 24 August 1939, during the meeting of the Molotov–Ribbentrop Pact, Hitler asked his personal photographer Heinrich Hoffmann to photograph Georgian-born Soviet leader Stalin's earlobes to determine whether or not he was an "Aryan" or a "Jew". Hitler concluded that he was an "Aryan". Himmler regarded Stalin as being descended from lost "Nordic-Germanic-Aryan blood".

The Nazis generally considered the population of the Caucasus to be "non-Slavic and Aryan."

==== Armenians ====
Armenians were considered an Aryan people, both by the Nazi state and Alfred Rosenberg's racial theory. However, Adolf Hitler personally did not trust them. Due to this, the Armenian Legion was mainly stationed in the Netherlands. Speaking about military units from Soviet peoples, Hitler said: "I don't know about these Georgians. They do not belong to the Turkic peoples...I consider only the Muslims to be reliable...All others I deem unreliable. For the time being I consider the formation of these battalions of purely Caucasian peoples very risky, while I don't see any danger in the establishment of purely Muslim units...In spite of all declarations from Rosenberg and the military, I don't trust the Armenians either."

Alfred Rosenberg declared that the Armenians were Aryans, and thus they were immediately subject to conscription. In late 1942, the pro-Nazi Armenian National Council was granted official recognition by Rosenberg, and they published a weekly journal titled Armenién. The purpose of this was to prove to the Nazis that the Armenians were Aryans. With the help of Paul Rohrbach, they achieved this goal and were accepted as Aryans. The Nazis did not persecute Armenians in Nazi-occupied territories as a result. Overall, the Nazis viewed the population of the Caucasus as being "non-Slavic and Aryan." According to Versteeg, however, "Although Armenians officially were considered 'Aryans', the notion of them being 'Levantine traders', similar to the Jews, was deep-seated in Nazi circles, and racial 'purists' along with Hitler himself were prone to look upon the Armenians as 'non-Aryans.'"

=== Indians ===
During the Nazi regime, India was still ruled by the British Raj. Hitler's views on Indians were generally disparaging, and his plans for the region were heavily influenced by his racial views, especially related to India's subdued colonized status. Hitler viewed Indians and Hindus as racially inferior, and contrasted the supposed "racial inferiority of the Indian" with the qualities of the "superior" Nordic Briton. As a result of this view, he rejected any demands for supporting Indians against British imperialism as an attempt to reverse the "natural ranking order of the races." Hitler considered Otto Strasser's admiration for Mahatma Gandhi to be a "racial perversity." As a result, Hitler considered the Indian independence movement to be carried out by the "lower Indian race against the superior English Nordic race", and referred to participants in the movement as "Asiatic jugglers".

On the Indian Legion, Hitler said:

The Indian Legion is a joke. These are Indians who couldn’t kill a louse, who’d rather be eaten themselves. They wouldn’t kill an Englishman either. To have them face the English of all people is really a stupid idea, I think. Why should the Indians fight more courageously for us than they fought in India itself, under Bose’s leadership? They put Indian units into action in Burma, under Bose’s leadership, to free India from the English. They ran away like sheep. Why should they be braver with us? I think that if the Indians were used to turn prayer wheels or something like that, they’d be the most untiring soldiers in the world. But to use them in real bloody combat is ridiculous. How strong are the Indians? [—] Besides, it’s nonsense. If we had an abundance of weapons, we could afford such jokes for propagandistic reasons. But if we don’t have an abundance of weapons, these propagandistic jokes just can’t be justified.

Nevertheless, Nazi Germany sometimes used the idea of an Aryan link between the German and Indian peoples in its propaganda aimed at Indians, particularly amid increasingly deteriorating relations between Germany and Britain in the late 1930s.

Alfred Rosenberg claimed that although Vedic culture was Aryan in origin, any Nordic blood in India had long since dissipated due to racial miscegenation. Hans F. K. Günther proposed that the Indian cultural sphere was produced by Nordic immigrants which in his view were tall and fair-skinned. They brought with them the elite of ancient India. These Nordic immigrants brought the art of woodworking and body-burning, and had a comparatively highly developed social system that was placed in the caste system as the highest caste of light-skinned Hindus. Günther believed that there were many parallels between Hindu Vedas and Zoroastrian Avesta with Germanic paganism and Nordic mythology that could only be explained by a Northern European origin, especially because Hindus and Romans mutually regarded the gods as living in the far north. He argued that it was infiltration by native non-Indo-European peoples, who were dark-skinned and shorter, that led to the decline of Indo-Aryan peoples and the fall of the Indian civilization, with other factors for their decline being Buddhism, the tropical climate, and racial mixture.

According to Günther, the appearance of Buddha and the essence of Buddhism had lost all Nordic inspiration, racially and spiritually. In this theory, Buddhism wholly and irretrievably broke down the racial discipline and forethought of the "wonderful gifted people" that were the Indo-Aryan Hindus. Buddhism was spread by non-Nordic missionaries and it supposedly sapped the courageous soul of the early Hindu wisdom, and instead preached the spirit of resignation. For the religious aspects of Nazism, Buddhism showed no really constructive thought and it only led to the abnegation of the will to beget life: it preached hostility against the will of the individual to root himself within his people (thereby tearing the individual out of their racial-historical framework). Instead, Buddhism distorted the Brahminism that was created in early Hindu times, since it went against that the Hindu harmony with all life due to its demand for the renunciation of sexual life and its discouragement of marriage and all property. Günther stated that this philosophical outlook was at the core of Buddhism and it helped with the disappearance of Nordic blood. Furthermore, the Indian climate played a very important part in the disappearance of this Aryan elite, as they were not adapted to a tropical region and were negatively affected with regards to the selective direction of the Nordic element in their people. However, the invasion of Indo-Scythian tribes by the Greeks (after Alexander the Great's Indian campaign) supposedly seemed to have brought a Nordic racial revival after establishing the Greco-Bactrian Kingdom and the Indo-Greek Kingdom. But, racial mixture was bound to lead to the decay of the Hindu culture. With the rise of the Mongol dominion (which lasted from the eighth century until 1536), the victory of the Asiatic racial elements in India was complete, and the Hindu mind continued to drift farther and farther away from the old Aryans.

=== Arabs ===
During the times of Nazi Germany, Arabs were a small population in Europe.

Albert Speer, in his best-selling memoir Inside the Third Reich, mentions many famous anecdotes told about Adolf Hitler's views on Islam and Arabs expressing admiration for their conquests.

About the possibility that Germans, who had converted to Islam, wanted to become or remain members of the Nazi Party, Martin Bormann, the head of the Nazi Party Reichskanzlei, sent Hitler's decision:

In response to questions, the Führer had decided that Germans who are believers in Islam can remain members of Nationalsozialistische Deutsche Arbeiterpartei (NSDAP)[1]. Belief is a personal matter of conscience. Muslims can be members of the NSDAP just as can members of the Christian confessions.

— Hitler's decision regarding "Adherence of Party Members to Islam" to Reichsleiter, Gauleiter, and Verbändeführer

In 1936, in response to questions from Arab diplomats in Berlin, officials in the Foreign Ministry, the Nazi Party's Rassenpolitisches Amt, and the Propaganda Ministry discussed the matter of whether Arab were Aryans. Reports from "Jewish-French newspapers" (according to Eberhard von Stohrer, German ambassador in Cairo) saying that the German race legislation would have classified Egyptians (Arabs), Iranians, and Turks as non-Aryans caused considerable controversy in Muslim world; even the chairman of Egypt's Olympic Committee expressed "great disquiet and concern" in a telegram to German officials organizing the Berlin Olympic committee. Walter Gross wrote to the Foreign Ministry to assure it that neither he nor anyone else in the Rassenpolitisches Amt had made such claims (in declaring Egyptians and Arabs as non-Aryans) to the press. The German government reassured that the Nuremberg Laws do not, in fact, specifically label Arabs as non-Aryans. An assurance was made that Egyptians were not barred from marrying Germans, for example. In reality, this was a misleading answer, as the law defined technically allowed Egyptian or other citizens to marry Germans, but only because citizenship was not the determining factor: if a person was considered to be of "German blood" and was marrying another person of "German blood", or if both were of "Alien blood", marriage was allowed; marriages between those of "German blood" and "Alien blood" were however forbidden; citizenship was not the determining factor. These confused and utilitarian discussions about the meaning of blood and race at the 1936 Summer Olympics offered a legal and theoretical basis for reconciling German racial laws with closely related peoples such as non-Jewish Semites (Arabs) before and during the World War II.

Relations and marriages between Arab men and German women in Nazi Germany aroused the hostile attention of the Rassenpolitisches Amt, whose officials sought to prevent such bonds and, if necessary to imprison or deport the "offending" Arab and Muslim man. Mohammed Helmy, an Egyptian doctor who was born in Sudan, was barred from marrying his German fiancé, Annie Ernst, due to being legally classified as a 'Hamite'. Hitler had told his military commanders in 1939, shortly before the start of World War II:

We will continue to sow riots in the Far East and the Arabian Peninsula. Our logic is the logic of gentlemen. And we see in such towns, at best, polished apes, who want to taste the whip.

Other Egyptians were targeted in racist incidents, along with 'half-breeds' who had German and North African/Arab ancestry. The latter were mostly sterilized. On the onset of war, Egyptian citizens were interned in response to the internment of Germans in Egypt. Tens of thousands of French colonial soldiers were imprisoned after fighting alongside French forces in the Battle of France.

Then, in the summer of 1940 and again in February 1941, during the Anglo-Iraqi War, Amin al-Husseini submitted to the Nazi German government a draft declaration of German-Arab cooperation, containing a clause about their thoughts of the Arabs as having a volkisch superior to the Jews, even if both were Semitic.

Germany and Italy recognize the right of the Arab countries to solve the question of the Jewish elements, which exist in Palestine and in the other Arab countries, as required by the national and ethnic (völkisch) interests of the Arabs, and as the Jewish question was solved in Germany and Italy.

Hitler, recalling Husseini, remarked that he "has more than one Aryan among his ancestors and one who may be descended from the best Roman stock." On 23 October 1942, Nazi Germany's Arabic language propaganda station, "Berlin in Arabic," sent the following broadcast to Egypt, in which presented Gross's reply to "H.E. [His Excellency] The Prime Minister of Iraq", after Raschid Ali al-Gaylani solicit an answer from an official source regarding the German consideration of the Arab race.

In answer to your Excellency's letter of 17th October 1942, I have the honor to give you the racial theory regarding the Arab caste. The racial policy has been adopted by Germany to safeguard the German people against the Jews who, biologically, are different from the Middle East races. Accordingly, Europe has been opposing the Jews for decades. The Germans do not fight the Jews because they are Semitic or because they come from the East, but for their character, egoism and their hostility to society...While Germany forbids the entrance of the Jews into her territory, she welcomes all Arabs of Semitic origin and cares for them. The attitude of the Germans for the Arabs is that of respect. Not a single official German source ever stated that the Arabs originated from a lower caste. On the contrary, the racial theory of National Socialism considers the Arabs of a very high caste. The oppression of the Arabs of Palestine is being followed in Germany with great interest and Germany confirms [i.e. supports, JH] the demands of the Arabs.

In reality, the propaganda differed markedly from the discriminatory racial laws and threat of deportation Arab students in Germany were subjected to, along with anti-Arab statements by Nazis that were not intended for propaganda use in the Middle East, which occurred under the very Office of Racial Policy that Walter Gross headed. During the 1940 Battle of France, Arab colonial troops of the French Army were often targeted for murder and other demeaning treatment, as detailed by Hans Habe. The Nazis committed many massacres as well, exemplified by the SS "Totenkopf" Division's racially motivated killings of Moroccan prisoners of war during the Battle of France. Fascist Italy and Nazi Germany's propaganda efforts were receptive by a minority of Arab and Islamic political and intellectual elites, but was not great enough to tip the scales of the war in North Africa in 1942. If the Axis powers won the campaign, that minority would have likely been collaborators in a German occupation of Egypt and Palestine.

Occasionally, a racial fanatic from the Rassenpolitisches Amt would publicly crusade against the miscegenation between Germans and Arabs (as they were Semites). If and when that happened, it caused problems for German diplomats and soldiers in their propaganda campaigns to convince Arabs and Muslims that Nazi Germany and the Axis Powers were their friends and natural allies against international communism, British colonialism and the "judenfrage". They demanded that their officers have discretion until they won the war. This being the case, the Foreign Office Archives indicate that, at the same time as Nazi radio broadcasts and pamphlets were being distributed by the North African corps proclaiming Germany's sympathy and support for Arab independence and freedom, the Nazi officials at the Rassenpolitisches Amt and various university officials were determined to prevent "foreign" (artfremder) students from Arab countries from continuing personal relationships with German women by withdrawing their permission to study at German universities. Fritz Grobba, the official in the Foreign Ministry who was responsible for liaison with the former Iraqi politician, Raschid Ali al-Gailani (pro-Axis), agreed that expelling Arab students during the war was also out of the question. Deportation would have to be to a neutral country where the students "would fall into the hands of hostile intelligence services".

According to historian Gerhard Höpp, there were 450 Arab inmates in Nazi concentration camps, including Auschwitz (34), (Note: The Auschwitz Memorial and Museum puts the number of Muslims at 58, but this includes Muslim Soviets prisoners of war "Which Religious Denominations Did the People Deported to Auschwitz Belong To?". www.auschwitz.org. 24 April 2006. A text search on https://memorial-archives.international/searches/search , a website dedicated to archiving the names of victims of the Holocaust, returns 109 results for the search "Moamed OR Mohammed OR Mohamed OR Mohamet OR Mehmed") Bergen-Belsen (21), Buchenwald (148), Dachau (84), Flossenburg (39), Gross-Rosen (12), Hinzert (3), Mauthausen (62), Mittelbau-Dora (39), Natzweiler (37), Neuengamme (110–73 at the Alderney satellite camp), Ravensbruck (25), Sachsenhausen (42) and others. Most of the inmates were Algerians who were living in France, and were used for Nazi slave labor. One in five Arabs did not survive the camps, and one—a Moroccan named Mohamed Bouayad—was killed in a gas chamber at Mauthausen only eleven days before its liberation.

Josef R., a former prisoner in Sachsenhausen, testified about an "Arab who couldn't speak any German at all" called "Ali":

It was a cold winter and 'Ali' had to stand for hours outdoors, where cold water was poured over him and he was punched and kicked. 'Ali' was about 45 years old at that time and it was surely more than he could take. But I don't know which SS man did that to 'Ali' at that time.

=== Slavs ===
As early as World War I, Hitler had viewed Slavs as primitive subhumans and for this reason detested German alliance with Austria-Hungary. In his works such as the Mein Kampf and Zweites Buch, Hitler accused the Slavs of lacking any capability to form a working government. In addition, Hitler believed that Slavs like Poles did not deserve education. With the formation of Soviet Union, Hitler's hostilities against Russia increased drastically, viewing the country as a base for a global Jewish conspiracy. As early as 1934, Joseph Stalin had suspected Nazi Germany of organizing a racial war against Slavic populations and informed this publicly during the 17th Communist Party Congress. Hitler's beliefs in the racial inferiority of Russians personally convinced him that German invasion of Soviet Union will succeed. During the execution of General Plan Ost, Nazis implemented numerous discriminatory laws against Slavic populations. Furthermore, Hitler issued numerous directives banning Slavs from access to education, healthcare and hygiene.

Hitler's conception of the Aryan Herrenvolk (master race) explicitly excluded the vast majority of Slavs, regarding the Slavs as having dangerous Jewish and Asiatic influences. Because of this, the Nazis declared Slavs to be Untermenschen (subhumans). Exceptions were made for a small percentage of Slavs who were seen by the Nazis to be descended from German settlers and therefore fit to be Germanised to be considered part of the Aryan folk or nation. Hitler declared that the Geneva Conventions were not applicable to Slavs because they were subhumans, and German soldiers were thus permitted to ignore the Geneva Conventions in World War II with regard to Slavs. Hitler called Slavs a rabbit family meaning they were intrinsically idle and disorganized. Nazi Germany's propaganda minister Joseph Goebbels had media speak of Slavs as primitive animals who were from the Siberian tundra who were like a dark wave of filth. The Nazi notion of Slavs being inferior non-Aryans was part of the agenda for creating Lebensraum (living space) for Germans and other Germanic people in eastern Europe that was initiated during World War II under Generalplan Ost: millions of Germans and other Germanic settlers would be moved into conquered territories of Eastern Europe, while the original Slavic inhabitants were to be annihilated, removed, or enslaved. During the execution of General Plan Ost, Nazis implemented numerous discriminatory laws against Slavic populations. Furthermore, Hitler issued numerous directives banning Slavs from access to education, healthcare and hygiene.

"The Slavs are a mass of born slaves, who feel the need of a master."

— Adolf Hitler, in Hitler's Table Talk

While anti-Slavism had precedent in German society before Hitler's rule, Nazi racism against Slavs was also based on the doctrines of scientific racism. Historian John Connelly argues that the Nazi policies carried out against the Slavs during World War II cannot be fully explained by the racist theories endorsed by the Nazis because of the contradictions and opportunism that occurred during the war. Hitler classified the Slavs, primarily the Poles, Russians, Serbs, Belarusians, Ukrainians, and the Czechs, as untermenschen.

Prior to the outbreak of the war in 1939, there was only a vague notion of Slavs as an inferior group in the minds of the leading Nazis. How inferior would be determined later on during the war. The Nazis, and even ordinary people, thought that Eastern Europe, namely the Slavic-speaking areas, was the most racially inferior part of Europe, and very distinct from the rest of Europe. In addition to deeming them inferior, Nazis also viewed Slavs as the agents of Judeo-Bolshevism. In a 1941 article titled "Zur Psychologie des Ostraumes" ("On the psychology of the Eastern Realm") published in Zeitschrift für Geopolitik journal, Nazi psychologist Gustav Richard Heyer characterized Slavs as "natural slaves" predisposed to servitude, inhabiting Eastern Europe in a primitive state akin to wildlife. Heyer further depicted Germans as a "Prometheus"-like figure for Eastern Europe.

Günther in his book The Racial Science of Europe wrote that the Slavs were originally Nordic but over the centuries had mixed with other races. In The Racial Elements of European History he wrote: "The east of Europe shows a gradual transition of the racial mixtures of Central Europe into predominantly East Baltic and Inner Asiatic regions... Owing to the likeness between East Baltic and Inner Asiatic bodily characters it will often be hard to fix a sharp boundary between these two races". He noted that the Nordic race was prominently found along the Vistula, the Neva, the Dwina and in southern Volhynia, but the further south and east, the East Baltic race became more common and finally in some regions there was "a strong Inner Asiatic admixture". In the Russian-speaking regions he estimated were between at 25 per cent and 30 per cent Nordic. In the Polish regions there was an increase in the East Baltic race, Alpine race, and Inner Asiatic the further east.

Günther, who greatly influenced Hitler and Nazi ideology, studied and wrote about the supposed racial origins of the Slavs. He concluded that Slavs were originally Nordic, but after mixing with other races over the centuries they eventually came to be predominantly of the East Baltic race. However, some Poles and other Slavs were considered to have enough Nordic admixture to be Germanized, because they were supposedly descended from the Nordic ruling class of the early Slavs. He wrote that the further East the more the "Inner Asiatic" racial ancestry was prominent. He wrote that of the Poles and other Slavs who were predominantly of the East Baltic race that they were mentally slow, dirty and incapable of long term planning. He also claimed that the East Baltic race was the reason why some German districts had "a heavy proportion of crime".

Himmler in the 1920s was a member of the anti-Slavic Artaman League and wrote:

Increase of our peasant population is the only effective defense against the influx of the Slav working-class masses from the East. As six hundred years ago, the German peasant's destiny must be to preserve and increase the German people's patrimony in their holy mother earth battle against the Slav race.

Hitler in Mein Kampf wrote that Germany's Lebensraum (living space) was going to be in Eastern Europe:

And so, we National Socialists consciously draw a line beneath the foreign policy tendency of our pre–War period. We take up where we broke off six hundred years ago. We stop the endless German movement to the south and west, and turn our gaze toward the land in the East. At long last, we break off the colonial and commercial policy of the pre–War period and shift to the soil policy of the future.

Hitler in his unpublished second book Zweites Buch wrote that the Nazi Party's foreign policy was going to be based on securing Lebensraum for the German people:

The National Socialist Movement, on the contrary, will always let its foreign policy be determined by the necessity to secure the space necessary to the life of our Folk. It knows no Germanising or Teutonising, as in the case of the national bourgeoisie, but only the spread of its own Folk. It will never see in the subjugated, so called Germanised, Czechs or Poles a national, let alone Folkish, strengthening, but only the racial weakening of our Folk.

In the same book, he wrote that the peoples in the annexed territories would not be Germanized:

The völkisch State, conversely, must under no conditions annex Poles with the intention of wanting to make Germans out of them some day. On the contrary, it must muster the determination either to seal off these alien racial elements, so that the blood of its own Folk will not be corrupted again, or it must, without further ado, remove them and hand over the vacated territory to its own National Comrades.

To justify their acquisition of Lebensraum (living space) for Germans, the Nazis later classified Slavs as a racially inferior "Asiatic-Bolshevik" horde.

During the war, the Gestapo persecuted sexual relations between Germans and the peoples of Eastern Europe because of the "risk for the racial integrity of the German nation". Regardless, soldiers regularly raped Ukrainian, Belarusian, and Russian women and girls before shooting them. Many East European women were also kidnapped and forced to work in sex brothels.

Himmler in a secret memorandum titled Reflections on the Treatment of Peoples of Alien Races in the East commented about the forceful Germanisation of children of German blood in Eastern Europe:

The parents of such children of good blood will be given the choice to either give away their child; they will then probably produce no more children so that the danger of this subhuman people of the East [Untermenschenvolk des Ostens] obtaining class of leaders which, since it would be equal to us, would also be dangerous for us, will disappear—or else the parents pledge themselves to go to Germany and to become loyal citizens there. The love toward their child, whose future and education depends on the loyalty of the parents, will be a strong weapon in dealing with them.

In the same memorandum, Himmler remarked that the future of the non-German population in the East would be:

No higher school than the four-grade elementary school. The sole goal of this school is to be... Simply arithmetic up to 500 at the most; writing of one's name; the doctrine that it is a divine law to obey the Germans and to be honest, industrious, and good. I don't think that reading is necessary.

Himmler classified Slavs as "bestial untermenschen" and regarded Jews as the "decisive leader of the untermenschen". In 1941, Himmler advocated that in the annexed territories a bulwark "be created against the Slav nations through the settlement of German farmers and farmers of German descent". Himmler declared that the Germanisation of Eastern Europe would be fully completed when "in the East dwell only men with truly German, Germanic blood".

Himmler in his Posen speeches in 1943 said:

One basic principle must be the absolute rule for the SS men: We must be honest, decent, loyal and comradely to members of our own blood and to nobody else. What happens to a Russian, to a Czech, does not interest me in the slightest. What other nations can offer in the way of good blood of our type, we will take, if necessary, by kidnapping their children and raising them here with us. Whether nations live in prosperity or starve to death interests me only so far as we need them as slaves for our culture; otherwise, it is of no interest to me. Whether 10,000 Russian females fall down from exhaustion while digging an antitank ditch interests me only insofar as the anti-tank ditch for Germany is finished. [...] The Slav is never able to build anything himself. In the long run, he's not capable of it. I'll come back to this later. With the exception of a few phenomena produced by Asia every couple of centuries, through that mixture of two heredities which may be fortunate for Asia but is unfortunate for us Europeans – with the exception, therefore, of an Attila, a Ghenghis Khan, a Tamerlaine, a Lenin, a Stalin – the mixed race of the Slavs is based on a sub-race with a few drops of blood of our blood, blood of a leading race; the Slav is unable to control himself and create order. He is able to argue, able to debate, able to disintegrate, able to offer resistance against every authority and to revolt. But these human shoddy goods are just as incapable of maintaining order today as they were 700 or 800 years ago, when they called in the Varangians, when they called in the Ruriks.

Historian Mark Mazower points out some inconsistencies or variations in Nazi racial theories of the Slavs:

Hitler himself thought Himmler's race mysticism was impractical and, while hostile to Serbs and Russians in general, he felt differently about other groups of Slavs. He praised the Czechs as 'industrious and intelligent workers' and speculated that blue-eyed Ukrainians might be 'peasant descendants of German tribes who never migrated'. In fact, he came round to the view—common among German anthropologists—that there was, racially speaking, no such category as 'Slavs'; it was a linguistic term, nothing more. That did not stop it continuing to be used. But it helps explain why the Führer allowed Himmler and Forster each to define Germanness in his own way.

==== Bulgarians ====
Joseph Goebbels wrote in his diary on 14 December 1938 that the Bulgarians were a "courageous people and also our friends". During the war, Hitler remarked "to label the Bulgarians as Slavs is pure nonsense; originally they were Turkomans", but still considered them racially "inferior", along with Ukrainians, east-European Jews and Soviet Russians. Hitler distrusted Bulgaria; in March 1942, he even stated that he "prefer[red] the Turks to the Bulgarians" but in August he said that Bulgaria is "an ally on whom we can rely against the Turks". The Nazi "alliance" with Bulgaria was partly due to his admiration of Tsar Boris III, and partly due to an ideological compromise that was politically expedient given the German need for cooperation with Bulgaria.

==== Croats ====
Hitler remarked about the Croats during a table talk:

If the Croats were part of the Reich, we'd have them serving as faithful auxiliaries of the German Fuehrer, to police our marches. Whatever happens, one shouldn't treat them as Italy is doing at present. The Croats are a proud people. They should be bound directly to the Fuehrer by an oath of loyalty. Like that, one could rely upon them absolutely. When I have Kvaternik standing in front of me, I behold the very type of the Croat as I've always known him, unshakeable in his friendships, a man whose oath is eternally binding. The Croats are very keen on not being regarded as Slavs. According to them, they're descended from the Goths. The fact that they speak a Slav language is only an accident, they say.

The Croatian fascist Ustaše government rejected the idea that the Croats descended from Slavic tribes and endorsed the idea that they descended from Germanic Gothic tribes. On 30 April 1941, the government passed three racial laws: the "Legal Decree on Racial Origins", the "Legal Decree on the Protection of Aryan Blood and the Honor of the Croatian People" and the "Legal Provision on Citizenship". Despite these claims, however, the Nazi state continued to classify Croats as "subhuman".

==== Bosnians ====
The romantic notions that Himmler had about the Bosniaks were probably significant in the genesis of the 13th Waffen Mountain Division of the SS Handschar (1st Croatian) and 23rd Waffen Mountain Division of the SS Kama (2nd Croatian). Nonetheless, a memorandum dated 1 November 1942 also indicates that leading Muslim autonomists had already suggested the creation of a volunteer Waffen-SS unit under German command. Himmler was personally fascinated by the Islamic faith and believed that Islam created fearless soldiers. He found their ferocity preferable to the gentility of Christians and believed their martial qualities should be further developed and put to use. He thought that Muslim men would make perfect SS soldiers as Islam "promises them Heaven if they fight and are killed in action."

==== Czechs ====
After the Nazis' proclamation of the Protectorate of Bohemia and Moravia on 16 March 1939, the deputy Gauleiter of the Sudetenland, Karl Frank, defined a 'German':

Whoever professes himself to be a member of the German nation is a member of the German nation, provided that this profession is confirmed by certain facts, such as language, upbringing, culture, etc. Persons of alien blood, particularly Jews, are never Germans. ... Because professing to be a member of the German nation is of vital significance, even someone who is partly or completely of another race—Czech, Slovak, Ukrainian, Hungarian, or Polish, for example—can be considered a German. Any more precise elaboration of the term "German national" is not possible given current relationships.

The Nazis aimed to Germanize the Bohemian and Moravian areas. The issue of sexual relations and marriages between Czechs and Germans was problematic. The Nazis did not prohibit marriages between Czechs and Germans and no law prohibited Jews from marrying Czechs. German women who married Czech men lost their Reich citizenship whereas Czech women who married German men were allowed to become part of the German Volk.

Although Hitler considered Czechs to be of Mongolian origin, in accordance with the idea of completely Germanizing the Protectorate of Bohemia and Moravia in 1940 he agreed with racial anthropologists that up to 50% of Czechs contained enough Nordic blood that they could be Germanized, while the "Mongoloid types" and the Czech intelligentsia were not to be Germanized and were to be "deprived of their power, eliminated, and shipped out of the country by all sorts of methods".

In 1941 Hitler praised the "hard work and inventiveness of the Czechs" to his Propaganda Minister Goebbels and a year later he remarked that the Czechs were "industrious and intelligent workers".

==== Poles ====
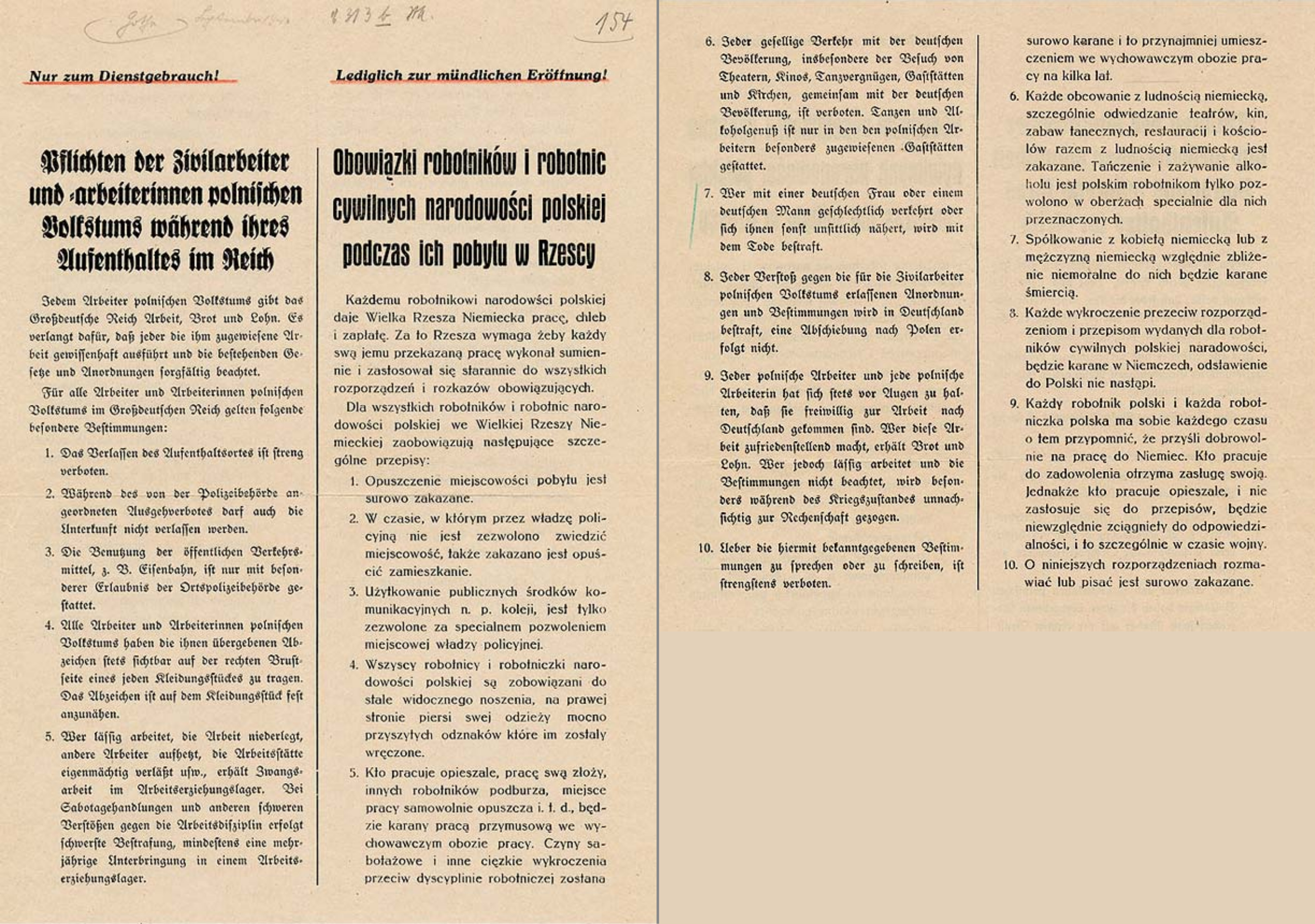
Poster (in German and Polish): Obligations of Polish Workers in Germany which included the death penalty for sexual relations with a German

Hitler thought of the Poles as an alien race. He criticised earlier attempts to Germanise ethnic Poles, arguing in Mein Kampf that the racial inferiority of the Poles would weaken the German nation.

Günther regarded Northern Poland as being predominantly Nordic and held that the Nordic race was to be found amongst the upper classes.

An influential figure among German racist theorists, Otto Reche, became director of the Institute for Racial and Ethnic Sciences in occupied Lipsk during World War II and advocated the genocide of the Polish nation. In his position he wrote that ethnic Poles were "an unfortunate mixture" consisting among others of Slavs, Balts and Mongolians, and that they should be eliminated to avoid possible mixing with the German race. When Germany invaded Poland he wrote "We need Raum (space), but no Polish lice on our fur".

After the invasion of Poland in 1939, Nazi propaganda began to depict Poles as subhumans. On 24 October 1939, after a meeting in the Propaganda Ministry, the Directive No.1306 of Nazi Germany's Propaganda Ministry was issued which stated:

It must be made clear even to the German milkmaid that Polishness equals subhumanity. Poles, Jews and Gypsies are on the same inferior level... This should be brought home as a leitmotiv, and from time to time, in the form of existing concepts such as 'Polish economy', 'Polish ruin' and so on, until everyone in Germany sees every Pole, whether farm worker or intellectual, as vermin."

Goebbels and Hitler believed that Asia began in Poland. Goebbels in his diary on 10 October 1939 wrote what Hitler thought of the Poles:

The Führer's verdict on the Poles is damning. More like animals than human beings, completely primitive, stupid, and amorphous. And a ruling class that is an unsatisfactory result of a mingling between the lower orders and an Aryan master race. The Poles' dirtiness is unimaginable. Their capacity for intelligent judgment is absolutely nil.

A November 1939 memorandum from the Office of Racial Policy—written by Dr. Erhard Wetzel and Dr. Gerhard Hecht and titled “The Question of the Treatment of the Population of the Former Polish Regions according to Racial-Political Considerations”—concluded that there were racial differences between Germans and Poles and any racial similarities were because of German-Nordic ancestry in the Polish blood. It also claimed that the Poles had mixed with “East Baltic, oriental, and Asiatic populations” and that there was “high-level contamination of the Polish people by Jewish blood”.

In December 1939, Himmler declared that racial assessments were essential to avoid "mongrel types from emerging in the territories that are to be newly settled. I want to create a blond province."

The Polish decrees that were about forced Polish workers working in Germany and were enacted on 8 May 1940 stated that any Polish man or woman for having sexual intercourse with a German man or woman. Nazi propaganda issued leaflets for farmhouses where Polish workers resided and informed Germans:

Maintain the purity of German blood! That applies to both men and women! Just as it is considered the greatest disgrace to become involved with a Jew, any German engaging in intimate relations with a Polish male or female is guilty of sinful behavior. Despise the bestial urges of this race! Be racially conscious and protect your children. Otherwise you will forfeit your greatest asset: your honor!

German women who had sexual intercourse with Polish workers had their heads shaved and were then forced to have a placard around her neck detailing her crime and paraded around the place where she lived. After 1940, Poles were regularly hanged without trials for accusations of sexual intercourse with German women.

During the war Hitler stated that Germans should not mix with Poles in order to prevent any "Germanic blood" being transmitted to the Polish ruling class.

The Germanization of Poles in Nazi-occupied Poland was troublesome since different Nazis had different beliefs about who could be Germanized. Although Gauleiter and Reichsstatthalter of Danzig-West Prussia Albert Forster advocated for the extermination of Poles, he was more than happy to accept Poles who claimed to have "German blood" to be Germans. Attempting to find out if those Poles were of German ancestry was almost an impossibility and Poles who were interviewed by Nazi Party workers were taken at face value without requiring any documents to prove their claims. However, this policy was at odds with Himmler and the Gauleiter and Reichsstatthalter of the German-occupied territory of Wartheland Arthur Greiser. Himmler and Greiser both advocated for an ethnic cleansing policy of the Poles in the Wartheland so the territory could be resettled by Germans. Hitler left each Gauleiter to Germanise his own territory to how he saw fit with "no questions asked". Under the classifications set out by the Deutsche Volksliste (German Peoples' List), approximately two-thirds of the Polish population in Forster's occupation were classified as Germans.

==== Russians ====
Hitler in Mein Kampf wrote that, "The organization of a Russian state formation was not the result of the political abilities of the Slavs in Russia, but only a wonderful example of the state-forming efficacity of the German element in an inferior race". Hitler ranked Russians as more inferior than Poles in his racial hierarchy.

Influenced by the Guidelines for the Conduct of the Troops in Russia that were issued by the Oberkommando der Wehrmacht (OKW) on 19 May 1941, in a directive sent out to the troops under his command, General Erich Hoepner of the Panzer Group 4 stated:

The war against Russia is an important chapter in the German nation's struggle for existence. It is the old battle of the Germanic against the Slavic people, of the defence of European culture against Muscovite-Asiatic inundation and of the repulse of Jewish Bolshevism. The objective of this battle must be the demolition of present-day Russia and must therefore be conducted with unprecedented severity. Every military action must be guided in planning and execution by an iron resolution to exterminate the enemy remorselessly and totally. In particular, no adherents of the contemporary Russian Bolshevik system are to be spared.

After the invasion of the Soviet Union on 22 June 1941, the Nazis aimed to exterminate the peoples of the Soviet Union. An order by Hitler ordered that the Einsatzgruppen were to execute all Soviet functionaries who were "less valuable Asiatics, Gypsies and Jews". Nazi propaganda depicted the war against the Soviet Union as a racial war between Germans and the Jewish, Romani and Slavic sub-humans. Similarly, it depicted Russians as "Asiatic hordes", "Mongol storm", and "subhumans".

Himmler gave a speech in Stettin to Waffen SS soldiers of the Eastern Front Battle Group "Nord" and said that the war was a battle of "ideologies and struggle races". He argued that it was between Nazism that was based on "the values of our Germanic, Nordic blood" against "the 180 millionth people, a mixture of races and peoples, whose names are unpronounceable" which soldiers should "shoot without pity or mercy" and reminded the soldiers who were fighting in the war that they were fighting against "the same subhumans, against the same inferior races" that had appeared under different names 1,000 years ago, but reminded them that they were now called "Russian under the political banner of Bolshevism".

Goebbels wrote an essay on 19 July 1942 titled "The So-Called Russian Soul" in which he argued that the Russians' stubborn manner was down to their national character being "animalistic". Historian Edmund Dmitrow wrote:

The Nazis constructed and promoted a vision of Russia with the intention of its conquest and colonisation ... Its roots consisted of:

1) anti-Slavism and Great German imperialism directed towards the East;

2) racist, racial-hygiene thinking, social Darwinism and the redemptive and modernisation-focused utopias derived from it;

3) anti-Semitism;

4) chauvinism underpinned by racist categories; and

5) earlier anti-communism and modern anti-Bolshevism as a response to the revolution in Russia

==== Ukrainians ====
Initially after the invasion of the Soviet Union some Ukrainians viewed the German soldiers as "liberators" from the Soviets and some Nazis toyed with the idea of setting up an independent Ukrainian state, but those views were short-lived after the German army began to murder Ukrainians in masses. Hitler and other leading Nazis forbade any Ukrainian independence. Hitler in particular opposed any form of Ukrainian independence since, according to him, their constant oppression by foreign powers meant they were racially inferior and thus worthy of subjugation. Alfred Rosenberg noted in his diary:

The next important, still completely undecided problem is the future of Ukraine. The Führer is of the opinion that if such a large people allow themselves to be constantly oppressed, then it is not worth being recognized by others as independent. Conclusion: it must be treated similarly to the Russian one.

The Reichskommissar in Reichskommissariat Ukraine Erich Koch publicly declared the Ukrainians to be racially inferior and forbade subordinates from having any social contact with Ukrainians. Rosenberg wrote in his diary that Koch labeled the Ostvölker (Eastern Europeans) as being "generally inferior" and said that Ukrainians are a people with "little history worthy of mention." Koch also publicly referred to the Ukrainians as "niggers".

Hitler remarked during the war that the Ukrainians were "every bit as idle, disorganized, and nihilistically Asiatic as the Greater Russians". He also speculated that blue-eyed Ukrainians were descended from ancient German tribes.

Koch on 5 March 1943 said:

We are a master race, which must remember that the lowliest German worker is racially and biologically a thousand times more valuable than the population here.

In 1943, Himmler foresaw the publication of a pamphlet which showed photographs illustrating the alleged racial superiority of the Germans and the racial inferiority of the Ukrainians.

==== Sorbs ====
Under Nazi Germany, Sorbs were described as a German tribe who spoke a Slavic language. Sorbian costume, culture, customs, and the language was said to be no indication of a non-German origin. The Reich declared that there were truly no "Sorbs" or "Lusatians", only Wendish-speaking Germans. As such, while the Sorbs were largely safe from the Reich's policies of ethnic cleansing, the cultivation of "Wendish" customs and traditions was to be encouraged in a controlled manner and it was expected that the Slavic language would decline due to natural causes. Young Sorbs enlisted in the Wehrmacht and were sent to the front. The entangled lives of the Sorbs during World War II are exemplified by the life stories of Mina Witkojc, Měrčin Nowak-Njechorński, and Jan Skala.

Persecution of the Sorbs reached its climax under the Nazis, who attempted to completely assimilate and Germanize them. Their distinct identity and culture and Slavic origins were denied by referring to them as "Wendish-speaking Germans". Under Nazi rule, the Sorbian language and practice of Sorbian culture was banned, Sorbian and Slavic place-names were changed to German ones, Sorbian books and printing presses were destroyed, Sorbian organizations and newspapers were banned, Sorbian libraries and archives were closed, and Sorbian teachers and clerics were deported to German-speaking areas and replaced with German-speaking teachers and clerics. Leading figures in the Sorbian community were forcibly isolated from their community or simply arrested. (Note: "Sorbs inhabiting Upper and Lower Lusatia, whose distinct identity and culture were simply denied by the Nazis, who described them as “Wendish-speaking” Germans and who, toward the end of the war, considered moving the Sorbs en masse to the mining districts of Alsace-Lorraine.".) (Note: "The Nazis intended to assimilate and permanently germanize these 'Wendish-speaking Germans' through integration into the 'National Socialist national community' and through the forbidding of the Sorbian language and manifestations of Sorbian culture, Sorbian and Slav place-names and local names of topographical features (fields, hills and so forth) were germanized, Sorbian books and printing presses confiscated and destroyed, Sorbian schoolteachers and clerics removed and put in German-speaking schools and parishes, and representatives of Sorbian cultural life were either forcibly isolated from their fellows or arrested.") (Note: "[A]fter 1933, under the Nazi regime, the Sorbian community suffered severe repression, and their organizations were banned. Indeed, the very existence of the ethnic group was denied and replaced by the theory of the Sorbs as 'Slavic speaking Germans'. Plans were made to re-settle the Sorbian population in Alsace in order to resolve the 'Lusatian question'. The 12 years of Nazi dictatorship was a heavy blow for a separate Sorbian identity.") (Note: "They pressed Sorbian associations to join Nazi organizations, often with Success, and the Domowina received an ultimatum to adopt a statute which defined it as a 'League of Wendish-speaking Germans'." But the Domowina insisted upon the Slavonic character of the Sorbs. In March 1937 the Nazis forbade the Domowina and the Sorbian papers, all teaching in Sorbian was discontinued, and Sorbian books were removed from the school libraries.") (Note: "[T]he programmatic re-invention of the Sorbian minority as wen- dischsprechende Deutsche under the Nazi regime...") The Sorbian national anthem and flag were banned. The specific Wendenabteilung was established to monitor the assimilation of the Sorbs.

Towards the end of World War II, the Nazis considered the deportation of the entire Sorbian population to the mining districts of Alsace-Lorraine.

=== Romani ===
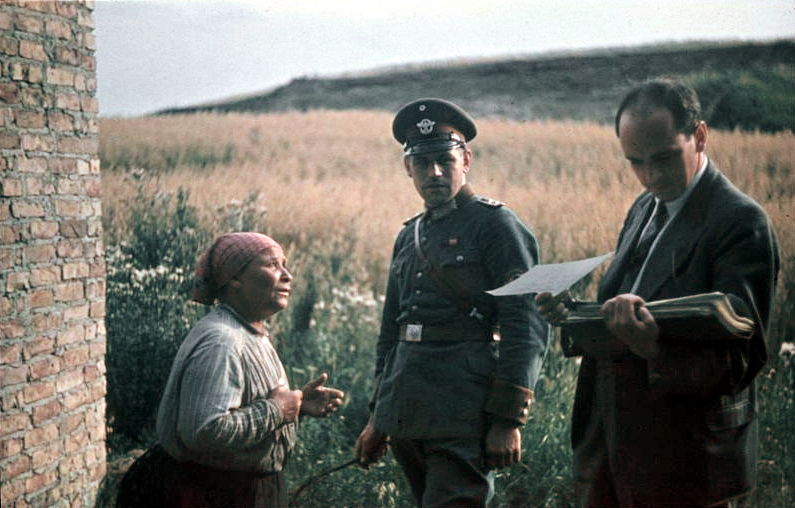
Robert Ritter interviews a Romani woman on 1936 research trip.

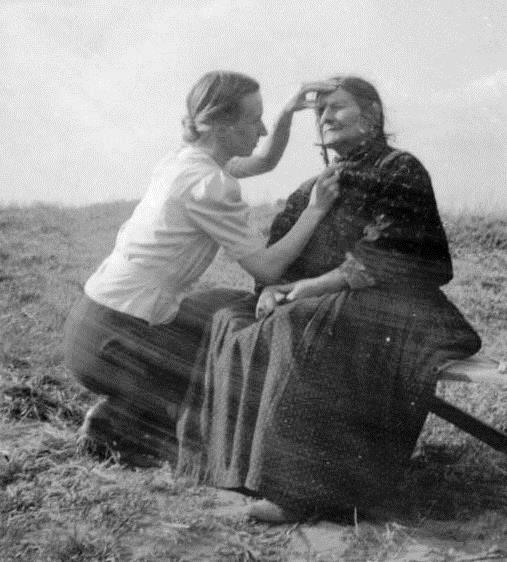
German anthropologist Eva Justin measuring the skull of a Romani woman

The Nazis believed that the Romani were originally Aryans, but over the centuries due to their nomadic lifestyle they had mixed with non-Aryans and therefore regarded them as an "alien race". Romani were subjected to the Nuremberg Laws and were forbidden from having sexual relations and marriages with people of "German or related blood" and were stripped of their citizenship.

The Nazis established the Racial Hygiene and Demographic Biology Research Unit in 1936. It was headed by Robert Ritter and his assistant Eva Justin. This Unit was mandated to conduct an in-depth study of the "Gypsy question (Zigeunerfrage)" and to provide data required for formulating a "Gypsy law".

After extensive fieldwork in the spring of 1936, consisting of interviews and medical examinations to determine the racial classification of the Roma, the Unit decided that most Romani, whom they had concluded were not of "pure Gypsy blood", posed a danger to German racial purity and should be deported or eliminated. No decision was made regarding the remainder (about 10 percent of the total Romani population of Europe), primarily Sinti and Lalleri tribes living in Germany. Several suggestions were made. Himmler suggested deporting the Romani to a remote reservation, as had been done by the United States for its Native Americans, where "pure Gypsies" could continue their nomadic lifestyle unhindered. According to him:

The aim of measures taken by the State to defend the homogeneity of the German nation must be the physical separation of Gypsydom from the German nation, the prevention of miscegenation, and finally, the regulation of the way of life of pure and part-Gypsies. The necessary legal foundation can only be created through a Gypsy Law, which prevents further intermingling of blood, and which regulates all the most pressing questions which go together with the existences of Gypsies in the living space of the German nation.

Although the law Himmler wanted never was enacted, in 1938 he advised that to solve the "Gypsy question" it could be done "on the basis of race".

=== Mixed-Race (Mulatto) & Sub-Saharan Africans ===
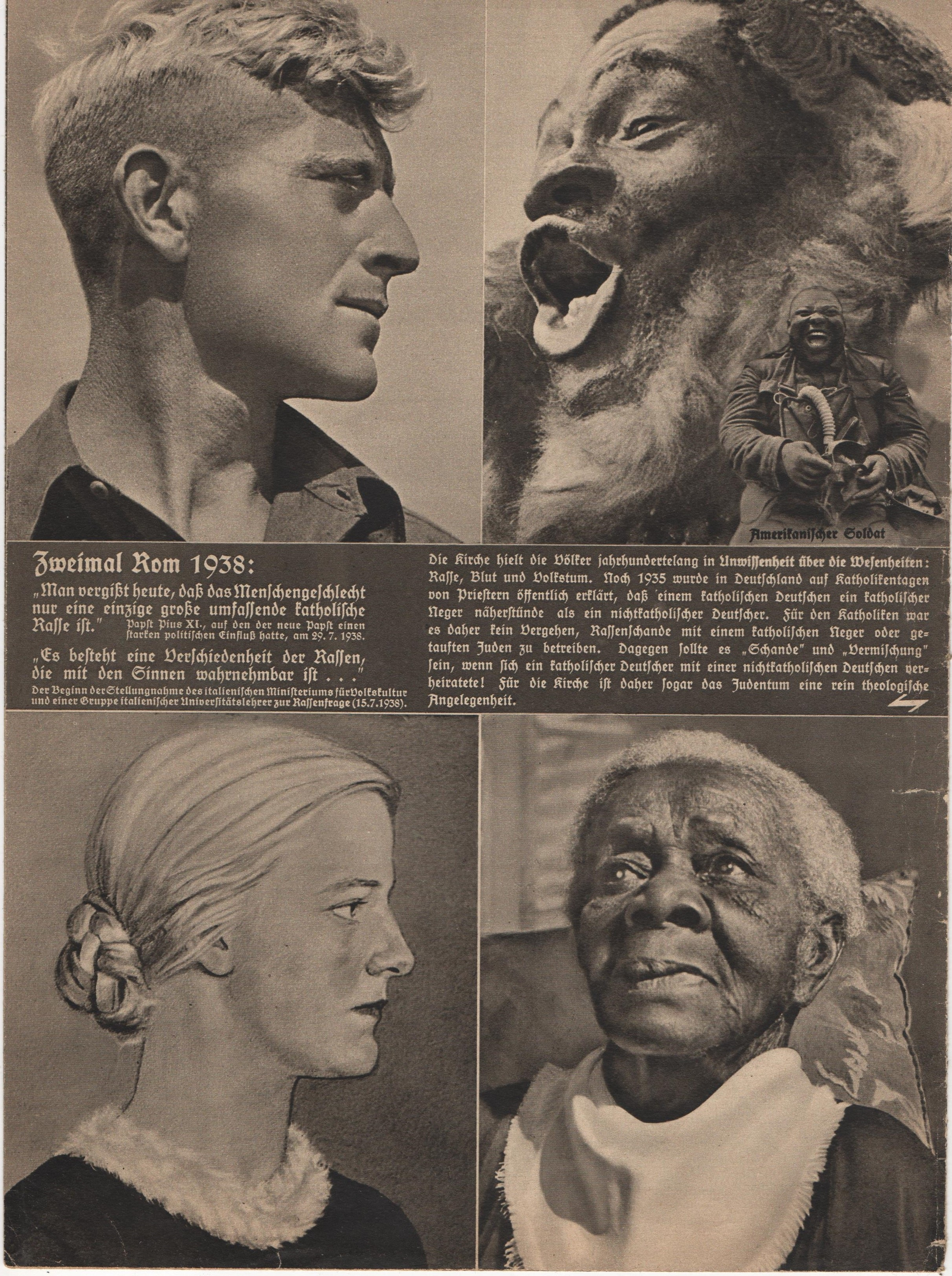
Nazi propaganda showing the difference between Aryan Germans and non-Aryan black people

In Mein Kampf, Hitler described the children who resulted from relationships between European women and French occupation soldiers of African origin as a contamination of the Aryan race "by Negro blood on the Rhine in the heart of Europe." He blamed the Jews for these so-called Rhineland Bastards, writing that "[Jews] were responsible for bringing Negroes into the Rhineland, with the ultimate idea of bastardizing the white race which they hate and thus lowering its cultural and political level so that the Jew might dominate." He also implied that this was a plot on the part of the French, saying the population of France was being increasingly "negrified".

The Nazis banned jazz music because they considered it "corrupt Negro music". The Nazis believed that the existence of jazz in Germany was a Jewish plot to dominate Germany and the non-Jewish German people and destroy German culture.

Nazi eugenicist Eugen Fischer, who was also a professor of anthropology and eugenics, thought that Germany's small black population should be sterilised in order to prevent them from mingling with ethnic German people. In 1937, approximately 400 mixed-ethnic children were forcibly sterilised in the Rhineland.

Black people were subjected to discrimination under the Nuremberg Laws and as a result, they were not allowed to be Reich citizens and they were also forbidden from having sexual relations or marriages with people who were of "German or related blood" (Aryans).

=== Native Americans ===
Nazi Germany was inspired to develop its Lebensraum doctrine by the American doctrine of manifest destiny. Hitler and Himmler were both admirers of the conquest of the Old West and they tried to imitate it in their plans of Drang nach Osten, likening their projects of Generalplan Ost on the Eastern Front to the American Indian Wars, seeking to reconfigure the demography of Eastern Europe (against the Slavs so it would become favorable to Germanics) in the same way that the US reconfigured the demography of North America (against Native Americans so it could become favorable to Anglo-Saxons). Nazi leaders routinely referred to Eastern Europe as "East Germany" or the "Wild East" and sometimes referred to its inhabitants as "Indians". In his book Mein Kampf, Hitler discussed U.S. laws and policies and noted that the United States was a racial model for Europe and that it was "the one state" in the world that was creating the kind of racist society that national socialists wanted, praising the way the "Aryan" US conquered "its own continent" by clearing the "soil" of "natives" to make way for more "racially pure" occupiers and laying the foundation of their economic self-sufficiency and growing global power. Himmler even believed Eastern Europe "could be a paradise, a California of Europe" and Nazi plans called for the removal of tens of millions of German Jews and Poles to Eastern "reservations", that were the Nazi ghettos. According to Holocaust historian Timothy D. Snyder, the United States was "the exemplary land empire" on which the Nazis based their colonizing vision of Eastern Europe. Hitler also spoke of his intention to similarly "Germanize" the east "by the immigration of Germans, and to look upon the natives [slavs] as Redskins." For example, in a 1928 speech, Hitler stated that Americans had "gunned down the millions of Redskins to a few hundred thousand, and now keep the modest remnant under observation in a cage...". The spirit of anti-miscegenation in US Indian law was an inspiration for the 1935 Nuremberg Laws, specially in Heinrich Rieger, Roland Freisler, Herbert Kier, and Johann von Leers. The Nazis frequently referred to "the bloody conquest of the American West [as] the historical warrant [they] needed to justify the clearance of the Slav population." This analogy was used by the Nazis to compare their conquest to the conquest of the Wild West, and it informed their strategies for handling Jews, Polish, Russians, Slavs, and other peoples who were viewed as inferior and, thus, comparable to American Indians as untersmenchen.

However and paradoxically, Nazis pragmatically utilized popular tropes of Indian imagery (Indianthusiasm) to portray Germans as the Indians of Europe, in a sense of asserting the image of Germans as an original indigenous people who were distinct from other Europeans, and to present National Socialism as the political and spiritual manifestation of natural law. So, the imagery of Native Americans was appropriated in Nazi propaganda and used both against the US and to promote a "holistic understanding of Nature" among Germans, which gained widespread support from various segments of the political spectrum in Germany. The connection between anti-American sentiment and sympathetic feelings toward the underprivileged but authentic Indians was common in Germany, and it was to be found among both Nazi propagandists such as Goebbels and left-leaning writers such as Nikolaus Lenau. The pro-Nazi German American Bund tried to persuade Indians not to register for the draft, for example using the swastika with some Native Americans as a symbol depicting good luck in order to gain sympathy. In 1938 the first outdoor Karl May festivals took place at the Rathen Open Air Stage. The influence of Karl May's writing in Hitler youth and German society generated the believe that native people somehow possessed a quasi-Aryan nature. The open-air theater was laid out in 1936, inspired by the ideas of the Thingspiele movement, which was active in the early stages of the Nazi period. The Thingspiele movement failed in staging neopagan and Nordic mythical aspects of the völkisch movement, while May's all-Christian legends found more approval with the mainstream. In general, tried to use May's popularity and his work for their purposes. In the late 1930s, Nazis even attempted to enlist American Indian support, mostly from Sioux and Lakota people. They were interested in exploiting the plight of Indigenous peoples, hoping to incite an uprising by the "hemispheric Indian" against their brutal treatment, creating allies and instability to undermine American arguments for the moral superiority of democracy. Certain Native American advocacy groups, such as the fascist-leaning American Indian Federation, were to be used to undermine the Roosevelt administration from within by means of propaganda. Fictitious reports about Berlin declaring the Sioux as Aryans were circulated by the German-American Bund with the aim of increasing tensions between Native Americans and the government of the United States, impelling Native Americans to resist being drafted or registered by the Bureau of Indian Affairs, Nazi propagandists went as far as declaring that Germany would return expropriated land to the Indians, while Goebbels predicted they possessed little loyalty to America and would rather rebel than fight against Germany; such rumours were reported by commissioner of Indian Affairs John Collier to the Congress as true, thus not merely spreading them further but also legitimating them in the eyes of many. However, Native American authorities, like the Iroquois Confederacy, declared war to Axis powers, based that the racial policy of Nazi Germany and fascism ideology were against their traditional values, also as a protest against Indian New Deal (reclaiming their authority to declare war, independent from US government). The declaration of Sioux supposedly being Aryans resulted from a request by a German immigrant, descended from a Sioux grandmother, for German citizenship. Ruling that the immigrant fell within the pale for citizenship, this declaration stated that Indians were Aryans. However, this was a propaganda move in order to foment unrest among Native American groups in the US, and the Nazis did not actually believe this.

About the pre-hispanic Indigenous peoples of the Americas, the Nazis thought that Andean civilizations (like Tiwanaku Empire, Wari Empire, Chimu Empire, or Inca Empire) were founded by an elite of Aryans who were lost of the historical record, and believing without a doubt that the ancestors of Lake Titicaca's local peoples, the Aymaras and Quechuas, because his rural 'uncivilized' condition, would have been incapable of accomplishing such a magnificent feat. The amateur archeologist and SS commander, Edmund Kiss, proposed that Tiwanaku ruins were built a million years ago by his Aryan ancestors—an ancient Nordic race—who had migrated from the Lost City of Atlantis. Nazi officials seized on Kiss's work and featured the ancient Nordic city of Tiwanaku in party newspapers and Hitler Youth publications. Even Heinrich Himmler wanted to send Kiss, as representative of Ahnenerbe, to lead a trip to Bolivia and demonstrate that Tiwanaku were an ancient Nordic civilization in the Andes that revealed the presence of the Aryan Master Race in prehistoric South America, but that was not possible due to the war.

The exiled French Nazi archaeologist Jacques de Mahieu (member of Charlemagne Division), after settling in Argentina, started to analyze the pre-Hispanic cultures and concluded, throughout his works La Agonía del Dios Sol [The Great Voyage of the Sun-God] and El Rey Vikingo del Paraguay [The Viking King of Paraguay], that a certain Nordic named Ullman (from Slesvig, the southern province of Denmark, and related to the god of hunters, Ull) arrived in Ancient Mexico, around the year 1067 AD in Panuco, and after making contacts with the Aztecs (which adored him as Quetzalcoatl), gradually descended from Mesoamerica across the American continent, to go to found, on South America, the Cara culture, until he settled in present-day Tiahuanaco (in Bolivia), where he established another kingdom (thus denying Aymara legends), the Tiahuanaku civilization, around the middle of the 10th century, which was a "Viking empire" and that was proved by the similarity of Nordic religion and pre-Inca religion, in addition to supposed inscriptions and figures about animals typical of European fauna. Then, after the whites lost their capital by Diaguita invaders in 1290, this Aryan elite fled along the coast to present-day Puerto View on Ecuador, built rafts, and headed for the Oceanian islands. Other Aryans managed to take refuge in the mountains where they rebuilt their forces with the help of loyal tribes and, later, they went down to Cusco where they founded the Inca Empire. Other Aryans hid in the eastern jungles (Amazon rainforest and Gran Chaco) where they would slowly degenerate, but founding Chachapoya culture and Guaraní culture. So, Inca civilization also had to be a Viking empire because of some coincidences in Quechuan languages and Nordic languages, especially because he believed that Inca folklore contained stories (especially those stories which were documented by Inca Garcilaso de la Vega) about viracochas, which he believed were stories about white and bearded men, he also believed that in Paracas (Peru) there was a mummy of a blonde Inca child. All of these pieces of evidence had to be proof of the existence of an Aryan elite of white and bearded Incas who were pure Nordics and constituted a minority with royal blood that ruled over the Indian rabble and constructed great volkisch empires, a claim which could be proven true because the Quechua and Aymara languages supposedly contain proto-German traces [The word Viracocha (the Andean civilizing god) has its alleged roots in the German words wirth (white) and goth (god); and the name Inca comes from the German ing (descendant)]. Mahieu also stated, with the help of German runologist Hermann Munk and Paraguayan historian Vicente Pistilli, that in Paraguay existed a lost Viking empire, saying that they were in the Cuenca del Plata and settled in the 14th century (at least a century before Columbus) and they left traces like the countless of runes he perceived in Cerro Guazú, seeing the Guaraní village as a copy from the Viking fortress, concluding that the Guaraní language was having (apparently) numerous words from the Norse spoken by the Vikings, and appealing that the names collected by the Jesuits – Weibingo, Storting, Tocanguzir, etc. – undoubtedly had to have Viking origins, and being confirmed with the legend of the white apostle.

Other Nazi racial theorists believed that the elites of pre-Hispanic empires may have been Phoenicians, Egyptians, Chinese, Arameans, Celts, Mediterraneans, Semites, or Etruscans, nations of merchants and intrepid navigators which had a superior volk than Native Americans mass of people, this elite (mostly Aryans) gave laws to the Indians, converted them to their religion, taught them agriculture and metallurgy and gave them works of art and architectural, while the mass of Native Americans were untersmensch that were incapable of replicate those prehistoric cities and empires developed by Aryan men who arrived in their lands as representatives of a special civilization from the other side of the sea. That status of the indigenous people as untersmensch was proved after the European colonization of the Americas and the existence of Criollo elites (related to aryans because their Iberian heritage) controllings Latin Americans countries. About mestizo people in Spanish America, neither Hitler nor any other major Nazi leader showed much interest in them, except to warn the German population that they were a clear example of the negative consequences of "racial mixing".

=== Jews ===
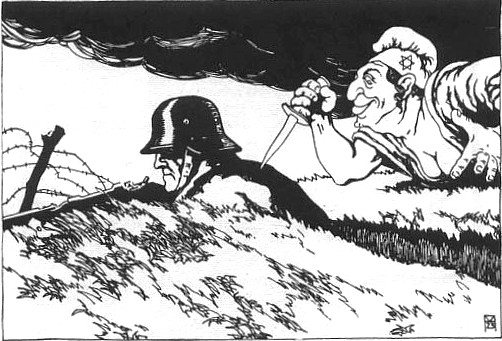
An Austrian postcard in 1919 endorsing the Stab-in-the-back myth by showing a caricatured Jew stabbing a personified German Army soldier in the back with a dagger

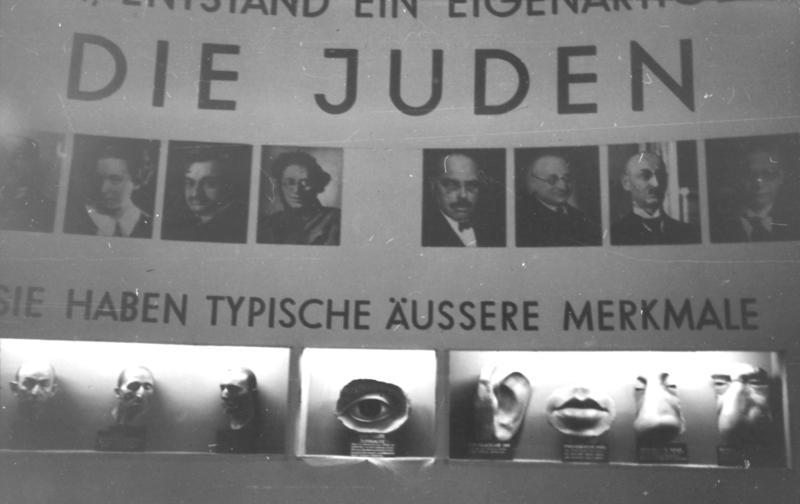
A fragment of the exposition Der Ewige Jude ("The Eternal Jew"), which demonstrates "typical" anatomical traits of the Jews

Hitler shifted the blame for Germany's loss in the First World War upon the "enemies from within". In the face of economic hardship as triggered by the Treaty of Versailles (1919), Jews who resided in Germany were blamed for sabotaging the country. The Nazis, therefore, classified them as the most inferior race and used derogatory terms such as Untermensch (sub-human) and Schwein (pig). Nazi propaganda endorsed the antisemitic Stab-in-the-back conspiracy theory which claimed that the Germans did not lose the First World War, but instead were betrayed by German citizens, especially Jews.

On 24 February 1920, Hitler announced the 25-point Program of the Nazi Party. Point 4 stated, "None but members of the nation may be citizens of the state. None but those of German blood, whatever their creed may be. No Jew, therefore, may be a member of the nation."

In Mein Kampf, Hitler described how Jews lack the necessary idealism to create civilization because they lack creative abilities, instead leveraging the achievements of other races to benefit from. Hitler therefore claimed Jews are a destructive force because of this parasitic intellect, citing this as a reason for why Jews "never had a civilization of [their] own."

Günther wrote extensively about Jews in his racial theory. In his works, for instance, in Rassenkunde des jüdischen Volkes ("Ethnology of the Jewish people"), Günther wrote that Jews predominantly belonged to the "Near Eastern race" (often known as the "Armenoid race"). He thought that Jews had become so racially mixed that they could possibly be regarded as a "race of the second-order". He described Ashkenazi Jews as being a mixture of Near Easterners, Orientals, East Baltic peoples, Inner-Asians, Nordic peoples, Hamites and Negroes, and he described Sephardi Jews as being a mixture of Orientals, Near Easterners, Mediterranean peoples, Hamites, Nordic peoples, and Negroes. Günther argued that the Khazar conversion to Judaism constituted a further external element in the racial makeup of the Ashkenazi Jews, strengthening its Near Eastern component. He also believed that Jews had physical characteristics which were different from the physical characteristics of Europeans. After concluding the racial origins of Jews, Günther began to develop theories about why Jews were so distinguishable as a people and different to European peoples; he wrote that it was because of the way they looked, spoke, gestured and smelled.

In 1934, the Nazis published a pamphlet titled "Why the Aryan Law?" in which they attempted to justify their segregation of non-Jewish Germans from Jewish Germans.

In 1935, the Nazis announced the passage of the Nuremberg Laws which forbade sexual relations and marriages between non-Jewish Germans and Jewish Germans. The laws also stated that Jews were not allowed to employ non-Jewish Germans who were under 45 years old in their households and they also stated that Jews were not allowed to fly the Reich or national flag nor were Jews allowed to display the colors of the Reich.

== Racialist ideology ==
=== Ideology ===
Different Nazis offered a range of pseudo-religious or pseudoscientific arguments to prove that the Aryan race was superior to all other races. The central dogma of Aryan superiority was espoused throughout the party by officials who used scientific racist propaganda. In a May 1930 meeting with Otto Strasser, Adolf Hitler stated:

"The Nordic race is called to dominate the world, and this right must guide our foreign policy. ... an understanding with England is indispensable. We must establish Germano-Nordic domination over Europe and then, with the co-operation of America, over the world."

A person who was deemed to be a "subhuman" would be stripped of all of his/her rights, he or she would be treated like an animal, his or her life would be considered a Lebensunwertes Leben (life unworthy of living) and he or she would only be considered fit for enslavement and extermination.

In schools, Nazi ideology taught German youths to understand the differences which, according to Nazi ideology, existed between the Nordic German "Übermenschen" and the "ignoble" Jewish and Slavic "subhumans". An illustration of this ideology was described in the 1990s by a German-Jewish woman, who vividly recalled hearing Nazis march by her home in central Germany in the mid-1930s while they were singing, "When Jewish blood squirts from my knife." A biography of Lise Meitner says "In the Reichstag the NSDAP deputies stretched their arms in the Nazi salute and sang their party anthem, the Horst Wessellied: "SA marching... Jew blood in the streets".'

Richard Walther Darré, Reich Minister of Food and Agriculture from 1933 to 1942, popularized the expression "Blut und Boden" ("Blood and Soil"), one of the many terms in the Nazi glossary ideologically used to enforce popular racism in the German population. There were many academic and administrative scholars of race who all had somewhat divergent views of racism, including Alfred Rosenberg and Hans F. K. Günther.

Fischer and Lenz were appointed to senior positions overseeing the policy of racial hygiene. The Nazi state used such ideas about the differences between European races as part of their various discriminatory and coercive policies which culminated in the Holocaust.

The first (1916) edition of the American eugenicist Madison Grant's popular book The Passing of the Great Race classified Germans as being primarily Nordic, but the second edition, published after the US had entered WWI, reclassified the now-enemy power as being dominated by "inferior" Alpines, a tradition which was echoed in Harvard Professor of Anthropology Carleton Coon's book The Races of Europe (1939).

Günther's book stated that the Germans are definitely not a fully Nordic people, and it also divided them into Western (Mediterranean), Nordic, Eastern (Alpine), East Baltic and Dinaric races. Hitler himself was later to downplay the importance of Nordicism in public for this very reason. The simplistic tripartite model of Grant which only divided Europeans into Alpine, Mediterranean, and Nordic, Günther did not use this model, and he placed most of the population of Hitler's Germany in the Alpine category, especially after the Anschluss. This model has been used to downplay the Nordic presence in Germany. Günther considered Jews an "Asiatic race inferior to all European races".

Many German nationalists in Weimar Republic viewed the Armenian genocide as a justified act.

J. Kaup led a movement which opposed Günther. Kaup believed that a German nation, all of whose citizens belonged to a "German race" in a populationist sense, offered a more convenient sociotechnical tool than Günther's concept of an ideal Nordic type offered, because according to Günther, only a very few Germans could be considered members of the Nordic race. Nazi legislation identifying the ethnic and "racial" affinities of the Jews reflects the populationist concept of race. Discrimination was not restricted to Jews who belonged to the "Semitic-Oriental-Armenoid" and/or "Nubian–African/Negroid" races, it was also imposed on all members of the Jewish ethnic population.

The German Jewish journalist Kurt Caro, who emigrated to Paris in 1933 and served in the French and British armies, published a book under the pseudonym Manuel Humbert unmasking Hitler's Mein Kampf in which he stated the following racial composition of the Jewish population of Central Europe: 23.8% Lapponoid race, 21.5% Nordic race, 20.3% Armenoid race, 18.4% Mediterranean race, 16.0% Oriental race.

By 1939, Hitler had abandoned Nordicist rhetoric in favor of the idea that as a whole, the German people were united by distinct "spiritual" qualities. Nevertheless, Nazi eugenics policies continued to favor Nordics over Alpines and members of other racial groups, particularly during the war, when decisions about the incorporation of conquered peoples into the Reich were being made. The Lebensborn program sought to extend the Nordic race.

In 1942, Hitler stated the following in private:

I shall have no peace of mind until I have planted a seed of Nordic blood wherever the population stand in need of regeneration. If at the time of the migrations, while the great racial currents were exercising their influence, our people received so varied a share of attributes, these latter blossomed to their full value only because of the presence of the Nordic racial nucleus.

Hitler and Himmler planned to use the SS as the basis for the racial "regeneration" of Europe following the final victory of Nazism. The SS was to be a racial elite chosen on the basis of "pure" Nordic qualities.

Addressing officers of the SS-Leibstandarte "Adolf Hitler" Himmler stated:

The ultimate aim for those 11 years during which I have been the Reichsfuehrer SS has been invariably the same: to create an order of good blood which is able to serve Germany; which unfailingly and without sparing itself can be made use of because the greatest losses can do no harm to the vitality of this order, the vitality of these men, because they will always be replaced; to create an order which will spread the idea of Nordic blood so far that we will attract all Nordic blood in the world, take away the blood from our adversaries, absorb it so that never again, looking at it from the viewpoint of grand policy, Nordic blood, in great quantities and to an extent worth mentioning, will fight against us.

== Philosophy ==
Philosophers and other theoreticians participated in the elaboration of Nazi ideology. The relationship between the German philosopher Martin Heidegger and Nazism has remained a controversial subject in the history of philosophy, even today. According to the philosopher Emmanuel Faye, Heidegger said of Baruch Spinoza that he was "ein Fremdkörper in der Philosophie", a "foreign body in philosophy"—Faye notes that Fremdkörper was a term which belonged to the Nazi glossary, and not to classical German. However, Heidegger did to a certain extent criticize racial science, particularly in his Friedrich Nietzsche lectures, which reject biologism in general, while generally speaking even Heidegger's most German nationalist and pro-Nazi works of the early 30s, such as his infamous Rectorial address, lack any overtly racialized language. Thus it is problematic to connect Heidegger with any racial theory. Carl Schmitt elaborated a philosophy of law praising the Führerprinzip and the German people, while Alfred Baeumler instrumentalized Nietzsche's thought, in particular his concept of the "Will to Power", in an attempt to justify Nazism.

== Propaganda and implementation of racial theories ==
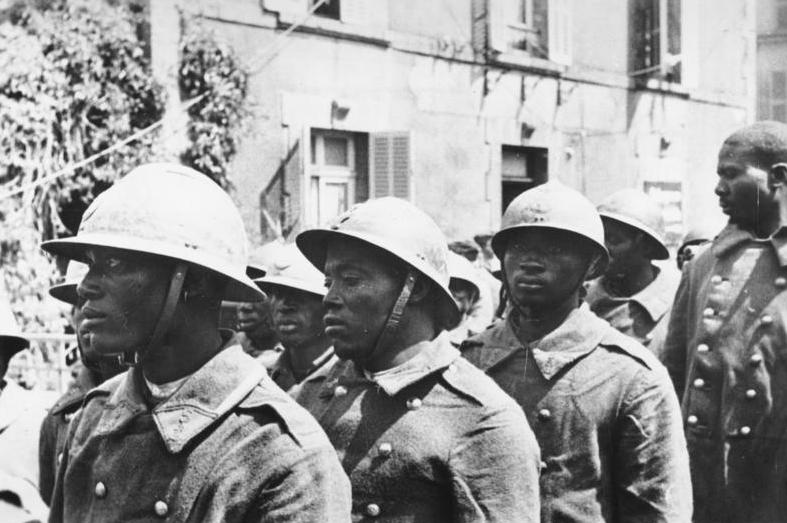
Around 120,000 prisoners of war from French-ruled Africa were captured by the Germans in 1940 during the Battle of France. Unlike other French captives, they were not deported to Germany for fear of racial defilement.

The Nazis developed an elaborate system of propaganda which they used to diffuse their racial theories. Nazi architecture, for example, was used to create the "new order" and improve the "Aryan race". The Nazis also believed that they could use Sports to "regenerate the race" by exposing supposedly inferior peoples, namely the Jews, as slovenly, sedentary and out-of-shape. One of the basic motivations of the Hitler Youth, founded in 1922, was the training of future "Aryan supermen" and future soldiers who would faithfully fight for Nazi Germany.

In 1920, the Nazi Party announced that only Germans of "pure Aryan descent" could become party members and if the person had a partner then he or she also had to be a "racially pure" Aryan. Party members could not be related either directly or indirectly to a so-called "non-Aryan". Nazi Party members and members of other Nazi organisations had to ask permission from their regional party official (Gauleiter) if they wanted to marry people who had two grandparents who were members of the "Czech, Polish, or Magyar Volk groups". German farmers who were Nazi Party members were prohibited from marrying Czechs and Poles in order to "preserve the purity" of their "own racial and ethnic foundations" to prevent the latter from marrying into German farmsteads.

German cinema was used to promote racist theories, under the direction of Goebbels' Propagandaministerium. The German Hygiene Museum in Dresden diffused racial theories. A 1934 poster of the museum shows a man with distinctly African features and reads, "If this man had been sterilized there would not have been born ... 12 hereditarily diseased."(sic). According to the current director Klaus Voegel, "The Hygiene Museum was not a criminal institute in the sense that people were killed here," but "it helped to shape the idea of which lives were worthy and which were worthless".

Nazi racial theories were soon translated into legislation, the most notable pieces of legislation were the July 1933 Law for the Prevention of Hereditarily Diseased Offspring and the 1935 Nuremberg Laws. The Aktion T4 euthanasia program, in which the Kraft durch Freude (KdF, literally "Strength Through Joy") youth organization participated, targeted people accused of representing a danger of "degeneration" towards the "Deutsches Volk". Under the race laws, sexual relations between Aryans (cf. Aryan certificate) and non-Aryans known as Rassenschande ("race defilement") became punishable by law.

To preserve the "racial purity" of the German blood, after the beginning of the war the Nazis extended the race defilement law to include all foreigners (non-Germans).

Despite the laws against Rassenschanden, German soldiers raped Jewish women during the Holocaust.

The Nazi regime called for all German people who wanted to be citizens of the Reich to produce proof of Aryan ancestry. Certain exceptions were made when Hitler issued the "German Blood Certificate" for those people who were classified to be of partial Aryan and Jewish ancestry by the race laws.

During World War II, Germanization efforts were carried out in Central and Eastern Europe in order to cull those people of "German blood" who lived there. This started with the classification of people into the Volksliste. Those people who were considered German and selected for inclusion in the Volksliste were either kidnapped and sent to Germany to undergo Germanization, or they were killed in order to prevent "German blood" from being used against the Nazis. In regions of Poland, many Poles were either murdered or deported in order to make room for Baltic Germans induced to emigrate after the pact with the USSR. Efforts were made to identify people of German descent with Nordic traits from pre-war citizens of Poland. If these individuals passed the screening process test and were considered "racially valuable", they were abducted from their parents to be Germanized and then sent to Germany to be raised as Germans. Those children who failed such tests might be used as subjects in medical experiments or as slave laborers in German industry.

Western countries, such as France, were treated less harshly because they were viewed as racially superior to the "subhuman" Poles who were to be enslaved and exterminated, though they were not considered as good as full Germans were; a complex of racial categories was boiled down by the average German to mean that "East is bad and West is acceptable." Still, extensive racial classification was practiced in France, for future uses.

== Bibliography ==
- Alexiev, Alex (1982). Soviet Nationalities in German Wartime Strategy, 1941–1945. Rand Corporation. ISBN 0833004247.
- Aly, Götz (1994). Cleansing the Fatherland: Nazi Medicine and Racial Hygiene. JHU Press. ISBN 9780801848247.
- Asgharzadeh, Ailreza (2007). Iran and the Challenge of Diversity: Islamic Fundamentalism, Aryanist Racism, and Democratic Struggles. Palgrave Macmillan US. ISBN 978-1349538850.
- Askin, Kelly Dawn (1997). War Crimes Against Women: Prosecution in International War Crimes Tribunals. Martinus Nijhoff Publishers. ISBN 978-90-411-0486-1.
- Bankier, David; Gutman, Israel (2009). Nazi Europe and the Final Solution. Berghahn Books. ISBN 978-1845454104.
- Bartov, Omer (1992). Hitler's Army: Soldiers, Nazis, and War in the Third Reich: Soldiers, Nazis and War in the Third Reich. Oxford University Press. ISBN 9780195068795.
- Baynes, Norman H. (1994). The Speeches of Adolf Hitler, April 1922 – August 1939. Oxford University Press.
- Bendersky, Joseph W. (2013). A Concise History of Nazi Germany. Rowman & Littlefield Publishers, Inc. ISBN 978-1442222694.
- Biddiss, Michael D (1970). Father of Racist Ideology: The Social and Political Thought of Count Gobineau. New York: Weybright and Talley.
- Berenbaum, Abraham; Peck (2002). The Holocaust and History The Known, the Unknown, the Disputed, and the Reexamined. Indiana University Press. ISBN 0253215293.
- Bishop, Chris; Williams, Michael (2003). SS: Hell on the Western Front. Saint Paul, Minnesota: MBI Publishing. ISBN 978-0-7603-1402-9.
- Black, Peter; Gutmann, Martin (2016) [2016]. "Racial theory and realities of conquest in the Occupied East: The Nazi leadership and non-German nationals in the SS and police". In Böhler, Jochen; Gerwarth, Robert (eds.). The Waffen-SS: A European History. Oxford: Oxford University Press. pp. 16–41. doi:10.1093/acprof:oso/9780198790556.003.0002. ISBN 9780198790556. OCLC 970401339. S2CID 157309772.
- Bryant, Chad (2009). Prague in Black: Nazi Rule and Czech Nationalism. Harvard University Press. ISBN 978-0674034594.
- Bullock, Alan (1991). Hitler and Stalin: Parallel Lives. HarperCollins Publishers Ltd. ISBN 0006861989.
- Bullock, Alan (1990). Hitler: A Study in Tyranny. Penguin Books. ISBN 0140135642.
- Burleigh, Michael (1999). Confronting the Nazi Past: New Debates on Modern German History. Collins & Brown. ISBN 1855854112.
- Burleigh, Michael (2002). Germany Turns Eastwards: A Study of Ostforschung in the Third Reich. ISBN 0330488406.
- Burleigh, Michael (1991). The Racial State: Germany 1933–1945. Cambridge University Press. ISBN 0521398029.
- Burleigh, Michael (2001). The Third Reich. ISBN 9780330487573.
- Ceran, Tomasz (2020). The History of a Forgotten German Camp: Nazi Ideology and Genocide. Bloomsbury Academic. ISBN 978-1350155374.
- Chapoutot, Johann (2016). Greeks, Romans, Germans: How the Nazis Usurped Europe's Classical Past. Univ of California Press. ISBN 978-0520292970.
- Childs, Harwood L. (2007) [1938]. The Nazi Primer: Official Handbook for Schooling the Hitler Youth [Handbuch für die Schulungsarbeit in der HJ.: vom deutschen Volk und seinem Lebensraum]. ASIN B013J992NE.
- Connelly, John (1999). "Nazis and Slavs: From Racial Theory to Racist Practice". Central European History. 32 (1). Cambridge University Press: 1–33. doi:10.1017/S0008938900020628. PMID 20077627. S2CID 41052845.
- Curta, Florin (2001). The Making of the Slavs: History and Archaeology of the Lower Danube Region, c. 500–700. Cambridge: Cambridge University Press. ISBN 9781139428880.
- Dallin, Alexander (1981). German Rule in Russia, 1941–1945. Palgrave Macmillan UK. ISBN 0333216954.
- Ehrenreich, Eric (2007). The Nazi Ancestral Proof: Genealogy, Racial Science, and the Final Solution. Bloomington: Indiana University Press. ISBN 978-0-253-11687-1.
- Evans, Richard J. (2004). The Coming of the Third Reich: How the Nazis Destroyed Democracy and Seized Power in Germany. Penguin. ISBN 0141009756.
- Evans, Richard J. (2009). The Third Reich at War: How the Nazis Led Germany from Conquest to Disaster. Penguin. ISBN 978-0141015484.
- Evans, Richard J. (2006). The Third Reich in Power, 1933–1939: How the Nazis Won Over the Hearts and Minds of a Nation. Penguin Books. ISBN 0141009764.
- Fischel, Jack R. (2010). Historical Dictionary of the Holocaust. Scarecrow Press. ISBN 978-0810867741.
- Frøland, Carl Müller (2020). Understanding Nazi Ideology: The Genesis and Impact of a Political Faith. McFarland, Inc., Publishers. ISBN 978-1476678306.
  - Frøland, Carl Müller (2023). Nazi Universe (in Hindi) (1 ed.). India: Rajmangal Publishers. p. 504. ISBN 978-9394920293.
- Friedländer, Saul (2007). Nazi Germany And The Jews: The Years Of Persecution: 1933–1939. ISBN 9780753801420.
- Friedländer, Saul (2008). Nazi Germany And the Jews: The Years Of Extermination: 1939–1945. Phoenix. ISBN 978-0753824450.
- Fritz, Stephen G. (1997). Frontsoldaten: The German Soldier in World War II. University Press of Kentucky. ISBN 0813109434.
- Gellately, Robert (2002). Backing Hitler: Consent And Coercion In Nazi Germany. Oxford University Press. ISBN 0192802917.
- Gellately, Robert (1992). The Gestapo and German Society: Enforcing Racial Policy 1933–1945. Clarendon Press. ISBN 0198202970.
- Gerlach, Christian (2016). The Extermination of the European Jews. Cambridge University Press. ISBN 9780521706896.
- Gilman, Sander; Rabinbach, Anson (2013). The Third Reich Sourcebook. University of California Press. ISBN 978-0520276833.
- Glantz, David; Heiber, Helmut; Weinberg, Gerhard L. (2004). Hitler And His Generals: Military Conferences 1942–1945 from Stalingrad to Berlin. Enigma Books. ISBN 1929631286.
- Glaser, Konstanze (2007). Minority Languages and Cultural Diversity in Europe: Gaelic and Sorbian Perspectives. Multilingual Matters. ISBN 9781853599323.
- Goldstein, Ivo; Goldstein, Slavko (2016). The Holocaust in Croatia. Pittsburgh: University of Pittsburgh Press. ISBN 9780822944515.
- Golecka, Aneta (2003). "Serbołużyczanie w Niemczech". Annales Universitatis Mariae Curie-Skłodowska. Sectio K, Politologia (in Polish). X. Wydawnictwo Uniwersytetu Marii Curie-Skłodowskiej w Lublinie.
- Gumkowkski, Janusz; Leszczynski, Kazimierz (1961). Poland Under Nazi Occupation. ASIN B0006BXJZ6. Archived from the original on 5 December 2012.
- Günther, Hans F. K. (1927). The Racial Elements of European History.
- Hale, Christopher (2009). Himmler's Crusade. Penguin Random House. ISBN 978-0553824278.
- Heinemann, Isabel (2003). Rasse, Siedlung, deutsches Blut: Das Rasse- und Siedlungshauptamt der SS und die rassenpolitische Neuordnung Europas (in German). Wallstein Verlag. ISBN 3892446237.
- Herbert, Ulrich (1997). Hitler's Foreign Workers: Enforced Foreign Labor in Germany Under the Third Reich. Cambridge University Press. ISBN 9780521470001.
- Herbert, Ulrich (2000). National Socialist Extermination Policies: Contemporary German Perspectives and Controversies. Berghahn Books. ISBN 1571817514.
- Herf, Jeffrey (2008a). Jewish Enemy: Nazi Propaganda during World War II and the Holocaust. Harvard University Press. ISBN 978-0674027381.
- Herf, Jeffrey (2008b). "Nazi Germany and the Arab and Muslim World: Old and New Scholarship" (PDF). Boston University.
- Herf, Jeffrey (2011). Nazi Propaganda for the Arab World: With a New Preface. Yale University Press. ISBN 978-0300168051.
- Herzstein, Robert Edwin (1978). The war that Hitler won: The most infamous propaganda campaign in history. Putnam. ISBN 0399118454.
- Hiro, Dilip (1987). Iran Under the Ayatollahs. Routledge & Kegan Paul Inc. ISBN 9780710211231.
- Hirsch, Martin; Majer, Diemut; Meinck, Jürgen (1984). Recht, Verwaltung und Justiz im Nationalsozialismus ausgewählte Schriften, Gesetze und Gerichtsentscheidungen von 1933 bis 1945 (in German). Bund-Verlag. ISBN 9783766305411.
- Hitler, Adolf (2003) [1928]. Hitler's Second Book. Translated by Weinberg, Gerhard L. Enigma. ISBN 1929631162.
- Hitler, Adolf (1953) [1941–1944]. Hitler's Table Talk: His Private Conversations. Translated by Cameron, Norman; Stevens, R. H. Weidenfeld and Nicolson. ASIN B0007K8398.
- Hitler, Adolf (1992) [1925]. Mein Kampf. Translated by Manheim, Ralph. Pimlico. ISBN 071265254X.
- Hodkinson, Stephen; Morris, Ian Macgregor (2010). Sparta in Modern Thought: Politics, History and Culture. Classical Press of Wales. ISBN 978-1905125470.
- Höpp, Gerhard (2010). "The Suppressed Discourse: Arab Victims of National Socialism". The World in World Wars: Experiences, Perceptions and Perspectives from Africa and Asia. Koninklijke Brill NV. ISBN 9789004185456.
- Hutton, Christopher (2005). Race and the Third Reich: Linguistics, Racial Anthropology and Genetics in the Dialectic of Volk. Polity. ISBN 0745631770.
- Ihrig, Stefan (2014). Ataturk in the Nazi Imagination. Harvard University Press. ISBN 978-0674368378.
- Kershaw, Ian (2001). Hitler 1936–1945: Nemesis. National Geographic Books. ISBN 0140272399.
- Kershaw, Ian (2008). Stalinism and Nazism: Dictatorships in Comparison. Cambridge University Press. ISBN 978-0521565219.
- Kroener, Bernhard R.; Muller, Rolf-Dieter; Osers, Ewald; Umbreit, Hans (2015). Germany and the Second World War: Volume V/I: Organization and Mobilization of the German Sphere of Power: Wartime Administration, Economy, and Manpower Resources, 1939–1941. Oxford University Press. ISBN 978-0198738299.
- King, Jeremy (2005). Budweisers into Czechs and Germans: A Local History Of Bohemian Politics, 1848–1948. Princeton University Press. ISBN 0691122342.
- Koonz, Claudia (2005). The Nazi Conscience. Harvard University Press. ISBN 0674018427.
- Kühl, Stefan (1994). The Nazi Connection: Eugenics, American Racism, and German National Socialism. New York: Oxford University Press. ISBN 0195149785.
- Lepage, Jean-Denis G.G (2009). Hitler Youth, 1922–1945: An Illustrated History. McFarland, Inc., Publishers. ISBN 978-0786439355.
- Lepre, George (1997). Himmler's Bosnian Division: The Waffen-SS Handschar Division 1943–1945. Atglen, Philadelphia: Schiffer Publishing. ISBN 978-0-7643-0134-6.
- Lewy, Guenter (2001). The Nazi Persecution of the Gypsies. Oxford University Press, USA. ISBN 0195125568.
- Lombardo, Paul A. (2002). "'The American Breed': Nazi Eugenics and the Origins of the Pioneer Fund". Albany Law Review. 65 (3): 743–830. PMID 11998853.
- Longerich, Peter (2011). Heinrich Himmler: A Life. Palgrave Macmillan US. ISBN 978-0230112735.
- Lusane, Clarence (2003). Hitler's Black Victims: The Historical Experiences of European Blacks, Africans and African Americans During the Nazi Era. Psychology Press. ISBN 0415932955.
- Majer, Diemut (2014). "Non-Germans" Under the Third Reich: The Nazi Judicial and Administrative System in Germany and Occupied Eastern Europe with Special Regard to Occupied Poland 1939–1945. Texas Tech University Press. ISBN 978-0896728370.
- May, Werner (1934). The German National Catechism [Deutscher National-Katechismus].
- Mazower, Mark (2009). Hitler's Empire: Nazi Rule in Occupied Europe. Penguin Books. ISBN 978-0141011929.
- Mineau, André (2004). Operation Barbarossa: Ideology and Ethics Against Human Dignity. Rodopi. ISBN 9042016337.
- Motadel, David (2014a). Islam and Nazi Germany's War. Cambridge, Massachusetts: The Belknap Press of Harvard University Press. ISBN 978-0-67472-460-0.
- Motadel, David (2014b). "Iran and the Aryan myth". In Ansari, Ali M. (ed.). Perceptions of Iran: history, myths and nationalism from medieval Persia to the Islamic Republic (PDF). International library of Iranian studies. London: I.B. Tauris in association with the Iran Heritage Foundation. pp. 119–145. ISBN 978-1-84885-830-5 – via www.davidmotadel.com.
- Neuburger, Mary C. (4 October 2012). Balkan Smoke: Tobacco and the Making of Modern Bulgaria. Cornell University Press. ISBN 978-0-8014-6550-5.
- Nicholas, Lynn H. (2006). Cruel World: The Children of Europe in the Nazi Web. Vintage Books. ISBN 0-679-77663-X.
- Nicosia, Francis R. (2015). Nazi Germany and the Arab World. Cambridge University Press. ISBN 978-1-107-06712-7.
- Padfield, Peter (2001). Himmler: Reichsführer-SS. ISBN 978-0304358397.
- Paterson, Lawrence (2016). Hitler's Grey Wolves: U-Boats in the Indian O cean. Pen & Sword Books Limited. ISBN 978-1473882737.
- Perry, Michael (2012). World War II in Europe A Concise History. Cengage Learning. ISBN 978-1111836528.
- Pohl, Dieter (2008). Verfolgung und Massenmord in der NS-Zeit 1933–1945 (in German). Wissenschaftliche Buchgesellschaft. ISBN 9783534217571.
- Poliakov, Leon (1974). Aryan Myth: A History of Racist and Nationalist Ideas in Europe. New York: Basic Books. ISBN 0465004520.
- Proctor, Robert N. (1989). Racial Hygiene: Medicine Under the Nazis. Harvard University Press. ISBN 0674745787.
- Pynsent, Robert [in Czech] (2000). The Phoney Peace: Power and Culture in Central Europe, 1945-49. School of Slavonic and East European Studies. ISBN 9780903425018.
- Ramet, Sabrina P. (2016). Alternatives to Democracy in Twentieth-Century: Collectivist Visions of Alternative Modernity. Central European University Press. ISBN 9789633863107.
- Read, Anthony (2004). The Devil's Disciples. Pimlico. ISBN 0712664165.
- Rees, Laurence (1997). The Nazis: A Warning from History. ASIN B002F123FM.
- Rich, Norman (1974). Hitler's War Aims: The Establishment of the New Order. WW Norton & Co. ASIN B006DUFW0E.
- Payne, Stanley G. (2003). History of Fascism, 1914–1945. Univ of Wisconsin Press. ISBN 0299148742.
- Schmitz-Berning, Cornelia (2010). Vokabular des Nationalsozialismus (in German). Walter de Gruyter. ISBN 9783110928648.
- Shirer, William (1991). Rise and Fall of the Third Reich. Arrow. ISBN 9780099421764.
- Stein, George H. (1984). The Waffen SS: Hitler's Elite Guard at War, 1939–45. Ithaca, New York: Cornell University Press. ISBN 978-0-8014-9275-4.
- Steinweis, Alan E. (2006). Studying the Jew: Scholarly Antisemitism in Nazi Germany. Cambridge, MA: Harvard University Press. ISBN 9780674022058.
- Stephenson, Jill (2006). Hitler's Home Front: Wurttemberg Under the Nazis. A&C Black. ISBN 1852854421.
- Stuckart, Wilhelm (1935). Die völkische Grundordnung des deutschen Volkes (in German).
- Weinberg, Gerhard L.; Trevor-Roper, H.R., eds. (1 December 2007) [1953]. Hitler's Table Talk: 1941–1944. Translated by Cameron, Norman; Stevens, R.H. Enigma Books. ISBN 978-1-929631-66-7.
- The Group (1993). Minority Rights Group International Report. Minority Rights. ISBN 9781897693001.
- Tomasevich, Jozo (2001). War and Revolution in Yugoslavia, 1941–1945: Occupation and Collaboration. Vol. 2. San Francisco, California: Stanford University Press. ISBN 978-0-8047-7924-1.
- Tucker, William (2002). The Funding of Scientific Racism: Wickliffe Draper and the Pioneer Fund. Urbana, IL: University of Illinois Press.
- Liulevicius, Vejas Gabriel (2011). The German Myth of the East: 1800 to the Present. OUP Oxford. ISBN 978-0199605163.
- Timm, Annette F. (2010). The Politics of Fertility in Twentieth-Century Berlin. Cambridge University Press. ISBN 978-0521195393.
- Towle, Philip (1999). Japanese Prisoners of War. A&C Black. ISBN 1852851929.
- Weiss-Wendt, Anton (2010). Eradicating Differences: The Treatment of Minorities in Nazi-Dominated Europe. Cambridge Scholars Publishing Limited. ISBN 978-1-4438-2368-5.
- Weiss-Wendt, Anton (2013). Racial Science in Hitler's New Europe, 1938–1945. U of Nebraska Press. ISBN 978-0803245075.
- Weikart, Richard (2011). Hitler's Ethic: The Nazi Pursuit of Evolutionary Progress. Palgrave Macmillan US. ISBN 978-0230112735.
- Wegner, Bernd (1997). From Peace to War: Germany, Soviet Russia, and the World, 1939–1941. Berghahn Books. ISBN 1571818820.
- Winstone, Martin (2020). The Dark Heart of Hitler's Europe: Nazi Rule in Poland Under the General Government. Bloomsbury Academic. ISBN 978-1350200135.
- Zank, W. (1998). The German Melting Pot: Multiculturality in Historical Perspective. Springer. ISBN 9780230375208.
