= Nordic Indo-Germanic People =

Mythological antecedence of the Germanic people

The Nordic Indo-Germanic people is a mythological group, from which the Germanic peoples allegedly descended. The assumption of the existence of this primordial people was developed by nationalists in the German territories from the early 19th century onwards, and was the subject of intense research in both the 19th and 20th centuries. Nineteenth-century German philologists, ethnologists and historians initially focused their research on the Eastern origins of Germanic populations. Then, in a second phase, these researchers (or their followers) changed the focus of their work to demonstrate the Nordic origin of Germanic populations and civilization. These results were soon deliberately exploited in the debate on German identity that raged throughout the nineteenth century.

From the 1920s onwards, the results of research and speculation on this hypothetical people were used by the Pan-German extremists such as the Nazis in Germany to claim immense territories for the German nation, the nucleus of a future Greater German Reich. These territories, which the Third Reich claims to have been occupied in the past by Indo-Germanic populations, are intended to constitute the "living space" of the Greater Germanic people, gathered around its German core, and to support the policy of maintaining the Nordic-Aryan "race purity", through a systematic hunt for those possessing the "lost Germanic genes" so dear to Heinrich Himmler.

== Indo-European and Indo-Germanic peoples ==
=== The birth and spread of Indo-European studies ===
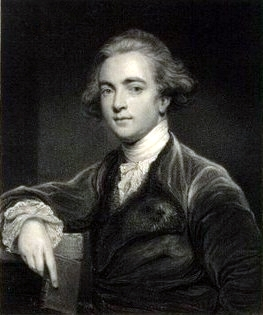
William Jones notes the linguistic proximity between Sanskrit and European languages, enabling the development of Indo-European studies.

In the 1780s, William Jones, an English civil servant stationed in India, became interested in the linguistic proximity between existing and "dead" Sanskrit and European languages, such as English, French, Latin or Greek, in the context of Europe's infatuation with India.

All these languages appear to be close to one another, and Sanskrit is the oldest of them all; it seems clear, first to William Jones, then to 19th-century linguists and philologists, that Sanskrit is the original language of all the languages spoken in Europe, and that it spread through the migrations of conquest of its speakers.

The idea of the Indian origins of the peoples of Western Europe was rapidly gaining ground across the European continent, and more specifically in German-speaking countries strongly marked by a long French military and political presence.

=== Lexical innovations ===
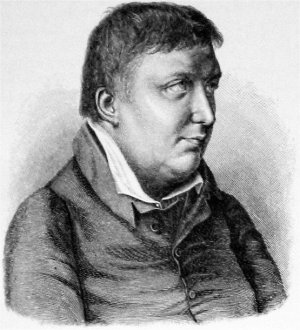
In 1819, Friedrich Schlegel developed the term "Aryans" from Sanskrit.

William Jones' hypotheses soon spread, forcing scientists to formulate his discoveries more precisely.

The term "Indo-Germanic" in the sense of "Indo-European" was invented by Conrad Malte-Brun, a geographer of Danish origin who worked in Paris and published in French. Used in his Précis de la géographie universelle (1810), it was intended to encompass the Indo-European languages in their geographical distribution on the Eurasian continent: with Indian as the most southeasterly language and Germanic (Icelandic) as the most northwesterly Indo-European language group, it designated the speakers of the original Indo-European language, giving it an ethnic dimension that it retained until the 1850s. It was then under the joint influence of Gustav Klemm, author of Histoire culturelle générale de l'Humanité, Joseph Arthur de Gobineau and Adolf Bastian that the concept acquired its racial dimension.

Popularized by Prussian-born orientalist Julius Klaproth, the term "Indo-Germain" is used to better describe the linguistic group previously known as "Scythian". The term first appeared in 1823 in Klaproth's Asia Polyglotta. The hypothesis of the Eastern origin of civilization was quickly adopted by the Germans: Hegel and Jacob Grimm, for example, proposed numerous variations.

In 1819, Friedrich Schlegel coined the term Aryans to designate the invaders from India, from the Sanskrit arya, translated as noble. However, this infatuation was largely due to the ignorance of the literati of the time, who favored an account of the myth of origins over a more or less loose weave of suppositions.

=== A northward shift ===
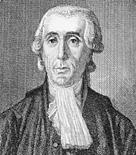
Jean-Sylvain Bailly was the first to defend the thesis of the Nordic origin of Germanic populations.

In the second half of the 19th century, the hypothesis of the Indian origin of Germanic populations was called into question, and a translation took place: from the Indian, the Aryan race became Nordic, with the North perceived as the second source of the Nordic Indo-Germanic race.

This thesis, developed in the late eighteenth century by Jean-Sylvain Bailly, was rapidly marginalized and considered unserious by the astronomer's contemporaries; (Note: At the time, Jean-Sylvain Bailly was a renowned astronomer.) however, it was popularized in Germany in the 1920s and 1930s by Hans Günther, giving, according to Johann Chapoutot, academic visibility to the Nordic hypothesis of the origin of European civilization, in total opposition to the hypothesis of Asian origin that had prevailed until then.

== The Indogermans, a National Socialist myth of origins ==
=== Alleged history and social organization ===
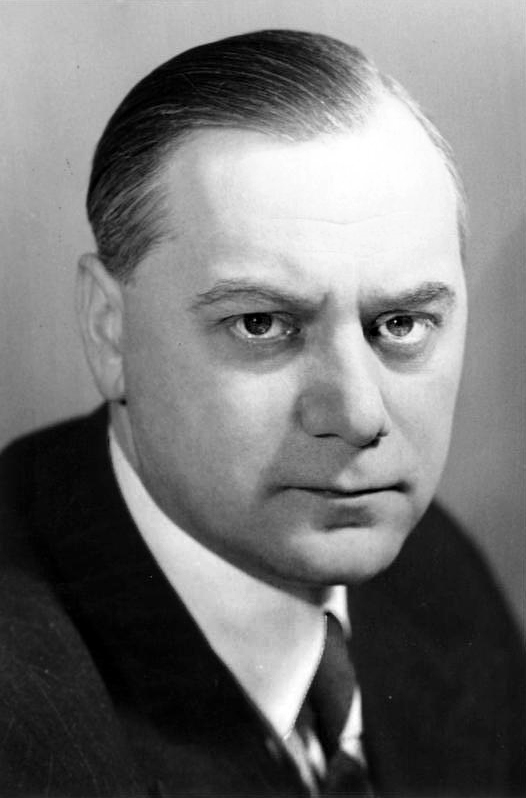
In his writings, Alfred Rosenberg developed a personal vision of the history of the Indogermans.

The academic visibility of the Nordicist thesis has encouraged its promoters to develop a vision of this hypothetical people, conducive to a wide range of scientific research.

As a group of people looking for a territory to develop, the Indogermans allegedly moved in waves. German archaeologists have identified fourteen such waves. Parallel to this hypothesis, Nazi anthropologists and politicians such as Alfred Rosenberg, Richard Darré and Wilhelm Frick developed a number of theories on the history of Indo-Germanic populations, which may or may not have been included in school textbooks of the period.

Thus, in 1937, in a speech delivered at the university of Lübeck, Alfred Rosenberg outlined the history of the northern Indo-Germanic peoples, while at the same time undermining the hypothesis of an Asian origin: in his view, the Aryans originated in northern Europe, more precisely in the Lübeck region, and spread their settlement area in waves throughout the Old World.While Rosenberg defends the Nordic origin hypothesis, he is unable to avoid mentioning research into a possible Atlantis origin of the Indo-Germanics. During the 1920s and 1930s, speculations on the Atlantis origin of Aryan populations abounded, encouraged by Himmler himself, with the Heligoland archipelago a recurring theme. However, this theory was quickly dismissed, despite the Reichsführer's insistence, and remained largely speculative, mainly due to a lack of evidence. (Note: The outbreak of war called into question the organization of underwater excavation campaigns.)

=== A population of sedentary farmers ===
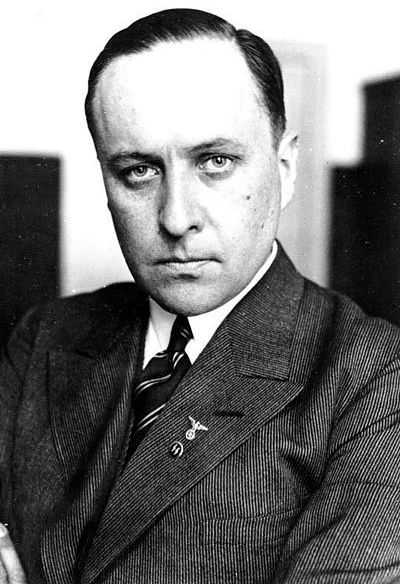
Richard Darré asserts that the Indo-Germanic Nordic populations were sedentary farmers, moving in search of new lands.

Richard Darré, the völkisch author of Peasantry as the Source of Life of the Nordic Race, takes up the thesis of a sedentary population settled on lands conquered through successive migrations and wars. As conquerors, they would have set out from southern Sweden or northern Germany to conquer the Mediterranean rim. Defining the Indogermans as both sedentary and agricultural, but in search of land to cultivate, Darré justifies this contradiction - sedentariness on the one hand, and migrations in search of land on the other - by proposing a personal interpretation of the ver sacrum ritual. The ver sacrum ritual, originally a simple offering of spring fruits, was originally a Roman migration ritual directly inherited from Nordic rites, as he deduces from a comparison of the Scandinavian and Roman agrarian calendars. Originally a population of farming warriors, the Indo-Germans would have become nomads out of necessity: in fact, constantly in search of land to develop through agriculture, the Indo-Germans would have stayed away from the cities, during the Dorian migrations, and then during the Germanic migrations of late Antiquity. The northern Indo-Germans, the Dorians and the Germans, would have preferred to settle in the countryside for the long term, leaving the cities to those already settled. As a corollary of the victorious ver sacrum, according to Darré, the taking of possession of the land went hand in hand with the enslavement of the native populations, following the Spartan model.

According to Hans Günther, nicknamed "Rassengünther" ("Race Günther") by the SS, the arrival of Indo-Germanic-Nordic populations in a given territory led to the coexistence of multiple artistic influences. Different forms of art coexisted: some noble ones, such as sculpture, were used by the conquerors to spread the Indo-Germanic-Nordic aesthetic canons, while other less noble ones, such as handicrafts and pottery, were practised on an ongoing basis by populations long settled in these territories and subjugated by the Nordic conquerors.

=== Conqueror people ===
According to the ideas developed by racial ideologists, the Indo-Germanic Nordic people, by expanding their territory, are obeying the laws of humanity. Indeed, they believed that it was the duty of a population to multiply, and, to cope with this demographic surplus, to expand the territories under their control, most often firstly through agrarian colonization, and then, secondly, through the establishment of societies sensitive to the arts, creating masterpieces destined to endure through the centuries.

The Nazi Party intellectuals were not the only ones to propose a history of this mythical and hypothetical original Germanic population. School and university textbooks of the period, aimed at young people destined to take part in the Second World War, took up the historical reconstructions of National Socialist intellectuals and painted a striking picture of the supposed history of the Indo-Germans. During the Bronze Age, in the 5th millennium BC, the first waves of northern Indo-Germanic migration were allegedly recorded in Africa and Mesopotamia. According to Wilhelm Frick, the Medes, Persians and Hittites belonged to the Indo-Germanic branch, as did the Sumerians.

Ancient Greek and Roman history was the focus of attention for theorists of the existence of Indo-Germanic Nordic peoples. In 1935, for example, Wilhelm Sieglin, an anthropologist at the University of Berlin, asserted, in a work widely reprinted by the SS, that the Indo-Germanic race had conquered the world. According to Sieglin, the Greek territories experienced at least two waves of migration and settlement by Indo-Germanic populations, waves confirmed by numerous archaeological traces. The first corresponds to the settlement of the Achaeans on Greek territory, around 1800 BC, and the second to the migration of Dorian populations around 1200 BC. Sieglin also drew up an inventory of the hair attributes of Greek and Roman gods and historical figures, which he used to support his conclusion that ancient Greeks and Romans were of Nordic origin. Günther, too, wishing to propose an inventory of ancient characters, mythological or otherwise, and their Indo-Germanic origins, equates Penelope with the Valkyries, thus integrating the figure of the wife of the king of Ithaca, Ulysses, into Nordic mythology, and thus into the Nordic Indo-Germanic peoples.

=== An unequal society ===
Nazi researchers, directly inspired by Gustaf Kossinna's vision, assumed that the Indo-Germanic Nordic society was profoundly unequal, as would seem to be confirmed by the discovery of "royal tombs" in central Germany. According to the Ahnenerbe researchers, this specific social organization may even have been the key to the presence of northern Indo-Germanic populations in all the territories they studied. According to these researchers, the social organization of Nordic populations, although clearly delineated, was not based on written law, as the norm came from the Volk.

Thus, at the pinnacle of this caste-based society, these Bronze Age princes, or "Führer", would have ruled over vast farming communities. According to Heinrich Himmler, some of these princes were called upon by non-Indo-Germanic Nordic populations to become their leaders, and ended up drowning in what Himmler calls "this cauldron of peoples made up of millions of sub-humans". According to Himmler, the descendants of these princes included the great Asian leaders Attila, Genghis Khan, Tamerlane, Lenin and Stalin. The latter, descended from "racial mongrels", represented, according to the SS Reichsführer, a very great threat to the German people, the only one who could victoriously oppose the objectives of the Germanic Volk: in 1942, Himmler even conducted a racial examination of Genghis Khan, stating that he was tall and red-haired, two physical characteristics supposed to attest to his Germanic ancestry. In the eyes of the SS Reichsführer, they were the only leaders capable of leading the Indo-Germans to their doom, as they possessed Nordic racial characteristics. They possessed fragments of Indo-Germanic Nordic blood, which Himmler claimed were the only ones capable of organizing states, commanding peoples and "defeating" the Reich. For Himmler, these figures and their achievements were proof of the existence of a Nordic Indo-Germanic ruling caste among Slavic and Asian peoples.

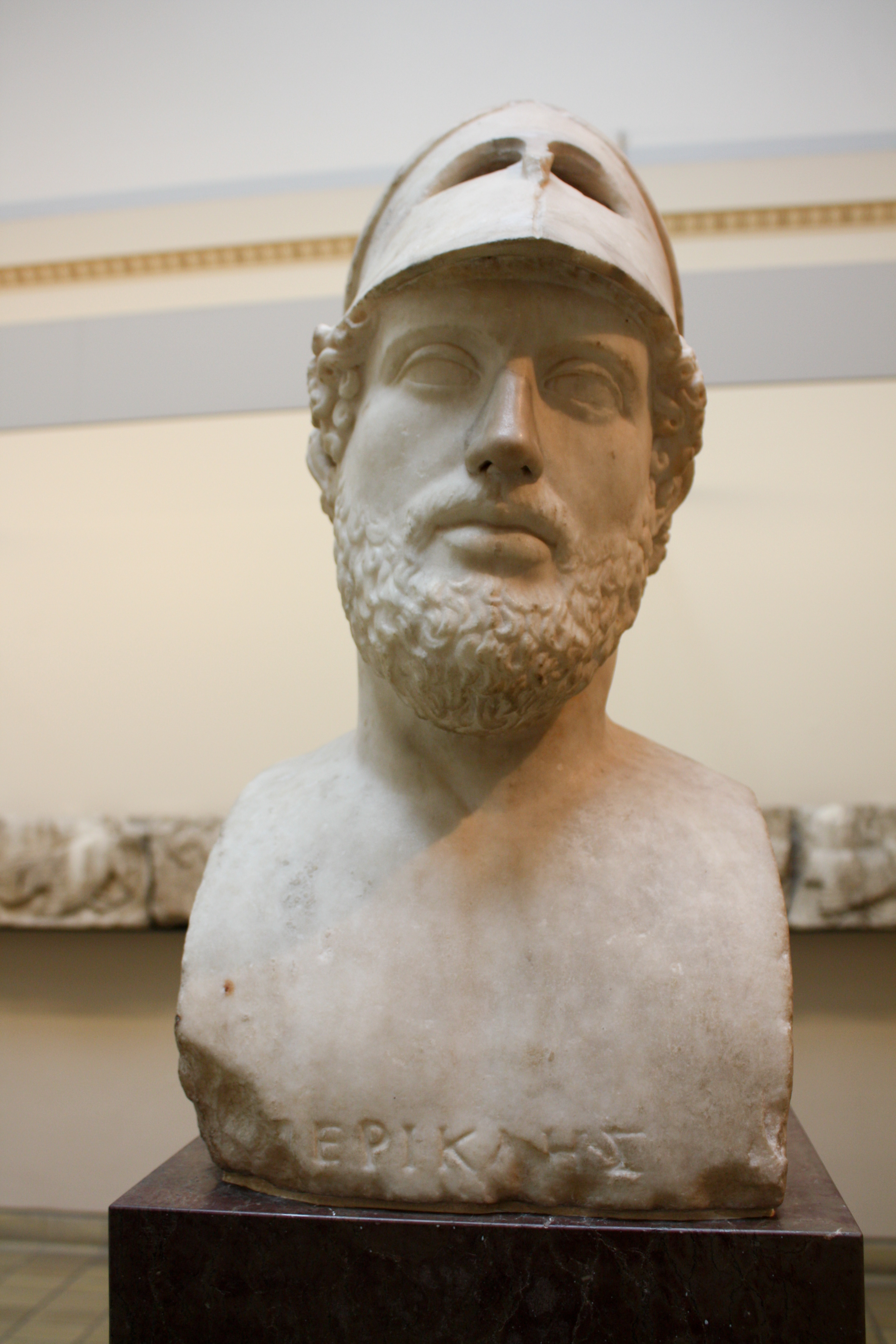
The Athenian Pericles is a Nordic model, according to theorist Fritz Schachermeyr.

Such leaders, who were sent to inferior populations, would in fact the "Führer", of the Nordic populations: according to Fritz Schachermeyr, the Nordic leaders were a "exceptional individuals", inspired idealists, artists. Pericles, like other ancient politicians, is one of the models of the Nordic leader, who sought to integrate the entire ethnic community into the political body of the city: this integration into the political body was achieved by means of democratic political institutions, reread in the light of this holistic political philosophy. Pericles is thus a model, an example for NSDAP ideologists to follow: along with Phidias, he appears to Helmut Berve as a model for the relationship between the Nordic Führer and the artist, a model that Hitler is attempting to reproduce with Albert Speer.

According to Darré, who draws on the works of Hans Günther, the Indo-Germanic society was also patriarchal and patrimonial, as evidenced by the place of the household at the heart of the home and the dominance of the pater familias. For Darré, these elements of social organization are further proof of the kinship between Greek, Roman and Germanic populations, all of which were organized in patriarchal societies.

The supposedly patriarchal organization of the Indo-Germans was not the only focus of Nazi researchers tracking down hypothetically Indo-Germanic cultural manifestations in European culture. In an effort to link the Nazi policy of conquering living space with this population, particular attention was paid to religious practices.

=== A unique religion ===
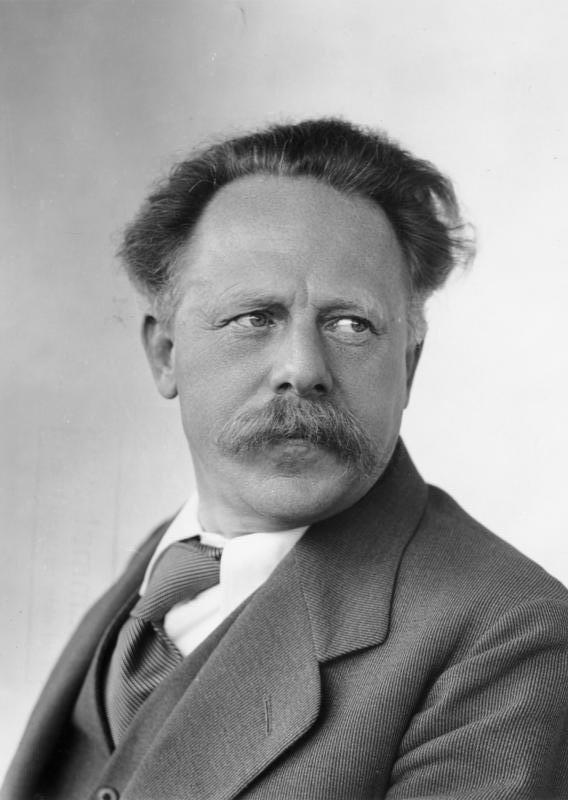
Jakob Wilhelm Hauer describes the religion of the Indo-Germanic people as contemplative.

Indeed, the Indo-Germanic Nordic people are said to have developed specific forms of religiosity, exalting not only the ruler, but also nature as part of pantheistic beliefs in the eternity of the soul. According to the intellectual promoters of the Nordic vision, Günther, Claus and Hauer, religions are an expression of race and racial biology.

In religious terms, according to Jakob Wilhelm Hauer and the German Faith Movement, a faith movement that grew rapidly in the early years of the Third Reich, the Indo-Germans practiced a contemplative, pantheistic religion, advocating reincarnation and a close relationship with nature. According to Hauer, the Indo-Germans were the promoters of a religion that saw life and nature as emanations of divinity. In this tradition, Hans Günther defines the German as an individual in harmony with nature, whom he does not seek to disturb.

Hans Günther believed he could uncover the original Nordic religion through a comparative study of texts from Greek and Roman religions, as well as the Bhagavad-Gita. Others, notably Hermann Wirth, were interested in the representations left on the stones of burial mounds in France, such as those at Glozel and Gravinis, or the megaliths of Brittany, and tried to deduce the nature of the religion of the original Indo-Germanic-Nordic peoples. In the 1930s, Hermann Wirth, a German researcher who was also involved in Westforschung, a multi-disciplinary approach aimed at scientifically justifying German claims to increasingly extensive French territories, took an interest in the representations of the Gravinis cairn and the Glozel burial mound. As a result of this research, Wirth developed his version of the religiosity of northern Indo-Germanic populations. According to Wirth, the original Indo-Germanic cults were organized around a solar cosmology and the symbolic interpretation of the Sun's various positions throughout the year. As early as 1934, Hans Günther also set out his vision of the Nordic religiosity; for him, the proximity between gods and men is the main characteristic of Nordic religion, within the framework of a tolerant, non-proselytizing religion. According to Zschaetzsch and List, the original religion of the original Nordic population was transmitted by a chain of secret initiates, including Christ, the Knights Templar and the Rosicrucians.

Himmler, developed the idea that Indo-Germans believed in the unity of living beings and respected life in all its forms. As part of this search for the original religiosity of the Indo-Germans, Himmler made no secret of his fascination with Tibetan monks, supposed descendants of Indo-Germanic populations who had emigrated to Asia in prehistoric times, and commissioned studies into the relationship between man and animal in India and Tibet, in order to shed light on the kinship between Tibetans and Germans.

But the supposed primitive religiosity of the original Nordic population, invented from scratch by Hauer and Günther, was not the only focus of German research. The proponents of the Indo-Germanic population's existence placed great emphasis on the analysis of Greek and Roman religions, and attempted to establish not only correspondences between Indo-Germanic religiosity and Greco-Roman religiosity, but also parallels with the supposed history of the Indo-Germanic Nordic populations.

Thus, the Greco-Roman religion is presented, by the promoters of the Nordicist hypothesis, in such a way as to make it compatible with the religiosity of the Indo-Germanic Nordic population. In 1927, philosopher and art historian Karl Kynast compared two gods of Greek mythology: the first, Apollo, was presented as a Nordic god of light, intelligence and mastery, while the second, Dionysus, was an Asian god of night and trance. But this contrast between Apollo and Dionysus also manifests itself in the way the god is invoked.

Of particular interest to Nazi researchers was the ritual practices of the Indogermans, that of the ver sacrum, a Roman rite of Sabine origin. Richard Walther Darré, one of the promoters of Generalplan Ost, in his book The Peasantry as the Source of Life for the Nordic Race, presents this ritual as a means of recruiting settlers to found another city, who had been vowed, in grave circumstances, to the god Mars. In the supposedly agrarian context in which these populations evolved, the practice of ver sacrum was intended to use surplus population to conquer and colonize neighboring territories. According to Darré, the Roman rite of ver sacrum would have taken place in spring, from March to May, the ideal period for emigration to the original cradle of Indo-Germanic populations, southern Sweden, the other months of the year being those of winter dormancy or summer agricultural activity. According to Darré, this temporal cooincidence between the Roman ver sacrum and the period of migration to southern Sweden demonstrates the Nordic and Indo-Germanic origins of the Italic populations who founded Rome. In his view, the period during which this Roman rite takes place corresponds to a legacy from the Nordic archaic period. In this way, the rite commemorates the original migrations of Indo-Germans to Latium, following a spring migration.

=== Only one enemy, in the East ===
The opposition between an Indo-Germanic, dolichocephalic Apollo and an Asian, brachycephalic Dionysus forms the mythological part of the racial conflict that has allegedly pitted Indo-Germanic, Nordic peoples against Asian, Oriental populations since time immemorial. The history of Europe is thus revisited through the distorting prism of a racial history: following Hitler's assertions, a 1942 training brochure for the National Socialist German Workers' Party asserts that the Indo-Germans were pursued by "6,000 years of Jewish hatred".

==== Social Darwinism at population level ====
For Adolf Hitler, the clash between the Indo-Germans and the Jews, two different races, was the main law of history. In Hitler's view, the human races fight each other to ensure their preservation and reproduction in a finite world, within a Malthusian conception of the world. In the Nazi worldview, the two opposing races would be the Aryan, Indo-Germanic, Nordic race and the Jewish, Semitic, Oriental race.

In this battle of the races, racial mixing between populations from different races would be the most insidious weapon. According to Nazi doctrine, the Greeks, like the Romans, would have failed as champions of the Nordic cause in the race war between Indo-Germans and Semites by allowing the two races to mix. Hitler, but also Nazi intellectuals, explicitly linked racial purity and political power: according to Hitler (or so he asserted in his private remarks of November 12, 1941), the Orientals could only have successfully conquered Europe because they had to fight racially weakened states.

This opposition between Indo-Germans and Orientals stems from two different lifestyles, two different Weltanschaungen (worldviews). The adversary of the sedentary Indo-Germanic peasant is first and foremost a nomad. According to Richard Darré, nomadism is part and parcel of Asian culture: Semites are incapable of cultivating the land. Semites or Asians, according to Darré, lead a nomadic existence, plundering the resources of the territories on which they have successively settled and raiding neighboring territories.

==== A centuries-old conflict ====
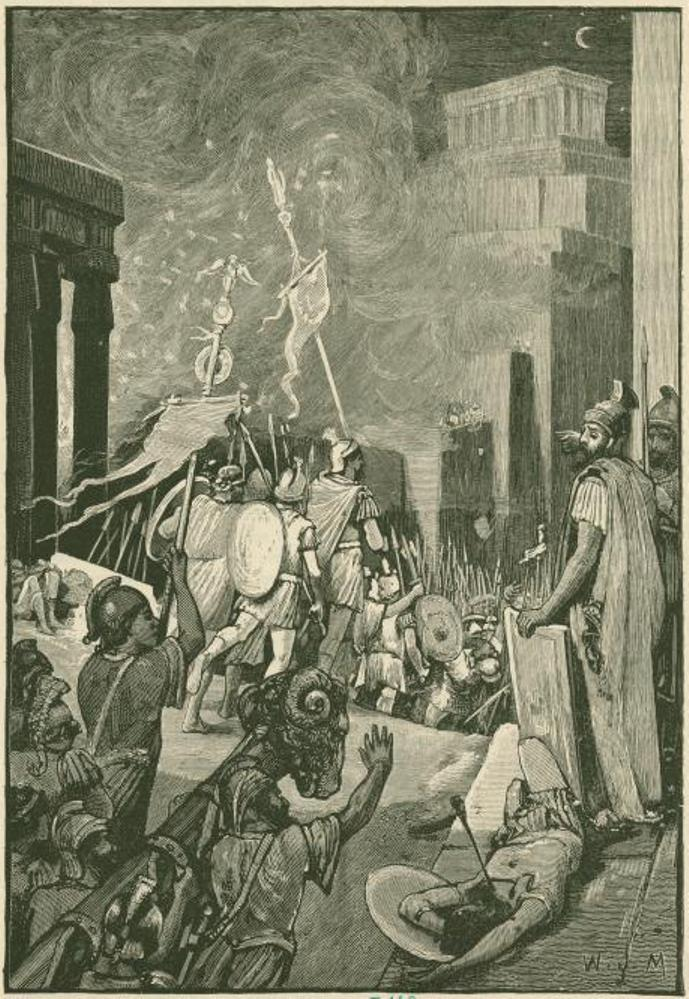
According to Alfred Rosenberg, the capture of Carthage by the Romans was a partial victory of the Indo-Germans over the Asians.

This protean adversary, identified over the centuries with the Persians, the Ionians, the Athenians, the Carthaginians, the Huns, the Arabs (defeated in 732), the Hungarians, the Mongols and the Judeo-Bolsheviks - the latest avatar, but, according to Hitler, the most dangerous of them all - is said to have suffered some resounding defeats at the hands of the European and Indo-German populations. Some examples are the capture of Carthage and the attack on the Soviet Union in 1941.

According to Nazi theorists, that protean, Oriental adversary was the Indo-Germans' essential enemy, embodied by the figure of the Jew, as vicious and evil as the Nordic is good. The latter would be primarily responsible for the racial defeats suffered by the Indo-Germanic conquerors over the centuries. According to Rosenberg, these same two adversaries have been battling it out since the dawn of times. As early as the first centuries of archaic Rome, Eastern populations organized in matriarchal societies, notably the Etruscans, threatening Rome: in fact, the Etruscans were Asians, vectors of vice and corruption, who wished to impose a matriarchal organization on the Romans, who were Nordic. The Greeks, a branch of the Indo-Germanic Nordic race, suffered a severe racial defeat at the hands of the Asians during the Hellenistic period. (Note: According to Fritz Schachermeyr, Alexander the Great was an Indo-Germanic conqueror whose project for a universal monarchy led to a racial weakening of the Greek population) Following this racial defeat, the Roman Republic, the new champion of the northern Indo-Germanic cause, had its moment of glory: the first (chronologically) Asian enemy that the Republic encountered in its expansion, according to Fritz Schachermeyr, was the Carthaginian thalassocracy, with its strong Semitic character. Accordingly, Alfred Rosenberg proposed a racial vision of Cato the Elder's speech, calling on the Senate to destroy Carthage, declaring that it was not a city-state that had to be destroyed, but a branch of the Semitic race. Similarly, according to Joseph Vogt, coordinator of a collective work published in 1943, the Punic Wars became a racial confrontation between Rome, an Indo-Germanic city, and Carthage, a Phoenician and therefore Semitic city: the conflicts between Rome and Carthage appeared to him as wars of racial extermination. Just as Cato called for the racial destruction of Carthage, Lucius Iunius Brutus, by establishing the Republic in late 500s BC, would have put an end to the Etruscan presence in Rome, the cause of the physical and moral depravity of the Roman population. The school textbooks published in the Reich in 1938 emphasized this racial vision of Roman history, and offered a racist and anti-Semitic reading of the Eastern conflicts in which Rome was involved from the beginning of the first century BC.

However, this confrontation did not result in a total victory for the Nordic race over its Semitic competitors: in 1945, Joseph Goebbels regretted that the advantage gained by Rome in the Third Punic War had not been pushed to its conclusion, as the wars of Vespasian and Titus had come, in his view, too late. Goebbels' later arguments echoed his earlier conclusions: all Nazi scholars and politicians agreed that the wars waged by Vespasian and Titus marked a turning point in the Indo-Germans' struggle against the Semites. Following the destruction of the Temple in Jerusalem, the Jews became aware of their inability to openly confront armies made up of soldiers of northern Indo-Germanic origin, and from that point on, they preferred deceit and plotting to direct confrontation. However, the use of disloyal tactics by Asian populations does not date back to the reign of Vespasian, but is thought to have been widespread among Phoenician populations since antiquity. Hans Oppermann defines the Jewish race as a conglomerate of populations originating from Asia Minor and Phoenicia, and defines the relationship between the Jews and Rome - city, empire, state-building and champion of the Indo-Germans - as one of "abysmal" hatred. The historian Ferdinand Fried similarly offers a racial and anti-Semitic reading of the Book of Esther, describing the Persian massacres as "Aryan pogroms", and declaring that Asian peoples refused to submit to the established order.

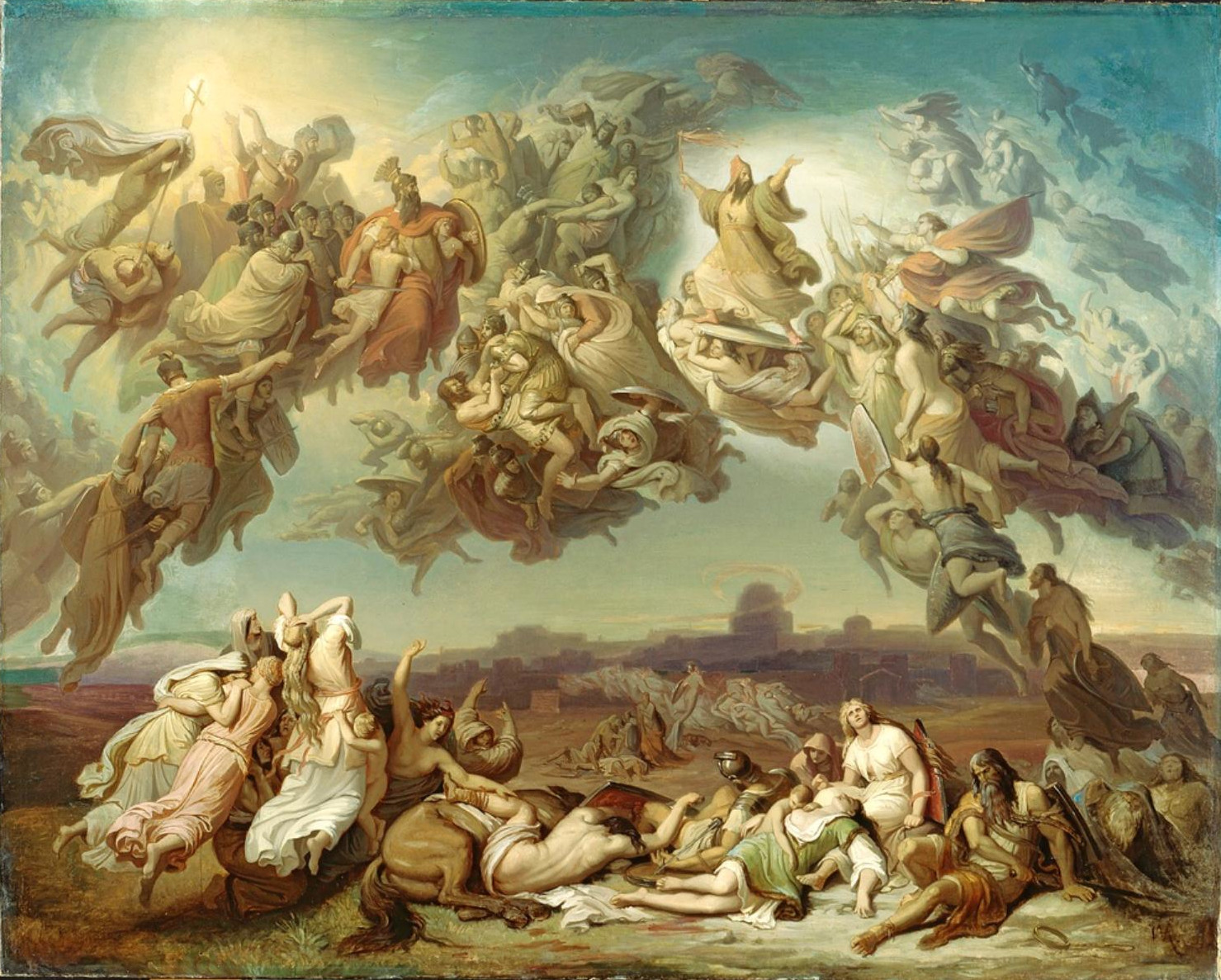
Die Hunnenschlacht ("The Battle of the Huns"), a painting by Wilhelm von Kaulbach, presents the battle of the Catalaunic Fields as a gigantomachy.

From 1941 onwards, this racial interpretation became more widespread. In a speech to the Reichstag, Hitler himself defined the Eastern Front War as the culmination of this centuries-old conflict, presenting the units engaged against the Red Army as the successors of the Romans and the allied Germans against the Huns; during the course of the conflict, he multiplied the assimilations between the Soviet units increasingly engaged on German soil and Hannibal's army conducting operations on the territory of the Republic. Himmler, for his part, developed the theme of the Asian enemy of the Indo-Germanic race, an enemy reinforced by the use of an ideology, Bolshevism, in total opposition to the foundations of Germanness, according to Himmler. During the war, the SS publishing house produced a number of booklets on this theme. One entitled Der Untermensch (The Subhuman) featured an illustration inspired by the Apocalypse: three horsemen, a graphic synthesis of depictions of the cruel and ugly Huns, Tatars and Hungarians, charging women and children. In 1943, another booklet, entitled Das Reich und Europa (The Reich and Europe), stressed the continuity of the conflict between the Indo-Germanic race and Asian populations. Himmler not only authorized the publication of these works, but also disseminated their theses in speeches to SS units: on July 13, 1941, and again on November 22, 1942, the SS Reichsführer established a kinship between the Soviets and the Huns defeated in 451.

In the eyes of Nazi theorists, there should be no doubt as to the outcome of this age-old conflict: in this racial struggle, the champions of the Indo-Germanic populations defend civilization and the potential for cultural expansion, while the Asian populations can only bring decline and destruction.

==== From Christianity to Bolshevism, an uninterrupted line of descent ====
In this centuries-old struggle, Asian populations would have used Christianity - "pre-Bolshevism", "metaphysical Bolshevism" according to Hitler - to undermine the foundations of Nordic society. In order to emphasize this alleged filiation, Hitler and those close to him, insisting on the Jewish origins of Paul and Marx, developed the idea that Bolshevism, like Christianity, was intended to be internationalist and egalitarian.

In this respect, Hitler was close to Günther and the Nordicists. According to Günther (but he was not the only one), Christianity denied the foundations of Nordic religiosity. Christianity is, in the eyes of Nordicists, the antithesis of the Nordic religion they call for: for Günther, in his work on Nordic piety, the Indogerman-Nordic is the god's equal when he prays upright, gazing upwards, whereas the Christian, like the Jew, prays, terrified, to his god on his knees, gazing downwards. As the worshipper is the equal of the god he worships, he has no need of an intermediary between him and his god either; the ecclesiastical hierarchy is, in Günther's eyes, further proof of the oriental, "desert" character of Christianity.

Similarly, on October 21, 1941, Hitler drew a parallel between Paul and Marx, calling them Saul and Mardechai respectively, after Marx's father. In Hitler's eyes, Paul was a precursor of Bolshevism: in his eyes, Paul's message led to the mobilization of the plebs against their northern rulers.

=== Divergences within Nazism ===
While the Nazis share a common conception of the enemy of the Indo-Germanic people, they are divided within the NSDAP as to what this people and its history represent within Nazi doctrine.

==== Hans Günther, the Nordic theory master thinker ====
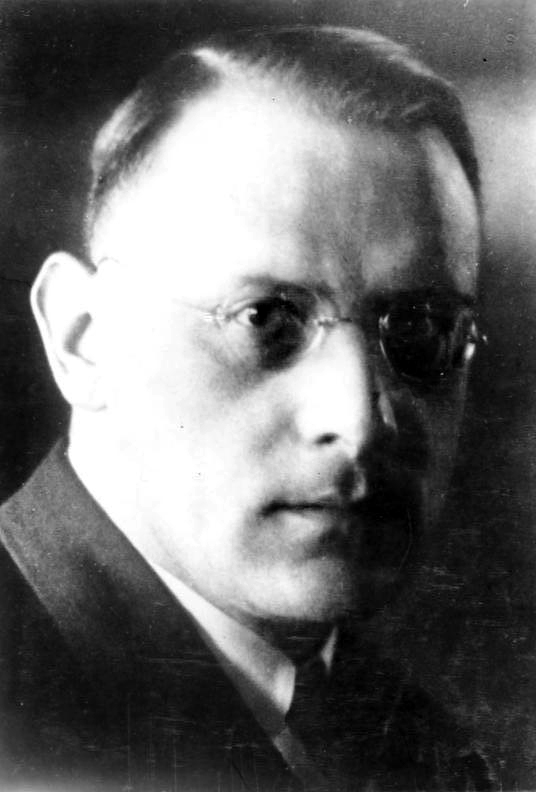
Hans Günther, nicknamed by the SS Hans Rassengünther ("Race Günther"), promoter of the Nordicist hypothesis of the origins of the Indogermans.

In the 1920s, for example, Hans Günther challenged the thesis of the Oriental origins of the Germans, ensuring the success of his ideas thanks to the support of part of the NSDAP and his widely distributed didactic publications.

Supported by the promoters of medical raciology and the Ahnenerbe, he asserted that Indo-Germanic populations did not originate in the East, but in northern Europe. In his view, the idea of a migration of northern Indo-Germanic elites during the 4th and 3rd millennia B.C. was invalid, as there was no material to support this theory, the validity of which he challenged as early as 1929. For him, and especially for Hitler, all civilization originated in northern Europe. Thanks to his prestige among Nazi leaders, his numerous publications and the relentlessness with which he expounded his ideas, he quickly established his thesis of the Nordic origin of all conquering peoples. Günther and those he influenced, who were all virulent anti-Christian propagandists, refuted the idea of a Mediterranean and Asian origin of civilization, mainly because of its Old Testament origins.

==== Nordicism and the SA ====
The theories put forward by Hans Günther divided the Nazi party between supporters and opponents of this new Nordicist racial theory, which was beginning to have a strong influence on the party. While a pole of support for Günther's ideas crystallized in the NSDAP, organized around Himmler, Rosenberg and Darré, these elitist positions were opposed by the SA, close to the positions of Friedrich Merkenschlager.

Merkenschlager, a member of the NSDAP and SA since 1920 and promoter of the "dynamic race" concept, quickly emerged as the main opponent of Hans Günther's Nordicist theories, hence his nickname of "anti-Günther". The latter defended the idea that Indo-Germans were not originally a population of peasants in search of land to cultivate, but migrant hunters in search of increasingly extensive hunting grounds. He asserts himself as a defender and supporter of the idea of racial mixing, from which the German people would have descended. More fundamentally, Merkenschlager was opposed to the colonial projects brought about by the NSDAP's adoption of Günther's Nordicist Indo-Germanic theory, and to what Günther called "the denordification of Germans", a consequence, in his view, of mixing races. Indeed, Merkenschlager started from the reverse premise: the quest for racial purity was mortifying for the German people, and only a policy of judiciously organized miscegenation could protect German blood within a renewed population. These views earned him the enmity of Darré, who had him dismissed from the Reich Institute of Biology in September 1933. Following Merkenschlager's lead, Karl Saller, an anthropologist and physician, doubted the validity of the Nordic race theory, and proposed that the party adopt the concept of the people-race; in support of his theses, he published a pamphlet, Biology of the Body of the German People.

The Night of the Long Knives temporarily put an end to the debate in favor of the SS, the ideological domain and active supporter of Günther, whose theses were taken up and popularized in the newspaper Das Schwarze Korps. However, in January 1935, Merkenschlager, not one to concede defeat, published a provocative work reviving memories of the Wends and Slav populations in Prussia, which was quickly banned, first in Prussia, then throughout the Reich.

==== Debates on territorial borders ====
Debates between anthropologists and Nazi theorists were not limited to the scholastic question of origins. The ancient presence of Indo-Germanic populations in certain territories was also the subject of acrimonious exchanges between these researchers. For example, the question of whether Burgundy, a region of northern Indo-Germanic settlements, belonged to this region was at the heart of disputes between Nazi racialogists. For some, Burgundy was an area of colonization, while for others, it had been populated by Germanic peoples since the earliest times. According to the Pangermanists, the territory of the County of Burgundy should be returned to the Reich. The question was settled in early 1943, but the policy of including the territories of the former Duchy of Burgundy as a whole in the Reich was destined to be implemented at the end of the war.

While the origins of the Indo-Germans and the territorial extension of their settlement were hotly debated, the notion was never called into question in terms of either its existence or its geographical scope. The protagonists of this debate all saw the future of the German people in the realization of the National Socialist Reich, and each tried to impose within the NSDAP the doctrine most likely to facilitate the building of the new Reich.

== Research on the Indogermans ==
Nazi officials seek to have German researchers validate this Nazi myth of the origins of the German people. In fact, the ideologues defined the conclusions that were then to be validated by the results of research. As a result, the postulates of Nazism are validated by scientific research that only looks in the direction defined by the political authorities. In 1939, for example, they guided the Tibetan investigations of Ernst Schäfer and Bruno Beger, members of the RuSHA, who were looking for possible "Aryan racial vestiges" among the Tibetan people.

=== German prehistorians before 1933 ===
According to the archaeologists and scholars who developed the idea of an original Indo-Germanic population in the early 19th century, it was above all through research into the original language spoken by Indo-Germans that it would be possible to trace the history of Indo-Germanic populations. This research enabled the concept's promoters to develop the idea of the anteriority of Germanic populations in relation to the civilizations of the Mediterranean world. Thus, linguists and promoters of the Indo-Germanic ancestor accept the basic hypothesis of an original language as the basis for the idea of the existence of an Indo-European people, the original conquerors; this original people could have assumed the civilizing mission of extending its domination over the Eurasian continent. The establishment of this domination would only have been possible because of a certain technological advance and because the Indogermans, an "active race", would have conquered an empire at the expense of "passive races", according to Gutav Klemm, author of a Cultural History of Humanity.

In the 1920s, epigraphist and archaeologist Gustaf Kossinna, working on archaeological remains in southern Sweden, proposed a racial interpretation of these findings. The Indogermans would have originated in Germany and spread across the European continent, further and further from their original home, to Greece and Rome, for example. This distance would have facilitated the mixing and racial weakening of northern Indo-Germanic populations, in a process of denordification. At the beginning of the 20th century, he pioneered a new archaeological approach - settlement archaeology - and set out to determine the original cradle of the Indo-Germanic Nordic populations. Based on the idea that it is possible to locate the most ancient populations by studying the traces left by their successors, Kossinna developed the idea that archaeological materials would constitute the most relevant traces of the extension of original human, i.e. racial, groups.

The thesis of the Atlantean origins of the Indo-Germans also aroused the interest of German intellectuals in search of Indo-Germanic populations. In 1922, Aryanist Karl Georg Zschaetzsch defended the idea of Atlantis as the original cradle of Indo-Germanic populations. But Zschaetzch was not the only one to refer to a mythical continent that had disappeared: Herman Wirth asserted that the origins of the Nordic race could be traced to a continent that has now disappeared, in the middle of the Atlantic Ocean, the starting point for colonial expansion both to the East, in Europe, and to the West, in America; Wirth postulated that writing was an invention of the Nordic race, and that its presence attested to the Nordic character of a civilization that had gone back in time. A few years later, in 1934, the geographer Albert Hermann, close to Himmler, defended in a book the thesis of the existence of an Indo-Germanic Atlantic empire stretching from Scandinavia to North Africa.

All these speculations attracted the attention of Rosenberg and, above all, Himmler, who was fond of esotericism and mythology, and ordered research off the coast of Heligoland, but did not arouse the attention of the scientific community. Despite Himmler's and Rosenberg's interest, these Atlantean theories were greeted with indifference or skepticism by the scientific community.

=== The Nazi researchers ===
On Heinrich Himmler's orders, the Ahnenerbe, the SS research center, led excavation campaigns focusing on the archaeological remains left behind by the Indogermans.

From the earliest days of writing Mein Kampf, Hitler, and the Nazi thinkers who followed him, were not concerned with separating the truth from the falsehood in their worldview: so, once in power, they had the means to impose a vision of history in line with their ideas. So they put forward a phantasmagorical, contradictory vision of history, heavily influenced by mythology.

To give academic weight to Himmler's and the SS's scientific theories on the origins of German populations, the Ahnenerbe, a multidisciplinary research institute sponsored and financed by the NSDAP, was created in 1935 and definitively integrated into the SS in 1939. Originally dedicated to the search for proof of the superiority of the Aryan race, the Ahnenerbe proposed, at Himmler's request, interpretations in line with the Nordicist vulgate of material unearthed during excavation campaigns.

Numerous historical studies were carried out on hypothetical Indo-Germanic Nordic populations. The teams led by Wirth, the archaeologist in charge of the excavations, were particularly interested in the culture of corded ceramics. In fact, this civilization of peasants left vestiges, essentially clay pottery decorated with cord markings, on a continuous territory stretching from European Russia to Switzerland, including the Scandinavian countries.

For Hans Günther, however, the territorial expansion of Indo-Germanic populations is attested above all by cephalic studies of human remains discovered by the institute: he deduced from Greek helmets and representations of mythological figures that the Indo-Germans would have been blond dolichocephalic. In 1935, the anthropologist Wilhelm Sieglin, professor at the University of Berlin, published Blond Hair in Antiquity: A Survey of Ancient Evidence as a Contribution to the Indo-Germanic Question, in which he listed nearly 700 gods and mythological figures from the ancient peoples of the Old World, classifying them as blond or brunette. The conclusions are predictable: blond hair attests to an Indo-Germanic population, while brown hair attests to belonging to another race. The SS, and later Hitler himself, took up this thesis of blond hair color. The Schwarze Korps, an SS journal, complemented Günther's theses, asserting that, having lost the blondness of their hair as a result of intermarriage with brown-haired populations, the Romans were forced either to bleach their hair with saffron, or to wear blond wigs made from the hair of Germanic slaves.

In the 1930s, Himmler was fascinated by the Buddhist monks, who he saw as descendants of the northern conquerors of the Tibetan plateau, and sent an expedition to Tibet. Composed of raciologists, the expedition's mission was to carry out a systematic study of the local populations in order to demonstrate their Nordic character.

=== The genealogical hypotheses ===
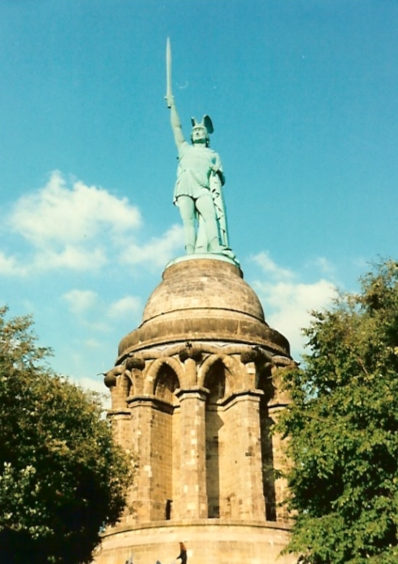
The memories of Arminius were used by the Nazis to justify research in occupied France.

German archaeologists were quick to establish correspondences between the signs left by different populations settled in a vast area of Central and Atlantic Europe. The proto-Celtic and Scandinavian civilizations of the early 2nd millennium B.C. left symbolic motifs on various media. The study of these motifs prompted Nazi archaeologists to assert the kinship between these two cultural groups, and to place both within the Indo-Germanic racial stock.

Similarly, based on the archaeological research of the previous period, which recognized the existence of the urnfield civilization, certain archaeologists, notably Georg Kraft and his pupil Wolfgang Kimmig, asserted that the ethnic manifestations of this culture were markers of the Indo-Germanic origin of these populations, which had mixed with proto-Celtic populations on the western bangs of their expansion area.

Some researchers were also interested in using other types of clues to go back in time in search of the original Indogermans. In 1929, Günther, in his Raciologie des peuples grec et romain (Raciology of the Greek and Roman peoples), attests to the kinship between the great ancient civilizations and the German peoples, linking the myth of Hercules to Scottish legends such as the mythical Hyperborean people, located by Diodorus Siculus and Herodotus north of the Carpathians, the term Hyperboreans meaning, for Hans Günther, "those who live beyond the mountains" or "those who live beyond the north wind".

Mythological accounts are not the only sources used in the quest for this original people. Indeed, raciologist Otto Reche uses linguistics to attest to the existence of the Indogermans: for him, the use of the word iris, to designate the contour of the pupil, would not be insignificant, since this word also means rainbow in the original Indo-Germanic language. For Reche, the use of the same word to designate two different things attests to the fact that dark irises were rare among Indo-Germanic populations. Darré notes that the Sanskrit word for "steppe" and the Greek word for "field" are identical, even though there are no steppes in India, demonstrating not only an unmistakable kinship between these different populations, but also that the Indian populations would have originated in a territory with large forests, such as southern Sweden, the supposed place of origin of the Nordic Indo-Germanic populations.

In the 1930s, in regions close to the Reich, the Germanic past was recreated and magnified by Ahnenerbe archaeologists allied with local autonomists. In Burgundy, for example, the work and excavations of German archaeologists were supported by the latter, including Jean-Jacques Thomasset. Thomasset, who was close to Burgundian autonomist circles, encouraged the development of a Burgundian autonomist sentiment that had been curbed by the French Revolution. Over the years, he moved closer to Pangermanism, proposing the annexation of Burgundy to the Reich and evoking the memory of Arminius. In the 1940s, Thomasset exalted the Burgundian people's allegiance to the Indo-Germanic race, supported by the archaeological research of the SS, who were interested in the Burgundian settlement and the archeology it had left, both in the landscape and in toponymy.

=== The swastika, according to Nazis an Indo-Germanic symbol ===
Among Nazi symbols, the swastika is the best-known, linking the Nazi movement more or less explicitly with its prestigious mythical ancestors, the Indo-Germanic peoples who are said to have conquered Europe and part of Asia on several occasions, as evidenced by the presence of swastikas throughout Europe and Asia, from the Atlantic to Japan.

Nazi theorists gave the swastika a historical dimension. From the 1920s onwards, the swastika, on objects and buildings, would demonstrate - first according to Rosenberg, then according to other Nazi ideologists who followed him - the ancient presence of Aryan, and therefore Indo-Germanic, populations in a given region. Rosenberg places its appearance around 3000 BC in Northern Europe, the original home of Indo-Germanic populations, and asserts that its spread throughout the Old World followed the territorial and colonial expansion of the Indo-Germans. Based on these assumptions, a historical monograph on the swastika published in 1934 defended the monopoly of its use by the German people. After making an exhaustive list of Greek archaeological sites on which swastikas have been found, Günther defended the idea of the symbol's anterior presence in Scandinavia, thus demonstrating the unmistakably Indo-Germanic character of Greek civilization. Hans Günther also fiercely defended this link of kinship in his Racial History of the Greek and Roman Peoples, published in 1929.

=== Justification of territorial claims ===
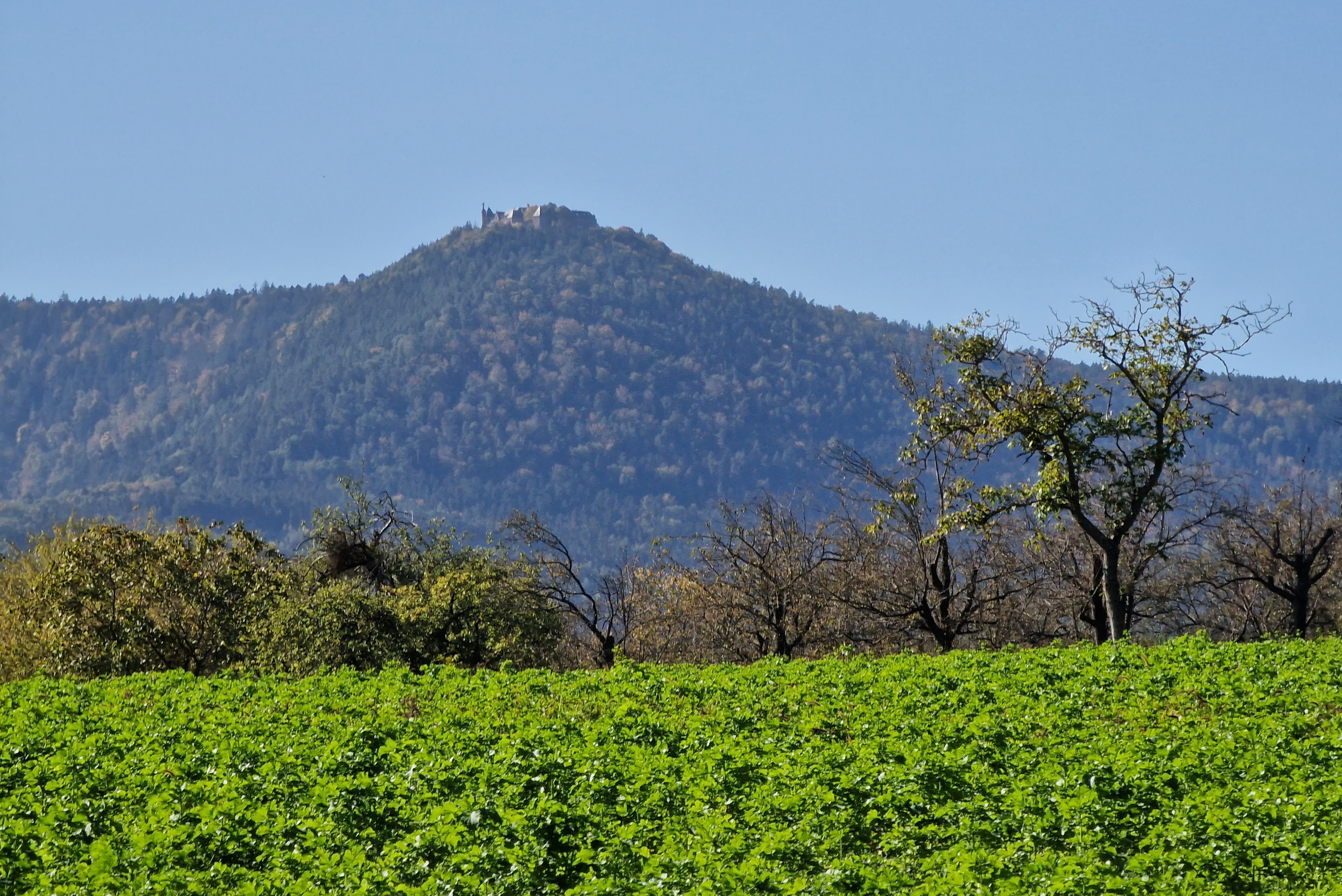
Research in the vicinity of Mont Sainte-Odile to justify the Reich's new western border

The Indo-Germanic theme is used extensively in German research to justify the Reich's territorial claims.

Within the framework of the Westforschung, multidisciplinary research on the Germanic West, research on Indo-Germanic populations was intended to provide scientific arguments to support the Reich's territorial claims on French regions. In the 1920s, this research focused on the territories lost in 1919, in an attempt to demonstrate the injustice of this territorial retreat, while in the following decade, under the leadership of research organizations financed or not by Nazi organizations, the aim was to prepare the return of racially Germanic populations to the Great German Reich. Sites were identified, initially close to the new Reich frontier, notably Mont Sainte-Odile.

For this purpose, contacts were established with French archaeologists for joint excavation campaigns, to obtain permission to study certain objects preserved in French museums and attest to their Germanic origin. For example, during a visit to France in 1937, a German archaeological mission examined the collections of the National Archaeological Museum of Saint-Germain-en-Laye.

In France, archaeological sites such as Glozel are used as evidence of the ancient presence of Indo-Germanic Nordic populations in the French territories. Among the materials used as objects of study in the prehistoric period, the Breton megaliths of the Gavrinis tumulus in Morbihan attracted the interest of German Ahnenerbe archaeologists. The latter, principally Herman Wirth, looked for swastikas and other Indo-Germanic motifs on excavated material and objects in the collections of French archaeological museums. Wirth associated them with primitive sun worship, as it would have developed in Scandinavia. In search of the original home of the Indo-Germanic peoples, his excavations at Gavrinis are intended to pave the way for other research campaigns in Scandinavia, which should bring to light the elements needed to write a history of the primordial European peoples.

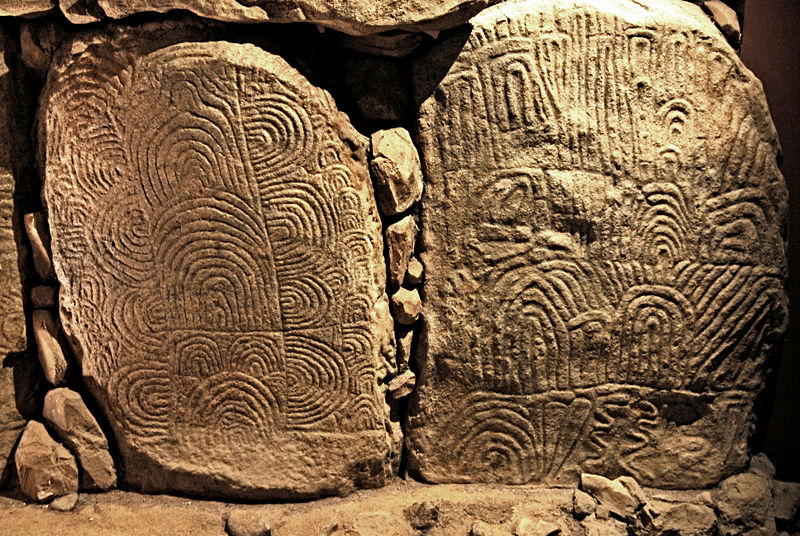
According to Hermann Wirth, the motifs depicted inside the Gavrinis tumulus are close to original Indo-Germanic representations.

In the 1930s, Nazi researchers not only carried out research in Brittany, but also organized research trips from the universities of the Palatinate, Baden and Württemberg to identify Germanic sites in Alsace and Moselle. German research, based on the methods of Kossina, creator of settlement archaeology, supported the Pangermanist claims to the west, building on the investigations into Germanic settlement west of the Rhine, notably those of Franz Steinbach in the 1920s and Franz Petri in the 1930s.

Indeed, German pangermanists, emboldened by the victory of 1940, were whetting their appetites. A comprehensive project of excavations and archaeological work, divided into programs, was planned in France, especially in northern and eastern France, and in Belgium. The project focused on research at prehistoric, protohistoric and ancient sites. For the prehistoric period, Julius Andree, from the University of Münster, was in charge of dating Lower Paleolithic material discovered in the Somme valley, with the aim of linking this material with others found near Himmler's beloved Externsteine. His rival for control of archaeology in the Reich, Alfred Rosenberg, ordered the examination of bone remains preserved in French and Belgian museums to establish the fossils' racial affiliation. The stakes were high, since the aim was to determine whether the first European populations were of "Indo-Germanic racial stock". Prehistory was not the only field of research; Protohistory and History were also called upon to attest to the presence of Indo-Germanic populations in the territories to be annexed.

For example, a fairly systematic archaeological research program developed by German researchers on French territory aimed to establish the kinship between French and German sites of the urnfield civilization. Another entailed the study of protohistoric defensive sites in a strip of land stretching from French Lorraine to Normandy, the identification of defensive buildings from the Late Frankish period as evidence of their Frankish origin, and the identification of archaeological traces of the presence of the Laeti, Germanic auxiliaries of the Roman legions.

Entire regions formerly populated by Indo-Germanic peoples were thus returned to the Reich. The victory of 1940 opened them up once again to German colonization: Hitler defined a border on June 18, 1940, the Verdun-Toul-Belfort line, and later, for ethnic reasons, fixed it to that of the kingdom of France at the time of Charles V. Others, like Franz Petri, were more ambitious, freeing themselves from the traditional methods of archaeology and using linguistics, philology and ancient texts. The latter's research led him to work on proven "Germanic" sites, enabling him to establish the racial frontier on the lower reaches of the Seine and the bend in the Loire, where the prehistoric and protohistoric waves of Indo-Germanic migration would have stopped.

== The Third Reich, successor of the Indogermans ==
=== The alleged Indo-Germanic peoples ===
The field of raciology, and more specifically one of its promoters, Hans Günther, quickly drew up an inventory of the Dolichocephalic peoples - who, according to Günther, were undoubtedly Indo-Germanic - and the territories they occupied.

==== Eurasian Germanity ====
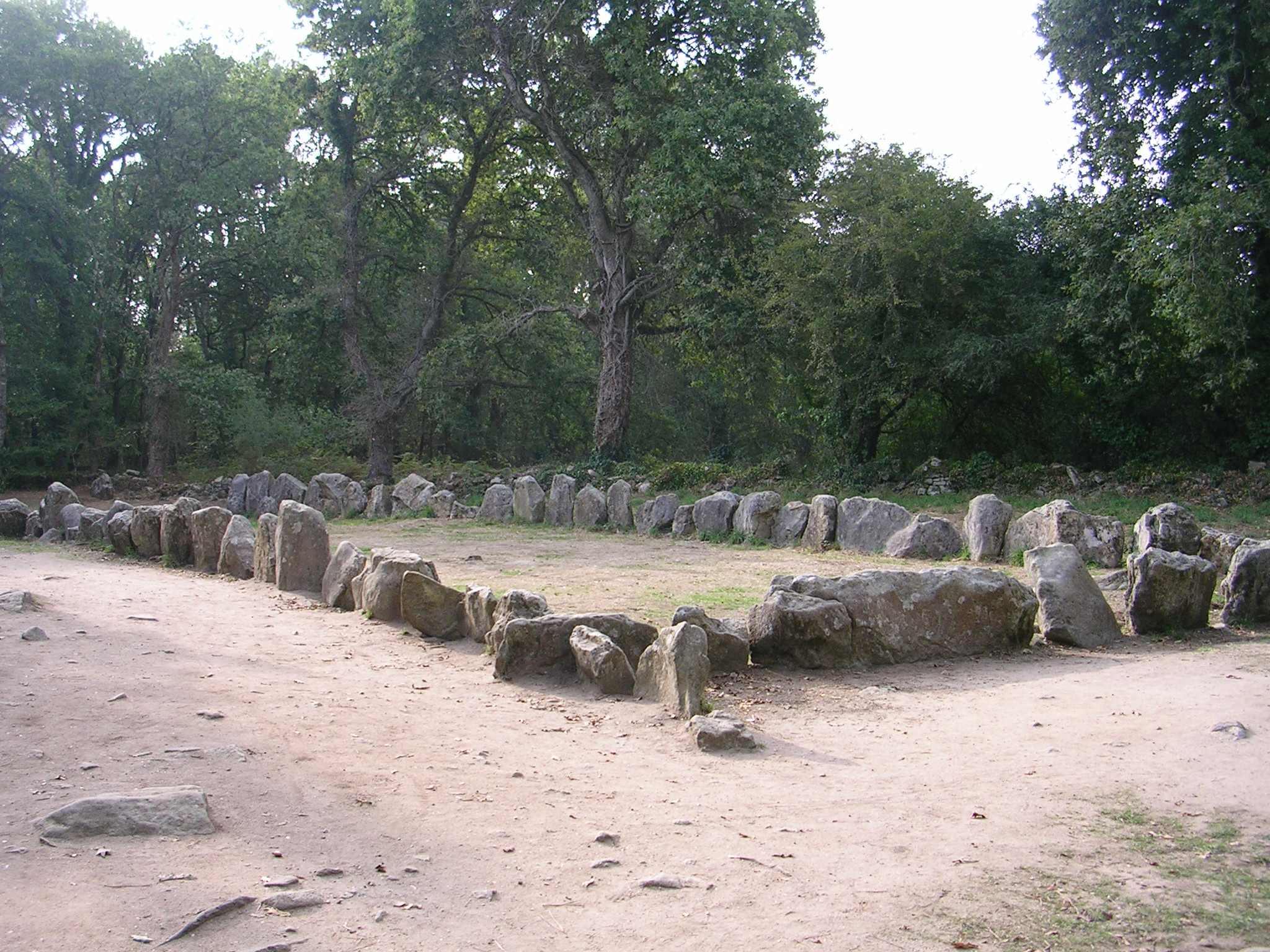
According to Nazi researchers, the Manio burial site in Carnac is close to the princely burial mounds of central Germany.

Drawing up a list of Indo-Germanic peoples enabled German raciologists to establish cousinships and links between European and Asian populations, to pursue a policy of tracking down lost Germanic genes throughout the territories controlled by the Reich, and also, in the tradition of Pangermanism, to provide historical justification for the Reich's expansionist policy. According to the theorists of Pangermanism, the territories on which Indo-Germanic populations have settled (or would have settled) must revert to the Reich. The Greeks, in particular, are said to be Indo-Germanic populations that have undergone varying degrees of mixing, as asserted by Nazi raciologists on a study trip to Greece in 1939. The people of Laconia were more capable of preserving their Indo-Germanic racial heritage than the people of Attica.

Himmler was not the last of the Nazi leaders to speculate on a Nordicity extending across the entire European continent. He asserted that Tibetans, and more specifically Buddhist monks, were a branch of Nordic stock who had migrated to the Tibetan plateau in prehistoric times; he also asserted that Nordic populations had conquered the Indian subcontinent and enslaved the populations there.

According to the proponents of the existence of an original Indo-Germanic people, all great human achievements, such as writing, are the fruit either of Indo-Germanic, dolichocephalic populations, or of populations that experienced a period of Indo-Germanic domination. Thus, all great human civilizations since Antiquity would have flourished thanks to the settlement of conquering Indo-Germanic populations, the only ones capable, according to Nazi raciologists, of conquering and maintaining empires, thus enabling the creation of lasting works. This idea allows us to create cousinships with populations as diverse as the ancient Egyptians, the ancient Romans and the Chinese. These populations are also linked to the Indo-Germanic peoples through an analysis of law: the Indo-Germans would have adopted a patriarchal law, like the Chinese since the time of Confucius. What's more, on the basis of archaeological material, many ancient peoples were assumed to belong to the Indo-Germanic branch, such as the Celts, the Balts, the Greeks, the Persians, and contemporary Germanic populations.

==== Towards a Greater German Reich ====
Starting in 1940, the French defeat provided an opportunity to establish the Indo-Germanic, Nordic origins of populations long established on French soil. The Bretons, and more broadly the Celts, were thus annexed to the family of Indo-Germanic peoples. For the Ahnenerbe researchers dispatched to the site, the human constructions in the Carnac region, and especially the burial sites, are similar to the numerous royal tumulus found in central Germany, and attest to the unequal social organization and racial kinship between the Bretons and the Indo-Germanic peoples. In addition, the similarity of the motifs depicted on the megaliths testifies to the kinship between Bretons and Scandinavians. Likewise, archaeologist Wolfgang Kimmig, author of a thesis on the subject, has documented discoveries in occupied France linked to the urn-field civilization, which was strongly represented in Baden. The proximity of the places where this civilization flourished and the places where the Celts appeared prompted German researchers to put forward the idea that the Proto-Celts, and hence their descendants, the Celts, were Indo-Germans descended from an ancient wave of Indo-Germanic settlement. Related to the Germans, they resembled them, as the descriptions given by ancient Greek and Roman authors attest.

Those furthest from the original cradle of the Nordic Indo-Germanic populations would have undergone a racial mixing, a denordification, which would have caused them to lose, with their white skin, their superiority, and their ability to erect and maintain extensive and long-lasting empires. In 1940, a corpus of texts entitled Death and Immortality implicitly proposed an inventory of supposedly Indo-Germanic peoples: from the Eddas to Alfred Rosenberg, via Homer, from Brahmanic texts to Nietzsche, via Cicero and Master Eckhart, these compiled texts embrace the Old World in its quasi-totality. Placed in this filiation, the Germans, regenerated by the racial policy put in place from 1933 onwards, representatives of the Indogermans, guided in their expansion by the swastika, appear not as mere invaders in Europe, but as the descendants of the populations that conquered, colonized and developed the European continent.

All these populations, supposedly racially related to the Germanic peoples, would naturally have to be integrated into the Reich, which would go from being Great Germany to being Great Germanic: According to Himmler, who promoted these ideas from 1938 onwards, the model to follow for the integration of these populations is to be found in the way the Reich was set up around Prussia, with the Great German Reich (integrating all German populations) playing a role close to that of Prussia in the process of unifying the Nordic (or Germanic) populations established on the European continent.

=== The founding myth of the Third Reich ===
Validating racist and anti-Semitic policies was not the only use of the Indo-Germans' founding myth of the Third Reich. Cultural policy is used to remind Germans of their racial kinship with the peoples of antiquity. The entire expansionist policy finds racial justification in the history of Indo-Germanic populations.

==== Justifying racism ====
For Nazi researchers, the Indo-Germans were a superior race who incorporated the indigenous populations they encountered in the course of their territorial expansion. This territorial expansion resulted in the establishment of a social structure characterized by a warrior aristocracy, breeding equines, waging war on horse-drawn chariots and wielding bronze implements. The Indogermans would therefore have used advanced technology.

This territorial expansion would have been the work of an active race, as asserted by Klemm. Indeed, in his Histoire culturelle de l'Humanité, Klemm accepts the principle of the existence of human races and their inequalities in relation to one another, inequalities he formulates in terms of "active" or "dynamic" races and "passive" races. The former, represented by the virile, bellicose Germanic race, would dominate the lazy, weak second, of which the Semitic race would be the archetype.

==== Special celebrations ====
Himmler, and the SS in his wake, wanted to instill in the German people a link between the Reich and Greco-Roman antiquity, and he extolled the kinship between Greco-Roman culture and German culture.

Thus, as early as 1933, the Parade of German Art, a propaganda event held in Munich on October 15, attached ancient representations, particularly Greek and Roman ones such as Athena and Hercules, to German art. In 1937, the inauguration of the House of German Art provided an opportunity to evoke "two thousand years of German culture" in a parade that annexed ancient Greco-Roman culture to German culture.

The exaltation of the Nordic kinship between Germans and ancient Greece reached its climax with the 1936 Summer Olympics. As early as 1935, Nazi propaganda issued instructions to transform the Games into a reminder of the shared ethnic history of the Greeks and Germans of the Reich: a newspaper, the Olympia Zeitung, was published to exalt the role of Ernst Curtius, and link his role to the rediscovery of the site of Olympia. At the same time, the newspaper advertised exhibitions in Berlin highlighting the kinship between ancient athletes, such as the discoboles wearing discs embossed with swastikas. Parallel to the Games, a taste for antiquity was developing in the Reich: temporary exhibitions of Indo-Germanic nudes, according to the ancient canons, were held in Berlin. But the most visible symbol of the exaltation of this kinship was the Olympic flame's journey from Olympia to Berlin, intended to materialize the racial kinship between ancient Greek and German athletes, both worthy representatives of the Indo-Germanic people.

The exaltation of the memory of the Indo-Germanic roots of the German people also manifested itself in the establishment, under the concurrent but complementary impetus of Joseph Goebbels and Rosenberg, of a calendar of celebrations linked to the supposed beliefs of the Indo-Germans. The latter wanted to set up a pagan festive calendar based, in his view, on primitive Indo-Germanic festivals, as an alternative to Christian festivals. In addition to National Socialist festivities such as Movement Day, Party Day and Führer Day (April 20), there were also festivities in a specifically Indo-Germanic tradition, such as solstitial festivals. Intended to replace the Christian festival of Christmas, the winter solstice became the "festival of the rising light", associated by Goebbels with the festival of Yule. Himmler also ensured that Christian festivals were restored to their original pagan character.

These public celebrations were accompanied by private ceremonies, encouraged by Rosenberg and those close to him, notably Jakob Hauer. Hauer, wishing to regenerate a paganism of Germanic essence, attempted to organize private celebrations - weddings, baptisms, births - according to an Indo-Germanic ritual: Based on Hauer's ideas, Rosenberg proposed rites designed to revive a secular Nordic tradition, the Lebensfeiern, as substitutes for Christian ceremonies; (Note: According to some radical Völkisch theorists, these rites are a misfortune for the German people.) Himmler thus intended to give rhythm to his men's lives, offering them supposedly Nordic utensils; at the same time, he frequently intervened in all these ceremonies. (Note: In particular, he demanded that SS soldiers who had died in battle be buried with their heads facing north.) However, these Nordic-inspired National Socialist rites, festivals and celebrations were not as successful as had been hoped beyond NSDAP circles.

==== Research in occupied countries ====
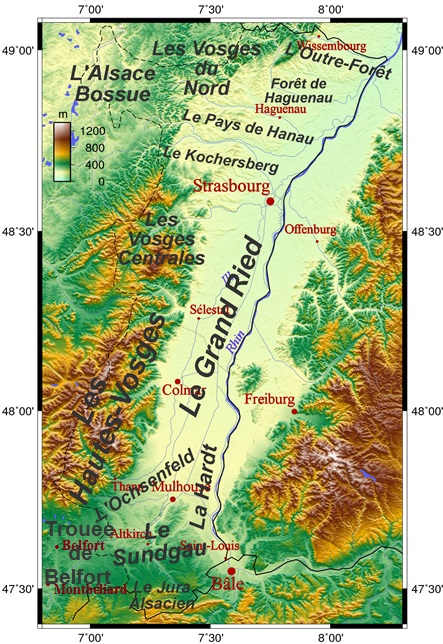
The Belfort Gap, south of Alsace, was a passageway for Germanic populations, according to proponents of the Indo-Germans.

In the wake of Germany's successes in Western Europe, German archaeological research used every means at its disposal to establish the future borders of the Greater German Reich, which was then expected to emerge victorious from the conflict.

What's more, the conclusions reached by Nazi researchers concerning the various populations that settled in both the western part of the Reich and eastern France defined a conception of French history that was not only completely at odds with the French narrative, but also in line with the Reich's territorial ambitions. In the eyes of the various Nazi researchers, France was in reality an artificial assembly of countries devoid of any national identity. From 1940 onwards, the systematic use of the traces supposedly left by the Indo-Germans was intended to justify the expansionism of the conquering Reich. According to the promoters of the idea, the variety of cultural influences in the Reich validated not only the hypothesis of the Indo-Germanic origin of the German people, but also the relevance of the concept of "Indo-Germany".

After the French defeat, Burgundian particularism was used to encourage France's domination. Recalling the late annexation of Franche-Comté to the Kingdom of France in 1678, and its Burgundian population, Nazi raciologists justified the annexation of Franche-Comté to the Reich and the granting of a high degree of autonomy to Burgundy. Strategic imperatives were also put forward for the realization of these projects: on December 30, 1942, the Völkischer Beobachter promised the Burgundy threshold a Germanic future. As a passageway for Germanic invasions, the Burgundy Gate was seen in this light as Germanic territory stolen by the Kingdom of France during a period of political weakness for the Reich.

==== Greece, an old Indo-Germanic land ====
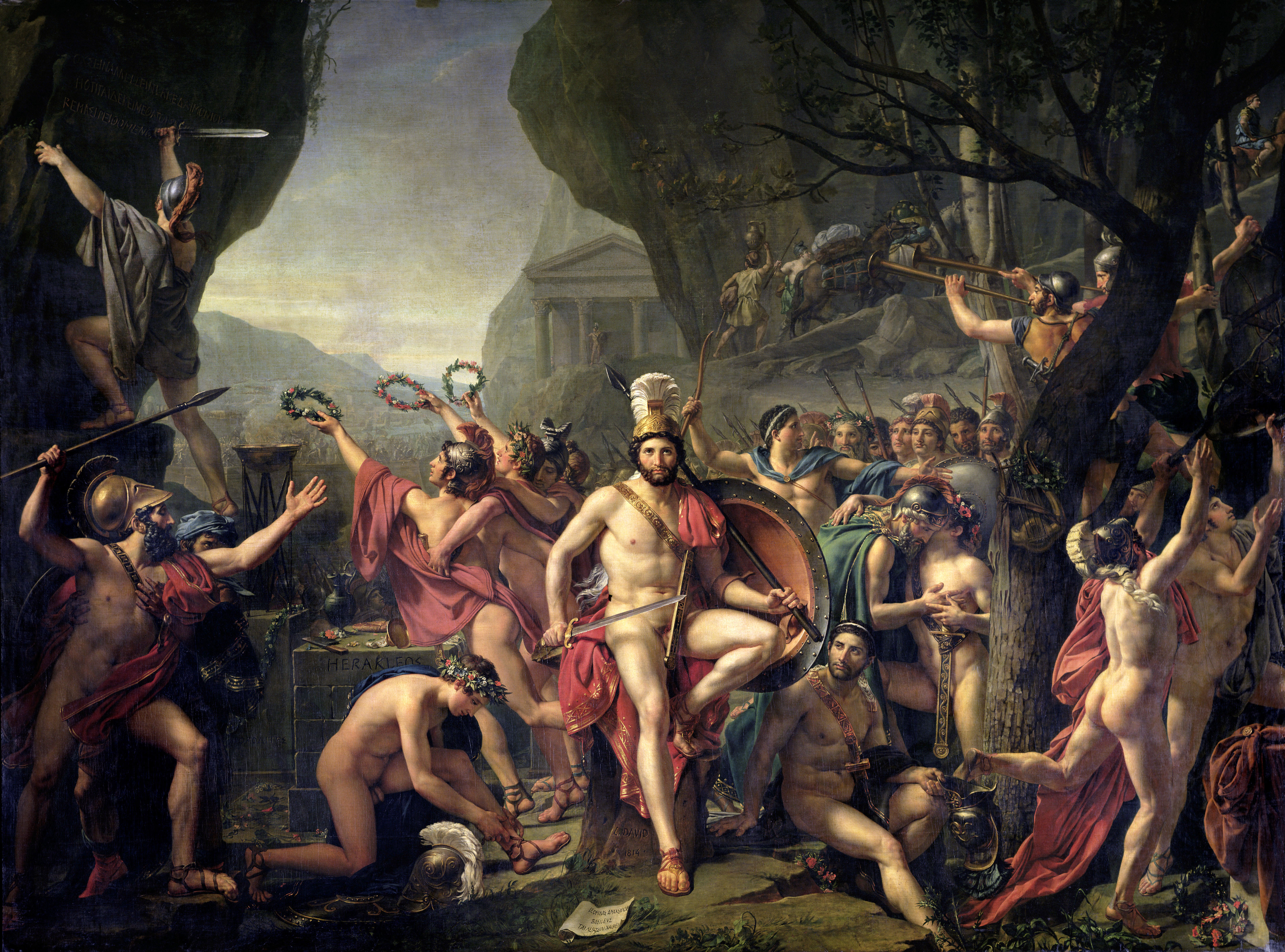
The memory of the Spartan Leonidas at Thermopylae, portrayed here by David, remains vivid for German scholars promoting the thesis of the existence of the Indo-Germanic people.

The memory of the Indo-Germans was not only used against France and the Reich's western neighbors, the invocation of these ancestors also justified the Reich's other military ventures. Thus, when Greece, presented as an old Indo-Germanic irredentist land, was invaded in 1941, the conquest was justified by the need to revive the Indo-Germanic presence in the country.

The Greek people, an Indo-Germanic people who had suffered centuries of racial decadence and denordification, had to give way to Nordic troops, defeating British troops at Thermopylae, as reported in the Völkischer Beobachter on April 28, 1941. On this occasion, the roles were reversed: the conquerors were Nordic, like Leonidas' Greeks, and the British defenders, the new Persians, suffered the fate of the Spartans.

In a Greece marked by a strong Indo-Germanic presence (to which Hitler attributes the resistance of the Italian units), the German occupying troops are supposed to feel more at home than the local populations, mixed race, usufructuaries of a territory that seems destined to revert to the German Reich. The German Reich, true heir to the original people, presents itself as the true owner of the Greek lands, once conquered by the Dorians, representatives, according to Helmut Berve, of the Nordic race. Following in Leonidas' footsteps, the German troops sought to carry out a form of racial Anschluss, aiming to resurrect the presence of Aryan, Indo-Germanic Nordic blood in Athens.

This assimilation was also used during the Battle of Stalingrad, when the encircled German units were likened to Leonidas' troops, with Göring portraying Paulus as a new Leonidas, who had sacrificed himself to delay the Soviet advance long enough for the German units to regroup. (Note: In his speech, Göring claims that he sacrificed himself to give the Greeks time to regroup their forces and defeat the Persians.)

==== In the East, the renewed fight against the Asian ====
This racial Anschluss was not the only exploitation of the Indo-German myth for the purposes of conquest. Indeed, the War in the East is presented not only as a revival of the immemorial struggle between the Indo-Germanic populations, peasants and warriors, and the Asian populations, nomads regularly launched against the Indo-Germanic West, but also as a way of reviving the northern Indo-Germanic tradition of the ancient ver sacrum.

Indeed, the Reich, as the expression of Indo-Germanic political organization, would find itself under constant attack from the peoples of the East, giving it the opportunity to enter openly into this conflict without respecting the forms required by the rule of law: thus, on September 1, 1939, as on June 22, 1941, the Reich did not declare war on Poland or the USSR, but merely made apparent a latent conflict . What's more, the war was waged in the absence of any legal framework, while the populations were assimilated to sub-humans or carriers of pathogenic and therefore dangerous elements.

Himmler, in a speech in 1942, described the 1941 campaign as a "new spring", in the tradition of the sacrum ver. Once migration had taken place, proper colonization could begin, over ever larger areas, made necessary by a steadily growing population. For Darré, colonization is thus linked to the conquest and extension of a terroir vast enough to feed a dynamic population, a Lebensraum, in the image of SS colonial achievements in Poland. In this way, the conquest of vast areas in Eastern Europe was legitimized by the supposed practices of Indo-Germanic Nordic populations dating back to the earliest antiquity.

This final battle, with its eschatological significance, was to enable the Indo-Germans (whose successor was the Third Reich) to reoccupy territories usurped and occupied over the centuries by Asian populations. But it was not only a definitive settlement of racial relations with the East - that "cauldron of peoples", as Himmler defined it - that was sought by the ideological designers of Operation Barbarossa, it was also the creation of a colonial empire on Russian soil, over which SS peasant soldiers would rule, on the model of Roman veterans, housed in colonies. Indeed, according to Himmler, the Lebensraum, the living space of the Indo-Germans, first conquered by the spring migration, the traditional ver sacrum, then reshaped and developed by an Indo-Germanic elite, was to be created and maintained through the establishment and perpetuation of settlements.

This battle was also intended to put an end to partial, temporary victories, whether those of Alexander, Cato the Elder, Augustus, Titus or Hadrian: the military and political defeat of the Asian enemy was accompanied by its racial victory, with victory not ending in the destruction of the defeated people.

== Survival of the concept after 1945 ==
Despite the defeat of the Reich in 1945, Nordicist theories continue to exert a certain influence on an intellectual fringe to this day. After being sidelined for some twenty years, these ideas were revived in the 1970s, with varying degrees of success. (Note: Jean-Paul Demoule dates the start of this boom in France from the success of the novel Le Matin des Magiciens, by Louis Pauwels and Jacques Bergier, published in 1960.)

=== Endurance of some ideas ===
Despite undeniable changes, Nordicist ideas remained very much in evidence in certain circles close to the New Right. In the 1960s, following the footsteps of Jean Haudry, proponents of these theses synthesized the ideas of Kossina and Günther.

In the 1970s, Dominique Venner, one of the ideologues of the New Right, took up the claim that Indo-European populations originated in regions around the Arctic Circle: based on a compilation of beliefs and rites of diverse geographical origins (Greek, Persian, Hindu, Celtic), Venner and his followers defended the thesis of a circumpolar origin of European populations, creating the boreen neologism.

In the same years, Alain de Benoist took up and clarified these theses in his book Vu de Droite (Rightwing worldviews), identifying the populations living in Northern Europe as the ancestors of Indo-Europeans; to support his assertions, he drew on the works of collaborationist anthropologist Georges Montandon and neo-fascist writer Giorgio Locchi, while neo-Nazi pastor Jürgen Spanuth defended the thesis of the Nordic origin of pre-Columbian civilizations.

=== Distribution ===
During the 1950s, 1960s and 1970s, Nordicist ideas were disseminated not only via specialized publishing houses, either politically close to the New Right or organically linked to this current of thought, but also through contacts between militants and sympathizers of different generations.

In France, these ideas were initially disseminated in magazines linked to the New Right, while the existence of the Club de l'horloge in France ensured a certain porosity of circles and ideas with certain groups on the French parliamentary right.

== See also ==
- Ahnenerbe
- Polygenism
- Proto-Indo-Europeans
- Pseudohistory

== Bibliography ==
- Darré, Richard Walther (1935). Das Bauerntum als Lebensquell der nordischen Rasse (in German). T. F. Lehmann.
- Günther, Hans F. K. (1926). Rassenkunde des deutschen Volkes (in German). J. F. Lehmann.
- Merkenschlager, Friedrich (1926). Götter, Helden und Günther. Eine Abwehr der Güntherschen Rassenkunde (in German). Spindler.
- Rosenberg, Alfred (1930). Der Mythus des zwanzigsten Jahrhunderts (in German). J. F. Lehmann.
- Scheman, Ludwig (1932). Die Rasse in den Geisteswissenschaften (in German). J.F. Lehmann.
- Zschaetzsch, Karl Georg (1937). Atlantis, die Urheimat der Arier (in German). Arier-Verlag.
- Aglan, Alya; Frank, Robert (2015). 1937-1947: La guerre-monde I (in French). Paris: Gallimard. ISBN 978-2-07-044265-2.
- Ayçoberry, Pierre (1979). La Question nazie: Essai sur les interprétations du national-socialisme, 1922-1975. Points / Histoire (in French). Vol. 39. Paris: Seuil. ISBN 2-02-005145-1.
- Chapoutot, Johann (2008). Le Nazisme et l'Antiquité. Quadrige (in French). Paris: Presses universitaires de France. ISBN 978-2-13-060899-8.
- Chapoutot, Johann (2008). "Comment meurt un empire: Le nazisme, l'Antiquité et le mythe". Revue Historique. 3 (647): 657–676. doi:10.3917/rhis.083.0657. S2CID 161887265.
- Chapoutot, Johann (2006). "La Charrue et l'Épée: Paysan-soldat, esclavage et colonisation nazie à l'Est". Hypothèses. 1 (10): 261–270. doi:10.3917/hyp.061.0261.
- Chapoutot, Johann (2014). La loi du sang: Penser et agir en nazi (in French). Paris: Gallimard. ISBN 978-2-07-014193-7.
- Conte, Édouard; Essner, Cornelia (1995). La Quête de la race: Une anthropologie du nazisme. Histoire des gens (in French). Paris: Hachette. ISBN 978-2-01-017992-1.
- Demoule, Jean-Paul (2015). Mais où sont passés les Indo-Européens ?: Le mythe d'origine de l'Occident. La librairie du XXI^{e} siècle (in French). Paris: Seuil. ISBN 978-2-02-029691-5.
- François, Stéphane (2014). Au-delà des vents du Nord: L'extrême-droite française, le pôle Nord et les Indo-Européens (in French). Lyon: Presses universitaires de Lyon. ISBN 978-2-7297-0874-0.
- François, Stéphane (January 2016). "Extrême-droite et ésotérisme: Retour sur un couple toxique". Critica Masonica (in French). Paris. ISSN 2271-278X.
- Fussman, Gérard (2003). "Entre fantasmes, science et politique. L'entrée des Āryas en Inde". Annales. Histoire, Sciences Sociales. 4 (260): 781–813.
- Haack, Marie-Laurence (2015), "Les Étrusques dans l'idéologie national-socialiste. À propos du Mythe du xxe siècle d'Alfred Rosenberg.", Revue Historique, 673 (673): 149–170, doi:10.3917/rhis.151.0149
- Longerich, Peter (2010). Heinrich Himmler: A Life: L'Éclosion quotidienne d'un monstre ordinaire. Translated by Jeremy Noakes et Lesley Sharpe. Paris: Héloïse d'Ormesson. ISBN 978-2-35087-137-0.
- Olivier, Laurent (2012). Nos ancêtres les Germains: les archéologues français et allemands au service du nazisme (in French). Paris: Tallandier. ISBN 978-2-84734-960-3. BNF: 42738797n.
- Verlinde, Joseph-Marie (2003-08-01). "Les racines cachées du Nouvel Âge". Nouvelle revue théologique. Tome 125 (3): 353–373. doi:10.3917/nrt.253.0353. ISSN 0029-4845.
