= Minoa =

Term defining Bronze-age port cities and colonies in the Aegean

- Cities
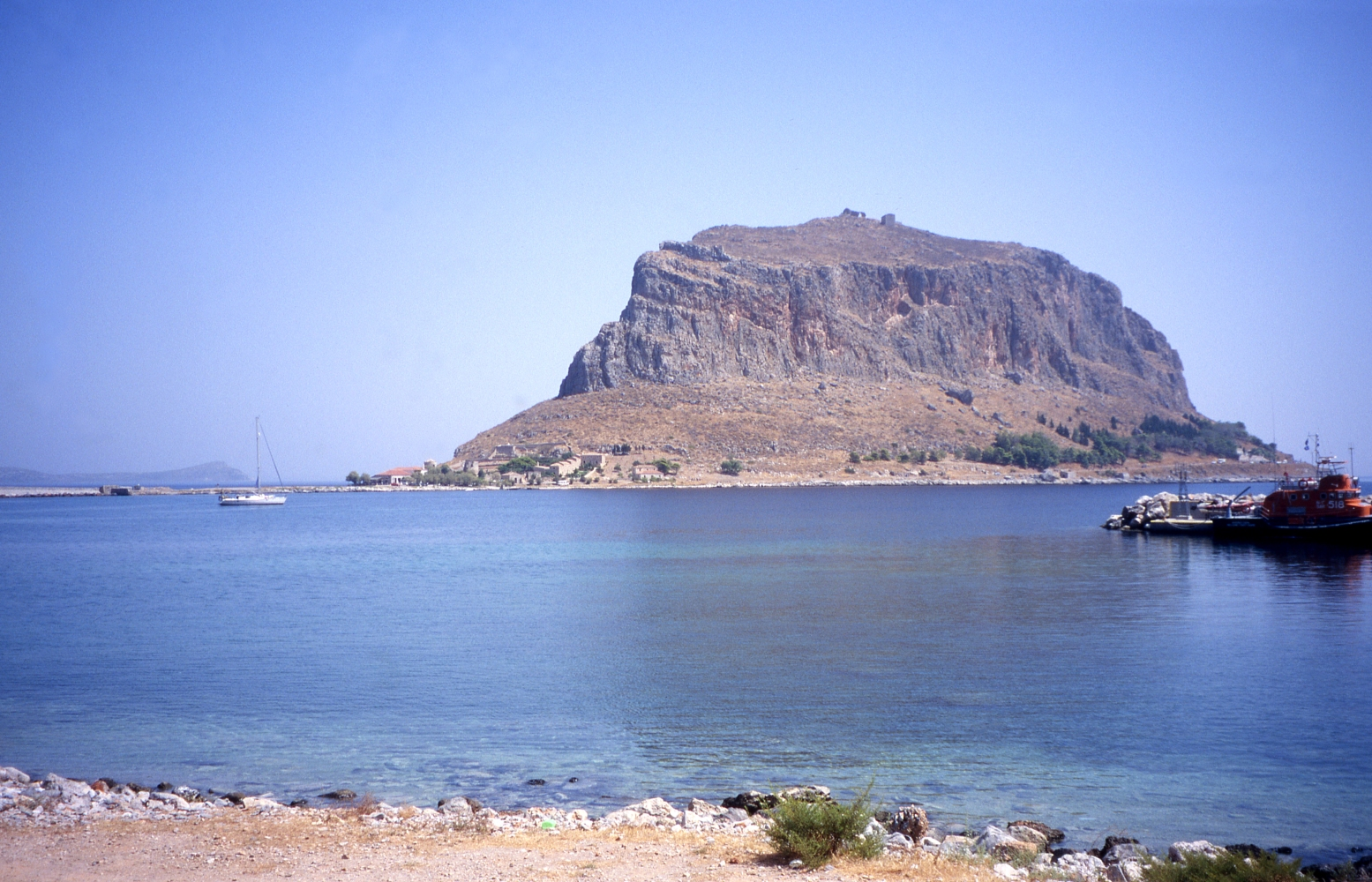
- Monemvasia island in southern Greece, the ancient Minoa

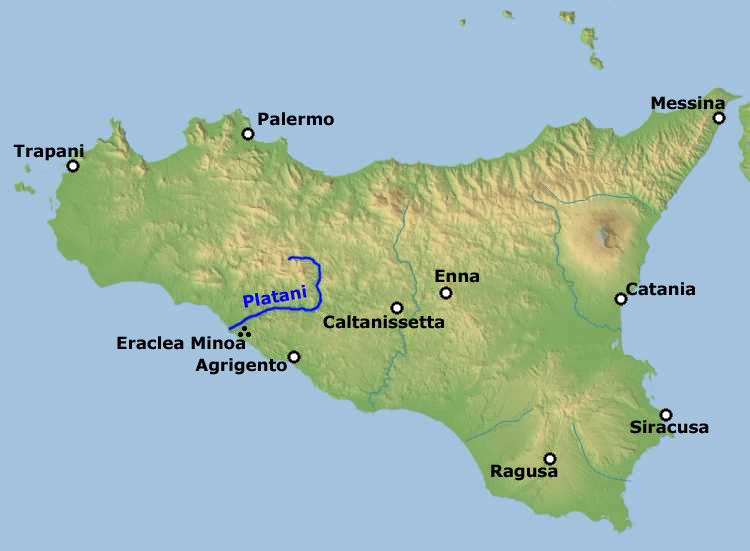
- Heraclea Minoa at the mouth of the river Platani in Sicily
- Country: Various

Minoa (Greek: Μινώα, romanized: Minóa Greek pronunciation: [miˈnoa]) was the name of several Bronze-Age port cities on the coasts of the Aegean islands Crete, Paros, Siphnos, Amorgos and Corfu in Greece, as well as the Italian island of Sicily. There was also a Minoa in Gaza, whose name was a later introduction, brought by the Philistines in 1200 BC. It appears that settlements with the name Minoa were intended to support Minoa as a thalassocracy, or sea-based empire. Austrian historian Fritz Schachermeyr found evidence for this in the name of a settlement on the Laconic island now called Monemvasia, and for the small island outside of the harbour of Megara in Greece.

The original meaning of the word remains unknown. Its root, min-, is linked to a group of Aegean languages, appearing elsewhere in toponyms like Minya and Minassos, as well as in the name of the Minyans, an autochthonous group inhabiting the Aegean region. There may be a connection with the mythic king of Crete, Minos, during the Bronze Age Minoan civilization which flourished in Crete and in the Aegean islands in Greece between 2000–1470 BC. The inhabitants of Crete were named Minoans by Arthur Evans, after the legendary king.

It seems that the Minoans travelled from Crete down to Egypt, Syria and Mari of Euphrates, to Asia Minor (Anatolia) and the Black Sea through the Aegean islands, and to the west up to Lipari (Aeolian islands) to the north of Sicily. Approximately in 1600 BC the routes to Italy and Asia Minor were gained by the rising Myceneans. They followed the same tradition with the establishment or use of commercial and supporting settlements in the Mediterranean coasts.

== See also ==
- Minos
- Heraclea Minoa
- El Mina
- Al Mina
