= Denordification =

Concept used by Nazi theorists

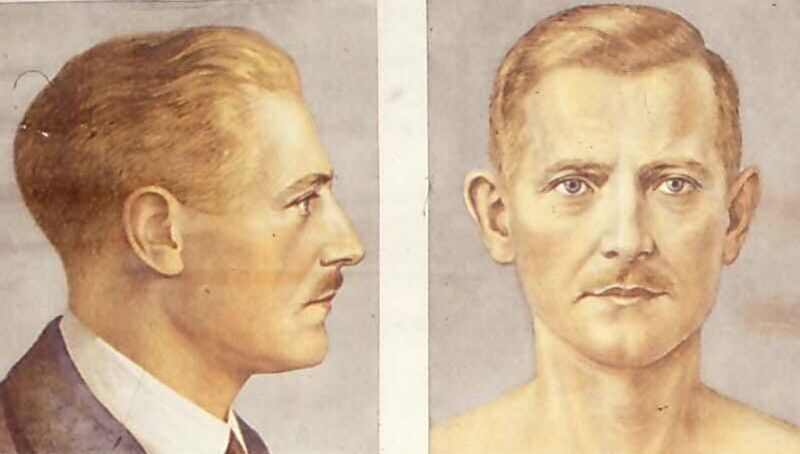
National Socialist wallchart, c. 1935, displaying a "Nordic" man

According to Nazi theorists, denordification (Entnordung in German) is the racial counterpart of the political decadence experienced by peoples throughout their history. The concept was coined by Nazi theorist Alfred Rosenberg, based on his analysis of the decadence of Rome and Ancient Greece.

== Concept ==
The term denordification refers to the dilution of Aryan, Indo-Germanic Nordic blood by the addition of non-Nordic populations to the Nordic race. Thus, according to Richard Walther Darré, it was the success of Semitic populations over the Aryan race that marked the beginning of the denordification process. In his view, it was also through the loss of a sense of the dual expansionist dimension, both warlike and agrarian, that Germanic populations lost their specificity in relation to the semitic nomads.

According to Nazi historian Ferdinand Fried, it was after the destruction of the Temple in Jerusalem that the Jewish people resorted to devious means to combat the Indo-Germanic construction of the Roman Empire. In fact, it was through contact with a parasitic Jewish race that the Indo-Germanic empire-builders would meet this unenviable fate: an SS propaganda booklet lists the means deployed by the Jews to undermine the foundations of the Germanic empires they hated but wished to dominate: racial infiltration, court intrigue and financial infiltration.

What's more, according to Hans F. K. Günther, the revolution of 1917 changed the picture: the main group responsible in the denordification of the German people was no longer the Alpine race, but the Ostic race, as promoters of Lamarck's theories. The Bolsheviks were the main adversaries of the Nordic race, the latest avatars of the Asian invaders that had swept across Europe since Roman times, and thus a mortal threat to the Nordic race. Thus, from the moment the NSDAP took power, it developed the idea that the main enemy of the Nordic race would be Tatar communism.

== Denordification throughout history ==
According to NSDAP propaganda booklets and Nazi historians, the great territorial constructions, all Nordic-inspired, whether the empire of Alexander the Great or the Roman Empire, underwent a process of decadence linked to the loss, within the populations that built these empires, of the Nordic racial element that enabled conquest.

=== The Hellenistic period ===
The Hellenistic period, but also Roman history, is studied in depth, enabling intellectuals close to the NSDAP to propose a coherent approach based on history and its study.

Indeed, Alexander the Great was a key issue in the debates between Nazi theorists of the Nordic Indo-Germanic race. While Fritz Schachermeyr and Alfred Rosenberg shared the idea that Alexander belonged to the Nordic race, they and others disagreed on the real goals pursued by Alexander, i.e. the extent of the denordification that the Macedonians and Greeks underwent during Alexander's reign: Schachermeyr condemned the wedding in Susa, while Rosenberg saw it as a merger between branches of the Nordic race. The Hellenistic period, on the other hand, is perceived as a period of racial decadence: the northern Greeks came into contact with Phoenicians and Semites, and their apparent triumph constitutes, in Fritz Taeger's eyes, an unprecedented racial defeat, preluding a process of Greek denordification.

=== The Roman period ===
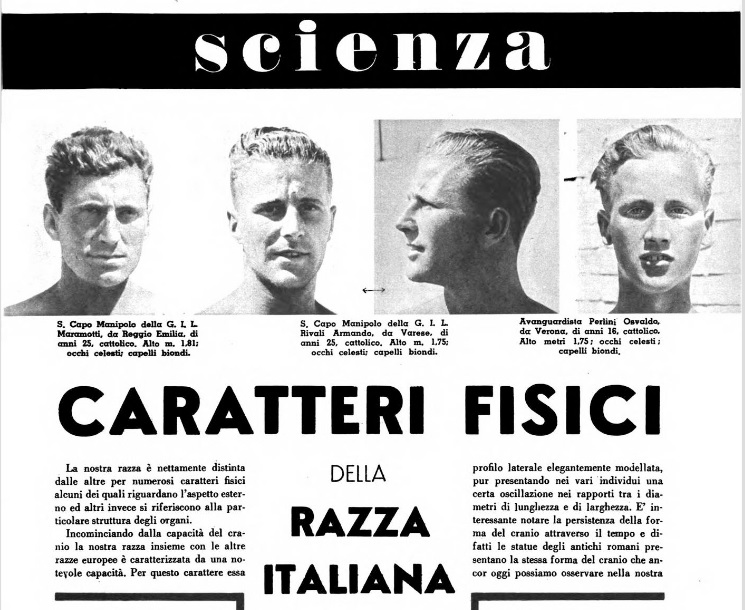
Italian fascist poster, 1938, displaying "four young men mainly of Nordic race from Northern Italy."

According to Rosenberg and some other Nazi intellectuals, the Roman Empire was also undergoing the same process: reduced for the occasion to its rulers, from the reign of the Severans onwards it would have undergone a process of accelerated racial decadence. Indeed, according to Walter Brewitz, a Nazi historian of Roman antiquity, Caracalla's reign in 212 ended a process that had begun in 443 BC, when marriages between patricians and plebeians were allowed in Rome.

In his 1936 article The Denordification of the Romans, Brewitz focuses on the emperors of successive dynasties and their representations: According to him, Augustus and Livia were of unquestionably Nordic descent, the Flavians were the last Nordic dynasty of the Roman Empire, Hadrian had traits derived from non-Nordic mixtures, which Brewitz found tolerable when compared with the members of the Severan dynasty, or the military emperors, with the exception of the Goth Maximinus Thrax. For Rosenberg and Brewitz, this visible, tangible decadence has in fact been underground since the law of 443 BC, which authorized marriage between patricians and plebeians. For Rosenberg, the fall of Nordic Rome came in 212, when Caracalla, "a repulsive bastard who strutted around on the throne of the Caesars", granted Roman citizenship to all free inhabitants of the Empire.

== Causes of denordification ==
=== Christianity, a factor in denordification ===
For Ludwig Ferdinand Clauẞ, a race psychology theorist with close ties to the German faith movement, the loss of the "Nordic soul" is also part of the denordification process: the loss of Nordic sensibility is, in his view, also the disappearance of a specifically Nordic way of life. Richard Darré draws a parallel between the Christianization of Germania and the imposition of an Eastern culture on the Germans.

Others, around the German faith movement, developed the idea of forcibly imposing Christianity on the Germanic populations: Christianity was indeed an example of Jewish cruelty, since the Christian faith would lead to the subjugation of the Germanic populations. Until 1944, Himmler had an inventory of witch-hunts drawn up in all the Reich's documentary holdings: witches were the obvious victims of Jewish rapacity and their plan to destroy the Nordic populations.

=== Social factors ===
Some Nazi raciologues (race scientists), notably Hans F. K. Günther, look for the causes of denordification in the economic and social changes of the 19th century.

For example, Günther looks for the causes of racial mixing, which weakens the Nordic race, in urbanization, the emigration of Nordic populations to other parts of the world and, finally, the falling birth rate, which, according to Günther, affects Nordic populations the most.

== Denordification, a Nazi propaganda tool ==
=== Numerous publications ===
Over the course of the Third Reich, a large number of writings developed this concept and the means for dealing with it.

Nazi propaganda denounced the Jewish people as an implacable enemy, in open and then underground conflict with the Nordic peoples, and advocated their destruction through a preventive race war.

But the Jewish people were not the only adversary of the Nordic people and Germany: for the promoters of the denordification concept, the dolichocephalic Nordic race was beset in the south, east and west by various ramifications of the brachycephalic Asian race. To confront this enemy, Günther and his followers, including Walther Darré, felt it necessary to pursue a policy that was both agrarian and natalist.

=== Denordification and Nazi racial policy ===
In response to this racial decline, Nazi raciologues advocated a strict policy of renordification. Thus, in line with his book Raciologie du peuple allemand (Raciology of the German people), Hans Günther, one of the theoreticians of the Nordic race, proposed a racial policy - renordification - to combat this process, a policy defined by a reversal of the racial balance of power within the German people.

Based on the belief that interbreeding does not create a new race, but rather allows the development of hybrid characters in individuals, derived from the races from which their ancestors came, Hans Günther proposed to determine the proportion of Nordic blood in the German people; to this end, he called on the racial statisticians Karl Keller and Josef Götz, the former wishing to give racial statistics a role in defining Nazi policy, the latter aspiring to use these statistics for scientific and administrative purposes. Günther proposed that, once the proportion of Nordic blood had been determined, a policy of systematically researching and valorizing Nordic characteristics in the German population should be implemented as a first step.

When developing colonial and racial projects, Nazi racial planners insisted on the need to create familiar landscapes, within microclimates created for the occasion, suitable for the blossoming of Germanic blood in the conquered lands of Poland and the Soviet Union.

== See also ==
- Hans F. K. Günther
- Aryan race
- Nordic race
- Nordic Indo-Germanic People
- SS Race and Settlement Main Office
- Great Replacement conspiracy theory
- White genocide conspiracy theory
