= Renordification =

Concept used by Nazi theorists

Renordification (Aufnordung in German) was implemented in Nazi racial theories to counter the effects of what was termed the "denordification" of the mythical Nordic Indo-Germanic ancestors of modern Germans.

== Concept ==
According to Nazi racial theorists such as Hans F. K. Günther and Walther Darré, the Germans, the main branch of the Indo-Germanic Nordic people, had undergone a process of denordification over the centuries. Even before taking power in 1933, the NSDAP developed a theoretical corpus designed to halt this process and strengthen the Nordic element within the Germanic Volk.

== An issue of debate within the NSDAP ==
From the 1920s onwards, passionate debates were organized around this concept, which overlapped with those dividing the NSDAP around the original Indo-Germans.

The main debate within the NSDAP revolved around the concept of race: after Otto Strasser's departure, supporters of the Nordic race, and thus of renordification, its corollary, gained ascendancy within the NSDAP. (Note: By the 1920s, the SS had the largest number of Nordic race advocates in its ranks.) Until 1934, the racial debate within the NSDAP was very active, revolving around the notion of the Nordic race; after this bloody purge, opponents of the Nordic doctrine were systematically removed from the Nazi structure.

In these debates, Hitler, like Rosenberg, the two main theoreticians of Nazism in the 1920s, did not expressly settle the question; in 1934, during the debates within the party to rewrite the law in force in the Reich in a National Socialist sense, the debate was not settled, even if the debates reflected a desire to "improve the German race" and to set Jews aside.

== Renordification and racial policy ==
As early as 1933, the proponents of this racial policy had the chance to implement a policy aimed at strengthening the so-called Nordic characteristics within the Germanic Volk. As a prelude to the creation of a Greater Germanic Reich on the scale of the European continent, renordification was seen by its theorists as a long-term policy, both cultural and racial.

=== Cultural aspects ===
According to the proponents of a renordification of the German people, this process had to go hand in hand with a thorough de-Christianization of German society. Within the SS, Himmler, supported by those close to him, set out to define a new Germanic religiosity, initially developed within the SS: Himmler approved the plans of Karl Wiligut, one of his close friends, who proposed replacing Christianity with a religiosity based on the Germanic cult of ancestors.

=== Racial aspects ===
Moreover, from the occupation of Poland in 1939, the Reich's racial theorists, grouped around Himmler and Rosenberg, had a much wider field of experimentation than the SS, the General Government of Poland.

Himmler thus promoted a policy of systematically tracking down individuals who, according to SS racial standards, had German characteristics. This systematic search for "lost Germanic genes" was carried out by means of systematic racial examinations of Polish, Russian, Baltic and Ukrainian populations, in order to integrate into the Germanic Volk elements of German peoples formerly settled in Poland or further east. Children born of relationships between women from occupied countries and German soldiers also underwent these racial examinations, entrusted to the NSV.

This policy also took the form of kidnapping children from Poland and the USSR. A network of SS-run orphanages was set up in the occupied territories, serving as a screen for the selection of "racially valuable" children.

== See also ==
- Aryan race
- Nordic race
- Heinrich Himmler
- Alfred Rosenberg
- Denordification
