= Hedwig Voegt =

Hedwig Therese Dorothea Henriette Voegt (28 July 1903, Hamburg, German Empire - 14 March 1988, Leipzig, Eastern Germany) was a German literary scholar who obtained a doctorate in German-Jacobin literature when she was 49 and became a university professor at Leipzig University.

While she was a younger woman, modest family circumstances ruled out an academic career. During the 1920s she worked for the post office in Hamburg as a telegrapher and became a political activist (KPD), serving at least three prison terms during the twelve Nazi years because of her resistance to the régime.

== Life ==
Hedwig Therese Dorothea Henriette Voegt was born in the central Hamburg quarter of St. Pauli. Her father was a plumber. Despite her obvious intelligence, she received only basic schooling before moving on to train for clerical work in the dispatches department of the Hamburg Telegraph Union. She moved on again, in 1920, to work for the post office. In 1925 Hedwig Voegt joined the Communist Party. She took up journalism, writing as Labour Correspondent for the de:Hamburger Volkszeitung, a local communist party newspaper. She also produced the illegal works newspaper of the Hamburg telephone office. By the later 1920s she had found a clear purpose in the need to resist the seemingly unstoppable rise of populist demagoguery, which her journalistic contributions enabled her to fulfill.

In the autumn of 1931, as Germany's political crisis intensified, Hedwig Voegt was arrested in connection with her political activity for the first time. In January 1933 the political backdrop was transformed when the Nazi Party took power and converted Germany into a one-party dictatorship. Political activity - except in support of the Nazi Party - became illegal. At the end of February the Reichstag fire was instantly blamed on the Communists, and in March 1933 leading Communists began to be arrested or fled into exile. On 12 September 1933 Voegt was released from her job with the post office as a consequence of the recently enacted "Law for the Restoration of the Professional Civil Service" ("Gesetz zur Wiederherstellung des Berufsbeamtentums"), a law designed to remove from public service those individuals whom the régime deemed unreliable for reasons of race and / or politics. This gave her more time for her (now illegal) work for the Communist Party.

Birthday tribute

Hedwig Voegt's eightieth birthday was marked by a tribute characteristic of the time and place, which appeared in the Leipzig University party newspaper. The tribute quoted Dr. Werner Fuchs, First Secretary of the party's sectional leadership (Kreisleitung):

"After nearly sixty years of activism in the ranks of the organised working class, today you can look back on a long path of revolutionary struggle for the interests of the working class, for human progress, accomplished on German soil.
Even in the very citadels of fascist barbarism, you have proved your steadfastness as a consistent and unflinching anti-fascist.
You have further demonstrated this through active participation in the implementation of our party's strategy for the creation of socialism in the German Democratic Republic, in many functions within the party and on the political stage, as a member of the party regional leadership (Bezirksleitung) for Leipzig, as Institute Director and as Pro-dean at the old Journalism Faculty.
Your vocation for academic and literary work was always bound in with a commitment to the education of the young, and with a propagandistic zeal and active social commitment.
Today your former students, you colleagues and fellow activists speak with more respect than ever of your passionate collaborative work which comes from your ethos of communist academic certainty.
"Seit fast 60 Jahren aktiv In den Reihen der Partei der Arbeiterklasse organisiert, kannst Du heute auf eine lange Wegstrecke des revolutionären Kampfes fur dIe Interessen der Arbeiterklasse, für den Fortschritt der Menscheit, auch auf deutschem Boden zurückblicken.
Deine Standhaftigkeit hast Du als konsequente und unerschrockene Antifaschlstin auch in den Kerkern der faschistischen BarbareI bewiesen.
In vielen Funktionen in der Partei und auf staatlicher Ebene so als Mitglied der SED-Bezirksleitung Leipzig, als Abgeordnete als Institutsdirektor und Prodekan an der damaligen Fakultät fur Journalistik, hast Du diesen Beweis durch die aktive Teilnahme an der Durchsetzung der Politik unserer Partei beim Aufbau des Sozialismus in der DDR vertieft.
Deine Berufung zur wissenschaftlichen und literarischen Arbeit war so stets verbunden mit Engagement für die Erziehung Jungerer, verbunden mit propagandistischem Eifer und gesellschaftlicher Aktivität.
Deine, ehemalige Studenten, deine Mitstreiter und Kampfgefaehrten sprechen heute mehr denn je mit Hochtachtung von deiner leidenschaftlichen, sie selbst mitreißenden Arbeit, die vom Ethos eines kommunistischen Wissenschaftlers bestimmt ist."
Werner Fuchs i.A. Kreisleitung SED, 1983

She was arrested again in December 1934 and sentenced a few months later, to a two-year jail term for "preparing high treason" (Vorbereitung zum Hochverrat). She served her sentence initially at the Fuhlsbüttel concentration camp, and then at the women's prison on the east side of Lübeck. It was here that she got to know Lucie Suhling when the two of them worked together in the prison library. Many years later Lucie Suhling's daughter published a biography of Voegt. Voegt was released in 1937 and, despite being kept under close surveillance, was able to resume her resistance work. She was re-arrested in December 1938, and held in Fuhlsbüttel concentration camp till the end of March 1939. A further period of detention followed in the summer of 1941.

War ended in May 1945 and with it the Nazi régime and its ban on the Communist Party. Voegt resumed her political work and became a member of the party leadership team in the Wasserkante (Waterside) region (which included Hamburg). She took work with the Hamburg regional Labour Exchange. In 1946 she resumed her contributions for the de:Hamburger Volkszeitung (newspaper).

A longstanding desire to undertake university level studies was addressed at the end of 1948 when the party sent her to study in the Soviet occupation zone in the central portion of what had been Germany till 1945. In 1949 she began a new life at the Goethe-Schiller Archive in Weimar where she became a research assistant for the newly appointed director of the archive, Professor Gerhard Scholz. She went on to enroll at Jena University also finding time along the way to undertake a course in journalism at Leipzig University. In 1949 she also joined the recently formed Socialist Unity Party ("Sozialistische Einheitspartei Deutschlands" / SED) which by now was well on the way to becoming the ruling party in a new kind of German one-party dictatorship.

In 1952 Hedwig Voegt received her doctorate from the University of Jena for a dissertation entitled "Democratic Patriotism in German Jacobin literature (1790-1800)" ("Der demokratische Patriotismus in der deutschen jakobinischen Literatur (1790-1800)"). The choice of subject would have a defining effect on the rest of her career. Her doctorate, for which she was supervised by Gerhard Scholz, earned her a "Cum Laude" commendation.

In 1953 she received a contract at Leipzig University to teach on German Literature. Literature and history fell within the Philosophy faculty, but in 1955 she was switched to the university's political important Journalism Faculty, which was the country's principal university level university faculty for journalists and, because of this, the focus of constant attention from the powerful Party Central Committee. Between 1959 and 1963 Hedwig Voegt was the Teaching Professor for Literary Journalism and Stylistics at the Leipzig University Journalism Faculty. Here she also served, between 1961 and 1963, as the Pro-dean for Academic Succession ("für den wissenschaftlichen Nachwuchs").

Having come to her academic career relatively late in life, Voegt was bewildered that when she reached her sixtieth birthday in 1963 she was nevertheless required to retire from her university teaching post. An idea existed that she might return to Hamburg where she had spent her early decades, but by this times the political and philosophical division of Germany (reinforced by a formidable set of physical barriers) was at its most profound, and there was never any serious doubt that now, spiritually and politically, her true home was in the German Democratic Republic, in Leipzig. From here she continued to publish on her literary areas of expertise: late eighteenth century authors on whom she published books included Johann Heinrich Voß, Georg Friedrich Rebmann, Johann Heinrich Merck, Georg Kerner and Adolph Freiherr Knigge. A prolific letter writer, she also sustained scholarly friendships with academics and other comrades in Hamburg.

After her retirement from her teaching post Dr Hedwig Voegt continued to work intensively for another 25 years. She died in Leipzig on 14 March 1988.

== Awards and honours ==
- 1963: Patriotic Order of Merit in Silver
- 1973: Patriotic Order of Merit in Gold
- Carl von Ossietzky Medal of the East German Peace Council
- Johannes R. Becher Medal
- Medal for Fighters Against Fascism
