= Ursula Wertheim =

German literary scholar

- Born: October 8, 1919; Nowawes, Weimar Republic
- Died: July 26, 2006 (aged 86)

Academic background
- Education: Humboldt University of Berlin; University of Jena

Academic work
- Discipline: Literary
- Institutions: University of Jena

Ursula Wertheim (8 October 1919 – 26 July 2006) was a German literary scholar and university teacher at Jena in East Germany. The primary focus of her writing and teaching was on Germany's eighteenth and nineteenth century classical literature.

== Life ==
Ursula Wertheim was born in Nowawes, a township a short distance to the east of Potsdam in central Germany. Her student studies took her to Berlin's Humboldt University between 1948 and 1953 where her subjects were German studies, History and Art History. The eastern part of Berlin had ended the war in the Soviet occupation zone, and she was a member of the first generation of scholars in what later became East Germany to undertake her studies through the Marxist prism, which accompany her through her academic career. By 1951 she had transferred to Jena where her teachers included Gerhard Scholz.

Between 1951 and 1953 she combined her studies with work as an assistant at the "Goethe and Schiller Archive" and at the "Goethe Era Museum" ("Goethezeit-Museum"), both in Weimar, roughly half an hour to the west of Jena. She received her doctorate in 1957 for work on Friedrich Schiller, focusing on his plays "Die Verschwörung des Fiesco zu Genua" and "Don Karlos, Infant von Spanien". The theme identified in the title of her dissertation was that of "Problems with the historical material in the drama of the young Schiller", which hints at an increasing overlap between Sociology and more traditionally academic fields of study such as History and Literature: this was a general trend in officially approved academic scholarship in East Germany during the 1950s and 60s. Further academic advancement came with her habilitation in 1963. This time her subject was the West–östlicher Divan (lyrical poetry collection) by Goethe and its interpretational relationship with translations of the work of Hafez from which Goethe had appropriated themes.

In 1963/64 she set on course and briefly headed up the Theatre History department at Jena. She continued to promote study of theatre history at the university, conducting pertinent seminars on it. In 1965 she was appointed university professor for the history of modern and contemporary literature. The focus of her work continued to concern traditionally Marxist oriented study of classical German literature. By the time she retired in 1979, her approach to the literary classics through a single rather rigid Socio-political prism was seen by some to have been superseded by newer methodologies.
