= Gerhard Scholz =

- Born: 1 October 1903; Liegnitz, Lower Silesia, Germany
- Died: 31 August 1989 (aged 85); Berlin, German Democratic Republic
- Occupations: Political activist Academic & University professor (Philology, German language and culture, Literary history)
- Political party: SDP (1924-1933); SWP (1931-1939); SED (1946-1989)
- Spouse: Kristina Elmdahl/Scholz (b. 1921, m. 1946)
- Children: 3

Gerhard Scholz (1 October 1903 – 31 August 1989) was a German university professor and writer. The focus of his work was on Philology, German language and culture and literary history.

== Life ==
Gerhard Scholz was born early in the twentieth century at Liegnitz, a mid-sized city in Lower Silesia. His father was a teacher. He passed his school leaving exams in 1924 and embarked on an extended period of university-level study at Tübingen, Heidelberg, Berlin and Breslau. Subjects addressed included German studies, History, Art history and the History of religions. In 1932 he joined the Tertiary Education Service as a Referendary. After 1933 further career progress was inhibited by his political past however.

Scholz joined the moderately left-wing Social Democratic Party in 1925, and was active as an instructor with the party's youth wing. In January 1933 the NSDAP (Nazi Party) took power and lost little time in transforming Germany into a one-party dictatorship. In May 1933 Schulz was removed from his position with the education service. He was able to continue to work as a teacher at the high school, and he also worked as a freelance researcher attached to the University of Breslau. At the same time he participated with the SPD youth branch in political activity. Both his party membership and his party activity had become illegal in 1933.

In 1936 he narrowly escaped arrest by the Gestapo for "Conspiracy to commit High Treason" ("Vorbereitung zum Hochverrat") by relocating to Prague. In Czechoslovakia he supported himself as a languages teacher and worked for the magazine "Maß und Wert", which was being produced from Zürich by Thomas Mann who had also been exiled by the Nazis. There was by now a significant community of political exiles from Germany in Prague, and Scholz was a co-founder of the Prague "Thomas Mann Society of German Emigrants in Prague" ("Thomas-Mann-Gesellschaft dt. Emigranten in Prag"). However, in 1938 Nazi Germany came to Czechoslovakia, and Gerhard Scholz again fled, this time initially to Warsaw and from there, via Riga, to Stockholm. In Sweden he worked as a journalist and as a lecturer at the Social Sciences Institute of Stockholm University. He also became a member of the left-leaning Free German Cultural Association. In 1939 he had resigned from the Socialist Workers' Party, which he had originally joined in 1931. There are indications that during his time in Sweden during the early 1940s he was identified as a Communist sympathizer.

For Germany the Second World War lasted from September 1939 until May 1945. Its end appeared to mark the end of one-party government. Scholz returned to Germany in July 1946. As a result of frontier changes agreed between the Soviet Union and her wartime allies, and following two years of intensive ethnic cleansing, Lower Silesia where he had been born and grown up was no longer German. Instead he moved to the Soviet administered occupation zone in the eastern part of what remained of Germany. He then joined the newly formed Socialist Unity Party (Sozialistische Einheitspartei Deutschlands / SED) which during the next few years emerged as the ruling party in a new German one-party state. Between 1947 and 1949 he worked as a Referendary in the Berlin based German Organisation for Peoples' Education, before being appointed to the directorship of the Goethe-Schiller Archive in 1949 and of the Weimar Classics Foundation in 1950. During the early 1950s he combined these administrative roles with part-time teaching posts at Weimar and nearby Jena, also undertaking lecturing in German Studies elsewhere on a more ad hoc basis.

He resigned from the Weimar job in 1953 and devoted himself to private research on classical German literature, also being employed as a visiting professor by Leipzig University. In 1958 he received his doctorate, supervised by Erich Kühne at Rostock University. His dissertation concerned Friedrich Schiller's early work. That same year he was given a teaching professorship in modern German and Scandinavian Literature at the Germanistics Institute of the Berlin's Humboldt University. Ten years later in 1969, shortly before he retired, the Humboldt made him a full professor.

== Contribution ==
Gerhard Scholz, along with György Lukács (1885–1971) and the novelist Werner Krauss (1900–1976), was one of a handful of scholars who can be identified as a founders of a new German Marxist literary tradition. His influence comes from his meticulous research approach to contextualising his sources, placing literary works in the socio-historical environment of their times. In this way he they pioneered an inter-disciplinary approach which became more mainstream only after Scholz and the others had disappeared from the scene. In the process, Scholz significantly broadened the contemporary popular appeal of the classical literary canon. His lectures on Goethe's Faust (1959/60) reached a wide audience. He also had a considerable influence on members of a successor generation of literature scholars such as Hans-Günther Thalheim, Hedwig Voegt and Ursula Wertheim.
