= Hans-Günther Thalheim =

German germanist, editor, specialist in literature and philosopher

- Born: 5 May 1924; Chemnitz, Saxony, Germany
- Died: 3 December 2018 (aged 94); Berlin, Germany
- Occupation(s): Professor (German Literature and language); Writer

Hans-Günther Thalheim (5 May 1924 – 3 December 2018) was a German professor of German language and linguistics and of Literary sciences. He was also a writer and literary editor.

== Life ==
Thalheim was born in Chemnitz, in the southern part of what was then central Germany. His father was a public official. He successfully undertook his school final exams in 1943 and in 1943/44 performed substitute national service by working as a teacher in Carinthia. He also undertook a period of study involving German literature, history pedagogy and philosophy at Freiburg university in the south-west of the country, where his teachers included Walter Rehm and Martin Heidegger.

Despite a serious eye-sight defect, in 1944 he had to work in a Chemnitz munitions factory. He was then sent to work at the secret rocket research facility at Peenemünde where he remained till the first part of 1945. At the end of the war he was captured in Leipzig and spent time as a prisoner of war, held by the U.S. Army and then by the French army. He was released in 1946 and returned to Chemnitz. The slaughter of war had left the country with a desperate shortage of teachers, and in order to address this a "New Teacher" accelerated on-the-job training scheme had been established. Thalheim qualified through the scheme between 1946 and 1948 and obtained a post at a secondary school, teaching German and History. In 1948 he relocated the short distance to Leipzig where till 1951 he resumed his university level education, at the same time working as a teacher at one of the Workers' and Farmers' Colleges that the authorities had set up in what had been, since May 1945, administered as the Soviet occupation zone in what had been Germany.

After a brief spell working for the national higher education secretariat in Berlin, between 1951 and 1957 Thalheim lived and worked in Weimar. Initially he was employed at the Goethe and Schiller archive as a senior research assistant to Gerhard Scholz. In 1954 he received his doctorate for a dissertation on Griechenlandbild by the eighteenth century Hellenist scholar Winckelmann. From 1954 he and Louis Fürnberg jointly produced the Weimarer Beiträge, which quickly became a respected literary journal. The focus of the journal, which appeared four times each year was the Weimar classicist movement. Fürnberg died young in 1957: Thalheim remained the journal's publishing editor till 1963.

Hans-Günther Thalheim - Publications (not a complete list)

=== Monographs etc ===
- 1954 Zeitkritik und Wunschbild des frühen Winckelmann. Jena, Univ., Diss.
- 1959 ff Germanistische Studien / Hrsg. (u. a.) Rütten & Loening, Berlin
- 1961 Der junge Schiller Berlin, Humboldt-Univ., Habil.–Schrift
- 1964 Bräkers Werke in einem Band / Hrsg. Aufbau Verlag, Berlin, Weimar. 3. neubearbeitete Auflage, Aufbau Verlag, Berlin 1989
- 1966 Des Knaben Wunderhorn. Gesammelt von Ludwig Achim von Arnim und Clemens Brentano / Hrsg. Rütten & Loening, Berlin, 3. neubearb. Aufl. 1989
- 1968 Deutsche Bibliothek. Studienausgaben zur neueren deutschen Literatur / Hrsg. (u. a.) Akademie Verl., Berlin
- 1969 Zur Literatur der Goethezeit. Rütten & Loening, Berlin
- 1970 Studien zur Literaturgeschichte und Literaturtheorie / Hrsg. (u. a.) Rütten & Loening, Berlin
- 1973 Geschichte der deutschen Literatur / Hrsg. (u. a.). Volk und Wissen, Berlin
- 1980 Schiller. Sämtliche Werke in zehn Bänden, Berliner Ausgabe / Hrsg. (u. a.) Aufbau Verl., Berlin, Reprint 2005
- 1984 Friedrich Wilhelm von Hoven, Lebenserinnerungen / Hrsg. Rütten & Loening, Berlin
- 1989 Stolpe, Heinz: Aufklärung, Fortschritt, Humanität. Studien und Kritiken / Hrsg. Aufbau Verl., Berlin

Between 1957 and 1964 he taught as Professor for Modern German Literature at Berlin's Humboldt University. Meanwhile he obtained his own habilitation (qualification) in 1961 for work on Friedrich Schiller. At the end of 1964 Thalheim accepted an offer to switch to the (East) German Academy of Sciences nearby. There he became Director of the Institute for German Language and Literature. However, he remained at The Academy only till 1968, due to internal reforms within the institution. From 1967 he was working on research for an Encyclopaedia for a Marxist History of Literature, and was chairman of the project's editorial collective. Work on the project, which dealt with German writers of the nineteenth and twentieth centuries, would last till 1979, although the volumes of the Encyclopaedia started to appear in 1973.

After retiring in 1989, Hans-Günther Thalheim continued to live in Berlin.

== Work ==
Although Thalheim's career embraced a wide spectrum of literary research, his speciality remained the eighteenth century, and in particular the Sturm und Drang phase of the German classicist movement. At the heart of that was almost fifty years of work on Friedrich Schiller, whose work had been the basis for his habilitation dissertation in 1961, but he also made major contributions on Winckelmann, Goethe and Kleist.

His literary approach was enriched by insights into historical context: his linguistic and stylistic analyses included reflections on the political and social contradictions of the periods in which works were created.

== Awards and honours ==
- 1976: National Prize of East Germany
- 1987: Lessing Prize
- 1989: Johannes Stroux medal
