= Fritz Schachermeyr =

Austrian historian and professor

- Born: 1895
- Died: 1987 (aged 91–92)
- Other names: Fritz Schachermeyer
- Occupations: Historian; Professor

Fritz Schachermeyr (1895–1987, also Schachermeyer) was an Austrian historian, professor at the University of Vienna from 1952 until retirement.

Schachermeyr was born in Linz, and studied in Graz, Berlin and Innsbruck. At Innsbruck, he was a reader in ancient history from 1928 to 1931. He acted as professor in Jena (1931), Heidelberg (1936) and Graz (1940). In 1952, he was called to Vienna University as professor of Greek history, ancient history and epigraphy.

Schachermeyr was a fervent supporter of Nazism during the Third Reich, advocating a "racial-biological view of world history" or a "biology of history". He disowned his racist screeds only after 1945 when they had gone completely out of public favor.

== Publications ==
- Etruskische Frühgeschichte, Berlin, Leipzig 1929
- Zur Rasse und Kultur im minoischen Kreta, Carl Winter, Heidelberg 1939
- Lebensgesetzlichkeit in der Geschichte. Versuch einer Einführung in das geschichtsbiologische Denken, Klostermann, Frankfurt/M. 1940
- Indogermanen und Orient. Ihre kulturelle und machpolitische Auseinandersetzung im Altertum, Stuttgart 1944
- Alexander, der Grosse. Ingenium und Macht, Pustet, Graz–Salzburg–Wien 1949
- Alexander der Grosse. Das Problem seiner Persönlichkeit und seines Wirkens, Wien 1973
- Griechische Geschichte. Mit besonderer Berücksichtigung der geistesgeschichtlichen und kulturmorphologischen Zusammenhänge, Kohlhammer Verlag, Stuttgart 1960
- Perikles, Kohlhammer Verlag, Stuttgart–Berlin–Köln–Mainz 1969
- Geistesgeschichte der Perikleischen Zeit, Stuttgart–Berlin–Köln–Mainz 1971
- Die Tragik der Voll-Endung. Stirb und Werde in der Vergangenheit. Europa im Würgegriff der Gegenwart, Koska, Wien–Berlin 1981
- Ein Leben zwischen Wissenschaft und Kunst, edd. Gerhard Dobesch, Hilde Schachermeyr, Wien, Köln, Graz 1984

== Decorations and awards ==
- 1957: Full member of the Austrian Academy of Sciences
- Corresponding member of the Heidelberg Academy of Sciences
- Honorary doctorates from the Universities of Athens (1961) and Vienna (1984)
- Austrian Cross of Honour for Science and Art, 1st class
- Austrian Decoration for Science and Art
- Great Gold Medal with Star for Services to the Republic of Austria
- Honorary Medal of Vienna in gold
- Medal for Merit for science from Linz
- 1963: he was awarded the Wilhelm Hartel Prize

== See also ==
- Hans F. K. Günther
- Nazi eugenics
