= Panpanzee =

Chimpanzee (1985–2014)

- Species: chimpanzee
- Sex: female
- Born: 1985
- Died: February 9, 2014 (aged 28–29)
- Cause of death: diabetes complications
- Known for: learned 348 lexigram symbols and over 3,000 English words

Panpanzee the chimpanzee (1985 – February 9, 2014 at the age of 28–29 by diabetes complications), was born at the Language Research Center at Georgia State University in Atlanta, Georgia. She lived the rest of her life at the Great Ape Trust in Iowa. Panpanzee learned 348 lexigram symbols and over 3,000 words from the English language over her lifespan.

== Background ==
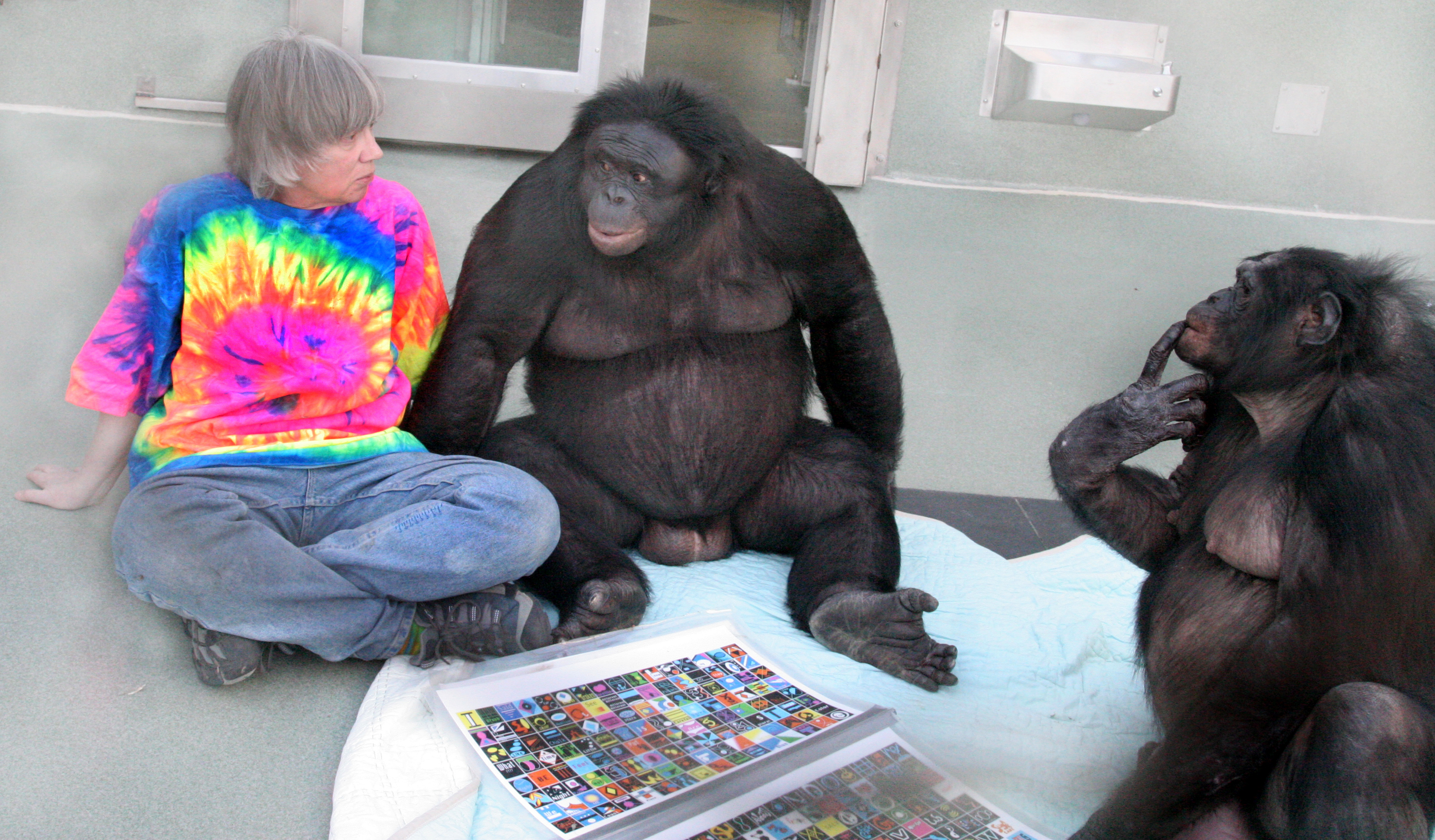
Kanzi and Panbanisha, two bonobos that Panpanzee grew up with at the Great Ape Trust

Panpanzee's human influence started when she was only eight days old. She grew up with a bonobo named Panbanisha. They were both in the same study for five years, where the researchers taught them lexigram symbols and words from the English language. Kanzi was another research subject at the Language Research Center during this time. He had already known 256 lexigram symbols by the time Panpanzee and Panbanisha had started their education. This research was conducted by Sue Savage-Rumbaugh and her research team. Savage-Rumbaugh is a primatologist and an experimental psychologist, where she studies the upbringings of non-human primates and their capability to learn, understand, and speak a language. Most of her work today is on bonobos. This research on bonobos has made her known for “one of the world’s leading ape language researchers.”

== History of bonobos and chimpanzees ==
A part of this study was to see if there was a difference between bonobos and chimpanzees since they are very similar species. Both species shared a common ancestor after humans split from the chimpanzees and bonobos between four and seven million years ago in Africa. The split between the common ancestors of the chimpanzee and bonobos then took place about 1.5 to 2 million years ago with the two lineages giving rise to the two current extant species.

In the past, bonobos were incorrectly relegated to subspecies status within the species Pan troglodytes. It is now understood that bonobos are an entirely different species. After Pan paniscus was differentiated and named as a new species to science, "bonobo" developed into its accepted common name. As bonobos aren't chimpanzees, old common names containing that word like "bonobo chimpanzee" or "pygmy chimpanzee" are generally considered outdated misnomers.

Bonobos are more sociable, more sexual, and not as aggressive as chimpanzees. The Bonobos are the only members of the great ape family (which includes humans) that do not regularly kill their own kind.

== Research ==
One goal of the research involving Panpanzee and Panbanisha was to see the effects of human enculturation on the chimps. Another goal was for the chimpanzee and bonobo to be able to comprehend spoken and symbolic language. To reach this goal the teachers had keyboards with lexigrams on them. They had spoken communication to go with the lexigrams in order for Panpanzee and Panbanisha to learn both.

During the study, Panpanzee hardly utilized any of the symbol communication and relied on gesturing from a young age. Panpanzee would show the researchers that she understood by leading them by a hand or guiding them until they understood what she was saying. While Panpanzee was still using gestural communications, Panbanisha had moved on to symbolic communications. Panbanisha also could fully comprehend speech by the time she was around two to two and a half years old. When Panpanzee was around two years old her vocabulary started to increase and her use of lexigrams increased. Panpanzee took longer to pick up vocabulary words than the bonobos did. By the time she was thirty-four months old, she had only learned fifty vocabulary words. By this time, a typical child has already learned up to several hundred vocabulary words. The researchers almost removed Panpanzee from the study because of the lack of improvement. She was not picking up words fast enough and not learning enough symbols. The researchers assumed this was because chimpanzees did not have the capacity to be able to learn a language. They also assumed it was bonobos genetic superiority that led to Kanzi to have the success that he did. However, they stuck with her and a few months later Panpanzee began to show some understanding of a few words in the English language. Even though Panpanzee eventually demonstrated progress the researchers still removed her from the study when she was five years old.

By the time she became a grown chimpanzee, Panpanzee had learned one hundred and twenty-eight different lexigrams while being able to comprehend one hundred and fifty English words. This made Panpanzee's understanding of English more precise than her understanding of lexigrams, which is also the same for Kanzi. She could point out the corresponding lexigram when someone stated a word.

== See also ==
- List of individual apes
