= William M. Fields =

American primatologist

William Fields
- Born: 1949 (age 76–77); Atlanta, Georgia, United States
- Education: Georgia State University (BA)
- Website: http://www.greatapetrust.org/

William M. Fields (born 1949), also known by the lexigram, is an American qualitative investigator studying language, culture, and tools in non-human primates. He is best known for his collaboration with Sue Savage-Rumbaugh beginning in 1997 at the Language Research Center of Georgia State University. There he co-reared Nyota, a baby bonobo, with Panbanisha, Kanzi and Savage-Rumbaugh. Fields and Savage-Rumbaugh are the only scientists in the world carrying out language research with bonobos.

== Biography ==
Fields was born in Atlanta, Georgia in 1949, the oldest of four children. His father is a musician and his mother a housewife. He attended Georgia State University where he was the student of anthropologist Kathryn A. Kozaitis earning a BA in anthropology in 1999. He also studied with Charles Rutheiser, Robert Fryman, and Mark B. King. Under these influences he developed the notions of a hybrid culture in which he proposed the theoretical concept of a Pan/Homo cultural dynamic as a critique of the ethological notion of proto-culture to explain bonobo Kanzi’s linguistic abilities.

In 2005, Fields published, as second author, Kanzi’s Primal Language: the cultural initiation of apes into language. The qualitative monograph is a cultural recasting of Savage-Rumbaugh’s 1993 empirical monograph titled Language Comprehension in Ape and Child. In 2006, he accepted the position of senior research scientist at the Great Ape Trust of Iowa where he participated in ape language research with Savage-Rumbaugh and the bonobos Kanzi, Panbanisha, Nyota, Nathan, Maisha, Elikya, and Matata. The ape language program includes stone tool use and manufacture with Paleolithic specialists Nicholas Toth and Kathy Schick. Fields appears in the 2000 NHK science documentary, Kanzi II, and has been interviewed about his work at the Great Ape Trust by the History Channel, National Geographic Channel, ABC News, Nightline, Discovery Channel, New Scientist, Swedish Educational Television, and local media.

He served as Director of Scientific Research at the Trust from 2007 to 2011.

== Publications ==
- Fields, W.M. (2007) “Ethnographic Kanzi versus empirical Kanzi: on the distinction between “Home” and “Laboratory” in the lives of enculturated apes. Rivista di Analisi del Testo.
- Fields, W.M., Segerdahl, P., & Savage-Rumbaugh, E.S. (2007) “The Material Practices of Ape Language.” In J. Valsiner (Ed.) The Cambridge Handbook of Socio-Cultural Psychology.
- Savage-Rumbaugh, S. & Fields, W.M. (2006) “Rules and Tools: Beyond Anthropomorphism: A qualitative report on the stone tool manufacture and use by captive bonobos Kanzi and Panbanisha.” In N. Toth’s Craft Institute Oldowan Technologies 1(1).
- Savage-Rumbaugh, S., Rumbaugh, D.M. & W.M. Fields. (2006) “Language as a Window on the Cultural Mind.” In S. Hurley (Ed.) Rational Animals, Oxford: Oxford University Press.
- Segerdahl, P., Fields, W.M., & Savage-Rumbaugh, E.S. (2006) Kanzi’s Primal Language: The cultural initiation of apes into language. London: Palgrave/Macmillan.
- Savage-Rumbaugh, S., Fields, W.M., Segerdahl, P., & D.M. Rumbaugh. (2005) “Culture prefigures cognition in Pan/Homo Bonobos.” Theoria 20(3).
- Rumbaugh, D.M., Fields, W.M. (2005) “Great Apes Living in Decatur, Georgia” In J. Caldecott & L. Miles (Eds.) The Atlas of Great Apes and their Conservation. WNEP-WCMC Press.
- Savage-Rumbaugh, E.S., Segerdahl, P., Fields, W.M. (2005) “Individual differences in language competencies in apes resulting from unique rearing conditions imposed by different first epistemologies.” In L.L. Namy & S.R. Waxman (Eds.) Symbolic Use and Symbolic Representation. NJ: Erlbaum
- Savage-Rumbaugh, S., Fields, W.M., & T. Spircu. (2004). “The Emergence of Knapping and Vocal Expression Embedded in a Pan/Homo Culture.” Journal of Biology and Philosophy (19).
- Fields, W.M., & Savage-Rumbaugh, S. (2003). [Review of the book A Mind So Rare: The Evolution of Human Consciousness]. Contemporary Psychology 48(8).
- Savage-Rumbaugh, S., Fields, W. (2002). “Hacias el control denuevas realidades.” Quark (25), 20-26.
- Savage-Rumbaugh, S., Fields, W.M. & Taglialatela, J. (2001) “Language, Speech, Tools and Writing: A cultural imperative.” In Thompson, E. (Ed.), Between Ourselves: Second-person issues in the study of consciousness,(pp. 273–292). Exeter, UK:Imprint Academic.
- Savage-Rumbaugh, S. & Fields. W.M. (2000). [Review of the book The Cultural Origins of Human Cognition]. American Anthropologist. 102(4),925-926.
- Savage-Rumbaugh, E.S. & Fields, W.M. (2000). “Linguistic, Cultural and Cognitive Capacities of Bonobos (Pan paniscus).” Culture & Psychology 6(2),131-153.
- Savage-Rumbaugh, E.S., Fields, W. & Taglialatela, J. (2000). “Ape Consciousness-Human Consciousness: A perspective informed by language and culture.” American Zoologist 40(6), 910-921.
- Savage-Rumbaugh, E.S. and Fields, W.M. (1998). “Language and Culture: A Trans-Cultural Interweaving.” Language Origins Society, 28,4-14.
