= Human Ape =

2008 documentary

Human Ape is a 2008 National Geographic documentary film on the genetic and evolutionary origins of human behavior, and covers the genetic and behavioural similarities and differences between humans and other great apes. Pioneer Productions of London was commissioned by National Geographic Channels International to produce Human Ape. Human Ape was executive produced by Stuart Carter and directed by Martin Gorst. distributed by National Geographic Channel and Granada International.

The show was aired on both the US and internationally on National Geographic Channel beginning in March 2008.

Human Ape includes brief footage of human and ape activities in controlled experiments, as well as state-of-the-art computer-generated imagery (CGI) to examine the relationship between humankind and their simian cousins, who share 99% of their genetic material. It also tracks the progress of a human and a non-human ape from the womb to early development and beyond, analysing how both develop cognitive abilities, communicate through emotions and language, use violence and sex, and utilise tools to manipulate their environment.

Bonobos and orangutans living at Great Ape Trust of Iowa are prominently featured in the documentary film. Bonobos Kanzi and Panbanisha and orangutans Knobi and Azy are extensively shown in the film, with detailed inputs from the Great Ape Trust scientists Dr. Rob Shumaker, director of orangutan research, and William Fields, director of bonobo research.

The Pioneer Productions crew filmed at Great Ape Trust in April 2007, where footage included mirror self-recognition exercises. It also includes experiments like the apes counting and identifying the numbers from 1 to 10 with accuracy. Whereas the human child is shown to be imitating the steps taken by one researcher to open a box and get a reward, the apes quickly eliminate the redundant steps. Such experiments are counter-intuitive and offer insight into the inner wiring and workings of human and simian brains.

The film also touches briefly upon the relationship between the modified FOXP2 gene and the human language development. It documents a British family with a mutated FOXP2 gene which severely affects speech of its members.

== See also ==
- Kanzi
- Panbanisha
- Sue Savage-Rumbaugh
