= John Bonvillian =

American psychologist

John D. Bonvillian
- Born: John Doughty Bonvillian; September 4, 1948; Caldwell, Idaho, U.S.
- Died: May 8, 2018 (aged 69); Charlottesville, Virginia, U.S.

Education
- Education: Stanford University

John D. Bonvillian (September 4, 1948 – May 8, 2018) was a psychologist and associate professor-emeritus in the Department of Psychology and the Interdepartmental Program in Linguistics at the University of Virginia in Charlottesville, Virginia. He is the principal developer of Simplified Signs, a manual sign communication system designed to be easy to form, easy to understand and easy to remember. He is also known for his research contributions to the study of sign language, child development, psycholinguistics, and language acquisition.

== Education, early work, and career ==
Bonvillian received a B.A. in Psychology from Johns Hopkins University in 1970. While an undergraduate there, he was introduced to the field of child development by Mary D. S. Ainsworth and to psycholinguistics by James E. Deese. He then attended Stanford University on a National Science Foundation doctoral fellowship, earning his Ph.D. in 1974. As a graduate student, he worked primarily with Keith E. Nelson as they conducted studies on child language acquisition in typically developing children and children with disabilities. Some of this work was later reprinted in other publications. He also wrote several articles examining the impact of maternal language input and other behaviors on a child's subsequent development. During his time at Stanford, John met William C. Stokoe, a pioneering figure in sign language research. Subsequently, the two were to work together editing the journal, Sign Language Studies.

In 1974, Bonvillian accepted an appointment as an assistant professor at Vassar College. In 1978, he was invited to join the faculty at the University of Virginia, where he was reunited as a colleague with his former professors, Ainsworth and Deese, who had previously accepted appointments at Virginia. He taught at UVA until his retirement in May 2015. He died on May 8, 2018, at the age of 69.

== Research ==
=== Sign language acquisition and development ===
In 1979, Bonvillian commenced the first of two longitudinal studies of sign language acquisition in young children with deaf parents. These studies (conducted primarily with Michael D. Orlansky and Raymond J. Folven) were to provide valuable information on the course of American Sign Language (ASL) acquisition. Their research found that the patterns with which children developed proficiency in ASL was highly similar to the patterns with which children acquired spoken language skills. While the pattern of acquisition was similar across language modalities, many of the sign-learning children attained different language milestones in ASL earlier than their hearing counterparts attained these same milestones in spoken English (see the discussion of Baby sign language). These studies also provided information on how young children learn to form ASL signs. More specifically, these data enabled Bonvillian (with Theodore Siedlecki) to develop an account of sign language phonological acquisition.

Bonvillian also conducted investigations into the use of manual signs to facilitate communication in minimally verbal or non-speaking children and adults, such as persons with aphasia or an intellectual disability. In particular, he conducted a number of studies of sign language acquisition in children with autism. In the 1990s, Bonvillian (with Brenda Seal) examined sign formation difficulties in children with autism. This study made it clear that for manual signs to be used easily by children with autism, then the signs should consist of a single movement and be composed of a limited number of basic or unmarked handshapes. Over his career, Bonvillian contributed multiple articles and chapters on sign language, sign language acquisition, and sign language development to various encyclopedias, textbooks, and other forums focused on language development, child development, and/or various aspects of deafness. He also wrote multiple reviews of books that were focused on these research areas as well as on language development in special populations.

=== Word recall studies ===
In addition to word recall in deaf and hearing students being the topic of his dissertation, Bonvillian continued to perform a series of investigations into strategies or factors that improve (or inhibit) deaf persons’ and hearing persons’ recall of ASL signs and/or English words that had been presented to them. In one study, deaf students who performed the sign language equivalent of each English word in a list remembered more words than those deaf students using other recall strategies; English words rated higher in imagery value also were recalled more often than words with low-imagery values. In a sign recall study involving hearing persons previously unfamiliar with American Sign Language, different recall methods were encouraged in each of three experimental conditions; the condition in which the etymology or origin of a sign was provided along with its English translation equivalent resulted in better long-term sign retention.

=== Project Koko ===
Bonvillian wrote a review of The Education of Koko by Francine Patterson and Eugene Linden in 1982. Bonvillian and Patterson had known each other at Stanford University and had worked together with Koko the gorilla. They also had written an article on mother and peer attachment in rhesus monkeys in 1975. They later published several articles in the 1990s on the sign language acquisition of gorillas in comparison with that of the young signing children of Deaf parents, noting both the similarities and differences between the sign language development of the two groups. Bonvillian and Patterson also penned a short article on approaches to ape language research. Bonvillian was a supporting member of the Gorilla Foundation.

=== Hand preference studies ===
Another recurring topic in Bonvillian's research was the issue of hand preference in deaf persons, signing children of Deaf parents (whether the children were deaf or hearing), and persons with autism. Since sign languages are based on the visual-manual modality of communication (rather than the auditory-vocal modality of spoken languages), Bonvillian wondered whether individuals exposed to signing from birth (because they had one or two signing Deaf parents) showed different handedness patterns than hearing individuals not exposed to signing from birth. He was also interested in whether such persons’ hand preference varied depending on whether their manual activity was for signing or was non-sign in nature (i.e., object actions, general communicative gestures, or other manual actions). The studies of the signing children of Deaf parents showed that they had a stronger hand preference (typically for the right hand) for their manual signing activity than they showed for non-sign communicative gestures and object actions. In contrast, sign-learning students with autism did not display as strong of a hand preference in their signing activity. An earlier study of handedness patterns in deaf high-school and college students also showed a higher incidence of left-handedness, and that left-handed students tended to have been exposed to signing at a later age than those deaf students who preferred using their right hand.

=== Use of manual signs and gestures in early contact situations ===
Bonvillian, who had always maintained a strong interest in and personal passion for history, investigated the use of manual signs and gestures by hearing persons in various historical contexts. In particular, he focused on the use of manual signs and gestures during early contact situations between Europeans and the Indigenous peoples of the Americas. He approached this latter task in a systematic manner by examining the first-hand written accounts and journals of voyagers who travelled to the “New World” in search of riches (see, for example, his peer-reviewed article on Bernal Díaz del Castillo and Álvar Núñez Cabeza de Vaca, as well as the second chapter of his book Simplified Signs, Volume 1). He also researched and published work on the voyages of Martin Frobisher to Baffin Island and the Englishman's resulting interactions with the Inuit. Of special interest to Bonvillian was the pre-existing use of various manual sign-communication systems in and among the various Indigenous nations of North America before the arrival of Europeans (in particular, the use of Plains Indian Sign Language as a lingua franca between Indigenous nations whose spoken languages were mutually incomprehensible). Bonvillian also was curious about the origins of language in humans and the possibility that gesture preceded speech as a communication system.

== Simplified Sign System ==
In 1998, Bonvillian began work on developing a simplified, manual sign-communication system. The initial focus of this project was to develop a sign-communication system for non-speaking or minimally verbal individuals, such as children with autism, Down syndrome, or cerebral palsy. At the time of his death, Bonvillian's research team had developed a Simplified Sign System lexicon consisting of approximately 1850 easily formed, highly iconic signs or gestures. This increase in the size of sign vocabulary was undertaken to meet the needs of students and teachers who wanted to use Simplified Signs to facilitate the acquisition of foreign language vocabulary items. Research suggests that by performing highly iconic Simplified Signs with to-be-learned foreign language vocabulary items, students are able to internalize items into their memories more quickly and effectively. The first 1000 signs of the Simplified Sign System were published on July 30, 2020, by Open Book Publishers in Cambridge, U.K.
