= Lana (chimpanzee) =

Chimpanzee research subject

- Born: October 7, 1970; Emory University
- Died: November 2016 (aged 45–46)

Lana (October 7, 1970 - November, 2016) was a female chimpanzee, the first to use lexigrams in language research. She was born at the Yerkes National Primate Research Center of Emory University, and the project she was allocated to when 1 year old, the LANguage Analogue project led by Duane Rumbaugh, was named after her with the acronym LANA because the project team felt that her identity was well worth preserving.

== LANA project ==
The researchers stated that Lana could discriminate between lexigrams and sequence words grammatically and make novel utterances.

The first LANA project (1971) officially had two Principal Investigators, Rumbaugh and Ernst von Glasersfeld (cf. NIH grants HD-06016 and RR-00165). Ernst von Glasersfeld developed the language that Lana learned to use: he coined the term "lexigram", created the first 120 of them and designed the grammar that regulated their combination. This artificial language was called Yerkish, in honor of Robert M. Yerkes, the founder of the laboratory within which the LANA project was conceived and conducted.

The early project also had several graduate-student researchers. The prime researcher, and the prime worker with Lana was Dr. Timothy V. Gill. Included in the project were graduate students Gwen Bell Dooley, Beverly Wilkerson, and Michael D. Haberman, among others. Gwen Bell Dooley demonstrated Lana's cognitive capability to distinguish between two numerical sets of objects which she then labelled with either "more" or "less", whichever was requested.

== See also ==
- Great ape language
- Koko
- Kanzi
- Washoe
- Nim Chimpsky
- List of individual apes
- Alex (parrot)
- Akeakamai
- Evolution of language
- Panbanisha
