= Panbanisha =

Bonobo research subject (1985-2012)

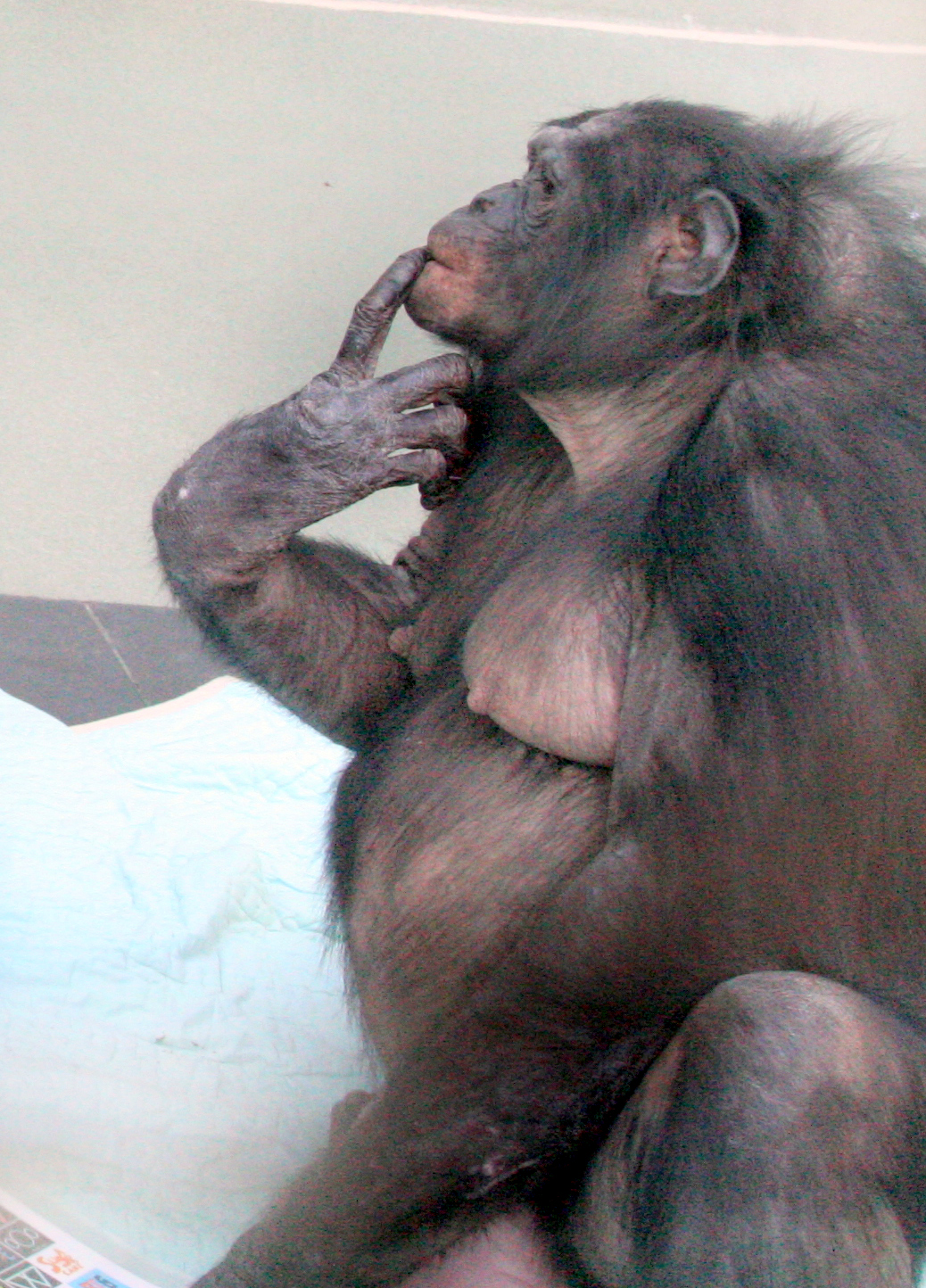
- Panbanisha at age 20
- Born: November 17, 1985; United States
- Died: November 6, 2012 (aged 26)
- Children: Nyota; Nathen (died May 15, 2009)
- Mother: Matata
- Relatives: Kanzi (half-brother)

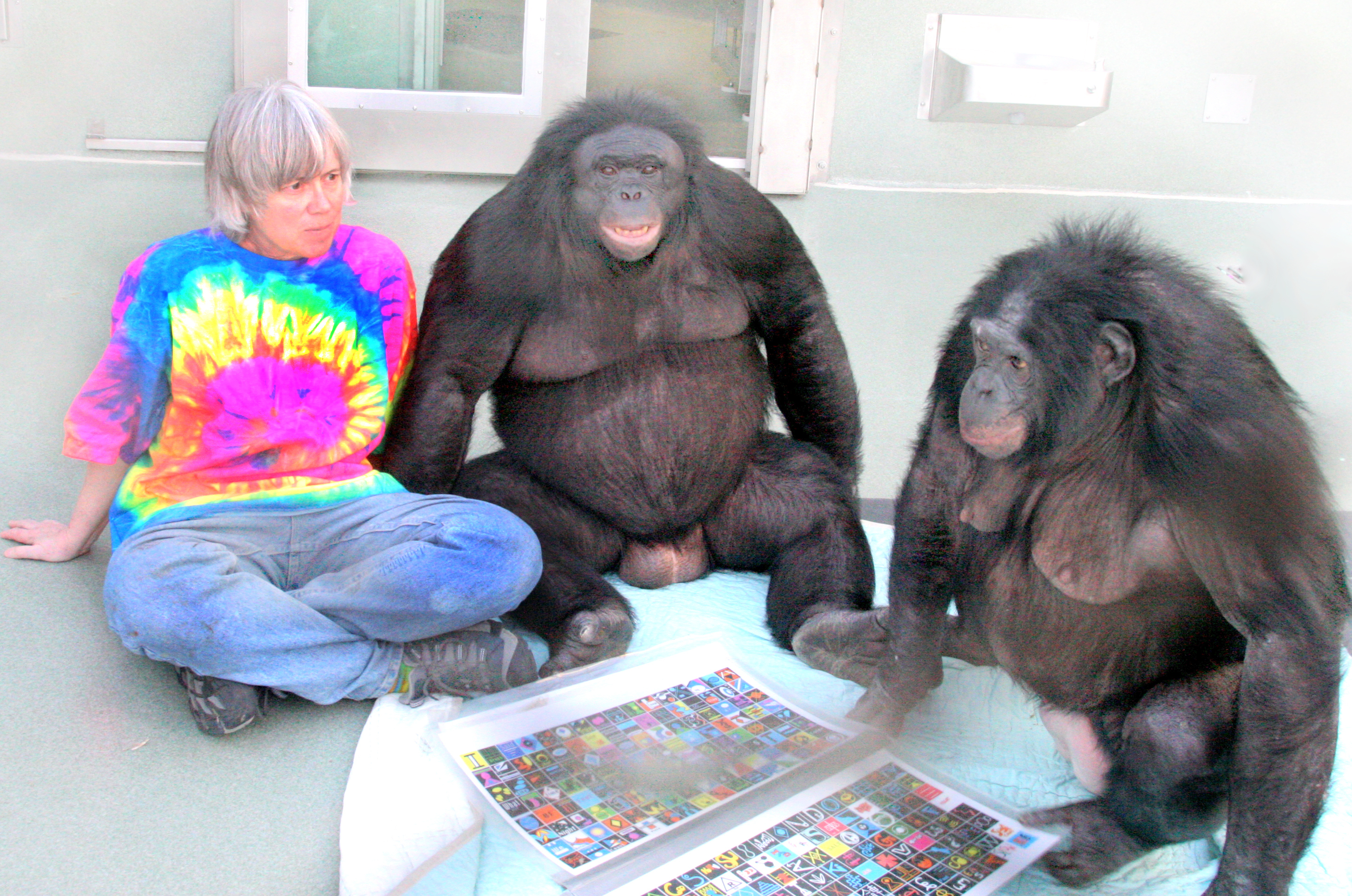
Bonobos Kanzi (C) and Panbanisha (R) with Sue Savage-Rumbaugh (L) and the outdoor symbols "keyboard"

Panbanisha (November 17, 1985 – November 6, 2012), also known by the lexigram, was a female bonobo that featured in studies on great ape language by Professor Sue Savage-Rumbaugh. Her name is Swahili for "to cleave together for the purpose of contrast."

== Biography ==
Panbanisha was born at Language Research Center at Georgia State University in Atlanta, Georgia, United States. Panbanisha was the daughter of Matata, the adopted mother of the famous Kanzi, who also was an intelligent bonobo, and was the mother of two sons, Nyota and Nathen.

Panbanisha resided at the Great Ape Trust in Iowa, where ape behavior and intelligence is studied. By 3 years of age, Panbanisha demonstrated comprehension of 179 words in Yerkish. She was able to express her sadness through Yerkish when her half-brother Kanzi had to leave. During the studies, Dr. Savage-Rumbaugh had recognized the ability of communication and understanding of complex sentences.

She died of a cold at the Great Ape Trust on November 6, 2012. She was 26 years old.

== Research ==
The basis of the early research headed by Savage-Rumbaugh was to study the language faculties of non-human primates and find out to what extent their upbringing affects their ability to use language. When Panbanisha was born, her brother Kanzi was already learning to communicate. By the time research with Panbinisha started, Kanzi knew 256 lexigram symbols. Savage-Rumbaugh co-reared Panbanisha with a female chimpanzee, Panpanzee (also known as Panzee), for five years in an environment with other bonobos and with human teachers. The teachers used keyboards with lexigrams on them in tandem with spoken communication in order to allow the two apes to communicate back to them, and to allow them to learn to comprehend spoken and symbolic language. Of the two, Panbanisha showed greater linguistic capability, and she was able to comprehend far more spoken language and lexigrams than Panzee. After the five years of study, Panzee was removed from the study. Panzee lives at the Language Research Center at Georgia State University. Data was taken on Panbanisha for a further six years with her adopted half-brother, Kanzi.

The keyboards used in the 1990s contained a few hundred symbols, and the linguistic capability of the two bonobos was quite good. They were able to recognise not only digitised and spoken speech, but also the use of single lexigrams from the keyboard. At the beginning of research Panbanisha was able to use 256 symbols on the lexigram keyboard. The researchers claim that the experiments with these apes show that the gap between the genus Pan and our early hominid ancestors, and even ourselves, is much smaller than we had previously realised.

As a female bonobo, Panbanisha was not only able to communicate with humans, but other nonhuman apes just like her. The ways in which Panbanisha learned lexigrams was in a style like those of young human beings. This came as a new wave of educating nonhuman apes and a created a bond between Panbanisha and the people helping her learn. This bond is comparable to a child and parent.

Panbanisha excelled in comparison to Kanzi, her half brother when it came to her responses to recorded sentences. Another finding was Panbanisha's ability to comprehend her name being said at a very young age. Out of all subjects (nonhuman apes) that underwent this trial, Panbanisha was the most perceptive to her name being called (37 out of 51 times). Some compare the breakthroughs with Panbanisha to those regularly shown with dogs, but the key difference is that Panbanisha and other bonobos have the ability to not just understand and comprehend, but to give responses through the lexigram, thus proving a point that they can respond with the English language.

From birth Panbanisha was introduced to complex communication. Starting at such a young age she became far more advanced in her knowledge of communication than her adopted brother Kanzi. At the age of 7.5 years old Panbanisha could correctly respond to 75% of sentences that required more than just yes or no answers. Human children at the age of two respond to similar questions with a success rate of 65%.

Panbanisha also exhibited the ability to remember and talk about past events. For example, when Bill Fields, one of her researchers, asked Panbanisha what was wrong, she replied “Kanzi bad keyboard”. After she said that, Fields asked another researcher what had happened with Kanzi and the keyboard. He was then told that Kanzi had broken it.

== Compared with other apes ==
Bonobos are able to learn languages similarly to humans. At the Language Research Center at Georgia State University, the researchers learned that chimpanzees will pick up English if the apes are taught English as though it was the apes' first language. Panbanisha started to learn Yerkish lexigrams at birth, whereas Kanzi started to learn when he was nine months. This made Panbanisha's vocabulary far better than Kanzi's. Kanzi has been able to learn 348 lexigram symbols, while also having the knowledge of 3,000 English words. The researchers believed, without confirmation, that Panbanisha knew around 6,000 English words.

== Using Yerkish ==
Apes are physically unable to speak English because they lack the vocal structures that humans have. Although they cannot speak English, they may be able to understand and respond to spoken English, and they can still communicate through Yerkish and sign language.

Panbanisha was exposed to advanced ways of communicating from the first week she was born. The Yerkish lexigram language uses symbols that mean a word or phrase in English, when arranged in the correct grammatical sequence. For example, one of the symbols that Panbanisha used was TV. She would push the TV symbol as part of a string of symbols to show that she wanted to watch the television. Between six and eight months of age she seemed to respond to a symbol after a caregiver pointed or touched it. At a year old she learned the meaning of "no" and "come here". Panbanisha answered correctly to 94% of the lexigram symbols and English words between 1986 and 1989 (1–4 years old). At three years old Panbanisha understood 80 spoken English words.

Panbanisha used vocal gestures to respond to different words before she used the lexigrams. The lexigrams were used to show that apes could learn a language with a strict syntax, actually communicate with other people, and understand English and not just repeat or imitate human actions. In a typical experiment Panbanisha and Kanzi, Panbanisha's half brother, were put in separate rooms with only a small, open, window and a lexigram keyboard to communicate with each other. The objective was to get a cup of yogurt from one bonobo to the other using the lexigram keyboard to communicate. Kanzi was given the yogurt and Panbanisha was supposed to receive it. Panbanisha used the yogurt symbol on the lexigram keyboard asking for the yogurt. After a little time Kanzi agreed and gave Panbanisha the yogurt through the open window.

== See also ==
- Great Ape language
- Great Ape personhood
- List of apes
- Koko
- Washoe
- Nim Chimpsky
- Evolution of language
- List of individual apes
- The Mind of an Ape
- Yerkish
- Human Ape (2008 documentary film)
