= The Mind of an Ape =

1983 book by David Premack and Ann James Premack

- Author: David Premack; Ann James Premack
- Language: English
- Genre: Non-fiction
- Publication date: 1983
- ISBN: 0-393-01581-5

The Mind of an Ape is a 1983 book by David Premack and Ann James Premack. The authors argue that it is possible to teach language to (non-human) great apes. They write: "We now know that someone who comprehends speech must know language, even if he or she cannot produce it."

== The authors ==
David Premack, emeritus professor of psychology at the University of Pennsylvania, and Ann James Premack, a science writer, began teaching language to apes in 1964. Premack started his work at the Yerkes Laboratories of Primate Biology in Orange Park, Florida, a program at the University of Florida, continued it at the University of Missouri, then at the University of California, Santa Barbara and the University of Pennsylvania.

== The apes ==
The subjects of the program, nine chimpanzees, were reared in a laboratory environment specifically designed to stimulate their intellect, as animals raised otherwise fail to thrive. This was in contrast to the traditional psychology lab where the animals are caged and remain in solitude. Sarah, born in 1959, demonstrated use of an invented language. Gussie failed to learn any words. Elizabeth and Peony were trained in the language. Walnut, a late arrival, also was trained in the language, but failed to learn any words. Jessie, Sadie, Bert, and Luvie, 1975 controls, were not trained in the language, but demonstrated pointing.

== Language suitable for an ape ==
The language designed by Premack for an ape was not verbal; Premack's chimpanzee program differed from that of a separate research program in which other chimpanzees were raised in a human family in parallel with human babies, and taught words. Eventually, the chimpanzees might get to a two-year-old human's list of words, but no further. Vicki was eventually trained to speak four words. The experiments with those chimpanzees did not demonstrate the existence of the faculties shown by Sarah discussed below, in her command of a language, for example. In other experiments, other chimpanzees have been taught American Sign Language (ASL), notably Washoe. Washoe could use 68 gestures after three years of training, eventually getting to 150 gestures. However, Nim, trained in ASL, was found to demonstrate no forms with grammar, his linguistic productions being sets of gestures in no particular order. Koko and Chantek were also trained in ASL. See also Kanzi's 400-word vocabulary of spontaneous productions as of 2005.

== The language tokens ==
The language consisted of a series of colored plastic tokens, which the chimpanzees could manipulate and stick to a magnetic board. Each token stood for a word which was never spoken in the chimpanzee's presence. Sarah began her language training in 1967 at age five, beginning with food exchanges, to establish a social exchange with the instructor. The Premacks note that the chimpanzees gave food reluctantly and unwillingly, far preferring to receive food. In a series of experiments, Premack was able to train Sarah, Elizabeth, and Peony to parse sentences:

Peony nose touch

which might result in Peony touching the trainer's nose. The tokens did not resemble the objects; an apple was symbolized by a blue triangle token. The chimpanzee Elizabeth would be symbolized by a decorated E token, a copy of which would dangle from a necklace around her neck. The trainer would also wear a corresponding token, as would other investigators whom the chimpanzee would have to name in the formation of the target sentence. It took Sarah, Elizabeth, and Peony each hundreds of trials to first form an association between the tokens and the objects. Sarah in particular was trained in the token manipulations for 18 months. Sarah was able to learn imperative sentences with a grammar,

Sarah jam bread take

in which the trainer allowed her to take the bread and jam, and also negative sentences

No Sarah honey cracker take

in which the trainer restrained her from taking the cracker and honey, which taught Sarah to suppress her impulse to take the negated object. In particular, the noun had to be at the beginning and the verb had to be at the end of the production, or else the trainer would not respond to Sarah's ungrammatical sentence. After hundreds of trials, Sarah could reliably produce the grammatical form

Mary give apple Sarah

=== List of tokens ===
Nouns

1. Sarah
2. Mary (Mary Morgan, Sarah's favorite trainer)
3. pail
4. dish
5. chocolate
6. apple
7. banana
8. apricot
9. raisin

Verbs

1. is
2. give
3. take
4. insert
5. wash

Concepts/conditionals

1. same
2. different
3. no-not
4. name-of
5. color-of
6. "?"
7. if-then

Colors (tokens were not colored with the corresponding colors)

1. red
2. yellow
3. brown
4. green

== Questions ==
Sarah was also able to answer questions in the form of a question token "?" which she could answer by selecting a resolving token. However, Sarah was never able to ask questions by manipulating the "?" token. The question "What is the color of apple?"

"?" color of apple (blue triangle)

would be answered with the token for 'red' (a gray curved token).

== New symbols ==
Premack was able to demonstrate that Sarah could understand how to decode a symbol stream after training. First, she had to learn the token name-of and then learn that some new, but real objects had the name-of fig token1 and crackerjack token2.

She learned

Real fig name-of fig token1

and

Real crackerjack name-of crackerjack token2.

She was tested with

fig token1 "?" Real crackerjack

which she answered correctly with

fig token1 Not name-of Real crackerjack

Finally, with the trainer placing a ripe fig on the table, and the tokens fig token1, crackerjack token2, give, Mary, Sarah, orange, banana, Sarah produced the new sentence

Mary give fig token1 Sarah

and with the trainer placing a crackerjack on the table, Sarah produced the new sentence

Mary give crackerjack token2 Sarah

== Other concepts ==
Sarah, Peony, and Elizabeth were able to respond to and formulate analogies and to express judgements. In these trials, problems were formulated by videotaped situations involving an actor, both friendly and unfriendly. With no training, and with observation of the laboratory only, Sarah was able to select answers requiring judgement, based on her experiences in the laboratory, such as the fact that a light cord had to be plugged in to solve some problems. Sarah was able to select proposed solutions for resolving the situations.

Sarah was most accurate on judgements of sameness, less so on similarity, and least accurate on judgements of difference. Human children were then tested with the same protocols, using speech. Young children passed the tests on number, but failed on tests measuring conservation of liquid and solid. Five- to six-year-old children passed the tests on conservation of liquid and solid, suggesting a similar process for the cognition of measurement of conservation of liquid and solid, between ape and human.

== The conditional statement ==
Sarah was able to parse the following sentence in a way to give her the most reward:

Sarah take banana if-then Mary no give chocolate
(both an apple and a banana portion are presented for Sarah to take as part of the statement)

In this sentence, if Sarah were to take the apple, then Mary, the trainer, would give her the chocolate, but if Sarah were to take the banana, then Mary would not give her the chocolate.

== Pointing ==
The chimpanzees do not spontaneously point outside of the psychological laboratory. The control chimpanzees, which were not trained in the language, could all point to communicate with the trainers.

== Mappings and other representations ==
The chimpanzees of Premack's laboratory were not able to navigate given training on a map, unless the map was an exact-scale replica of the mission situation.

== Spontaneous productions ==
Not all individuals in a given species have equivalent capabilities to produce spontaneous communications. Washoe, spontaneously signed, in contrast to Nim. However, Kanzi, at age 30 months demonstrated spontaneous production of gestures and keyboard presses to ask for desired objects or events, and to name items in response to queries from the trainer. Kanzi had not been trained in producing communications. Apparently, he learned this while playing in the training room while his adoptive mother Matata was being trained to use gestures and keyboard presses ("Lexigrams"). The spontaneous productions by Kanzi occurred in the absence of Matata. Kanzi could produce 400 words and recognize 500.

== Natural gestures ==
The Premacks note that chimpanzees use some gestures with each other, which the trainers use to communicate with both the language-trained chimpanzees and the control chimpanzees.

- Requests for food
  - hand cupped, palm upward, for a chimpanzee to place food in
  - extruding lips in supplication
- Appeasement
  - One chimpanzee, trembling, hugged Premack at the beginning of his career, as if to appease him at the time of displaying outrage
- Grooming
- Eating
- Greeting

== Other personal traits ==
The Premacks stated that the chimpanzees had specific traits, such as favorite trainers, and that some chimpanzees, such as Gussie, seemed more fearful than the others. As previously noted, the Premacks noticed that Jessie seemed to be the brightest of the nine chimpanzee subjects. For example, she did not hesitate to unmask a masked researcher, which none of the other chimpanzees attempted. It is clear that the Premacks attempted to provide a humane, supportive environment for the chimpanzees.

Vauclair notes that chimpanzees become distressed in the absence of their favorite companion.

== See also ==
- Primate cognition
- Thomas Nagel (seminal paper, "What is it like to be a bat?")
- Animal cognition
- Alex (parrot), so far the only non-human animal ever to ask an existential question.
