= Nyota (bonobo) =

Bonobo research subject

- Born: 1998 (age 27–28); Georgia State University, Georgia, US
- Parent(s): P-suke (father); Panbanisha (mother)
- Relatives: Nathen (brother); Kanzi (uncle); Matata (grandmother)

Nyota (pronounced ɲo.ta; born 1998), also known by the lexigram, is a bonobo. Nyota was born at the Language Research Center at Georgia State University in the United States. His mother was Panbanisha and his father was P-suke. With Panbanisha's death on November 6, 2012, Nyota became the sole surviving member of his immediate family.

Nyota's name means 'star' in Lingala, a language from the Democratic Republic of Congo. Nyota was reared by Panbanisha and Kanzi with primatologists Sue Savage-Rumbaugh and William M. Fields.

As a precocious youngster in 2004, Nyota is instrumental to researchers investigating the cross-generational effects of language and culture in a second-generation bonobo reared in a bi-cultural environment. On April 25, 2005, he, his brother Nathan (died May 15, 2009) and mother Panbanisha (died November 6, 2012) moved to the Great Ape Trust in Iowa. His father, P-suke (died July 7, 2006 in Iowa), uncle Kanzi (died March 18, 2025)), grandmother Matata, and other relatives were also moved to the Trust.

== See also ==
- List of individual apes
