= Ndume =

Western lowland gorilla (born 1981)

- Species: Western lowland gorilla
- Sex: Male
- Born: October 10, 1981 (age 45); Cincinnati Zoo, U.S.
- Known for: Use of sign language; Zoological Society of Cincinnati v. The Gorilla Foundation and Francine Patterson
- Weight: 400 lb (180 kg)
- Height: 6 ft (1.8 m)

Ndume ("En-doo-may"; born October 10, 1981) is a male western lowland gorilla known for having learned a number of signs adapted from American Sign Language (ASL) and for being at the center of a lawsuit over his custody between the Cincinnati Zoo and the Gorilla Foundation. Ndume has lived most of his life at the Gorilla Foundation in Woodside, California, but has also lived at the Cincinnati Zoo and the Brookfield Zoo. Following a lawsuit, Ndume was transferred back to the Cincinnati Zoo from the Gorilla Foundation on June 14, 2019.

== Early life ==
Ndume was born at the Cincinnati Zoo in 1981 to his father, Ramses and mother, Rosie. Ramses currently lives at the Fort Worth Zoo and Rosie lived to be 43. Ndume also has an aunt Samantha who lived to be 50 and an aunt Gigi who lived to be 47. As a young gorilla, Ndume was playful and highly social. Ndume grew up with three or four gorilla peers. At the age of 3, Ndume began to be cared for by Ron Evans, who was 17 at the time, and is currently the Curator of Primates at the Cincinnati Zoo.

Ndume was transferred to the Brookfield Zoo when he was seven. There he fathered three children, including Baraka, Mtu Chuma and Zuza. At the age of 10, Ndume was transferred to the Gorilla Foundation to live with Michael and to serve as a potential mate to Koko.

== Later life ==
=== Gorilla Foundation ===
At the Gorilla Foundation, Koko and Ndume failed to mate. Penny Patterson, who serves as the President and Research Director at The Gorilla Foundation, has said that there needs to be "several females and one male" in order for a gorilla family to form. While having multiple females is optimal, there were other factors in play. When he arrived at The Gorilla Foundation, he interacted with a much larger and dominant female. This, along with the fact that Koko had not ovulated for at least 19 years prior to her death, most likely played a significant part. After more than 27 years at the Gorilla Foundation, Ndume was transferred back to the Cincinnati Zoo following a months-long court battle. The Gorilla Foundation said, "We are deeply saddened that our beloved Ndume is leaving and wish the very best for his happiness, good health and peace of mind."

=== Cincinnati Zoo ===
Ndume arrived at the Cincinnati Zoo in the morning of June 14, 2019, after being flown in from the Gorilla Foundation. The move went "perfectly smooth" and he "slept most of the way," according to the Cincinnati Zoo's Curator of Primates, Ron Evans. Ndume was not tranquilized when being moved, but was given food and water along the way.

Upon arrival, Ndume was given his own bedroom suite or "play land" that was in close proximity to the zoo’s two gorilla troops.

The zoo created a third family group with Ndume. The zoo introduced Ndume to other gorillas at his pace and he determined which female gorillas were the best fit for him. Once Ndume was acclimated to the zoo environment, he was put on exhibit and introduced to zoo guests. He has been introduced to a troop with two female gorillas, Chewie and Mara.

== Center of lawsuit ==
After Koko died, the Cincinnati Zoo along with the AZA contacted the Gorilla Foundation and requested that Ndume be transferred back to the Cincinnati Zoo. However, the Gorilla Foundation and Penny Patterson said "...There is a significant probability that proceeding down the path proposed by the American Zoo Association may kill Ndume — either during transfer, or within weeks or months thereafter." In response, the Cincinnati Zoo stated that since 2007 there have been 150 gorilla transfers that have resulted in no problems or transfer-related deaths. The Cincinnati Zoo has also said that gorillas as old as 45 have been successfully transferred and have lived to be over 50 years old.

The Cincinnati Zoo also accused the Gorilla Foundation of risking Ndume's mental health by refusing to give him up because he has had no contact with other gorillas since Koko's passing. Ron Evans, the Curator of Primates at the Cincinnati Zoo, said, "Having gorillas around other gorillas is a foundation need for gorillas." The foundation defended keeping Ndume in isolation, claiming, "He is with a strong family support group of human great apes, from whom he takes great comfort." The Gorilla Foundation also stated that "[when Ndume] overheard a discussion about his possible transfer to the zoo,” he reacted by "crying, screaming, banging and shoving objects for 14 hours."

On October 25, 2018, the Cincinnati Zoo filed a federal lawsuit against the Gorilla Foundation on the grounds that they failed to comply with the loan agreement that was mutually agreed-upon and updated in 2015. The agreement stated, "Upon the death of Koko, Ndume will be placed at an AZA institution recommended by the Gorilla Species Survival Plan and the Cincinnati Zoo & Botanical Garden."

During the case, PETA filed an amicus brief in support of the Cincinnati Zoo's lawsuit.

On February 1, 2019, Judge Richard Seeborg announced that Ndume will be transferred back to the Cincinnati Zoo. Seeborg wrote, "There is no legal basis to negate that agreement now. Given that both sides represent that the well-being of Ndume is their paramount interest, however, they are expected to cooperate now to ensure the conditions under which he is transported to the Zoo and begins living there are as optimal as can reasonably be achieved."

It was announced that Ndume would be sent back to the Cincinnati Zoo from the Gorilla Foundation on May 13. Before being transferred, Ndume began to go through crate training.

Ndume was scheduled to be transferred to the Cincinnati Zoo on May 13 and later June 4, but both transfer dates were delayed. On June 4, the Cincinnati Zoo filed a joint status update asking Judge Richard Seeborg to set Ndume's transfer date for June 12. The Gorilla Foundation notified the Cincinnati Zoo that they would not allow Ndume's transfer on June 4 because of a doctor finding Balantidium coli (B. coli) in Ndume's fecal matter. An attorney for the Gorilla Foundation suggested that Ndume was suffering from "...extreme stress [after] hearing the transfer crate being closed..." and transferring Ndume "could prove fatal." However, the Cincinnati Zoo disagreed with the Gorilla Foundation stating they "are not concerned that the presence of this trace amount of the non-active form of the protozoal organism poses a health risk to Ndume or should prevent his transfer."

Ndume was successfully transferred back to the Cincinnati Zoo on June 14 after being flown into Cincinnati. Following Ndume's arrival back to the zoo, PETA said in a statement "After years of pressure from PETA, Ndume is now back where he was born, in a place where he’s supported by expert care and has a chance to socialize with other gorillas." The Cincinnati Zoo introduced Ndume to female gorillas and they formed a troop.

== See also ==
- List of individual apes
