= C. H. Patterson =

American psychologist (1912–2006)

- Born: Cecil Holden Patterson; June 22, 1912; Lynn, Massachusetts
- Died: May 26, 2006 (aged 93)
- Citizenship: United States
- Education: University of Chicago (B.A.), University of Minnesota, (Ph.D.)
- Spouse: Frances Spano

Cecil Holden Patterson (1912–2006) was an American psychologist and writer. He was an emeritus professor of psychology at the University of Illinois at Urbana-Champaign in the United States. He worked directly with Carl Rogers and practiced person-centered (Rogerian) therapy throughout his career.

Patterson was born June 22, 1912, in Lynn, Massachusetts. He originally planned to study for Christian ministry, but moved into sociology, receiving his bachelor's degree from the University of Chicago in 1938, and his Ph.D. in psychology from the University of Minnesota in 1955. He served in the army during World War II.

In 1942, he married Frances Spano, a nutritionist whom he met at Fels Research Institute in Yellow Springs, Ohio. Cecil and Frances worked together to publish his first article in 1941.

In 1956, Patterson joined the faculty of the University of Illinois at Urbana-Champaign, and worked there for 19 years.

Patterson was president of the APA Division 17 in the 1970s and received the Division 17 Leona Tyler Award in 1994.

He was the author of many publications in the fields of educational psychology and counseling and continued publishing until the age of 91.

Patterson's publications used in counselor education include Theories of Counseling and Psychotherapy and The Therapeutic Relationship: Foundations for an Eclectic Psychotherapy.

He died May 26, 2006.

== Family ==
Cecil and Frances had seven children. His second-eldest child is Francine Patterson, a researcher who taught a modified form of American Sign Language to a gorilla named Koko.
