= The Gorilla Foundation =

US non-profit organization

The Gorilla Foundation is a non-profit organization founded in 1976 by Francine Patterson and Ronald Cohn with Barbara F. Hiller.

It was created in order to purchase a female western lowland gorilla named Koko from the San Francisco Zoo. Patterson had been attempting to teach Koko American Sign Language since 1972, under custody of the zoo. In 1974, Patterson moved the project from a trailer at the zoo to a new compound at Stanford University, yet there was a possibility that Koko would need to be returned to the zoo, so Patterson raised money to buy and keep her. After the purchase, the foundation continued to support Patterson's research as she worked with Koko, in order to research language acquisition by non-human animals.

Besides Koko, the foundation also kept two male gorillas: Michael from 1976 until his death in 2000, and Ndume from 1991 until his return to the Cincinnati Zoo in 2019. Koko died in 2018, and after her death followed by the transfer of Ndume, the foundation no longer had any gorillas on which to conduct research.

== Beginning ==
Patterson had worked with Koko since 1972, when she began teaching the then 1-year-old gorilla American Sign Language (ASL). Patterson planned to continue her scientific experiment designed to determine whether, if it were raised using sign language, a gorilla would learn to use language.

Patterson fed and cared for Koko as she would her own child, and the pair formed a mother/child emotional bond. Koko was first moved from the San Francisco Children's Zoo to a private trailer on the zoo in 1973, and then moved to a campus at Stanford University in 1974. After purchasing Koko, the foundation moved her into a trailer near Patterson's home in Woodside, California. In 1976, The Gorilla Foundation acquired Michael, a gorilla born in Cameroon who was allegedly orphaned after his parents were killed for meat, as a potential language-using mate for Koko.

== Activities ==
Patterson and her assistants used simultaneous spoken English and ASL when speaking with the gorillas. Patterson has published several papers claiming that Koko has developed a vocabulary of 1000 to 2000 words. The claims that Koko has invented compound words, and uttered meaningful sentences have been widely rejected and face significant methodological criticisms. Under Patterson's criterion for acquisition of a language term, which must be "recorded by two independent observers and be used spontaneously and appropriately on at least half the days of a given month", Koko had learned 264 signs in the first five and a half years of training.

Beginning in the 1990s, the Foundation tried to raise money to move their operation from its sole location in Woodside, California, to a new ape preserve in Maui. They hoped that Koko would successfully mate with her partner, Ndume, who had arrived in 1991, and spontaneously teach their offspring to use sign language. Land was leased in Maui in 1993, but in 2010 The Gorilla Foundation decided that the lease was not secure enough to start work, and decided to focus on the Woodside site instead.

In 2018 Koko died, activating a section of Ndume's loan agreement with the Cincinnati Zoo, which said that Ndume would be placed in an "Association of Zoos and Aquariums" institution after Koko's death. Patterson tried to prevent the move, citing concerns about Ndume's health, which led to a lawsuit resulting in Ndume's removal in June 2019.

According to the Foundation's website, Patterson and other employees have partnered with conservation organizations including International Fund for Animal Welfare and Pan African Conservation Education. The Gorilla Foundation has attempted education projects to decrease the consumption of bushmeat.

== Criticism ==
During a question-and-answer period, in response to a question as to whether her findings would ever be scientifically proven by duplicating them in an independent experiment, Patterson stated that she believes it would not be ethical to do it again because she believes that it is not right to keep such animals in such unnatural circumstances.

Patterson was accused of sexual discrimination in 2005 by reportedly expecting female volunteers to show their breasts to Koko. This led to a lawsuit, during which said volunteers were fired.

The notion the gorillas actually learned language is widely rejected by linguists and other experts. A common criticism is that most of the signs they used were used chaotically in order to meet a goal, without regard for sentence structure, making them not true language. However, the differences between sign languages and spoken languages have been used to help understand the gorillas' language acquisition, and Koko has erroneously been described as using language in advanced ways, such as symbolic descriptions, lying, and making jokes.

=== Care practices ===
Former employees of The Gorilla Foundation criticized the methods used to care for Koko and her male companion Ndume. In 2012, nine staff members including caregivers and researchers out of "roughly a dozen" resigned, and several submitted a letter to the board to explain their concerns. Former caregiver John Safkow stated that all members of the board left after the walkout, except for Betty White. A pseudonymous source, "Sarah," told Slate that Koko's diet included an excess of processed meat and candy, and that Koko was given a traditional Thanksgiving dinner yearly. The source stated that the official diet they were told to give Koko was appropriate, but that Patterson would visit and feed her "chocolates and meats." Koko's weight of 270 pounds (122 kg) was higher than would be normal for a female gorilla in the wild, approximately 150–200 pounds (70–90 kg); the foundation stated that Koko "is, like her mother, a larger frame Gorilla." Multiple employees corroborated the claim that both Koko and Ndume were given "massive" numbers of supplements on the recommendation of a naturopath; Safkow recalled that the number was between 70 and 100 pills per day, and "Sarah" claimed that various inappropriate foods like smoked turkey, pea soup, non-alcoholic beer, and candy were used as treats to coax Koko to take the pills. The Gorilla Foundation stated that Koko took "between 5 to 15 types of nutritional supplements" and acknowledged their use of homeopathic remedies.

Several former caregivers at The Gorilla Foundation also raised concerns that Koko's companion Ndume was being neglected. In 2012, a group of former employees reached out to a blogger who focused on the ape caregiver community, who in turn asked the USDA Animal and Plant Health Inspection Service (APHIS) to follow up on the claims. After an investigation, APHIS reported that Ndume had been neglected in some aspects; for instance, he had not been Tuberculosis tested in 20 years, despite the recommendation being to test gorillas for Tuberculosis yearly.

== See also ==
- Gorilla
- Great ape language
- Koko (gorilla)
- Michael (gorilla)
- Ndume
- Koko: A Talking Gorilla (1978 documentary)
