= Michael (gorilla) =

Gorilla who was part of experiments to teach apes language (1973–2000)

- Species: Gorilla
- Sex: Male
- Born: Michael; March 17, 1973; Cameroon
- Died: April 19, 2000 (aged 27); California
- Nationality: Cameroon
- Known for: Being first male gorilla to use American sign language
- Tricks: Painting and ASL
- Owner: Francine Patterson

Michael (March 17, 1973, Cameroon – April 19, 2000) was a male gorilla involved in experiments to teach apes sign language. He is alleged to have had a working vocabulary of over 600 signs in American Sign Language, taught to him by Koko, a female gorilla; Francine Patterson; and other staff of Stanford University. Michael, an orphan, spent most of his life in Woodside, California, where he became known for painting. Both Michael and Koko’s linguistic abilities are widely rejected by specialists, despite popular perception to the contrary.

== Biography ==
Michael's parents were killed while he was still a baby. At the age of three, he was brought to live with Koko at Stanford.

== Death ==
Michael died of heart failure related to cardiomyopathy on April 19, 2000. Koko and her more recent potential mate, Ndume, mourned his death for several months.

Koko died in 2018, and staff have since returned Ndume to the Cincinnati Zoo, where he lives with two female gorilla companions.

== See also ==
- Chantek
- Dian Fossey
- George Schaller
- Great ape language
- Jane Goodall
- Kanzi
- List of individual apes
- Mountain gorilla
- Primate
- Primate use of American Sign Language
- The Mind of an Ape
