= Sarah (chimpanzee) =

Research chimpanzee

Sarah Anne
- Species: chimpanzee
- Sex: female
- Born: August 1959; Africa
- Died: 2019 (aged 59–60)

Sarah (full name Sarah Anne) (August 1959 – July 2019) was an enculturated research chimpanzee whose cognitive skills were documented in the 1983 book The Mind of an Ape, by David Premack and Ann James Premack. Sarah was one of nine chimpanzees in David Premack's psychology laboratory in Pennsylvania. Sarah was born in Africa in 1959. She first worked in Missouri, then in Santa Barbara, and then Pennsylvania. She first was exposed to language token training in 1967.

Sarah, along with three other chimpanzees, were exposed to language token training. One of the chimpanzees failed to learn a single word, but Sarah, Elizabeth, and Peony were able to parse and also produce streams of tokens which obeyed a grammar.

She used a special board with plastic symbols to correctly parse various syntactic expressions including if-then-else. Sarah was even able to recognize colors and connect them with matching objects, a talent that Premack noted, doubting that a pigeon could have.

When the Premacks decided they no longer wanted to work with chimpanzees in 1987, Sarah was sent to Sarah Boysen's Chimp Center at the Ohio State University, where she lived and worked with other enculturated chimpanzees: Kermit, Darrell, Bobby, Sheba, Keeli, Ivy, Harper, and Emma. In January 2006, Sarah attacked a student, causing minor injuries. The following month, the Chimp Center was closed and OSU sent the chimps to a private animal collection in Texas. Subsequently, the chimps were transferred to another chimpanzee sanctuary, Chimp Haven, in Louisiana. At Chimp Haven, Sarah was known for her blanket nesting techniques. Her favorite treat was M&M's.

Sarah died in July 2019, just before her 60th birthday.

== See also ==
- List of individual apes
