= Lyn Miles =

American anthropologist

H. Lynn Miles
- Born: August 5, 1944 (age 81)
- Education: Ph.D. in anthropology, University of Connecticut (1978)
- Occupation: Anthropologist

H. Lyn Miles (born August 5, 1944) is an American bio-cultural anthropologist and animal rights advocate. Miles conducted a 1970s experiment in which a baby orangutan named Chantek was videotaped during sign language acquisition. She was teaching sign language providing a full human experience in the immersive-participant-observation way, the same way human babies are taught during infancy.

== Life ==
Miles was raised by her younger brother and has two other non-biological brothers. In 1978, she earned her PhD in anthropology from the University of Connecticut. Since 1993, she has lived in Atlanta, Georgia in order to be able to visit Chantek after he was transferred to the Yerkes National Primate Research Center and was sharing the responsibility for Chantek with her colleague Ann Southcombe who for seven years kept visiting Chantek.

== Work ==
On the Chattanooga university campus, Miles had equipped a trailer home for Chantek, who had a full human experience during the experiment. She is currently a UC Foundation Professor of Anthropology at the University of Tennessee at Chattanooga, teaching courses that include physical anthropology, ape language, and linguistic anthropology. She is a Fellow of the American Anthropological Association and an Editorial Associate of Behavioral and Brain Sciences.

== Advocacy ==
Miles advocates that no enculturated great apes should be treated as captive experimental animals, but as true "orang utans", which means "persons of the forest", and eventually be declared as legal persons under the law. She is a strong supporter of orangutan conservation.

== Media coverage ==
Miles and her work has been the subject of several documentaries.

- 2014 The Ape Who Went to College, My Wild Affair, Animal Planet
- 2000 They Call Him Chantek, New York Festivals Finalist, Animal Planet
- Signs of the Apes, Songs of the Whales, PBS NOVA

== Selected publications ==
- Parker, S. T., Mitchell, R. W., & Miles, H. L. (Eds.). (1999). The mentality of gorillas and orangutans. Cambridge: Cambridge University Press.
- Miles, H. L. (1997). Anthropomorphism, apes and language. In R. W. Mitchell, N. S. Thompson, & H. L. Miles (Eds.), Anthropomorphism, anecdotes, and animals, pp. 383–404. Albany, NY: State University of New York.
- Miles, H. L. (1994). ME CHANTEK: The development of self-awareness in a signing orangutan. In S. Parker, R. Mitchell, & M. Boccia (Eds.), Self-awareness in monkeys and apes: Developmental Perspectives (pp. 254–272). Cambridge: Cambridge University Press.
- Miles, H. L. (1986). How can I tell a lie? Apes, language and the problem of deception. In R. W. Mitchell, & N. S. Thompson (Eds.), Deception: Perspectives on human and nonhuman deceit (pp. 245–266). Albany, NY: State University of New York Press.
