= Chantek =

Captive orangutan (1977–2017)

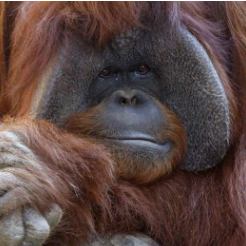
- Chantek orangutan from Atlanta Zoo Site
- Species: Orangutan
- Breed: hybrid Sumatran/Bornean
- Sex: Male
- Born: December 17, 1977; Yerkes National Primate Research Center
- Died: August 7, 2017 (aged 39)
- Cause of death: Heart disease
- Weight: 204 kg (450 lb)

Chantek (December 17, 1977 – August 7, 2017), born at the Yerkes National Primate Research Center in Atlanta, Georgia, was a male hybrid Sumatran/Bornean orangutan who demonstrated a number of intellectual skills, including the use of several signs adapted from American Sign Language (ASL). American anthropologists Lyn Miles and Ann Southcombe worked with Chantek. In 1997, he was transferred to Zoo Atlanta, where he lived for another twenty years.

== Early life ==
Born at the Yerkes National Primate Research Center, Chantek was transferred to the University of Tennessee at Chattanooga (UTC) when he was nine months old. (In Malay and Indonesian, cantik — pronounced chanteek — means "lovely" or "beautiful".) Lyn Miles directed a research project to study apes, and she and a few student volunteers cared for him during the first few months after his arrival. Miles taught him his first signs, "food-eat" and "drink". Shortly afterward, her teaching schedule made it necessary to hire an assistant, Ann Southcombe. Ann had experience raising seven baby gorillas at the Cincinnati Zoo. Ann Southcombe also worked with Michael, who lived with Koko, the first gorilla taught to communicate using signs. Under the direction of Miles, Chantek was raised much as a human child. Ann toilet trained Chantek (as she had with Michael). She gave him chores, such as picking up his toys. In exchange for completing tasks, Chantek was given steel washers as a form of money.

As Miles taught anthropology at UTC, she also gathered a group of dedicated student volunteers to help with the project, such as Warren Roberts, who taught anthropology classes at the college as of Spring 2017.

Chantek spent almost nine years living under constant supervision in a specially adapted trailer on the UTC campus. He attended classes regularly, and his photo was included in the school yearbooks. However, as his size increased, and as containing him in his compound became a problem, the administration feared an accident. He was returned to Yerkes after an alleged incident in which he escaped from his compound and was accused of having caught a female student by surprise. He lived in a small enclosure at Yerkes for the next eleven years, during which his weight reportedly increased due to limited physical activity. When his caretakers were permitted to visit, he continually signed for them to get car keys and take him home.

In 1997, the Zoo Atlanta offered him sanctuary in an enclosure with trees for swinging from branch to branch (brachiation).

== Later years and death ==
In 2013, Animal Planet aired a documentary about Chantek's life and experience. The show, a part of their A Wild Affair series, was titled The Ape That Went to College. His former caretaker Lyn would visit him, and he would still use signs especially when she was present. Although he never had soda, ice cream, cheeseburgers, or candy in 10 years, he asked for them in sign language. On August 7, 2017, Chantek died of heart disease at the age of 39.

Chantek resided at Zoo Atlanta in one of their orangutan enclosures with a small group of other orangutans. He enjoyed painting, stringing beads, and constructing things. He was shy and quiet but attentive and was highly observant of his surroundings.

== Intellect ==
Chantek had a vocabulary of around 150 modified ASL signs, and he also understood spoken English. Chantek made and used tools and even understood the concepts of money and work-exchange. He possessed the spatial comprehension to direct a driving-route from the University of Tennessee at Chattanooga (UTC) to the closest Dairy Queen, and the mental comprehension to refer to events that happened years ago. He was a huge fan of the country basket at Dairy Queen and enjoyed many Dilly bars. He enjoyed creative projects and made paintings, necklaces, and music.

Like children, Chantek preferred to use names rather than pronouns – as the reference is fixed – even when talking to a person. He even invented signs of his own (e.g. 'eye-drink' for contact lens solution, and 'Dave Missing Finger' for a special friend). He developed referential ability as early as most human children, and pointed to objects just like humans do. Chantek used adjectives to specify attributes, such as "orange dogs" when he referred to orangutans unfamiliar to him.

Chantek also demonstrated self-awareness, by grooming himself in a mirror and by using signs in mental planning and deception. Rather than simply exhibiting conditioned responses, as critics of primate intellect contend, Chantek learned roles – and role reversals – in games like 'Simon Says'. Like many other orangutans who have demonstrated problem solving skills, Chantek exhibited certain intuitive and thinking character traits comparable to the rationality used in human engineering. His intellectual and linguistic abilities made some scientists, including Miles and Dawn Prince-Hughes, regard him as possessing personhood.

Miles has said that Chantek asked questions, noting that he once inquired, "What is that?" while pointing at an especially bright moon.

== Orangutan personhood and conservation ==
The term personhood is often ascribed by experts to animals who demonstrate conscious awareness, language, and acculturation. Miles and other researchers advocate for the extension of certain legal rights to great apes, based on observed cognitive abilities.

To accomplish this goal, Miles created Project Chantek, to further study the mind of the orangutan. She hopes her research will help ascertain how human symbolic systems evolved and developed. Uniquely, her project emphasizes development of cultural models and processes in Chantek's upbringing. Her work is supported by the Chantek Foundation, whose mission is to develop greater scientific understanding of orangutans, to support cultural and language research with orangutans, to promote orangutan conservation and establish culture-based great ape sanctuaries, thereby building a bridge of understanding between humans and other great apes.

The Chantek Foundation is a member of ApeNet, founded by musician Peter Gabriel to link great apes through the internet, creating the first interspecies internet communication. The project was cancelled.

== See also ==
- Birutė Galdikas
- Great ape language
- Jeffrey H. Schwartz
- List of individual apes
- Primate cognition
- The Mind of an Ape
- Theory of mind
