= Sarah Boysen =

American psychologist (born 1949)

Sarah Till "Sally" Boysen (born March 5, 1949) is an American psychologist who is a professor of psychology at Ohio State University. She is a primate researcher and former Director of the Chimp Center at the university. She was selected as one of the top 50 women scientists by Discover magazine in 2002.

== Early life ==
Boysen was born on March 5, 1949, in Sandusky, Ohio. She has two younger brothers and two older sisters.

== Research ==
Boysen primarily studies chimpanzees. She established the Comparative Cognition Project at the Ohio State University Chimpanzee Center in 1983. Boysen's research focuses on chimpanzees' cognitive abilities in relation to intelligence, linguistics and neuroscience. Her current research topics include animal cognitive development, social behaviors, cognition, the last of which examines animals' "numerical competence" and ability to count. Boysen has also studied how captive lowland gorillas use tools.

Boysen has been the subject of many documentaries, including ones on the BBC, National Geographic Frontiers, NOVA, and Nature. She has also been featured in numerous Discovery Channel specials centered around her chimpanzee studies.

== Shutdown of Centre ==
In February 2006, her research center was shut down by Ohio State University. The university cited lack of external funds to support the high costs of maintaining the center. The chimpanzees in the center were relocated to Primates, Inc. in San Antonio, Texas. Boysen filed a restraining order in February 2006 to stop the chimps from being moved to Texas, but it was denied. Boysen claimed that Primates, Inc. did not provide proper care for the chimpanzees, and she wanted them to be sent to Chimp Haven in Keithville, Louisiana instead. After the relocation, two of the chimpanzees died.

In response to the chimpanzees dying, she filed a federal lawsuit against the university, which was unsuccessful. However, the remaining chimpanzees were relocated to Chimp Haven after the initial deaths.

== See also ==
- Sarah (chimpanzee)
