= Ronald Cohn =

American zoologist (1943–2022)

Ron Cohn
- Born: 1943
- Died: September 16, 2022 (aged 78–79); Redwood City, California, U.S.
- Citizenship: United States
- Education: University of Illinois at Urbana-Champaign (B.A., M.A., Ph.D.)
- Scientific career
- Workplaces: Co-founder of The Gorilla Foundation

Ronald Herbert Cohn (1943 – September 16, 2022) was an American zoologist who was a long-time research collaborator of psychologist Francine Patterson in her work in training Koko the gorilla in the use of American sign language. He documented much of Koko's life on film and on camera, and is credited as the illustrator for the children's books Koko's Kitten, Koko-Love!: Conversations With a Signing Gorilla, and Koko's Story. One of his photos of Koko was featured on the cover of National Geographic in 1978 and 1985.

At the University of Illinois at Urbana-Champaign, he received his bachelor's degree in 1965, his master's degree in zoology in 1967, and his Ph.D. in biology in 1971.

After receiving his PhD, Cohn worked as a cell biologist at the Stanford Departments of Medicine and Pediatrics. He did research in genetic engineering and membrane structure. He is credited with discovering that adult cells make hyaluronic acid from glucosamine, which led the way to glucosamine being used to treat arthritis.

Cohn co-founded The Gorilla Foundation with Patterson and Barbara F Hiller in 1971.

Cohn died at his home in Redwood City, California, on September 16, 2022.
