= Koko: A Talking Gorilla =

- DVD cover art
- Directed by: Barbet Schroeder
- Produced by: Margaret Ménégoz
- Starring: Koko; Francine Patterson
- Cinematography: Néstor Almendros
- Edited by: Denise De Casabianca; Dominique Auvray
- Distributed by: Les Films du Losange; The Criterion Collection
- Release date: October 1978
- Running time: 80 minutes
- Country: France
- Languages: English; French

Koko: A Talking Gorilla (French: Koko, le gorille qui parle) is a 1978 French documentary film directed by Barbet Schroeder that focuses on Francine Patterson and her work with Koko the gorilla. Patterson claims to have taught Koko to communicate with humans using symbols taken from American Sign Language. The film was screened in the Un Certain Regard section at the 1978 Cannes Film Festival.

== Synopsis ==
The film introduces Koko soon after she was brought from the San Francisco Zoo to Stanford University by Francine Patterson for a controversial experiment. She would be taught American Sign Language. Director Schroeder dove into the widely discussed debate about animal rights, and whether they should be treated as individuals.

== Reception ==
Janet Maslin of The New York Times called the film "handsomely photographed", and wrote: "Koko does present some fascinating insights into matters of behavior and education. And Mr. Schroeder has assembled this funny, provocative documentary with gratifying intelligence and care."

== Release ==
New Yorker Films released the film in the United States.

Koko: A Talking Gorilla was released on VHS. In 2010, the film was released on DVD by the Criterion Collection.
