= Kanzi =

Bonobo research subject (1980–2025)

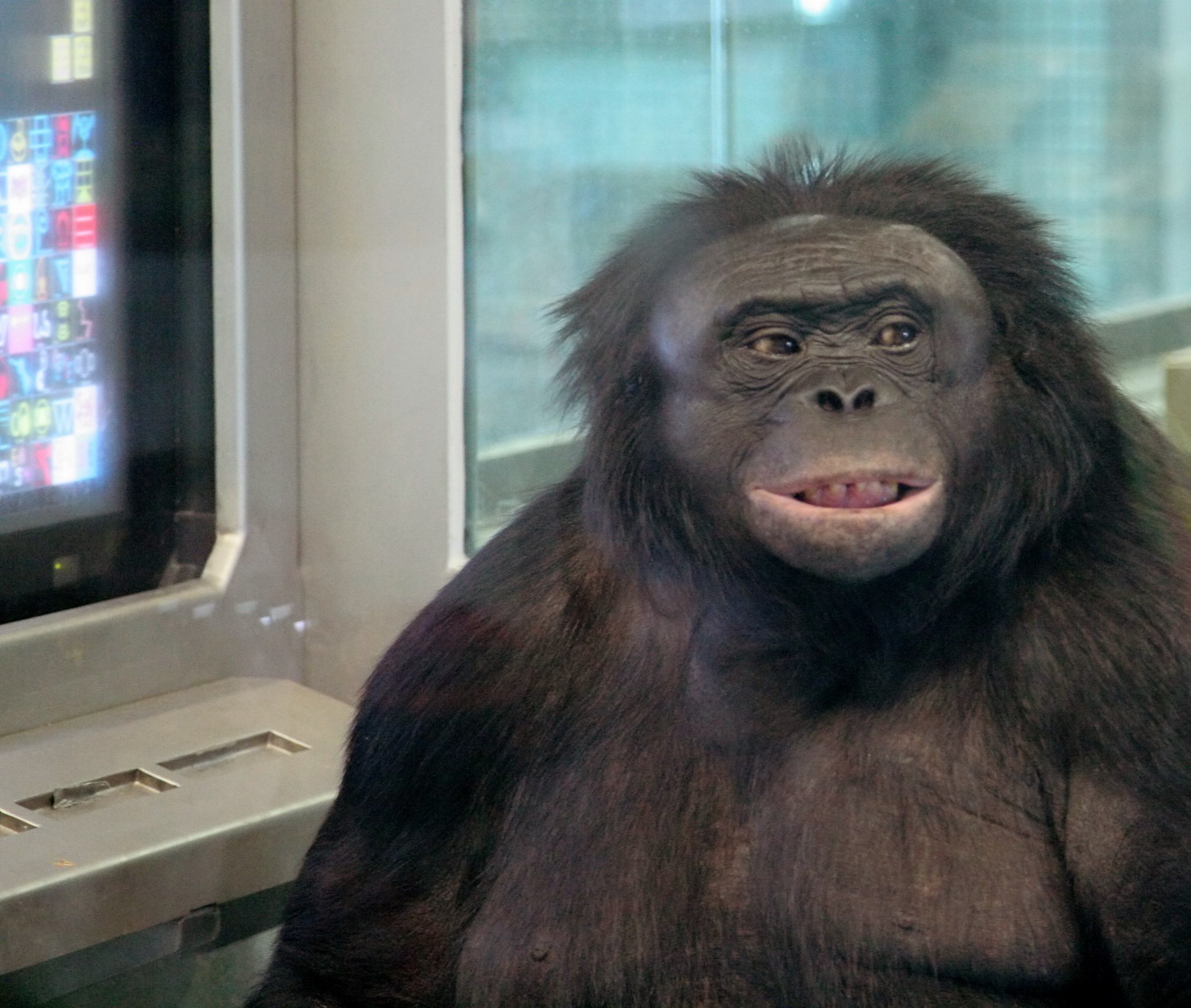
- Kanzi near his lexigram in 2006
- Species: Bonobo (Pan paniscus)
- Sex: Male
- Born: October 28, 1980; Atlanta, Georgia, U.S.
- Died: March 18, 2025 (aged 44); Des Moines, Iowa, U.S.
- Known for: Intelligent use of lexigram

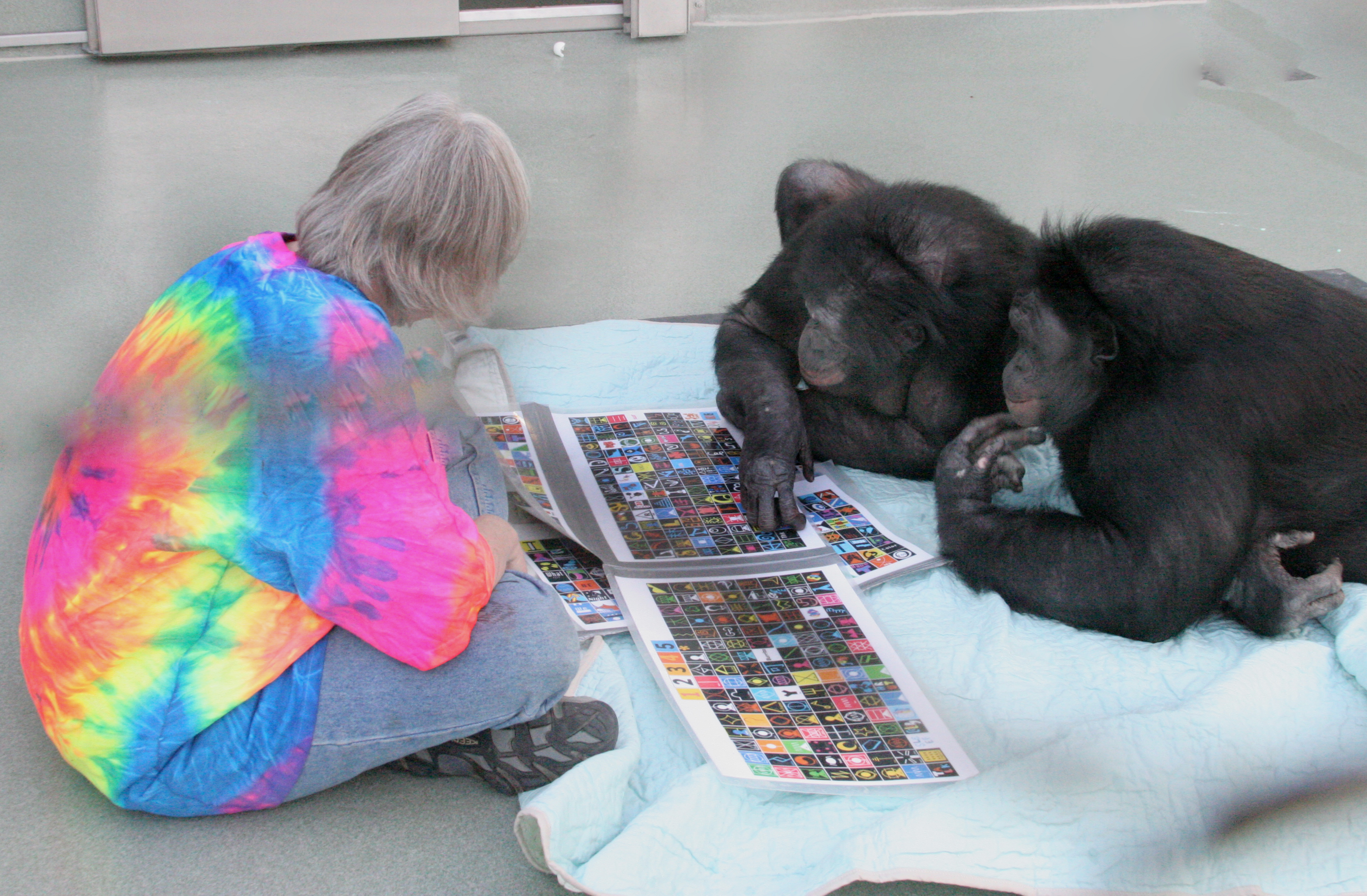
Savage-Rumbaugh (L), Kanzi (R), and his sister Panbanisha (C) working at the portable "keyboard"

Kanzi (October 28, 1980 – March 18, 2025) (Note: also known by the lexigram) was a male bonobo who was the subject of numerous studies on great ape language and cognition.

Kanzi was notable for his cognitive ability and apparent capacity to understand and manipulate language. He is believed to have been the first non-human great ape to comprehend spoken English. He was also the subject of research into his understanding and usage of symbols to communicate, usually through lexigrams and partial ASL. The information that researchers gathered from Kanzi made a significant impact on the fields of linguistics and cognitive science. Kanzi's behavior and abilities have been the topic of research published in scientific journals, as well as reports in popular media. He died in 2025 in Des Moines, Iowa.

== Biography ==
Kanzi was born in captivity on October 28, 1980, in Atlanta, Georgia, to Lorel and Bosandjo at Yerkes Field Station at Emory University in 1980. Lorel was later moved to the Jacksonville Zoo in Florida, while Bosandjo still currently resides at Yerkes. Within hours of Kanzi's birth, he was adopted by his adoptive mother Matata, a wild-born bonobo who originated from Zaire.

In 1985, Kanzi and his sister Panbanisha moved to the Language Research Center at Georgia State University. They were later relocated to the Great Ape Trust, in Des Moines, Iowa. The controversial facility, which had been embattled with serious allegations of neglect, was closed after the death of Panbanisha in 2012. In 2013, the Ape Cognition and Conservation Initiative (ACCI), under the direction of Jared Taglialatela, a professor at Kennesaw State University in Georgia, and Bill Hopkins, a professor at Georgia State University, took over the facility.

When the ACCI took over Kanzi's care in 2013, he was severely obese due to mismanagement of his diet and activity. His new caretakers changed Kanzi's diet to a more species-appropriate one and increased his opportunities for physical activity. Kanzi subsequently lost over seventy-five pounds.

Kanzi's adoptive mother, Matata, was believed to be in her mid-to-late 40s when she died in June 2014. In the matriarchal society of bonobos, a male's position is primarily determined by the position of the females he is related to. Matata was the group's chief leader so his status as the highest ranking male was established among the group by being adopted as her "son". According to Smithsonian magazine, Kanzi "has the mien of an aging patriarch – he's balding and paunchy with serious, deep-set eyes." This description is confirmed by a full-page color photograph of Kanzi in the March 2008 National Geographic, and a full-page black-and-white photograph in Time magazine.

Kanzi died on March 18, 2025, at the age of 44. His death was announced the following day, on March 19, by the ACCI, the organization which took care of Kanzi as he lived in Des Moines. ACCI staff stated that Kanzi's death was unexpected, and he had not shown any signs of illness on the day prior to his death. According to the staff, Kanzi spent his last day alive eating breakfast, playing with his great-nephew Teco, and engaging in a grooming session with other bonobos before his death. Although necropsy results are pending, the ACCI stated that his death is most likely due to heart disease, which he was previously being treated for.

== Examples of behavior and abilities ==
=== Research programs ===
When he was eight years old, Kanzi was a subject of a research program in which his ability to respond to spoken requests was compared with that of a two-year-old human child called Alia. The study took nine months to complete. Kanzi and Alia were given 660 spoken instructions, asking them to deal with familiar objects in novel ways. Kanzi responded correctly to 74 percent of the instructions, Alia to 65 percent.

A study designed and carried out by archaeologists Kathy Schick and Nicholas Toth aimed to compare Kanzi's cognitive and mechanical abilities with those of early human ancestors who made and used Early Stone Age tools, such as Oldowan stone flakes and cores (a core is the rock from which a flake has been removed). In this study, Schick and Toth showed Kanzi how to flake stone, producing a sharp edge that could be used to cut through a rope in order to gain access to a food reward. After modeling the flaking behavior on a variety of occasions, the researchers set up each experiment by placing a food reward inside a box with a transparent lid which was held closed by a length of rope. Kanzi would then be led into an enclosure where the box was located and provided with the stones needed for flaking, either chert or flint. Over the course of this multi-year study, Kanzi not only learned how to flake, he also developed his own method by throwing the cobbles onto hard surfaces to make a flake, as opposed to the hand-held percussion method that was modeled for him. With the many sharp flakes he produced, Kanzi was able to cut through the rope to gain access to the food reward. However, the flakes he produced and used were more crude than those produced by Early Stone Age humans.

A similar study on the flaking abilities of chimpanzees failed to recreate the findings with Kanzi. The authors suggest that the discrepancies in findings are due to the differences in training of the subjects. When Kanzi was given a human demonstration on how to complete the task, another study which was done on chimpanzees did not use human demonstrations. Instead, the chimpanzees were simply given the items. The human demonstration that was provided for Kanzi, but not the chimpanzees, may explain why Kanzi was able to develop flaking after observing humans, and the chimpanzees in the recent study were not.

In a study by Johns Hopkins University's Social and Cognitive Origins researchers published in February 2025 in Proceedings of the National Academy of Sciences, the research group worked with three male bonobos: 43 year old Kanzi, 25 year old Nyota, and 13 year old Teco. In this study, the bonobos were placed next to each other, while the researchers presented several cups, and placed treats such as grapes or Cheerios underneath one of them. When the researcher interacting with the bonobo (Kanzi or one of the other two) asked "Where's the grape?" while clearly knowing where the grape was, the bonobo "would usually sit still and wait for the treat" during the 10-second wait after the question. But in a scenario where it was obvious that the researcher did not know the whereabouts of the treat, the ape would quickly point to the right cup. Johns Hopkins assistant professor Chris Krupenye noted "The results also suggest apes can simultaneously hold two conflicting world views in their mind. They know exactly where the food is, and at the same time, they know that their partner's view of the same situation is missing that information" and that "this so-called theory of mind supports many of the capacities" behind advanced human capabilities and social organization and "demonstrates the rich mental foundations that humans and other apes share".

=== Language ===
As an infant, Kanzi accompanied Matata to sessions where Matata was taught language through keyboard lexigrams, but showed little interest in the lessons. It was a great surprise to researchers then when one day, while Matata was away, Kanzi began competently using the lexigrams, becoming not only the first observed ape to have learned aspects of language naturalistically rather than through direct training, but also the first observed bonobo to appear to use some elements of language at all. Later, Kanzi was given two of his own lexigrams as he grew up. One of them was outdoors and one of them was indoors. These keyboards had over 300 symbols, and once a symbol on the keyboard was pressed, a computer synthesizer attached to the keyboard would speak the word. Within a short time, Kanzi had mastered the ten words that researchers had been struggling to teach his adoptive mother, and eventually learned a further 348, which he could also combine for new meaning. When he heard a spoken word (through headphones, to filter out nonverbal clues), he pointed to the correct lexigram. He was able to initiate communication using the lexigrams. Sue Savage-Rumbaugh, in 2006, claimed Kanzi understood about 3,000 spoken words. Kanzi knew how to combine symbols in order to account for words or phrases that don't have a symbol on his lexigram. For example, in one instance he wanted to watch his favorite movie, Quest for Fire, so he pressed the symbols for "fire" and "TV".

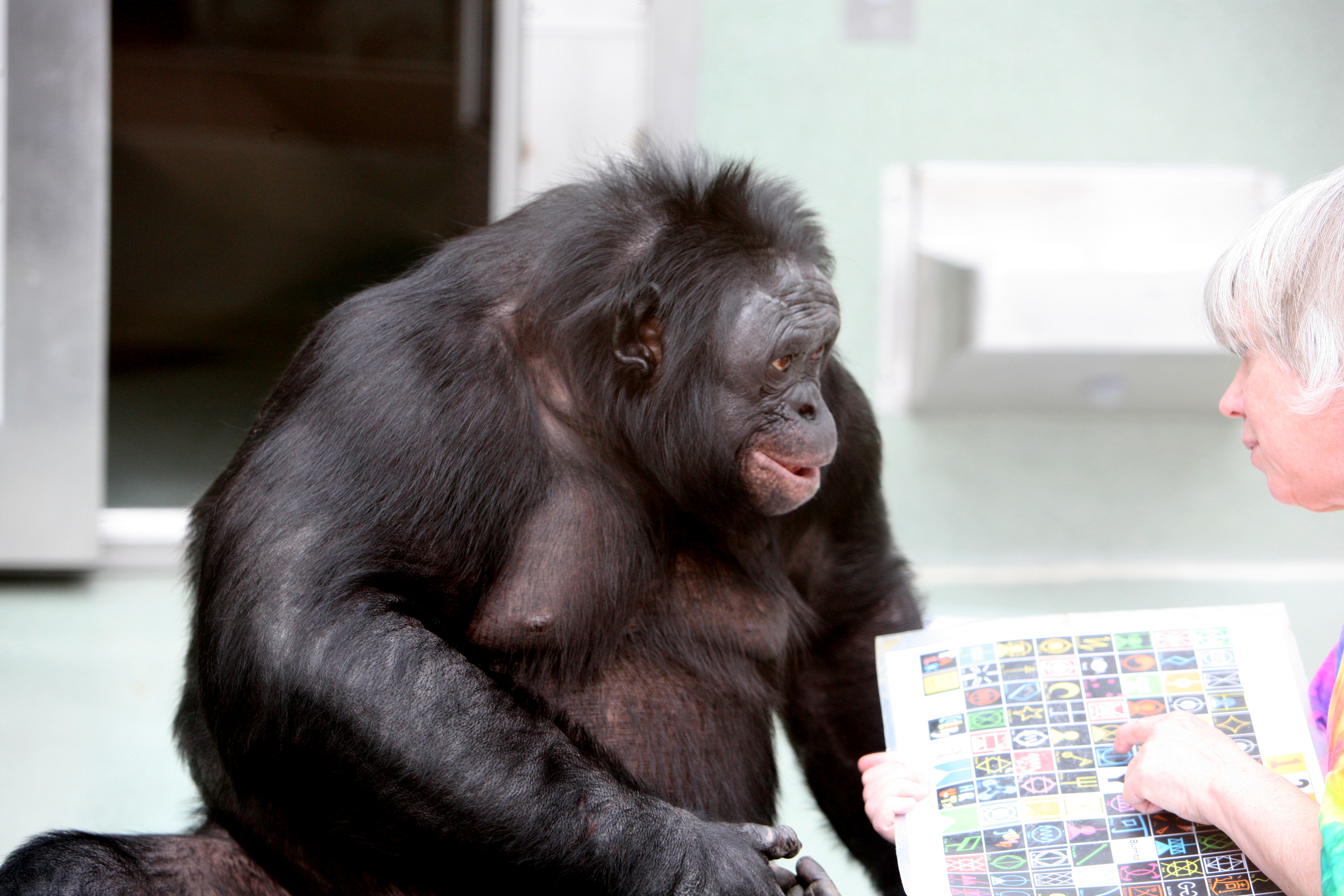
Kanzi converses with Sue Savage-Rumbaugh in 2006 using a portable "keyboard" of arbitrary symbols that Kanzi associates with words.

Kanzi also picked up signs from American Sign Language from watching videos of Koko the gorilla, who communicated using signs to her keeper Penny Patterson; Savage-Rumbaugh did not realize Kanzi could sign until he signed, "You, Gorilla, Question", to anthropologist Dawn Prince-Hughes, who had previously worked closely with gorillas. Based on trials performed at Yerkes Primate Research Center, Kanzi was able to identify symbols correctly 89–95% of the time. Kanzi could not vocalize in a manner that is comprehensible to most humans, as bonobos' vocal tracts are different from the vocal tracts of humans, making them incapable of reproducing most of the vocal sounds humans can make. Humans have vocal cords and larynx muscles that can be freely moved around, but apes such as bonobos do not share this trait. Nonetheless, it was noticed that every time Kanzi communicated with humans with specially designed graphic symbols such as the lexigram, he often paired his own vocalization with it as well. Furthermore, it was noticed that these vocalizations had mostly been matched by when a caregiver or researcher was interacting with him. Researchers including Savage-Rumbaugh, along with Jared Taglialatela and Lauren Baker, suggest that Kanzi may have been controlling his vocalizations depending on the phrases that he heard from humans he interacted with. Later, it was discovered that Kanzi was producing the articulatory equivalent of the symbols he was indicating, although in a very high pitch and with distortions.

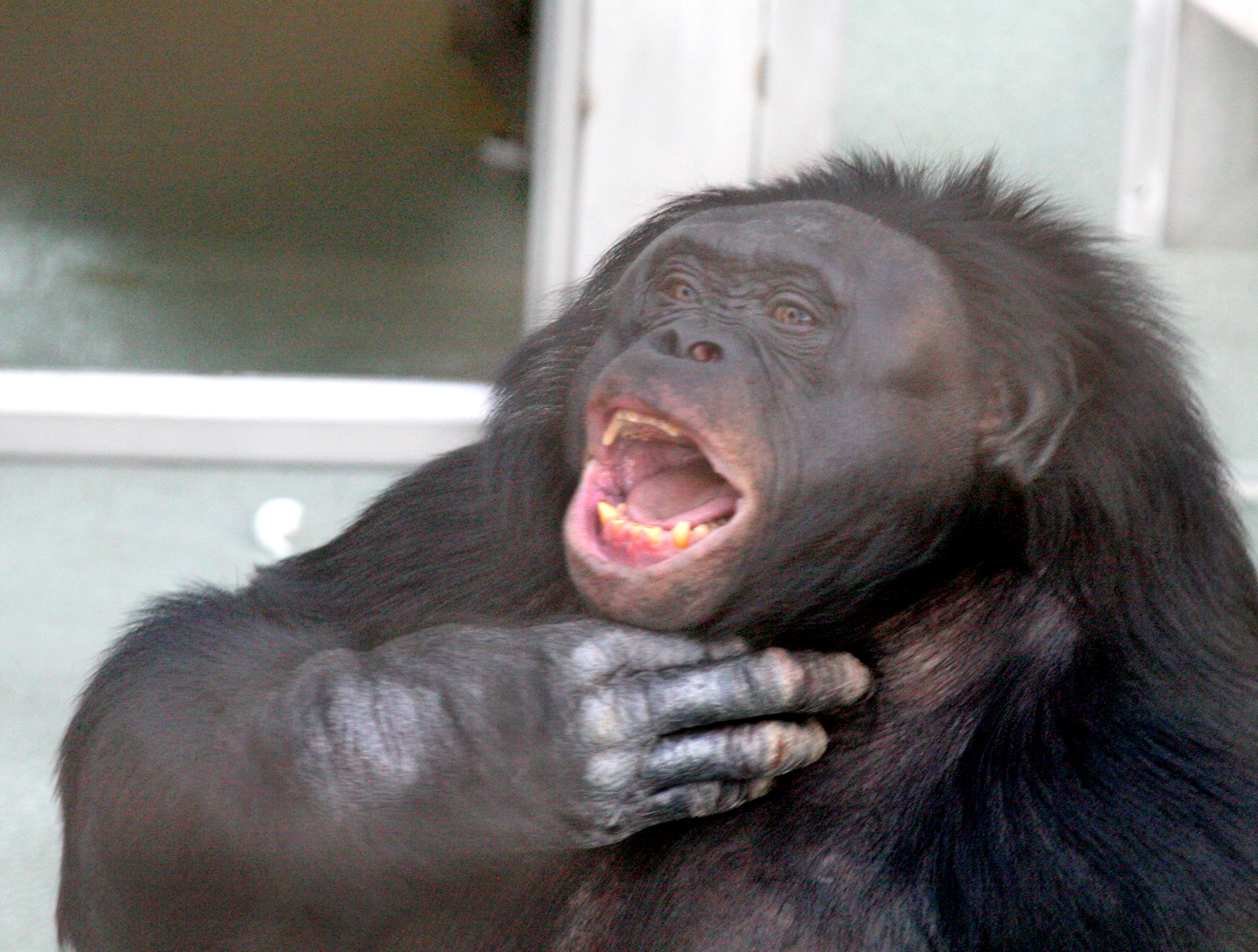
Kanzi during a species-standard vocalization.

According to the research of Savage-Rumbaugh, Kanzi "can understand individual spoken words and how they are used in novel sentences". For example, the researcher asked Kanzi to go get the carrot in the microwave, Kanzi went directly to the microwave and completely ignored the carrot that was closer to him, but not in the microwave. In another example, a researcher gave the task, "feed your ball some tomato". Alia, a human 2-year-old, did not know what to do, but Kanzi immediately used a spongy toy Halloween pumpkin as a ball and began to feed the toy.

Although Kanzi is considered to be the best case for apes acquiring language-like capabilities, his utterances were not equivalent to that of a 3-year-old child. Kanzi's utterances still rely heavily on human interpretation, a common criticism of great ape language experiments. For example, when Kanzi used "strawberry", it would be interpreted as a request to go to where the strawberries grow, a request to eat some, used as a name, and so on dependent on the handler's interpretation and context.

Kanzi also showed no ability in the use of function words, nor could he make use of morphology, such as indicating the plural form of a noun, or syntax. As with other great ape language experiments, Kanzi was not considered by some linguists to display a capacity for language.

=== Anecdotes ===
Author Chris Herzfeld recognized Kanzi for his ability to "evoke absent objects, invent new formulas to describe elements whose names he did not know. He had a certain notion of time and seemed to understand another's point of view." [sic] The following are examples of these abilities.

In an outing in the woods in Georgia, Kanzi touched the symbols for "marshmallows" and "fire". Susan Savage-Rumbaugh said in an interview that, "Given matches and marshmallows, Kanzi snapped twigs for a fire, lit them with the matches and toasted the marshmallows on a stick." The Daily Telegraph published photographs of Kanzi putting together a fire for food.

Paul Raffaele, at Savage-Rumbaugh's request, performed a haka for the bonobos. This Māori war dance includes thigh-slapping, chest-thumping, and shouting. Almost all the bonobos present interpreted this as an aggressive display, and reacted with loud screams, tooth-baring, and pounding the walls and the floor. Kanzi, who remained calm, communicated with Savage-Rumbaugh using bonobo vocalizations; Savage-Rumbaugh interpreted these vocalizations, and said to Raffaele, "he'd like you to do it again just for him, in a room out back, so the others won't get upset." Later, a private performance in another room was carried out.

Savage-Rumbaugh has observed Kanzi in communication to his sister. In this experiment, Kanzi was kept in a separate room of the Great Ape Project and shown some yogurt. Kanzi made some vocalizations that his sister could hear; his sister, Panbanisha, who could not see the yogurt, then pointed to the lexigram for yogurt, suggesting those vocalizations may have meaning.

On July 22, 2023, a video uploaded to YouTube by the user ChrisDaCow showed Kanzi playing a modified version of Minecraft. The video earned over 3 million views in 10 days and raised nearly $10,000 for The Ape Initiative as of August 2, 2023. On January 12, 2024, a sequel was published which featured him and another bonobo, his great-nephew Teco, defeating the game's final boss.

== Legacy ==
Kanzi is believed to be the first non-human great ape to comprehend spoken English. The research into Kanzi's cognitive abilities has allowed researchers to determine more similarities between humans and nonhuman great apes. Comparative psychologist Heidi Lyn, of the University of South Alabama, stated that the research gathered by his intelligence caused scientists to re-evaluate the difference between humans and Simian primates. Lyn also stated that Kanzi showed how simians had a semi-capacity for language.

After Kanzi's death, more than 150 people attended an event in Des Moines, Iowa honoring his life and legacy. Iowa Public Radio host Charity Nebbe stated that he was an "ambassador for his species".

== See also ==
- Ape language
- Evolution of language
- Human Ape, a National Geographic documentary film
- List of individual apes
- Primate archaeology
- Yerkish
