= Yerkish =

Artificial language for non-human primates

- Lexigram
- The Yerkish lexigram for "juice"
- Created by: Ernst von Glasersfeld
- Setting and usage: Use a keyboard to punch keys with logograms
- Users: 4 (apes)
- Purpose: Constructed language: Animal language; Yerkish

Language codes
- ISO 639-3: None (mis)
- Glottolog: None
- IETF: art-x-yerkish

Yerkish is an artificial language developed for use by non-human primates. It employs a keyboard whose keys contain lexigrams, symbols corresponding to objects or ideas.

Lexigrams were notably used by the Georgia State University Language Research Center to communicate with bonobos and chimpanzees. Researchers and primates were able to communicate using lexigram boards made in up to three panels with a total of 384 keys.

== Context ==
The Yerkish language was developed by Ernst von Glasersfeld and used by Duane Rumbaugh and Sue Savage-Rumbaugh of Georgia State University while working with primates at the Yerkes National Primate Research Center of Emory University in Atlanta, Georgia. Primates were taught to communicate by means of a lexigram board, a computerized array of keys labeled with lexigrams. Von Glasersfeld coined the term "lexigram" in 1971, created the first 120 of them, and designed the grammar that regulated their combination. This artificial language was called Yerkish in honor of Robert M. Yerkes, the founder of the laboratory within which the lexigrams were first used.

The first ape trained to communicate in Yerkish was the chimpanzee Lana, beginning in 1973 within the context of the LANA project. Researchers were hoping Lana would not only interpret the Yerkish language, but would also participate in communication with others through this newfound language.

== Design considerations ==
=== Lexigram concept ===
Lexigrams representing bonobo Kanzi; bonobo Nyota; human researcher Sue Savage-Rumbaugh

Research leading to 1973 suggested chimpanzees could acquire and retain symbolic use of visual items. In an attempt to structure the use of symbols as language, Yerkish formalized the use of the lexigram, a graphic design which represents a word but is not necessarily indicative of the object to which it refers.

Each lexigram is designed to be semantically and syntactically unequivocal, a conscious effort to reduce the ambiguity of English. For example, the use of color conveys semantic code, with red lexigrams identifying ingestible items like food and drink, blue lexigrams designating activities, and violet lexigrams representing animate beings like humans.

Existing technical limitations guided lexigrams to be constructed by 9 single elements which could be combined by being superimposed. The lexigram for "juice", which is red in color, is a combination of elements 1 (a vertical line), 5 (a circle), and 9 (a wavy line).

Von Glaserfeld created approximately 150 of the first lexigrams in the Yerkish language.

== Interface ==
=== Keyboard ===
A lexigram keyboard was created for Lana with each key representing various nouns or verbs such as food, eat, apple, drink, etc.

Von Glaserfeld used 25 of them in his initial experiment with Lana. Each of these keys was 1 1/2 x 1 inch and lit up when pressed.

After a certain key was pressed, the corresponding item would emerge from a food dispenser placed next to the keyboard, and through a series of experiments, researchers hoped that Lana would learn to interpret what each key would correlate to and learn to meaningfully communicate her requests.

== See also ==
- Primate cognition
- Kanzi
- Panbanisha
- Nyota (bonobo)
- Lana (chimpanzee)
- Great Ape Trust
- Great ape language
