= Francine Patterson =

American researcher (born 1947)

Penny Patterson
- Born: Francine Patterson; February 13, 1947 (age 79); Chicago, Illinois
- Citizenship: United States
- Education: University of Illinois at Urbana-Champaign (B.A., 1970); Stanford University (Ph.D., 1979)
- Parent: C. H. Patterson
- Scientific career
- Workplaces: President and Research Director of The Gorilla Foundation

Francine "Penny" Patterson (born February 13, 1947) is an American animal psychologist. From 1972 onwards, she taught a modified form of American Sign Language, which she called "Gorilla Sign Language" (GSL), to a gorilla named Koko. The scientific validity of Patterson's claims about the extent of Koko's language mastery has been widely rejected in linguistic and other specialist circles.

== Early life and education ==
Patterson is the second oldest of seven children and daughter of C. H. Patterson, a professor of psychology, and Frances Spano Patterson. She was born in Chicago and moved with her family to Edina, Minnesota, when she was young, and then to Urbana, Illinois. Her mother died of cancer when Patterson was a freshman in college and the youngest of her siblings was just five years old. This triggered her interest in developmental psychology, a theme which pervaded much of her later work.

Patterson earned her bachelor's degree in psychology at the University of Illinois at Urbana-Champaign in 1970. She attained her Ph.D. in 1979 from Stanford University, with her dissertation Linguistic Capabilities of a Lowland Gorilla, on teaching sign language to Koko and Michael, another Western lowland gorilla, who died in 2000.

== Career ==
Patterson is the president and research director of The Gorilla Foundation. The foundation was founded with her longtime research colleague Ronald Cohn and Barbara F Hiller in 1978 using monetary support from a Rolex Award. The Gorilla Foundation had been trying to move from its current home in Woodside, California, to Maui, Hawaii. Patterson is an adjunct professor of psychology at Santa Clara University and a member of the Board of Consultants at the Center for Cross Cultural Communication in Washington, D.C. She is the Editor-in-Chief of the Gorilla journal.

Patterson and her work with Koko are the subject of Barbet Schroeder's 1978 feature-length documentary Koko: A Talking Gorilla. She is also an author of nonfiction works, including The Education of Koko, Koko's Kitten, Koko-Love!: Conversations With a Signing Gorilla, and Koko's Story. All of these books deal with her personal experiences with Koko.

Patterson's work has garnered controversy. Multiple allegations, made by former employees, said that she would routinely show her nipples to Koko and demand that other employees, both female and male, present their nipples to the gorilla. These demands never occurred with important donors. A sexual harassment lawsuit over this matter was settled out of court.

== See also ==
- Great ape language research
- Koko (gorilla)
- Michael (gorilla)
- Chimp Crazy - documentary about women who identify as "mothers" of apes or monkeys
