= Sue Savage-Rumbaugh =

Psychologist and primatologist (born 1946)

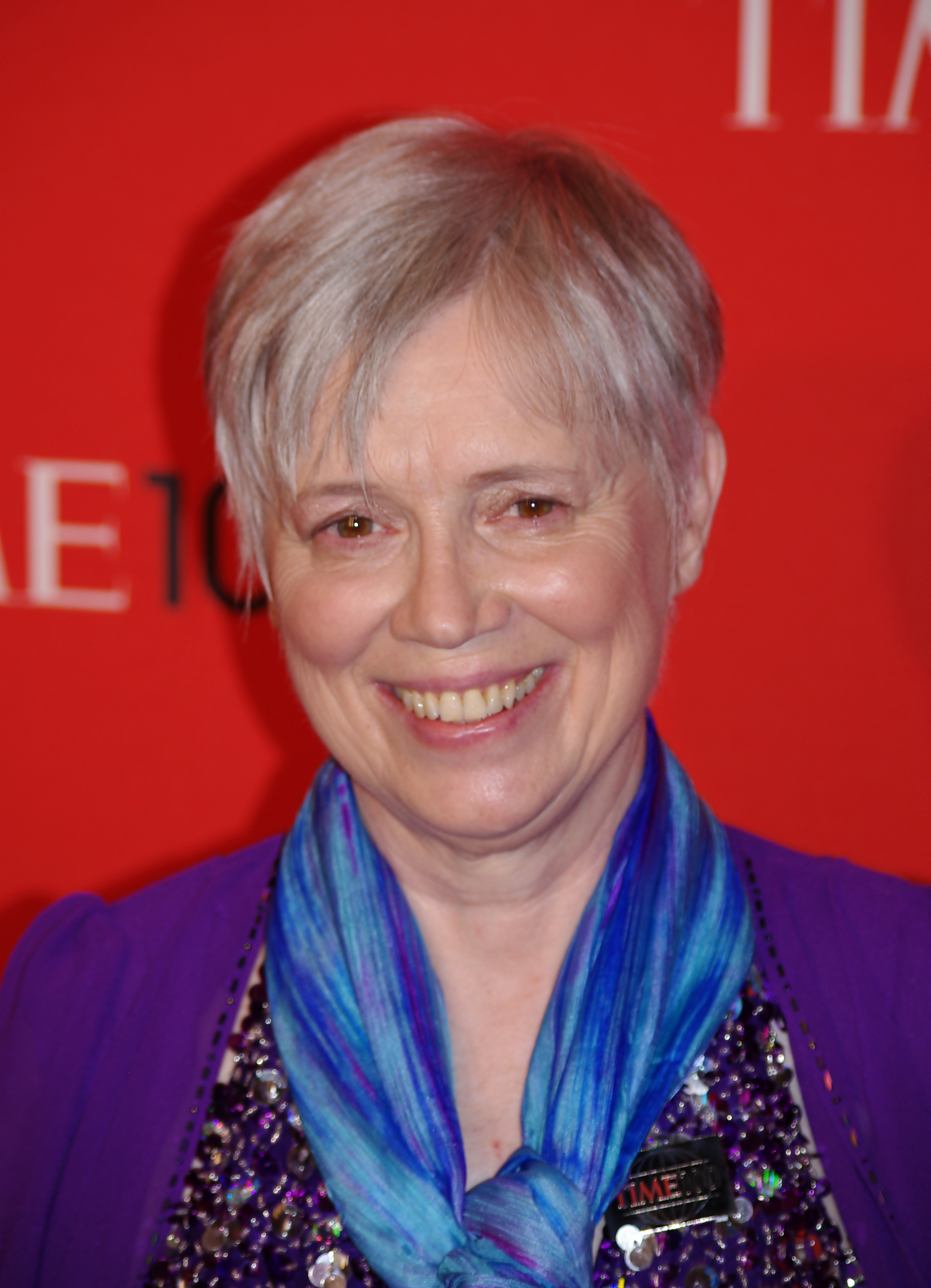
- Savage-Rumbaugh at the 2011 Time 100 gala
- Born: August 16, 1946 (age 79)
- Occupations: Primatologist, psychologist, educator
- Children: 1
- Relatives: Duane Rumbaugh (ex-husband)

Emily Sue Savage-Rumbaugh (born August 16, 1946) is an American psychologist and primatologist most known for her work with two bonobos, Kanzi and Panbanisha, investigating their linguistic and cognitive abilities using lexigrams and computer-based keyboards. Originally based at Georgia State University's Language Research Center in Atlanta, Georgia, she worked at the Iowa Primate Learning Sanctuary in Des Moines, Iowa from 2006 until her departure in November 2013.

== Early life, family and education ==
Savage-Rumbaugh was born in Springfield, Missouri, to Euell Rubert and Joyce Rubert. She studied psychology at Colorado College before transferring to Southwest Missouri State University, where she earned her BA degree in 1970.^{[1]} She planned to attend grad school at Harvard University under B.F. Skinner, but after a fellowship there fell through, she switched gears. A lecture by Roger Fouts, who was working to teach young chimpanzees sign language at University of Oklahoma (UO), caught her interest. She decided to study at UO instead, getting an MS degree and, in 1975, a Ph.D. in psychology, under the direction of William Lemmon, who ran UO's Institute for Primate Studies.^{[1]} Her dissertation, "Mother-infant behavior in group-living captive chimpanzees," examined the way captive animals used gestures and posture to communicate.

While at UO, Sue had married William Savage, Jr. Their marriage ended in divorce after Sue took a position in Atlanta, moving with her son from a previous marriage.

== Career ==
After getting her Ph.D., Savage-Rumbaugh (then known as "Sue Savage") moved to Atlanta, where she conducted research at Emory University's Yerkes Primate Center and joined the Language Analog (LANA) project co-headed by Duane Rumbaugh, professor and chair of psychology at Georgia State University. (The two married and became long-time collaborators.) The LANA project aimed to teach a juvenile chimpanzee, Lana, to communicate using a computer and graphic symbols donned "lexigrams."

She was subsequently a professor and researcher at Georgia State University's Departments of Biology and Psychology (also in Atlanta) for 25 years, associated closely with the school's Language Research Center.

She then became a professor and researcher at Simpson College and the University of Iowa, along with its Iowa Primate Learning Sanctuary and the Great Ape Trust she launched (renamed the Ape Cognition and Conservation Initiative since 2013) beginning in 2005, bringing Kanzi there that same year. In September 2012, Savage-Rumbaugh was placed on leave after a group of 12 former employees alleged that she had neglected the bonobos in her care. Though Savage-Rumbaugh was internally cleared of wrongdoing and reinstated in November of that year, she collapsed on the job, underwent a six-month medical leave, and upon her return was ordered to leave in light of recent new hires. She relocated to New Jersey – becoming embroiled in several legal battles with the Ape Cognition and Conservation Initiative – and again to her home state of Missouri.

== Research ==
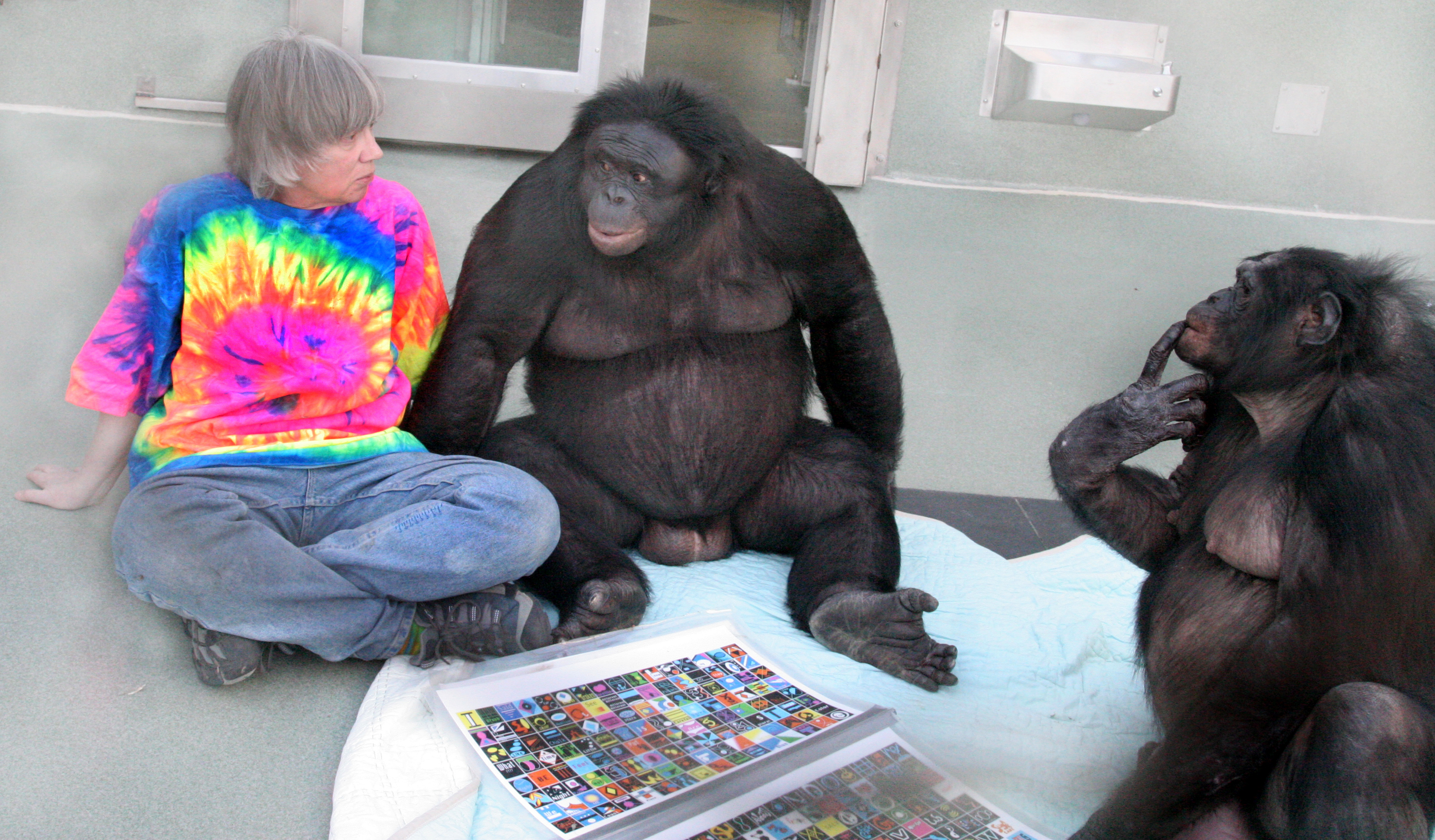
Bonobos Kanzi and Panbanisha with Sue Savage-Rumbaugh

Savage-Rumbaugh is a developer of the Yerkish language; this is a lexigram in that language, representing her.

Savage-Rumbaugh was the first scientist to conduct language research with bonobos.

At the Georgia State University's Language Research Center, Savage-Rumbaugh helped pioneer the use of a number of new technologies for working with primates. These include a keyboard which provides for speech synthesis, allowing the animals to communicate using spoken English, and a "primate friendly" computer-based joystick terminal that permits the automated presentation of many different computerized tasks. Information developed at the center regarding the abilities of non-human primates to acquire symbols, comprehend spoken words, decode simple syntactical structures, learn concepts of number and quantity, and perform complex perceptual-motor tasks has helped change the way humans view other members of the primate order.

Savage-Rumbaugh's work with Kanzi, the first ape to spontaneously acquire words in the same manner as children, was detailed in Language Comprehension in Ape and Child published in Monographs of the Society for Research in Child Development (1993). It was selected by the "Millennium Project" as one of the top 100 most influential works in cognitive science in the 20th century by the University of Minnesota Center for Cognitive Sciences in 1991.

Her view of language – that it is not confined to humans and is learnable by other ape species – is generally criticized and not accepted by researchers from linguistics, psychology and other sciences of the brain and mind. For example, the cognitive scientist Steven Pinker strongly criticized the position of Savage-Rumbaugh and others in his award-winning The Language Instinct, arguing that Kanzi and other non-human primates failed to grasp the fundamentals of language.

According to Alexander Fiske-Harrison, who visited Savage-Rumbaugh in 2001 for the Financial Times, her methods differ from the more clinical techniques of other researchers such as Frans de Waal by taking a "holistic approach to the research, rearing the apes from birth and immersing them in a "linguistic world"."

She was asked how she and her (now former) husband Duane Rumbaugh's study was influenced by living and working together while still at Georgia State University, responding "I don't think anyone could ever be accountable for as many apes as we have here if we weren't together. Duane and I reside immediately next to the research centre and are available 24 hours a day, 365 days a year. We go if an ape is sick, if one of the apes has escaped, or if Panbanisha is scared because the river is going to flood."

According to Terrace et al (1979) in their analysis titled "Can An Ape Create a Sentence", apes do not create sentences. They do not move on from the phase of imitation nor begin to create sentences by adding complexity as the mean sentence length increases. When analyzed, creative combinations that appear meaningful can be explained by simpler nonlinguistic properties. Further examination by Thompson and Church "An Explanation of the Language of a Chimpanzee" (1980) point to pair-associative learning followed by reinforcement as an explanation for sentence-like productions.

== Honors and awards ==
Savage-Rumbaugh received the Leighton A. Wilkie Award in Anthropology from Indiana University in 2000. In 2011, she was recognized as one of Time magazine's 100 Most Influential People in the World.

Savage-Rumbaugh has been awarded honorary Ph.D.s by the University of Chicago in 1997 and Missouri State University in 2008.

== Personal life ==
Savage-Rumbaugh has resided in Missouri; Atlanta, Georgia; Iowa; and New Jersey. From 1976 to 2000, she was married to Dr. Duane Rumbaugh who was also a primate research scientist at Yerkes Primate Center and at the Language Resource Center of Georgia State University, where he was chair of the Psychology Department. She has a son, Shane, whom Rumbaugh adopted.

== Bibliography ==
- Brakke, Karen E.; Savage-Rumbaugh, E.Sue (April 1995). "The development of language skills in bonobo and chimpanzee—I. Comprehension". Language & Communication. 15 (2): 121–148. doi:10.1016/0271-5309(95)00001-7.
- Savage-Rumbaugh, E.S. 1986. Ape Language: From Conditioned Response to Symbol. New York: Columbia University Press. ISBN 0231061986
- Savage-Rumbaugh, E.S., and Roger Lewin. 1996. Kanzi: The Ape at the Brink of the Human Mind. Wiley. ISBN 0-471-15959-X
- Savage-Rumbaugh, E.S., Stuart G. Shanker, and Talbot J. Taylor. 2001. Apes, Language, and the Human Mind. Oxford. ISBN 0-19-514712-X
- Lyn, Heidi; Greenfield, Patricia M.; Savage-Rumbaugh, Sue; Gillespie-Lynch, Kristen; Hopkins, William D. (January 2011). "Nonhuman primates do declare! A comparison of declarative symbol and gesture use in two children, two bonobos, and a chimpanzee". Language & Communication. 31 (1): 63–74. doi:10.1016/j.langcom.2010.11.001. PMC 3079886. PMID 21516208.
- Rumbaugh, Duane M., E. Sue Savage-Rumbaugh, James E. King and Jared P. Taglialatela. "The Foundations of Primate Intelligence and Language", The Human Brain Evolving: Paleoneurological Studies in Honor of Ralph L. Holloway, Stone Age Institute Press (2011).
- Gillespie-Lynch, K., Greenfield, P. M., Lyn, H., & Savage-Rumbaugh, S. (January 2011). The role of dialogue in the ontogeny and phylogeny of early word combinations. First Language.
- Savage-Rumbaugh, S. (2010) "Human Language-Human Consciousness", On the Human, National Humanities Center
- Savage-Rumbaugh, E.S., Rumbaugh, D.M., & Fields, W.M. (2009) "Empirical Kanzi: The ape language debate revisited". The Skeptic.
- Lyn, Heidi; Franks, Becca; Savage-Rumbaugh, E. Sue (July 2008). "Precursors of morality in the use of the symbols 'good' and 'bad' in two bonobos (Pan paniscus) and a chimpanzee (Pan troglodytes)". Language & Communication. 28 (3): 213–224. doi:10.1016/j.langcom.2008.01.006.
- Greenfield, P. M., Lyn, H., & Savage-Rumbaugh, E. S. (2008). "Protolanguage in ontogeny and phylogeny: combining deixis and representation". Interaction Studies, 9(1), 34-50.
- Rumbaugh, Duane M.; Washburn, David A.; King, James E.; Beran, M. J.; K. Gould, K.; Savage-Rumbaugh, E. Sue (January 2008). "Why Some Apes Imitate and/or Emulate Observed Behavior and Others Do Not: Fact, Theory, and Implications for Our Kind". Journal of Cognitive Education and Psychology. 7 (1): 101–110. doi:10.1891/194589508787382006.
- Savage-Rumbaugh, S. & Fields, W.M. (2007) "Rules and Tools: Beyond Anthropomorphism: A qualitative report on the stone tool manufacture and use by captive bonobos Kanzi and Panbanisha".In N. Toth's Craft Institute Oldowan Technologies 1(1).
- Fields, W.M., Segerdahl, P., & Savage-Rumbaugh, E.S. (2007) "The Material Practices of Ape Language." In J. Valsiner & Alberto Rosa (eds.) The Cambridge Handbook of Socio-Cultural Psychology, Cambridge: Cambridge University Press.
- Rumbaugh, D. M., E. S. Savage-Rumbaugh, & Taglialatela, J. (2007). (L. Squire, ed.) "Language Nonhuman Animals". The New Encyclopedia of Neuroscience. New York: Elsevier.
- Savage-Rumbaugh, S., Rumbaugh, D.M. & W.M. Fields. (2006) "Language as a Window on the Cultural Mind." In S. Hurley (Ed.) Rational Animals, Oxford: Oxford University Press.
- Lyn, Heidi; Greenfield, Patricia; Savage-Rumbaugh, Sue (July 2006). "The development of representational play in chimpanzees and bonobos: Evolutionary implications, pretense, and the role of interspecies communication". Cognitive Development. 21 (3): 199–213. doi:10.1016/j.cogdev.2006.03.005.
- Sue Savage-Rumbaugh, Kanzi Wamba, Panbanisha Wamba and Nyota Wamba. (2007) "Welfare of Apes in Captive Environments: Comments On, and By, a Specific Group of Apes." Journal of Applied Animal Welfare Science.
- Savage-Rumbaugh, Sue; M. Fields, William; Segerdahl, Par (6 September 2005). "Culture Prefigures Cognition in Pan/Homo Bonobos". Theoria. 20 (3): 311–328. doi:10.1387/theoria.565. hdl:10810/39298.
- Savage-Rumbaugh, E.S., Segerdahl, P., Fields, W.M. (2005) "Individual Differences in Language Competencies in Apes Resulting from Unique Rearing Conditions Imposed by Different First Epistemologies." in L.L. Namy & S.R. Waxman (Eds.)
- Segerdahl, P., Fields, W.M., & Savage-Rumbaugh, E.S. (2005) Kanzi's Primal Language: The Cultural Initiation of Apes Into Language. London: Palgrave/Macmillan.
- Savage-Rumbaugh, Sue; Fields, William M.; Spircu, Tiberu (September 2004). "The emergence of knapping and vocal expression embedded in a Pan/Homo culture". Biology & Philosophy. 19 (4): 541–575. doi:10.1007/sBIPH-004-0528-0.
- Fields, W.M., & Savage-Rumbaugh, S. (2003). [Review of the book A Mind So Rare: The Evolution of Human Consciousness]. Contemporary Psychology 48(8).
- Savage-Rumbaugh, S., Fields, W. (2002) "Hacias el control de nuevas realidades," Quark (25), 20-26.
- Savage-Rumbaugh, S., Fields, W.M. & Taglialetela, J. (2001) "Language, Speech, Tools and Writing: A cultural imperative." In Thompson, E. (Ed.), Between Ourselves: Second-person issues in the study of consciousness, (pp. 273–292) Exeter, UK: Imprint Academic.
- Savage-Rumbaugh, E. Sue; Fields, William M. (June 2000). "Linguistic, Cultural and Cognitive Capacities of Bonobos(Pan Paniscus)". Culture & Psychology. 6 (2): 131–153. doi:10.1177/1354067x0062003.
- "Perception of Personality Traits and Semantic Learning in Evolving Hominids." The Descent of Mind: Psychological Perspectives on Hominid Evolution (pp. 98–115), Oxford University Press, 1999.
- "Ape Communication: Between a Rock and a Hard Place." Origins of Language: What Non-Human Primates Can Tell Us, School of American Research Press, 1999.
- Schick, Kathy D.; Toth, Nicholas; Garufi, Gary; Savage-Rumbaugh, E.Sue; Rumbaugh, Duane; Sevcik, Rose (July 1999). "Continuing Investigations into the Stone Tool-making and Tool-using Capabilities of a Bonobo (Pan paniscus)". Journal of Archaeological Science. 26 (7): 821–832. Bibcode:1999JArSc..26..821S. doi:10.1006/jasc.1998.0350.
- "Language, Comprehension in Ape and Child" (Monographs of the Society for Research in Child Development) Sue Savage-Rumbaugh, Jeannine Murphy, Rose A. Sevcik, Karen E. Brakke, Shelly L. Williams and Duane M. Rumbaugh; University Of Chicago Press (July 1993)
