= Ape Cognition and Conservation Initiative =

Scientific research facility

- Formation: September 28, 2004; 21 years ago
- Type: Sanctuary
- Legal status: 501(c)(3)
- Purpose: understanding the origins and future of culture, language, tools and intelligence
- Headquarters: USA
- Location: Des Moines
- Website: http://apeinitiative.org/

Ape Cognition and Conservation Initiative is a great ape sanctuary and scientific research facility in Des Moines, Iowa. The facility was announced in 2002 and received its first ape residents in 2004, conceived of as the Great Ape Trust, or Iowa Primate Learning Sanctuary, launched in part by the primatologist Sue Savage-Rumbaugh and Des Moines businessman Ted Townsend. Renamed in 2013, it is currently home to a colony of six bonobos involved in non-invasive interdisciplinary studies of their cognitive and communicative capabilities. Ape Initiative is now supported by Kennesaw State University.

== Research ==
Ape Cognition and Conservation Initiative is situated on 230 acres and houses a family of six bonobos, named Elikya, Maisha, Nyota, Teco, Clara, and Mali. It housed Kanzi up to his 2025 death. Three of the bonobos learned important elements of human culture during their crucial first year of life. As a youngster, Kanzi acquired language competency by simply watching humans attempt to teach language to Matata, the wild-caught grandmother of the family. Nyota is the first ape reared both by humans and a language-competent ape mother. The youngest, Teco, provides a unique look into the epigenetic effects of language acquisition. All three of these bonobos communicate with humans using a collection of over 400 "lexigram" symbols printed on paper or appearing on computer touch screens.

It has been repeatedly claimed that these bonobos can think, make plans and understand simple spoken English. Kanzi was filmed making music, building a fire, and crafting simple stone tools. More than 400 scientific papers and many books document the capabilities of the bonobos, and films portraying their achievements have been broadcast worldwide. Television coverage includes features with Oprah, Anderson Cooper, 60 Minutes (in Australia), BBC, Paul McCartney and Peter Gabriel.
