= Koko (gorilla) =

Captive gorilla studied by researchers

- Koko in December 2015
- Species: Western gorilla
- Sex: Female
- Born: July 4, 1971; San Francisco Zoo, U.S.
- Died: June 19, 2018 (aged 46); The Gorilla Foundation, Woodside, California, U.S.
- Resting place: The Gorilla Foundation
- Known for: Use of sign language; Pet keeping; Intelligence
- Weight: 270 lb (120 kg)
- www.koko.org

Hanabiko, nicknamed "Koko" (July 4, 1971 – June 19, 2018), was a female western lowland gorilla born in the San Francisco Zoo and cross-fostered by Francine Patterson for use in ape language experiments. Koko gained public attention as the subject of two National Geographic cover stories and, in 1985, the best-selling children's picture book, Koko's Kitten. Koko brought widespread attention to her critically endangered species.

Koko's communication skills were highly debated. She used many signs adapted from American Sign Language, and understood nouns, verbs, and adjectives, including abstract concepts such as "good" and "false", scoring between 70 and 90 on various IQ scales, with some experts, including Mary Lee Jensvold, stating that Koko "used language in the same way as people". However, the scientific consensus is that she did not demonstrate the syntax or grammar required of true language. Meanwhile, Patterson herself has been widely criticized for misrepresenting Koko's skills, providing insufficient care for Koko and her companion gorillas, and treating Gorilla Foundation staff members inappropriately.

Koko's story helped to change the public image of gorillas, previously assumed to be brainless and violent. After Koko's death, the journal Science published an obituary noting that she had "helped transform how the human world viewed animal emotion—and intelligence".

== Early life and popularity ==
Koko was born on July 4, 1971, at the San Francisco Zoo to her mother Jacqueline and father Bwana. (The name "Hanabiko" (花火子), lit. 'firework girl', is of Japanese origin and is a reference to her date of birth, the Fourth of July.) Koko remained with her mother until December, when she was hospitalized due to malnutrition, then hand-tended in the zookeeper's home.

Patterson originally cared for Koko at the San Francisco Zoo as part of her doctoral research at Stanford University. Up through June 1973, she conducted sign language lessons with Koko from the Children's Zoo exhibit. The environment was noisy and distracting, so Patterson and her life partner Ronald "Ron" Cohn purchased a trailer in which they could conduct Koko's signing sessions.

Around this time, Patterson realized that conflict with the zoo was "inevitable". She started the project on the condition that Koko would be reunited with her gorilla colony after a few years. Gorillas are social animals and suffer when isolated from their species. And, as gorillas are endangered, the zoo expected to breed Koko. But Patterson felt that she had become Koko's "mother" and convinced the zoo to let her move the gorilla to Stanford.

Once at Stanford, Patterson worked to wrest custody of Koko from the San Francisco Zoo. Patterson found an exotic species dealer who sold her two infant gorillas that she suspected were illegally "harvested" (a process that involves killing the mother and any surrounding adults). Her plan was to give the female to the zoo as a replacement for Koko and keep the male as a playmate, but the female died within a month. Only the male, Michael, survived.

Stuck without a viable trade for the zoo, Patterson launched a "Save Koko" press campaign, telling reporters that if Koko had to go back to the zoo, she might sink into depression, refuse to eat, and possibly die. The Save Koko campaign generated $3,000 in donations and, with additional funds from a wealthy benefactor, allowed Patterson to maintain custody of Koko. Around this time, Patterson founded (with Ron Cohn and lawyer Edward Fitzsimmons) the nonprofit Gorilla Foundation.

=== Koko's Kitten ===
In 1978, Koko gained worldwide attention when she was pictured on the cover of National Geographic magazine. The cover was a photo of Koko taking her own picture in the mirror. Koko was later featured on the cover of National Geographic in 1985 with a picture of her and her kitten, All-Ball.

In 1985, Scholastic Inc. published Koko's Kitten, a children's picture book based on the National Geographic story. The book was favorably reviewed and became one of Scholastic's best sellers. Written by Patterson, it describes Koko's yearning for a cat, her adoption of All-Ball, and Koko's sadness after the kitten is hit by a car and killed. The story is peppered throughout with Koko's signs such as "cry", "sleep" and "cat". Koko's Kitten is still in print.

== Characteristics ==
=== Use of language and controversy ===
Francine Patterson published a few peer-reviewed studies on her work with Koko in the late 1970s. She demonstrated that Koko was able to communicate using a number of signs adapted from American Sign Language. Gorillas have thick, stubby fingers and hands that move differently than humans, so Koko was unable to make some ASL signs. Francine Patterson used the term "Gorilla Sign Language" to refer to Koko's adaptations.

Patterson reported that Koko invented new signs to communicate novel thoughts. For example, she said that nobody taught Koko the word for "ring", so Koko combined the words "finger" and "bracelet", hence "finger-bracelet".

In 1979, Herbert S. Terrace published the negative results of his Nim Chimpsky study, which presented evidence that Koko was mimicking her trainers. Terrace's article ignited intense debate over the ape language experiments (see "Scientific criticism" below), culminating in the 1980 "Clever Hans" conference that mocked the other researchers involved. Funding for the ape language experiments disappeared seemingly overnight.

While other scientists severed ties with their apes after funding dried up, Patterson maintained responsibility for Koko. (Most of the chimps who worked with Terrace, as well as with the Gardners, were sold to medical labs for use in testing.) Though Patterson had initially defended her scientific work, she turned her focus away from science and toward securing revenue for the upkeep of Koko and Michael. Her work involved fund-raising, PR campaigns, and managing Gorilla Foundation caregiving staff. After 1978, Patterson and Koko had no affiliation with any university or government funding.

=== Scientific criticism ===
Francine Patterson's published research received a variety of criticisms from the scientific community. Herbert S. Terrace and Laura-Ann Petitto, researchers who worked with Nim Chimpsky, issued critical evaluations of Patterson's reports and suggested that Koko was simply being prompted by her trainers' unconscious cues to display specific signs. Terrace and Petitto questioned Patterson's interpretations of Koko's signing and her claims of grammatical competency, asking for more rigorous testing. (Terrace and Petitto reported negative results in their Nim study, which was itself criticized on methodological grounds.) Other researchers argued that Koko did not understand the meaning behind what she was doing and learned to complete the signs simply because the researchers rewarded her for doing so (indicating that her actions were the product of operant conditioning). Another concern was that interpretation of the gorilla's conversation was left to the handler, who may have seen improbable concatenations of signs as meaningful; for example, when Koko signed "sad" there was no way to tell whether she meant it with the connotation of "How sad." Patterson defended her research, stating that blind and double-blind experiments had been administered to evaluate the gorillas' comprehension, that the gorillas were able to sign spontaneously to each other and to strangers without the prompting of a trainer, and that they signed meaningfully the majority of the time.

Later critics noted that Patterson used Koko in deceptive ways in popular media. These concerns were echoed privately by staff at the Gorilla Foundation, where turnover was high. Some, like research assistant Anne Southecomb, expressed concerns that Patterson's exaggerated claims and "over-interpretation" undermined and disvalued their work. (Southcombe left to work with orangutan Chantek on a research project she preferred.) Sign language expert Sherman Wilcox, for example, characterized the Foundation's edited clips of Koko making a "climate speech" as deceptive and "disrespectful of ASL". Wilcox expressed concerns that the bit would reinforce the perception that ASL is "only words and no syntax".

Eugene Linden, a journalist who spent years studying apes involved in language experiments and co-wrote (with Patterson) The Education of Koko, also expressed concerns about Patterson's practices. Linden reported that Koko's signing was more fluid and precise than that of Washoe and other Oklahoma chimpanzees. She was also by nature less impulsive; though, like the chimps, she frequently refused to participate in language drills. When not pushed to perform or stressed by strangers, "the amount of signing by Koko seemed to me to overwhelm [Patterson's] capacity to digest and analyze it," Linden wrote. But in Linden's view, Patterson's exaggerated claims, "bunker mentality", refusal to provide researchers access to Koko, and unwillingness to open up the data she had collected minimized Koko's impact.

Ultimately, critics of Patterson's claims acknowledged that Koko had learned a number of signs and used them to communicate her wants. But this did not mean that Koko "spoke" sign language, which requires a grasp of syntax and grammatical sentences. Experts generally agreed that Koko's use of sentences was unsupported by evidence.

=== Care practices criticism ===
Former employees of The Gorilla Foundation criticized the methods used to care for Koko and her male companion Ndume. In 2012 nine staff members, including caregivers and researchers, out of "roughly a dozen" resigned, and several submitted a letter to the board to explain their concerns. Former caregiver John Safkow stated that all members of the board left after the walkout, except for Betty White. A pseudonymous source, "Sarah", told Slate that Koko's diet included an excess of processed meat and candy, and that Koko was given a traditional Thanksgiving dinner yearly. The source stated that the official diet they were told to give Koko was appropriate, but that Patterson would visit and feed her "chocolates and meats". Koko's weight of 270 pounds (120 kg) was higher than would be normal for a female gorilla in the wild, approximately 150–200 pounds (70–90 kg); the foundation stated that Koko "is, like her mother, a larger frame Gorilla." Multiple employees corroborated the claim that both Koko and Ndume were given "massive" numbers of supplements on the recommendation of a naturopath; Safkow recalled that the number was between 70 and 100 pills per day, and "Sarah" claimed that various inappropriate foods like smoked turkey, pea soup, non-alcoholic beer, and candy were used as treats to coax Koko to take the pills. The Gorilla Foundation stated that Koko took "between 5 to 15 types of nutritional supplements" and acknowledged their use of homeopathic remedies.

Several former caregivers at The Gorilla Foundation also raised concerns that Koko's companion Ndume was being neglected. In 2012, a group of former employees reached out to a blogger who focused on the ape caregiver community, who in turn asked the USDA Animal and Plant Health Inspection Service (APHIS) to follow up on the claims. After an investigation, APHIS reported that Ndume had been neglected in some aspects; for instance, he had not been tested for tuberculosis in 20 years, despite the recommendation being to test gorillas for tuberculosis yearly.

In the 2010s, as Koko neared the end of her life, anthropologist and primatologist Barbara J. King questioned the ethics of Patterson's caretaking decisions, and criticized the foundation for excessively anthropomorphizing Koko.

=== Nipple fixation and lawsuit ===
Like other apes raised by humans (Lucy, Washoe), Koko did not develop the sexual instincts of an ape raised in the wild. According to Patterson, she developed several crushes on human men. For example, Koko "maintained a near-constant vigil by the trailer window" when a favorite workman was expected to show—and blew him kisses after he arrived. Though Patterson secured male gorillas Michael and Ndume for Koko to mate with, she was not sexually interested in them. (As a result, Ndume was caged separately, in isolation.)

Koko was reported to have a preoccupation with seeing nipples. In 2005, three female staff members at The Gorilla Foundation, where Koko resided, filed lawsuits against the organization, alleging that they were pressured to reveal their nipples to Koko by Patterson, the organization's executive director, among other violations of labor law. The lawsuit alleged that in response to signing from Koko, Patterson pressured Keller and Alperin (two of the female staff) to flash the ape. "Oh, yes, Koko, Nancy has nipples. Nancy can show you her nipples," Patterson reportedly said on one occasion. And on another: "Koko, you see my nipples all the time. You are probably bored with my nipples. You need to see new nipples. I will turn my back so Kendra can show you her nipples." Shortly thereafter, a third woman filed suit, alleging that upon being first introduced to Koko, Patterson told her that Koko was communicating that she wanted to see the woman's nipples, pressuring her to submit to Koko's demands and informing her that "everyone does it for her around here." When the woman briefly lifted her t-shirt, flashing her undergarments, Patterson admonished the woman and reiterated that Koko wanted to see her nipples. When the woman relented and showed her breasts to Koko, Patterson commented "Oh look, Koko, she has big nipples." On another occasion, one of the gorilla's handlers told the woman that Koko wanted to be alone with her. When the woman went to Koko's enclosure, Koko began to squat and breathe heavily. The lawsuits were settled out of court.

When asked to comment on the matter, gorilla expert Kristen Lukas said that other gorillas are not known to have had a similar nipple fixation. (Most captive gorillas are housed in social groups with other gorillas, whose nipples are naturally exposed. Koko was unusual in living among humans and without a gorilla cohort.) A former caregiver stated that Patterson would interpret the sign for "nipple" as a sound-alike, "people", when notable donors were present.

== Later life and death ==
After Patterson's research with Koko was completed, the gorilla moved to a reserve in Woodside, California. At the reserve, Koko lived with another gorilla, Michael, but he died in 2000. She then lived with another male gorilla, Ndume, until her death.

At the preserve, Koko also met and interacted with a variety of celebrities, including Robin Williams, Fred Rogers, Betty White, William Shatner, Flea, Leonardo DiCaprio, Peter Gabriel, and Sting.

Koko died in her sleep during the morning of June 19, 2018, at the Gorilla Foundation's preserve in Woodside, California, at the age of 46. The Gorilla Foundation released a statement that "The impact has been profound and what she has taught us about the emotional capacity of gorillas and their cognitive abilities will continue to shape the world." Despite her comparatively old age, her death took staff members of the Gorilla Foundation by surprise. Ndume was transferred to the Cincinnati Zoo after a lengthy legal battle.

== Resources for additional information ==
=== Books and documentaries ===
- 1978 Koko: A Talking Gorilla, a documentary film by Barbet Schroeder
- 1978 cover of National Geographic magazine was a self-portrait by Koko, followed by a feature article
- 1981 The Education of Koko, a book by Patterson and naturalist Eugene Linden (ISBN 0030461014)
- 1985 Koko's Kitten, a picture book by Patterson and photographer Ronald Cohn (ISBN 0590444255)
- 1986 Silent Partners: The Legacy of the Ape Language Experiments, a book by Eugene Linden (ISBN 0345342348)
- 1987 Koko's Story, a children's book by Patterson for Scholastic Corporation (ISBN 0590413643)
- 1990 Koko's Kitten, a 15-minute re-enactment of the story of the gorilla's adoption of a kitten, featured in the PBS children's show Reading Rainbow
- 1999 A Conversation with Koko, a PBS documentary for Nature, narrated by Martin Sheen
- 1999 The Parrot's Lament, by Eugene Linden (ISBN 0525944761)
- 2000 Koko-Love!, a picture book by Patterson and photographer Ronald Cohn (ISBN 0525463194)
- 2001 Koko and Robin Williams, a short featurette on Robin Williams meeting Koko
- 2008 Little Beauty, a picture book by Anthony Browne inspired by Koko's adoption of a pet kitten (ISBN 0763649678)
- 2016 Koko: The Gorilla Who Talks to People, a BBC documentary also shown on PBS
- 2019 A Wish for Koko, a children's book in honor of Koko's life

=== Movies and television shows ===
- 1998 Mister Rogers' Neighborhood, Episode 1727 (You and I Together); Mister Rogers visits with Koko who has learned how to communicate with signs from American Sign Language.

== See also ==
- Great ape language
- Primate cognition
- List of individual apes
