= Cognitive tradeoff hypothesis =

Hypothesis about the evolution of human language

The cognitive tradeoff hypothesis argues that in the cognitive evolution of humans, there was an evolutionary tradeoff between short-term working memory and complex language skills. Specifically, early hominids sacrificed the robust working memory seen in chimpanzees for more complex representations and hierarchical organization used in language. The theory was first brought forth by Japanese primatologist Tetsuro Matsuzawa, a former director of the Primate Research Institute of Kyoto University (KUPRI).

Matsuzawa suggests that at a certain point in evolution, because of limitations in brain capacity, the human brain may have acquired new functions in parallel with losing others – such as acquiring language while losing visuospatial temporal storage ability.

== Relevant research ==
Matsuzawa, whose research focuses on chimpanzee intelligence, suggests the tradeoff hypothesis as a possible explanation as to why chimpanzees have better memory than humans for immediately capturing and retaining visual stimuli in his paper "Symbolic representation of number in chimpanzees". The following rationalization is his attempt to explain the reasoning behind the hypothesis: "The common ancestor of humans and chimpanzees may have had the same kind of memory skill. However, in the course of human evolution, we lost the skill while we acquired other language‐related skills: representation, chunking, hierarchical organization, syntactic rules, etc. Brain volume capacity was limited at a certain point in evolution, so we had to lose some function to get a new function."

As a part of The Ai Project, some chimpanzees at Matsuzawa's lab at KUPRI were trained to play a game that involved memorizing a series of numerals that flash on the screen for a brief period of time, as well as their respective positions. The study found that the chimpanzees completed the task with a higher level of accuracy and speed than did the human subjects, suggesting that their working memory capabilities are more powerful.

While the chimpanzees outperformed human adults in memorizing briefly presented numbers that appeared on the screen, the researchers found that chimpanzees were less proficient at a variety of other cognitive tasks including imitation, cross-modal matching, symmetry of symbols and referents, and one-to-one correspondence. Matsuzawa came up with the cognitive tradeoff hypothesis to explain this difference in cognitive capabilities of human beings and chimpanzees, their closest living relatives.

== Response and criticism ==
In his paper, Matsuzawa claims that his tradeoff theory has support from a phylogenetic as well as ontogenetic perspective. In human beings, youth often outperform adults on certain memory tasks. In the course of cognitive development, human children may acquire linguistic skills at the cost of losing a chimpanzee-like photographic memory.

Some critics have brought up research contradicting the ideas proposed by the cognitive tradeoff hypothesis: First, there is not necessarily a need to have lost certain functions to gain new facilities, as the human brain is about three times larger than the brain of the chimpanzee. Moreover, the cerebral cortex of the human brain – which plays a key role in memory, attention, awareness and thought – contains twice as many cells in humans as the same region in chimpanzees. Secondly, the recent evolution of chimpanzees and humans has been in completely different environments, with different survival needs. Therefore, the difference in working memory capabilities and other cognitive functions discussed by Matsuzawa might be adaptive rather than "tradeoffs".

Uncertainty remains regarding the supremacy of the chimpanzee capabilities in comparison to those of humans, particularly when taking practice effects into account. Human studies indicate that, with proper training, humans can match or exceed the performance of the best chimpanzees on some short-delay visual working memory tasks, although chimpanzees may still over-perform on tasks with more concurrent stimuli. Silberberg and Kearns (2009) found that humans with extensive training with 210 ms delay trials could match Ayumu's performance. However, Ayumu did not train with short delays before demonstrating strong performance at 210 ms. Cook and Wilson (2010) trained two undergraduates on the same task with 650 ms delays, the same mean delay that chimpanzees demonstrated in their non-time-pressured task training. After 6,000 650 ms training trials, the human participants were tested at 210 ms with 5 numerals and performed at 94 and 96% accuracy, significantly better than any of the reported chimpanzees. A subsequent study by Sean Roberts at the Max Planck Institute also showed the importance of training in human performance, but suggested chimpanzees might still out-perform humans on trials with seven or more concurrent stimuli. While chimpanzees have been reported to perform correctly 80% of the time, with 8 numerals at 210ms, out of a large pool of human participants, the best human performer was only able to get 80% of his trials correct on only 6 numerals, at 210ms. The human in this study with the highest number of trials completed 3,382 trials, only slightly more than half those completed during training by participants in the Cook and Wilson study. With years of daily experience on this and related tasks, Ayumu and other high performing chimpanzees almost certainly completed far more trials than any human tested.

== See also ==
- Ai (chimpanzee)
- Ayumu
- Animal consciousness
- Neuropsychological Tests
- Primate Intelligence
- Working memory
