= Tetsuro Matsuzawa =

Japanese primatologist

- 松沢 哲郎
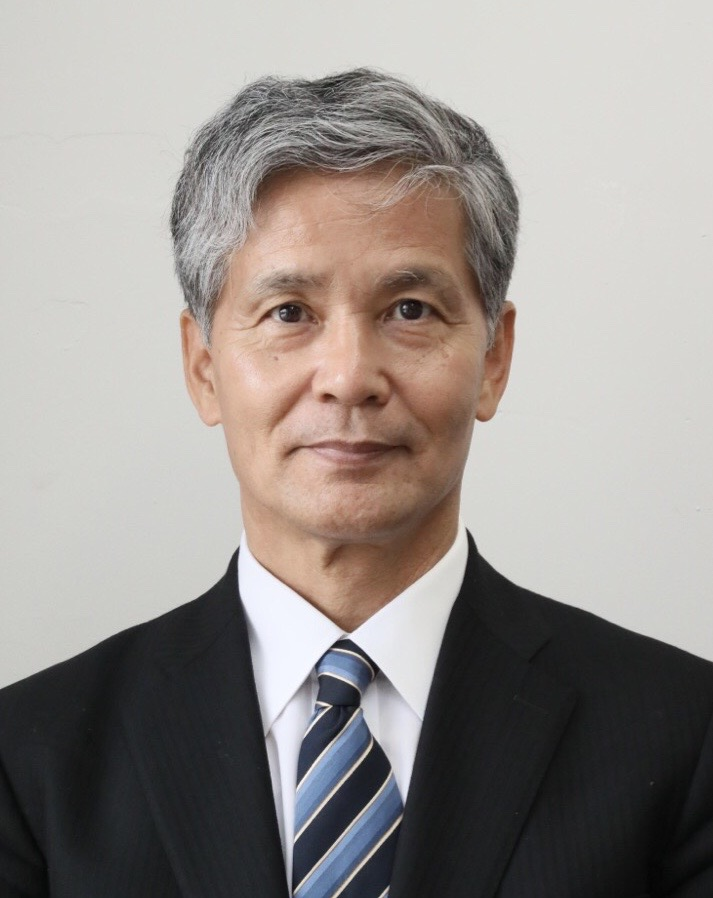
- Tetsuro Matsuzawa in 2017
- Born: October 15, 1950 (age 75); Ehime, Japan
- Education: Kyoto University
- Known for: primatology
- Awards: Jane Goodall Award in 2001
- Scientific career
- Thesis: Hierarchy of visual perception in a chimpanzee (Pan troglodytes) (1989)

Tetsuro Matsuzawa

Japanese name
- Kanji: 松沢 哲郎
- Hiragana: まつざわてつろう
Transcriptions
- Revised Hepburn: Matsuzawa Tetsurō
- Traditional Hepburn: Matsuzawa Tetsurō
- Kunrei-shiki: Matuzawa Teturô
- Nihon-shiki: Matuzawa Teturô

Tetsuro Matsuzawa (松沢 哲郎, Matsuzawa Tetsurō; born October 15, 1950) is a primatologist who was a past director of the Primate Research Institute of Kyoto University. He graduated from Kyoto University with a B.A. degree in 1974, a Psy.M. degree in 1976 and a Ph.D. degree in Science in 1989.

Matsuzawa is known for his research on chimpanzee intelligence both in the laboratory and in the wild. His laboratory work consists of the "Ai project", which focuses on the language-like skills, number-concepts, and memory ability of a female chimpanzee named Ai. Started in 1978, it is one of the longest running laboratory research projects on chimpanzee intelligence. Matsuzawa has been a part of the project since the beginning. Matsuzawa has also studied tool use in the wild chimpanzees at Bossou, Guinea, West Africa since 1986. The bossou chimpanzee community consists of about 12 individuals and has been studied by Japanese researchers for three decades. Bossou chimps are well known to use a pair of stones as hammer and anvil to crack open oil-palm nuts. Long-term research on wild chimpanzee tool use revealed interesting topics like handedness of use of a hammer, critical period of learning nut-cracking at around 3 to 5 year old, "education by master-apprenticeship" and observational learning, possession of stones, deception, new tool use like algae-scooping, use of leaves for cushions, cultural variation in adjacent communities, etc. Matsuzawa's approach to research is to synthesize the field work and the laboratory work in order to understand the nature of chimpanzees, our evolutionary neighbors.

Matsuzawa is well known for his research on chimpanzee memory, which suggests that chimpanzees outperform humans on some simple memory tasks. He has argued that this is evidence of a memorial capacity in young chimpanzees that is superior to that seen in adult humans. However, the accuracy of these findings has been disputed. A. Silberberg and D. Kearns have argued that the performance difference between human and chimpanzee trials can be explained by training effects on the tested chimpanzees. They did reach Ayumu's performance level after thousands of trials, as did humans in a subsequent study with training more closely matching that of the chimpanzees, but only for 5 numbers whereas Ayumu effortlessly does it for 9.

In 2020, Kyoto University announced that Matsuzawa was involved in misappropriating the funding of Primate Research Institute.

== Awards ==
- Prince Chichibu Memorial Science Award in 1991
- Jane Goodall Award in 2001
- The Medal with Purple Ribbon in 2004
- Person of Cultural Merit of 2013, by the government of Japan.

== See also ==
- Human Ape, video documentary on National Geographic Channel, March 17, 2008, directed by Martin Gorst, written by Yavar Abbas
