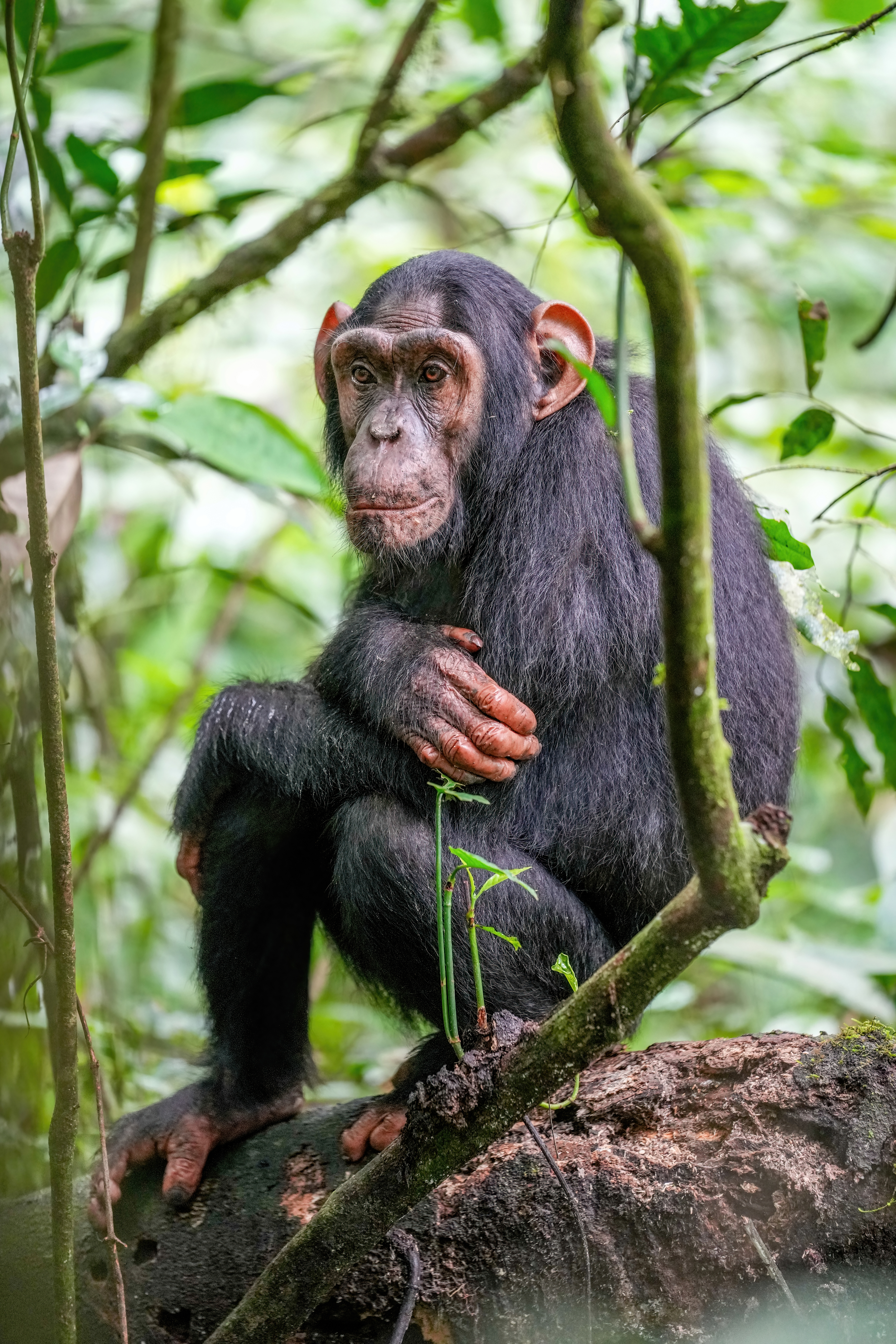
- Eastern chimpanzee in Kibale National Park, Uganda

Conservation status
- Endangered (IUCN 3.1)
- CITES Appendix I

Scientific classification
- Kingdom: Animalia
- Phylum: Chordata
- Class: Mammalia
- Order: Primates
- Superfamily: Hominoidea
- Family: Hominidae
- Genus: Pan
- Species: P. troglodytes

Binomial name
- Pan troglodytes (Blumenbach, 1775)

Subspecies
- See map
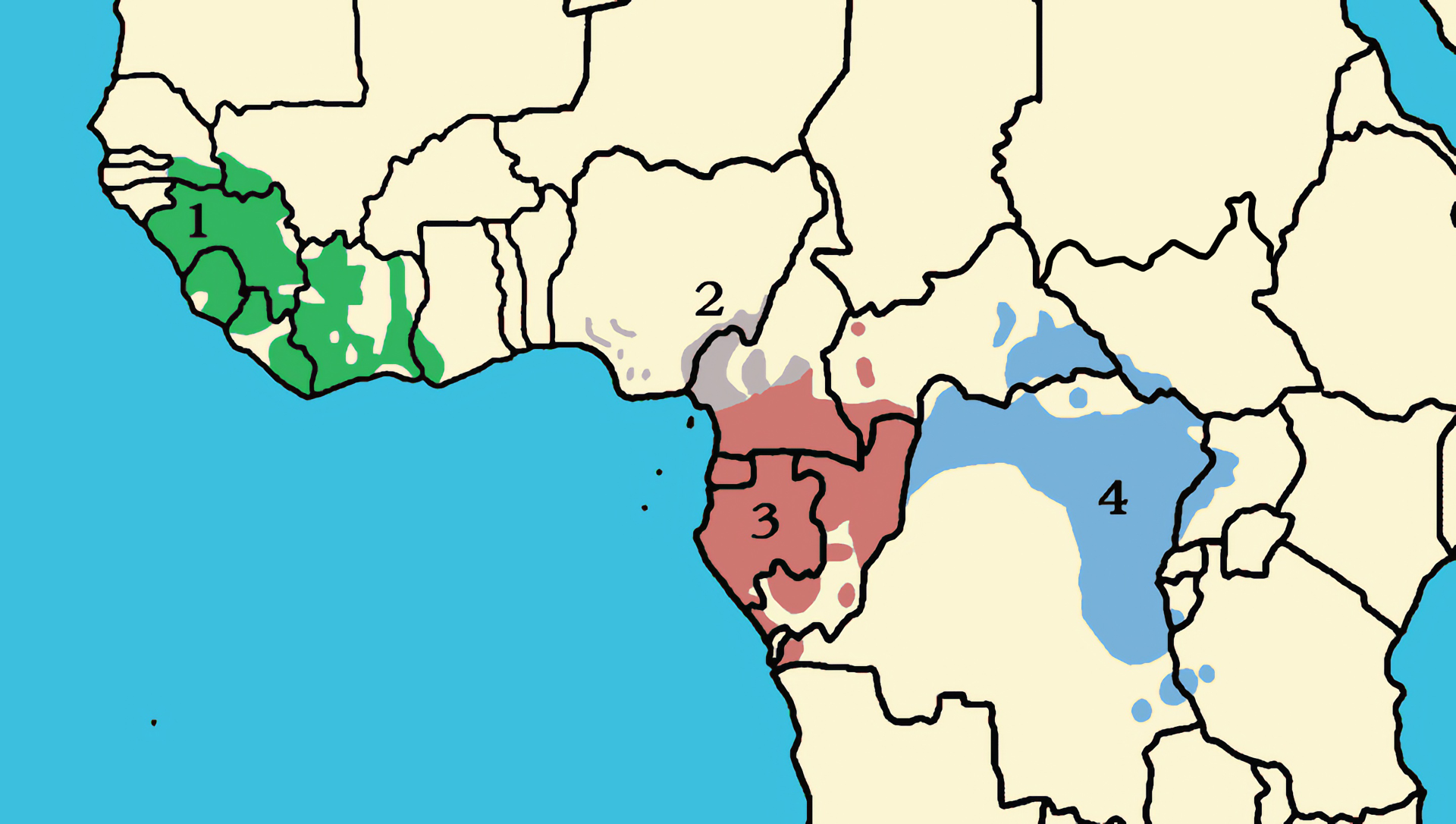
- Distribution of subspecies: 1. Pan troglodytes verus 2. P. t. ellioti 3. P. t. troglodytes 4. P. t. schweinfurthii

Synonyms
- Simia troglodytes Blumenbach, 1775; Troglodytes troglodytes (Blumenbach, 1776); Troglodytes niger E. Geoffroy, 1812; Pan niger (E. Geoffroy, 1812); Anthropopithecus troglodytes (Sutton, 1883)

= Chimpanzee =

Chimpanzee Temporal range: 4–0 Ma

Species of great ape

The chimpanzee (/ˌtʃɪmpænˈziː/; Pan troglodytes), commonly abbreviated to chimp, is a medium-sized great ape species found in the forests and savannas of equatorial Africa. It has four confirmed subspecies and a fifth proposed one. The chimpanzee shares the genus Pan with the bonobo. Evidence from fossils and DNA sequencing shows that the two species are humans' closest living relatives. The chimpanzee is bigger and more robust than the bonobo. It is covered in coarse black hair but has a bare face, fingers, toes, palms of the hands, and soles of the feet.

Chimpanzees primarily eat fruit, but will also consume other plant material, as well as insects and will even hunt smaller monkeys. The species lives in groups which can number over 200 members, although individuals travel and forage in much smaller groups during the day. They live in a strict male-dominated hierarchy, where disputes are generally settled without the need for violence. They will sometimes attack other groups for control of resources and mates. Nearly all chimpanzee populations have been recorded using tools, modifying sticks, rocks, grass and leaves and using them for hunting and acquiring honey, termites, ants, nuts and water. Gestation in the species lasts eight months. The infant is weaned at about three years old but usually maintains a close relationship with its mother for several years more. Chimpanzees communicate with a variety of vocalisations, facial expressions, gestures and body postures.

The chimpanzee is listed on the IUCN Red List as an endangered species. Between 170,000 and 300,000 individuals are estimated across its range. The main threats to chimpanzees are habitat loss, poaching, and disease. Chimpanzees appear in Western popular culture as comical figures and have featured in entertainments such as circus acts and stage shows. Although chimpanzees have been kept as pets, their strength, aggressiveness, and unpredictability makes them dangerous in this role. Some hundreds have been kept in laboratories for research, especially in the United States. Many experimental attempts have been made to teach languages such as American Sign Language to chimpanzees, though the possibility of their acquiring language has been questioned by academics such as Noam Chomsky.

== Etymology ==
The word chimpanzee was borrowed from the Kongo or Vili language. It first appeared in English in 1738, as chimpanze, glossed as meaning "mockman" in a language of "the Angolans". The spelling chimpanzee appears in a 1758 supplement to Chamber's Cyclopædia. The colloquialism "chimp" was most likely coined sometime in the late 1870s.

The genus name Pan derives from the Greek god, while the specific name troglodytes was taken from the Troglodytae, a mythical race of cave-dwellers. Troglodyte had first been proposed as the name of the genus, but a genus of wrens had already taken the name.

== Taxonomy ==
Chimpanzees are part of the Hominidae, or hominids, whose members are known as the great apes, (Note: "Great ape" is a common name rather than a taxonomic label, and there are differences in usage, even by the same author. The term may or may not include humans, as when Dawkins writes "Long before people thought in terms of evolution ... great apes were often confused with humans" and "gibbons are faithfully monogamous, unlike the great apes which are our closer relatives".) a taxonomic family of primates that includes eight extant species in four genera: Pongo (the Bornean, Sumatran and Tapanuli orangutan); Gorilla (the eastern and western gorilla); Pan (the chimpanzee and the bonobo); and Homo, of which only modern humans (Homo sapiens) remain.

In 1641, the Dutch anatomist Nicolaes Tulp used the name "orang-outang" in reference to a chimpanzee or bonobo brought to the Netherlands from Angola. Another Dutch anatomist, Peter Camper, dissected specimens from Central Africa and Southeast Asia in the 1770s, noting the differences between the African and Asian apes. The German naturalist Johann Friedrich Blumenbach classified the chimpanzee as Simia troglodytes by 1775. Another German naturalist, Lorenz Oken, coined the genus Pan in 1816. The bonobo was recognised as distinct from the chimpanzee in 1933.

=== Evolutionary history ===
Pan fossils, consisting of three teeth, were discovered in Kenya in 2005 and dated to around 500,000 years ago. They were found in the same area as Homo fossils indicating that both humans and members of the Pan clade coexisted in the East African Rift Valley during the Middle Pleistocene. The teeth show greater similarity to those of the modern chimpanzee than the bonobo.

Evolutionary biologists and paleontologists have attempted to reconstruct the chimpanzee-human last common ancestor (CHLCA). By the end of the 20th century, it was assumed that humans evolved from a chimpanzee-like ancestor. A 2015 study of Ardipithecus, an early human relative dated 4.4 million years ago (mya) and predating Australopithecus, disputed this interpretation. The study concluded that humans, chimpanzees and bonobos evolved from a generalised species that lacked the acquired traits of both genera. Subsequent studies disputed this, finding that the hand of Ardipithecus was adapted for suspension climbing and the heel for vertical climbing, much like modern African apes. Academic opinion indicates that at least 24 species of hominin have appeared after the divergence of humans from chimpanzees estimated at 7 to 10 million years ago.

- - - - Homo (human)
      - Pan
        - Pan paniscus (bonobo)
        - Pan troglodytes (chimpanzee)
    - Gorilla
  - Pongo (orangutan)

Evolutionary relationships among the great apes based on a 2025 genomic study

When describing the extinct species Sahelanthropus in 2002 as part of the Ardipithecus group, Brunet and colleagues noted the combination of ancient features not expressed in chimpanzees that would be considered archaic or derived for a species on the human line (the subtribe Hominina). These latter ancient features being bipedal locomotion and reduced canine teeth, which they interpreted as evidence of its position near the CHLCA. For example, in addition to the study of Ardipithecus in studying traits expressed and not expressed in chimpanzees, researchers such as M. Brunet have examined Sahelanthropus, the oldest Hominina, shifting the centre of origin for the clade away from East Africa and CHLCA origins. They also suggested that Sahelanthropus could be a sister taxon to the 5.5-to-4.5-million-year-old Ardipithecus and later Hominina after the separation from the chimpanzee line.

Chimpanzees and bonobos are estimated to have split from the human lineage 7–10 mya, and from each other close to 2 mya. A 2016 genetic study suggests ancient gene flow (introgression) between 200,000 and 550,000 years ago from the bonobo into the ancestors of central and eastern chimpanzees. Paleoanthropologist Gerhard Roth has noted that after the separation of the chimpanzee-bonobo line from the human-neanderthal line that the rates of growth of brain volume compared to body weight has been markedly different for these two lines, showing much sharper rate of growth for the human line rather than the chimpanzee-bonobo line.

=== Subspecies and population status ===
Four subspecies of the chimpanzee have been recognised, with the possibility of a fifth:

- Central chimpanzee or the tschego (Pan troglodytes troglodytes), found in Cameroon, the Central African Republic, Equatorial Guinea, Gabon, the Republic of the Congo, and the Democratic Republic of the Congo, with about 140,000 individuals existing in the wild.
- Western chimpanzee (P. troglodytes verus), found in Ivory Coast, Guinea, Liberia, Mali, Sierra Leone, Guinea-Bissau, Senegal, and Ghana with about 52,800 individuals still in existence.
- Nigeria-Cameroon chimpanzee (P. troglodytes ellioti (also known as P. t. vellerosus)), found in forested areas across Nigeria and Cameroon, with 6,000–9,000 individuals still in existence.
- Eastern chimpanzee (P. troglodytes schweinfurthii), found in the Central African Republic, South Sudan, the Democratic Republic of the Congo, Uganda, Rwanda, Burundi, Tanzania, and Zambia, with approximately 180,000–256,000 individuals still existing in the wild.
- Southeastern chimpanzee, P. troglodytes marungensis, in Burundi, Rwanda, Tanzania, and Uganda. Colin Groves argues that this is a subspecies, being different enough from P. t. schweinfurthii, but it is not recognised by the IUCN.

A 2013 genetic study which used samples from the four recognised subspecies found that they can be divided into two branches or clades, the Nigeria-Cameroon and Western chimpanzee forming one clade and the Central and Eastern subspecies belonging to the other. Genetic evidence suggests that chimpanzee populations were interconnected until around 500,000 years ago following climatic changes during the transition from the Pliocene to the Pleistocene.

=== Genome ===
Genomic information
- NCBI ID: GCF_028858775.2
- Ploidy: diploid
- Genome size: 3,323.27 Mb
- Number of chromosomes: 24 pairs
- UCSC Genome Browser assembly ID: panTro6

Comparisons of the chimpanzee and human genomes find that while their autosomal (non-sex) DNA differ by only 1.5% to 1.6% in one-to-one genetic code sequences, when accounting for insertions, deletions and non-coding material, a 12.5% to 13.3% difference was found. The X chromosomes were more similar while the Y chromosomes were more divergent. The two species differ in the number of chromosome pairs, with chimpanzees having 24 and humans 23; this is due to a fusion in two chromosomes during human evolution, producing human chromosome 2. A 2006 study concluded that around 6% of the gene inventory in chimpanzees and humans differ due to gene duplications and deletions, contributing to major genetic differences between the two species. In addition, a 2012 study comparing brain tissue found that chimpanzees and humans diverged significantly in the deactivating of genes.

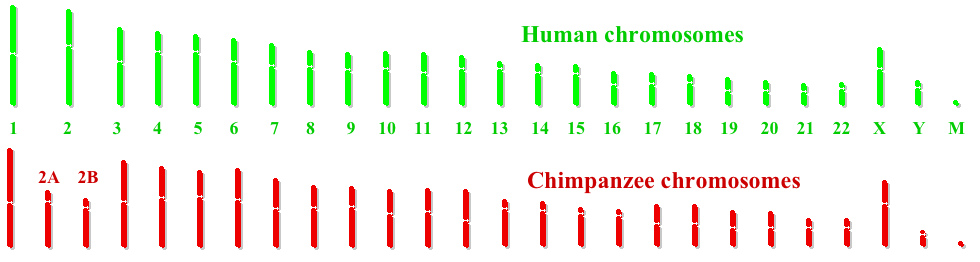
Side by side comparison of human and chimpanzee genomes. M stands for Mitochondrial DNA

== Characteristics ==
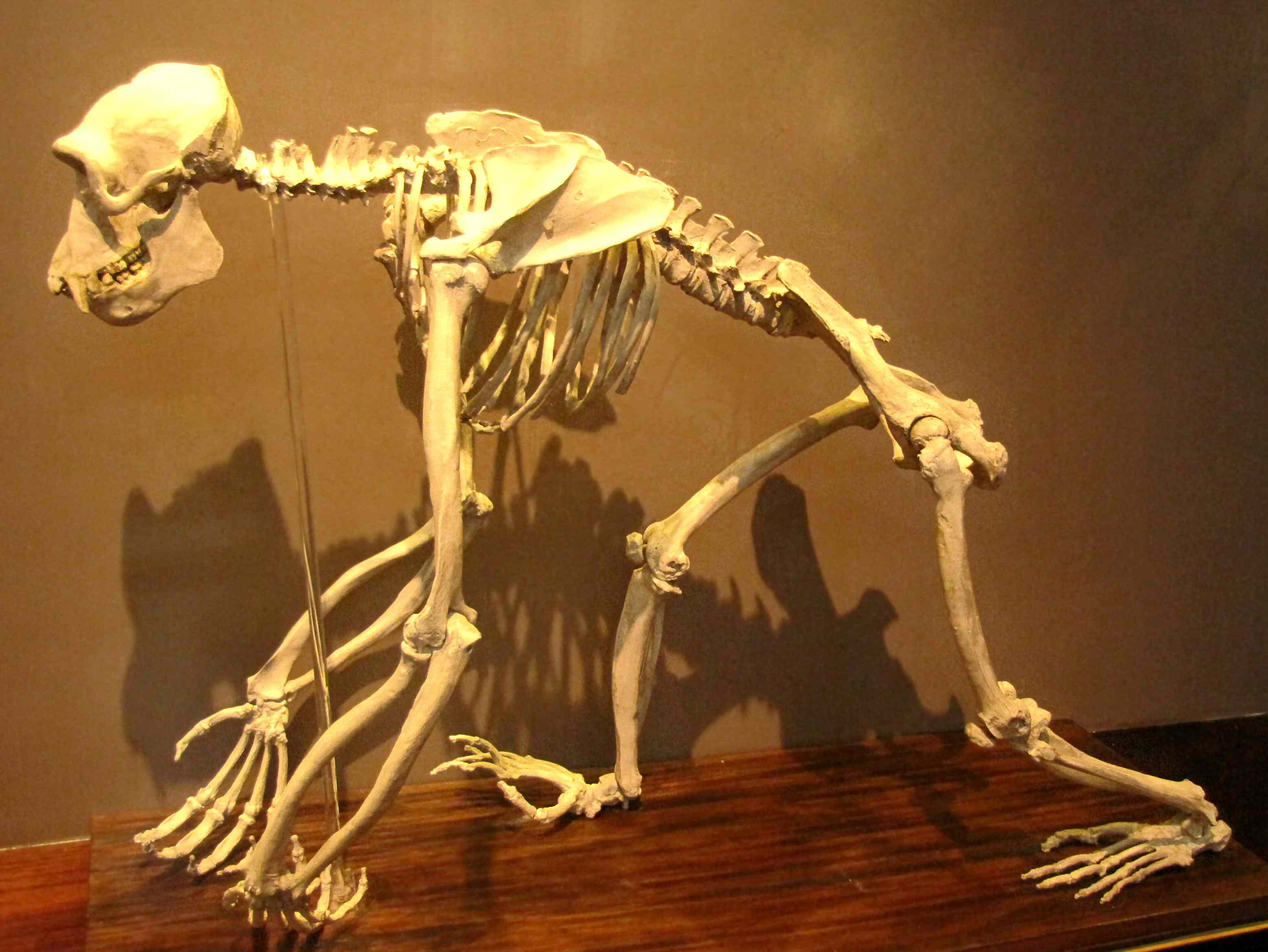
Skeleton

Adult chimpanzees have an average standing height of 150 cm (4 ft 11 in). In the wild, males weigh an average of 40 kg (88 lb), while females weigh an average of 30 kg (66 lb). In exceptional cases, certain individuals may considerably exceed these measurements, standing over 168 cm (5 ft 6 in) on two legs and weighing up to 136 kg (300 lb) in captivity. (Note: One captive male, "Kermit", attained a height of 168 cm (5 ft 6 in) and a body weight of 82 kg (181 lb) when he was 11 years old. As a fully grown adult, he weighed almost 136 kg (300 lb).) The chimpanzee is more robust than the bonobo but less than the gorilla. Bonobos are also consistently smaller. The chimpanzee has longer arms than legs, with an average arm length of 83 cm (2.72 ft). The elongated hands have long fingers with short thumbs and flat fingernails. The big toe is opposable, allowing the ape to grasp with its feet. The body or thorax is short and wide, while the hips are long with a wide top. A chimpanzee's head is rounded or flattened with a forward-projecting jaw and a pronounced brow ridge. It has forward-facing eyes, a small nose, circular non-lobed ears and a long flexible upper lip. Like all great apes, it has two incisors, one canine, two premolars, and three molars on both halves of each jaw. The canine teeth are longer in males. Chimpanzees lack the prominent sagittal crest and associated head and neck musculature of gorillas.

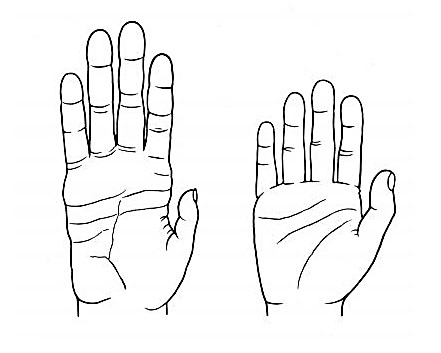
Chimpanzee hand (left) compared to human hand

Chimpanzee bodies are covered by coarse hair, except for the face, ears, fingers, toes, palms of the hands, and soles of the feet. Chimpanzees lose more hair as they age and develop bald spots. While normally black, chimpanzee hair can also be shades of brown or ginger. As they get older, white or grey patches may appear. The skin underneath the hair is white, while exposed areas may be white or white with some black pigment depending on the subspecies. The skin can become darker with age and female skin gets pinker when sexually receptive. Like bonobos, male chimpanzees have a long slender penis with a small bone, but no glans. Males also have large testicles for sperm competition in their promiscuous mating system.

Chimpanzees are adapted for both arboreal (trees) and terrestrial (ground) locomotion. Arboreal locomotion consists of vertical climbing and swinging with the arms. On the ground, chimpanzees move both bipedally (on two legs) and quadrupedally (on all four limbs), which differ little in physical and energetic demands. As with bonobos and gorillas, chimpanzees move quadrupedally by knuckle-walking, which probably evolved independently in Pan and Gorilla. Their muscles are 50% stronger per weight than those of humans due to higher content of fast twitch muscle fibres, one of the chimpanzee's adaptations for climbing and swinging. The chimpanzee brain is around 66% smaller than that of a human. The two species show differences in brain asymmetry; with chimpanzee brains being asymmetrical towards regions of perceptual and communicative skills, while those of humans are asymmetrical in favour of regions for higher cognitive abilities. The chimpanzee brain contains equivalents of both Broca's area and Wernicke's area, regions that process language in humans.

== Ecology ==
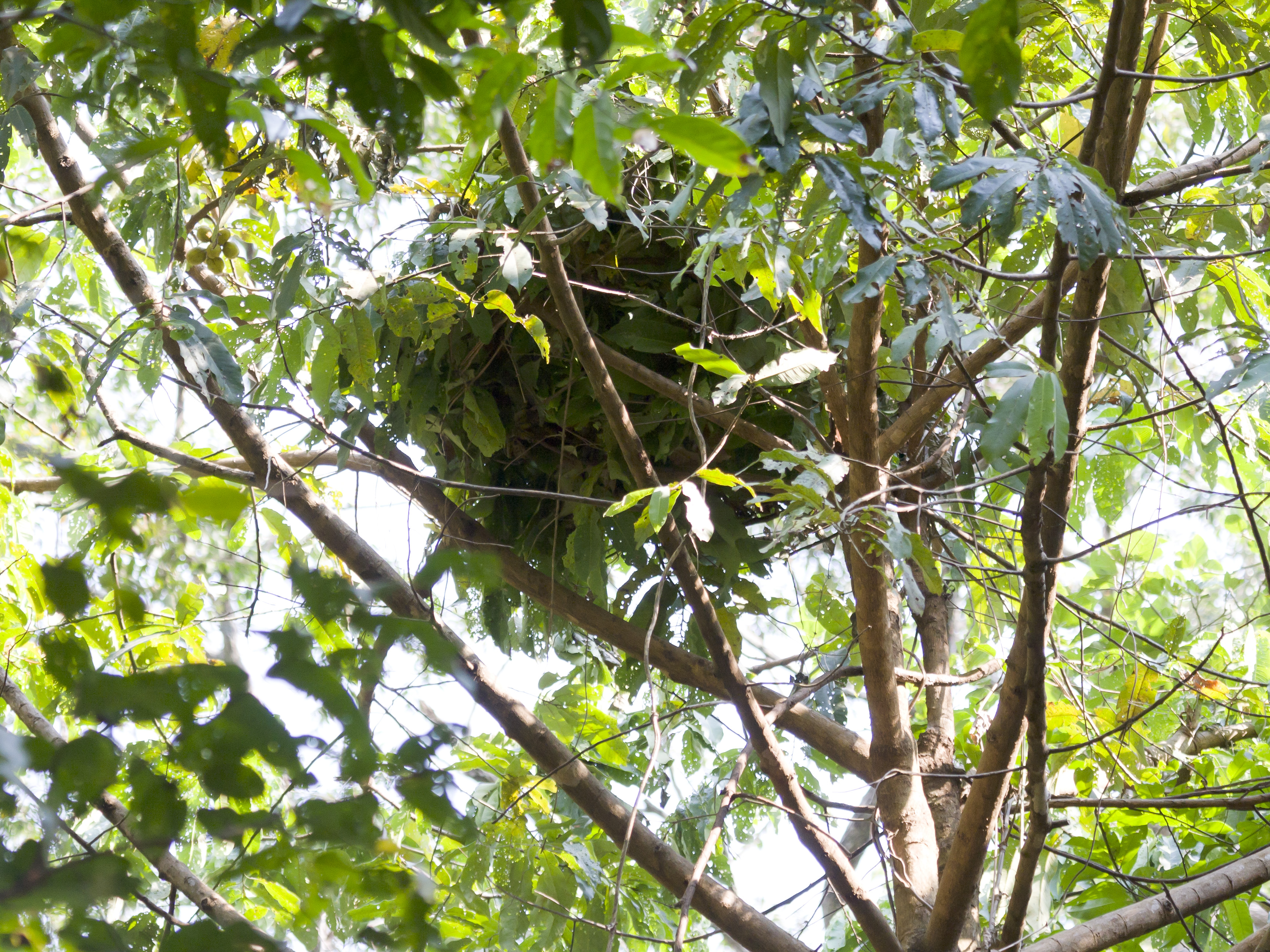
Overnight nest in a tree

The chimpanzee can adapt to a variety of habitats, including rainforests, montane forest, swamp forest, savannas and dry woodlands. In Gombe, the chimpanzee uses semideciduous and evergreen forest as well as open woodland. At Bossou, they use forests, savannas and cultivated areas. Chimpanzees are active during the day, with feeding taking a significant portion of their activities. They can repeatedly find food within their range due to advanced cognitive maps. The apes eat for around two hours after they wake in the morning while midday is spent traveling and resting. After more foraging later in the afternoon, they begin to build nests in the trees for sleeping during the night. A sleeping nest is usually used for one night, but old ones are occasionally reused. Chimpanzees may sleep alone or in groups.

Chimpanzees do not directly compete with gorillas in areas where they overlap. At Lopé National Park, gorillas and chimpanzees both will consume fruit when it is abundant, but when it is scarce gorillas eat more vegetation while chimpanzees continue to consume fruit. In addition, gorillas are not as adept at using tools to feed on insects as chimpanzees. While their diets overlap, the two apes also feed on different species, whether fruit or insects. Interactions between them can range from friendly and even stable social pairing, to aggression and even predation of infants on the part of chimpanzees.

=== Diet ===
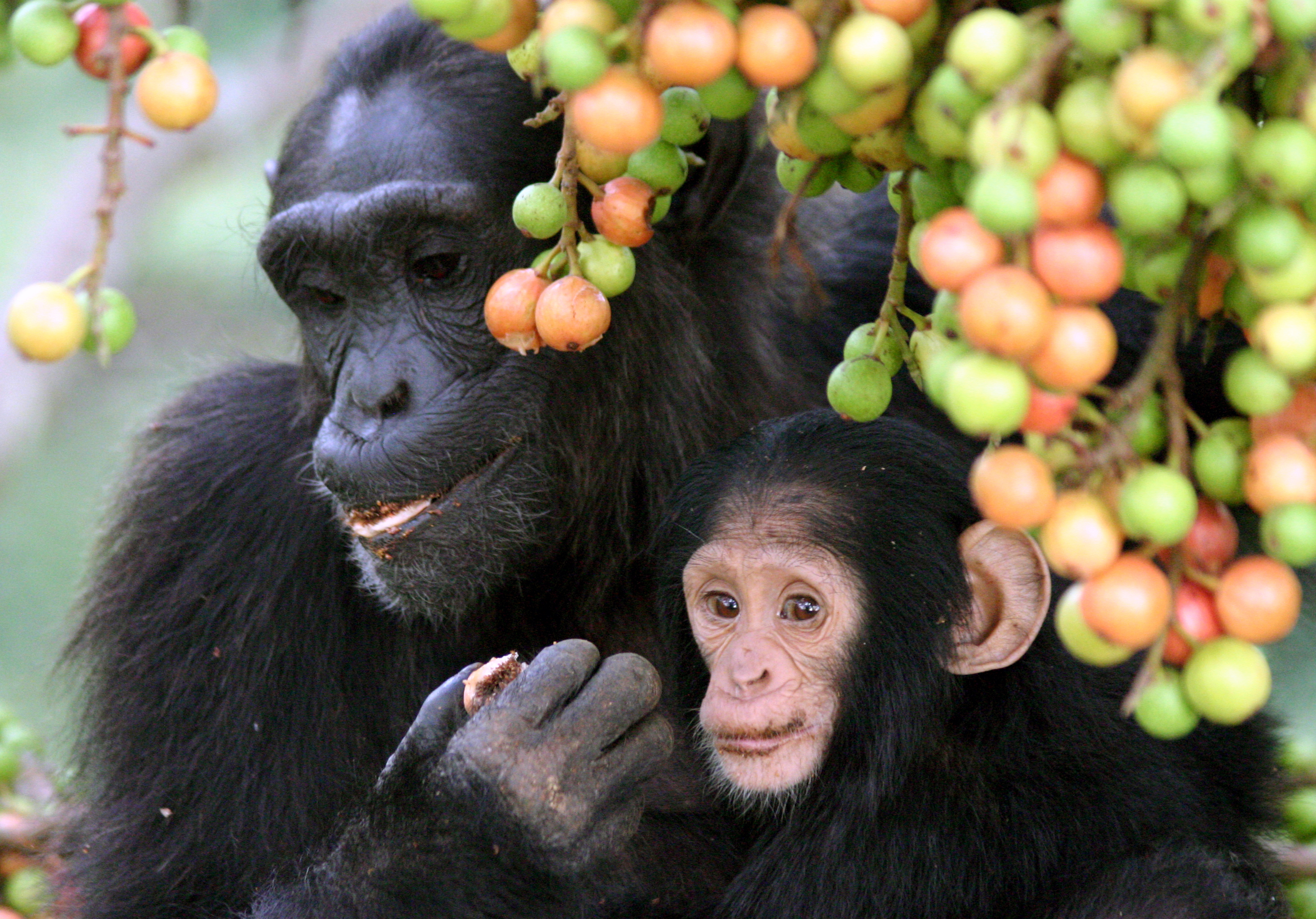
A mother with young eating Ficus fruit in Kibale National Park, Uganda

The chimpanzee primarily eats fruit, but also consumes leaves, seeds, blossoms, stems, pith, bark, and resin. A study in Budongo Forest, Uganda found that chimpanzees concentrate the majority of their feeding time (64.5%) on fruits (84.6% of which being ripe), particularly those from two species of Ficus, Maesopsis eminii, and Celtis gomphophylla. In addition, 19% of feeding time was spent on arboreal leaves, mostly Broussonetia papyrifera and Celtis mildbraedii. The consumption of woody material such as bark appears to have a supplemental or medicinal function rather than just being an alternative food source during scarcity. In savanna habitats, chimpanzees have adapted to eating seeds and unripe fruits. The chimpanzee also eats non-plant material like honey, soil, clay, insects, birds and their eggs, and small to medium-sized mammals, including other primates. Insect species consumed include the weaver ant species Oecophylla longinoda, termites of the genus Macrotermes, and honey bees.

When in large groups, chimpanzees can prey on mammals which include monkeys like the Western red colobus, the king colobus and baboons, non-simian primates like galagos, rodents like mice and squirrels and hooved mammals like bushpigs, blue duikers, sunis and bushbuck fawns. The red colobus is the most common prey. Meat may have some importance in providing nutrients that help in brain development. Chimpanzees are more likely to hunt when fruit is more abundant, since more individuals aggregate during this time and large groups increase hunting success.

=== Mortality and health ===
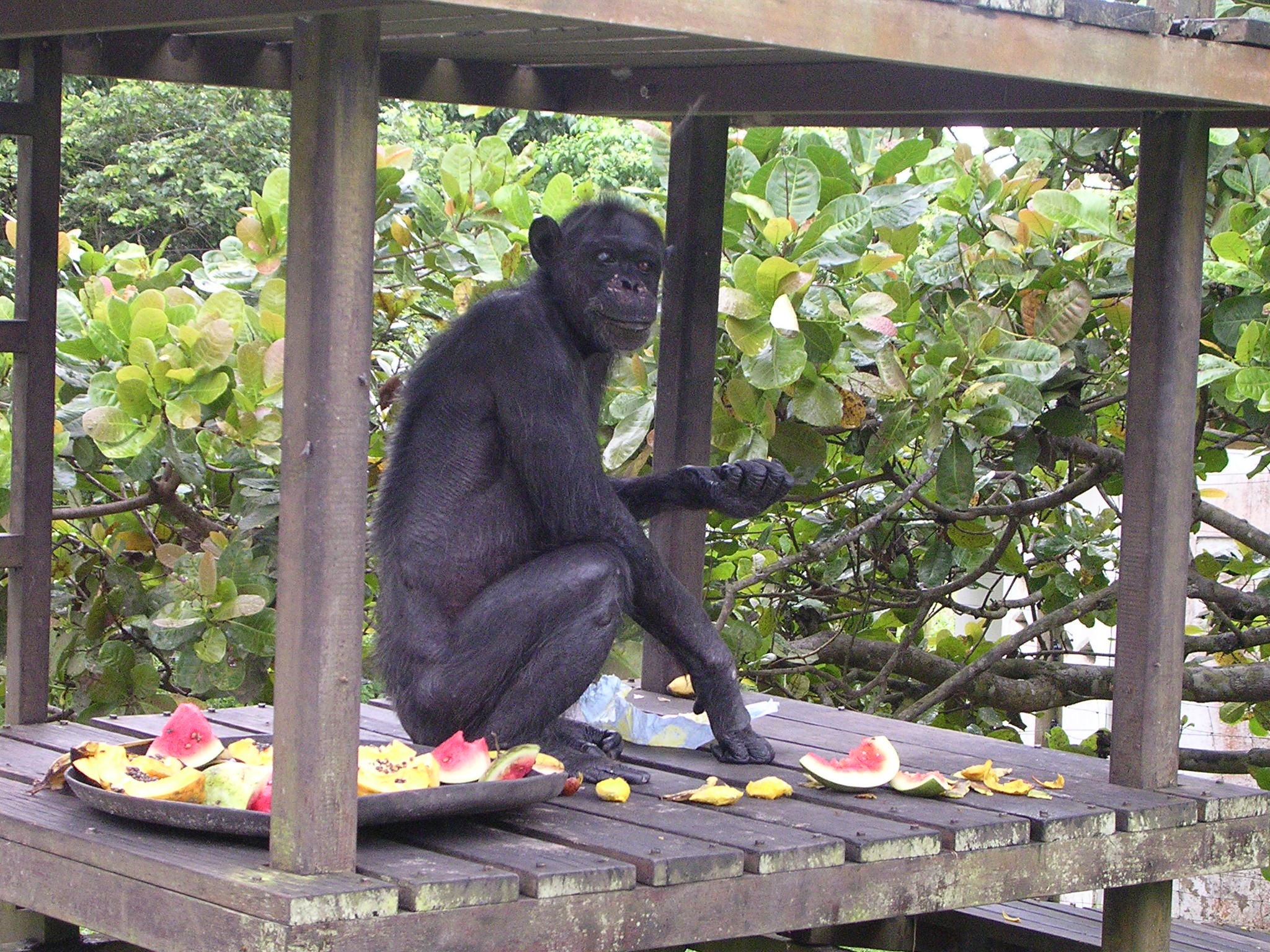
62-year-old Chimpanzee named "Gregoire" on 9 December 2006, born in 1944 (Jane Goodall sanctuary of Tchimpounga, Republic of the Congo)

A 2017 study of the Ngogo community in Kibale National Park found that, when environmental conditions are favourable, chimpanzees have an average life expectancy of nearly 33 years, which is within the expectancy of human hunter-gatherers (27–37 years). By contrast, the Kanyawara chimpanzees, which also live in Kibale, have an average life expectancy of 20 years. The life expectancy of chimpanzees at Gombe and Taï average 18 and 13 years respectively. Captive chimpanzees have been recorded to live over 60 years and wild ones can possibly live as long. One study of the Kasekela chimpanzee community in Gombe estimated that around 58% of deaths (with known causes) were due to disease, while around 20% were caused by other chimpanzees.

Leopards prey on chimpanzees in some areas. It is possible that some mortality caused by leopards can be attributed to individuals that have specialised in killing chimpanzees. Chimpanzees may react to a leopard's presence with loud vocalising, vegetation shaking, throwing objects and climbing up trees. The apes have been recorded confronting and harassing leopards, stealing their kills and even killing cubs. At least four chimpanzees may fallen prey to lions at Mahale Mountains National Park and the larger group sizes of savanna chimpanzees may have developed as a response to threats from these big cats. Chimpanzees are recorded to react to lions by retreating up trees, shaking branches, vocalising or even silence.

Less than half the parasite and microbial species that infest chimpanzees also infest humans, however, humans show much more overlap with omnivorous, savanna-dwelling baboons. The chimpanzee is host to the louse species Pediculus schaeffi, a close relative of P. humanus, which lives in human head and body hair. By contrast, the human pubic louse Pthirus pubis is closely related to Pthirus gorillae, which infests gorillas. The mite species Sarcoptes scabiei may infest chimpanzees and cause mange. A 2023 study of chimpanzees in Kibale identified seven species of ticks as parasites, the most numerous being the species Haemaphysalis parmata. A 2017 study of gastrointestinal parasites of wild chimpanzees in degraded forest in Uganda found nine species of protozoa, five nematodes, one cestode, and one trematode. The most prevalent species was the protozoan Troglodytella abrassarti. The bacteria species Streptococcus pneumoniae and S. pyogenes cause respiratory diseases in chimpanzees, which are recorded to be the most common cause of disease related deaths in the Kasekela community. A study found that chimpanzee nests contain fewer skin bacteria and external parasites, but higher microbial diversity from the surrounding environment, compared to human beds.

== Behaviour ==
=== Group structure ===
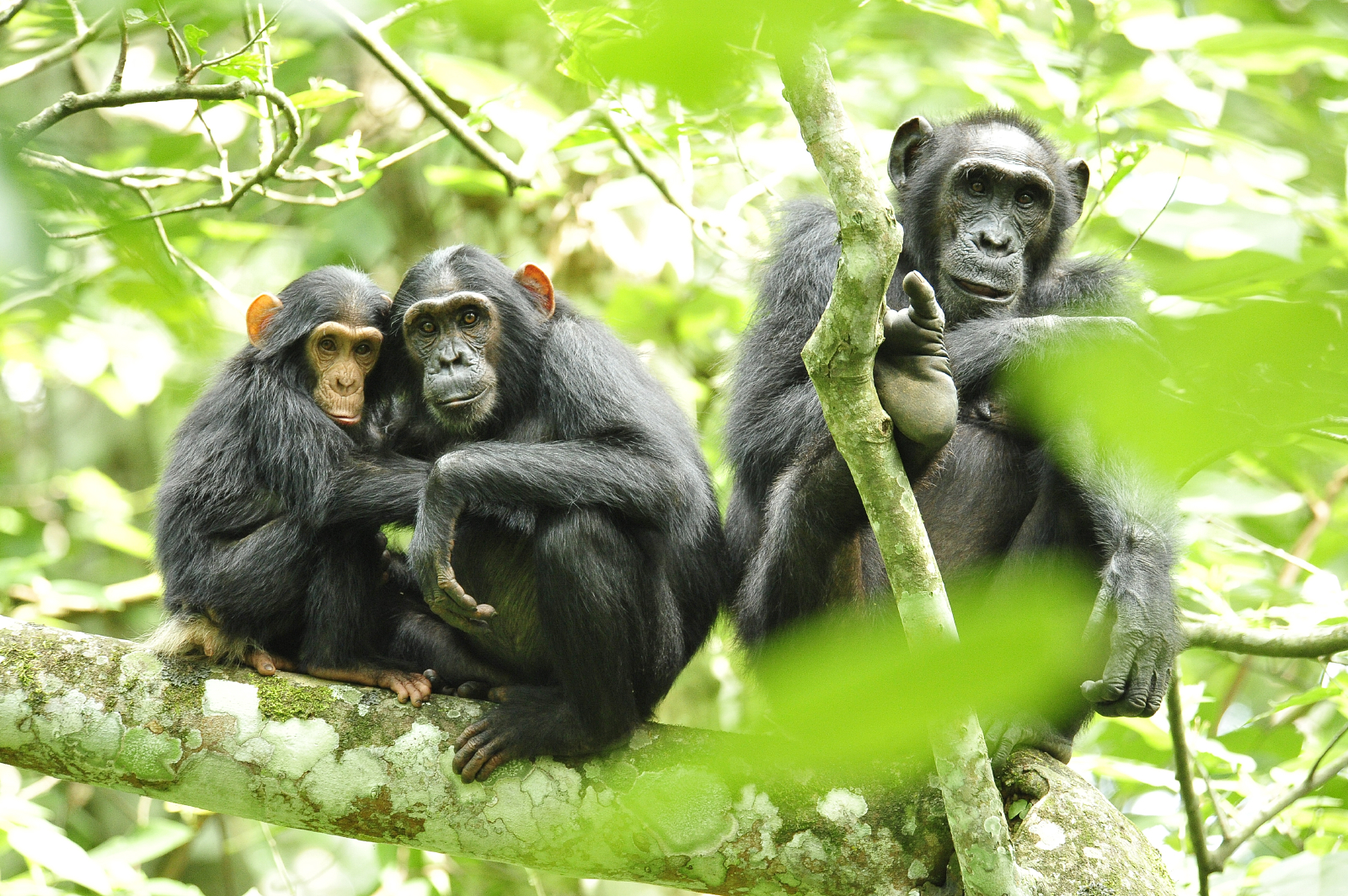
Group in Uganda

Chimpanzees live in communities within home ranges which average 4 km (2.5 mi) in diameter. Communities can reach over 200 members, though the apes spend most of their time traveling in small, temporary groups consisting of six or fewer individuals. These groups may consist of any combination of age and sexes. Both males and females sometimes travel alone. Chimpanzee communities are considered fission–fusion societies, as individuals consistently leave and join groups. At the core of these social structures are males, who are the more dominant sex and remain in their natal communities, while females generally emigrate at adolescence. Males and sexually receptive females are the most social members of a community. Males appear to be social with individuals of any sex or class, while receptive females typically avoid each other and non-receptive females prefer to associate amongst themselves.

Male chimpanzees compete aggressively and exist in a linear dominance hierarchy. Top-ranking males tend to be aggressive even when there is dominance stability in the hierarchy. This is probably due to the chimpanzee's fission-fusion society, with male chimpanzees leaving groups and returning after extended periods of time. With this, a dominant male is unsure if any changes have occurred in his absence and must re-establish his dominance. Thus, a large amount of aggression occurs within five to fifteen minutes after a reunion. During these encounters, displays of low level aggression are generally preferred over physical attacks of high aggression. Males maintain and improve their social ranks by forming coalitions, which have been characterised as "exploitative" and based on an individual's ability and readiness, in certain situations, to help achieve favourable outcomes during conflicts. Being in a coalition allows males to dominate a third individual when they could not by themselves, as politically apt chimpanzees can exert power over aggressive interactions regardless of their rank. Coalitions can also give an individual male the confidence to challenge a dominant or larger male. The more allies a male has, the better his chance of becoming dominant. However, most changes in hierarchical rank are caused by one-on-one interactions, usually involving low-level aggressive displays.

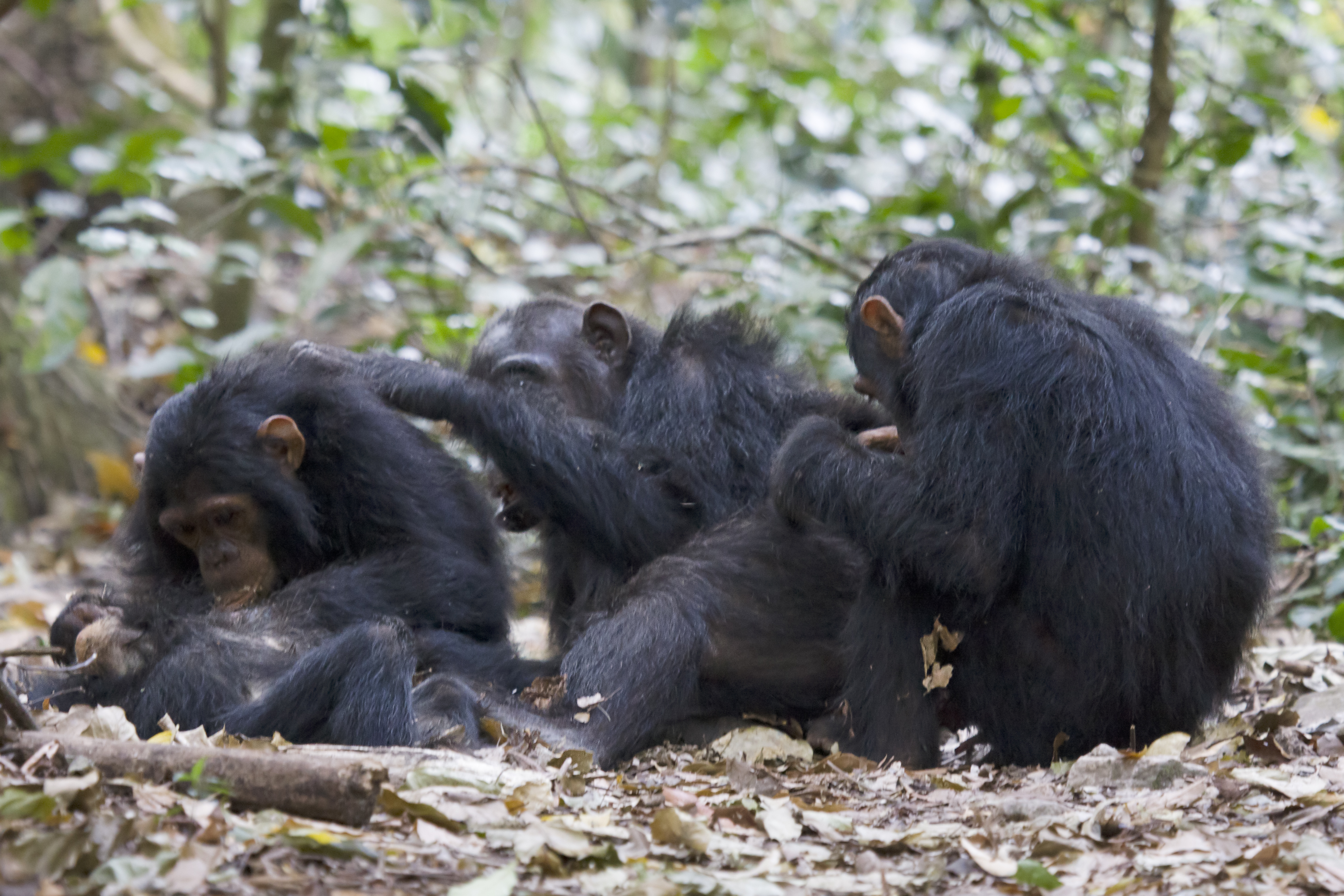
Mutual grooming, removing lice

Low-ranking males may switch sides in disputes between more dominant individuals. A subordinate male can gain increased sexual opportunities as the competing dominants may allow him to mate if they both need his support. Social hierarchies among adult females tend to be less clearly defined. Nevertheless, the status of an adult female may be important for her offspring. Females in Taï have also been recorded to form alliances. While chimpanzee social structure is often referred to as patriarchal, it is not entirely unheard of for females to forge coalitions against males. There is also at least one recorded case of females securing a dominant position over males in their respective troop, albeit in a captive environment. Social grooming appears to be important in the formation and maintenance of coalitions. It occurs more often among adult males than either between adult females or between the sexes. Males further up the hierarchy receive more grooming.

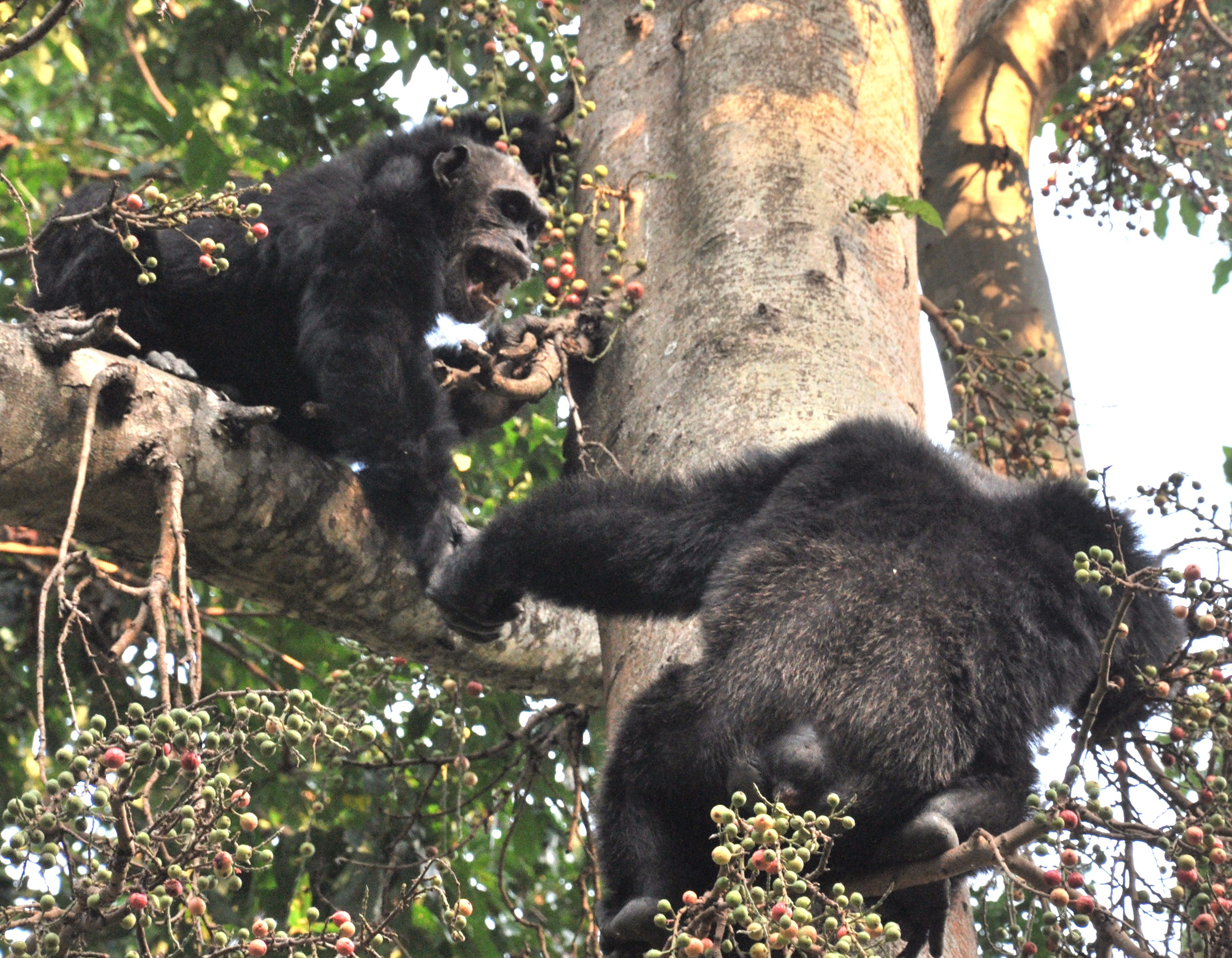
Males in Mahale National Park, Tanzania

Coalitions of adult male chimpanzees will patrol the boundaries of their home range. They will also conquer neighbouring ranges for resources and females, if the defenders are weak enough. While it was traditionally accepted that only female chimpanzees disperse and males remain in their natal troop for life, there are confirmed cases of adult males safely integrating themselves into new communities among West African chimpanzees, suggesting they are less territorial than other subspecies. West African chimpanzee males are also less aggressive with female chimpanzees in general. Unusual among animals, but similar to humans, chimpanzees within a community can become more polarized and eventually split into two groups, with one group attacking and raiding the other. The Gombe Chimpanzee War was one such conflict when a prolonged dominance struggle between dominant males in a community eventually created separate factions. This was followed by a four-year conflict (1974–1977) when one group attacked the other leading to the deaths or disappearances of members of the victim group. While chimpanzees are popularly thought of as more war-like than bonobos, primatologist Christine Webb concludes that "Through an analysis of various chimpanzee and bonobo sanctuary communities, we've found that variation within the two species is greater than differences between them". While intra-group rivalry among male chimpanzees to determine alpha-status for mating has been observed within groups, research published in 2026 in Science has extended these observations to state that such rivalry within a group between subgroups of chimpanzees could be observed as battling against each other for dominance within the group.

=== Mating and parenting ===
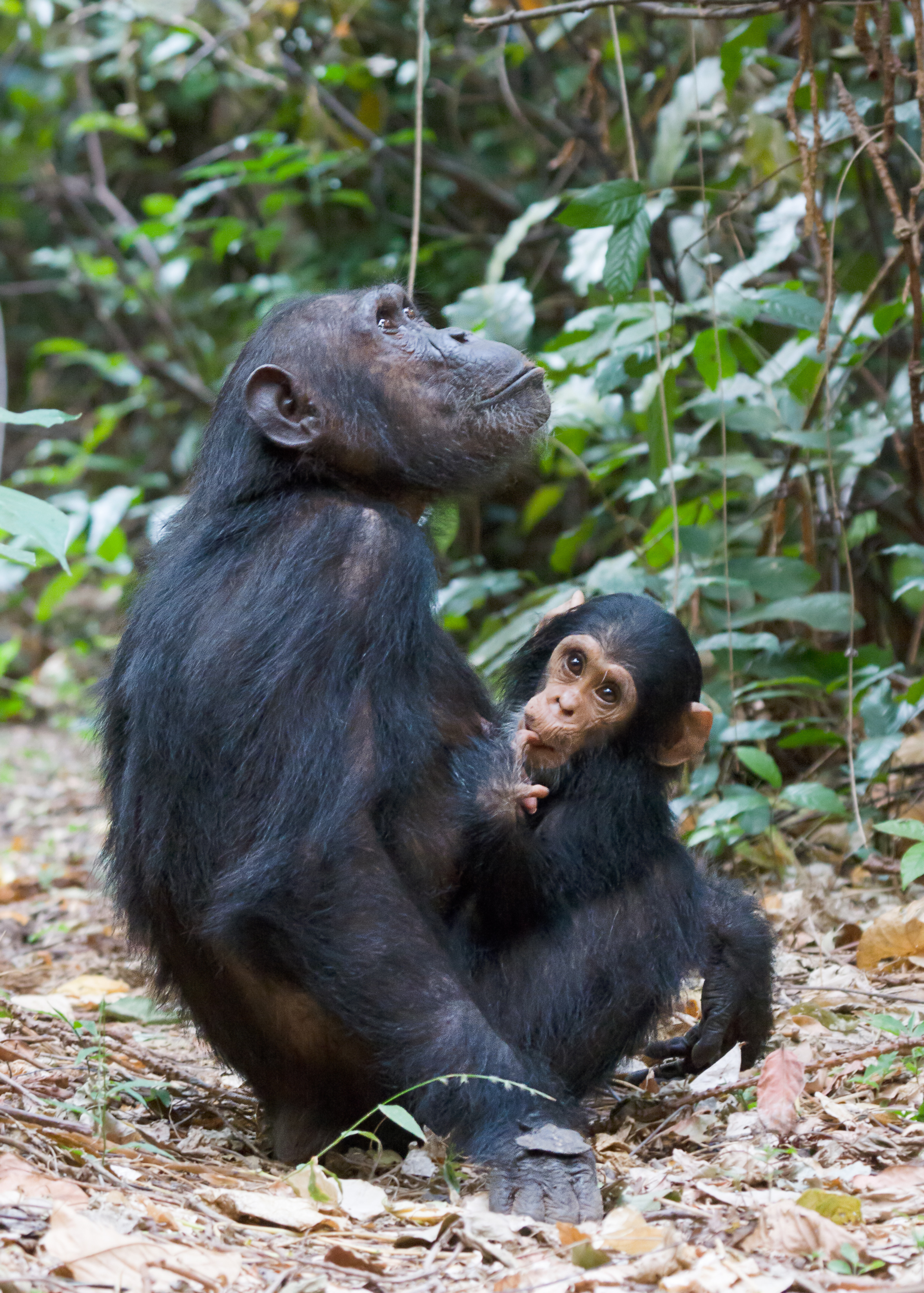
Infant and mother

Chimpanzees will mate at any time of the year, although the number of sexually receptive females increases during the dry season as opposed to the wet season. Females exhibit sexual swelling when receptive. Chimpanzees are promiscuous; females mate with several males in their community. Other forms of mating also exist. A community's dominant males sometimes defend reproductive access to females. A male and female can form a consortship and mate outside their community. In addition, females sometimes copulate with males from other communities. This gives females more mating opportunities while maintaining the support of the males in their community.

The gestation period is eight months. Mothers provide young with food, warmth, and protection, and teach them certain skills. In addition, a chimpanzee can benefit from its mother's status. Male chimpanzees continue to associate with the females they impregnated and interact with and support their offspring. Orphaned chimpanzees are occasionally adopted by adult males who can act as effective surrogates and tend to their needs. Infanticide has been recorded in chimpanzee communities in some areas, and the victims are often consumed. Male chimpanzees practice infanticide on unrelated young to shorten the interbirth intervals in the females. Females sometimes practice infanticide, but this appears to be uncommon.

Newborn chimpanzees are helpless and rely on their mothers for support, being in physical contact with them around 80% of the time. Wild chimpanzees are seen to exhibit both "secure" and "insecure" attachment styles, with the offspring looking to the mother for comfort in the former and more independent offspring in the latter. "Disorganised" attachment styles (maladaptive parent-offspring bonds caused by abuse or neglect) are only observed in captive chimpanzees raised around humans. When they reach five to seven months, infants ride on their mothers' backs and at eight months they begin to spend more time without physical contact but still within arm reach. By four to five years, chimpanzees are weaned. The juvenile stage lasts between the ages of five to seven years. During this period, chimpanzees walk and feed on their own and sleep by themselves, but remain emotionally bonded to their mothers. After this, the apes become adolescents and begin to transition into their adult roles. Females reach adulthood at around 15 years, and males a year later.

=== Communication ===
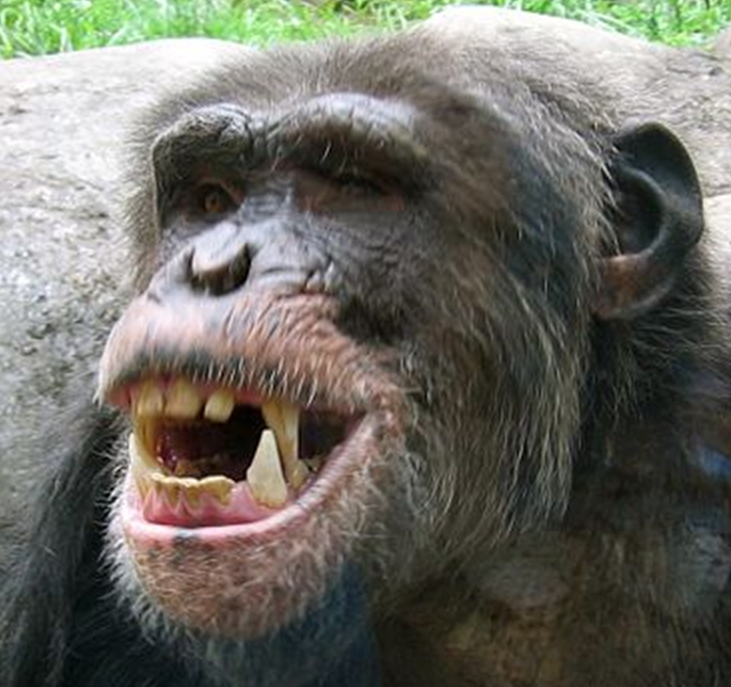
Chimpanzee fully displaying teeth, normally a sign of fear or excitement

Pant-hoot call
Pant-hoot call made by an adult male, demonstrating the introduction, build-up, climax, and let-down phases.

Chimpanzees communicate using sound, visual displays and touch. They have expressive faces that are important in close-up communications. When frightened, a "full closed grin" causes nearby individuals to be fearful, as well. Playful chimpanzees display an open-mouthed "smile". Chimpanzees may also express themselves with the "pout", which is made in distress and the "sneer", which signals alarm. When submitting to a dominant individual, a chimpanzee crunches, bobs, and reaches its hand out. When in an aggressive mode, a chimpanzee swaggers bipedally, hunched over and arms swinging, in an attempt to exaggerate its size. To ease tension, a chimpanzee may kiss another's body or put their finger or hand in their mouth. They have also been recorded to touch genitals, similar to bonobos.

Chimpanzees beat their hands and feet against the trunks of large trees, an act that is known as "drumming". They also do this when traveling, displaying, begging and when they see individuals from other communities. The most common vocalisation in chimpanzee adults is the "pant-hoot", which can be made in numerous contexts including meetings, feedings and travelling. Pant-hoots are made of four parts, starting with soft "hoos", the introduction; that gets louder and louder, the build-up; and climax into screams and sometimes barks; these die down back to soft "hoos" during the letdown phase as the call ends. Grunting is made in situations like feeding and greeting. Submissive individuals make "pant-grunts" towards their superiors. Whimpering is made by young chimpanzees as a form of begging or when lost from the group. Chimpanzees use distance calls to draw attention to danger, food sources, or other community members needing aid. "Barks" come in two forms: "short barks" which are made during hunts and "tonal barks" which are a reaction to large snakes.

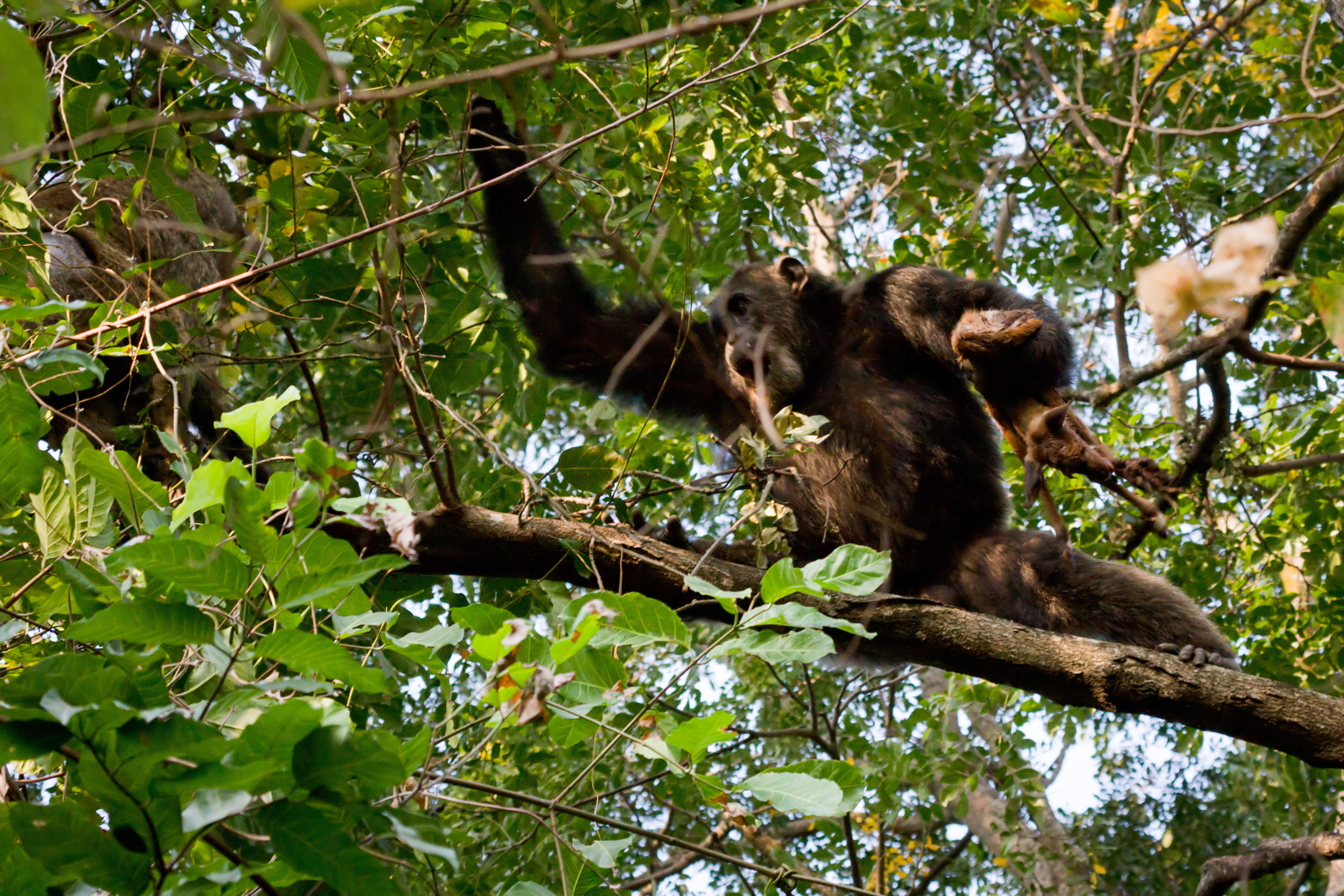
Adult male eastern chimpanzee snatches a dead bushbuck antelope from a baboon in Gombe Stream National Park.

=== Hunting ===
Chimpanzees hunt tree-dwelling monkeys in groups or alone. At Taï, members of a hunting group assume different roles. "Drivers" will herd prey into a certain direction without actually catching them. "Blockers" are stationed at the bottom of the trees and climb up to block prey that takes off in a different direction. "Chasers" will pursue and isolate a monkey while trying to catch it. Finally, "ambushers" hide and rush out when a monkey nears. At Gombe, chimpanzees may hunt alone, selecting areas with less continuous tree canopies where they can more easily corner their prey. While both adults and infants are taken, adult male colobus monkeys will attack the hunting chimpanzees. When caught and killed, the meal is distributed to all hunting party members and even bystanders.

Male chimpanzees hunt in groups more than females. Female chimpanzees tend to hunt solitarily. If a female chimpanzee were to participate in the hunting group and catch a red colobus, it would likely immediately be taken by an adult male. Female chimpanzees are estimated to hunt around 10–15% of a community's vertebrates.

== Intelligence ==
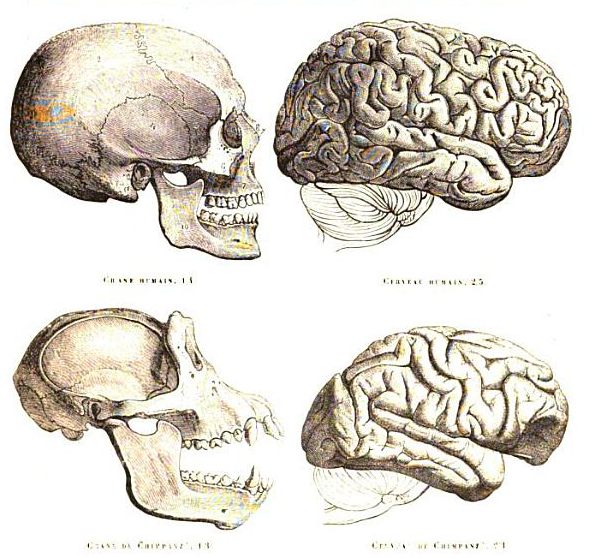
Human and chimpanzee skull and brain. Diagram by Paul Gervais from Histoire naturelle des mammifères (1854).

Chimpanzees display numerous signs of intelligence, including the ability to remember symbols, cooperate, and to use tools. They are among species that have passed the mirror test, suggesting self-awareness. In one study, two young chimpanzees showed retention of mirror self-recognition after one year without access to mirrors. Chimpanzees also display signs of culture among groups, with the learning and transmission of variations in grooming, tool use and foraging techniques leading to local traditions. A 30-year study at Kyoto University's Primate Research Institute has shown that chimpanzees are able to learn to recognise the numbers 1 to 9 and their values. The chimpanzees further show an aptitude for eidetic memory, demonstrated in experiments in which the jumbled digits are flashed onto a computer screen for less than a quarter of a second. One chimpanzee, Ayumu, was able to correctly and quickly point to the positions where they appeared in ascending order. Ayumu performed better than human adults who were given the same test.

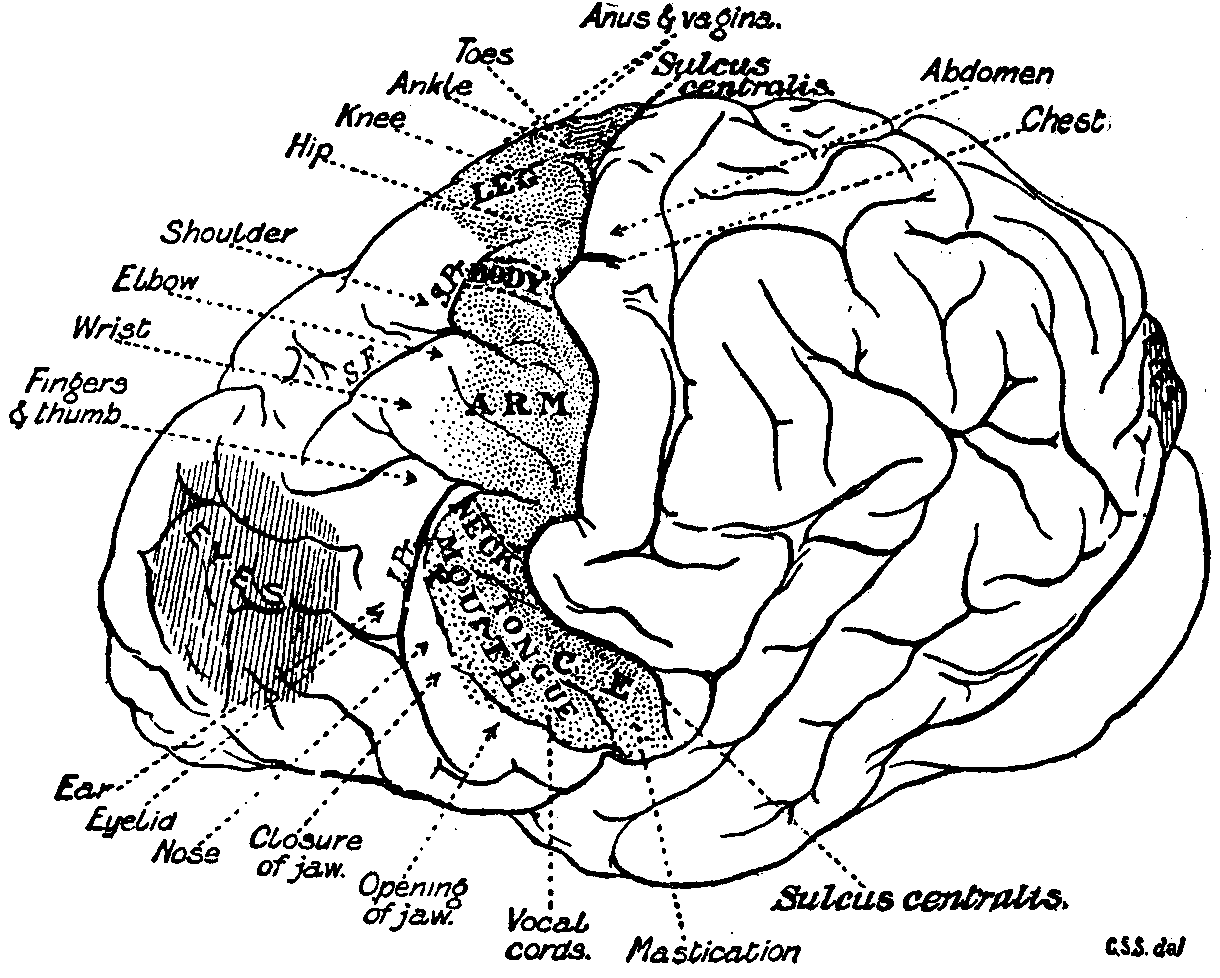
The chimpanzee brain is smaller than the human brain with comparable morphology (1911)

In controlled experiments on cooperation, chimpanzees show a basic understanding of cooperation, and recruit the best collaborators. In a group setting with a device that delivered food rewards only to cooperating chimpanzees, "cooperation initially increased, then decreased due to competition, before increasing again to the highest level through punishment and other arbitrage behaviour. Great apes exhibit laughter-like vocalisations in response to physical contact, such as wrestling, play chasing, or tickling. This is documented in wild and captive chimpanzees. Chimpanzee laughter is not readily recognisable to a such humans, because it is generated by alternating inhalations and exhalations that sound more like breathing and panting. Chimpanzee researcher Roger Fouts has stated, "The chimpanzee's laughter is rapid and breathy, whereas ours is punctuated with glottal stops." Humans and chimpanzees share similar ticklish areas of the body, such as the armpits and belly. The enjoyment of tickling in chimpanzees does not diminish with age. A useful distinction can be made between intelligence traits which are genetically inherited in chimpanzees as opposed to those traits which are developmentally acquired though cooperation; these were examined in a 2026 study suggesting that broader attention might be justified for studying traits acquired developmentally. The study concludes that the acquisition of a broad range of both overt and subtle developmental traits are related to the age of the chimpanzees observed.

A 2022 study reported that chimpanzees crush and apply insects to treat their own wounds and the wounds of other chimpanzees. Chimpanzees display different behaviour in response to a dying or dead group member. When a chimpanzee dies an unnatural death (such as a tree fall or predator attack), the other group members may act in frenzy, including vocalisations, aggressive displays, and touching of the corpse. In one case chimpanzees cared for a dying elder, and then attended and cleaned the corpse. Afterward, they avoided the spot where the elder had died, and behaved in a more subdued manner. Mothers have been reported to carry around and groom their dead infants for several days. Experimenters now and then witness behaviour that, in the absence of human-like language skills, cannot readily be reconciled with chimpanzee intelligence or theory of mind. For example, Wolfgang Köhler reported insightful behaviour in chimpanzees, but he likewise often observed that they experienced "special difficulty" in solving simple problems. Researchers also reported that, when faced with a choice between two persons, chimpanzees were just as likely to beg food from a person who could see the begging gesture as from a person who could not, thereby raising the possibility that chimpanzees may lack a theory of mind. By contrast, Hare, Call, and Tomasello found that subordinate chimpanzees were able to use the knowledge state of dominant rival chimpanzees to determine which container of hidden food they approached.

=== Tool use ===
Chimpanzees using twigs to dip for ants

Nearly all chimpanzee populations have been recorded using tools, typically made of sticks, rocks, grass, and leaves, to forage for food and water. They show evidence of planning and foresight, despite their rudimentary and simple quality. Stone tools attributed to chimpanzees due to food residue have been dated to 4,300 years ago.

In 1960, a chimpanzee from the Kasakela chimpanzee community was the first nonhuman animal reported making a tool, by modifying a twig to use as an instrument for extracting termites from their mound. Chimpanzees living in Tanzania were found to deliberately choose plants that provide materials that produce more flexible tools for termite fishing. At Taï, chimpanzees simply use their hands to extract termites. When foraging for honey, chimpanzees use longer sticks when extracting honey from the hives of dangerous African honeybees, as opposed to those of stingless bees. Chimpanzees also fish for ants using the same tactic. West African chimpanzees crack open hard nuts with stones or branches. Some pre-planning in the gathering of these tools is apparent, as they are not found together or where the nuts are collected. Both nut cracking and ant dipping are difficult to learn. Chimpanzees also use leaves as sponges or spoons to drink water.

West African chimpanzees in Senegal were found to sharpen sticks with their teeth, which were then used to spear Senegal bushbabies out of small holes in trees. An eastern chimpanzee has been observed using a modified branch as a tool to capture a squirrel. In 2020, experimental studies on captive chimpanzees have found that many of their species-typical tool-use behaviour can be individually learnt by chimpanzees. However, in comparing hypothesized early hominid making and use of stone flakes, a 2021 study on comparable abilities in chimpanzees did not find this behaviour across two populations of chimpanzees—suggesting that this behaviour is outside the chimpanzee species-typical range.

=== Speech and language ===
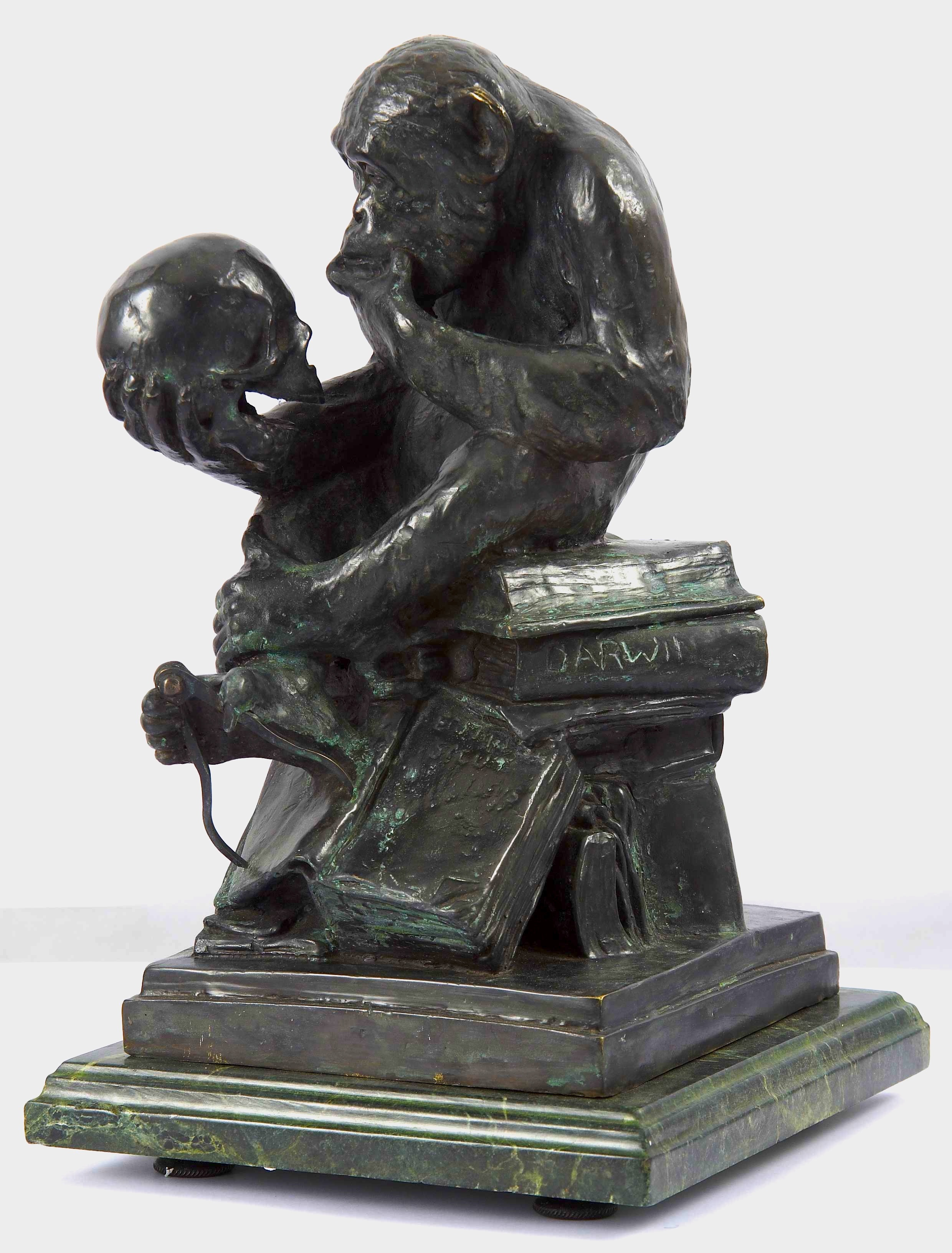
Hugo Rheinhold's Affe mit Schädel ('Ape with skull'), c. 1893

Scientists have attempted to teach human language to several species of great ape. One early attempt by Allen and Beatrix Gardner in the 1960s involved spending 51 months teaching American Sign Language to a chimpanzee named Washoe. The Gardners reported that Washoe learned 151 signs, and had spontaneously taught them to other chimpanzees, including her adopted son, Loulis. Over a longer period of time, Washoe was reported to have learned over 350 signs.

Debate is ongoing among scientists such as David Premack about chimpanzees' ability to learn language. Since the early reports on Washoe, numerous other studies have been conducted, with varying levels of success. One involved a chimpanzee jokingly named Nim Chimpsky (in allusion to the theorist of language Noam Chomsky), trained by Herbert S. Terrace of Columbia University. Although his initial reports were quite positive, in 1979, Terrace and his team, including psycholinguist Thomas Bever, re-evaluated the videotapes of Nim with his trainers, analyzing them frame by frame for signs, as well as for exact context (what was happening both before and after Nim's signs). From this, Terrace and Bever concluded that Nim's utterances could be explained merely as prompting on the part of the experimenters, as well as mistakes in reporting the data. "Much of the apes' behaviour is pure drill", he said. "Language still stands as an important definition of the human species". In this reversal, Terrace now argued Nim's use of ASL was not like human language acquisition. Nim never initiated conversations himself, rarely introduced new words, and mostly imitated what the humans did. More importantly, Nim's word strings varied in their ordering, suggesting that he was incapable of syntax. Nim's sentences also did not grow in length, unlike human children whose vocabulary size and sentence length show a strong positive correlation. Chomsky has voiced opposition to the viewpoint of Terrace and Bever based upon his theory of the inheritance of language capacity as being limited to human inheritance alone among all animals.

== Human relations ==
=== In culture and entertainment ===
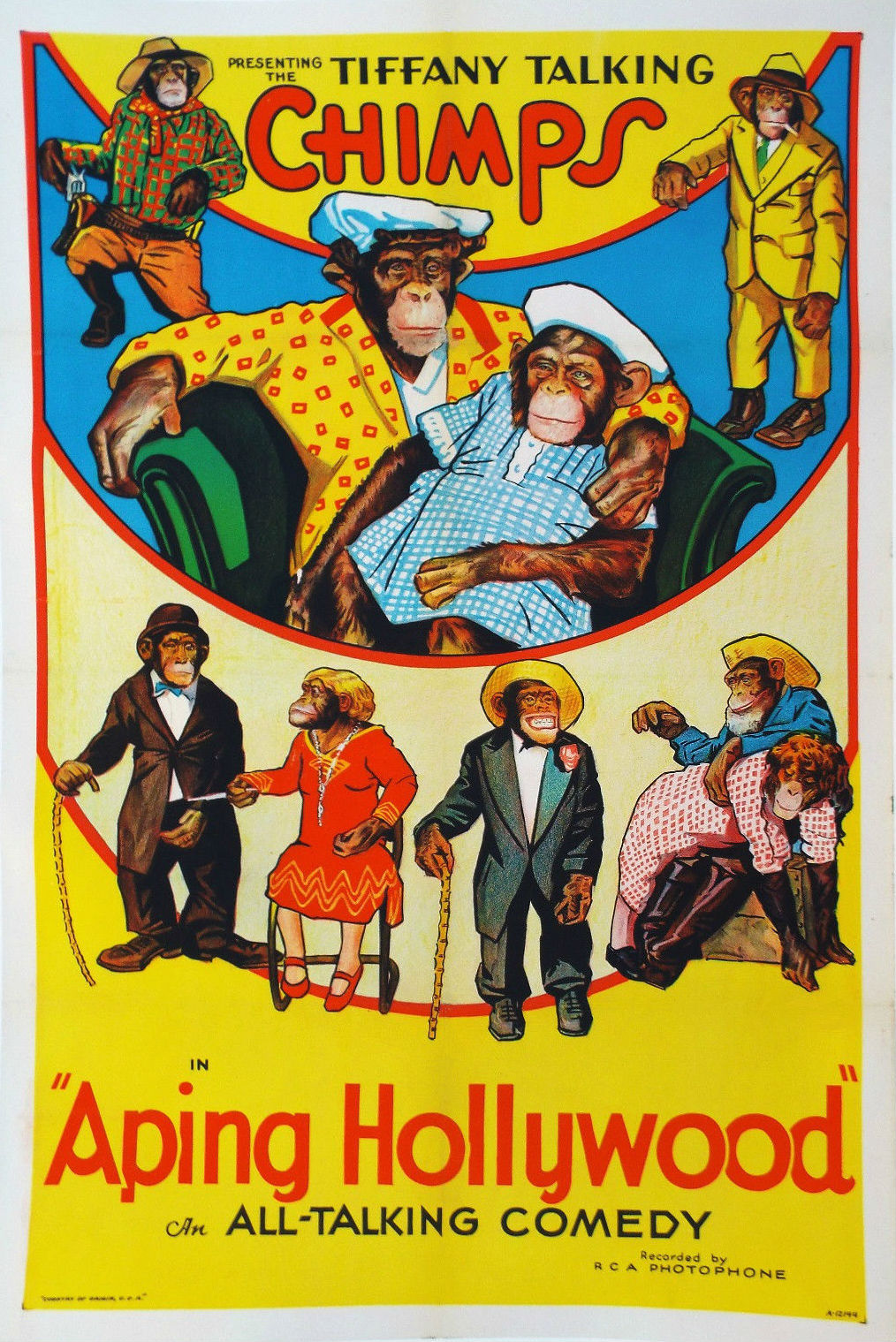
Poster for the 1931 film Aping Hollywood. Media like this relied on the novelty of performing apes to carry their gags.

The Dan people of Liberia and the Hemba people of the Congo make chimpanzee masks. Dan masks are relatively simple, and worn when warning young people about bad behaviours. The Hemba masks have a smile perceived as disturbing, and are worn at funerals during wild rituals which act to represent the "awful reality of death". The masks may also be kept at homes for protection and to promote fertility, for both humans and plants. Stories have been told of chimpanzees kidnapping and raping women.

In Western popular culture, chimpanzees have been stereotyped as childlike and comical due to their appearance and movements, which humans often find amusing. Chimpanzees in media are often sidekicks as in television series like Daktari, B. J. and the Bear and The Wild Thornberrys. They may also fill the role of human children like in the 1951 film Bedtime for Bonzo, which stars Ronald Reagan. Chimpanzee characters and actions are rarely relevant to the plot. One notable exception is Robert A. Heinlein's 1947 short story "Jerry Was a Man", which concerns a genetically enhanced and working chimpanzee suing for equal pay and benefits to his human co-workers. The 1972 film Conquest of the Planet of the Apes, the third sequel of the 1968 film Planet of the Apes, portrays a chimpanzee named Caesar leading a rebellion of apes against humanity. Entertainment acts featuring chimpanzees dressed up and acting as humans with were common in circuses, stage shows and TV shows like Lancelot Link, Secret Chimp and The Chimp Channel, the latter shows feature the apes having lip-synchronised human voices.

=== Attacks ===
While attacks by wild great apes on humans are rare, chimpanzees are the most likely culprit as they can better adapt to areas near human settlements, engage in regular aggressive behaviours, and are more likely to hunt. Wild chimpanzees are more likely to attack children and may do so whether provoked or unprovoked; the latter includes predation cases. At Bossou, Guinea, there were 11 attacks between 1995 and 2009, mostly on children but all survived. The attacks occurred near the forest edge or cultivated areas between the months of March and October as wild fruit becomes less available. Researchers have highlighted the importance of preserving habitat and food resources in areas away from where people frequent.

=== In captivity ===
Chimpanzees are more numerous in captivity than any other great ape species, with facilities in the US alone housing around 1300 individuals as of 2024. Captive chimpanzees reside in research facilities, zoos, and sanctuaries, the latter of which have been used for individuals retired from laboratories. Modern facilities try to replicate the species natural environment and stimulate their cognitive abilities using tools like feeders, termite mounds, climbable surfaces and plastic toys, as well as material to build nests. Chimpanzees are also able to bond with their human caretakers through barriers. Even with enrichments captive chimpanzees can exhibit abnormal behaviours such as eating their own faeces, plucking hair, and repetitive rocking.

Hundreds of chimpanzees have been kept in laboratories most of which either conduct or make the animals available for invasive research, defined as "inoculation with an infectious agent, surgery or biopsy conducted for the sake of research and not for the sake of the chimpanzee, and/or drug testing". Research chimpanzees tend to be used repeatedly over decades for up to 40 years, unlike the pattern of use of most laboratory animals. Two federally funded American laboratories use chimpanzees: the Yerkes National Primate Research Center at Emory University in Atlanta, Georgia, and the Southwest National Primate Center in San Antonio, Texas. Five hundred chimpanzees have been retired from laboratory use in the US and live in sanctuaries in the US or Canada. A five-year moratorium was imposed by the US National Institutes of Health in 1996, because too many chimpanzees had been bred for HIV research, and it has been extended annually since 2001. With the publication of the chimpanzee genome, plans to increase the use of chimpanzees in America were reportedly increasing in 2006, some scientists arguing that the federal moratorium on breeding chimpanzees for research should be lifted. However, in 2007, the NIH made the moratorium permanent.

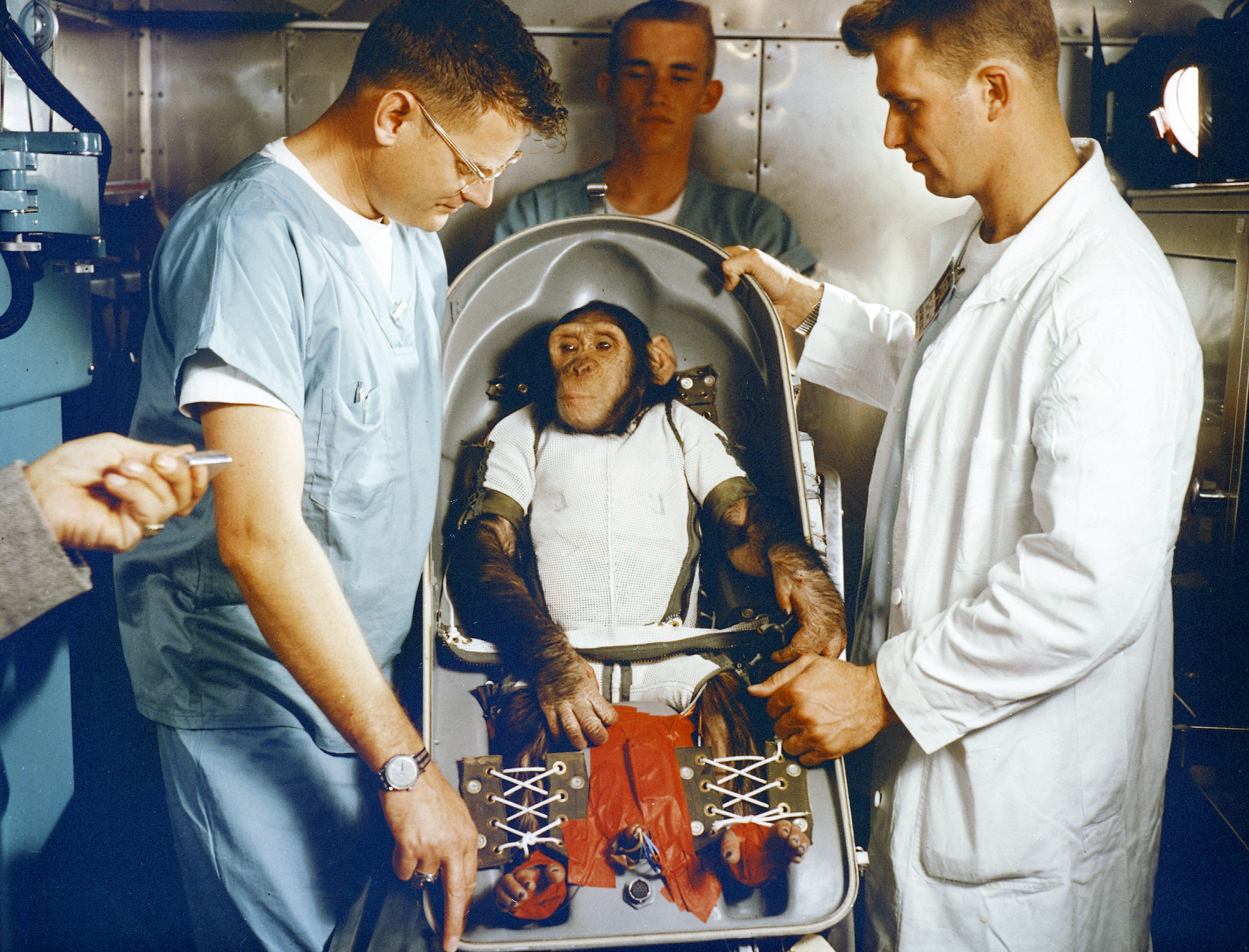
Ham, the first great ape in space, before being inserted into his Mercury-Redstone 2 capsule on 31 January 1961

Other researchers argue that chimpanzees either should not be used in research, or should be treated differently, for instance with legal status as persons. Pascal Gagneux, an evolutionary biologist and primate expert at the University of California, San Diego, argues, given chimpanzees' sense of self, tool use, and genetic similarity to human beings, studies using chimpanzees should follow the ethical guidelines used for human subjects unable to give consent. A recent study suggests chimpanzees which are retired from labs exhibit a form of post-traumatic stress disorder. Stuart Zola, director of the Yerkes laboratory, disagrees. He told National Geographic: "I don't think we should make a distinction between our obligation to treat humanely any species, whether it's a rat or a monkey or a chimpanzee. No matter how much we may wish it, chimps are not human."

As of 2025, there are no laboratories in Europe holding chimpanzees for research purposes. Historically, there was only one European laboratory, the Biomedical Primate Research Centre in Rijswijk, the Netherlands, used chimpanzees in research. It formerly held 108 chimpanzees among 1,300 non-human primates. The Dutch ministry of science decided to phase out research at the centre from 2001. Trials already under way were however allowed to run their course. As of 2021, 12 chimpanzees were held in Kyoto including the female Ai which have been studied at the Primate Research Institute of Kyoto University, Japan, formerly directed by Tetsuro Matsuzawa, since 1978. Two chimpanzees have been sent into space as NASA research subjects. Ham, the first great ape in space, was launched in the Mercury-Redstone 2 capsule on 31 January 1961, and survived the suborbital flight. Enos, the third primate to orbit Earth after Soviet cosmonauts Yuri Gagarin and Gherman Titov, flew on Mercury-Atlas 5 on 29 November of the same year. Chimpanzees have traditionally been kept as pets in a few African villages, especially in the Democratic Republic of Congo. In Virunga National Park in the east of the country, the park authorities regularly seize chimpanzees from people keeping them as pets. Although chimpanzees have been kept as pets, their strength, aggressiveness, and unpredictability makes them dangerous in this role.

=== Field study ===
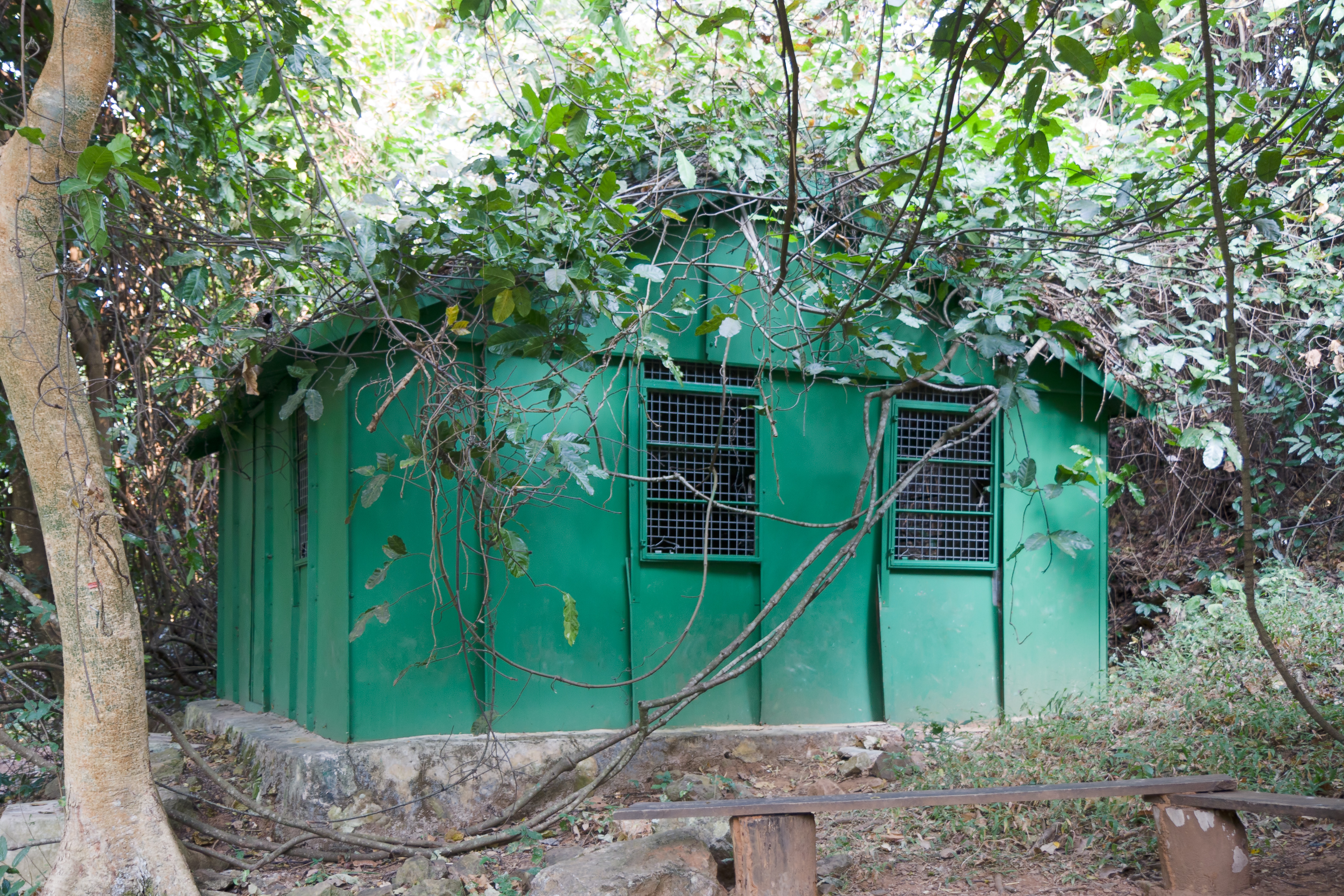
Feeding station at Gombe, where Jane Goodall used to feed and observe the chimpanzees

Jane Goodall undertook the first long-term field study of the chimpanzee, begun in Tanzania at Gombe Stream National Park in 1960. Other long-term studies begun in the 1960s include Adriaan Kortlandt's in the eastern Democratic Republic of the Congo and Toshisada Nishida's in Mahale Mountains National Park in Tanzania. Current understanding of the species' typical behaviour and social organisation has been formed largely from Goodall's ongoing 60-year Gombe research study.

Goodall researched common chimpanzee social and family life beginning with the Kasakela chimpanzee community in Gombe Stream National Park, Tanzania, in 1960, and documented much original commentary about their experienced emotional life. She found that "it isn't only human beings who have personality, who are capable of rational thought [and] emotions like joy and sorrow". She also observed behaviour often considered human, such as hugs, kisses, pats on the back, and even tickling. Goodall insisted that these gestures are evidence of "the close, supportive, affectionate bonds that develop between family members and other individuals within a community, which can persist throughout a life span of more than 50 years".

=== Human immunodeficiency virus ===
Two primary classes of human immunodeficiency virus (HIV) infect humans: HIV-1 and HIV-2. HIV-1 is the more virulent and easily transmitted, and is the source of the majority of HIV infections throughout the world; HIV-2 occurs mostly in west Africa. Both types originated in west and central Africa, jumping from other primates to humans. HIV-1 has evolved from a simian immunodeficiency virus (SIVcpz) found in the subspecies P. t. troglodytes of southern Cameroon. Kinshasa, in the Democratic Republic of Congo, has the greatest genetic diversity of HIV-1 so far discovered, suggesting the virus has been there longer than anywhere else. HIV-2 crossed species from a different strain of HIV, found in the sooty mangabey monkeys in Guinea-Bissau. Other HIV clades known to have zoonitic origin from primate SIV strains include HIV-1 subgroup O, which jumped from gorilla-endemic SIVgor and is mostly restricted to Cameroon, where it accounts for roughly 2% of HIV infections in the country. The oral polio vaccine AIDS hypothesis (OPV AIDS) is a largely discredited hypothesis which argued the AIDS pandemic originated from live polio vaccines prepared in Common chimpanzee tissue cultures, accidentally contaminated with simian immunodeficiency virus and then administered to up to one million Africans between 1957 and 1960 in experimental mass vaccination campaigns.

== Conservation ==
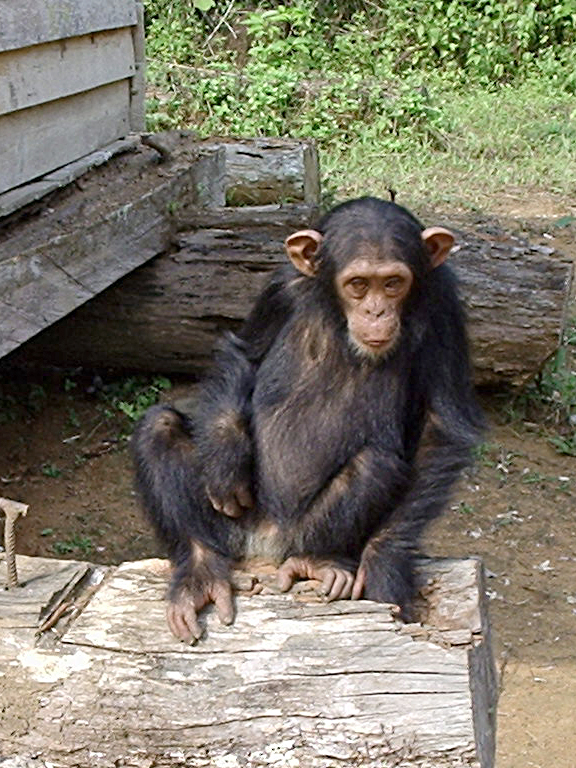
Cameroonian chimpanzee at a rescue centre after its mother was killed by poachers

The chimpanzee is on the IUCN Red List as an endangered species. Chimpanzees are legally protected across most of their range and occur both inside and outside national parks. Between 172,700 and 299,700 individuals are thought to be living in the wild, a decline from around one million chimpanzees in the early 1900s. Chimpanzees are listed in Appendix I of the Convention on International Trade in Endangered Species (CITES), meaning that commercial international trade in wild-sourced specimens is prohibited and all other international trade (including in parts and derivatives) is regulated by the CITES permitting system.

The main threats to chimpanzees are habitat destruction, poaching, and disease. Chimpanzee habitats have been limited by deforestation in both West and Central Africa. Road building has caused habitat degradation and fragmentation of chimpanzee populations and may allow poachers more access to areas that had not been seriously affected by humans. Although deforestation rates are low in western Central Africa, selective logging may take place outside national parks. Chimpanzees are a common target for poachers. In Ivory Coast, chimpanzees make up 1–3% of bushmeat sold in urban markets. They are also taken for the pet trade and are hunted for traditional medicinal purposes in some areas. Farmers sometimes kill chimpanzees that threaten their crops; others are unintentionally maimed or killed by snares meant for other animals. Infectious diseases are a main cause of death for chimpanzees. They succumb to many diseases that afflict humans because the two species are so similar. As the human population grows, so does the risk of disease transmission between humans and chimpanzees. The population of the western chimpanzee once spanned from southern Senegal all the way east to the Niger River. Today, the largest populations remaining are found in Guinea, Sierra Leone, and Liberia. The IUCN further lists the western chimpanzee as Critically Endangered on the Red List of Threatened Species. There are an estimated 21,300 to 55,600 individuals in the wild. The primary threat to the western chimpanzee is habitat loss, although it is also killed for bushmeat.

The topic of the conservation of chimpanzee through the use of extensive vaccinations and other protective medical interventions has been advocated by Jane Goodall and others. Craig Stanford's book Planet Without Apes speaks of the importance of addressing diseases significantly beyond HIV. In his Chapter 4, he covers Ebola, influenza, pneumonia, tuberculosis, and even the common cold. Transmission of Ebola is also linked to the chimpanzee's apparent appetite for monkey meat. Also relevant is Goodall's introduction of vaccines to protect and treat vulnerable chimpanzee populations in Gombe. For example, Goodall indicates five chimpanzee epidemics since the mid-twentieth century which might have been mitigated with vaccines such as the polio outbreak in 1966 which Goodall witnessed as killing one in seven of the Gombe chimpanzee population she was observing.
