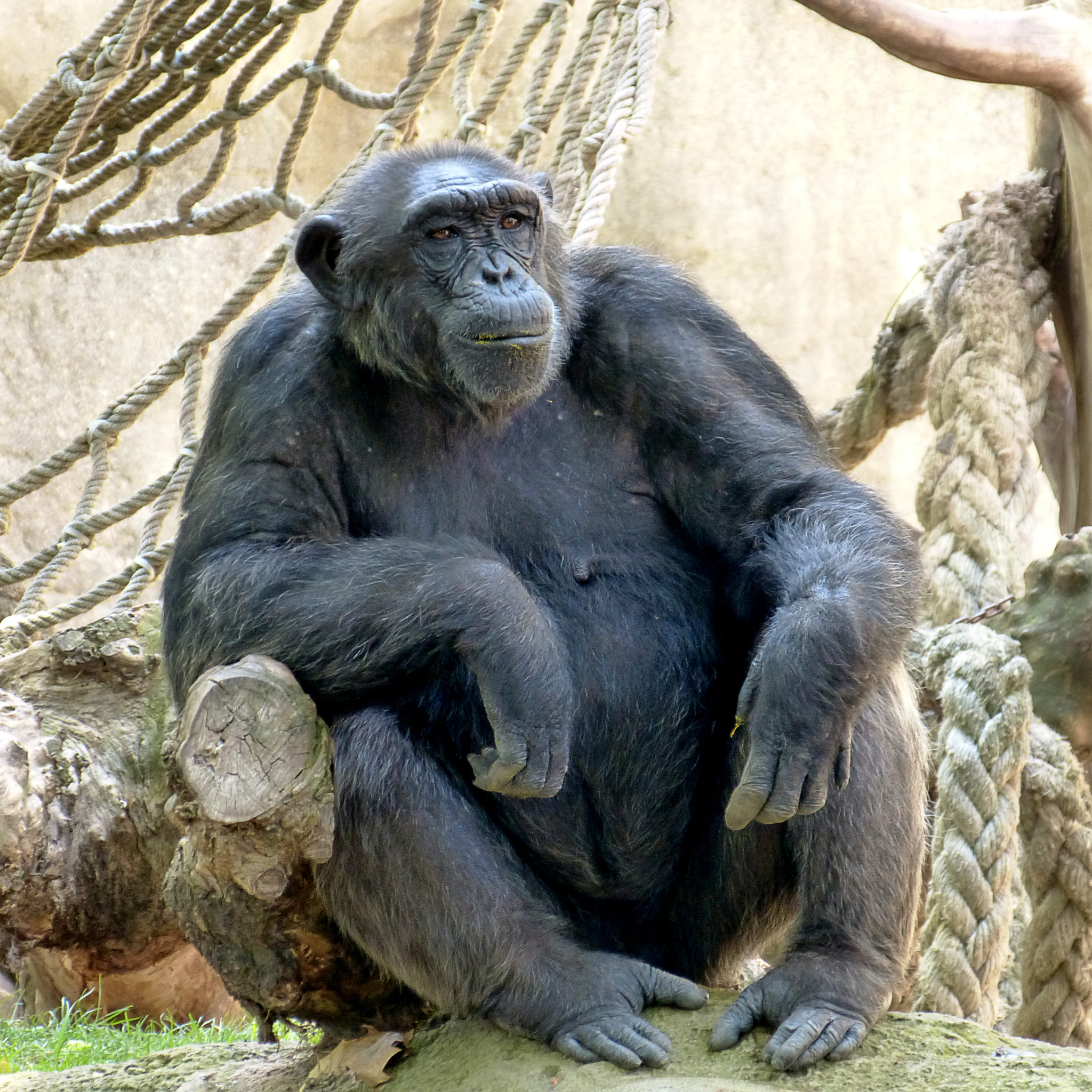

Conservation status
- Endangered (IUCN 3.1)

Scientific classification
- Kingdom: Animalia
- Phylum: Chordata
- Class: Mammalia
- Order: Primates
- Superfamily: Hominoidea
- Family: Hominidae
- Genus: Pan
- Species: P. troglodytes
- Subspecies: P. t. troglodytes

Trinomial name
- Pan troglodytes troglodytes Blumenbach, 1775
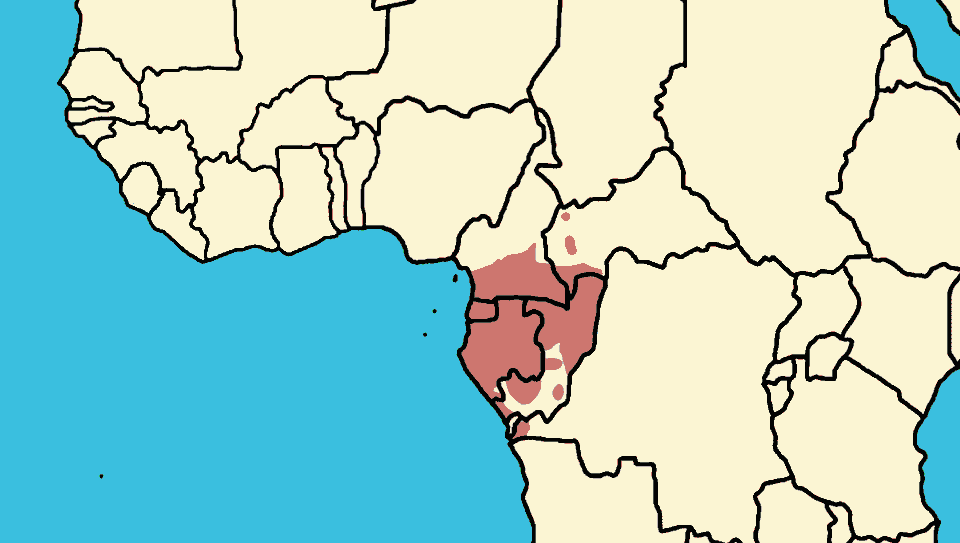

= Central chimpanzee =

Subspecies of ape

The central chimpanzee or the tschego (Pan troglodytes troglodytes) is a subspecies of chimpanzee. It can be found in Central Africa, mostly in Gabon, Cameroon, the Republic of the Congo and the Democratic Republic of the Congo.

Central chimpanzees are considered highly intelligent apes. They are also highly social living in large groups and follow a male dominant hierarchy. The activity budgets of this chimpanzee subspecies changes depending on if they were in the wild or sanctuaries. They have been observed using tools, this could be to open nuts or using twigs to gain access to ants and termites.

Central chimpanzees have a key role in the ecology of rainforests; they play an important role as seed dispersers. Even though central chimpanzees and western lowland gorillas overlap the environment in which they live in they do not compete for food as their diets are different.

According to the International Union for Conservation of Nature (IUCN), they classify the central chimpanzee as an endangered subspecies. Increasing human presence through deforestation and viruses pose great threats to them.

Diseases in central chimpanzees pose risk to the population of them this include heart issues but also different types of viruses. Central chimpanzees are strong vector carrying. These viruses spread inter species to other species and sometimes to humans. These viruses include the Ebola virus. However, there are also human immunodeficiency viruses (HIV) at the origin which have links to central chimpanzees.

== Etymology ==
Pan is derived from the Greek god of fields, groves, and wooded glens, Pan. Troglodytes is Greek for 'cave-dweller', and was coined by Johann Friedrich Blumenbach in his Handbuch der Naturgeschichte (Handbook of Natural History), published in 1779.

== Habitat ==
The central chimpanzee mainly lives in Gabon, Cameroon, and the Republic of the Congo, but also in the Central African Republic, Equatorial Guinea, the Cabinda exclave of Angola, southeast Nigeria, and possibly the coastal extension of the Democratic Republic of the Congo. Its range extends north to the Sanaga River in Cameroon, east to the Ubangi River that defines the border between the two Congos, and south to the Congo River, which defines a large part of the same border.

Central chimpanzees are found predominantly in tropical moist forest and wet savanna woodlands, as well as the forest-savanna mosaics where these two biomes meet, from sea level to 3,000 metres (9,800 ft). They tend to have larger ranges in the forest-savanna mosaics. The average range is 12.5 km^{2} (4.8 sq mi), but can vary from 5 km^{2} (1.9 sq mi) to 400 km^{2} (150 sq mi).

== Characteristics ==
The central chimpanzee averages 59.7 kilograms (132 lb) in males and 45.8 kilograms (101 lb) in females. Standing they measure on average 96 cm (38 in) for males and 80 cm (31 in) for females. Central chimpanzees usually have a lifetime in captivity of 30 to 40 years, but some have been seen to live over 50 years. In the wild, the average lifetime decreases to 15 to 25 years. A physical characteristic that distinguishes the central chimpanzee from other subspecies is that it has less hair covering its face. This is most prevalent in female central chimpanzees. The arms are also longer than those of the other subspecies, and they also have longer fingers and short thumbs. All these characteristics help the central chimpanzee be better adapted at climbing trees.

== Behaviour ==
=== Social structure ===
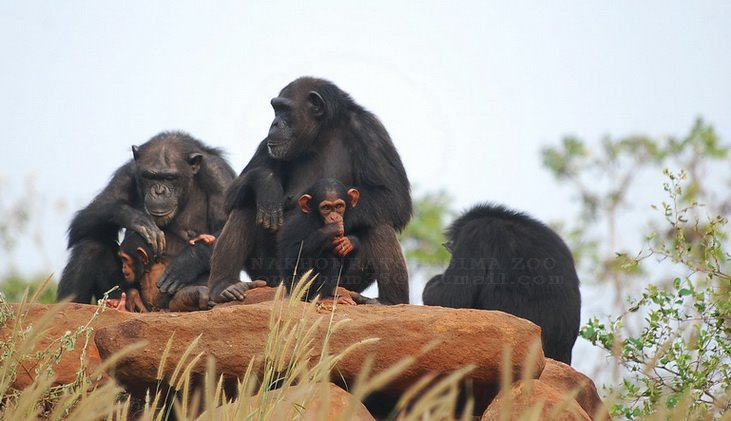
Central chimpanzees in a group

Central chimpanzees live in social groups of around 66 individuals, on average this tends to be more than the group size of western chimpanzee counterparts. It was found that chimpanzees split activity budget into four main categories. In chimpanzees there exists male dominance within these social groups. Often the strongest and most aggressive males will become the alphas of the group. This can be thought of like leaders of the group. This social hierarchy is well explained in a study done in 2018 by Jane Goodall institute. But in these groups of chimpanzees, females also have leading roles as alpha female groups. Although it is not probable that an alpha female will outrank an alpha male.

It was found that chimpanzees split activity budget into four main categories. The search for food, socialising, moving and resting. It was found that in the wild they spent 50% of their time in search of food. The rest of the time was then spent equally socialising, moving and resting.

Studies which were done all over the African continent showed the same trend for all chimpanzee subspecies. The social groups will break up into smaller groups called parties which mostly consist of males. They will control a certain area, this could lead to inter species fights and killings. This was found to be one of the leading causes of death of chimpanzees in the Gombe stream research center.

== Ecology ==
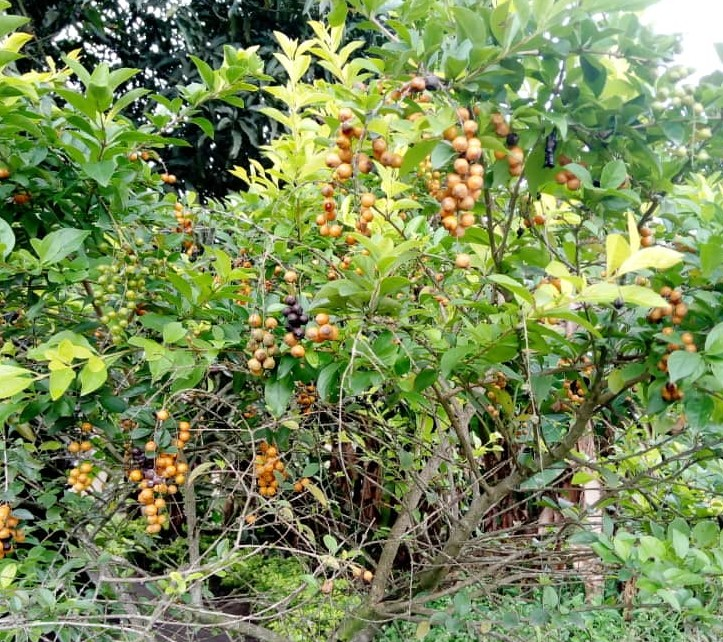
Fruits found in rainforest

Central chimpanzees have a key role in the ecology and environmental role. In the forest central chimpanzees are seed dispersers. As since the majority of their diet consist of fruits, they are not able to digest the seeds, so when they defecate these seeds are dispersed on the forest floor. The central chimpanzees have been found to provide treatments to the seeds in the gut that aid the germination of seeds. These factors combined make them very effective seed dispersers and a circuital element to the ecological rainforest environment.

=== Diet ===
Central chimpanzees are opportunistic frugivores. Compared to western lowland gorillas and Bornean orangutans who are generalized folivores and frugivores, central chimpanzees are specialised frugivores. Central chimpanzees diet consists mainly of fruits in their diets. During months were the fruit availability is low, central chimpanzees are able to keep a high fruit intake. The central chimpanzees tend to stay in the vegetation to get their food source. In a study, it mentions that central chimpanzees and western lowland gorillas high fruit consumption overlap in many parts of Central Africa. But in most cases, central chimpanzees consumed more fruits in their diets (60%), where western lowland gorillas also consumed more leaves. This is due to their digestive specificities. So they do not seem to have a direct competition for food between central chimpanzees and western lowland gorillas. It was also seen that central chimpanzees in the Montane forest of Kahuzi swallowed two different types of leaves of Commelinaceae for medical purposes. This was seen in 2.1% of the fecal matter of the central chimpanzees. It was proposed that this was done to control intestinal parasites. They are known to be occasional predators, which is the red colobus monkey. Although this is a rare occurrence, this does occur in Central Africa. The population being in decline the occurrence of Central Africa is diminishing.

== Conservation ==
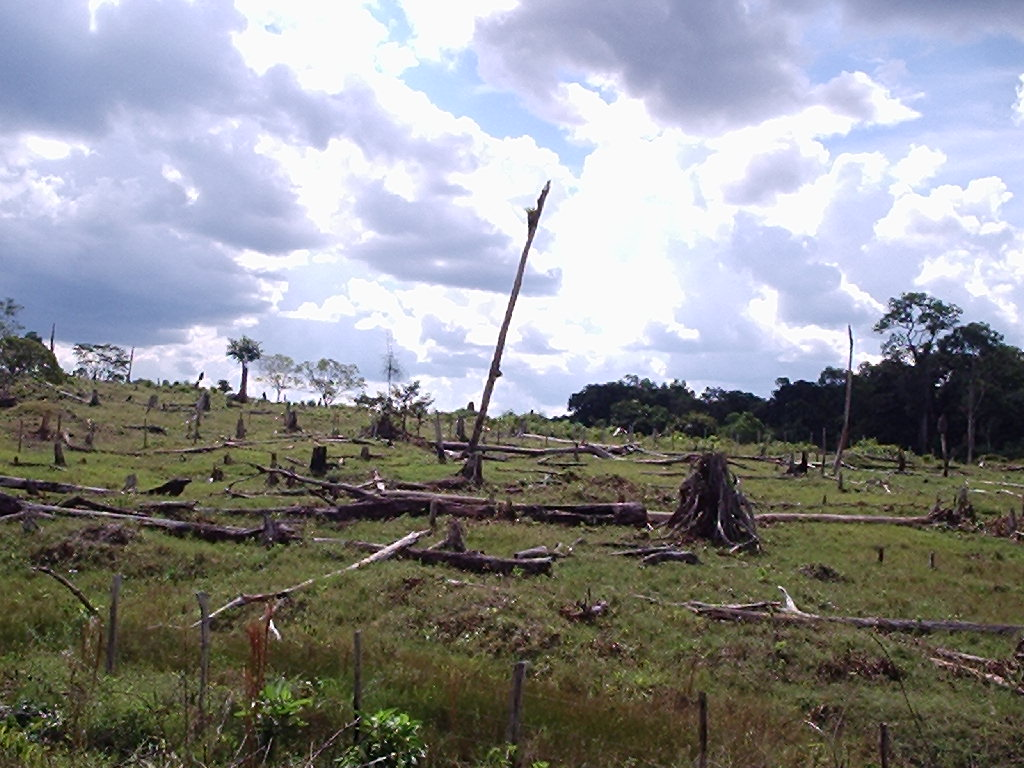
Image of deforestation in a rainforest

The 2007 International Union for Conservation of Nature (IUCN) Red List of Threatened Species classifies the central chimpanzee as endangered. In 1988, they were considered "vulnerable", but have been considered "endangered" since at least 1996. The World Wildlife Fund (WWF) estimates there are as many as 115,000 individuals alive, but that the number is more likely between 47,000 and 78,000 The central chimpanzee only has large, robust populations where large amounts of forest are left undisturbed; smaller, isolated populations also remain. According to the IUCN, decline in the central chimpanzee population is expected to continue for another 30 to 40 years.

Major threats to central chimpanzee populations include Ebola virus disease, poaching for bushmeat, and habitat destruction. The IUCN attributes this to increasing human presence (agriculture, de-forestation, development) and political instability.

Due to the close genetic relationship to gorillas, orangutans and humans, central chimpanzees are vulnerable to viruses that afflict humans, such as Ebola, the common cold, influenza, pneumonia, whooping cough, tuberculosis, measles, yellow fever, HIV and may contract other parasitological diseases such as schistosomiasis, filariasis, giardiasis, and salmonellosis.

== Disease ==
=== Spontaneous heart disease ===
One of the major causes of central chimpanzee deaths is caused by heart disease. This sudden cardiac death is caused by fatal arrhythmia. This is when the heart has an unorganised, erratic firing of the impulse which impact the ventricles. But in central chimpanzees, the post mortem analysis of this cause of death is complex to observe. The causes related to these spontaneous heart failures were observed in this study. They saw different reasons which lead to this disease; the most prevalent ones were renal failure and trauma.

=== Ebola virus ===
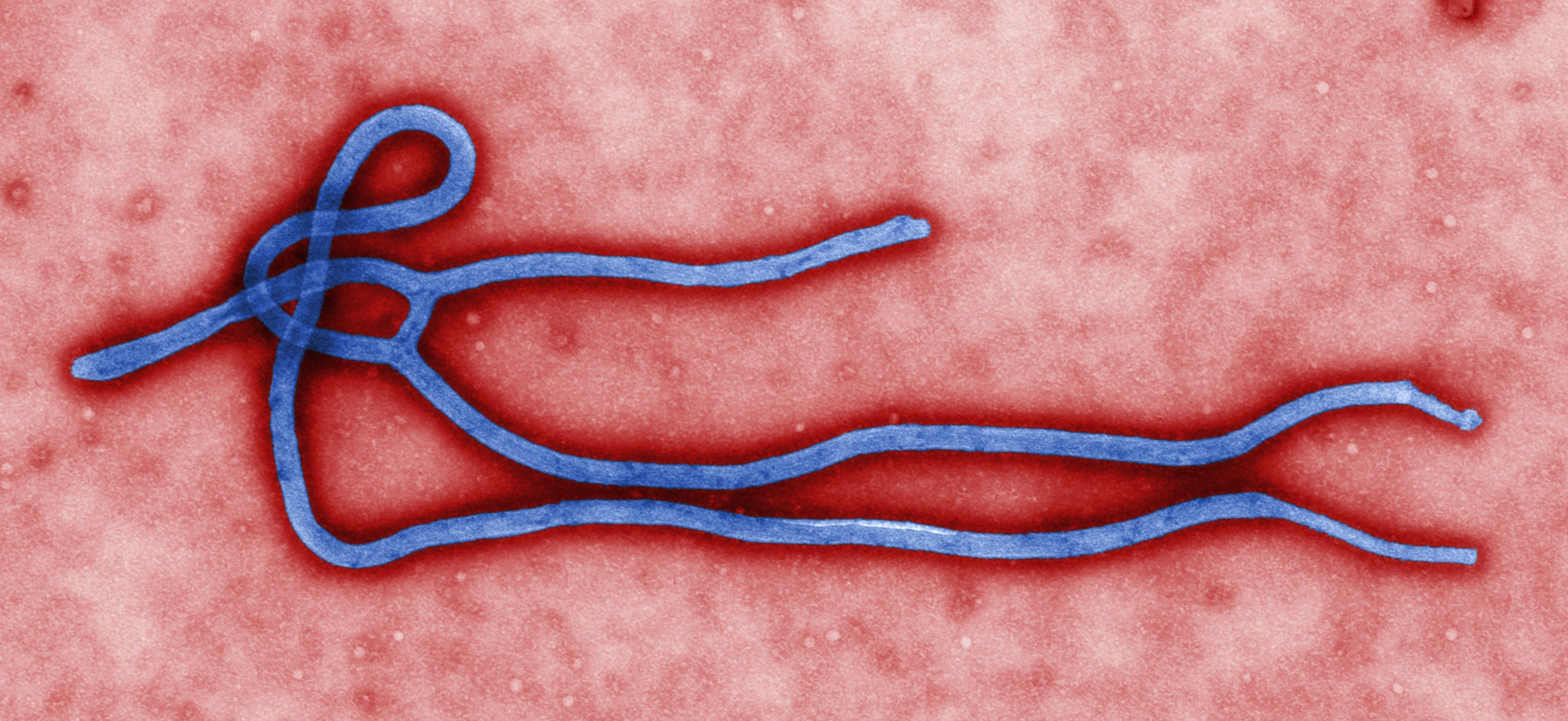
Picture showing the Ebola virus

Since the 1990s, there have been multiple outbreaks of Ebola in great apes especially central chimpanzees all over the African continent, this has had a great effect on the population numbers. It had strong impacts on the central chimpanzees and western lowland gorillas. This virus spread to central chimpanzees but spread to western chimpanzee species. Ebola also spread to western lowland gorillas and even to humans. In 1994, an outbreak of Ebola was recorded in Nature. During the time of a couple weeks, 25% of the central chimpanzee population disappeared in this rainforest, this amounted to 43 wild central chimpanzees that died. They were found in the Tai National Park.

The spread of Ebola is commonly inter species especially between western lowland gorillas and central chimpanzees. Since the 1990s, it is estimated that about one third of the population of western lowland gorillas and central chimpanzees have died.

In another study done about the 1996 outbreak that happened in North Eastern Gabon, showed that the population of central chimpanzees had a high risk of death if exposed to this virus. Out of the 37 central chimpanzees that were contaminated, 27 were found dead. This threat from Ebola pandemics combined with conservation and habitat destruction pose a large issue to the central chimpanzee population.

In 2004, an outbreak of Ebola of appeared in Central Africa. It had an enormous impact on the western lowland gorilla and therefore also had an impact on the central chimpanzee population. A study showed that the western lowland gorilla population in the area went from 380 individuals to 40. It is also noted in the study that the Ebola outbreak has caused a large decrease of the central chimpanzee population as well. This virus has drastic impact on the population of central chimpanzees.

==== Vaccine ====
In 2011, an experiment began in order to try to vaccinate the central chimpanzees with a vaccine developed for humans to reduce the spread of Ebola within the population. This experiment was performed on six central chimpanzees. Through this experiment, the central chimpanzees developed an immune response that was thought to have developed antibodies. This study was not conclusive. In 2015, the central chimpanzees were place on the endangered list so further experiments had to halted.

=== HIV ===
Two types of human immunodeficiency virus (HIV) infect humans: HIV-1 and HIV-2. HIV-1 is the more virulent and easily transmitted, and is the source of the majority of HIV infections throughout the world; HIV-2 is largely confined to West Africa. Both types originated in West and Central Africa. HIV-1 has evolved from a simian immunodeficiency virus (SIVcpz) found in the central chimpanzee. Kinshasa, in the Democratic Republic of the Congo, has the greatest genetic diversity of HIV-1 so far discovered, suggesting that the virus has been there longer than anywhere else. HIV-2 crossed species from a different strain of SIV, found in the sooty mangabey, monkeys in Guinea-Bissau.
