= Ai (chimpanzee) =

Chimpanzee subject (died 2026)

Ai アイ
- Species: Chimpanzee
- Born: c. 1976; Guinean forests of West Africa
- Died: January 9, 2026 (aged 49)
- Offspring: Ayumu

Ai (Japanese: アイ; c. 1976 – January 9, 2026) was a female western chimpanzee (Pan troglodytes verus), who lived at the Primate Research Institute of Kyoto University (acronym KUPRI). She was the first subject of the Ai project, a research program started in 1978 by Kiyoko Murofushi and Tetsuro Matsuzawa aimed at understanding chimpanzee cognition through computer interface experiments.

== Biography ==
Ai was born around 1976 in the Guinean forests of West Africa. Born wild, Ai was soon taken into captivity and sold to KUPRI in 1977 by an animal trader (this type of sale became illegal in 1980 with Japan's ratification of CITES). She was the first subject of KUPRI's chimpanzee project, which was intended to become Japan's first ape-language study in the vein of earlier ape-language studies. Ai was joined at KUPRI the following year by two more chimpanzees, Akira and Mari. In 2000, Ai gave birth to a son, Ayumu.

Ai died from multiple organ failure on January 9, 2026, at the age of 49.

== Ai Project ==
Matsuzawa has written that the difference between the Ai Project and earlier ape-language studies is that he was less interested in seeing if Ai and the other chimpanzees were capable of learning some degree of human language than trying to understand how chimpanzees perceive their surroundings. To study this, the research team created a customized keyboard for Ai and the other chimpanzees at KUPRI to interact with a computer. The computer was used to standardize the studies and reduce variation that might be introduced by human researchers. Researchers have studied Ai's memory, number-learning, and perception of color. Matsuzawa wrote that Ai was "the first chimpanzee who learned to use Arabic numerals to represent numbers," and her ordering of different shades and hues of Munsell color chips was similar to human orderings.

== Group and living quarters ==
In 2000, not long after the birth of three chimpanzees, Ai's group numbered 15; in 2010, there were 14 members. This is similar to the size of some small chimpanzee groups in the wild, where in some places with stable food supplies group size hovers at around 20 chimpanzees. Matsuzawa has attempted to blend elements of laboratory and field research, and KUPRI has an outdoor complex for the chimpanzees called the Ape Research Annex, built in 1995, with an 8-meter tall tower, a river, and trees.

After Ai gave birth to her son, Ayumu, in 2000, they were placed in a "twin booth" where Ayumu could live with Ai in one booth but also be exposed to the researcher in the other booth every day, making the researcher an integral part of Ayumu's life and studying him in front of Ai, with her implicit approval. Matsuzawa wrote that:

Two almost identical booths are placed side by side. There is a door between the two booths that can alternately be opened to connect the two areas, closed to separate the two individuals, or positioned half-open to allow the young chimpanzee to crawl from one area to the other while preventing the mother chimpanzee from entering the neighboring booth.

This method allowed the research team to consistently track Ayumu's development without interfering excessively with the mother-offspring relationship.

== Art ==
Ai loved to paint and draw –– she started drawing at a young age –– and was often brought art materials for free-drawing or painting. She created art as an end in itself, without a food reward. In 2013 she made a painting that was given to the president of Kyoto University; later, in honor of the 40th anniversary of her arrival at KUPRI, this painting was made into a silk scarf and given as a gift to Jane Goodall.

== See also ==
- Ayumu (chimpanzee)
- Great ape language
- List of individual apes
- Primate Research Institute
