= Primate Research Institute =

Research institute in Inuyama, Japan

Coordinates: 35°23′5″N 136°57′25″E

The Primate Research Institute, Kyoto University (Japanese: 京都大学霊長類研究所, Hepburn: Kyōto Daigaku Reichōrui Kenkyūjyo) is a Japanese research center for the study of primates. It was founded in 1967 by primatologists Kinji Imanishi and Junichiro Itani. The institute works toward understanding the biological, behavioral, and socioecological aspects of primates, and the origin and evolution of humans. The institute is located in the city of Inuyama, Aichi Prefecture, which is about 150 km east of the main campus of Kyoto University. Through the Division of Biological Sciences of the Graduate School of Science of Kyoto University, the institute offers graduate programs leading to the Master of Science and Doctorate of Science degrees in the field of primatological science. Since 2013, the director of the institute is botanist Hirohisa Hirai (following Tetsuro Matsuzawa's tenure from 2006 to 2012).

== Facilities ==
The institute has a 5-story main building housing the administration office, the library, and the research departments; a 3-story building for the Center for Human Evolution Modeling Research, which has been established on April 1, 1999; a 5-story Ape Research Annex; and a guest house providing accommodations for about 30 visiting scientists. The Field Research Center has its headquarters at Inuyama; one field laboratory is at Koshima, Miyazaki Prefecture, and four other research stations in different regions.

Being a national research center, the institute has a special program, the Cooperative Research Program, for visiting scientists to carry out research on monkeys and apes. Each year about 170 scientists from outside the institute benefit from this program.

The institute has published the Annual Reports of the Primate Research Institute, Kyoto University, in Japanese since 1971.

== History ==
The Primate Research Institute, Kyoto University was founded on June 1, 1967. After World War II, two different research groups made a joint effort to expand the study of primatology in Japan by establishing a national research center. One group, from Kyoto University, was represented by Kinji Imanishi (1902–1992) who initiated the field study of nonhuman primates in their natural habitats. The second group was from Tokyo University, represented by Toshihiko Tokizane (1909–1973), a pioneer of brain science who initiated the experimental study of non-human primates in Japan. The two research groups differed in many respects, but collaborated with each other to institutionalize the study of non-human primates.

In 1956, Meitetsu rail-road company and other companies in the Chūbu area built the Japan Monkey Center (JMC) as a tourist attraction. Inuyama was chosen as the location for JMC since the city was already famous for its ancient castle. The JMC was created as a private foundation under the control of the Ministry of Education, Science, and Culture. Imanishi and his students, who promoted the creation of the JMC, also developed an on-site research center. In 1964, Shin'ichiro Tomonaga, the second Japanese Nobel Prize winner, played an important role in expanding primate research beyond the JMC center. As president of the Science Council of Japan, he sent a letter to Prime Minister Hayato Ikeda recommending the establishment of a national institute for primate studies. In the letter he outlined the departments and sections it would ideally contain. Three years later, in 1967, the Primate Research Institute was founded as part of Kyoto University. Rather than build PRI on the Kyoto University campus, the decision was made to build it in Inuyama, close to the existing JMC.

In 2020 the university announced that the institute had misappropriated funds during Matsuzawa's term.

== Departments ==
- Department of Evolution and Phylogeny
- Department of Ecology and Social Behavior
- Department of Behavioral and Brain Sciences
- Department of Cellular and Molecular Biology

== See also ==
- Primatology
- Kyoto University
- Ai (Chimpanzee)
- Ayumu (chimpanzee)
