= Ayumu (chimpanzee) =

Chimpanzee research subject (born 2000)

- Species: chimpanzee
- Sex: male
- Born: April 24, 2000 (age 26)
- Parent: Ai (chimpanzee)

Ayumu (born 24 April 2000) is a chimpanzee currently living at the Primate Research Institute of Kyoto University. He is the son of chimpanzee Ai and has been a participant since infancy in the Ai Project, an ongoing research effort aimed at understanding chimpanzee cognition. As part of the Ai Project, Ayumu participated in a series of short-term memory tasks, such as remembering the sequential order of numbers displayed on a touch-sensitive computer screen. His performance in the tasks was superior to that of comparably trained university students, leading to a possible conclusion that young chimpanzees have better working memory than adult humans. This conclusion has been disputed by other researchers, who claim that Ayumu had significant practice in this task before the final test, whereas the human participants did not.

== See also ==
- List of individual apes
