= Moja (chimpanzee) =

Chimpanzee known for to paint figurative works

- Other name: Swahili: "one"
- Species: Chimpanzee
- Sex: Female
- Born: November 18, 1972; Laboratory for Experimental Medicine and Surgery in Primates (LEMSIP)
- Died: June 6, 2002 (Aged 29)
- Known for: the first ape to paint figurative works

Moja (Swahili: "one"; November 18, 1972 - June 6, 2002) was a chimpanzee at the Chimpanzee and Human Communication Institute. She was born at the Laboratory for Experimental Medicine and Surgery in Primates (LEMSIP). In infanthood, Moja was used in a science experiment by Allen and Beatrix Gardner, who raised her like a human child immersed in an environment of American Sign Language. She was later taken in by Roger and Deborah Fouts, who brought Moja and other chimps involved in the sign language experiments — Washoe and her son Loulis, Dar, and Tatu — to Central Washington University.

While engaging in play activities, she was observed changing her appearance in the presence of a mirror using clothing, masks and make-up. She was also observed to place sunglasses upon her head, look into a mirror and make the sign-language sign for "glasses" on one occasion, also using the mirror for the application of lip-gloss and a crayon for the same purpose.

Moja is known as "the first ape to paint figurative works." For example, she drew a circle, colored it orange, and signed cherry.

She had a fear of metal ice cube tray dividers, which her fellow chimp Tatu would taunt her with.

== Death ==
Moja died on June 6, 2002 at CHCI of a severe hernia at the age of 29.

== See also ==
- Great ape language
- List of individual apes
