= Comparative psychology =

Study of non-human animal behavior and mental processes

Comparative psychology is the scientific study of the behavior and mental processes of non-human animals, especially as these relate to the phylogenetic history, adaptive significance, and development of behavior. The phrase comparative psychology may be employed in either a narrow or a broad meaning. In its narrow meaning, it refers to the study of the similarities and differences in the psychology and behavior of different species. In a broader meaning, comparative psychology includes comparisons between different biological and socio-cultural groups, such as species, sexes, developmental stages, ages, and ethnicities. Research in this area addresses many different issues, uses many different methods and explores the behavior of many different species, from insects to primates.

Comparative psychology is sometimes assumed to emphasize cross-species comparisons, including those between humans and animals. However, some researchers feel that direct comparisons should not be the sole focus of comparative psychology and that intense focus on a single organism to understand its behavior is just as desirable, if not more so. Donald Dewsbury reviewed the works of several psychologists and their definitions and concluded that the object of comparative psychology is to establish principles of generality focusing on both proximate and ultimate causation.

Using a comparative approach to behavior allows one to evaluate the target behavior from four different, complementary perspectives developed by Niko Tinbergen. First, one may ask how pervasive the behavior is across species (i.e., how common is the behavior between animal species?). Second, one may ask how the behavior contributes to the lifetime reproductive success of the individuals demonstrating the behavior (i.e. does the behavior result in animals producing more offspring than animals not displaying the behavior)? Theories addressing the ultimate causes of behavior are based on the answers to these two questions.

Third, what mechanisms are involved in the behavior (i.e. what physiological, behavioral, and environmental components are necessary and sufficient for the generation of the behavior)? Fourth, a researcher may ask about the development of the behavior within an individual (i.e. what maturational, learning, and social experiences must an individual undergo in order to demonstrate a behavior?) Theories addressing the proximate causes of behavior are based on answers to these two questions. For more details see Tinbergen's four questions.

== History ==
The 9th-century scholar al-Jahiz wrote works on the social organization and communication methods of animals like ants. The 11th-century Arabic writer Ibn al-Haytham (Alhazen) wrote the Treatise on the Influence of Melodies on the Souls of Animals, an early treatise dealing with the effects of music on animals. In the treatise, he demonstrates how a camel's pace could be hastened or slowed with the use of music, and shows other examples of how music can affect animal behavior, experimenting with horses, birds and reptiles. Through to the 19th century, a majority of scholars in the Western world continued to believe that music was a distinctly human phenomenon, but experiments since then have vindicated Ibn al-Haytham's view that music does indeed have an effect on animals.

Charles Darwin was central to the development of comparative psychology; it is thought that psychology should be spoken of in terms of "pre-" and "post-Darwin" because his contributions were so influential. Darwin's theory led to several hypotheses, one being that the factors that set humans apart, such as higher mental, moral, and spiritual faculties, could be accounted for by evolutionary principles. In response to the vehement opposition to Darwinism, the "anecdotal movement" led by George Romanes set out to demonstrate that animals possessed a "rudimentary human mind". Romanes is most famous for two major flaws in his work: his focus on anecdotal observations and his entrenched anthropomorphism.

In 1843, Lewis H. Morgan published "Mind or Instinct: An Inquiry Concerning the Manifestation of Mind by the Lower Orders of Animals" in The Knickerbocker, arguing that animal behaviour demonstrated faculties such as memory, foresight, and reasoning, while criticising "instinct" as an inadequate explanation. He returned to the subject in 1857 with an unpublished paper, "Animal Psychology", presented to the Pundit Club in Rochester, New York. This paper attributed animal behaviour to perception, memory, reflection, volition, and reason, and suggested continuity between human and nonhuman mental faculties. Although little known at the time, the essay has been identified as an early critique of instinct in American comparative psychology.

Near the end of the 19th century, several other scientists produced highly influential work. Douglas Alexander Spalding, called the "first experimental biologist," worked mostly with birds to study instinct, imprinting, and visual and auditory development. Jacques Loeb emphasized the importance of objectively studying behavior. Sir John Lubbock is credited with first using mazes and puzzle devices to study learning and Conwy Lloyd Morgan is thought to be "the first ethologist in the sense in which we presently use the word".

Although the field initially attempted to include a variety of species, by the early 1950s it focused primarily on white lab rats and pigeons, and the topic of study was restricted to learning, usually in mazes. This stunted state of affairs was pointed out by Frank Beach in 1950, and although it was generally agreed with him, no real change took place. He repeated these charges a decade later, again with no results.

Meanwhile, in Europe, the field of ethology was making strides in studying a multitude of animal species and a plethora of behaviors. There was friction between the two disciplines where there should have been cooperation, but comparative psychologists refused, for the most part, to broaden their horizons. This state of affairs ended with the triumph of ethology over comparative psychology, culminating in the Nobel Prize being awarded to ethologists, along with a flood of informative books and television programs on ethological studies that were widely seen and read in the United States. At present, comparative psychology in the United States is moribund.

Throughout the long history of comparative psychology, repeated attempts have been made to enforce a more disciplined approach, in which similar studies are carried out on animals of different species, and the results interpreted in terms of their different phylogenetic or ecological backgrounds. Behavioral ecology in the 1970s gave a more solid base of knowledge against which a true comparative psychology could develop. However, the broader use of the term "comparative psychology" is enshrined in the names of learned societies and academic journals, not to mention in the minds of psychologists of other specialisms, so the label of the field is not likely to disappear completely.

A persistent question which comparative psychologists have endeavored to study is the relative intelligence of different species of animal. Indeed, some early efforts at a genuinely comparative psychology involved evaluating how well animals of different species could learn various tasks. However, these attempts floundered. In retrospect it can be seen that they were not sufficiently sophisticated, either in their analysis of the demands of different tasks, or in their choice of species to compare.

However, the definition of "intelligence" in comparative psychology is deeply affected by anthropomorphism; experiments focused on simple tasks, complex problems, reversal learning, learning sets, and delayed alternation were plagued with practical and theoretical problems. In the literature, "intelligence" is generally defined as whatever is closest to human performance, and neglects behaviors that humans are usually incapable of (e.g. echolocation). Specifically, comparative researchers encounter problems associated with individual differences, differences in motivation, differences in reinforcement, differences in sensory function, differences in motor capacities, and species-typical preparedness (i.e. some species have evolved to acquire some behaviors quicker than other behaviors).

== Species studied ==
A wide variety of species have been studied by comparative psychologists. However, a small number have dominated the scene. Ivan Pavlov's early work used dogs; although they have been the subject of occasional studies, since then they have not figured prominently. Increasing interest in the study of abnormal animal behavior has led to a return to the study of most kinds of domestic animals. Thorndike began his studies with cats, but American comparative psychologists quickly shifted to the more economical rat, which remained the almost invariable subject for the first half of the 20th century and continues to be used.

Skinner introduced the use of pigeons, and they continue to be important in some fields. There has always been interest in studying various species of primate; important contributions to social and developmental psychology were made by Harry F. Harlow's studies of maternal deprivation in rhesus monkeys. Cross-fostering studies have shown similarities between human infants and infant chimpanzees. Kellogg and Kellogg (1933) aimed to look at heredity and environmental effects of young primates. They found that a cross-fostered chimpanzee named Gua was better at recognizing human smells and clothing and that the Kelloggs' infant (Donald) recognised humans better by their faces. The study ended nine months after it had begun, after the infant began to imitate the noises of Gua.

Nonhuman primates have also been used to show the development of language in comparison with human development. For example, Gardner (1967) successfully taught the female chimpanzee Washoe 350 words in American Sign Language. Washoe subsequently passed on some of this teaching to her adopted offspring, Loulis. A criticism of Washoe's acquisition of sign language focused on the extent to which she actually understood what she was signing. Her signs may have just been based on an association to get a reward, such as food or a toy. Other studies concluded that apes do not understand linguistic input, but may form an intended meaning of what is being communicated. All great apes have been reported to have the capacity of allospecific symbolic production.

Interest in primate studies has increased with the rise in studies of animal cognition. Other animals thought to be intelligent have also been increasingly studied. Examples include various species of corvid, parrots—especially the grey parrot—and dolphins. Alex (Avian Learning Experiment) is a well-known case study (1976–2007) which was developed by Pepperberg, who found that the African gray parrot Alex did not only mimic vocalisations but understood the concepts of same and different between objects. The study of non-human mammals has also included the study of dogs. Due to their domestic nature and personalities, dogs have lived closely with humans, and parallels in communication and cognitive behaviours have therefore been recognised and further researched. Joly-Mascheroni and colleagues (2008) demonstrated that dogs may be able to catch human yawns and suggested a level of empathy in dogs, a point that is strongly debated. Pilley and Reid found that a Border Collie named Chaser was able to successfully identify and retrieve 1022 distinct objects/toys.

== Animal cognition ==
Researchers who study animal cognition are interested in understanding the mental processes that control complex behavior, and much of their work parallels that of cognitive psychologists working with humans. For example, there is extensive research with animals on attention, categorization, concept formation, memory, spatial cognition, and time estimation. Much research in these and other areas is related directly or indirectly to behaviors important to survival in natural settings, such as navigation, tool use, and numerical competence. Thus, comparative psychology and animal cognition are heavily overlapping research categories.

== Disorders of animal behavior ==
Veterinary surgeons recognize that the psychological state of a captive or domesticated animal must be taken into account if its behavior and health are to be understood and optimized.

Common causes of disordered behavior in captive or pet animals are lack of stimulation, inappropriate stimulation, or overstimulation. These conditions can lead to disorders, unpredictable and unwanted behavior, and sometimes even physical symptoms and diseases. For example, rats who are exposed to loud music for a long period will ultimately develop unwanted behaviors that have been compared with human psychosis, like biting their owners.

The way dogs behave when understimulated is widely believed to depend on the breed as well as on the individual animal's character. For example, huskies have been known to ruin gardens and houses if they are not allowed enough activity. Dogs are also prone to psychological damage if they are subjected to violence. If they are treated very badly, they may become dangerous.

The systematic study of disordered animal behavior draws on research in comparative psychology, including the early work on conditioning and instrumental learning, but also on ethological studies of natural behavior. However, at least in the case of familiar domestic animals, it also draws on the accumulated experience of those who have worked closely with the animals.

== Human–animal relationships ==
The relationship between humans and animals has long been of interest to anthropologists as one pathway to an understanding of the evolution of human behavior. Similarities between the behavior of humans and animals have sometimes been used in an attempt to understand the evolutionary significance of particular behaviors. Differences in the treatment of animals have been said to reflect a society's understanding of human nature and the place of humans and animals in the scheme of things. Domestication has been of particular interest. For example, it has been argued that, as animals became domesticated, humans treated them as property and began to see them as inferior or fundamentally different from humans.

Ingold remarks that in all societies children have to learn to differentiate and separate themselves from others. In this process, strangers may be seen as "not people", and like animals. Ingold quoted Sigmund Freud: "Children show no trace of arrogance which urges adult civilized men to draw a hard-and-fast line between their own nature and that of all other animals. Children have no scruples over allowing animals to rank as their full equals." With maturity however, humans find it hard to accept that they themselves are animals, so they categorize, separating humans from animals, and animals into wild animals and tame animals, and tame animals into house pets and livestock. Such divisions can be seen as similar to categories of humans: who is part of a human community and someone who is not—that is, the outsider.

The New York Times ran an article that showed the psychological benefits of animals, more specifically of children with their pets. It has been proven that having a pet does in fact improve kids' social skills. In the article, Dr. Sue Doescher, a psychologist involved in the study, stated, "It made the children more cooperative and sharing." It was also shown that these kids were more confident in themselves and able to be more empathic with other children.

Furthermore, in an edition of Social Science and Medicine it was stated, "A random survey of 339 residents from Perth, Western Australia were selected from three suburbs and interviewed by telephone. Pet ownership was found to be positively associated with some forms of social contact and interaction, and with perceptions of neighborhood friendliness. After adjustment for demographic variables, pet owners scored higher on social capital and civic engagement scales." Results like these let us know that owning a pet provides opportunities for neighborly interaction, among many other chances for socialization among people.

== Topics of study ==
- Individual behavior
  - General descriptions
  - Orientation (interaction with environment)
  - Locomotion
  - Ingestive behavior
  - Hoarding
  - Nest building
  - Exploration
  - Play
  - Tonic immobility (playing dead)
  - Other miscellaneous behaviors (personal grooming, hibernation, etc.)
- Reproductive behavior
  - General descriptions
  - Developmental psychology
  - Control (nervous system and endocrine system)
  - Imprinting
  - Evolution of sexual characteristics/behaviors
- Social behavior
  - Imitation
  - Behavior genetics
  - Instincts
  - Sensory-perceptual processes
  - Neural and endocrine correlates of behavior
  - Motivation
  - Evolution
  - Learning
  - Qualitative and functional comparisons
  - Consciousness and mind

== Notable comparative psychologists ==
Noted comparative psychologists, in this broad sense, include:

- Aristotle
- Frank Beach
- F.J.J. Buytendijk
- Charles Darwin
- James Mark Baldwin
- Allen and Beatrix Gardner
- Harry F. Harlow
- Donald Hebb
- Richard Herrnstein
- L.T. Hobhouse
- Clark L. Hull
- Linus Kline
- Wolfgang Köhler
- Konrad Lorenz
- Emil Wolfgang Menzel Jr.
- Neal E. Miller
- C. Lloyd Morgan
- O. Hobart Mowrer
- Robert Lockhard
- Ivan Pavlov
- Irene Pepperberg
- George Romanes
- Thorleif Schjelderup-Ebbe
- Sara Shettleworth
- B.F. Skinner
- Willard Small
- Edward C. Tolman
- Edward L. Thorndike
- Jakob von Uexküll
- Margaret Floy Washburn
- John B. Watson
- Wilhelm Wundt

Many of these were active in fields other than animal psychology; this is characteristic of comparative psychologists.

== Related fields ==
Fields of psychology and other disciplines that draw upon, or overlap with, comparative psychology include:

- Animal cognition
- Behavioral ecology
- Biosemiotics
- Comparative neuropsychology
- Ethology
- Evolutionary neuroscience
- Experimental analysis of behavior
- Neuroethology
- Operant conditioning
- Physiological psychology
- Psychopharmacology
- Trans-species psychology
- Zoosemiotics
