= Great ape language =

Efforts to teach other apes human communication

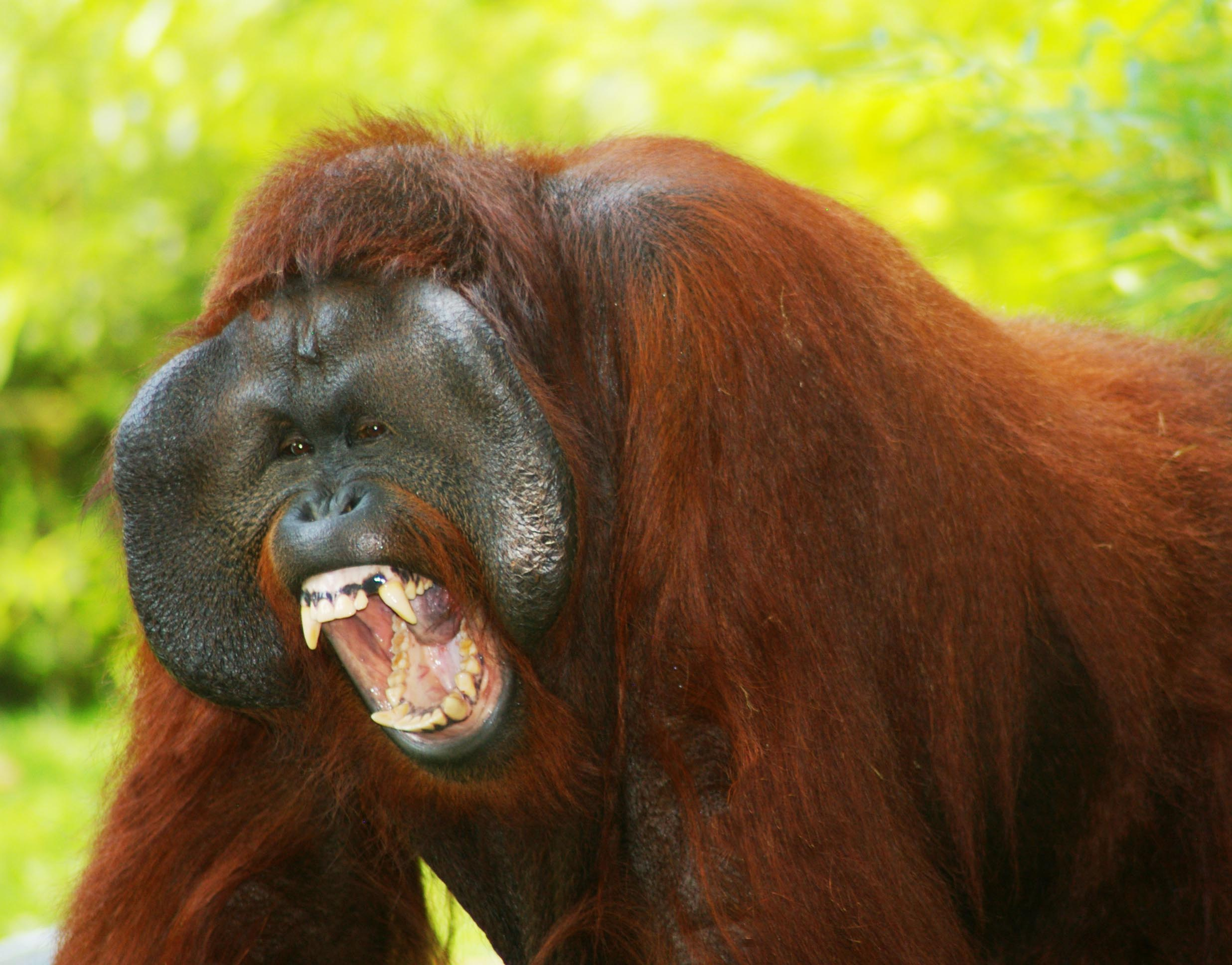
Facial expressions can be used to convey a message.

Great ape language research historically involved attempts to teach chimpanzees, gorillas, and orangutans to communicate using imitative human speech, sign language, physical tokens and computerized lexigrams. These studies were controversial, with debate focused on the definition of language, the welfare of test subjects, and the anthropocentric nature of this line of inquiry.

The consensus among linguists remains that human language is unique.

Contemporary research has steered away from attempting to teach apes human language and focuses instead on observing apes' intraspecies communication in zoos and natural habitats. This includes gestures, facial expressions, and vocalizations.

== 1890s: Richard L. Garner ==
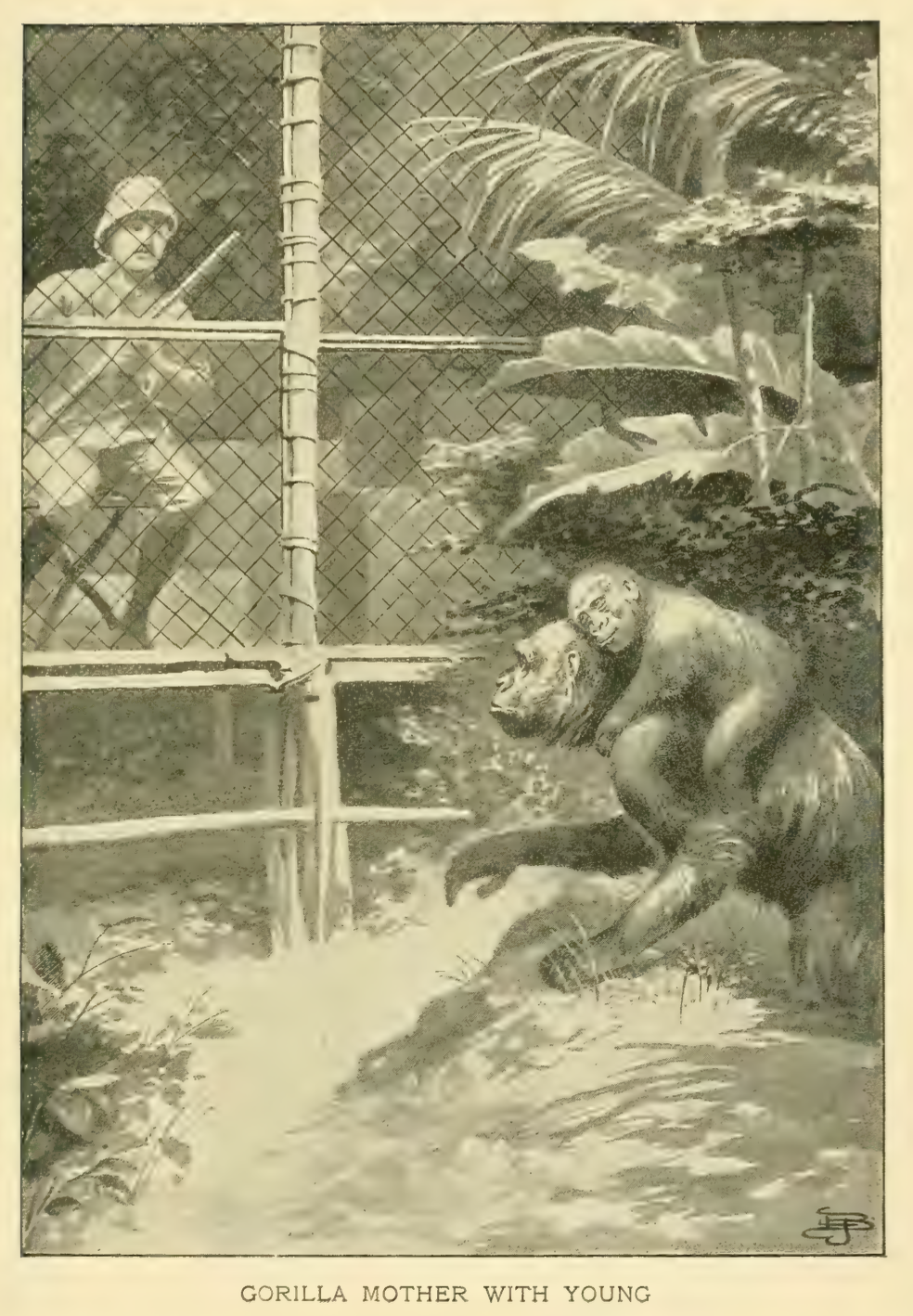
Richard L. Garner lived in a cage to study gorillas in the field. Illustration from Apes and Monkeys: Their Life and Language (1900)

Richard Lynch Garner was the first researcher to explore in depth the communication skills of nonhuman primates. He began in 1884 studying monkeys in American zoos and later travelled to Africa to study gorillas and chimpanzees. He wrote frequently for popular journals and newspapers and ultimately had three books published on the subject, The Speech of Monkeys (1892), Gorillas & Chimpanzees (1896), and Apes and Monkeys: Their Life and Language (1900).

Garner argued that nonhuman primates have their own forms of speech. He claimed to be able to talk to the animals and act as their interpreter. His methods and conclusions were not scientific by any modern definition, but his work was nonetheless significant. For one thing, Garner studied the animals' intraspecies vocalizations, in some cases in their natural habitats. He went to great length to do so, even living inside of a cage himself to observe gorillas in Africa. This was in contrast to later language studies, which separated apes from their conspecifics (peers) and placed them in alien – human – habitats. Second, Garner pioneered the use of recording primate vocalizations and playing them back later for experimental purposes.

== 1930s: Cross-fostering and efforts to teach speaking ==
The next line of research came out of cross-fostering studies, where chimpanzees were raised in human homes as children. Primatologist Robert Yerkes launched one such project. He recruited Luella and Winthrop Niles Kellogg, scientists at Indiana University, to raise a chimp named Gua alongside their human child, Donald. In The Ape and the Child, the Kelloggs wrote that "it was very clear during the first few months that the ape was considerably superior to the child in responding to human words. She began to react distinctively to separate vocal stimuli within a few weeks after she had entered the human environment."

The Kelloggs noted that Gua made several distinct vocalizations to communicate different needs, and, accordingly, tried to teach her to speak English words. The Kelloggs were building on Yerkes' assertion:

It seemingly is well established that the motor mechanism of voice in this ape is adequate not only to the production of a considerable variety of sounds, but also to definite articulations similar to those of man.

But Gua did not communicate using human words. Instead of the chimp copying the humans, the Kelloggs' son Donald started copying the chimp, adopting Gua's vocalizations. Donald would use food grunts, for example, when hungry. Shortly after the Kelloggs made this observation, the experiment was discontinued. (Yerkes disapproved of Winthrop's book about the Gua experiment and had records of the project stricken from his Orange Park hub.)

After the Kellogg study, there were four similar research projects into cross-fostering. The most notable of these was conducted by Keith and Catherine Hayes with their chimpanzee Viki. Viki would lead people to places she wanted to go as well as move the hands of people onto objects she wanted them to manipulate. She would rarely point to objects that she wanted; instead she would make gestures. For example, when she wanted to help with ironing, she would move her hand back and forth above the ironing board. This experiment with Viki would inspire other researchers to conduct similar experiments. But when it came to teaching Viki to speak, the Hayes' efforts were only marginally more effective than others who tried to teach chimps to talk. After nearly seven years of intensive exposure to English, Viki spoke only four words, mama, papa, cup, and up.

== 1960s–1980s: Sign language ==
=== Washoe and the Gardners ===
In 1966, the husband-and-wife research team of Beatrix T. Gardner and Robert Allen Gardner initiated a new generation of language research. After the failed efforts of teaching apes to speak, the Gardners wondered whether the issue was a motor deficiency rather than cognitive inability. The couple had been watching film of Viki, the chimp involved in the early speech study, and noticed that she was intelligible without sound; she was making gestures with her hands as she tried to pronounce words. The Gardners decided to test a chimpanzee's abilities with a gestural language, American Sign Language (ASL). They were not the first scientists to come up with this idea. Pepys advocated teaching sign language to chimps in the 17th century; de la Mettrie and Monboddo suggested the same in the 18th; and William Wundt in the early 20th century. But the Gardners were the first to conduct formal research into the matter.

The Gardners secured a 10-month-old chimpanzee they named Washoe in June 1966. Up to age 5, Washoe lived in a trailer in the backyard of the Gardner's home in Reno, Nevada. The Gardners hired graduate students to work with Washoe, most notably Roger Fouts, who later became Washoe's primary caregiver. No one around Washoe was allowed to speak; instead, they were instructed to use signs from American Sign Language (ASL) exclusively. Washoe's primary caregivers were not fluent in ASL. The Gardners employed native ASL speakers on subsequent chimp projects.

The Gardners tried to anticipate criticism of their work from the start. A word would not be counted as part of Washoe's vocabulary until she had used it appropriately and spontaneously at least once a day for 15 consecutive days. (Penny Patterson used this framework for her studies with gorilla Koko as well, at least initially.) It proved to be a difficult benchmark to meet, especially when it came to the vocabulary involving things not typically encountered daily (horse, pipe, hankie).

In addition, the Gardners set up a double-blind testing apparatus for Washoe and subsequent chimp language projects. The chimp was seated in front of a screen that was sheltered from human view. One person would flash random slides for the ape to see, another person (who could not see the slides) would record the ape's response, and a third person viewing from a one-way mirror in a separate room would independently record the chimp's response. Two persons were employed to separately interpret Washoe because of the inherent ambiguity of reading an ape's signs: chimp hands and body are different than humans', and the meaning of ASL signs is shaped by their position and movement in space regarding one's body. When the two interpretations were found to match each other as well as the picture that had been shown, the sign was accepted as correct. Anything else was recorded as an error. (In his book, Next of Kin, Roger Fouts wrote that he sometimes found the errors more illuminating than correct responses.)

The double-blind testing apparatus was set up to avoid unconscious bias, particularly a Clever Hans effect, in which humans unwittingly tip off their animal subjects through body language, facial expressions, or other means.

Tests showed Washoe reliably used 85 signs singly and in combination with other words by her third year with the Gardners. (The number of reliable signs rose to 132 later.) According to Eugene Linden, an independent journalist who focused on ape language research, she asked questions and used negatives ("no" in combination with another word).

When Washoe was five, the Gardners arranged to send her to the University of Oklahoma's Institute of Primate Studies in Norman, Oklahoma, with Roger Fouts and Deborah Fouts. The Gardners continued to conduct sign-language research on infant chimpanzees, using Moja, Pili, Tatu, and Dar in subsequent studies. With these later projects, the couple sought to improve on the methodology of Project Washoe by securing chimps immediately after birth, employing fluent ASL speakers, providing the chimps with chimp "siblings"; and iterating upon their language training techniques.

=== Washoe and Roger Fouts ===
The Gardners were scientists schooled in behaviorism. Roger Fouts came to the chimp language studies as an animal lover pursuing a career in child development. These differing backgrounds corresponded with differing approaches. The Gardners initially wanted Fouts and other grad students to strictly use methods of operant conditioning – rewards and punishment – to teach Washoe, but Fouts believed that teaching a language was not the same as teaching a lab rat tricks. He recalled:

According to behaviorism, the combination of a hungry chimp and ready-to-dispense food should be the perfect opportunity for reinforcement and learning. But the hungrier Washoe was, the quicker her signing deteriorated into pure repetition and finally outright begging.

Fouts believed that chimpanzees needed room to learn in manner similar to human children, on their own timeline. He considered direct instruction ineffective, as it was often met with resistance. The child, not the parent, drives the learning process, argued Fouts:

If you try to impose a rigid discipline while teaching a child or a chimp, you are working against the boundless curiosity and need for relaxed play that make learning possible.

Though the Gardners instituted Skinnerian protocols in Washoe's first year, they began to see advantages to Fouts' approach, acknowledging, "Young chimpanzees and young children have a limited tolerance for school." But the issue exposed a key tension behind Project Washoe and similar language research to follow. On one hand, researchers needed a strict, repetitive process with clinical double-blind testing for their work to be accepted as science. Without such rigor, the body of work became vulnerable to criticism. On the other hand, researchers need to recognize the apes' emotional needs or they faced a different suite of problems. The Gardners fit more comfortably in the first camp, focused on scientific rigor; Roger Fouts and his wife Deborah fit more in the latter, later becoming advocates for animal rights and welfare. But the tension proved unavoidable.

=== Nim Chimpsky ===
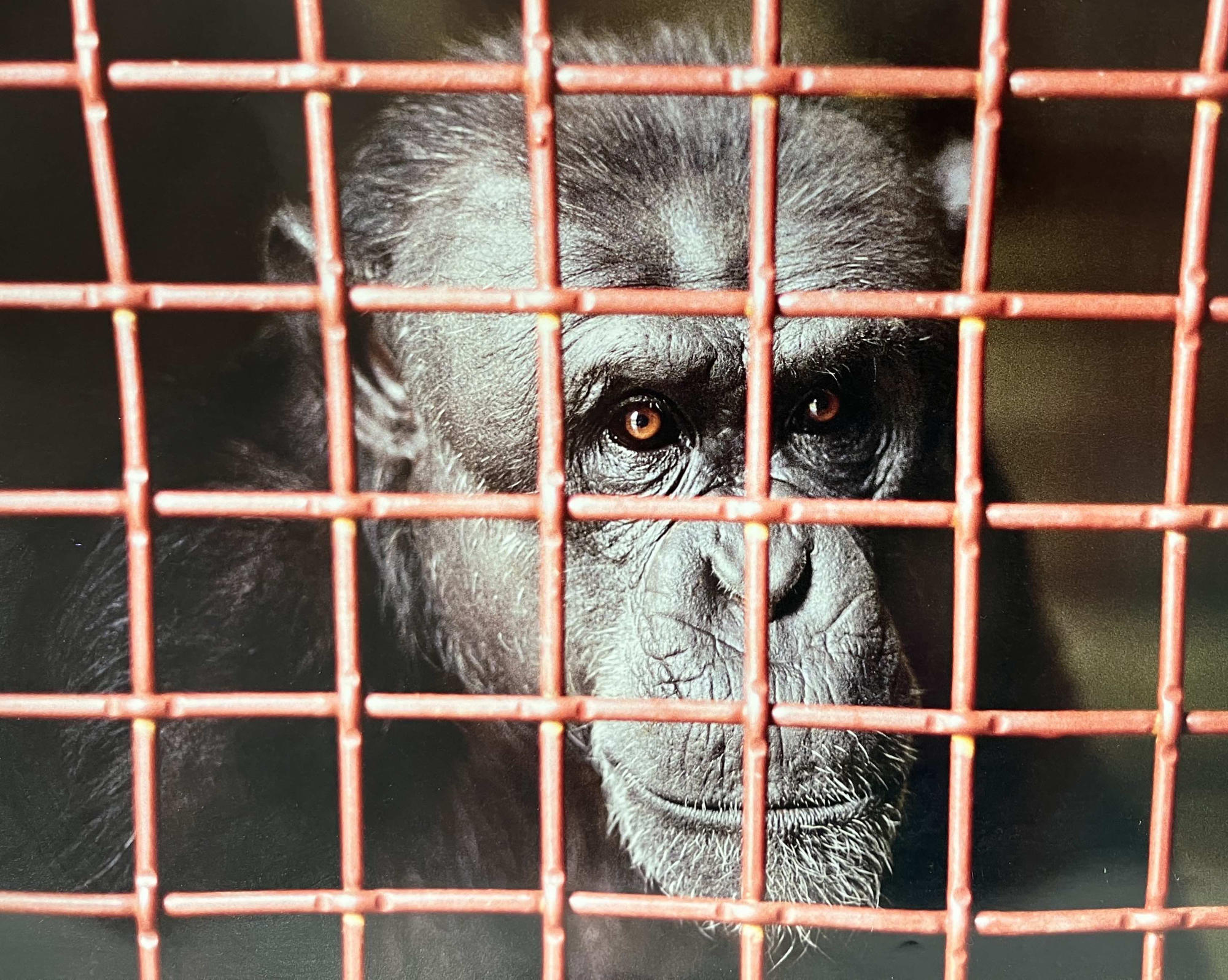
Nim Chimpsky in 1999

In 1973, Herbert S. Terrace of Columbia University set out to improve upon the Washoe research using a chimp he named Nim Chimpsky (a pun on linguist Noam Chomsky). Over the course of Project Nim, the infant chimp was shuttled between locations and a revolving group of roughly 60 caregivers, mostly students and volunteers, few of whom were proficient in sign language.

Before he was 1 year old, Nim began fighting for dominance by biting his caregivers. The project was initially intended to last roughly 10 years. But after four years of research, Nim had become too difficult to manage and was returned to the Institute for Primate Studies in Oklahoma.

Nim's chaotic upbringing, documented in Elizabeth Hess's biography Nim Chimpsky: The Chimp Who Would Be Human, negatively impacted not only his behavior but his performance on language-related tasks. Even Terrace acknowledged this problem, noting that Nim's "emotional turmoil" was a "major obstacle" in his progress.

After sending Nim back to Oklahoma, Terrace reviewed his data and concluded that Nim copied signs from his teachers to get a reward. Terrace argued that Nim did not initiate conversation or create sentences. Terrace said that he had not noticed this throughout the duration of the study but only upon reviewing video tape. Terrace ultimately became a popularly cited critic of ape language studies.

=== Koko ===
In 1972, Francine "Penny" Patterson, inspired by a lecture she attended by Allen and Beatrix Gardner, began a program to teach sign language to a lowlands gorilla named Koko. Unlike the Gardners, she did not limit her English speech around Koko. Koko mastered approximately 1,000 signs before her death in 2018. But her well-publicized achievements ignited significant controversy among scientists, who questioned whether she was truly using a "language" or simply responding to Patterson's prompts. It is generally accepted that Koko did not demonstrate the use of syntax or grammar, key characteristics of language.

== Visual symbols ==
Some researchers used plastic tokens or other visual symbols in an effort to teach apes human language. Psychologist David Premack worked with Sarah and other chimpanzees to develop a vocabulary using several dozen plastic tokens. Premack began the research in 1964 at Yerkes Laboratory in Florida while working to complete his Ph.D. in psychology and philosophy. His focus was on studying what separates humans from other species.

The most accomplished of Premack's chimps, Sarah, learned to answer simple questions and could make and carry out requests. But Premack noted that she did not ask questions herself, and argued that this severely limited chimps' ability to communicate. Other researchers in primate cognition have found evidence of ape inquiries while noting that the structure of their queries may not look exactly like human question-asking. For example, researcher Cat Hobaiter said, "If a chimpanzee looks its handler in the eyes and points to a banana, it may be interpreted that the ape is asking to have the banana."

Premack documented his work with chimps in a book co-authored with his wife, science writer Ann James Premack, The Mind of an Ape (1983). Reflecting back on his chimpanzee language work in 2007, Premack was dismissive:

"I had no interest in chimpanzees or language... There was no definition of language: it was mumbo jumbo from the philosophers of the day. The only way I could ever understand it was to get an appropriate nonhuman and cut language into pieces and install them one by one... It all boils down to next to nothing. It’s all nonsense."

=== Kanzi ===
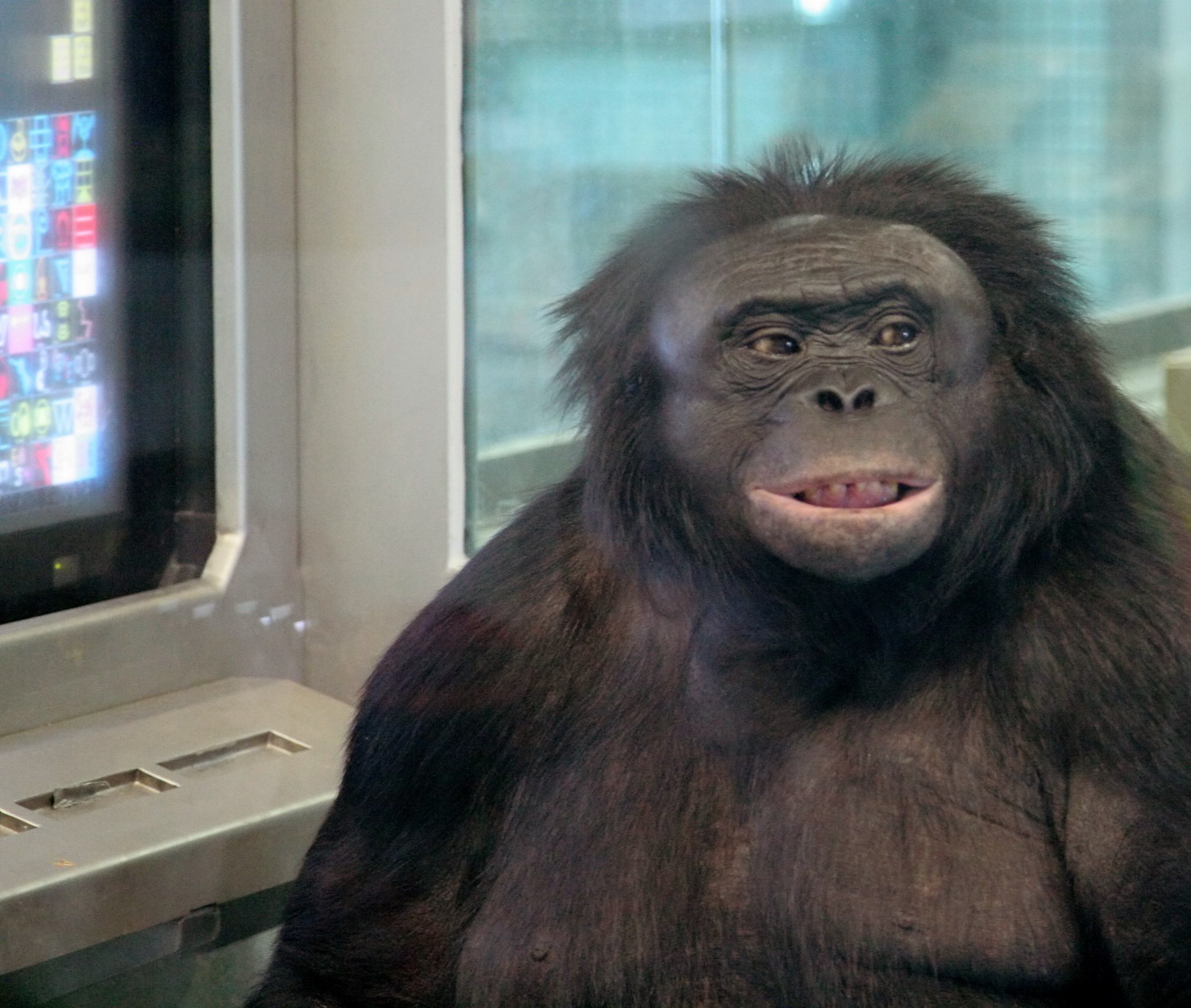
Kanzi learned hundreds of arbitrary symbols representing words, objects, and familiar people (including the generic "Visitor").

Kanzi, a bonobo, learned to communicate with a lexigram board at first by eavesdropping on the lessons researcher Sue Savage-Rumbaugh was giving to his adoptive mother. Kanzi used the lexigram board by pushing symbols that stand for words. The board was wired to a computer and symbols were vocalized out loud once pressed.

One day, Rumbaugh used the computer to say to Kanzi, "Can you make the dog bite the snake?" It is believed Kanzi had never heard this sentence before. In answering the question, Kanzi searched among the objects present until he found a toy dog and a toy snake, put the snake in the dog's mouth, and used his thumb and finger to close the dog's mouth over the snake. In 2001, Alexander Fiske-Harrison, writing in the Financial Times, observed that Kanzi was "asked by an invisible interrogator through head-phones (to avoid cueing) to identify 35 different items in 180 trials. His success rate was 93 percent." In further testing, beginning when he was 7 1/2 years old, Kanzi was asked 416 complex questions, responding correctly over 74% of the time. Kanzi has been observed verbalizing a meaningful noun to his sister.

Kanzi relied highly on the lexigrams for communication, and frequently used them to specify where he wanted to go, or an item he wanted to have. He did this by expressing his goal (location or object) first, and his action (go, chase, carry, give, etc.) last. This notified researchers that Kanzi's way of communicating was different from that of spoken English, especially because Kanzi would communicate many of his action words using simple gestures. In addition, Kanzi was frequently seen linking two action words together using the lexigrams, like "I Tickle", "Chase Hide", or "Chase Bite". These word combinations are not necessarily structured in a way that humans would use spoken English, but they closely resemble lists, consisting of preferred actions, in preferred order of Kanzi's social play. Because of this inconsistency of Kanzi's use of language with the spoken English language, many question whether Kanzi's understanding of English "crosses the boundary with true language".

== Criticism and controversy ==
=== Language abilities ===
Controversy in the 1970s and early 1980s centered on different understandings of language. The Gardners, Roger Fouts and Penny Patterson – all psychologists – operated from a lay person's understanding of language as simply a means of communication (as in the popular term "body language"). They succeeded in teaching apes a number of signs, but doing so led to inflated claims about "talking apes" in the mainstream media.

Linguists understood language as a complex, structured system of communication defined by several key characteristics. Teaching apes to use isolated signs was, from this perspective, nothing to do with language. Many argued (in line with Terrace) that the apes merely demonstrated a form of operant conditioning, similar to pigeons trained to peck buttons in a specific order. So, when the psychologists trumpeted apes' acquisition of speech or language, other scholars – especially linguists – criticized these claims and pointed out problems with them. The most significant and enduring criticism regarded the lack of evidence supporting great apes' use of syntax and grammatical sentence structure. Without demonstrating the use of sentences, the apes could not be said to have acquired language.

The Gardners did not set out to focus on sentence creation. Terrace, however, did. The Nim Chimpsky study had been designed to test a chimp's ability to create sentences. Its report of negative results came as a shock to the field. A critic of the ape language research organized a "Clever Hans" conference in 1980 trumpeting the Nim study and suggesting that scientists working on animal language were charlatans. To Irene Pepperberg, a research associate who had been working with a parrot named Alex, the conference came as a wakeup call, pushing her to avoid claims about "language" and sticking to "vocal communication." As a result of the Terrace study and the subsequent conference, funding for ape language research abruptly evaporated.

With their funding gone, researchers turned to new projects. Some, feeling responsible to maintain care of their animal subjects, largely abandoned science. Penny Patterson, for example, turned to PR work and children's media to raise funds to care for Koko and gorilla Michael. Roger Fouts struggled to show results for an NIH grant tied to Washoe teaching her foster baby signs. (Fouts was accused by one of his staff of faking data; another former grad student, Sue Savage-Rumbaugh, criticized him for over-interpretation.) In the 1980s, he partnered with Jane Goodall on a campaign to improve conditions for chimpanzees in NIH-funded labs, an effort that effectively alienated him from fellow scientists.

The Gardners, unlike Fouts and Patterson, seemed to show little concern for the chimps' welfare after their studies ended. The Gardners were seen as the most data-driven and rigorous of the sign-language researchers. In 1989, they edited a volume that incorporated new data and addressed earlier criticisms of their work. Teaching Sign Language to Chimpanzees described "the continuity between human behavior and the rest of animal animal" and found "no barriers to be broken, no chasms to be bridged, only unknown territory to be charted." In contrast to earlier studies, the book was favorably reviewed by scholars.

=== Ethics ===
The 2011 documentary Project Nim drew public attention to the plight of apes used in human language studies. In its aftermath, a new critique gained favor.

This critique argued that isolating apes from their species and drilling them in the communication method of another (Homo sapiens) was a misguided effort to sate human curiosity, not science. The apes involved, largely isolated from their species, showed recognizable signs of trauma. Every ape subject refused to participate in language lessons to some degree. Making assumptions about ape's abilities with involuntary subjects forced to live in highly unnatural conditions was seen as not only unscientific but ethically wrong.

A 2024 report in the journal Scientific Reports about chimpanzee vocal communication drew upon both scientific and ethical critiques. It called for a reevaluation of ape communication skills, noting that absence of evidence is not evidence of absence – particularly when based on a few untrustworthy representatives (untrustworthy due to the "neglect and cruelty" inflicted on the apes).

== Contemporary research ==
Among primates, autonomous behaviors such as gestures, body posture, facial expressions and vocalizations have been observed to convey information to other animals, revealing emotions or alerts about potential danger. Affiliative behaviors like grooming are used to promote group cohesion and individual status, while displays of aggression create divisions among groups. Humans, by contrast, have developed a reliance on verbal language. Primatologist Tetsuro Matsuzawa proposes in his cognitive tradeoff hypothesis that humans exchanged short-term and working memory for better language skills over their evolution.

== See also ==
- Alex (parrot)
- Animal cognition
- Animal communication
- Animal language
- Animal training
- Biosemiotics
- Cognitive tradeoff hypothesis
- Human-animal communication
- Language – as it pertains to humans
- Language acquisition
- Operant conditioning
- Origin of language
- Primate cognition
- Proto-language (glottogony)
- Theory of mind
- Yerkish

=== Researchers ===
- Roger Fouts
- Francine Patterson
- David Premack
- Sue Savage-Rumbaugh

=== Research subjects ===
- Ai (chimpanzee)
- Chantek (orangutan)
- Kanzi (bonobo)
- Lana (chimpanzee)
- Koko (gorilla)
- Loulis (chimpanzee)
- Lucy (chimpanzee)
- Moja (chimpanzee)
- Gua (chimpanzee)
- Michael (gorilla)
- Nim Chimpsky (chimpanzee)
- Panbanisha (bonobo)
- Sarah (chimpanzee)
- Washoe (chimpanzee)
- Viki (chimpanzee)
