= Mary Lee Jensvold =

American animal communication expert

Mary Lee Jensvold is a senior lecturer at Central Washington University. She was the Director of the Chimpanzee and Human Communication Institute (CHCI) located on the campus of Central Washington University. CHCI was the home of the chimpanzee Washoe and four other chimpanzees who use the signs of American Sign Language to communicate with one another and their human caregivers.

Jensvold studies communication and other behaviors in chimpanzees. She had been working with Washoe and her family since 1986. In 1985 she received a B.A. in Psychology from the University of Oregon, in 1989 a M.S. in Experimental Psychology from Central Washington University, and in 1996 a Ph.D. in Experimental Psychology from the University of Nevada, Reno.

She specializes in ethological studies of great apes, animal intelligence, communication, and language. Her studies include chimpanzee conversational skills, imaginary play in chimpanzees, and environmental enrichment for captive chimpanzees. She is currently associate director at Fauna Foundation. Previously, she was Senior Lecturer in the Primate Behavior and Ecology Program and the Anthropology Department at Central Washington University. She also serves on the Advisory Council of METI (Messaging Extraterrestrial Intelligence).

== See also ==
- Loulis
- Deborah Fouts
- Roger Fouts
- Koko
