= Maurice K. Temerlin =

American psychologist

- Born: January 15, 1924; Oklahoma, U.S.
- Died: January 15, 1988 (aged 64); Oregon, U.S.
- Known for: Work with Lucy, Research into Effects of Diagnostic Labels
- Scientific career
- Fields: Psychology, psychotherapy
- Workplaces: University of Oklahoma

Maurice K. Temerlin (January 15, 1924 – January 15, 1988), was a psychologist and author.

== Work and research ==
=== Suggestion Effects of Psychiatric Labels ===
In the late 1960s and early 1970s, Temerlin published a series of articles examining the effect of diagnostic labels. Temerlin and his colleagues asked clinicians to evaluate and diagnose a man. Before making their diagnosis, they were told that an 'expert' had previously diagnosed the individual as 'psychotic'. The man was in fact a mentally healthy individual who was a confederate of the experimenters. Even though the man did not present with symptoms of psychosis, many clinicians agreed with the 'expert' diagnosis.

=== Work with Lucy ===
With his wife Jane W. Temerlin, Temerlin raised a chimpanzee named Lucy who was owned by the Institute for Primate Studies at the University of Oklahoma at Norman, Oklahoma. Temerlin and his wife raised Lucy in their home as if she were a human child, teaching her to eat with silverware, dress herself, flip through magazines, and sit in a chair at the dinner table. She was taught American Sign Language by primatologist Roger Fouts as part of an ape language project. Temerlin wrote the book Lucy: Growing Up Human: A Chimpanzee Daughter in a Psychotherapist's Family, analyzing the chimp's behaviour and describing her life.

=== 'Psychotherapy Cults' ===
Temerlin collaborated academically with his wife on articles, including "Psychotherapy Cults: An Iatrogenic Perversion," which was published in Psychotherapy: Theory, Research, and Practice. The work remains highly regarded, and is cited by numerous academicians, including Robert S. Pepper, Michael Langone, Guy Fielding and Sue Llewelyn, David A. Halperin, and Arnold Markowitz, and Dennis Tourish and Pauline Irving.

== Publications ==
=== Books ===
- Lucy: Growing Up Human: A Chimpanzee Daughter in a Psychotherapist's Family, Temerlin, Maurice. 1976 ISBN 0-8314-0045-5
- Labelling Madness, Contributor, "Suggestion Effects in Psychiatric Diagnosis," Thomas J. Scheff, (ed.), Prentice-Hall, Inc., Englewood Cliffs, New Jersey, 1975.
- The Social Psychology of Clinical Diagnosis, University of Oklahoma, Dept. of Psychology 1966

=== Articles ===
- "Some Hazards of the Therapeutic Relationship", Jane W. Temerlin, M. S. W., Maurice K. Temerlin, Ph. D., Cultic Studies Journal
- Diagnostic Bias in Community Mental Health, Community Mental Health Journal, Volume 6, Number 2 / April, 1970

== See also ==
- Lucy (chimpanzee)
- List of cult and new religious movement researchers
