= Lucy (chimpanzee) =

Chimpanzee raised as a human (1964–1987)

- Lucy hugging her caretaker Janis Carter
- Species: chimpanzee
- Born: 1964
- Died: 1987 (aged 22–23)
- Owners: Institute for Primate Studies in Oklahoma, raised by Maurice K. Temerlin and Jane Temerlin

Lucy (1964–1987) was a chimpanzee owned by the Institute for Primate Studies in Oklahoma and raised by Maurice K. Temerlin, a psychotherapist and professor at the University of Oklahoma, and his wife, Jane.

== Background ==
Temerlin and his wife raised Lucy as if she were a human child, teaching her to eat with silverware, dress herself, flip through magazines, and sit at the dinner table in a chair. She was taught signs taken from American Sign Language by primatologist Roger Fouts as part of an ape language project and eventually learned 140 signs. She appeared in Life magazine, where she became famous for drinking straight gin, rearing a cat, and using Playgirl and a vacuum cleaner for sexual gratification. Subsequently, the Temerlins introduced her for the first time to a male chimpanzee. She was frightened and did not relate to him, let alone find him attractive. Fouts has written that when he arrived at Lucy's home at 8:30 every morning, Lucy would greet him with a hug, take the kettle, fill it with water, find two cups and tea bags, and serve the tea.

By the time she was 12 Lucy had become very strong and was very destructive in the Temerlin house. Eventually she was shipped to a chimpanzee rehabilitation center in The Gambia, accompanied by University of Oklahoma psychology graduate student Janis Carter. Carter intended to stay with Lucy for only three weeks to ease her transition to an outdoor habitat. Stella Marsden, who ran the chimpanzee rehabilitation project, stated that Lucy’s age and background meant she was not a suitable candidate for rehabilitation. A more humane option for Lucy was to retire with other chimpanzees who could not be rehabilitated either and to continue to receive the food, magazines, toys, et cetera that she had been accustomed to from birth. For years, Lucy was unable to relate to the other chimpanzees in the rehabilitation center and never reproduced, displaying sexual attraction only to humans. Lucy showed many signs of depression, including a refusal to eat, and expressed "hurt" via sign language. Though her adopted Temerlin parents had stayed with Lucy for only a few weeks in The Gambia, Janis Carter remained at the Center for years, devoting a great deal of time to helping Lucy assimilate into life in the wild.

A year after leaving Lucy, Carter returned with a few of Lucy's belongings such as her mirror. Lucy and a group of chimpanzees greeted her and Lucy embraced her fervently, then left with the other chimpanzees without turning back, which Carter interpreted as Lucy having adapted to life as a chimpanzee. One year after that, Carter returned and found Lucy's skeleton with hands missing and head separated from the rest of the body, and no sign of skin or hair, from which Carter concluded that Lucy's lack of fear of humans may have made her susceptible to poaching. However, others who had been intimately involved in Lucy's rehabilitation question this possibility, because the skeleton, in its advanced state of decomposition, could not provide evidence of poaching over some other cause of death.

== News coverage ==
Lucy's life-story was the subject of a 2010 one-hour Radiolab episode entitled ‘Lucy’. Excerpts of this show were also included in This American Life, under the title ‘Parent Trap’. Both stories focus on Lucy's lifelong emotional stress.

In 2021 an HBO Max documentary film, Lucy the Human Chimp, was made.

== Books by Temerlin ==
- Lucy: Growing Up Human: A Chimpanzee Daughter in a Psychotherapist's Family, Temerlin, Maurice. 1976 ISBN 0-8314-0045-5
- Labelling Madness, Contributor, "Suggestion Effects in Psychiatric Diagnosis," Thomas J. Scheff, (ed.), Prentice-Hall, Inc., Englewood Cliffs, New Jersey, 1975.
- The Social Psychology of Clinical Diagnosis, University of Oklahoma, Dept. of Psychology 1966

== See also ==
- List of individual apes
