= Next of Kin =

Next of kin is a person's closest living blood relative or relatives.

Next of Kin may also refer to:

== Film and television ==
- The Next of Kin, a 1942 British film often called Next of Kin
- Next of Kin (1982 film), an Australian/New Zealand film
- Next of Kin (1984 film), a Canadian film
- Next of Kin (1989 film), an action film
- Next of Kin (TV series), a 1995 to 1997 British sitcom
- Next of Kin (2008 film), an American film starring Bess Armstrong
- "Next of Kin" (Arrow), an episode of Arrow
- Next of Kin (2018 TV series), a 2018 British thriller-drama series starring Archie Panjabi
- Next of Kin (2021 film), a 2021 supernatural horror film from the Paranormal Activity film series

== Other uses ==
- Next of Kin (nonfiction), a book by primate researcher Roger Fouts about his experiences with chimpanzee Washoe
- Next of Kin (novel), a 1959 science fiction novel by Eric Frank Russell
- Next of Kin, an essay by David Sedaris collected in the 1997 book Naked
- Next of Kin, a 2014 novel by Dan Wells
- Next of Kin (band), a British pop rock band made up of three brothers
- "Next of Kin", a song by Alvvays from their Alvvays (album)
