= Next of Kin (Fouts book) =

1997 book by Roger Fouts

Next of Kin is a 1997 book by Roger Fouts combining his experiences with Washoe and other chimpanzees who learned American Sign Language, and a polemic in favor of great ape personhood.
