= B. F. Barge =

American politician

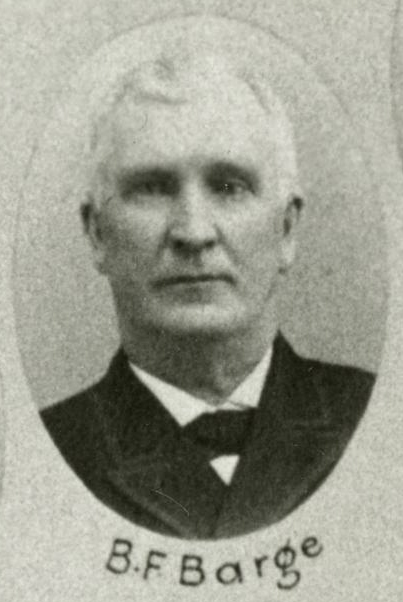
- Barge in 1895

Member of the Washington House of Representatives for the 18th district
- In office 1895–1897

Personal details
- Born: February 22, 1834 Concord, Massachusetts, United States
- Died: February 10, 1926 (aged 91) Yakima, Washington, United States
- Party: Republican

Benjamin Franklin Barge (February 22, 1834 – February 10, 1926) was an American politician and educator in the state of Washington. He served in the Washington House of Representatives from 1895 to 1897. He was the first principal of Washington State Normal School, today known as Central Washington University. and had served as a teacher and school superintendent before moving to Washington state.

Central Washington University's first building is named Barge Hall in honor of Barge. Barge Hall was added to the National Register of Historic Places in 1976.
