= Fauna Foundation =

Chimpanzee sanctuary in Canada

The Fauna Foundation is the only accredited chimpanzee sanctuary in Canada. Located just outside Chambly, on the South Shore of Montreal, the story of Fauna started in 1990 by Gloria Grow and Dr. Richard Allan on their 150-acre (0.61 km^{2}) farm. Later in 1997, it became the Fauna Foundation. Its primary objective, the rescue and care of chimpanzees who have been used in research, began in the wake of the shutdown of LEMSIP.

It is the first sanctuary to accept chimpanzees with SIV.

Fauna Sanctuary is accredited by the Global Federation of Animal Sanctuaries and is a registered 501(c)(3) not-for-profit charity in the United States.

In 2012, author Andrew Westoll won the Charles Taylor Prize for his non-fiction book The Chimps of Fauna Sanctuary, detailing his encounters with the chimpanzees at the foundation.

In August 2013, chimpanzees Loulis and Tatu from the Chimpanzee and Human Communication Institute (CHCI) moved to the sanctuary.
