= W. S. Small =

American experimental psychologist (1870–1943)

Willard Stanton Small (August 24, 1870 – 1943) was an experimental psychologist. Small was the first person to use the behavior of rats in mazes as a measure of learning. In 1900 and 1901, he published journal two of three in "Experimental Study of the Mental Processes of the Rat" in the American Journal of Psychology. The maze he used in this study was an adaptation of the Hampton Court Maze, as suggested to him by Edmund Sanford at Clark University.

== Education and career ==
Small received a Bachelor's degree from Tufts College in 1897 and pursued a doctorate degree in comparative psychology at Clark University, working under Edmund Sanford. While at Clark, Small conducted what most historians believe to be the first studies of rats learning mazes. His research focused on the formation of associations, which he believed to be the basis of animal intelligence. Small also believed any experimental assessment of intelligence in animals should be conducted in a way that does not disturb the animals’ “natural proclivities.” Using this method, he hoped to develop a better understanding of the animal mind, as well as differences among species and their behavior. In addition to this, Small found it was more beneficial to report the naturalistic descriptions of the observed behaviors rather than quantitative data. Upon completing his graduate work, Small took faculty positions at Michigan State Normal College and Los Angeles State Normal School. Later, he assumed more administrative roles as an educational administrator in San Diego, Paterson New Jersey, and Washington D.C. Finally, he became the Dean of the University of Maryland in 1923 until 1940.

== Maze learning and rats ==
An example of The Hampton Court maze Small used to create his famous rat maze.

When beginning his research, Small’s initial goal was to work with individual species as he predicted “generalizations would come in due time.” Small was inspired by Edward Thorndike's well-publicized work with rats and puzzle boxes. His graduate advisor, Edmund Sanford, suggested that since rats like to tunnel and since they are capable of homing in the dark, mazes would provide an appropriate means for studying rat learning. Small also argued that this apparatus allowed the rats to exploit their instinctive tendencies and previous sensorimotor experience in solving problems. Small used an illustration of the Hampton Maze from Encyclopedia Britannica to develop three mazes. His investigations ignited a craze and inspired researchers for decades. In order to describe the rats' behavior, Small recorded observations as they occurred, focusing more on the rats' behaviors rather than objective completion times. In particular he learned that the male rats had a different behavior rate when not intimidated. In term when the rats are in their habitat, there are other factors or rats involved. In the lab you can keep them focused in their own environment on one thing getting through maze (Thorndike, E. L. (1901).

=== Primary Findings ===
Small initially explored habituation and concluded that wild rats were more active and appeared more frightened than the lab-bred, domesticated white rats. His first studies showed that hungry rats, given repeated opportunities, took more than an hour to find food at the end of the maze on the first trial, but got progressively better and could complete the maze in 30 seconds after several more. Small also noted that the animals habituated to the environment and appeared less anxious over time. Throughout his experimentation, Small would allow the rats to explore the maze overnight, with no reward, allowing them to become more familiar with the environment.

In the next set of experiments, Small added a door to the box to test how the rats were able to adapt to the change. Similar results were found, with the rats able to decrease the amount of time they took to find food behind the door. However, in cases of extreme hunger, the rats would dig in front of the door, even though the movement was not useful. This suggested that digging for food was an automatic response for rats.

Next, Small tested to see if the rats were able to recognize and differentiate between the box with the door and without. What he found was that one of the rats could recognize the box without the door but not discriminate between the two. However, another rat showed evidence of recognizing and discriminating between the two boxes. At the point, Small confirmed a suspicion that rats could have variable levels of intelligence.

To discover how rats habituate to change, Small made it so the door to the food in the box did not spring open. The rats would have to crawl under the door to get to the food. The rat Small deemed to be the most intelligent was able to gradually figure out the way to get the food quicker with less fear, showing evidence of habituation. Small then removed the box for 40 days to test the rat's memory. After replacing the box, the rat was able to complete the maze in seconds, demonstrating that the rat was capable of long-term memory.

Next, Small wondered if new rats not exposed to the maze were able to learn it just as quickly. Using four new rats, Small found that there tended to be a "lead rat" that would complete the task of opening the door to find food, while the other rats crowded around the spot, demonstrating that they were imitating the lead rat's behavior. As the lead rat was removed, the next lead rat would form, opening the door quicker with each trial for the other rats to go get food. Small concluded that the rats must have some sort of tendency to imitate each other.

To test this theory of imitation, Small used two rats from previous trials that elected not to complete the maze. After being allowed to run the maze, one rat did show evidence of learning it (judged by reduced completion times). However, Small could not demonstrate that these rats imitated each other, as the other rat did not learn to complete the maze.

== Implications of maze learning and rats ==
The study is considered one of the most influential studies in psychology. The maze specifically was seen as a useful device, being used by animal psychologists through the 1920s and onward. A notable study is James Porter's work in Indiana University using a modified maze with sparrows. Small was also able to show that studying animals was useful for psychology to compare their behavior to humans.

This research contributed to the field of experimental psychology and animals. Small’s work with rats allowed him to be compared to well known psychologists such as Edward Thorndike. While his works did all have strong premise, there were short comings to his work in the mazes. For instance, the rats ran free overnight learning the turns, and alleys of the maze.(Thorndike, E. L. (1901) Review of Experimental Study of the Mental Processes of the Rat Psychological Review, 643–644.). Although, there were loose ends in the study it didn’t take away from the findings that are still used today. That rats make behavioral decisions based on environments and not rewards.

His influence toward studying learning in animals is evident in the early writings of Watson, who emphasized the study of individual species. Shortly after the publication of these studies, application of this maze with other species became more prevalent.
