= Jan Moor-Jankowski =

Polish primatologist (1924–2005)

Jan Moor-Jankowski (February 5, 1924 – August 27, 2005) was a Polish-born American primatologist and a fighter for Polish independence against Nazi Germany. Dr. Moor-Jankowski was Director of the Laboratory for Experimental Medicine and Surgery in Primates (LEMSIP) which he founded in 1965, the Director of the World Health Organization Collaborating Center for Hematology of Primate Apes, and the editor-in-chief of the Journal of Medical Primatology.

Moor-Jankowski was the author and editor of many books, monographs and periodicals, and more than 200 papers on human genetics, hemophilia, blood groups, immunology and primate medical experimentation.

== Early life ==
Moor-Jankowski was born in Warsaw and grew up in Częstochowa. His father was an engineer and an architect, and his mother a concert pianist. When his mother's cousin developed cancer, at the age of five, Moor-Jankowski decided that he wanted to be a research physician in order to find a cure.

When Germany invaded Poland in 1939, Moor-Jankowski joined the Polish Army, at the age of 15, and his family moved back to Warsaw. When Poland was overrun, the family moved back to Częstochowa. With the Polish schools closed by the Nazis, he obtained a high school diploma without official government recognition.

When his father disappeared in 1942, Moor-Jankowski joined the Polish Resistance. He would later write that he wanted something of himself to carry on, and so he fathered a son, Tadeusz, who was born in 1942. He saw the child once, when he was two weeks old, but did not see him again for 35 years.

Moor-Jankowski was fighting in Warsaw Uprising. He was injured by an explosive bullet in his knee, and he was forced to move from hospital to hospital, pretending to be a German officer in order to survive. Eventually, his impersonation was discovered, and he was imprisoned by the Germans, and then later by the Soviets. He finally escaped to Switzerland, where he earned a medical degree.

== Career ==
Moor-Jankowski eventually moved to the United States, where he worked mainly at a New York University primate lab. It was there that he used chimpanzees for medical research, including work on the discovery of the first Hepatitis B vaccine and the development of techniques to freeze blood for storage.

He was elected to the French Academy of Medicine in 1995, replacing Linus Pauling as the only American member.

=== The Journal of Medical Primatology ===
Moor-Jankowski founded the Journal of Medical Primatology.

The journal published a letter from an animal rights advocate which criticized the Austrian drug company Immuno AG for its plans to capture wild chimpanzees for research. When Immuno AG sued for libel, Moor-Jankowski refused to settle the lawsuit, instead battling for seven years, with two appeals to the New York State Supreme Court and one to the United States Supreme Court. He eventually prevailed in the state courts, in a decision which many hailed as a victory for letters to the editor against libel lawsuits. The litigation, however dragged on for years, while Immuno AG petitioned the court for a rehearing. One of the longest, most bitter and expensive libel suits finally ended when Immuno AG's petition was ultimately denied on June 3, 1991.

== Recognition ==
Moor-Jankowski was presented with the Trumpeldor medal by the Israeli Prime Minister's Office, Life Sciences Division in 1971, and the G. Bude medal by the College of France in 1979. In 1984, he was awarded the Knight of the French Order Ordre National du Mérite for resistance activity in World War II and for scientific achievements.

== See also ==
- Dian Fossey
- Biruté Galdikas
- Jane Goodall
- Great Ape research ban
