= Comparative neuropsychology =

Comparative neuropsychology refers to an approach used for understanding human brain functions. It involves the direct evaluation of clinical neurological populations by employing experimental methods originally developed for use with nonhuman animals.

Over many decades of animal research, methods were perfected to study the effects of well-defined brain lesions on specific behaviors, and later the tasks were modified for human use. Generally the modifications involve changing the reward from food to money, but standard administration of the tasks in humans still involves minimal instructions, thus necessitating a degree of procedural learning in human and nonhuman animals alike.

Currently, comparative neuropsychology is used with neurological patients to link specific deficits with localized areas of the brain.

The comparative neuropsychological approach employs simple tasks that can be mastered without relying upon language skills. Precisely because these simple paradigms do not require linguistic strategies for solution, they are especially useful for working with patients whose language skills are compromised, or whose cognitive skills may be minimal.

Comparative neuropsychology contrasts with the traditional approach of using tasks that rely upon linguistic skills, and that were designed to study human cognition. Because important ambiguities about its heuristic value had not been addressed empirically, only recently has comparative neuropsychology become popular for implementation with brain-damaged patients.

Within the past decade, comparative neuropsychology has had prevalent use as a framework for comparing and contrasting the performances of disparate neurobehavioral populations on similar tasks.

== History ==
Comparative neuropsychology involves the study of brain-behavior relationships by applying experimental paradigms, used extensively in animal laboratories, for testing human clinical populations. Popular paradigms include delayed reaction tasks, discrimination and reversal learning tasks, and matching- and nonmatching-to-sample. These tasks adapt behavioral paradigms used with nonhuman animals to measure cognitive function and dysfunction in humans. Such tasks were perfected on experimental animals having well defined brain lesions, and adapted for human neurological patients. The comparative aspects of such approach resides in the analogy between animals with brain lesions and human patients with lesions in homologous areas of the brain. Examples are represented by the comparison between the brain of laboratory animals (primarily non human primates and mice) with the one of people with damages resulting from excessive alcohol use.

== George Ettlinger ==
George Ettlinger was one of the few who actively combined human and animal research, and he did so consistently throughout his scientific career. Ettinger work focused on the importance of the inferior temporal neocortex in visual discrimination learning and memory in macaque monkeys, and on the importance of ventral temporal lobe in vision. Ettinger animals models carried inferotemporal or latero-ventral prestriate ablation. In 1966 George Ettlinger, together with the psychologist Colin Blakemore and the neurosurgeon Murray Falconer, described the results of a study on correlation between pre-operative intelligence and the severity of mesial temporal sclerosis in temporal lobe specimens excised to treat intractable epilepsy. Such study It is known as a forerunner of what has become one of the potentially most interesting techniques for exploring the relationship between certain aspects of human memory and temporal lobe structures.

== See also ==
- Comparative psychology
- Experimental psychology
- Neuropathology
- Neuroscience
- Psychology
