= Winthrop Kellogg =

American psychologist

Winthrop Niles Kellogg
- Born: April 13, 1898; Mount Vernon, New York, U.S.
- Died: June 22, 1972 (aged 74); Ft. Lauderdale, Florida, U.S.
- Education: Indiana University Bloomington, B.A. Columbia University, M.A., Ph.D.
- Known for: The Ape and the Child, dolphin sonar/echolocation, learning defined as a function (a change in behavior)

Winthrop Niles Kellogg (April 13, 1898 – June 22, 1972) was an American comparative psychologist who studied the behavior of a number of intelligent animal species.

== Early life ==
Winthrop Niles Kellogg was born in 1898 in Mount Vernon, New York. He began undergraduate study in 1916 at Cornell University for one year before joining the Great War (World War I) in Europe. For two years he served as part of the American Expeditionary Forces in the US Army Air Service, earning him the prestigious Croix de Guerre. After the war, he returned to undergraduate study at Indiana University Bloomington. There he met Luella Dorothy Agger of Indianapolis, whom he would marry in 1920.

Kellogg graduated from Indiana in 1922 majoring in philosophy and psychology. Kellogg tried out several jobs, including a journalist, but was persuaded by Luella's uncle to have a go in academia. Kellogg followed this advice enrolling in the psychology program at Columbia University, where he would receive his Master's in 1927 and his doctorate just two years later in 1929. His doctorate was directed by Robert S. Woodworth and compared psychophysical methods. Even as a graduate student, Kellogg was a prolific researcher. He published four single-authored articles and one co-authored in 1928–29 in addition to his dissertation. He published an additional three articles in 1930 and another five in 1931. Kellogg sustained this level of activity throughout his academic career. This level of productivity likely aided in his hiring offer by Indiana soon after receiving his PhD.

== Indiana University ==
At Indiana University Bloomington, Kellogg built a research laboratory for studying conditioned behavior in dogs. With help from colleagues and students, he established an extensive program to study the physiological and conditional responses of dogs with their cerebral cortex removed. The laboratory provided a great opportunity for students to get adequate training in experimental research and to work on specific research questions within a "well-defined research paradigm."

Kellogg was an innovative and creative spirit. He had a knack for designing new equipment, improving old equipment, creating new modes of data collection, and developing new surgical techniques". Among his publications, some concern these sorts of developments and technological innovation.

At Indiana University, Kellogg was involved in a very diverse set of research topics, which stemmed in part from student interest. Though he was involved in a great variety of topics, his research on conditioning and learning resulted in approximately 50 publications. Some of the topics within conditioning and learning that he pursued included "the bilateral transfer of conditioning...the effects of various drugs on learning...and spinal conditioning". Kellogg was an atheorist and used his conditioning studies to show that four different theories of learning: "trial-and-error learning, Gestalt insight, conditioning, and sign learning" were no different, and instead they were highlighting only parts of the whole situation of learning and argued that learning be defined as a function – a change in behavior – and not a structure – a change in the nervous system.

=== Spinal conditioning ===
In the lab, Kellogg questioned whether dogs' transected spinal cords could exhibit a conditioned response "below the point of transsection". What he was looking for was a muscle twitch as the conditioned response in one of the exposed hamstring muscles. The twitch had been previously observed by Shurrager and Culler in 1940. Kellogg and his students could not produce any type of spinal conditioning and concluded that the twitch observed by Shurrager and Culler was just: "a basic response to a conditioned electric shock stimulus applied to another part of the body (either to another limb or to the tail) and that an unconditioned electric shock stimulus applied to the limb in question was unnecessary. It was argued further that changes in this muscle twitch with training should be regarded simply as sensitization of a reflex".

=== Other work ===
Being the comparative psychologist he was, he conducted what is believed to be the "first experimental study of learning by snakes". In 1936 he published "A Description of Maze Learning by Water Snakes…".

He conducted studies on a number of other topics: "fear in rats, mice, and birds (1931a), advertising (1932a), emotion as it affects muscular steadiness (1932b), fetal activity (1941), and a learning curve for flying an airplane (1946)".

Of all his work at Indiana, none would bring him as much attention as his comparative study involving an infant chimpanzee named Gua.

=== The Ape and the Child ===
Soon after arriving at Indiana, Kellogg began to plan an ambitious project concerning the comparative psychology of primates. No other investigation in his career would bring him quite as much attention as this project would. In the article "Humanizing the Ape", he argued for the necessity of comparative developmental studies of humans and non-human primates. Kellogg was interested in determining the "relative influence of nature and nurture on behavior". In the article, Kellogg proposed to raise an infant chimpanzee with his own infant son Donald.

Kellogg generated this idea during his graduate time at Columbia and it is supposed that the idea was sparked by an article on the "wolf children" of India. Kellogg argued these children, and those like them, were born with normal intelligence as it would be unlikely that they would have survived. He asserted that the children learned to live like wolves because that was "what their environment demanded of them". Kellogg "believed in the strong impact of early experience and the existence of critical periods in development, and he maintained that the problem with civilizing feral children was the difficulty of overturning the habits learned early in life". Placing a "human infant of normal intelligence in an uncivilized environment and [observing…] its development in that environment" would be both unethical and not legal. The only other way to test this question of environment versus heredity would be to take a "wild animal and place it in the civilized environment of a human home". There had been earlier attempts to get at this question concerning civilized apes, but none met the strict criteria Kellogg thought necessary, especially the criterion of a "situation that would assure that the animal was always treated as a human and never as an animal, particularly a pet".

It would be Robert Yerkes who would help Kellogg with his plan. Kellogg received the Social Science Research Council fellowship to work at the Yale Anthropoid Station in Florida in order to prepare for the project in 1931. That summer the Kellogg family moved to Florida. To his surprise, soon after arriving Kellogg learned that another post-doctoral fellow Carlyle Jacobsen had been studying an infant ape since its birth a year prior. To Kellogg's benefit, there had been no clear attempt to "humanize the ape".

Shortly after arriving, and earlier than expected, a 7.5-month-old female infant chimpanzee joined the Kellogg family; her name was Gua. Donald (10 months old) and Gua were treated as equally "as possible, being dressed, bathed, fed, and taught in a similar manner". Kellogg conducted a number of tests to measure their development as regularly as possible. As one might expect, Gua grew faster than Donald and even learned some behaviors more quickly. Gua seemed more dependent on human interaction and support than Donald.

Though Gua progressed quite impressively in acquiring everyday human behaviors, she did not meet Kellogg's expectations, with the reason being that she made no effort to communicate via human language. After nine months of work, the study ended in the spring of 1932. This was four years and three months short of his initial five-year plan. Gua stayed in Florida while the Kelloggs returned to Indiana.

This experiment would prove to be one of his most pioneering studies. For nine months straight Kellogg maintained identical rearing conditions for Donald and Gua and would use tasks to test the infants comparatively and developmentally.

Though the very heart of the project "was an attempt to discover how human a chimpanzee could become when reared in a human environment". Kellogg had formulated it to be the definitive investigation explaining the interaction between heredity and environment. The study proved to demonstrate the limits of heredity regardless of environment, in addition to developmental gains induced by enriched environments. As stated earlier, Gua never met Kellogg's expectation of human language as she was never able to imitate human vocalizations. Contrastingly, the same could not be said for Donald as he imitated a few of Gua's vocalizations, including the food bark when food was presented or nearby.

"Gua, treated as an human child, behaved like a human child except when the structure of her body and brain prevented her. This being shown, the experiment was discontinued."

A portion of the results was presented at the annual meeting of the Midwestern Psychological Association, and Kellogg began writing a book with Luella. The Ape and the Child was published in 1933. It documents the study very well.

The book was written in a way that would appeal to the general public and so it is no surprise that news media, such as The New York Times and the Science News Letter, soon published articles about the project. However, it should be reminded that although Kellogg had assessed the development of language and had expectations for Gua, the project goal was not about teaching human language to an ape and only part of one chapter in The Ape and the Child deals with such.

Despite Kellogg's enthusiasm for the psychological, anthropological, and biological significance of the study, it was not free from criticism. Criticisms came from colleagues, the public, and even Luella. Some stated the project was inhumane while others pointed out the undesirability of using an infant as an experimental subject for an extended period of time. Others disapproved of the separation of Gua from her mother and other chimpanzees. Additionally, since the study had been written in public friendly way and picked up by media, some critics characterized the study as one seeking publicity and excitement.

Kellogg's study later inspired novelist Karen Joy Fowler to write We Are All Completely Beside Ourselves, a fictional account of a similar experiment also set at Indiana University. The book was published in 2013.

== Florida State University ==
In 1950, Kellogg left Indiana University for Florida State University. While it marked the end of his research on conditioning in dogs, it also marked the beginning of an entirely new focus of research. Kellogg would shift his attention to the study of bottle-nosed dolphins, an area of interest that would fill up the next 13 years. At Florida State, Kellogg was given the opportunity to shape the psychology program. He built an exceptional psychology doctoral program by revamping current the undergraduate and master's programs. Additionally he acquired funds from the National Science Foundation (NSF) to build the psychology research building, aided in recruiting faculty, and pushed the growth of the psychology department. His time at Florida State would be dedicated to the study of bottlenose dolphins, driven by his curiosity about how they were able to navigate.

=== Bottlenose dolphins ===
Kellogg worked closely with Robert Kohler at Florida State's marine laboratory between 1952 and 1956. It was with Kohler Kellogg would decide to carry out a project investigating whether dolphins use sonar:

I got involved with Dr. Kellogg of psychology...One day we went out on his sailboat, and we were just sailing along – he had a beautiful little sailboat – just sailing along and here come the porpoises right up by the bow riding the bow wave... He was looking at those things. This guy had more sense under his fingernails than I have in my head, you know. He was really a sharp nail. He looked at the porpoises, and he looked at the water, and we passed a stake or something in the water...And he'd say, "Bob, how do they keep from running into these stakes? Or for that matter, from running into the boats." And, just joking, I said, "Maybe they have sonar." I knew that bats had sonar, and so did he...Kellogg decided by gosh he was going to find out, so he started working on the porpoise problem.

Characteristic of Kellogg, he did so through experiments and careful observations. "The first two papers from the "Porpoise and Sonar" project were published in Science in 1952 and 1953, with Kohler as a co-author."

Two of the main questions with regard to bottle-nose navigation were whether bottlenose dolphins produce sounds serving as sonar signals and whether they decode the echoes bouncing back. To find the answers to these questions, a one-of-a-kind dolphin pool was created off of the Gulf of Mexico coast and two dolphins were obtained. He discovered they do produce "rapidly repeated clicking noises and bird-like whistles". In addition, via the dolphin's ear structure and related neuroanatomy in conjunction with the upper limit of the dolphin's hearing convinced Kellogg that they do decode the echoes.

The Porpoise and Sonar (1961) project was not only important in finding that porpoises made sounds, but that the findings were seen as having "a bearing on national defense, as a means of improving Navy sonar for echo ranging of the porpoise is superior in many respects to the best that man has yet been able to develop …"

Kellogg went beyond purely navigational questions. He tested the discriminative capacity of the dolphins using a choice-discrimination task. The dolphin, named Paddy, quickly learned to go directly to the spot where the larger fish was located. Kellogg concluded that Paddy was discriminating size via echolocation. With typical Kellogg scientific rigor, he conducted additional experiments to support this conclusion and to rule out "possible involvement of other sense modalities". To rule out vision, Paddy was presented with fish at each location but one was behind clear glass. If the dolphin was using vision, it would have swum toward the obstructed fish. In 202 test trials, Paddy committed zero errors and got faster from trial to trial, suggesting the use of echolocation.

In testing problem-solving ability transfer tests of previously learned discriminations were used. Paddy performed flawlessly on 71% of the transfer problems, providing evidence that dolphins are capable of generalizing previously learned visual problems to solve new problems. While continuing to test Paddy, Kellogg and his colleague Rice found a difference in her responding when presenting a stimulus in the air versus in the water. Of 25 pairs of stimuli presented under water, Paddy was correct 84% of the time. Of the pairs presented above the water, Paddy was never correct except when she had discriminated the pair under water previously. Wondering what might be wrong, Kellogg decided to see the set-up from Paddy's point of view. July 14, 1962, Kellogg wrote:

For the first time we made some dives to see what the apparatus looked like from Paddy's standpoint. This probably should have been done on the first day. What we found out was astonishing and I am reluctant to admit we could have gone so far and been so damned dumb. When there is the slightest ripple in the water, the angle of entry of the refracted light rays is so garbled as to prevent any clear image of objects in the air ... In contrast to all this, the stimulus objects when held a few inches under the water are perfectly clear even without an illuminated background. ... Obviously, what we must do is present the stimuli underwater without lights.

Since then, he often tried to understand things from the stand-point of the dolphin, which meant getting wet with the animal. One of Kellogg's doctoral students Ronald Schusterman remembered him "fussing and fuming and berating himself for not doing this when he and Chuck started the experiment with Paddy".

"Kellogg readily admitted his scientific mistakes and corrected them by often acquiring, in a firsthand-way, an understanding of why an animal behaved as it did. This lesson of trying to perceive the world from the animal's viewpoint was never lost on me" .

Though Kellogg intended his work with bottlenose dolphins as a comparison to similar studies undertaken with chimpanzees, the methods did not adequately align thus prohibiting any scientific comparisons between the species. The important thing though, was that his dolphin research was stimulated by his comparative interests.

=== Blind humans ===
Obtaining success with the bottle-nosed dolphin echolocation research, Kellogg wondered whether humans also use echolocation to distinguish objects in their surrounding environment. He outlined this idea and possible research projects in the introduction of the 1962 article "Sonar System of the Blind" which appeared in Science.

== Late life ==
In 1963, Kellogg officially retired from Florida State, although he would return to that campus on several occasions in temporary faculty positions. In 1962, however, he began his association with the Stanford Research Institute (SRI) at Menlo Park, California, where he established two large research projects. One was funded by NSF and involved investigations of sonar in sea lions, while the second was funded by the National Institutes of Health and involved echolocation in blind humans. The grants were for long-term projects, but it is unlikely that Kellogg ever saw his involvement in the projects beyond the first year or two. He hired two of his doctoral students from Florida State to direct the investigations – Ronald Schusterman for the sea lion studies and Charles Rice for the human echolocation studies. In February 1965, Kellogg resigned from SRI. He and Luella spent much of their remaining days together traveling to various parts of the world. Both died in the summer of 1972. Their son, Donald, died by suicide in January 1973.

== Personality ==
Kellogg's personality is uniformly described by those who knew him. He had little tolerance for those he saw as unjust and unethical (despite running an experiment on his own son) and knew who "were the incompetents and scoundrels in science". He had great self-confidence. He was curt and professional, having little time for casual chatter. He was a workaholic and demanding. He had a good sense of humor. He had great energy and intensity, and "brought enthusiasm to much of what he did". While curt, he was approachable and sympathetic to student's problems "was one of the best, if not the best, classroom teachers they had experienced". He exhibited scientific rigor and precaution by controlling extraneous variables and leaving nothing to chance. Robert S. Daniel described Kellogg as part of "the old school of researchers who did everything they could think of to try to prove that their own hypotheses were wrong before they published results" (Daniel, Note 2)

One student noted:

My feelings toward Kellogg were almost always positive. He had a really sweet side, and we struck up a father-son mentoring relationship, which was quite comforting and reassuring. Kellogg was a terrific lecturer with an extensive knowledge about a whole array of topics... His material was always extremely well-organized and comprehensive, almost always containing new and stimulating material. The more I got to know Kellogg, the more I tried to emulate his behavior, hoping to acquire the same self-confidence and flair that he exhibited, particularly when dealing with things of a scientific nature.

Another said: "For Kellogg, science was the product of natural curiosity. He spurned the value of theory because he felt it placed blinders on the scientist causing important findings to go unnoticed or at least to be misinterpreted." "He was a comparative psychologist and a student of animal behavior", as is clear from his research with Gua and Donald and his study of dolphin echolocation. In the realm of conditioning and learning he is noted for his work on spinal conditioning in dogs.

On January 22, 1982, Florida State University named its psychology research building the Kellogg Research Laboratory of Psychology.

== Works ==
- Kellogg, W.N. I931a. A note on fear behavior in young rats, mice, and birds. Journal of Comparative Psychology, 12, pages 117–121.
- Kellogg, W.N. 1931b. Humanizing the ape. Psychological Review, 38, pages 160–176.
- Kellogg, W.N. 1931c. More about the 'wolf children' of India. American Journal of Psychology, 43, pages 508–509.
- Kellogg, W.N. 1932a. The influence of reading matter upon the effectiveness of adjacent advertisements. Journal of Applied Psychology, 16, pages 49–58.
- Kellogg, W.N. 1932b. The effect of emotional excitement upon muscular steadiness. Journal of Experimental Psychology, 15, pages 142–166.
- Kellogg, W.N., & Kellogg, L.A. (1932c). Comparative Tests on a Human and a Chimpanzee Infant of Approximately the Same Age, Part 2 (16-mm silent film). University Park: Pennsylvania State University, Psychol. Cinema Register. https://archive.org/details/comparative_tests_on_human_chimp_infants.
- Kellogg, W.N.1934. A further note on the 'wolf children' of India. American Journal of Psychology, 46, pages 149–150.
- Kellogg, W.N. 1938a. The Indiana conditioning laboratory. American Journal of Psychology, 51, pages 174–176.
- Kellogg, W.N. 1938b. An eclectic view of some theories of learning. Psychological Review, 45, pages 165–184.
- Kellogg, W.N. 1938c. Some objections to Professor Cason's definition of learning. Psychological Review, 45, pages 96–100.
- Kellogg, W.N. 1939. On the nature of skills – a reply to Mr. Lynch. Psychological Review, 46, pages 489–491.
- Kellogg, W.N. 1940. The superfluity of the Chappell critique – a reply. Psychological Review, 47, pages 95–97.
- Kellogg, W.N. 1941. A method for recording the activity of the human fetus in utero, with specimen results. Journal of Genetic Psychology, 58, pages 307–326.
- Kellogg, W.N. 1946. The learning curve for flying an airplane. Journal of Applied Psychology, 30, pages 435–441.
- Kellogg, W.N. 1952. "Anxiety" and conditioning in salt–water fishes. American Psychologist, 7, pages 279–280.
- Kellogg, W.N. 1961. Porpoises and sonar. Chicago: University of Chicago Press.
- Kellogg, W.N. 1968a. Chimpanzees in experimental homes. The Psychological Record, 18, pages 489–498.
- Kellogg, W.N. 1968b. Communication and language in the home–raised chimpanzee. Science, 162, pages 423–427.
- Kellogg, W.N., & Britt, S.H. 1939. Structure or function in the definition of learning? Psychological Review, 46, pages 186–198.
- Kellogg, W.N., Deese, J., Pronko, N.H., & Feinberg, M. 1947. An attempt to condition the chronic spinal dog. Journal of Experimental Psychology, 37, pages 99–117.
- Kellogg, W.N., & Eagleson, B.M. 1931. The growth of social perception in different racial groups. Journal of Educational Psychology, 22, pages 367–375.
- Kellogg, W.N., & Kellogg, L.A. 1933. The ape and the child. New York: Whittlesey House (McGraw-Hill).
- Kellogg, W.N., & Payne, B. 1938. The true-false question as an aid in studying. Journal of Educational Psychology, 29, pages 581–589.
- Kellogg, W.N., & Pomeroy, W.B. 1936. Maze learning in water snakes. Journal of Comparative Psychology, 21, pages 275–295.
- Kellogg, W.N., & Rice, C.E. 1966. Visual discrimination and problem solving in a bottlenose dolphin. In K.S. Norris (Ed.), Whales, dolphins, and porpoises. Berkeley: University of California Press.
