= Chimpanzee and Human Communication Institute =

Former research institute in Washington, US

The Chimpanzee and Human Communication Institute (CHCI) was located on the campus of Central Washington University in Ellensburg, Washington. CHCI included a sanctuary for chimpanzees who have learned to communicate with humans and each other using American Sign Language. CHCI's director was Mary Lee Jensvold. It was founded by former co-directors Roger Fouts and Deborah Fouts. The institute was closed in 2013 when the remaining chimpanzees were transferred to facilities in Quebec, Canada, and the building the facility was housed in, was demolished in 2018. Portions of the specialized structures used to house the chimps were dismantled and moved to the Chimpanzee Sanctuary Northwest in Cle Elum, for future use.

== Former resident chimpanzees ==
- Washoe, September, 1965 – October 30, 2007. Washoe was the first non-human primate to learn some rudimentary forms of ASL, a true human language.
- Loulis, May 10, 1978 – (moved out in 2013). Loulis is Washoe's adopted son and was the subject of a project that examined whether he would learn sign language from other chimpanzees. The complete research was not published in a peer-reviewed journal, but can be found in the 1989 book Teaching Sign Language to Chimpanzees edited by Allen and Beatrix Gardner.
- Tatu, 1975 – (moved out in 2013)
- Dar, 1976 – 2012
- Moja, 1972 – 2002

Loulis and Tatu, the remaining two chimpanzees in the center after the natural death of Washoe and Dar, moved to the Fauna Foundation in Quebec in late August 2013, where they will be integrated into an existing group of eleven chimpanzees.

== History ==
In September 1980, Washoe, Loulis, and Moja moved to Central Washington University. Tatu and Dar followed the next year. The chimpanzees were originally housed on the third floor of the university's psychology complex. Roger Fouts and Deborah Fouts with their students advocated for, and lobbied the campus and the state legislature for a specialized facility, and the CHCI complex was opened on May 7, 1993. More than twenty years later, on August 28, 2013, the last two remaining chimpanzees moved out of the CHCI.

== Mission ==
CHCI promotes advocacy of chimpanzee conservation and the promotion of primate intellect. The sanctuary hosted public sessions, Chimposiums, which allowed the public to see the chimpanzees in action. For safety reasons, no one—visitors or staff—had physical contact with the chimpanzees.

== Research opportunities ==
CHCI provides research opportunities for both undergraduates and graduates. When it housed the chimpanzees, many volunteered as docents or assistants within the center while others conducted research on primate behavior. Research projects which inconvenienced the chimpanzees in any way were not permitted; therefore, research was mostly observational. Students of Central Washington University continue to use the extensive database of chimpanzee communication collected by the CHCI for research into non-human primate communication and behavior.

== See also ==
- Washoe (chimpanzee)
- Loulis
- Roger Fouts
- Deborah Fouts
- Mary Lee Jensvold
- Fauna Foundation
