= Loulis =

Chimpanzee involved in sign-language experiments

- Species: Chimpanzee
- Sex: Male
- Born: May 10, 1978 (age 48)

Loulis (born May 10, 1978) is a chimpanzee who learned to communicate using signs adapted from American Sign Language.

Loulis was named for two caregivers (Louise and Lisa) at the Yerkes Regional Primate Research Center in Atlanta, Georgia, where he was born. After ten months at Yerkes, Loulis was taken from his biological mother (who remained at Yerkes) and transferred to Oklahoma by Roger Fouts. Fouts had been working with Washoe, the first chimpanzee used in sign language experiments, and wanted to see what would happen if Washoe had an infant. Specifically, Fouts wanted to know if she would teach her offspring signs, so he gave infant Loulis to Washoe. In 1980, Roger and Deborah Fouts moved to Central Washington University in Ellensburg, Washington with several other chimpanzees involved in the language experiments. By 1993, the Chimpanzee and Human Communication Institute (CHCI) was built for the chimpanzees to reside in. In 2013, Loulis was moved from the CHCI to the chimpanzee sanctuary of the Fauna Foundation in Canada.

== Language abilities ==
Washoe and three other chimpanzees (Tatu, Dar, and Moja) were raised as if they were deaf human children and taught signs from American Sign Language. The chimpanzees regularly use the hand signals to communicate with each other and humans. Loulis is the only chimpanzee in the family who was not cross-fostered; he wasn't raised by humans but rather Washoe and the other chimpanzees.

After eight days with Washoe, Loulis learned his first sign. For the first five years of his life, Loulis's human handlers only used seven signs around him (the signs used were who, which, want, where, name, that, and sign). Loulis was able to acquire what he learned of ASL from Washoe.

The details of this research can be found in Teaching Sign Language to Chimpanzees, edited by R. Allen Gardner, Beatrix T. Gardner, and Thomas E. Van Cantfort, State University of New York Press, Albany, 1989.

Mary Lee Jensvold, a chimp researcher who has worked with Loulis and Tatu, another former CHCI chimp, reported that the two chimps from CHCI continued to use signs at Fauna Foundation. Her most recent study about the chimps' sign was published in 2024.

== See also ==
- Great ape language
- List of individual apes
