= Deborah Fouts =

American anthropologist

Deborah Fouts was the co-director of the Chimpanzee and Human Communication Institute (CHCI). CHCI was the home of Washoe, the first non-human to acquire a human language, and three other chimpanzees who use the signs of American Sign Language to communicate with each other and their human caregivers. She is an Adjunct Assistant Professor of Psychology (Research) at Central Washington University in Ellensburg, Washington. She is married to former co-director, now retired Roger Fouts.

== Professional background ==
Roger and Deborah Fouts were co-directors and co-founders of the Chimpanzee and Human Communication Institute.

The Foutses have been a part of Project Washoe since 1967. Project Washoe is the first and longest running project of its kind. Washoe was the very first nonhuman animal to acquire the rudiments of an otherwise fully complex human language, American Sign Language for the Deaf (ASL). The project later focused on the signing of its four sign language using chimpanzees who lived together as a social group: Washoe, Tatu, Dar and Loulis. The chimpanzees used some of the signs of ASL in their interactions with humans and with each other, to comment on their environment, but mostly to make requests, and sometimes answer questions and describe activities and objects. Loulis acquired a total of about five signs from his adoptive mother Washoe and the other chimpanzees, becoming the first chimpanzee to acquire five signs of a human language from chimpanzees thus demonstrating the ability of the chimpanzee to culturally transmit five signs of a language across generations.

Together the Foutses have more than 100 articles published in scientific journals and books. In 1981 they founded Friends of Washoe a non-profit organization dedicated to the welfare of chimpanzees. They have resided in Ellensburg since 1980; and, with hundreds of students, they have conducted their research and enriched the lives of the chimpanzees at Central Washington University. In 1992 they founded at CWU the Chimpanzee and Human Communication Institute (CHCI), a sanctuary for chimpanzees. CHCI is dedicated to the protection of chimpanzees, the education of students and public alike. Recent research at CHCI focused on the private signing of the chimpanzees, imaginary play and signing, chimpanzee to chimpanzee conversations, conversation repair, representational drawing, and the symbolic representation of spatial relations with ASL signs as well as a comparison of gestural dialects in this population of captive chimpanzees and three populations of free-living chimpanzees. Before retirement, the Foutses began a new research direction, studying four different free-living communities of chimpanzees in Africa to record and analyze their behavior for gestural dialects.

The Foutses were very active in their efforts to improve the living conditions and treatment of chimpanzees in captivity by developing and promoting humane care techniques and programs. In addition, they were active in efforts to protect the free-living chimpanzees in Africa. The Foutses played a role in the U. S. Fish and Wildlife, raising chimpanzees in Africa from "Threatened" to "Endangered" species status (see Endangered Species Act). The Foutses were very active in the Sanctuary movement to provide for chimpanzees used in and retired from the Air Force Space program and other biomedical research (see Animal Testing). They were active as well in promoting basic rights for Great Apes, as founding members of, and signatory contributors to, the Great Ape Project.

In 1997, Roger Fouts wrote Next of Kin a memoir of their lives with Washoe. It was selected by The Los Angeles Times as one of top 100 books of 1997.

== Awards ==
The 1989 Recognition and Appreciation Award presented by the Progressive Animal Welfare Society, Seattle, Washington, March 1989.

The 1992 Award of Recognition presented by the Performing Animals Welfare Society, Sacramento, California, May 1992.

Associated Students of Central Washington University “Prominent Figure Award”, for outstanding service to Central Washington Univ., 1991–92.

The 1996 Humane Achievement Award, presented by the Performing Animals Welfare Society, Los Angeles, California, November 1996.

National Association of Biology Teachers Distinguished Service Award 2000, Orlando, Florida.

The Chimfunshi Chimpanzee Sanctuary “PAL” Award for Chimpanzee Conservation and Awareness, 2000, Johannesburg, South Africa

== Selected publications since 1998 ==
Fouts, R. S. & Fouts, D. H. (1998). Chimpanzees. In M. Bekoff & C. Meaney (Eds.) Encyclopedia of animal rights and animal welfare. Westport, CT: Greenwood Publishing Group, Inc., 105–107.

Fouts, R. S. & Fouts, D. H. (1999). My brother's keeper. In M. Rowe (Ed.) The way of compassion. New York: Stealth Technologies, 192–194

Fouts, R. S. & Fouts, D. H. (1999). Chimpanzee sign language research. In P. Dolhinow & A. Fuentes (Eds.) The nonhuman primates. Mountain View, CA: Mayfield Publishing Co., 252–256.

Fouts, D. H. & Fouts, R. S. (2000) Our emotional kin. In M. Bekoff (Ed.) The smile of a dolphin. New York: Discovery Books/ Random House, pp. 204–207.

Jensvold, M. L., Sanz, C., Fouts, R. S., & Fouts, D. H. (2001) Effect of enclosure size and complexity of the behaviors of captive chimpanzees (Pan troglodytes). Journal of Applied Animal Welfare, 4(1), 53–69.

Fouts, R. S., Fouts, D. H. and Waters, G. (2002). The ethics and efficacy of chimpanzees in HIV research. In A. Fuentes and L. Wolfe (Eds.). Conservation Implications of Human and Nonhuman Primate Interconnections. Cambridge University Press, pp. 45–60.

Fouts, R.S., Jensvold, M.L.A. & Fouts, D.H. (2002). Chimpanzee signing: Darwinian realities and Cartesian delusions. In M. Bekoff, C. Allen & G. Burghardt (Eds.) The cognitive animal: Empirical and theoretical perspectives in animal cognition. Cambridge, MA: MIT Press, pp. 654–672.

Fouts, R. & Fouts, D. (2005). Captive chimpanzees. In Andrew Linzey (Ed.) The international animal world. Oxford: Oxford University Press.

Fouts, R.S., Fouts, D.H. & Waters, G. (2003) Wrist-walking: A candidate for a culturally transmitted communicative gesture). International Primatological Society Bulletin, 29(2), 9.

Fouts, R. & Fouts, D. (2003) Chimpanzees. In The great ape project census: Recognition for the uncounted. Portland, OR: GAP Books, pp. 31–34

Jensvold, M. L., Fouts, R. S., & Fouts, D. H. (2004). Assessment of species typical behaviours in captive chimpanzees. Animal Welfare, 13, S243.

Fouts, R. Jensvold, M.L., & Fouts, D. (2004) Talking chimpanzees. In M. Bekoff (Ed.) Encyclopedia of animal behavior. Greenwood Publishing Group.

Fouts, R., Jensvold, M.L., & Fouts, D. ( In press). Taking chimpanzees on their own terms: Thirty-five years of non-invasive research. In D. Herzing (Ed). Crossing interspecies boundaries. Temple University Press.

Fouts, R. S. & Fouts, D. H. (2004). Primate language. In R. Gregory (Ed.), The Oxford companion to the mind. Oxford, England: Oxford University Press.

== See also ==
- Chimpanzee and Human Communication Institute
- Washoe (chimpanzee)
- Loulis
- Mary Lee Jensvold
- Roger Fouts
