= Roger Fouts =

American primate researcher

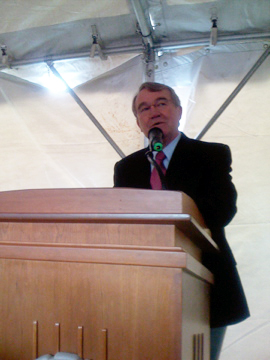
Roger S. Fouts delivering Washoe's Eulogy

Roger S. Fouts (born June 8, 1943) is a retired American primate researcher. He was co-founder and co-director of the Chimpanzee and Human Communication Institute (CHCI) in Washington, and a professor of psychology at the Central Washington University. He is best known for his role in teaching Washoe the chimpanzee to communicate using a set of signs adapted from American sign language.

Fouts is an animal rights advocate, citing the New Zealand Animal Welfare Act as a model for legal rights for the Great Apes (Hominidae), and campaigning with British primatologist Jane Goodall for improved conditions for chimpanzees. He has written on animal law and on the ethics of animal testing. He is also an adviser to the Oxford Centre for Animal Ethics.

He is married to Deborah Fouts, who was the co-director and co-founder of CHCI.

== Early life ==
Fouts was born in Sacramento, California and grew up on a family farm, surrounded by animals. He received his B.A. in child psychology from the college that became California State University, Long Beach a few years later. In 1964, he married Deborah Harris, who became his life-time collaborator. Fouts earned his Ph.D. from the University of Nevada, Reno.

== Career ==
In 1967, Fouts' future took a decisive turn when he interviewed for a half-time assistantship position at the University of Nevada. Fouts had intended on a career working with nonverbal children and needed this job—teaching sign language to a chimp—to pay for graduate school. The plan was almost derailed by a disastrous job interview with Dr. Allen Gardner, who felt Fouts' career goals were not aligned with the project's scientific bent. However, Washoe, the chimpanzee subject, took an immediate liking to Fouts and leapt into his arms. A few days later Fouts was told he had got the job.

=== In Norman, Oklahoma ===
The Gardners initially used operant conditioning to teach Washoe signs from American Sign Language (ASL). Fouts, as their employee, was to reward Washoe with praise and treats and use a step-by-step process to get Washoe to sign correctly. But Fouts found more success by catering to Washoe's desire to imitate and socially connect. When introducing a new sign, he would gently guide the chimp toward making the proper gesture (manipulating her hands into the required shapes) while emphasizing social connection over "training."

Fouts' method proved to be more effective in Washoe's acquisition of new signs, and the Gardners adopted it in future chimp studies. Conditioning practices, they found, inhibited a primate's natural curiosity and desire to learn.

In Oklahoma, Fouts' primary research project was exploring whether Washoe would teach signs to an infant. Unfortunately, as a captive-raised chimpanzee, Washoe did not know how to properly mother an infant and both of the babies she gave birth to died. Fouts arranged for Washoe to "adopt" an older infant from another primate lab, named Loulis. Loulis, Washoe's adopted son, was ultimately said to have learned over 70 signs directly from Washoe. During this period, Fouts also worked with nonverbal Autistic children and found that teaching sign language helped the children interact with others and in some cases even prompted speaking.

An animal lover since childhood, Fouts struggled with his conflicting responsibilities as a research scientist and chimpanzee guardian. He was in frequent conflict with William Lemmon, the head of the Institute for Primate Studies, and the owner of most of the chimps.

The chimpanzees who survived into adulthood were housed in small cages and, in most cases, ultimately since to medical labs. Fouts, unable to control their circumstances, began drinking heavily and became, in his words, “an absent father and a lousy husband.”

=== At Central Washington University ===
In 1980, Fouts accepted a tenured position as Professor of Psychology at Central Washington University (CWU) and arranged to take three of the chimpanzees with him to Ellensburg: Washoe, Loulis and Moja. In 1981, the Gardners sent Fouts two more chimps that they had finished working with, 4-year-old Dar and 5-year-old Tatu, bringing the total to five. As the ape communication studies progressed, they found that the animals used signs to communicate with each other. The apes created phrases from combinations of signs to denote new things that were brought into their environment.

In 1986, an animal rights group called True Friends broke into a National Institute of Health (NIH) lab in Rockville, Maryland. The group videotaped AIDS-infected primates held in unfavorable conditions and mailed tapes to Jane Goodall, Roger Fouts and major media outlets. In response to the negative press, Congress organized a panel of experts, including Roger Fouts, to address USDA standards for NIH-funded labs. Fouts urged to panel to require larger cages for chimpanzees (currently held 5' x 5' isolation cubes); he was opposed by every other participant, including primatologist Frans de Waal. In 1991, Fouts partnered with the Animal Legal Defense Fund and sued the USDA for its treatment of captive chimpanzees, arguing that it violated the Animal Welfare Act. The U.S. District Court ruled in their favor, but the decision was overruled on appeal.

Roger and Deborah Fouts founded the nonprofit Friends of Washoe to fundraise for their chimps' care. They also founded the Chimpanzee and Human Communication Institute (CHCI). In the 1990s, they pivoted to studying chimpanzees' natural gestural dialects.

Roger Fouts has served as a consultant for the Animal Legal Defense Fund, the Natural Resources Defense Council, and the film Greystoke: The Legend of Tarzan.

=== Retirement ===
In June tired 2011, the Fouts' retired and promoted Mary Lee Jensvold to director of CHCI. Two years later, Tatu and Loulis, the two surviving chimps, were sent to Fauna Foundation and CHCI was closed. A 2023 study found that over an eight-year period at the Fauna sanctuary, used signs to communicate with staff and each other.

== See also ==
- Great ape language
- International primate trade
- List of animal rights advocates
- Nonhuman primate experiments
- Washoe (chimpanzee)
