= Washoe (chimpanzee) =

Chimpanzee language research subject

- Species: Chimpanzee
- Born: 1965; West Africa
- Died: October 30, 2007 (aged 42); Ellensburg, Washington, United States
- Cause of death: Complications from SAIDS
- Known for: Use of sign language

Washoe (1965 – October 30, 2007) was a female common chimpanzee who was the first non-human to learn to communicate using signs adapted from American Sign Language (ASL) as part of an animal research experiment on animal language acquisition.

Washoe learned approximately 350 signs of ASL, also teaching her adopted son Loulis some signs. She spent most of her life at Central Washington University.

== Early life ==
Washoe was born in West Africa in 1965. She was captured for use by the US Air Force for research for the US space program. Washoe was named after Washoe County, Nevada, where she was raised and taught to use ASL.

In 1967, R. Allen Gardner and Beatrix Gardner established a project to teach Washoe ASL at the University of Nevada, Reno. At the time, previous attempts to teach chimpanzees to imitate vocal languages (the Gua and Viki projects) had failed. The Gardners believed that these projects were flawed because chimpanzees are physically unable to produce the voiced sounds required for oral language. Their solution was to utilize the chimpanzee's ability to communicate through gesture, which is how they communicate in the wild, by starting a project based on American Sign Language. The Gardners raised Washoe as one would raise a child. She frequently wore clothes and sat with them at the dinner table. Washoe had her own 8-foot-by-24-foot trailer complete with living and cooking areas. The trailer had a couch, drawers, a refrigerator, and a bed with sheets and blankets. She had access to clothing, combs, toys, books, and a toothbrush. Much like a human child, she underwent a regular routine with chores, outdoor play, and rides in the family car. Upon seeing a swan, Washoe signed "water" and "bird". Harvard psychologist Roger Brown said that "was like getting an S.O.S. from outer space".

When Washoe was five, the Gardners moved on to other chimp projects, and returned her to the University of Oklahoma's Institute of Primate Studies in Norman, Oklahoma, under the care of Roger Fouts and Deborah Fouts.

== ASL instruction and usage ==
=== Teaching method ===
Washoe was raised in an environment as close as possible to that of a human child, in an attempt to satisfy her psychological need for companionship.

While with Washoe, the Gardners and Foutses communicated exclusively in ASL, avoiding vocal communication, on the assumption that this would create a less confusing learning environment for Washoe. This technique was said to resemble that used when teaching human children language.

After the first couple of years of the language project, the Gardners and Roger Fouts discovered that Washoe could pick up ASL gestures without direct instruction; she learned by observing humans around her who were signing amongst themselves. For example, the scientists signed "toothbrush" to each other while they brushed their teeth near her. At the time of observation, Washoe showed no signs of having learned the sign, but later reacted to the sight of a toothbrush by spontaneously producing the correct sign. Moreover, the Gardners began to realize that rewarding particular signs with food and tickles—the approach used in operant conditioning—interfered with the learning process. Instead, they set up a conversational environment that evoked communication, without the use of rewards for specific actions.

=== Confirmed signs ===
Washoe learned approximately 350 signs. For researchers to consider that Washoe had learned a sign, she had to use it spontaneously and appropriately for 14 consecutive days.

These signs were then further tested using a double-blind vocabulary test. This test demonstrated 1) "that the chimpanzee subjects could communicate information under conditions in which the only source of information available to a human observer was the signing of the chimpanzee;" 2) "that independent observers agreed with each other;" and 3) "that the chimpanzees used the signs to refer to natural language categories—that the sign DOG could refer to any dog, FLOWER to any flower, SHOE to any shoe."

=== Combinations of signs ===
Washoe and her mates were allegedly able to combine the hundreds of signs that they learned into novel combinations (that they had never been taught, but rather created themselves) with different meanings. For instance, when Washoe's mate Moja did not know the word for "thermos", Moja referred to it as a "METAL CUP DRINK." However, Washoe's combinations were open to interpretation. Herbert S. Terrace contended that seeming sign combinations did not stand for a single item but rather represented three individual signs. Taking the thermos example, rather than METAL CUP DRINK being a composite meaning thermos, it could be that Washoe was indicating there was an item of metal (METAL), one shaped like a cup (CUP), and that could be drunk out of (DRINK).

== Self-awareness and emotion ==
One of Washoe's caretakers was pregnant and missed work for many weeks after she miscarried. Roger Fouts recounts the following situation:

People who should be there for her and aren't are often given the cold shoulder—her way of informing them that she's miffed at them. Washoe greeted Kat [the caretaker] in just this way when she finally returned to work with the chimps. Kat made her apologies to Washoe, then decided to tell her the truth, signing "MY BABY DIED". Washoe stared at her, then looked down. She finally peered into Kat's eyes again and carefully signed "CRY", touching her cheek and drawing her finger down the path a tear would make on a human (Chimpanzees don't shed tears). Kat later remarked that one sign told her more about Washoe and her mental capabilities than all her longer, grammatically perfect sentences.

Washoe herself lost two children. One baby chimpanzee died of a heart defect shortly after birth; the other baby, Sequoyah, died of a staph infection at two months of age.

When Washoe was shown an image of herself in the mirror, and asked what she was seeing, she replied: "Me, Washoe." Primate expert Jane Goodall, who had studied and lived with chimpanzees for decades, believed that this might indicate some level of self-awareness. Washoe appeared to experience an identity crisis when she was first introduced to other chimpanzees, seeming shocked to learn that she was not the only chimpanzee. She gradually came to enjoy associating with other chimpanzees.

Washoe enjoyed playing pretend with her dolls, which she would bathe and talk to and would act out imaginary scenarios. She also spent time brushing her teeth, painting and taking tea parties.

When new students came to work with Washoe, she would slow down her rate of signing for novice speakers of sign language, which had a humbling effect on many of them.

== Quotes ==
(In this section double quotes are signed by Washoe, single by someone else.)

- "Peekaboo (i.e. hide and seek) I go"
- "Baby (doll) in my drink (i.e. cup)" (when doll placed in her cup)
- "Time Eat?" and "you me time eat?"
- Asked 'Who's coming?' Responded "Mrs G" (correct).
- "You, Me out go". 'OK but first clothes' (Washoe puts on jacket.)
- "Good, go", 'Where Go', "You Me Peekaboo"
- 'What That' "Shoe" 'Whose That Shoe' "Yours" 'What color' "Black".

== Later life and death ==
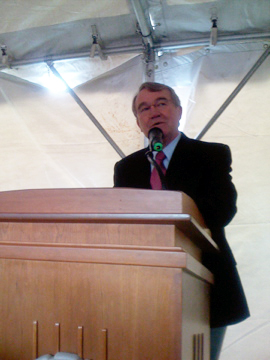
Roger Fouts delivering Washoe's eulogy

Washoe was moved to Central Washington University in 1980. On October 30, 2007, officials from the Chimpanzee and Human Communication Institute on the CWU campus announced that she had died at the age of 42.

== Impact on bioethics ==
Some believe that the fact that Washoe not only communicated, but also formed close and personal relationships with humans indicates that she was emotionally sensitive and deserving of moral status.

Work with Washoe and other signing primates motivated the foundation of the Great Ape Project, which hopes to "include the non-human great apes: chimpanzees, orangutans and gorillas within the community of equals by granting them the basic moral and legal protections that only humans currently enjoy", in order to place them in the moral category of "persons" rather than private property

== Friends of Washoe ==
Friends of Washoe is a 501.c3 non-profit organization founded in 1981 dedicated to caring for Washoe’s surviving family. Their stated mission revolves around education and promoting peace between humans and non-human animals. They provide information and updates on Washoe’s family on their website

== Related animal language projects ==
The publication of the Washoe experiments spurred a revival in the scholarly study of sign language, due to widespread interest in questions it raised about the biological roots of language. This included additional experiments which attempted to teach great apes to communicate in a more controlled environment.

In 1979, after Herbert Terrace and Thomas Bever's Nim Chimpsky project failed to demonstrate a chimps' ability to use sentences, Terrace criticized Project Washoe as well. Drawing on public film clips of Washoe, Terrace questioned Washoe's purported ability to create novel expressions and statements. He and Thomas Sebeok argued that the apparently impressive results may have amounted to nothing more than a "Clever Hans" effect.

Washoe's advocates responded by pointing out a number of methodological problems with Terrace's Nim study, issues later documented in Elizabeth Hess's Nim Chimpsky: The Chimp Who Would Be Human and the documentary Project Nim.

== See also ==
- Alex (talking parrot)
- Animal cognition
- Great ape language
- Kanzi
- Koko (gorilla)
- List of individual apes
- Nim Chimpsky
- Batyr (elephant)
- Hoover (seal)
