= Gua (chimpanzee) =

Ape experimentally raised as a human child

- Species: Chimpanzee (Pan troglodytes)
- Sex: Female
- Born: November 15, 1930; Havana, Cuba
- Died: December 21, 1933 (aged 3)
- Cause of death: Pneumonia
- Known for: Cross-fostering study

Gua (November 15, 1930 - December 21, 1933) was a chimpanzee raised as though she were a human child by scientists Luella and Winthrop Kellogg alongside their infant son Donald. Gua was the first chimpanzee to be used in a cross-rearing study in the US.

Gua was born on November 15, 1930, in Havana, Cuba. She was given, along with her mother, Pati, and her father, Jack, to the old Orange Park, Florida, site of the Yerkes Regional Primate Research Center, by Pierre Abreu on May 13, 1931, after the death of his mother, Madame Rosalia Abreu.

Gua was brought into the Kellogg home at the age of 7 1/2 months, and reared with their son Donald, who was 10 months old at the time. For nine months the Kelloggs raised the two as "brother and sister", and comprehensively recorded the development of the chimpanzee and the human child. When she was around one year old, Gua often tested ahead of Donald in such tasks as responding to simple commands or using a cup and spoon. Slight differences in their placement included people recognition. Gua recognized people from their clothes and their smell while Donald recognized them by their faces.

The parting difference came with language. Donald was about 16 months and Gua was a little over a year old when they had language testing. Gua could not speak, but Donald could form words. On March 28, 1932, nine months into the experiment, the Kelloggs officially ended it as Donald began to copy Gua's sounds. Gua was returned to the primate center with Robert Yerkes in Florida, where she was the subject of further studies by Yerkes' wife Ada. The Kelloggs returned to Indiana.

Gua died of pneumonia on December 21, 1933, less than a year after she left the Kelloggs' family and just after turning three years old.

== See also ==
- Great Ape Language
- List of individual apes

== Further resources ==
- Kellogg, W. N.; Kellogg, Luella Agger (1933). he Ape and The Child: A Comparative Study of the Environmental Influence Upon Early Behavior. New York, London: Whittlesey House, McGraw-Hill Book Co. OCLC 563056911 – via HathiTrust.
- Films Media Group (2000), Who's Aping Who? Bringing Up Baby, National Geographic Digital Media, OCLC 856058512
