= Laboratory for Experimental Medicine and Surgery in Primates =

New York University research facility

Coordinates: 41°11′58″N 74°15′9″W

- Other name: LEMSIP
- Founders: Edward Goldsmith and Jan Moor-Jankowski
- Established: 1965
- Owner: New York University
- Location: Tuxedo, New York, US
- Interactive map of Laboratory for Experimental Medicine and Surgery in Primates
- Dissolved: 1998

The Laboratory for Experimental Medicine and Surgery in Primates (LEMSIP) was a New York University research facility founded in 1965 by Edward Goldsmith and Jan Moor-Jankowski. The Tuxedo, New York-based outfit was a prominent vendor of primates and primate parts in the New York metropolitan area. These were used by area scientists for transplantation and virus research. The institute closed in 1998.

The facility was the subject of a documentary produced by National Geographic featuring Jane Goodall. The award-winning episode, Chimp Rescue, was broadcast in 1998, shortly after the closure of the facility. The documentary chronicled James Mahoney's efforts to save approximately one hundred primates prior to the closure of the facility.

One of the likely contributing factors to the demise of LEMSIP was the revision of the caging requirements prescribed by the USDA. The upgrades would have cost the university at least US$2 million. As a result, custody of several animals were passed on to the Coulston Foundation.

Moor-Jankowski, a member of the French Academy of Medicine, accused NYU in 1996 of his ousting as director of LEMSIP. He alleged that this act was retaliation for whistle-blowing on former NYU primate addiction researcher Ron Wood.
