= Beatrix Tugendhut Gardner =

Austrian-American psychologist (1933–1995)

- Born: July 13, 1933; Vienna, Austria
- Died: June 5, 1995 (aged 61); Italy
- Known for: Teaching ASL to Washoe the chimpanzee
- Spouse: Allen Gardner

Academic background
- Education: Radcliffe College; Brown University; Oxford University (PhD)

Academic work
- Discipline: Zoologist
- Sub-discipline: Ethology; Psychobiology
- Institutions: Wellesley College; University of Nevada, Reno

Beatrix Tugendhut Gardner (July 13, 1933 – June 5, 1995) was an Austrian-American zoologist who became well known for the primate research that she conducted in the United States. She taught sign language to Washoe the chimpanzee, who was the first ape to learn American sign language.

== Early life and education ==
Gardner was born on July 13, 1933, in Vienna, Austria. She lived in Poland during Nazi rule, and moved with her family to a suburb in São Paulo, Brazil, to escape the Nazis in 1939. She and her family remained in Brazil for six years, at which point Beatrix moved to the United States to attend school.

Beatrix, often spelled "Beatrice", attended Radcliffe College in Massachusetts and received her bachelor's degree in 1954. In 1956, she earned her master's degree from Brown University, working with Carl Pfaffman. She completed her PhD in zoology at Oxford University in 1959 where she studied under the mentorship of Niko Tinbergen. Her focus was studying food deprivation and feeding response in stickleback fish.

== Career ==
She used her ethological training background and applied it to psychobiology at Wellesley College, where she was hired to teach after Oxford. At Wellesley, she began studying children in comparison to adults, specifically with regard to their head shape. She found that a continuous transformation in head profile shape was an effective factor in determining how a person judged the "babyishness" of a head.

At Wellesley, Beatrice met Allen Gardner. They met when they both attended a talk being given by Harry Harlow on his studies of contact comfort in infant rhesus macaque monkeys. In 1961, they married, and in 1963 they both took positions at the University of Nevada, Reno. There, Beatrice continued to use her ethological training and studied the effects of food deprivation in jumping spiders and predatory jumping spider behavior.

In 1966, the Gardner and her husband acquired a 10-month-old chimpanzee that they named Washoe, who was named after the county in Nevada that they lived in. Gardner would become most well remembered for the work that she did with Washoe. Washoe was originally obtained by the US Air Force to use as a part of their space program, but she instead was sent to Gardner to participate in her study, which would try to teach Washoe American Sign Language (ASL).

=== Language learning with apes ===
Prior to Gardner's work with Washoe, there had been no successful teaching of language to any apes. There had been a couple of failed attempts at teaching vocal language to chimpanzees. Keith and Catherine Hayes attempted to teach an infant chimpanzee named Viki how to speak. At the end of their study, Viki was only able to form four words, and mostly they came out as sounds that she was able to mimic on command. This method of teaching language to apes lacked ethological validity, which Gardner was able to bring to the table, thanks to her background training from working with Niko Tinbergen. Together with her husband and a team of researchers that worked around the clock to raise Washoe using only ASL, Dr. Gardner was successful in teaching Washoe to use 250 different ASL signs, and she was able to use them in novel configurations.

Due to the success of the project, Gardner continued to expand it by obtaining four infant chimpanzees named Moja, Pili, Tatu, and Dar. Gardner wanted to begin the sign language training from younger than 10 months old, which was Washoe's age when she was first acquired. She also wanted to raise these infant apes alongside each other to determine whether cultural transmission of signing would occur, or whether the apes would use sign language to communicate with one another. At this point, Washoe moved to the Institute of Primate Studies in Norman, Oklahoma, under the care of Roger and Deborah Fouts, who were two of the original researchers that had helped to raise Washoe. In 1980, Washoe moved with the Fouts to Ellensburg, Washington, where she lived out her life until she died in 2007 at the age of 42.

=== Controversy ===
There were several skeptics of the language training that Gardner was working on with Washoe. Not everyone believed that Washoe was truly using "language". Rather, they believed that Washoe was communicating using symbols that she associated with specific rewards, and they claimed that is why she would not use them conversationally. Herbert Terrace, a cognitive scientist at Columbia University, attempted to replicate the success of Washoe's training with another chimpanzee named Nim Chimpsky. Nim was able to learn ASL, but was raised in a true "laboratory" environment. This meant that instead of being raised in a nurturing and affectionate environment that many would argue is essential for human child development (and how Washoe was raised), Nim was raised in a controlled environment that lacked this component. Terrace claimed that Nim never spontaneously produced signs, nor did he use any grammar rules while signing. He was only able to communicate for food rewards.

== Honors and awards ==
Gardner became the president of the Rocky Mountain Psychological Association in 1994. She received the University of Reno National Institute of Mental Health Research Scientist Development Award. She was also a Sigma Xi National Lecturer.

== Personal life ==
Gardner had no children. She died while traveling in Italy with her husband at the age of 61 due to sepsis, and she left no immediate survivors other than her husband, Allen Gardner (1930–2021).

== Publications ==
- Tugendhat, B. (1960). The normal feeding behavior of the three-spinded stickleback. Behaviour, 15, 284–318.(a)
- Tugendhat, B. (1960). The distributed feeding behavior of the three-spinded stickleback: I. Electric shock is administered in the food area. Behaviour, 16, 159–187.(b)
- Gardner, B. T., & Wallach, L. (1966). Shapes of figures identified as a baby's head. Perceptual and Motor Skills, 20, 135–142.
- Gardner, B. T. (1966). Hunger and characteristics of the prey in the hunting behavior of salticid. Journal of Comparative and Physiological Psychology, 62, 475–478.
- Gardner RA, Van Cantfort TE, Gardner BT. 1992. Categorical replies to categorical questions by cross-fostered chimpanzees. The American Journal of Psychology. 105: 27–57.
- Drumm P, Gardner BT, Gardner RA. 1968. Vocal and gestural responses of cross-fostered chimpanzees. The American Journal of Psychology. 99: 1–29.
- Gardner BT, Gardner RA. 1985. Signs of intelligence in cross-fostered chimpanzees. Philosophical Transactions of the Royal Society of London. Series B, Biological Sciences. 308: 159–76.
- Gardner RA, Gardner BT. 1984. A vocabulary test for chimpanzees (Pan troglodytes). Journal of Comparative Psychology (Washington, D.C.: 1983). 98: 381–404.
- Gardner RA, Gardner BT. 1978. Comparative psychology and language acquisition. Annals of the New York Academy of Sciences. 309: 37–76.
- Gardner RA, Gardner BT. 1975. Early signs of language in child and chimpanzee. Science. 187: 752–3.
- Gardner RA, Gardner BT. 1969. Teaching sign language to a chimpanzee. Science. 165: 664–72.
