= Viki (chimpanzee) =

Chimpanzee ape language research subject

Viki was the subject of one of the first experiments in ape language, dating back to the late 1940s and early 1950s. Viki the chimpanzee was raised by Keith and Catherine Hayes in the same manner as a human infant, to see if she could learn human words. She was given speech therapy, which involved the Hayeses (her adopters) manipulating her lower jaw. Eventually, she was able to voice four words:

- mama
- papa
- up
- cup

Analysis on recordings of her vocalizations concluded she was "incapable of simultaneous recruitment of consonantal “frames” and vowel-like 'content' but she "successfully produced a small sample of humanlike consonantal speech sounds, including labial and, possibly, velar articulations".

At the time, her extremely limited success was initially interpreted as showing that apes were incapable of using human language. However, further experiments in which chimpanzees were instructed in the use of American sign language indicated that Viki's achievements had been significantly hampered by physiological limitations: chimpanzees are not able to produce the sounds that make up human speech. Viki lived like a human, even with a human sibling, for three years with her trainers, Keith and Cathy Hayes in Orange Park, Florida, with the notion that the other failed attempts of teaching a non-human primate a human language failed because these studies used environments too dissimilar to a human's environment when infants learn language. Immersive language experienced failed, however, after three years Cathy Hayes said "the only obvious and important deficit in the ape's innate intelligence, as compared with man's, is a missing facility for using and understanding language".

The faculty argument is common in the field of evolutionary linguistics and biolinguistics. Noam Chomsky called it a "language acquisition device" innate to humans which allows for our use of the matured "language organ" or faculty. Chomsky, conceding that language has share components across multiple species and domains, now uses the terms "Broad" and "Narrow," Narrow being the only human trait of discrete infinity.

== See also ==
- List of individual apes
