= Central Washington University =

Public university in Ellensburg, Washington, US

- Former names: Washington State Normal School (1891–1937); Central Washington College of Education (1937–1961); Central Washington State College (1961–1977)
- Motto: Docendo Discimus (Latin)
- Motto in English: "By teaching we learn"
- Type: Public university
- Established: 1891; 135 years ago
- Accreditation: NWCCU
- Academic affiliations: COP
- Endowment: $47.6 million (2025)
- President: Jim Wohlpart
- Provost: Patrick Pease
- Students: 10,811 (2024)
- Undergraduates: 10,317 (2024)
- Postgraduates: 494 (2024)
- Location: Ellensburg, Washington, United States; 47.002°N 120.540°W
- Campus: 380 acres (150 ha); Distant town
- Other campuses: Des Moines; Joint Base Lewis-McChord; Lynnwood; Tacoma; Yakima; Wenatchee
- Newspaper: The Observer
- Colors: Crimson and black
- Nickname: Wildcats
- Sporting affiliations: NCAA Division II - GNAC
- Mascot: Wellington P. Wildcat
- Website: cwu.edu

Central Washington University (CWU) is a public university in Ellensburg, Washington, United States. It was founded in 1891 as the Washington State Normal School.

The university consists of four divisions: the President's Division, Business and Financial Affairs, Operations, and Academic and Student Life (ASL). Within ASL are four colleges: the College of Arts and Humanities, the College of Business (Ellensburg campus and University Centers in the Puget Sound and central regions), the College of Education and Professional Studies, and College of the Sciences. CWU is considered an emerging Hispanic-Serving Institution and 15 percent of its students are Hispanic.

== History ==
In 1890, the state Legislature established the Washington State Normal School (WSNS) in Ellensburg for "the training and education of teachers in the art of instructing and governing in the public schools of this state." WSNS opened on September 6, 1891, with its first classes held at the Washington Public School in Ellensburg. In 1893, the school's first building was constructed and named Barge Hall, in honor of the first WSNS principal, Benjamin Franklin Barge. Barge Hall was added to the National Register of Historic Places in 1976.

In subsequent years, the university constructed additional campus buildings to accommodate a growing student body including: Kamola Hall (1911); Smyser Hall (1925); Munson Hall (1926); Sue Lombard Hall (1926); and McConnell Auditorium (1935). While Barge Hall's architecture reflected a Richardsonian Romanesque style, the designs of later buildings incorporated elements of proto-Modernism, along with Spanish Colonial Revival, Neo-Classical and Classical Revival styles. In the late 20th and early 21st centuries, as academic programs expanded, construction of new buildings took place: the Science Building (1997); Black Hall (1998); the Student Union and Recreation Center (2006); Jerilyn McIntyre Music Education Facility (2007); Wendell Hill Hall A and B (2008), Hogue Technology Building (2008), Barto Hall (2012), Discovery (2016), the Samuelson STEM Center (2018), Owen Dugmore Hall (2019), and the Northside Academic Complex (NAC)(2026).

In 1937, the Washington Legislature authorized a name change to Central Washington College of Education. In 1961, reflecting that the curriculum had expanded into new areas of study in addition to teacher education, the school's name was changed to Central Washington State College. With addition of graduate programs and curricula, it became Central Washington University in 1977.

In 1998, the United Faculty of Central was founded as a trade union to represent the university's faculty members.

== Residential campus ==
The residential campus location has 20 residence halls that provide On-Campus housing for over 2,500 students.

The STEM, Humanities, and Teaching facilities include Black Hall, Health Sciences, Lind Hall, Discovery Hall, Samuelson Hall, Hogue Technology Building, Dean Hall, Northside Academic Complex (NAC), Michaelson Hall and the Science Building (see map on right).

The Department of Art and Design is located in Randall hall, along with the Sarah Spurgeon Art Gallery.

Discovery Hall is home to CWU's Geology Program. Central Washington Geology has made discoveries in exposing Ice Age mega-floods, Miocene basalt lava flows, and ancient mountain belts made of "micro-continents" that drifted across the Pacific and collided with North America.

Due to the region's unique geological footprint, the Central Washington University specializes heavily on their Geological Sciences fieldwork. CWU professor Nick Zentner has hosted the PBS series "Nick on the Rocks", bringing attention to the region's geology.

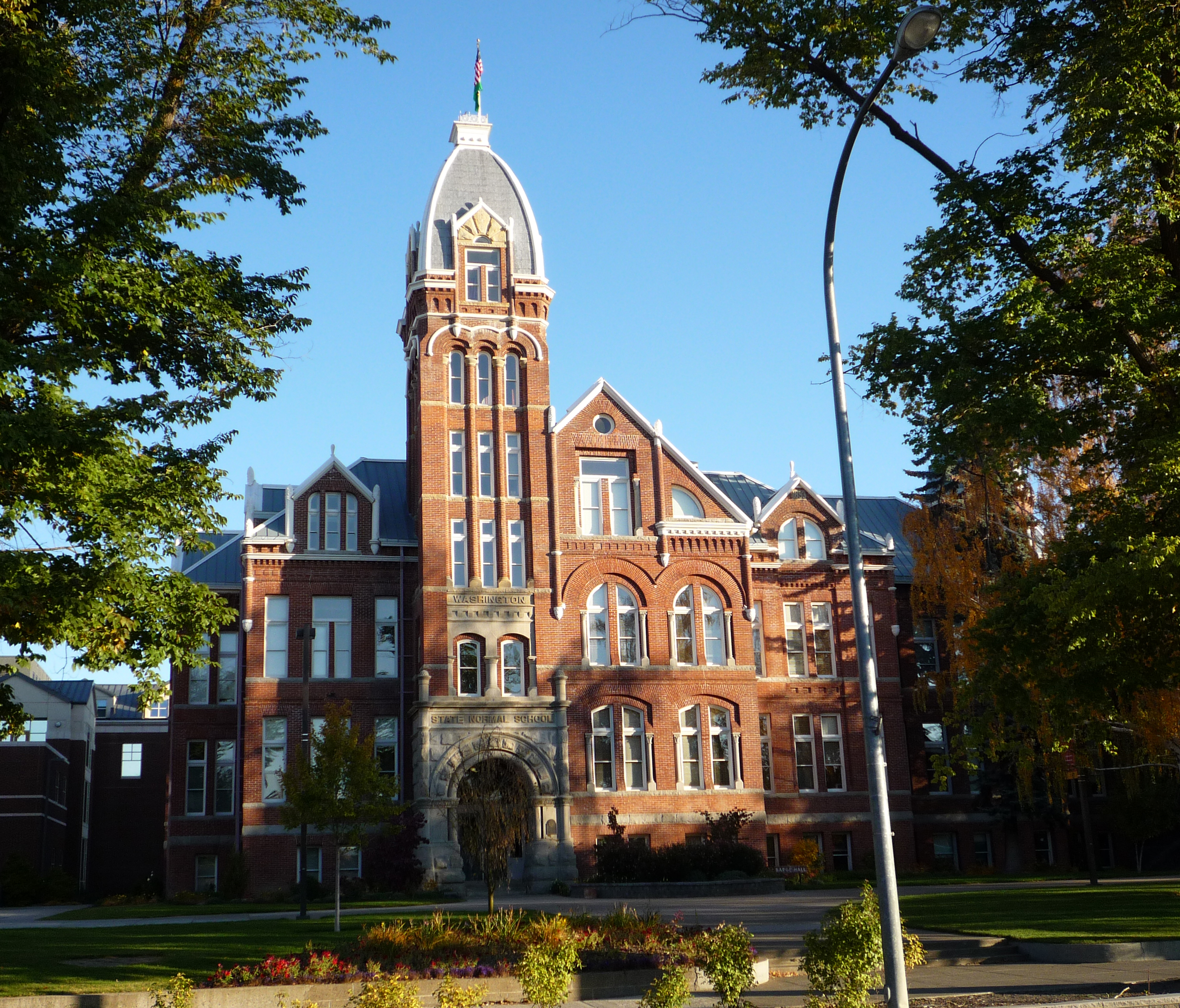
Barge Hall

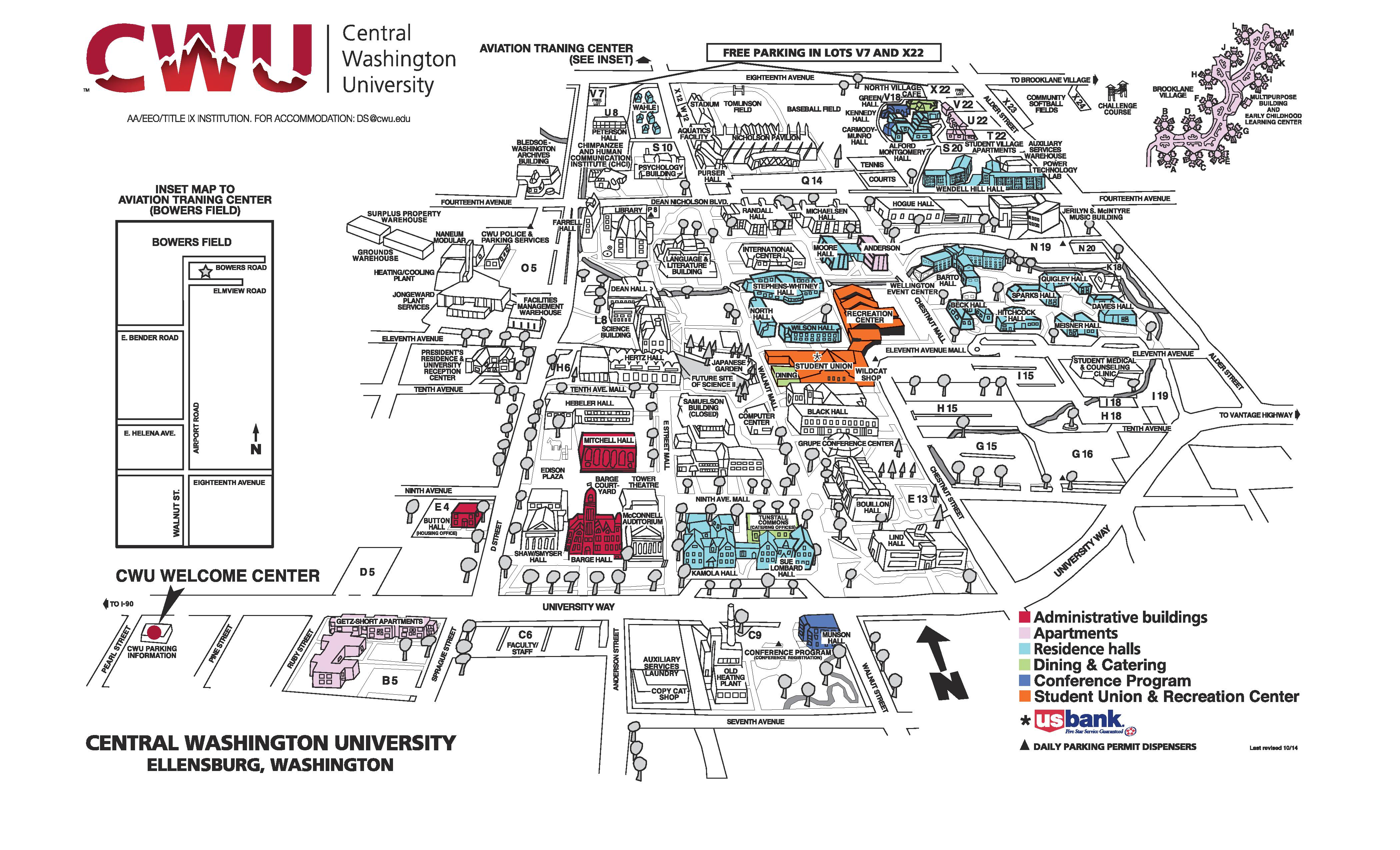
Campus map

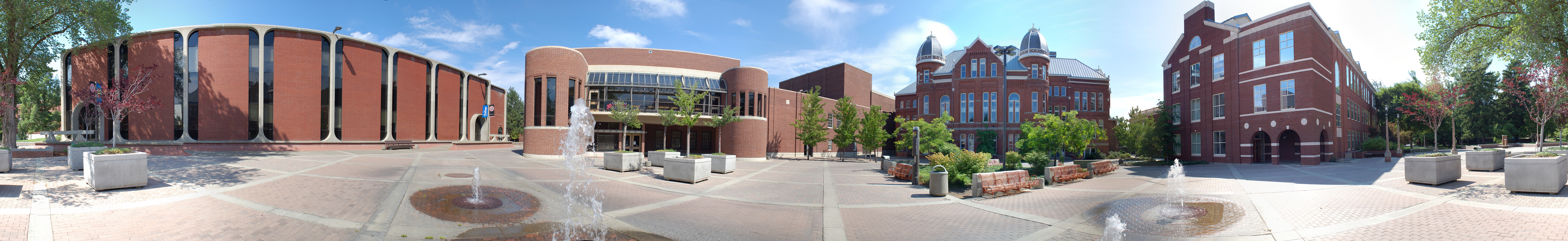
Panorama

=== Administrative buildings ===
Barge Hall, Mitchell Hall, and Bouillon Hall are where the primary administrative staff are located. Admissions, TRIO, Student Engagement and Success, The Office of The Registrar, and Financial Aid are all located in the Bouillon Hall Student First Center. This region is bounded by Samuelson Hall and the residential Kamola Hall and Sue Lombard Hall.

=== Student Union and Recreation Center ===
On April 26, 2006, the school opened the $58 million Student Union and Recreation Center. The Student Union and Recreation Center, or SURC as it is abbreviated by students, is home to a full-sized rock-climbing wall, fully equipped gymnasium, and an outdoor recreation office that rents sports equipment.

=== Wildcat Farm ===
The Wildcat Farm at the eastern side of campus grows fresh produce for CWU Dining Services and provides space for students and faculty to run experiments or projects centered around food and farming. Examples have included studying soil carbon respiration, offering K-12 education programs, and piloting dryland winter wheat production.

Undergraduate demographics as of Fall 2023
Race and ethnicity	Total
White	56%
Hispanic	22%
Two or more races	8%
Black	5%
Asian	4%
International student	2%
Unknown	2%
American Indian/Alaska Native	1%
Native Hawaiian/Pacific Islander	1%
Economic diversity
Low-income (Note: The percentage of students who received an income-based federal Pell grant intended for low-income students.)	34%
Affluent (Note: The percentage of students who are a part of the American middle class at the bare minimum.)	66%

== CWU University Centers ==
In addition to the residential campus in Ellensburg, Central Washington University has multiple locations around the state of Washington.

- CWU-Des Moines, located at Highline Community College
- CWU-Lynnwood, located at Edmonds College
- CWU-Pierce County, located at Pierce College
- CWU-Moses Lake, located at Big Bend Community College
- CWU-Wenatchee, located at Wenatchee Valley College
- CWU-Yakima, located at Yakima Valley College
- CWU-Sammamish, Closed effective June 30, 2025, via an agreement between CWU and the City of Sammamish.

== Research ==
=== Pacific Northwest Geodetic Array (PANGA) ===
The Pacific Northwest Geodetic Array (PANGA) uses real-time GPS measurements to research and measure crustal deformation and mitigate natural hazards throughout the Pacific Northwest. These hazards arise from earthquakes, volcanic eruptions, landslides, and coastal sea-level encroachment. In addition, PANGA GPS measurements are used to monitor man-made structures such as Seattle's sagging Alaskan Way Viaduct (demolished in 2019), the 520 and I-90 floating bridges, and power-generation / drinking-supply dams throughout the Cascadia subduction zone, including the mega-dams along the Columbia River. GPS data are telemetered in real-time back to CWU, where they are processed in real-time using both JPL's RTG software as well as Trimble's RTKNet Integrity Manager software to provide relative positioning of several mm resolution.

=== Primate Behavior and Ecology program ===
The Primate Behavior and Ecology program at Central Washington University offers the only baccalaureate degree in primatology in the world and the sole master's degree in primatology in the United States. The program focuses on non-invasive, observational research with nonhuman primates in field and captive settings. The program also offers the only Captive Primate Care Certificate in the United States and is affiliated with Chimpanzee Sanctuary Northwest. Faculty and students study across the entire primate order, collaborating with scientists and conducting research at sites around the world. Recent published work includes the impact of COVID-19 on mammals at tourism sites, the behavior of Tibetan macaques at the Valley of the Wild Monkeys in China, and the social networks of chimpanzees. The Primate Behavior graduate program is part of the Western Regional Graduate Program, through which student residents of 15 western states pay in-state tuition.

Though the campus no longer houses live primates, the Chimpanzee and Human Communication Institute on the Ellensburg campus cared for Washoe, a notable cross-fostered chimpanzee from 1980-2007.

=== Wine Quality Research Initiative ===
Wine Quality Research Initiative has identified the nature of wine faults in some wines and how to prevent them. Currently the initiative is directed at detecting and preventing wine fraud, a lucrative and growing crime in the wine import/export business.

== Athletics ==
CWU students, alumni, and varsity athletes are known as the "Wildcats" and their colors are crimson and black. CWU is part of NCAA Division II and is part of the Great Northwest Athletic Conference. However, the men's and women's rugby teams are NCAA Division I and are usually nationally ranked.

Seasonal order of Wildcats sports
	Fall	Winter	Spring
Men's	Football, Cross Country, Rugby	Basketball	Baseball, Rugby, Track & Field
Women's	Soccer, Cross Country, Rugby, Volleyball	Basketball	Softball, Rugby, Track & Field
