= International Primate Day =

Annual observance event

International Primate Day, September 1, is an educational observance event organized since 2005 largely by British-based Animal Defenders International (ADI) and supported annually by various primate-oriented advocacy organizations (speaks for all higher and lower primates) who typically endorse humane agendas where primates are at risk- as in research institutions or species endangerment in precarious environmental situations.

The event is increasingly practiced by primate advocacy nonprofits in several nations. AOL News had covered the observance each year since 2005, and Yahoo! News had more recently begun reporting the event.

In 2007, according to Animal Defenders International (ADI), "‘Monkey in a Cage’ by Maria Daines topped the Indie music chart in the week following International Primate Day after a campaign enabling people to download via our websites."

In 2016, Animal Defenders International (ADI) received a celebrity endorsement from Moby for their attempt to help the Barbary macaques for that year's event.

== Overview of primates ==
Primates are a very large order of about 200 species, and include humans, great apes, monkeys, lemurs, et al. Statements on great apes which focus largely or entirely on apes would not include all primates.

== Significance of primate advocacy ==
The release of apes from biomedical laboratories started in Europe and Japan about fifteen years before that movement emerged in North America.

=== Developments in Europe ===
During the past several decades of primate advocacy, the Great Ape Project has emerged, and movements in Europe have seen calls for extended legal protections to Great Apes, the higher primates.

=== Developments in Japan ===
See Japanese macaque

=== Developments in the United States ===
Withdrawal of financial support by NIH in the United States

A study commissioned by the National Institute of Health (NIH) and conducted by the Institute of Medicine (IOM) concluded in a report (see report brief) released on December 15, 2011 that ‘while the chimpanzee has been a valuable animal model in past research, most current use of chimpanzees for biomedical research is unnecessary’. The primary recommendation is that the use of chimpanzees in research be guided by a set of principles and criteria, in effect to greatly limit government-funded research using chimpanzees. Falling short of calling for the out-right ban of using chimpanzees for research, the report acknowledged that new emerging, or re-emerging diseases may require the use of chimpanzees, echoing Professor Colin Blakemore’s concern.

Francis Collins, Director of NIH announced on the same day the report was released that he accepted the recommendations and will develop the implementation plan which includes the forming of an expert committee to review all submitted grant applications and projects already underway involving the use of chimpanzees. Furthermore, no new grant applications using chimpanzees will be reviewed until further notice.

On 21 September 2012, NIH announced that 110 chimpanzees owned by the government will be retired. NIH owns about 500 chimpanzees for research, this move signifies the first step to wind down NIH’s investment in chimpanzee research, according to Francis Collins. Currently housed at the New Iberia Research Center in Louisiana, ten of the retired chimpanzees were to be transferred to the chimpanzee sanctuary Chimp Haven, while the rest were to go to Texas Biomedical Research Institute in San Antonio. However, concerns over the chimpanzee’s status in the Texas Biomedical Research Institute as ‘research ineligible’ rather than ‘retired’ prompted NIH to reconsider the plan; it announced on 17 October 2012 that as many chimpanzees as possible would be relocated to Chimp Haven by August 2013, and that eventually all 110 would be moved there.

On 22 January 2013, a NIH task force released a report calling for the government to retire most of the chimpanzees the U.S. government support. The panel concluded that the animals provide little benefit in biomedical discoveries except in a few disease cases which can be supported by a small population of 50 primates for future research. Other approaches such as genetically altered mice should be developed and refined.

On 13 November 2013, the US Congress and Senate passed ‘The Chimpanzee Health Improvement, Maintenance and Protection Act’, approving the funding to expand the capacity of Chimp Haven and other chimpanzee sanctuaries, thus allowing the transfer of almost all of the apes owned by the federal government to live in a more natural and group environment than in the laboratory. The transfer is expected to take five years when all but 50 chimpanzees, which will remain with the NIH, will be ‘retired’.

== Declaration on Great Apes ==
The Great Ape Project is campaigning to have the United Nations endorse a Declaration on Great Apes. This would extend what the project calls the "community of equals" to include chimpanzees, gorillas and orangutans. The declaration seeks to extend to non-human great apes the protection of three basic interests: the right to life, the protection of individual liberty, and the prohibition of torture.

=== Right to life ===
The declaration states that members of the community of equals, which includes humans, may not be killed except in certain strictly defined circumstances such as self-defense.

=== Protection of individual liberty ===
The declaration states that members of the community of equals are not to be deprived of their liberty, and are entitled to immediate release where there has been no form of due process. Under the proposed declaration, the detention of great apes who have not been convicted of any crime or who are not criminally liable should be permitted only where it can be shown that the detention is in their own interests or is necessary to protect the public. The declaration says there must be a right of appeal, either directly or through an advocate, to a judicial tribunal.

=== Prohibition of torture ===
The declaration prohibits the torture, defined as the deliberate infliction of severe pain, on any great ape, whether wantonly or because of a perceived benefit to others. Under International Human Rights Law this is a jus cogens principle and under all major human rights documents it cannot at any time be derogated by any State.

=== Criticism ===
At present, the Declaration on Great Apes is not generally supported by all primatologists.

Several organizations, including GRASP, the Great Apes Survival Project, are more concerned with apes in the wild than with legal issues surrounding the relatively few apes in captivity.

== See also ==
- Animal testing on non-human primates
- Changing levels of support for great ape invasive research
- Declaration on Great Apes
- Endangered Species Act (USA)
- Great Ape personhood
- Great Ape Project
- Great Ape Trust
- Great Apes Survival Partnership
- International primate trade
- Iowa Primate Learning Sanctuary
- Kinshasa Declaration on Great Apes
- List of primates by population
- Monkey Day
- Monkey Jungle
- Monkey Life (TV series)
- Monkey Sanctuary
- Non-human primate experiments
- Primarily Primates (US primate sanctuary)
- Primatology
- Silver Spring monkeys
- The World's 25 Most Endangered Primates
- University of Minnesota primate research
- Western Animal Rights Network (UK)
- World Animal Day
- World Wildlife Day
- Wow! Gorillas
- Yerkes National Primate Research Center

Primate trade:

- International primate trade
- Nafovanny

General:

- Animal Liberation Front
- Animal liberation movement
- Animal testing
- Project R&R: Release and Restitution for Chimpanzees in U.S. Laboratories

Philosophers concerned with primates

- Peter Singer
- Paul Waldau
- Steven Wise
