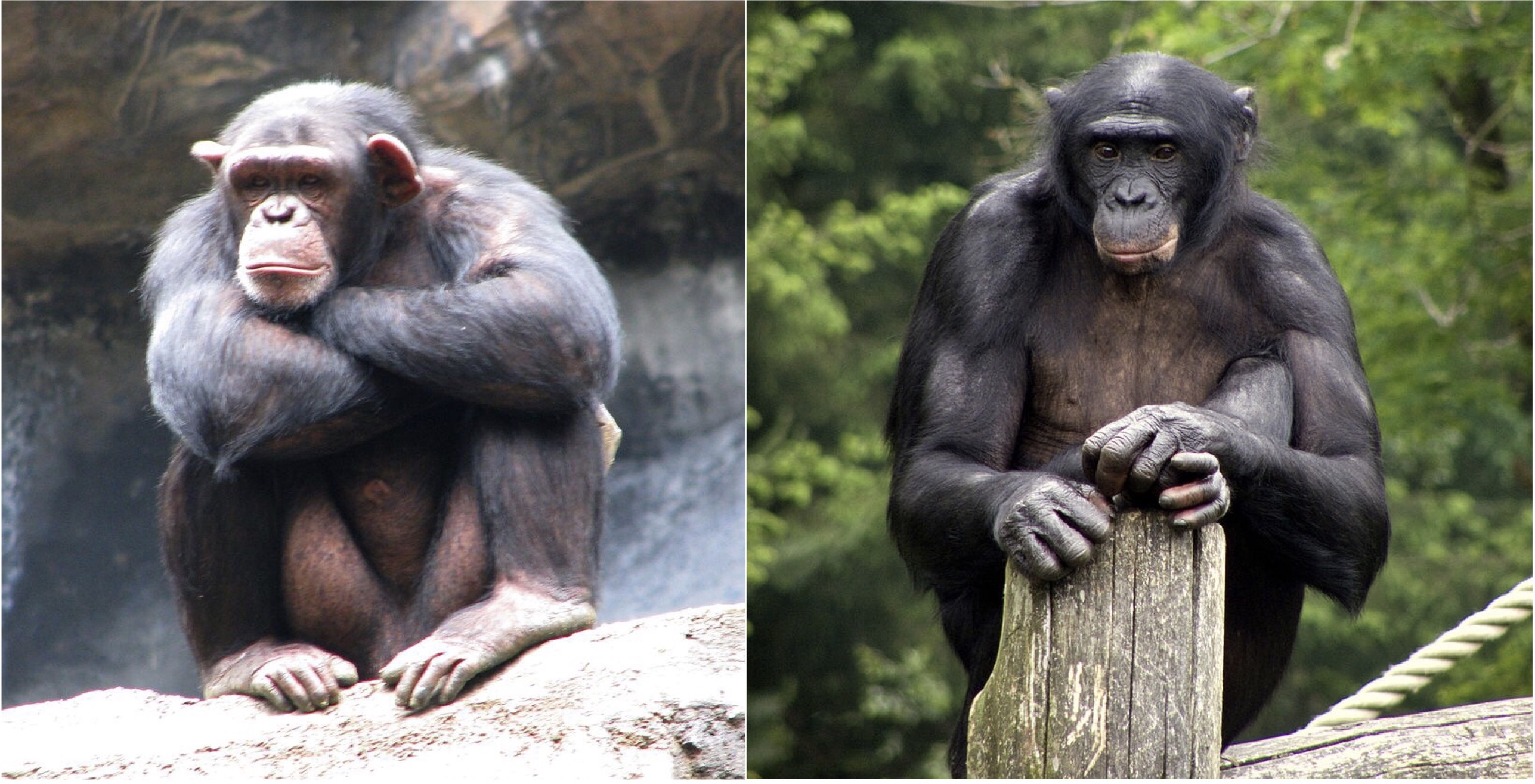
- Members of the genus Pan: chimpanzee (left) and bonobo (right)

Scientific classification
- Kingdom: Animalia
- Phylum: Chordata
- Class: Mammalia
- Order: Primates
- Superfamily: Hominoidea
- Family: Hominidae
- Subtribe: Panina
- Genus: Pan; Oken, 1816

Type species
- Simia troglodytes Blumenbach, 1776

Species
- Pan troglodytes Pan paniscus
- Distribution of Pan troglodytes (common chimpanzee) and Pan paniscus (bonobo, in red)

Synonyms
- Troglodytes E. Geoffroy, 1812 (preoccupied); Mimetes Leach, 1820 (preoccupied); Theranthropus Brookes, 1828; Chimpansee Voight, 1831; Anthropopithecus Blainville, 1839; Hylanthropus Gloger, 1841; Pseudanthropus Reichenbach, 1862; Engeco Haeckel, 1866; Fsihego DePauw, 1905

= Pan (genus) =

Chimpanzees and bonobos Temporal range: Middle Pliocene – present

Genus of African great ape

The genus Pan consists of two extant species: the bonobo and the chimpanzee. Taxonomically, these two ape species are collectively termed panins; however, both species are more commonly referred to collectively using the generalized term chimpanzees, or chimps. Together with humans, gorillas, and orangutans, they are part of the family Hominidae (the great apes, or hominids). Native to sub-Saharan Africa, chimpanzees and bonobos are currently both found in the Congo jungle, while only the chimpanzee is also found further north in West Africa. Both species are listed as endangered on the IUCN Red List of Threatened Species, and in 2017 the Convention on Migratory Species selected the chimpanzee for special protection.

== Chimpanzee and bonobo: comparison ==
The chimpanzee (P. troglodytes), which lives north of the Congo River, and the bonobo (P. paniscus), which lives south of it, were once considered to be the same species, but since 1928 they have been recognized as distinct. In addition, P. troglodytes is divided into four subspecies, while P. paniscus is undivided. Based on genome sequencing, these two extant Pan species diverged around one million years ago.

The most obvious differences are that chimpanzees are somewhat larger, more aggressive and male-dominated, while the bonobos are more gracile, peaceful, and female-dominated. Their hair is typically black or brown. Males and females differ in size and appearance. Both chimpanzees and bonobos are some of the most social great apes, with social bonds occurring throughout large communities. Fruit is the most important component of a chimpanzee's diet; but they will also eat vegetation, bark, honey, insects and even other chimpanzees or monkeys. They can live over 30 years in both the wild and captivity.

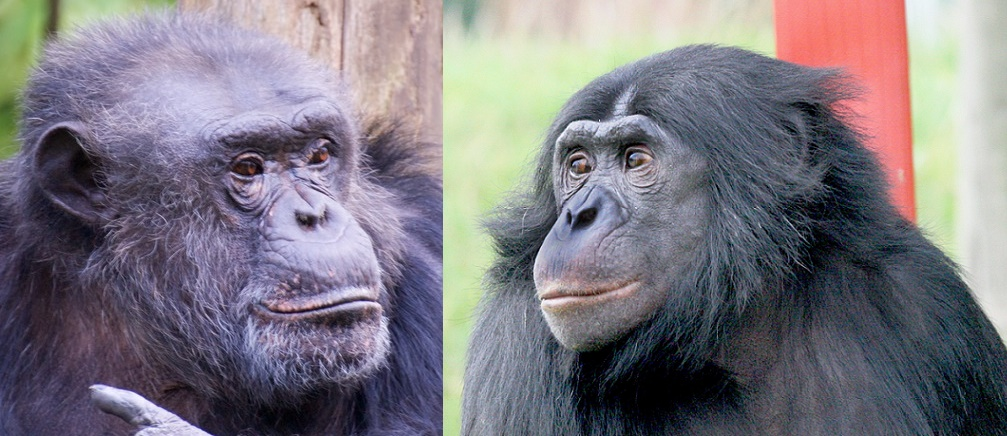
Chimpanzee (Pan troglodytes) (left) and bonobo (Pan paniscus) (right)

Chimpanzees and bonobos are equally humanity's closest living relatives. They use a variety of sophisticated tools and construct elaborate sleeping nests each night from branches and foliage. Their learning abilities have been extensively studied. There may even be distinctive cultures within populations. Field studies of Pan troglodytes were pioneered by primatologist Jane Goodall.

== Names ==
The genus name Pan was first introduced by Lorenz Oken in 1816. While Oken did not give a rationale for his choice, it is generally thought to have been inspired by the name of the Greek god Pan. An alternative Theranthropus was suggested by Brookes 1828 and Chimpansee by Voigt 1831. Troglodytes was not available, as it had been given as the name of a genus of wren in 1809, for "cave-dweller", reflecting the tendency of some wrens to forage in dark crevices. The International Commission on Zoological Nomenclature adopted Pan as the only official name of the genus in 1895, though the "cave-dweller" connection was able to be included, albeit at the species level (Pan troglodytes – the common chimpanzee) for one of the two species of Pan.

The first use of the name "chimpanze" is recorded in The London Magazine in 1738, glossed as meaning "mockman" in a language of "the Angolans" (apparently from a Bantu language; reportedly modern Vili (Civili), a Zone H Bantu language, has the comparable ci-mpenzi). The spelling chimpanzee is found in a 1758 supplement to Chamber's Cyclopædia. The colloquialism "chimp" was most likely coined some time in the late 1870s.

The chimpanzee was named Simia troglodytes by Johann Friedrich Blumenbach in 1776. The species name troglodytes is a reference to the Troglodytae (literally "cave-goers"), an African people described by Greco-Roman geographers. Blumenbach first used it in his De generis humani varietate nativa liber ("On the natural varieties of the human genus") in 1776, Linnaeus 1758 had already used Homo troglodytes for a hypothetical mixture of human and orangutan.

The bonobo, in the past also referred to as the "pygmy chimpanzee", was given the species name of paniscus by Ernst Schwarz (1929), a Greek-style diminutive of the theonym Pan used by Cicero.

== Distribution and habitat ==
There are two species of the genus Pan, both previously called simply chimpanzees:

1. Chimpanzees or Pan troglodytes, are found almost exclusively in the heavily forested regions of Central and West Africa. With at least four commonly accepted subspecies, their population and distribution is much more extensive than the bonobos, in the past also called 'pygmy chimpanzee'.
2. Bonobos, Pan paniscus, are found only in Central Africa, south of the Congo River and north of the Kasai River (a tributary of the Congo), in the humid forest of the Democratic Republic of Congo of Central Africa.

Genus Pan – Oken, 1816 – two species
Common name	Scientific name and subspecies	Range	Size and ecology	IUCN status and estimated population
Bonobo	P. paniscus Schwarz, 1929	Central Africa	Size: 70–83 cm (28–33 in) long Habitat: Forest Diet: Fruits and seeds, as well as leaves, stems, shoots, pith, bark, flowers, truffles, fungus, and honey	EN Unknown
Chimpanzee	P. troglodytes (Blumenbach, 1775) Four subspecies: P. t. ellioti (Nigeria-Cameroon chimpanzee); P. t. schweinfurthii (Eastern chimpanzee); P. t. troglodytes (Central chimpanzee); P. t. verus (Western chimpanzee)	Central and western Africa	Size: 63–90 cm (25–35 in) long Habitat: Forest and savanna Diet: Fruit, leaves, stems, buds, bark, pith, seeds, and resins, as well as insects, small vertebrates, and eggs	EN Unknown

== Evolutionary history ==
=== Evolutionary relationship ===
Phylogeny of superfamily Hominoidea

- Hominoidea
  - gibbons (family Hylobatidae)
  - - orangutans (genus Pongo)
    - - gorillas (genus Gorilla)
      - - humans (genus Homo)
        - chimpanzees (genus Pan)

The genus Pan is part of the subfamily Homininae, to which humans also belong. The lineages of chimpanzees and humans separated in a process of speciation between roughly five to twelve million years ago, making them humanity's closest living relative. Research by Mary-Claire King in 1973 found 99% identical DNA between human beings and chimpanzees. For some time, research modified that finding to about 94% commonality, with some of the difference occurring in noncoding DNA, but more recent knowledge puts the difference in DNA between humans, chimpanzees and bonobos at just about 1%–1.2% again.

=== Fossils ===
The chimpanzee fossil record has long been absent and thought to have been due to the preservation bias in relation to their environment. However, in 2005, chimpanzee fossils were discovered and described by Sally McBrearty and colleagues. Existing chimpanzee populations in West and Central Africa are separate from the major human fossil sites in East Africa; however, chimpanzee fossils have been reported from Kenya, indicating that both humans and members of the Pan clade were present in the East African Rift Valley during the Middle Pleistocene.

== Anatomy and physiology ==
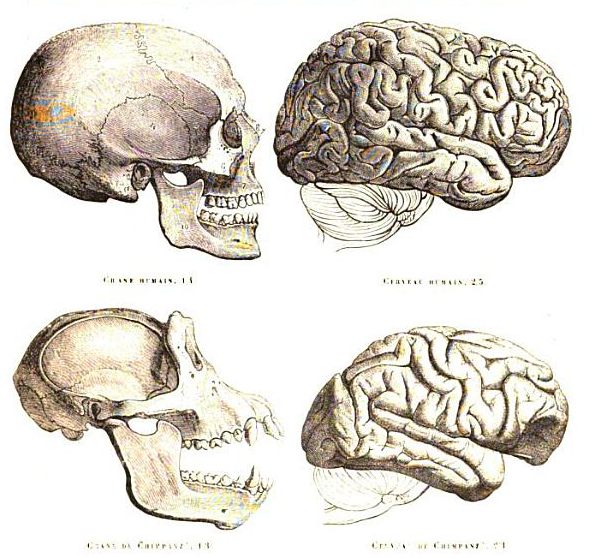
Human and chimpanzee skulls and brains (not to scale), as illustrated in Gervais' Histoire naturelle des mammifères

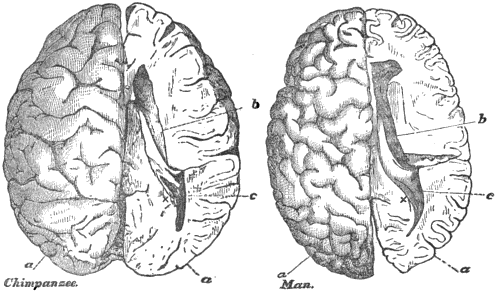
The chimpanzee's brain on the left and the human brain on the right have been scaled to the same size to show the relative proportions of their parts. These drawings were in a book made in 1904 by Thomas Henry Huxley.

The chimpanzee's arms are longer than its legs. The male common chimp stands up to 1.2 m (3.9 ft) high. Male adult wild chimps weigh between 40 and 60 kg with females weighing between 27 and 50 kg. When extended, the common chimp's long arms span one and a half times the body's height. The bonobo is slightly shorter and thinner than the common chimpanzee, but has longer limbs. In trees, both species climb with their long, powerful arms; on the ground, chimpanzees usually knuckle-walk, or walk on all fours, clenching their fists and supporting themselves on the knuckles. Chimpanzees are better suited for walking than orangutans, because the chimp's feet have broader soles and shorter toes. The bonobo has proportionately longer upper limbs and walks upright more often than does the common chimpanzee. Both species can walk upright on two legs when carrying objects with their hands and arms.

Comparison of size of adult chimpanzee and adult human.

The chimpanzee is tailless; its coat is dark; its face, fingers, palms of the hands, and soles of the feet are hairless. The exposed skin of the face, hands, and feet varies from pink to very dark in both species, but is generally lighter in younger individuals and darkens with maturity. A University of Chicago Medical Centre study has found significant genetic differences between chimpanzee populations. A bony shelf over the eyes gives the forehead a receding appearance, and the nose is flat. Although the jaws protrude, a chimp's lips are thrust out only when it pouts.

The brain of a chimpanzee has been measured at a general range of 282–500 cm^{3}. The human brain, in contrast, is about three times larger, with a reported average volume of about 1330 cm^{3}.

Chimpanzees reach puberty between the age of eight and ten years. A chimpanzee's testicles are unusually large for its body size, with a combined weight of about 4 oz (110 g) compared to a gorilla's 1 oz (28 g) or a human's 1.5 ounces (43 g). This relatively great size is generally attributed to sperm competition due to the polygynandrous nature of chimpanzee mating behaviour. Unlike gorillas, chimpanzees and bonobos have long and filiform penises without a glans.

== Longevity ==
In the wild, chimpanzees live to their 30s, while some captured chimps have reached an age of 70 years and older.

=== Muscle strength ===
Chimpanzees are known for possessing great amount of muscle strength, especially in their arms. However, compared to humans the amount of strength reported in media and popular science is greatly exaggerated with numbers of four to eight times the muscle strength of a human. These numbers stem from two studies in 1923 and 1926 by a biologist named John Bauman. These studies were refuted in 1943 and an adult male chimpanzee was found to pull about the same weight as an adult man. Corrected for their smaller body sizes, chimpanzees were found to be stronger than humans but not anywhere near four to eight times. In the 1960s these tests were repeated and chimpanzees were found to have twice the strength of a human when it came to pulling weights. The reason chimpanzees are stronger than humans is thought to be that their longer skeletal muscle fibers can generate twice the work output over a wider range of motion compared to those of humans.

== Behaviour ==
In the twenty-first century, field researchers have increasingly used camera traps and remote microphones to minimize the impact of direct human observation.

=== Chimpanzee vs. bonobo ===
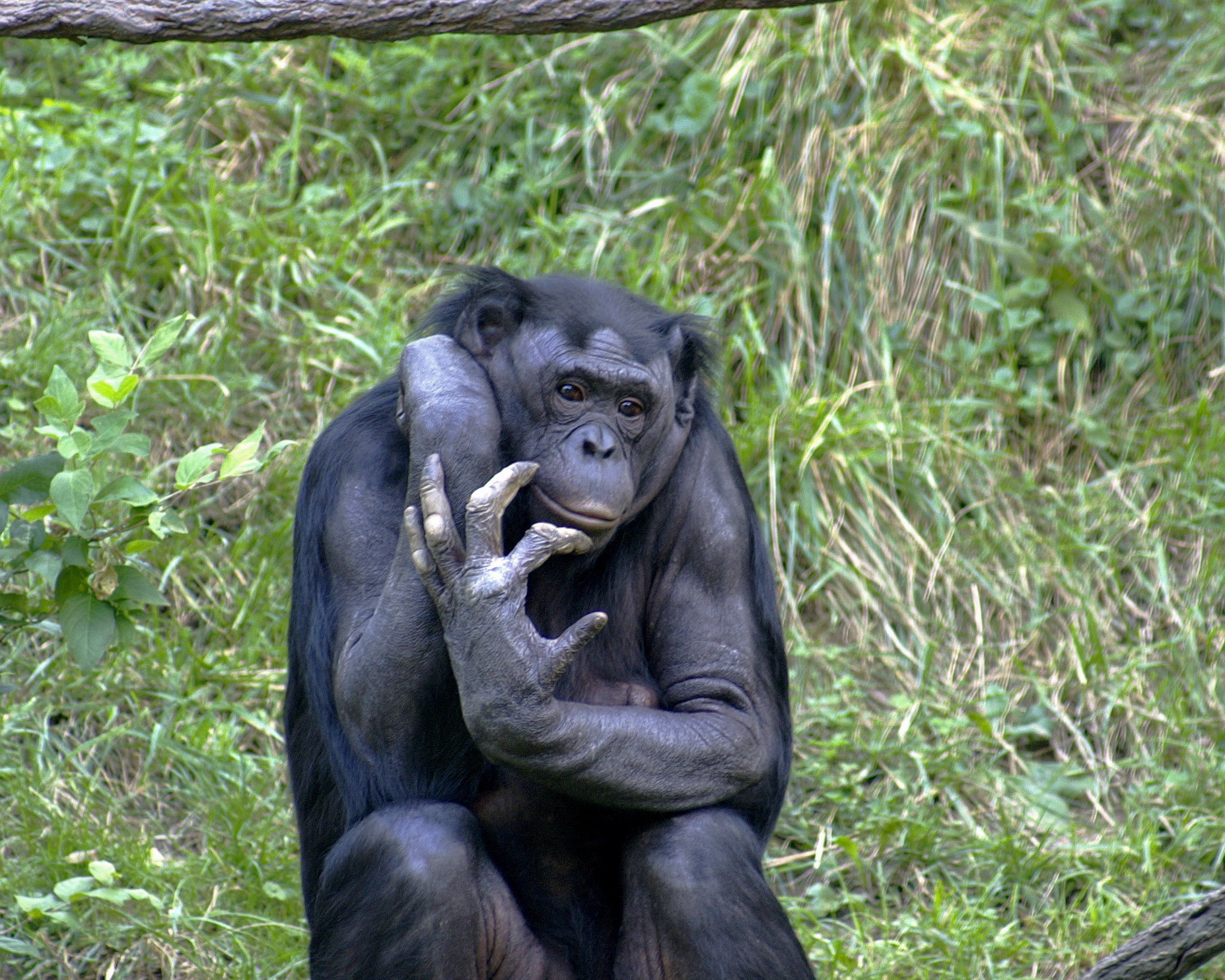
Bonobo

Female chimpanzee at Tobu Zoo in Saitama, Japan

Anatomical differences between the common chimpanzee and the bonobo are slight. Both are omnivorous, adapted to a mainly frugivorous diet. However, sexual and social behaviours differ. Chimpanzees have a troop culture based on beta males led by an alpha male. The bonobo, on the other hand, has more egalitarian, matriarchal, and sexually receptive behaviour. Bonobos frequently have sex, sometimes to help prevent and resolve conflicts. Different groups of chimpanzees also have different cultural behaviour with preferences for types of tools. Chimpanzee aggression tends to be more severe and deadly than bonobo aggression. The average captive chimpanzee sleeps 9 hours and 42 minutes per day.

Contrary to what the scientific name (Pan troglodytes) may suggest, chimpanzees do not typically spend their time in caves, but there have been reports of some of them seeking refuge in caves because of the heat during daytime.

=== Chimpanzees ===
==== Social structure ====
Chimpanzees live in large multi-male and multi-female social groups, which are called communities. Within a community, the position of an individual and the influence the individual has on others dictates a definite social hierarchy. Chimpanzees live in a leaner hierarchy wherein more than one individual may be dominant enough to dominate other members of lower rank. Typically, a dominant male is referred to as the alpha male. The alpha male is the highest-ranking male that controls the group and maintains order during disputes. In chimpanzee society, the 'dominant male' sometimes is not the largest or strongest male but rather the most manipulative and political male that can influence the goings on within a group. Male chimpanzees typically attain dominance by cultivating allies who will support that individual during future ambitions for power. The alpha male regularly displays by puffing his normally slim coat up to increase view size and charge to seem as threatening and as powerful as possible; this behaviour serves to intimidate other members and thereby maintain power and authority, and it may be fundamental to the alpha male's holding on to his status. Lower-ranking chimpanzees will show respect by submissively gesturing in body language or reaching out their hands while grunting. Female chimpanzees will show deference to the alpha male by presenting their hindquarters.

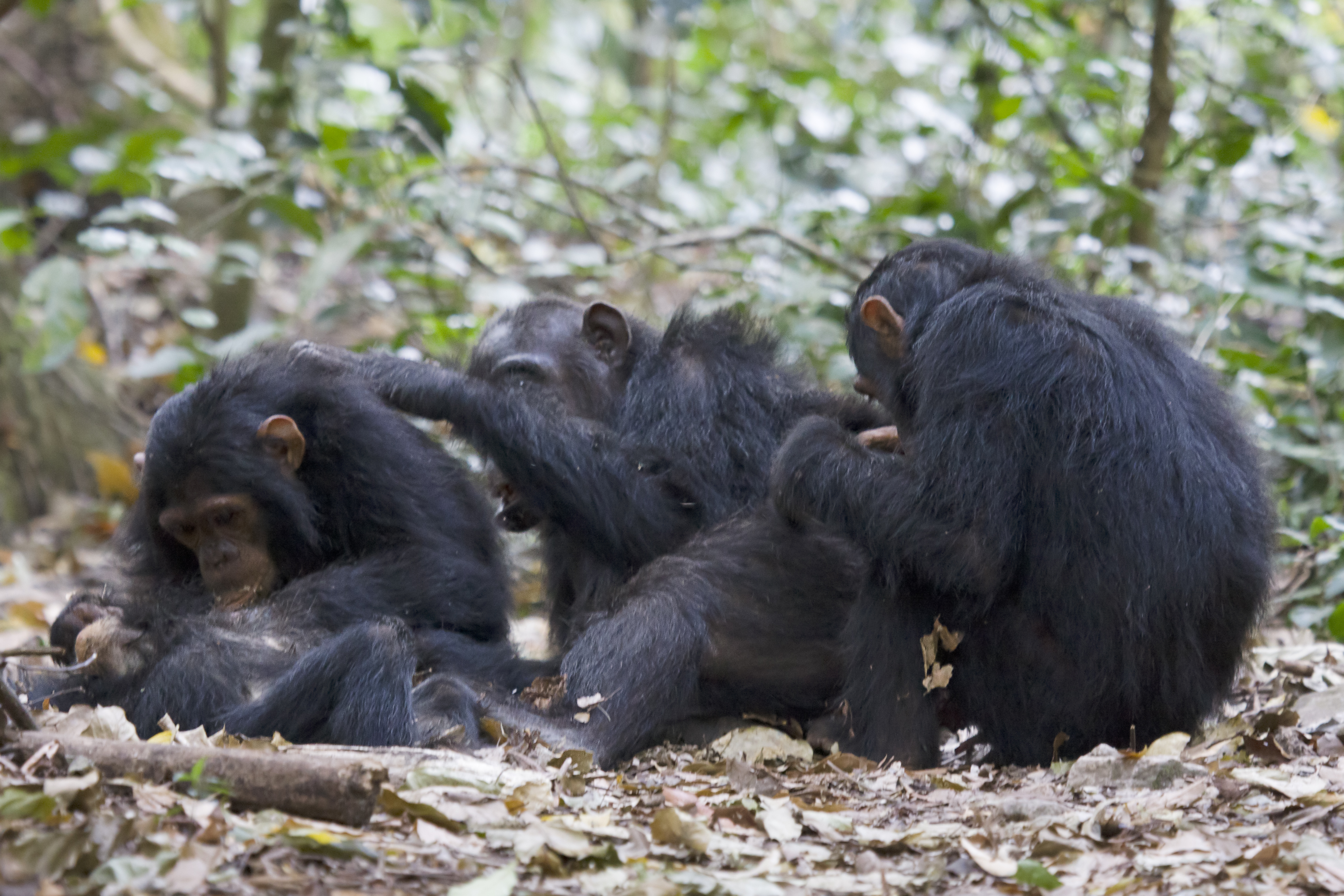
Common chimpanzees in Gombe Stream National Park

Female chimpanzees also have a hierarchy, which is influenced by the position of a female individual within a group. In some chimpanzee communities, the young females may inherit high status from a high-ranking mother. Dominant females will also ally to dominate lower-ranking females: whereas males mainly seek dominant status for its associated mating privileges and sometimes violent domination of subordinates, females seek dominant status to acquire resources such as food, as high-ranking females often have first access to them. Both genders acquire dominant status to improve social standing within a group.

Community female acceptance is necessary for alpha male status; females must ensure that their group visits places that supply them with enough food. A group of dominant females will sometimes oust an alpha male which is not to their preference and back another male, in whom they see potential for leading the group as a successful alpha male.

The mating system within each community is polygynandrous, with each male and female possibly having multiple sexual partners.

==== Intelligence ====
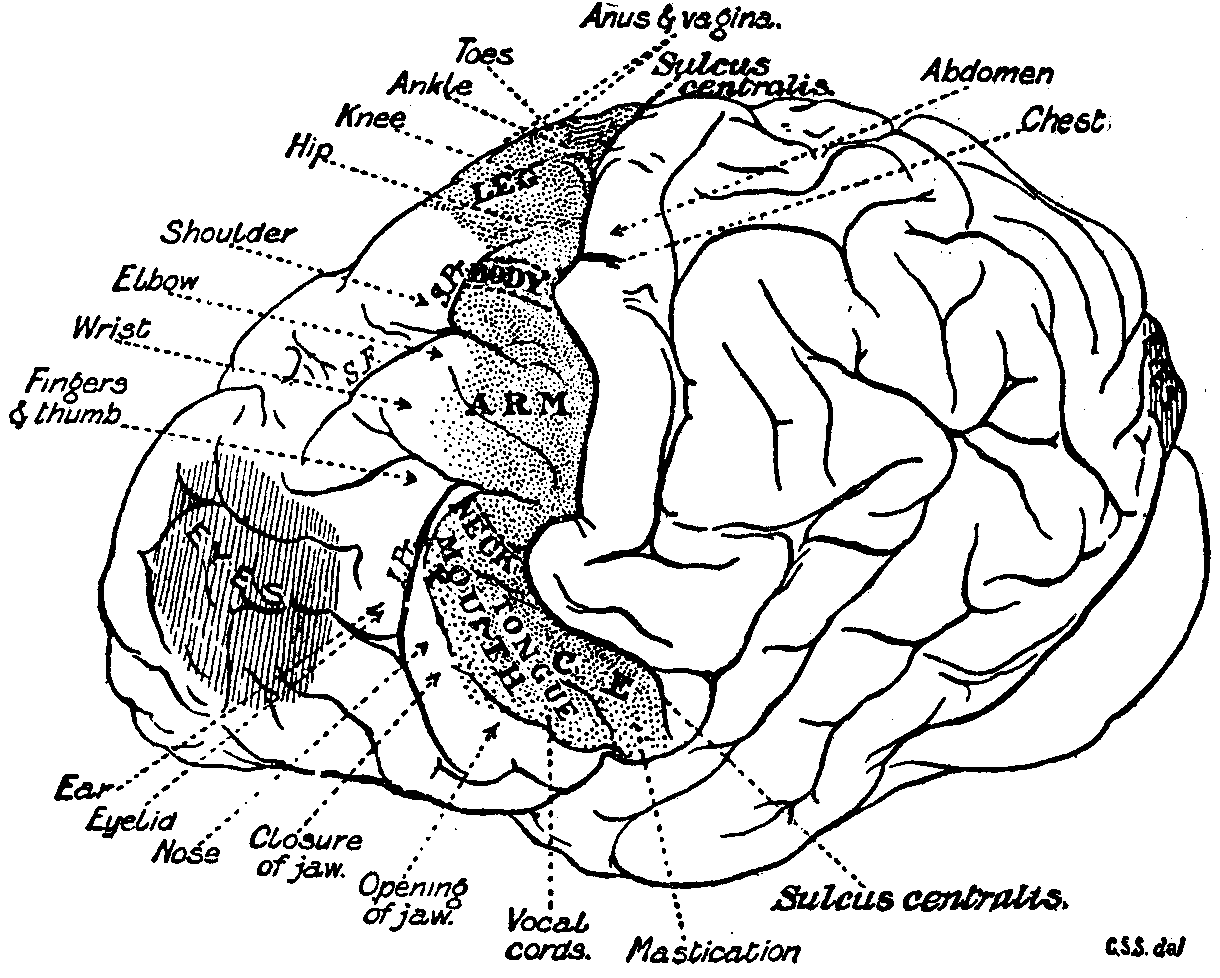
Diagram of brain – topography of the main groups of foci in the motor field of chimpanzee

Chimpanzees make tools and use them to acquire foods and for social displays; they have sophisticated hunting strategies requiring cooperation, influence and rank; they are status conscious, manipulative and capable of deception; they can learn to use symbols and understand aspects of human language including some relational syntax, concepts of number and numerical sequence; and they are capable of spontaneous planning for a future state or event.

==== Tool use ====
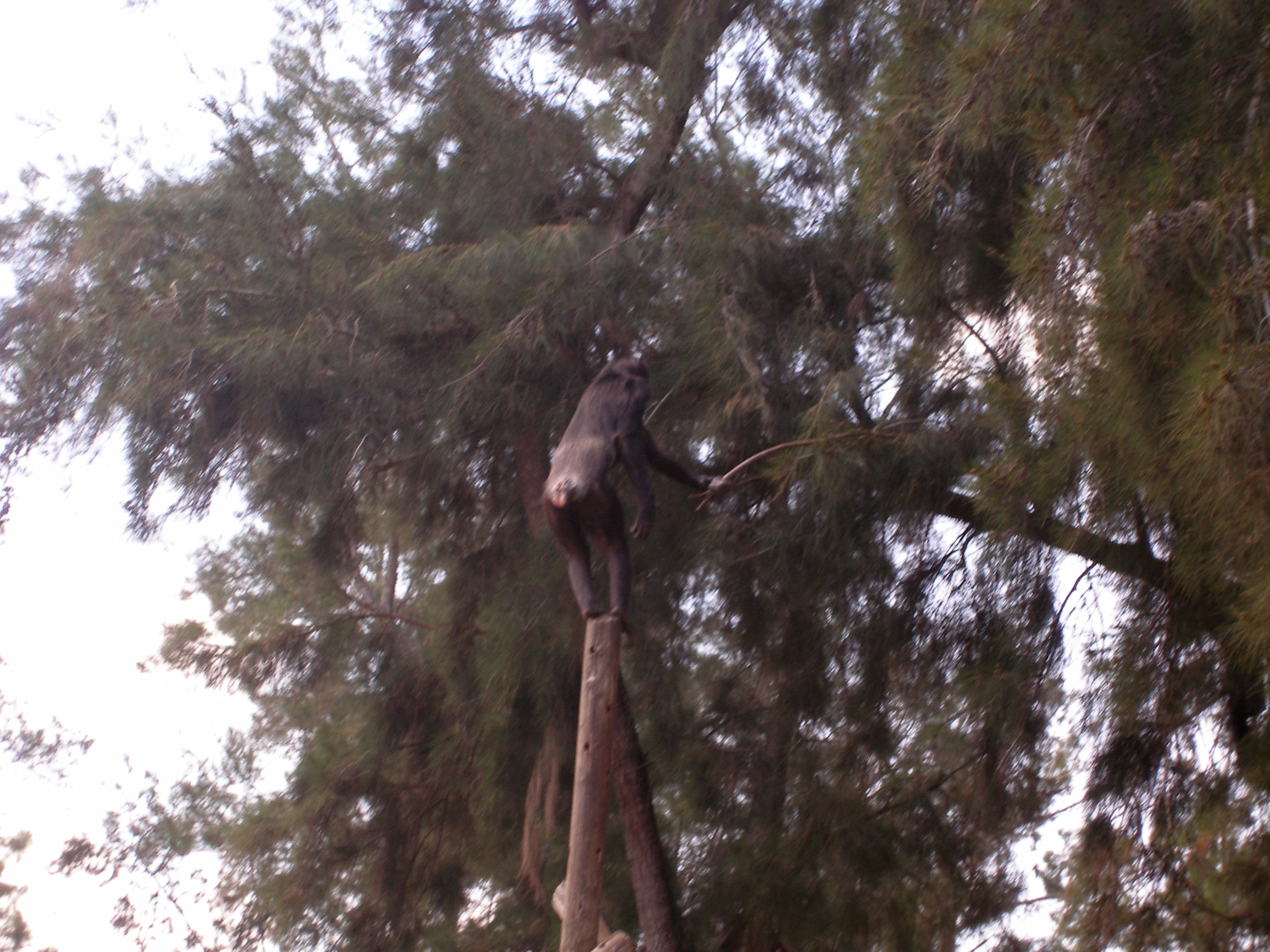
Common chimpanzee using a stick

In October 1960, Jane Goodall observed the use of tools among chimpanzees. Recent research indicates that chimpanzees' use of stone tools dates back at least 4,300 years (about 2,300 BC). One example of chimpanzee tool usage behavior includes the use of a large stick as a tool to dig into termite mounds, and the subsequent use of a small stick altered into a tool that is used to "fish" the termites out of the mound. Chimpanzees are also known to use smaller stones as hammers and a large one as an anvil in order to break open nuts.

In the 1970s, reports of chimpanzees using rocks or sticks as weapons were anecdotal and controversial. However, a 2007 study claimed to reveal the use of spears, which common chimpanzees in Senegal sharpen with their teeth and use to stab and pry Senegal bushbabies out of small holes in trees.

Prior to the discovery of tool use by chimpanzees, humans were believed to be the only species to make and use tools; however, several other tool-using species are now known.

==== Nest-building ====
Nest-building, sometimes considered to be a form of tool use, is seen when chimpanzees construct arboreal night nests by lacing together branches from one or more trees to build a safe, comfortable place to sleep; infants learn this process by watching their mothers. The nest provides a sort of mattress, which is supported by strong branches for a foundation, and then lined with softer leaves and twigs; the minimum diameter is 5 metres (16 ft) and may be located at a height of 3 to 45 metres (10 to 150 ft). Both day and night nests are built, and may be located in groups. A study in 2014 found that the muhimbi tree is favoured for nest building by chimpanzees in Uganda due to its physical properties, such as bending strength, inter-node distance, and leaf surface area.

==== Altruism and emotivity ====
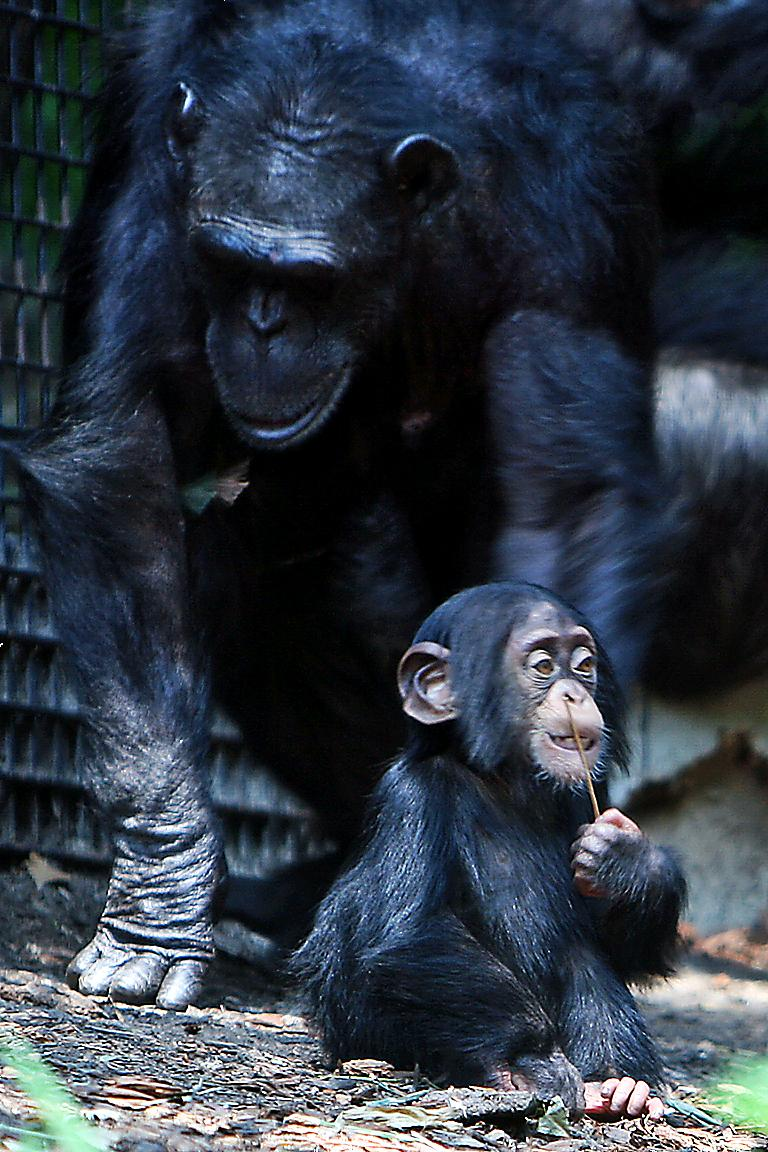
Chimpanzee mother and baby

Studies have shown chimpanzees engage in apparently altruistic behaviour within groups. Some researchers have suggested that chimpanzees are indifferent to the welfare of unrelated group members, but a more recent study of wild chimpanzees found that both male and female adults would adopt orphaned young of their group. Also, different groups sometimes share food, form coalitions, and cooperate in hunting and border patrolling. Sometimes, chimpanzees have adopted young that come from unrelated groups. And in some rare cases, even male chimpanzees have been shown to take care of abandoned infant chimpanzees of an unrelated group, though in most cases they would kill the infant.

According to a literature summary by James W. Harrod, evidence for chimpanzee emotivity includes display of mourning; "incipient romantic love"; "rain dances" (Note: At the onset of thunderstorms or sudden wind gusts chimpanzee males' hair bristles; they perform spectacular aggression displays, charging, waying back and forth, breaking off and brandishing branches. Such displays are performed more often toward the beginning of the rainy season... Rain dance is habitual at Tai Forest and Budongo and customary at Gombe, Mahale-M, Mahale-K and Kibale (Whiten et al 1999).); appreciation of natural beauty (such as a sunset over a lake); curiosity and respect towards other wildlife (such as the python, which is neither a threat nor a food source to chimpanzees); altruism toward other species (such as feeding turtles); and animism, or "pretend play", when chimpanzees cradle and groom rocks or sticks.

==== Communication between chimpanzees ====
Chimpanzees communicate in a manner that is similar to that of human nonverbal communication, using vocalizations, hand gestures, and facial expressions. There is some evidence that they can recreate human speech. Research into the chimpanzee brain has revealed that when chimpanzees communicate, an area in the brain is activated which is in the same position as the language center called Broca's area in human brains.

==== Aggression ====
Adult common chimpanzees, particularly males, can be very aggressive. They are highly territorial and are known to kill others of their species.

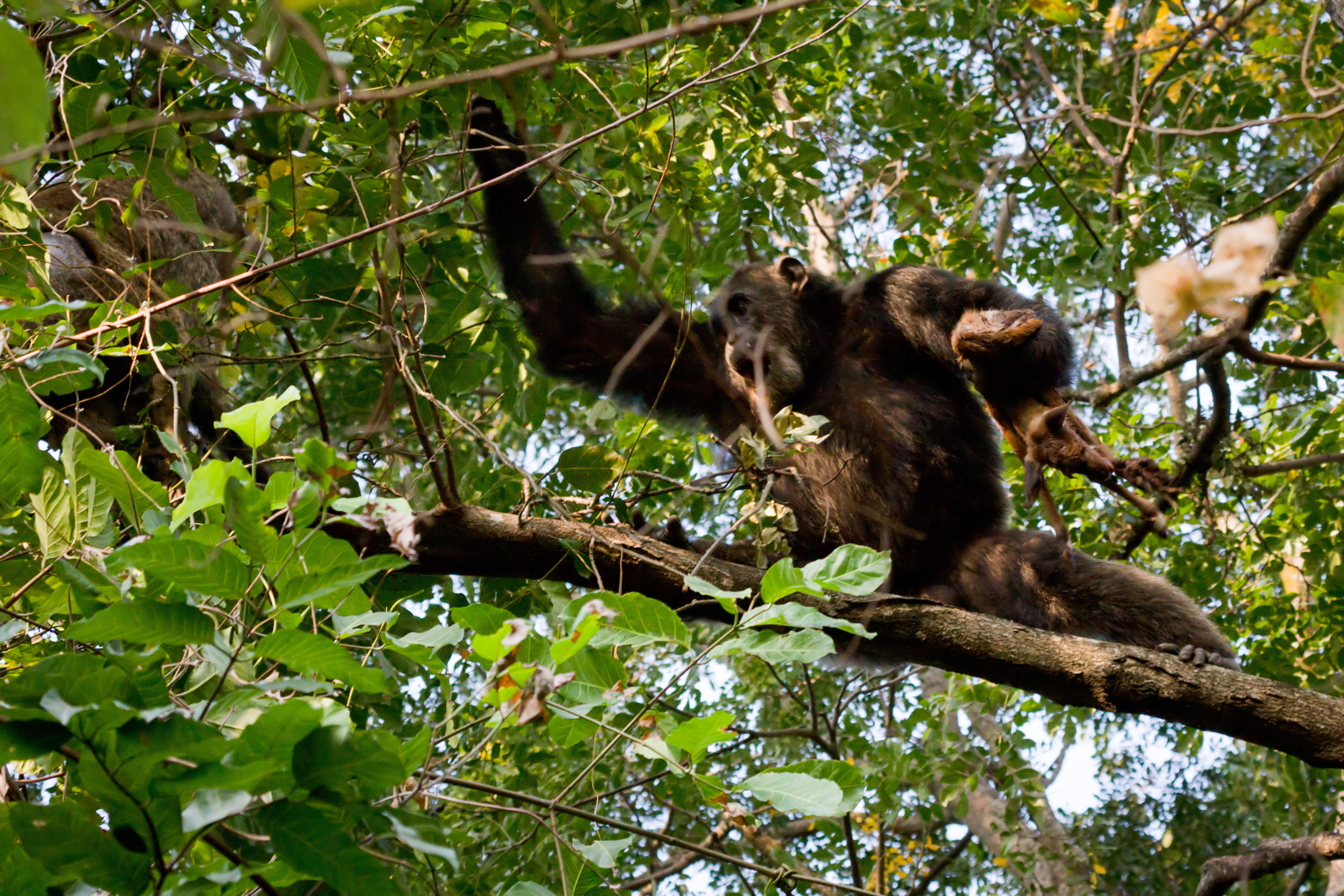
Common chimpanzee with hunted bushbuck on a tree in Gombe Stream National Park

==== Hunting ====
Chimpanzees also engage in targeted hunting of smaller primates, such as the red colobus and bush babies. Males who acquire the meat may share it with females to have sex or for grooming.

==== Puzzle solving ====
In February 2013, a study found that chimpanzees solve puzzles for entertainment.

== Chimpanzees in human history ==
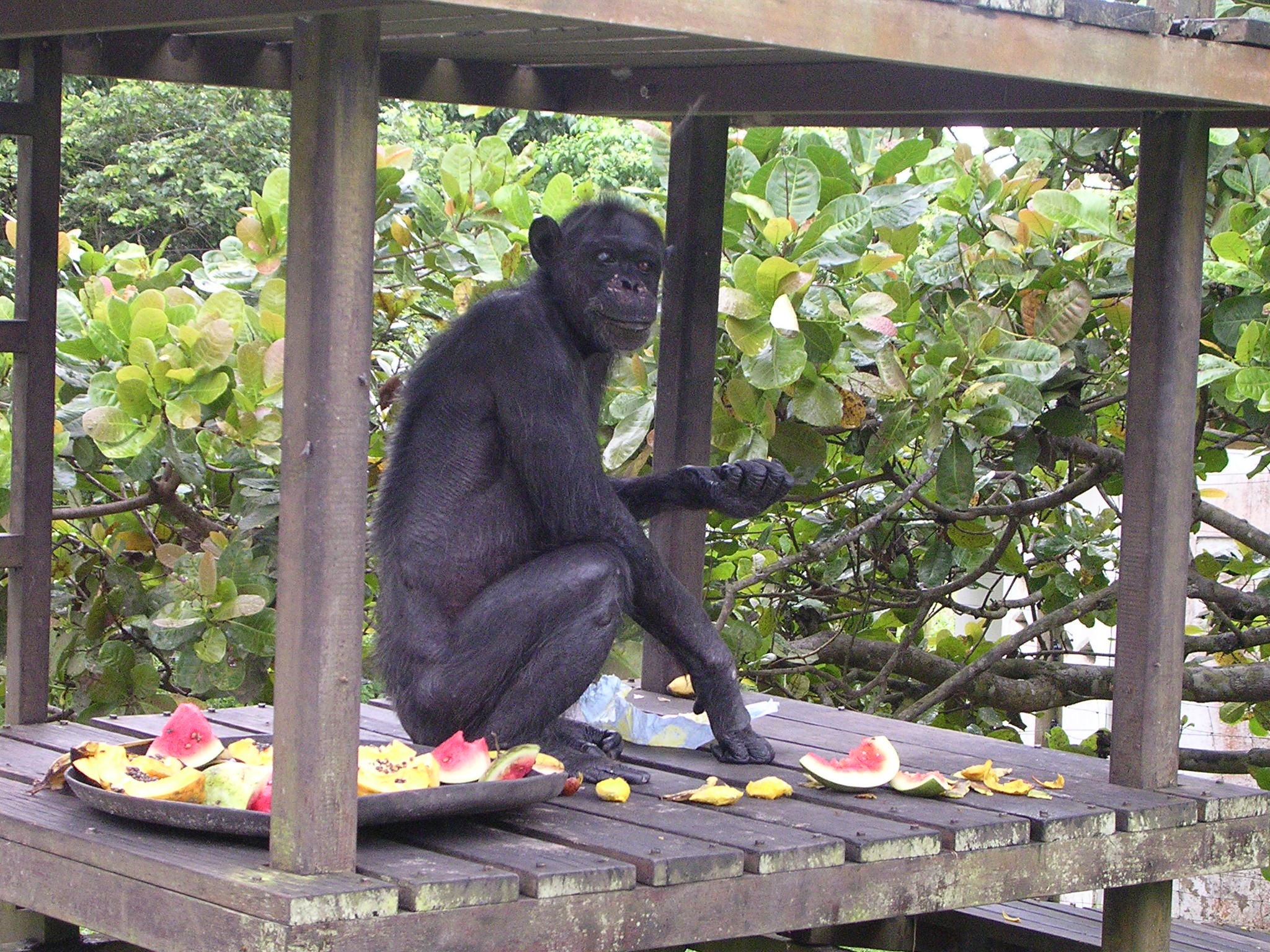
Gregoire: 62-year-old chimpanzee

Chimpanzees, as well as other apes, had also been purported to have been known to ancient writers, but mainly as myths and legends on the edge of European and Near Eastern societal consciousness. Apes are mentioned variously by Aristotle. The English word ape translates Hebrew קוף (qof) in English translations of the Bible (1 Kings 10:22), but the word may refer to a monkey rather than an ape proper.

The first of these early transcontinental chimpanzees came from Angola and were presented as a gift to Frederick Henry, Prince of Orange in 1640, and were followed by a few of its brethren over the next several years. Scientists described these first chimpanzees as "pygmies", and noted the animals' distinct similarities to humans. The next two decades, a number of the creatures were imported into Europe, mainly acquired by various zoological gardens as entertainment for visitors.

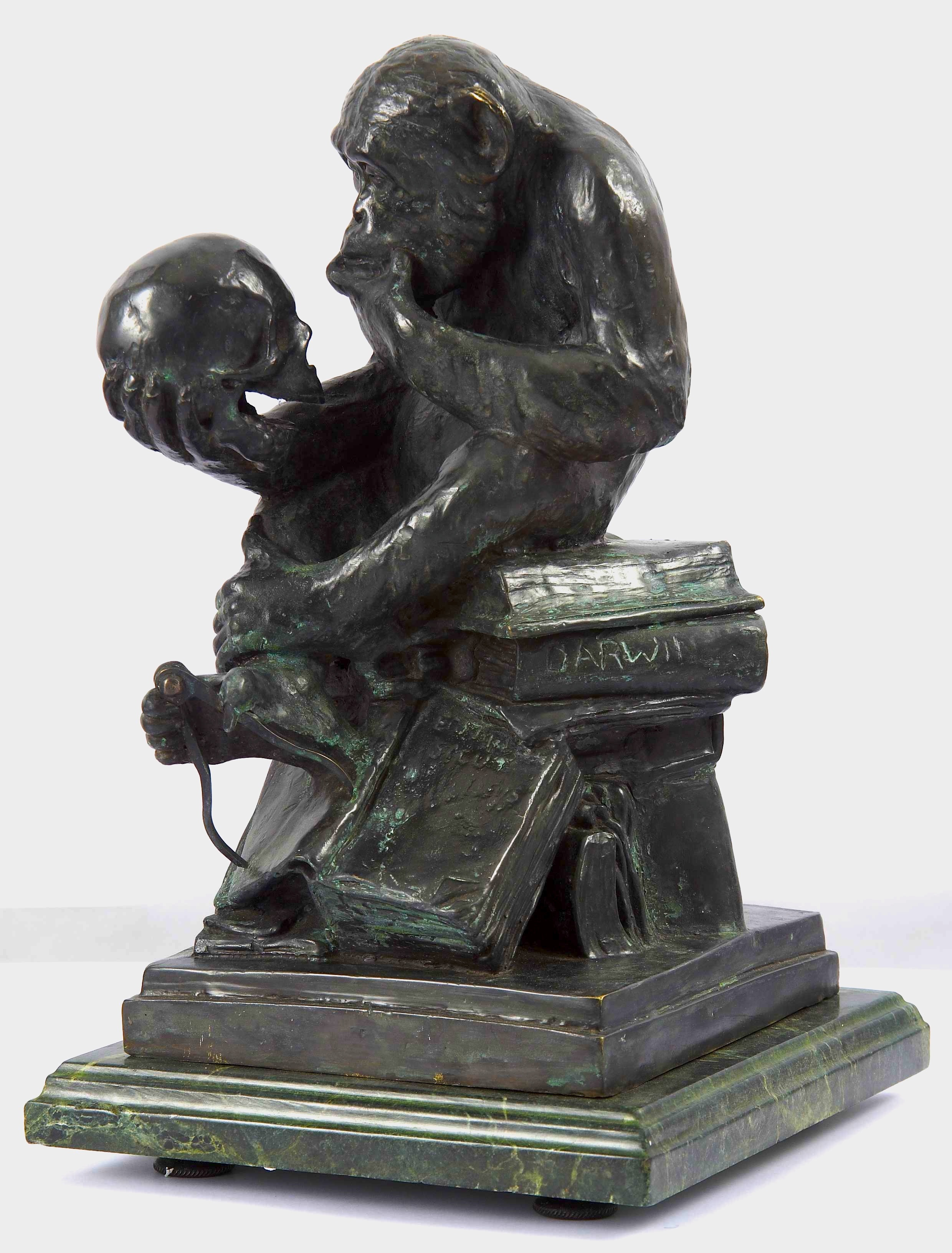
Hugo Rheinhold's c. 1893 Affe mit Schädel ("Ape with skull").

Charles Darwin's theory of natural selection (published in 1859) spurred scientific interest in chimpanzees, as in much of life science, leading eventually to numerous studies of the animals in the wild and captivity. The observers of chimpanzees at the time were mainly interested in behaviour as it related to that of humans. This was less strictly and disinterestedly scientific than it might sound, with much attention being focused on whether or not the animals had traits that could be considered 'good'; the intelligence of chimpanzees was often significantly exaggerated, as immortalized in Hugo Rheinhold's Affe mit Schädel (see image, left). By the end of the 19th century, chimpanzees remained very much a mystery to humans, with very little factual scientific information available.

In the 20th century, a new age of scientific research into chimpanzee behaviour began. Before 1960, almost nothing was known about chimpanzee behaviour in their natural habitats. In July of that year, Jane Goodall set out to Tanzania's Gombe forest to live among the chimpanzees, where she primarily studied the members of the Kasakela chimpanzee community. Her discovery that chimpanzees made and used tools was groundbreaking, as humans were previously believed to be the only species to do so. The most progressive early studies on chimpanzees were spearheaded primarily by Wolfgang Köhler and Robert Yerkes, both of whom were renowned psychologists. Both men and their colleagues established laboratory studies of chimpanzees focused specifically on learning about the intellectual abilities of chimpanzees, particularly problem-solving. This typically involved basic, practical tests on laboratory chimpanzees, which required a fairly high intellectual capacity (such as how to solve the problem of acquiring an out-of-reach banana). Notably, Yerkes also made extensive observations of chimpanzees in the wild which added tremendously to the scientific understanding of chimpanzees and their behaviour. Yerkes studied chimpanzees until World War II, while Köhler concluded five years of study and published his famous Mentality of Apes in 1925 (which is coincidentally when Yerkes began his analyses), eventually concluding, "chimpanzees manifest intelligent behaviour of the general kind familiar in human beings ... a type of behaviour which counts as specifically human" (1925).

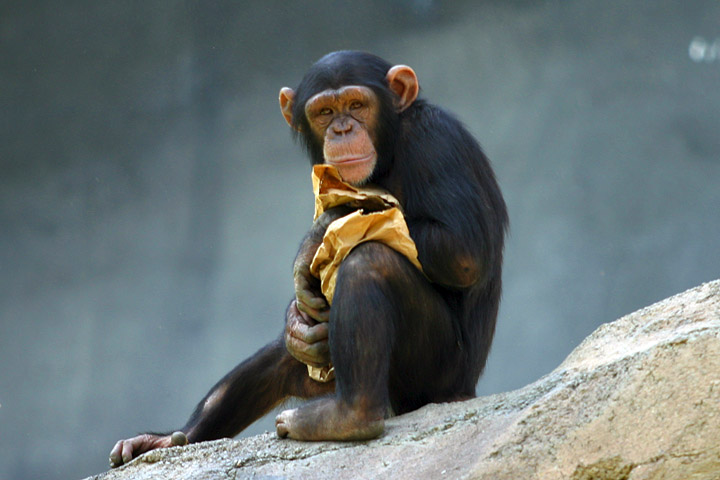
Chimpanzee at the Los Angeles Zoo

The August 2008 issue of the American Journal of Primatology reported results of a year-long study of chimpanzees in Tanzania's Mahale Mountains National Park, which produced evidence of chimpanzees becoming sick from viral infectious diseases they had likely contracted from humans. Molecular, microscopic and epidemiological investigations demonstrated the chimpanzees living at Mahale Mountains National Park have been suffering from a respiratory disease that is likely caused by a variant of a human paramyxovirus.

== Conservation ==
The US Fish and Wildlife Service finalized a rule on June 12, 2015, creating very strict regulations, practically barring any activity with chimpanzees other than for scientific, preservation-oriented purposes.

== See also ==
- Anthropopithecus
- Bili ape
- Chimp Haven
- Chimpanzee genome project
- Dian Fossey
- Great ape personhood
- Jane Goodall
- List of apes
- Monkey Day
- Prostitution among animals#Chimpanzees
- The Third Chimpanzee

== Sources ==
- Kingdon, Jonathan (2015). The Kingdon Field Guide to African Mammals (Second ed.). Bloomsbury Publishing. ISBN 978-1-4729-2531-2.
