= Great Ape Project =

International organization

- Founded: 1993
- Founder: Peter Singer and Paola Cavalieri
- Purpose: Animal rights
- Website: www.projetogap.org/en/

The Great Ape Project (GAP), founded in 1993, is an international organization of primatologists, anthropologists, ethicists, and others who advocate a United Nations Declaration of the Rights of Great Apes that would confer basic legal rights on non-human great apes: bonobos, chimpanzees, gorillas and orangutans.

The rights suggested are the right to life, the protection of individual liberty, and the prohibition of torture. The organization also monitors individual great ape activity in the United States through a census program. Once rights are established, GAP would demand the release of great apes from captivity; currently 3,100 are held in the U.S., including 1,280 in biomedical research facilities.

== The Great Ape Project (book) ==
The 1994 book The Great Ape Project: Equality Beyond Humanity, edited by philosophers Paola Cavalieri and Peter Singer, features contributions from thirty-four authors, including Jane Goodall and Richard Dawkins, who have submitted articles voicing their support for the project. The authors write that human beings are intelligent animals with a varied social, emotional, and cognitive life. If great apes also display such attributes, the authors argue, they deserve the same consideration humans extend to members of their own species.

The book highlights findings that support the capacity of great apes to possess rationality and self-consciousness, and the ability to be aware of themselves as distinct entities with a past and future. Documented conversations (in sign languages) with individual great apes are the basis for these findings. Other subjects addressed within the book include the division placed between humans and great apes, great apes as persons, progress in gaining rights for the severely intellectually disabled (once an overlooked minority), and the situation of great apes in the world today.

== World Declaration on Great Apes ==
The Great Ape Project is campaigning to have the United Nations endorse a World Declaration on Great Apes. This would extend what the project calls the "community of equals" to include chimpanzees, gorillas and orangutans. The declaration seeks to extend to non-human great apes the protection of three basic interests: the right to life, the protection of individual liberty, and the prohibition of torture.

=== Right to life ===
The declaration states that members of the community of equals, which includes humans, have an essential right to life and may not be killed except in certain strictly defined circumstances such as self-defense.

=== Protection of individual liberty ===
The declaration states that members of the community of equals are not to be deprived of their liberty, and are entitled to immediate release where there has been no form of due process. Under the proposed declaration, the detention of great apes who have not been convicted of any crime or who are not criminally liable should be permitted only where it can be shown that the detention is in their own interests or is necessary to protect the public. The declaration says there must be a right of appeal, either directly or through an advocate, to a judicial tribunal.

=== Prohibition of torture ===
The declaration prohibits the torture, defined as the deliberate infliction of severe pain, on any great ape, whether wantonly or because of a perceived benefit to others. Under International Human Rights Law this is a jus cogens principle and under all major human rights documents it cannot at any time be derogated by any State.

== Opposition ==
=== Humanist opposition ===
Professor Colin Blakemore, head of the Medical Research Council in the United Kingdom from 2003–2007, is opposed to granting rights to non-human apes, stating "I can see no current necessity for the use of great apes, and I'm pleased that they're not being used and that every effort is being made to reduce the use of other primates. But I worry about the principle of where the moral boundaries lie. There is only one very secure definition that can be made, and that is between our species and others." Blakemore suggests that it would be necessary to perform research on great apes if humans were threatened by a pandemic virus that afflicted only humans and other great apes. The British Union for the Abolition of Vivisection described Blakemore's stance as "backward-looking".

=== Sentiencism opposition ===
Professor Gary Francione criticized the philosophical basis of the project, that he calls "similar minds". For him, it is wrong to link the moral status of nonhumans to their possession of humanlike cognitive characteristics, as no characteristic other than sentience is required for personhood.

== Recent developments ==
=== United States ===
A study commissioned by the National Institute of Health (NIH) and conducted by the Institute of Medicine (IOM) concluded in a report (see report brief) released on 15 December 2011 that "while the chimpanzee has been a valuable animal model in past research, most current use of chimpanzees for biomedical research is unnecessary". The primary recommendation is that the use of chimpanzees in research be guided by a set of principles and criteria, in effect to greatly limit government-funded research using chimpanzees. Falling short of calling for the out-right ban of using chimpanzees for research, the report acknowledged that new emerging, or re-emerging diseases may require the use of chimpanzees, echoing Professor Colin Blakemore's concern.

Francis Collins, Director of NIH announced on the same day the report was released that he accepted the recommendations and will develop the implementation plan which includes the forming of an expert committee to review all submitted grant applications and projects already underway involving the use of chimpanzees. Furthermore, no new grant applications using chimpanzees will be reviewed until further notice.

On 21 September 2012, NIH announced that 110 chimpanzees owned by the government will be retired. NIH owns about 500 chimpanzees for research, this move signifies the first step to wind down NIH's investment in chimpanzee research, according to Francis Collins. Currently housed at the New Iberia Research Center in Louisiana, 10 of the retired chimpanzees will go to the chimpanzee sanctuary Chimp Haven while the rest will go to Texas Biomedical Research Institute in San Antonio. However concerns over the chimpanzee's status in the Texas Biomedical Research Institute as "research ineligible" rather than "retired" prompted NIH to reconsider the plan and it announced on 17 October 2012 that as many chimpanzees as possible will be relocated to Chimp Haven by August 2013 and eventually all 110 will move there.

On 22 January 2013, a NIH task force released a report calling for the government to retire most of the chimpanzees the U.S. government support. The panel concluded that the animals provide little benefit in biomedical discoveries except in a few disease cases which can be supported by a small population of 50 primates for future research. Other approaches such as genetically altered mice should be developed and refined.

On 13 November 2013, the U.S. House of Representatives and the U.S. Senate passed The Chimpanzee Health Improvement, Maintenance and Protection Act, approving the funding to expand the capacity of Chimp Haven and other chimpanzee sanctuaries, thus allowing the transfer of almost all of the apes owned by the federal government to live in a more natural and group environment than in the laboratory. The transfer is expected to take five years when all but 50 chimpanzees, which will remain with the NIH, will be "retired".

=== Other countries ===
The Great Ape Project achieved many of its goals in its early years: New Zealand completely banned invasive experiments on great apes in 1999, as did the Balearic Islands (an autonomous region of the monarchy of Spain) in 2007, deciding to implement certain fundamental rights for great apes in their code of law. However, the project entered a long period of political stagnation in Europe. All hopes that the achievements on the Balearic Islands would spark off further steps on the mainland of Spain and from there to other European countries proved to be futile. Efforts in Spain were largely curtailed due to the influence of the Catholic Church, obstructing the project's goals.

In 2011, the project was given a "relaunch" in Germany, supported by the Giordano-Bruno-Stiftung. In 2014, a petition to the German Bundestag was started, requesting the implementation of fundamental rights for great apes into the German constitution (specifically the rights to personal freedom, life and protection from bodily harm). The Bundestag rejected the petition in 2015.

== See also ==
- Great ape language
- Great ape personhood
- Great ape research ban
- Great Ape Trust
- Great Apes Survival Partnership
- International primate trade
- Kinshasa Declaration on Great Apes
- Non-human primate experiments
