= World Wildlife Day =

UN observed day to highlight Convention of Endangered Species of Fauna and Flora

- World Wildlife Day logo
- Also called: Wildlife Day / WWD
- Observed by: All UN Member States
- Celebrations: To celebrate and raise awareness of the world's wild fauna and flora
- Date: 3 March
- Next time: 3 March 2027
- Frequency: Annual

World Wildlife Day is an international day held annually on 3 March to raise awareness about wild animals and plants and their importance in the environment. It was declared by the United Nations General Assembly on 20 December 2013; the date commemorates the 1973 signing of the Convention on International Trade in Endangered Species of Wild Fauna and Flora (CITES).

== UNGA Resolution ==
In its resolution, proposed by Thailand, the General Assembly reaffirmed the intrinsic value of wildlife and its various contributions, including ecological, genetic, social, economic, scientific, educational, cultural, recreational and aesthetic, to sustainable development and human well-being.

The General Assembly took note of the outcome of the 16th meeting of the Conference of the Parties to CITES, held in Bangkok from 3 to 14 March 2013, in particular Resolution Conf. 16.1 designating 3 March as World Wildlife Day, in order to celebrate and raise awareness of the world’s wild fauna and flora, and recognized the important role of CITES in ensuring that international trade does not threaten the survival of species.

The General Assembly requested the CITES Secretariat, in collaboration with relevant organizations of the United Nations system, to facilitate the implementation of World Wildlife Day.

== Themes ==
2025: "Wildlife Conservation Finance: Investing in People and Planet"

2023: "Partnerships for Wildlife Conservation"

2022: "Recovering key species for ecosystem restoration"

2021: "Forests and Livelihoods: sustaining people and planet"

2020: "Sustaining all life on earth"

2019: "Life below water: for people and planet"

2018: "Big cats - predators under threat"

2017: "Listen to the young voices"

2016: "The future of wildlife is in our hands", with a sub-theme "The future of elephants is in our hands"

2015: "It’s time to get serious about wildlife crime"

== See also ==
- International Primate Day
- Monkey Day
- World Animal Day
