= Kinshasa Declaration on Great Apes =

2005 statement

The Kinshasa Declaration on Great Apes was a high-level political statement on the future of (non-human) great apes. It was signed during the Intergovernmental Meeting on Great Apes and the first council meeting of the Great Apes Survival Partnership (GRASP) in Kinshasa, Democratic Republic of the Congo on September 9, 2005. By signing this declaration, more than 70 representatives—including 18 range states, six donor countries, 25 non-governmental organization partners, two Multilateral Environmental Agreement partnerships, and two intergovernmental organizations—affirmed a commitment to protect great apes.

== Detailed statements ==
Representatives agreed to protect apes through:

- affirming their commitment to the GRASP Global Strategy and to support, and for the range states, implement, effective measures to counter the threats facing the great apes;
- emphasizing the need to stimulate and enhance range state cooperation to ensure the effective enforcement of great ape legislation and coordinated efforts to halt activities that have a detrimental effect on great ape populations;
- emphasizing the role of national and international measures and participation in regional initiatives, and encourage ratification and compliance with international treaties such as the biodiversity and conservation-related Multilateral Environmental Agreements (MEAs);
- urging development and implementation of National Great Ape Survival Plans (NGASPs) by the range states;
- urging GRASP Partners and others to support range states in the implementation of their NGASPs;
- encouraging the provision of long-term ecologically sustainable economic benefits to local communities;
- inviting international institutions and agencies to prioritize policies promoting ecologically sustainable livelihoods for local and indigenous communities which prevent activities detrimental to the survival of the great apes;
- reaffirming their commitment to ensure GRASP has the capacity to realize its full potential;
- resolving to set the target of securing a constant and significant reduction in the current loss of great ape populations by 2010 and to secure the future of all species and subspecies of great apes in the wild by 2015; and
- inviting the international community to provide effective and coherent support, including funding, to assist efforts made by the great ape range states.

== See also ==
- Great Ape Project
