= Affe mit Schädel =

Sculpture by Hugo Rheinhold

Affe mit Schädel (Ape with Skull)
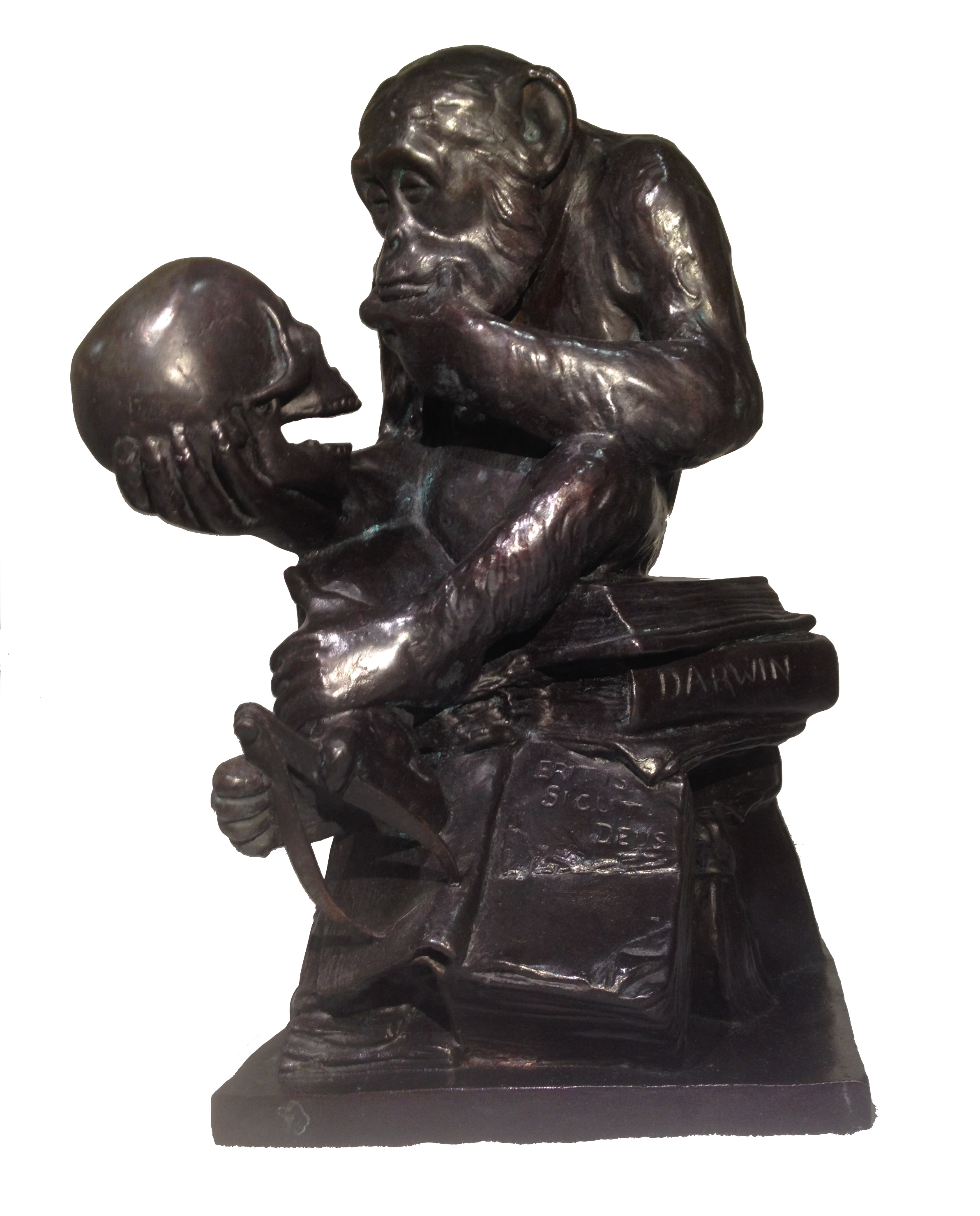
- Artist: Hugo Rheinhold
- Year: c. 1893
- Type: Bronze
- Dimensions: 30 cm (12 in)

The Affe mit Schädel ("Ape with skull") is a famous work by the late-19th-century German sculptor Hugo Rheinhold. The statuette is otherwise known as the Affe, einen Schädel betrachtend ("Monkey viewing or contemplating a skull"). It was first exhibited in 1893 at the Große Berliner Kunstaustellung (Great Berlin Art Exhibition).

== Description ==
A common chimpanzee (Pan troglodytes) is sitting atop a pile of books and manuscripts. The subject is holding in its right hand a human skull, echoing the scene in Shakespeare's Hamlet where the Prince of Denmark mourns Yorick ("Alas, poor Yorick! I knew him…"). The chimpanzee cradles its chin with a hand in a contemplative posture. Sitting with its left leg supporting the right, the right leg holds the calipers in its foot. A spine of one of the closed books reads "Darwin".

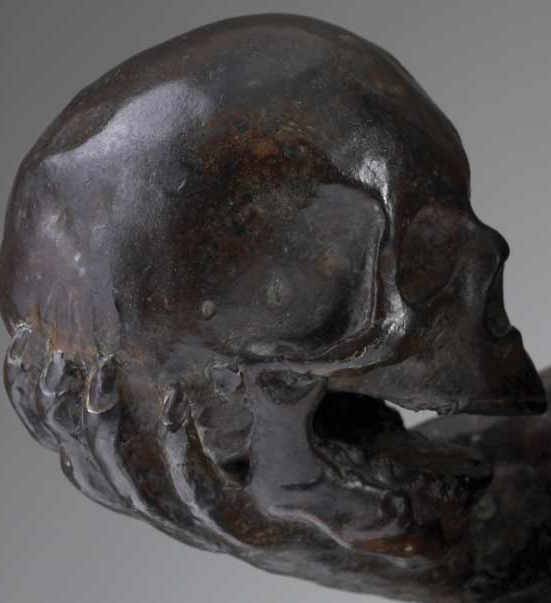
Detail showing human skull

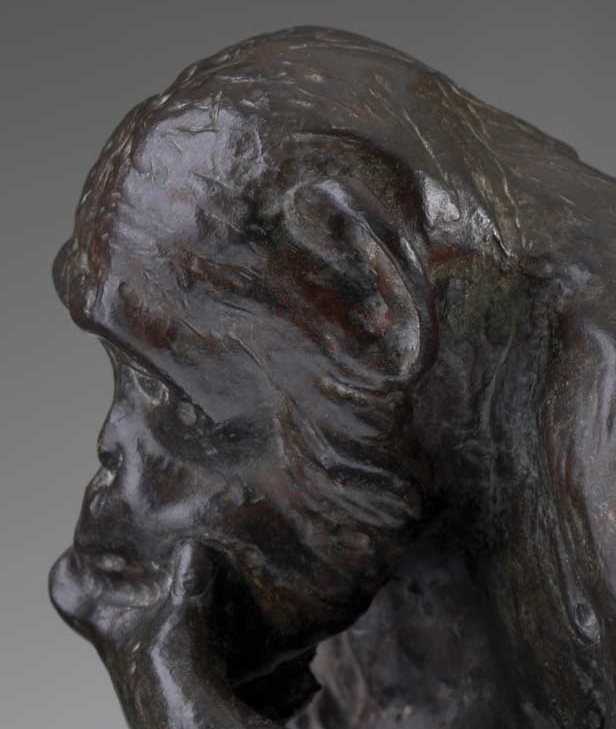
Detail showing contemplative posture

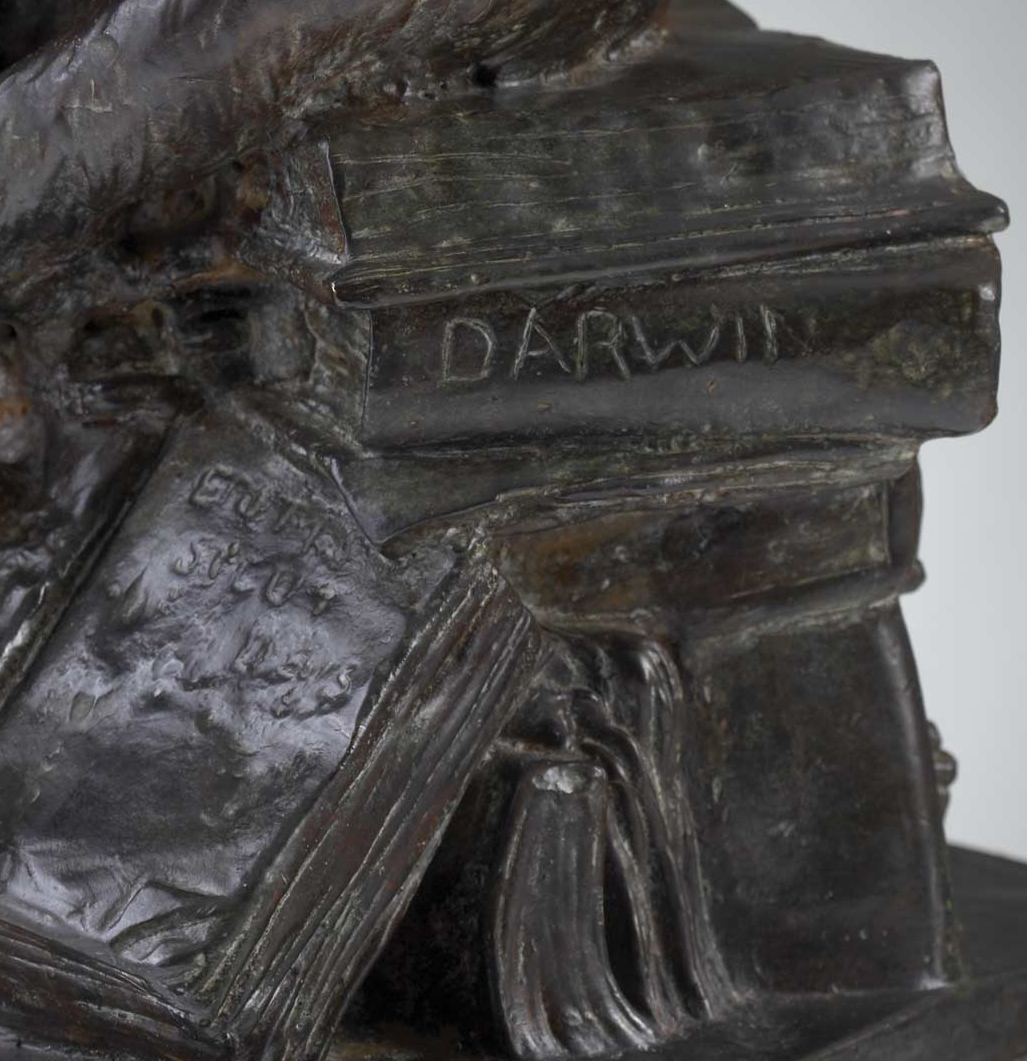
Detail showing pile of books and "Darwin" spine

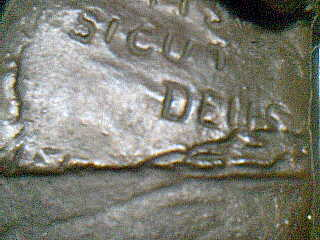
Detail showing rip to Bible page

The book open at the feet and facing the viewer has a single inscription on the right hand page: "eritis sicut deus" from Genesis 3.5 when the serpent is enticing Eve to eat of the Tree of Knowledge of Good and Evil in the Garden of Eden against the Lord's command, promising "And ye shall be as God [knowing good and evil]"), however the second half of this quote is missing, ripped from the lower half of the page.

== Motivation ==
What inspired Rheinhold in making his sculpture is unknown, although it has obvious parallels with Auguste Rodin’s The Thinker. It is perhaps surprising to discover that while Rodin had developed his statue as early as 1880, it was not cast into bronze and displayed until after the Affe mit Schädel had debuted.

== Interpretation ==
The excised Biblical quote possibly suggests good and evil cannot be known, or told apart. With the ape's study, the library of books and the caliper instruments, the suggestion is the statue is a warning against the application of rationalism in the absence of morality. Furthermore, when a human is depicted holding a skull, it is usually a comment on mortality (see memento mori) and the inevitability of death; famously, Hamlet bereaves Yorick in one instance, but is soon repulsed by this macabre souvenir as it brings him face-to-face with all life's grim destiny. But, for Hugo Rheinhold's ape, it is something quite different. The ape is engaged in assessment and measurement (confirmed by the calipers). That we should even consider this level of intelligence in another species is a bold examination of ourselves through eyes that bear witness to the disproportionate leverage historically awarded humankind. Hugo Rheinhold's original inscription "eritis sicut deus" (sometimes wrongly "eritus …."), either suggests Darwinian understanding may lead to Frankenstinian abuse of life's essence, or a more inclusive innocence that recognises a place for other advanced life‑forms on our intellectual podium, if only we can just accommodate those guests. The page on which the Book of Genensis quote eritis sicut deus (“You will be like God”) is written is torn with the second part Scientes bonum et malum ("knowing good from evil") lost. Hugo was sympathetic to Darwinian ideas but familiar with Goethe's Faust, where the same quote appears with a warning on the misuse of man's power of reason, the calipers being symbolic of the scientific method.

== Reproduction ==
While debuting at the Große Berliner Kunstaustellung, the Affe mit Schädel became noticed by the Gladenbeck foundry (set up by Carl Gustav Hermann Gladenbeck in 1851). Purchasing the rights to the statue, the foundry featured it as a bronze in their catalogue, and it became popular through its quirky originality. The 30 cm full-size moulds disappeared with the closure of the Gladenbeck foundry, but Bildgießerei Seiler GmbH obtained the 13 cm Gladenbeck casting mould (Nr. 1194).

== Distribution ==
Gladenbeck editions of the statue are displayed at the Institute of Evolutionary Biology, University of Edinburgh, Aberdeen’s Medico-Chirurgical Society, the Boston Medical Library and the Medical Library of Queen’s University in Kingston, Ontario, and also in Calgary, Cottbus, Gloucester, Kerikeri, Munnekeburen, Oakville, Osaka, Oxford, Salem am Bodensee, Stevens Point, Vienna, and famously on Lenin’s desk in the Kremlin. One was even salvaged from a World War II Junkers Ju 88 at the bottom of Lake Attersee (Austria).

== Variations ==
Two foundries (Seiler in Germany, Powderhall in Scotland) still produce faithfully accurate editions of the statue. These editions differ in size (13cm and 30cm, respectively) and patinas (a light traditional bronze, and a much darker penny bronze, respectively). Other versions less faithful to the original mutate the chimp's pensive contemplation to head‑scratching bewilderment, or sacrifice metallic lustre by substitution of cheaper materials (e.g., clay), and often undermine the sculpture's poise with careless positioning of a plastic skull. Prices currently range from $10 to $4,500. When they do rarely surface in auction or through private sale, Gladenbeck pieces can fetch up to $6,000.

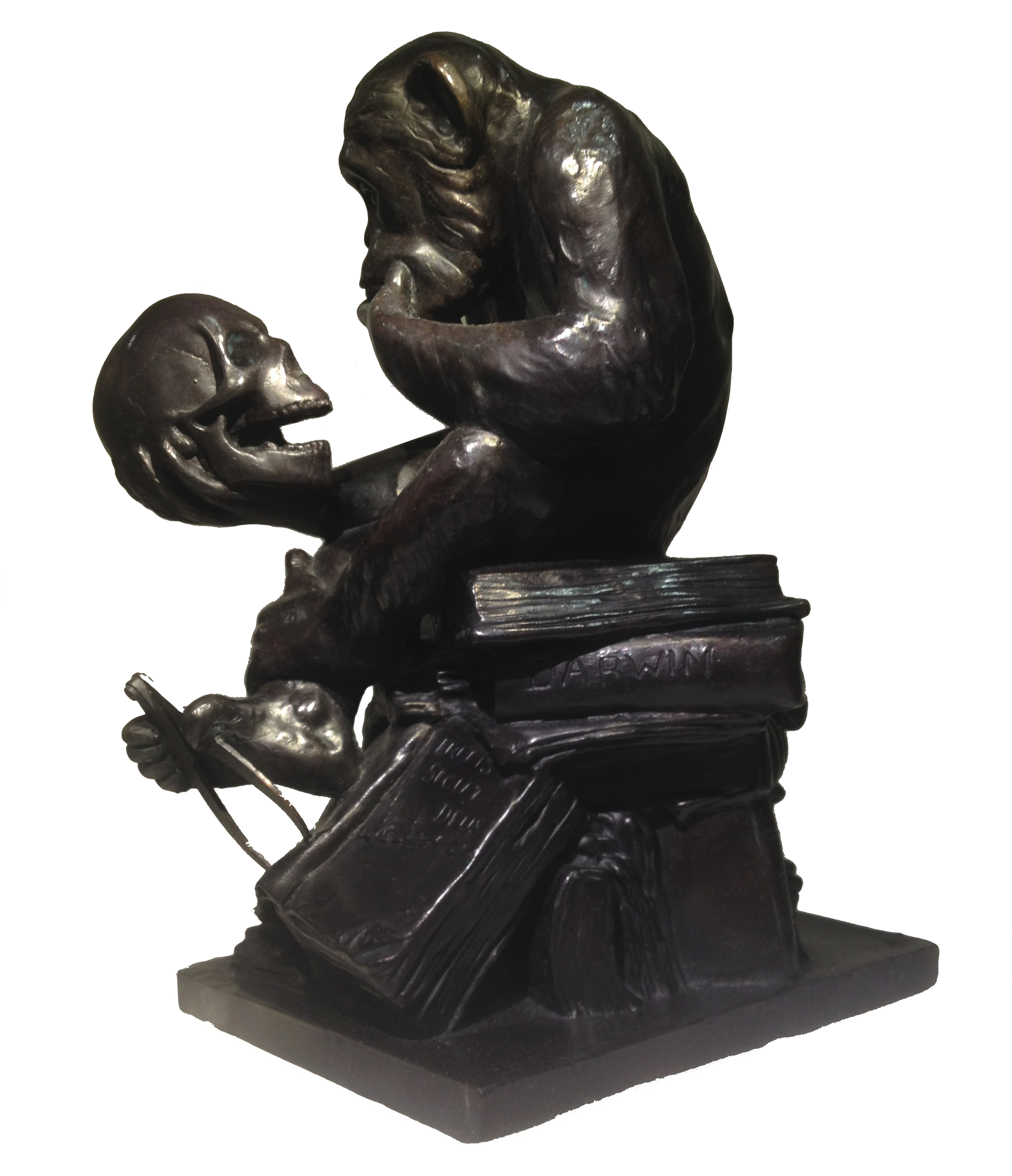
Affe mit Schädel
2014
patina: Penny Bronze

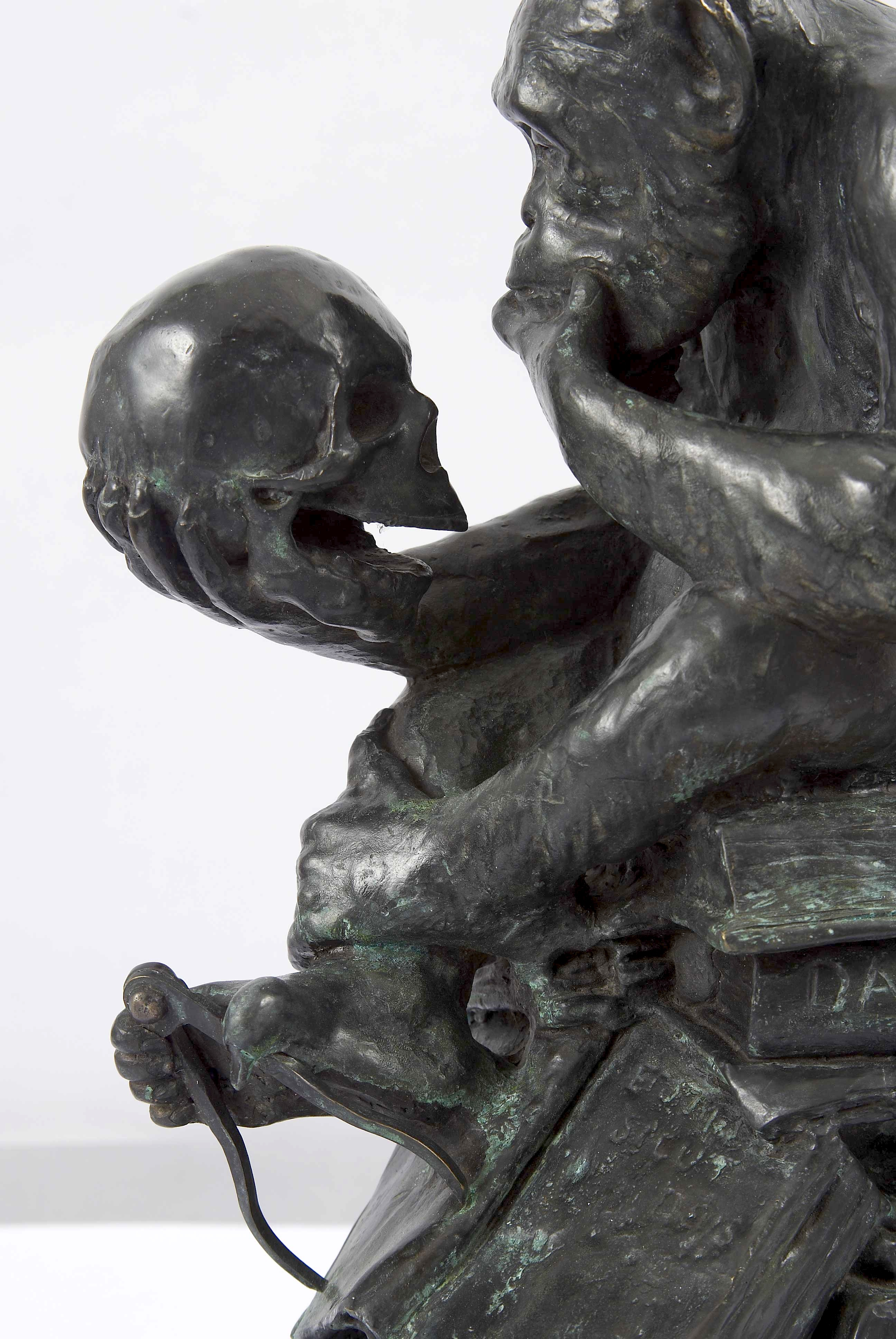
The Darwin Monkey
2008
patina: Gunmetal

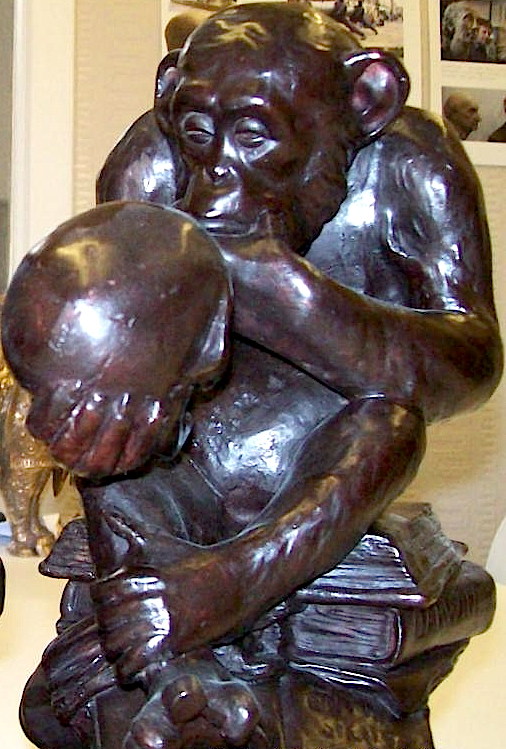
Powder Hall Bronze
2008
patina: Imperial Black

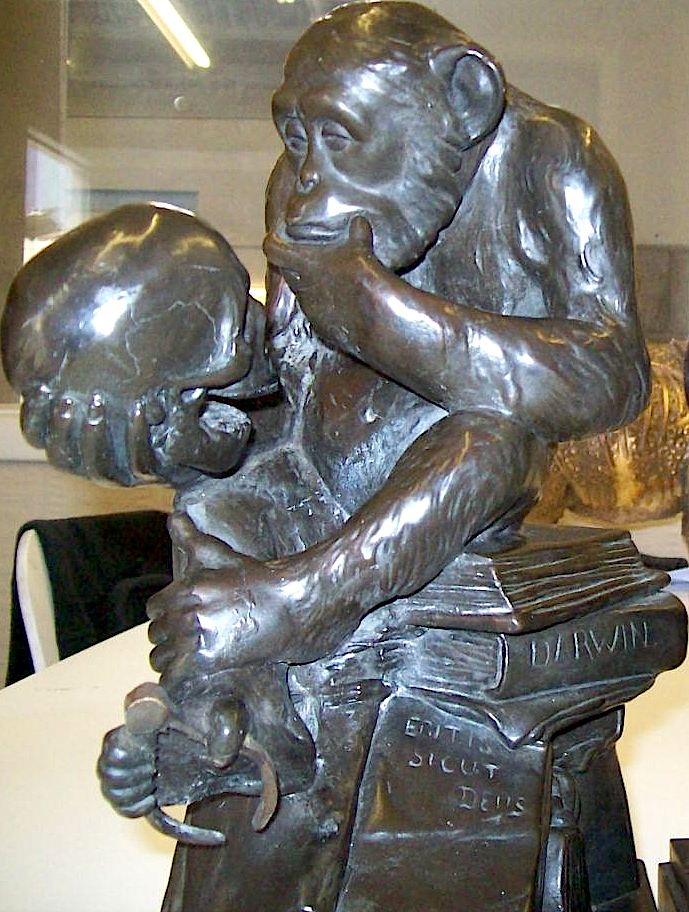
Thomas Blakemore
c. 1990
patina: Potash Black

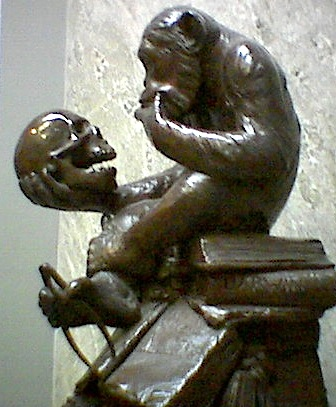
Gladenbeck
c. 1942
patina: Classic / antique
