= Hugo Rheinhold =

German sculptor

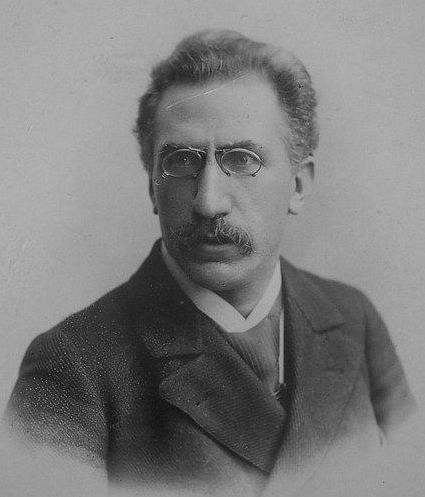
- Hugo Rheinhold
- Born: Wolfgang Hugo Rheinhold; 26 March 1853; Oberlahnstein, Prussia
- Died: 2 October 1900 (aged 47); Berlin, German Empire
- Education: Berlin Academy of Arts
- Known for: Sculpture
- Notable work: Affe mit Schädel, Am Wege, Ausverkauft, Barfüssige Marktfrau mit Weidenkorb, Lesende Mönche, Lesende Mönche, August Bebel
- Movement: Sculptural Impressionism

Wolfgang Hugo Rheinhold (26 March 1853 – 2 October 1900) was a German sculptor best known for his Affe mit Schädel ("Ape with Skull"). His surname is often misspelled "Reinhold".

== Life ==
Hugo Rheinhold was born in Oberlahnstein, Prussia, on March 26, 1853. He went to school in Koblenz before entering the merchant trade. When 21, Rheinhold sought success in the United States and became an import and export merchant, living in San Francisco (1874–1878), where he had the head office for his business, as well as in Hamburg, where he settled in 1879. The next year he married his childhood sweetheart Emma Levy from Cologne, sister of the banker Carl Levy; she was to die in 1882, after only one-and-a-half years of marriage. Emma's death had a huge impact Rheinhold. He sold his successful business and moved to Berlin to study science and philosophy at the Friedrich-Wilhelms University. In 1886, he studied under the sculptors Ernst Herter and Max Kruse, before officially enrolling as a student at the Berlin Academy of Arts (1888–1892). He died, aged 47, in Berlin.

== Works ==
Rheinhold produced a series of notable works within a very short career span. These include: a group of reading monks (Lesende Monche), a tribute to Alfred Nobel (Dynamite in the Service of Mankind), a bust of socialist leader August Bebel and his most famous piece Am Wege (1896) a marble of "an unfortunate young woman with a child at her breast". His biggest bronze work was for Dynamit Nobel AG, a statue titled Dynamite in the Service of Man, which included a tall goddess, possibly representing Athena, with a foot over a prostrate man. The statue was melted down for use in the Second World War for armaments.

Rheinhold was protective of his Jewish heritage, and was a strong influence in the Deutsch-Israelitischer Gemeindebund (an association of Jewish corporations). He sculpted Die Kämpfer ("The Warriors") in protest against burgeoning anti-Semitism. His last work, of serpentine deities in a fountain ("Brunnengrotte mit zwei Wassergottheiten"), was exhibited close to his death in 1900.

Today, Rheinhold is known for his Affe mit Schädel.

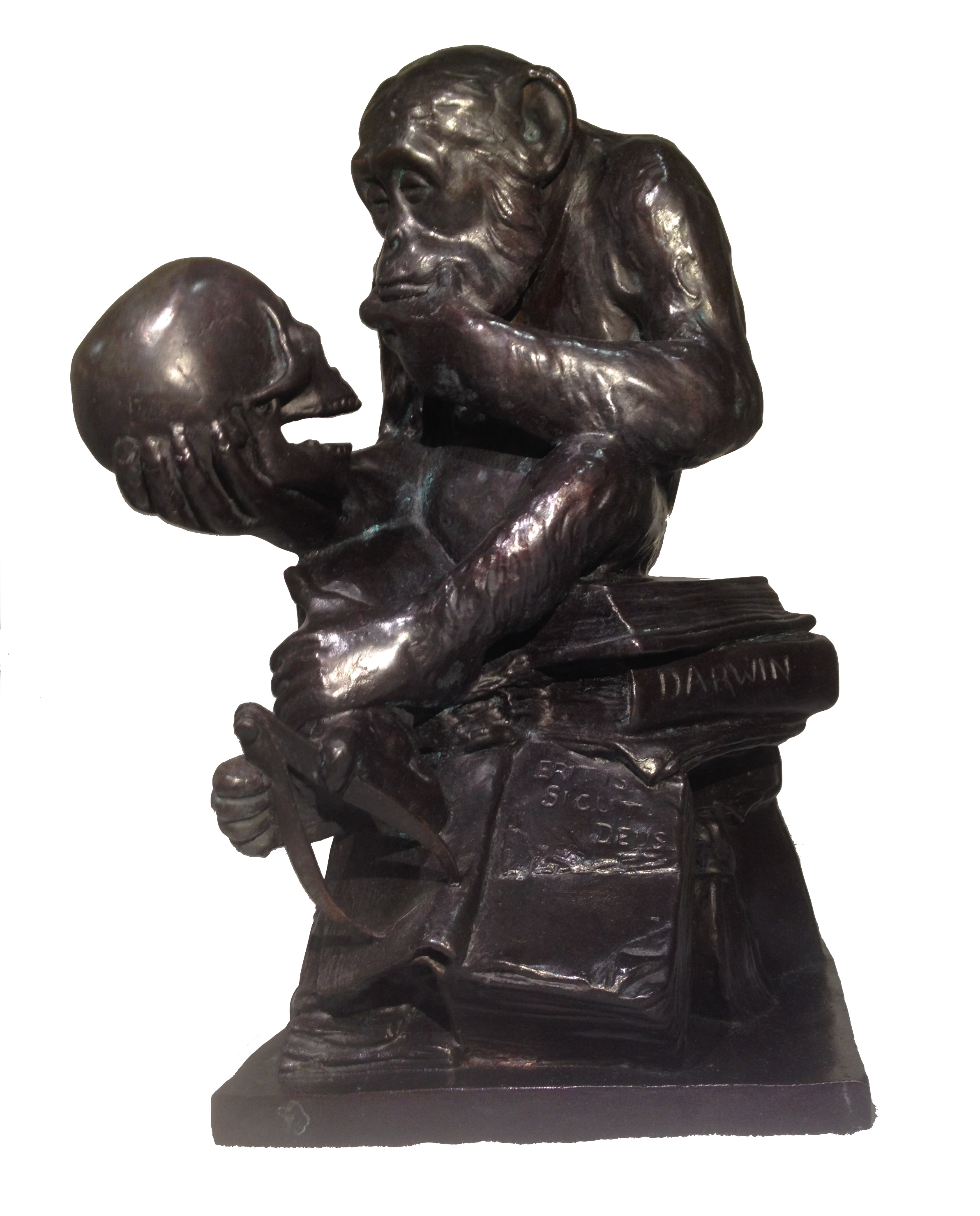
Affe mit Schädel
c. 1893

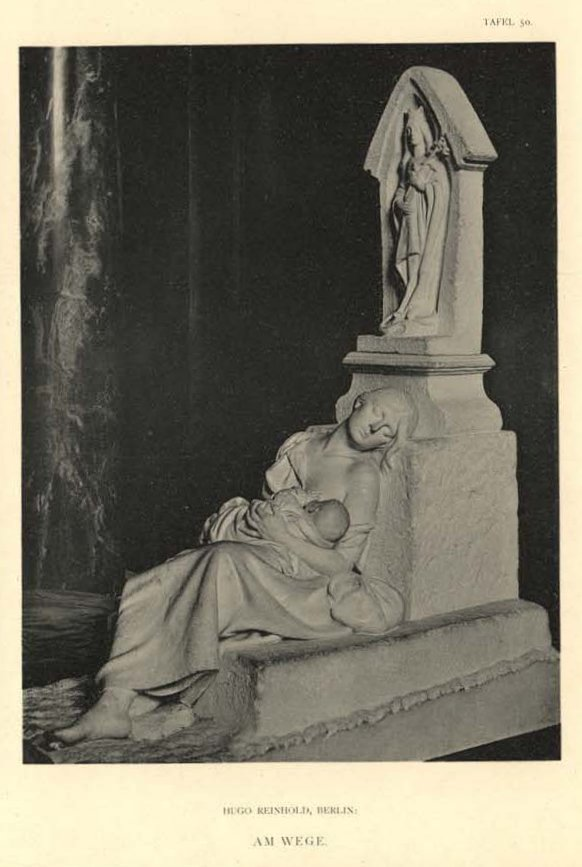
Am Wege
c. 1894

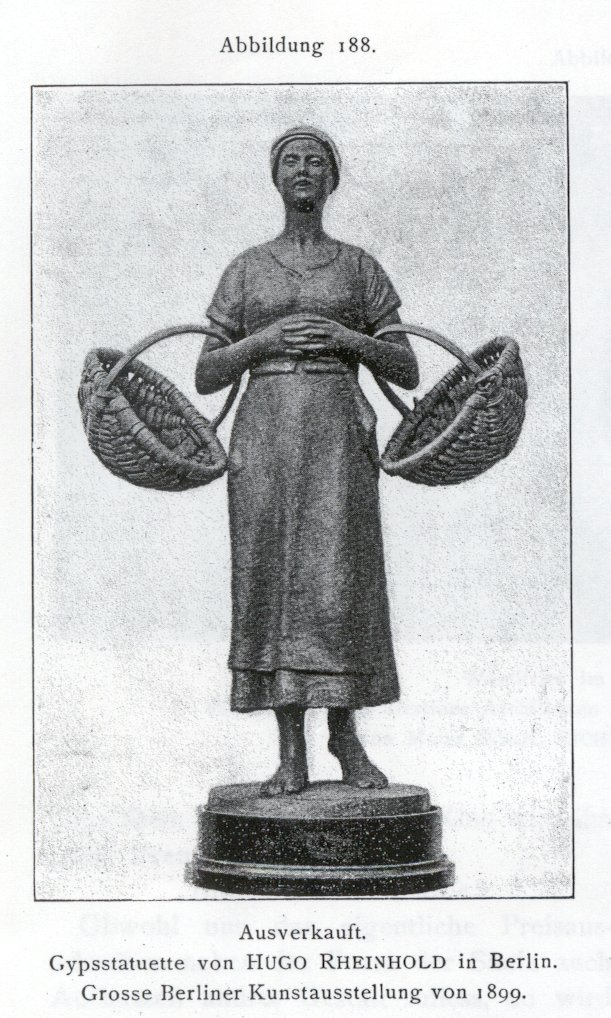
Ausverkauft
c. 1899

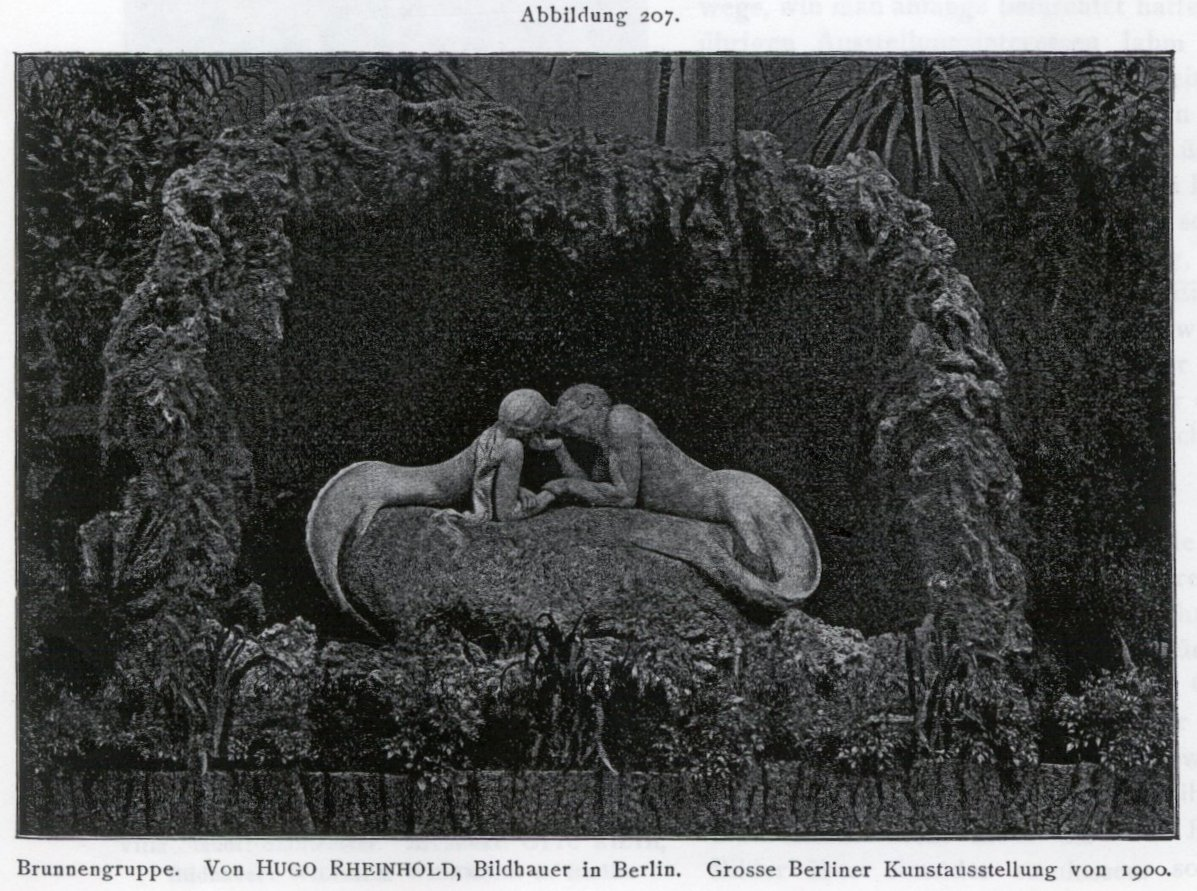
Brunnengruppe
c. 1900

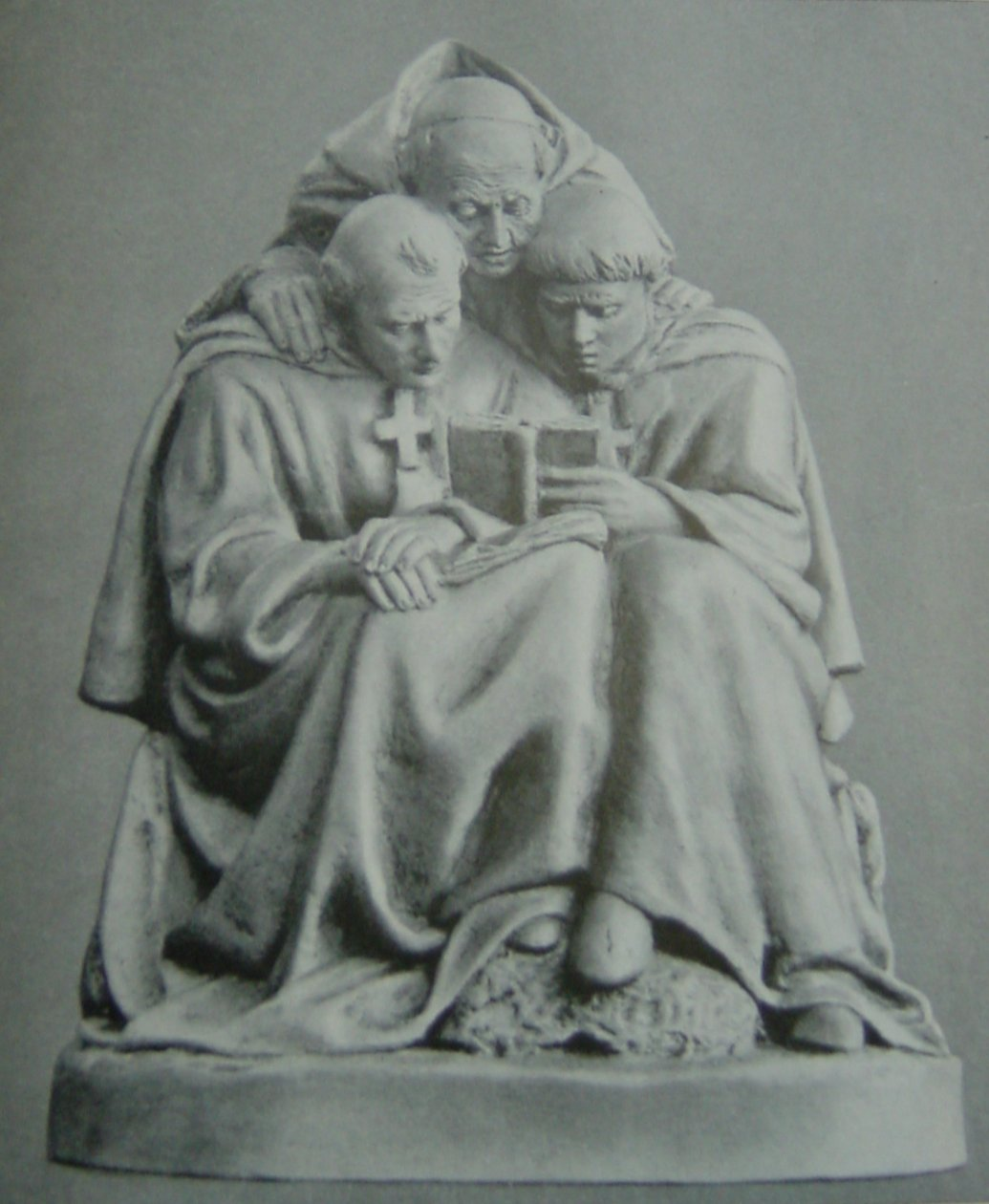
Lesende Mönche
c. 1900
