= University of Minnesota primate research =

The University of Minnesota runs a number of studies involving non-human primates, most notably research into drug addiction. The studies have attracted the attention of local and national animal rights groups, most especially the drug addiction studies of Marilyn Carroll, which she performs on primates, rats, and mice.

== Drug addiction ==
Non-human primates are used by the university to research the effects of drug addiction. The studies are led by Marilyn Carroll, a professor of psychiatry and neuroscience. As of October 2000, Carroll's laboratory was using 34 rhesus monkeys in these studies, according to a meeting of the university's Social Concerns Committee, a figure confirmed in a May 15, 2006 census obtained by the Minnesota Primate Freedom Project, a chapter of the national Primate Freedom Project. Carroll has received $8,888,593 in grants for her work from the National Institutes of Health (NIH) since 1996.

Carroll's research involves training monkeys and rats — for example by restricting food intake — to self-administer drugs that humans misuse. In the experiments, the animals drink alcohol, smoke, and are given cocaine, heroin, caffeine, nicotine, and alcohol intravenously (only rats self-administer intravenously). She writes that "several phases of the addiction process are modeled, such as acquisition, maintenance, withdrawal, craving, and relapse."

Her work has shown that antidepressants and behavioral or environmental changes, such as adding sweet-tasting drinking solutions, reduce the self-administration of drugs in laboratory animals. Other changes, such as limiting food intake, led to increased drug administration.

Carroll's work has also demonstrated that primates will become upset and mutilate themselves when forced to smoke cocaine; she notes in a publication: "Monkey M-V became very agitated and excitable when smoking cocaine. M-V’s state became more severe and incidents of self-mutilatory behavior occurred, specifically biting the upper leg area [...] One monkey showed considerable aggressive, self-mutilatory behavior during this time, throwing itself against the sides and top of its cage. As a result, it developed sinusitis and skin infections.

=== Animal rights protests (1986-Present) ===
Carroll's work on primates and other species has gained the attention of animal rights groups, including the Animal Liberation Front (ALF). Protests were first held outside her lab in 1986. Pictures of animal experiments were later sent to 400 of her neighbors, and her home was picketed. In 1997, Freeman Wicklund of the university's Student Organization for Animal Rights (SOAR) was sentenced to 90 days in jail after occupying the office of the president of the university to protest Carroll's research. Wicklund responded by beginning a hunger strike, which he told reporters would last until he was released; he was released two weeks later and given a year's probation instead. Carroll obtained a restraining order against SOAR, the ALF, and several of the protesters, including Wicklund. In 1998, Wicklund denounced the ALF, his previous activism, and made a proclamation of embracing pacifism; this move largely caused the campaign against Marilyn Carroll's research to deflate.

The city in which she lives (Mahtomedi, MN) has since passed an ordinance attempting to prevent activists from picketing at her home.

Along with these national groups, Carroll's work has been the continued focus of local groups via on-campus protests, banner hangs, and other methods of campus messaging. Organizations working on this issue include Progress for Science and the Animal Rights Coalition "No Pain in My Name" campaign.

== See also ==
- Rat Park
