= CHIMP Act Amendments of 2013 =

Proposed legislation

- Long title: To amend the Public Health Service Act to improve provisions relating to the sanctuary system for surplus chimpanzees.
- Announced in: the 113th United States Congress
- Sponsored by: Sen. Tom Harkin (D, IA)
- Number of co-sponsors: 1

Codification
- Acts affected: Public Health Service Act
- U.S.C. sections affected: 42 U.S.C. § 283m
- Agencies affected: United States Congress, Government Accountability Office, Department of Health and Human Services, National Institutes of Health

Legislative history
- Introduced in the Senate as S. 1561 by Sen. Tom Harkin (D, IA) on September 30, 2013; Committee consideration by United States Senate Committee on Health, Education, Labor, and Pensions, United States Senate Committee on Health, Education, Labor, and Pensions; Passed the Senate on October 30, 2013 (Unanimous consent)

The CHIMP Act Amendments of 2013 (S. 1561) is a bill that would modify the Public Health Service Act to allow the National Institutes of Health to spend a larger portion of their budget on funding the care of retired chimpanzees in chimp sanctuaries. The bill passed the Senate during the 113th United States Congress. Its title is a five-letter backronym that stands for "Chimpanzee Health Improvement, Maintenance, and Protection Act of 2013".

== Background ==
The National Institutes of Health (NIH), part of the federal government, makes use of Chimpanzees for medical research and testing. After these chimpanzees can no longer be used for research purposes, they are "retired" and sent to the Chimp Haven. Chimp Haven, the National Chimpanzee Sanctuary, is a species-specific facility designed to provide a home for chimpanzees that are retired from invasive biomedical research, the pet trade, and the entertainment industry. An existing law known as the Chimp Act places a cap of $30 million on the amount of money the NIH can spend on sanctuary care for their retired chimpanzees. Funding for continuing to house NIH-retired chimpanzees at Chimp Haven was expected to run out in mid-November 2013.

== Provisions of the bill ==
The CHIMP Act Amendments of 2013 would grant the NIH more budgetary flexibility so that they can retire additional chimpanzees to sanctuaries and continue to support the chimps already retired.

== Procedural history ==
=== Senate ===
The CHIMP Act Amendments of 2013 was introduced in the United States Senate on September 30, 2013 by Sen. Tom Harkin (D, IA). The bill was referred to the United States Senate Committee on Health, Education, Labor, and Pensions and the United States Senate Committee on Health, Education, Labor, and Pensions. On October 30, 2013, the Senate voted to pass the bill by unanimous consent.

== Debate and discussion ==
Supporters of the bill argue that it is necessary for moral reasons. Senator Harkin said that "we have an obligation to provide care for animals that have directly contributed to our medical knowledge." Supporters also argued that it would save the taxpayers money in comparison to the NIH continuing to care for the chimps they would prefer to retire. The bill had the support of the Humane Society of the United States.

== See also ==
- List of bills in the 113th United States Congress
- Chimp Haven
