= Great Apes Survival Partnership =

Great Apes Survival Partnership (GRASP)
- Formation: 2001
- Type: International conservation partnership
- Legal status: Active
- Headquarters: Nairobi, Kenya
- Region served: Africa and Southeast Asia
- Members: United Nations agencies, governments, NGOs, scientists, local communities, private sector
- Official language: English, French
- Coordinating agencies: UNEP and UNESCO
- Website: un-grasp.org

The Great Apes Survival Partnership (GRASP) is a UNEP and UNESCO-led World Summit on Sustainable Development (WSSD) Type II Partnership, established in 2001, which aims to conserve the non-human great apes (chimpanzees, bonobos, gorillas and orangutans) and their habitats—primarily forested tropical ecosystems that provide important services to humanity, through pro-poor conservation and sustainable development strategies.

== Background ==
GRASP involves all the principal institutional actors in great ape conservation—United Nations agencies, biodiversity-related multilateral environmental agreements, great ape range state and donor governments, non-governmental organizations, scientists, local communities and the private sector.

Non-human great apes are found in 21 countries in Africa and in two countries in South East Asia. Great ape populations are declining worldwide. The continuing destruction of habitat, in combination with the growth in the commercial bushmeat trade in Africa, have led scientists to suggest that the majority of great ape populations may be extinct in our lifetime. Even if isolated populations were to survive, the long-term viability of these great apes is in doubt due to their limited numbers and the fragmentation of their habitat.

The endangered great apes share their habitat with millions of humans, the majority of whom live below the poverty line. The need to link the welfare of humans and wildlife is a central objective of the GRASP Partnership.

International commitment to the great apes was reaffirmed at an Intergovernmental Meeting on great apes and the first GRASP Council Meeting held in the Democratic Republic of the Congo in September 2005, where the Kinshasa Declaration on Great Apes was adopted by more than 70 signatories.

== Threats to great apes ==
=== Habitat destruction ===
Almost all non-human primate populations are impacted by anthropogenic activities in the form of habitat destruction. The main contributors to habitat loss are farming, urbanization, deforestation, and climate change. Suitable environmental conditions for great apes have been on the decline and many populations are on the brink of extinction. The growth of habitat destruction shows no signs of stopping, potentially leading to mass extinctions of all great apes. The first ever continent-wide assessment of suitable environmental conditions (SEC) for great apes predicted a loss of 207,927 km^{2} from the years 1995–2010. Loss of predicted SEC appeared highest for Cross River gorillas (59%), followed by eastern gorillas (52%), western lowland gorillas (32%), bonobos (29%), central chimpanzees (17%) and western chimpanzees (11%).

=== Bushmeat ===
Bushmeat trade occurs all over tropical Africa, Asia and the Neotropics. Urbanization and improved technology provide greater access to remote areas, increasing the bushmeat trade market. Bushmeat has become an important factor of the economy. The majority of hunting in Central and West African villages is for cash rather than consumption. The industry is estimated to contribute US$24M – US$42M annually to the African economy. The hunting of apes and the sale of their meat for human consumption has been reported from many countries including Nigeria, Central African Republic, Congo-Brazzaville, Democratic Republic of Congo, Gabon, and Equatorial Guinea. It is estimated that 0.02 chimpanzees and 0.01 gorillas per square kilometre are hunted per year. This accounts for 5–7% of their populations directly lost due to the bushmeat trade.

=== Infectious diseases ===
An undermined threat to great ape populations is the transmission of pathogens from humans. There has been a total of 33 recorded occurrences of probably or confirmed pathogen transmission from humans to great apes between the years 1964–2012. The spread of infectious diseases poses a severe threat to already endangered great ape populations. Despite the severe risk of pathogen transmission, disease monitoring is only conducted for a small percentage of the world's great apes. This lack of monitoring is the greatest limiting factor in our ability to detect outbreaks and reduce the loss of great ape life.

== Conservation and poverty ==
Most countries involved in the Great Apes Survival partnership fall close or below the poverty line. Rather than viewing poverty and ape conservation as different issues, GRASP emphasizes the need to link the two together. People living in developing countries are often highly dependent on biodiversity to meet their livelihood needs. However, most threats faced by great apes are intensified by the poverty of people living in proximity. The reliance of poor, rural communities on forest resources may result in threats due to hunting practices that directly and indirectly target great apes for food or international trade; agricultural conversion or destructive gathering practices that directly degrade great ape habitats and by virtue of their vicinity, facilitate the transmission of human pathogens to the apes. To mitigate the threats poverty poses on ape populations, conservation approaches must involve all relevant stakeholders. This includes: industry, government, financial institutions, wildlife, ecosystems, local and indigenous communities.
