= Chimp Haven =

United States chimpanzee sanctuary

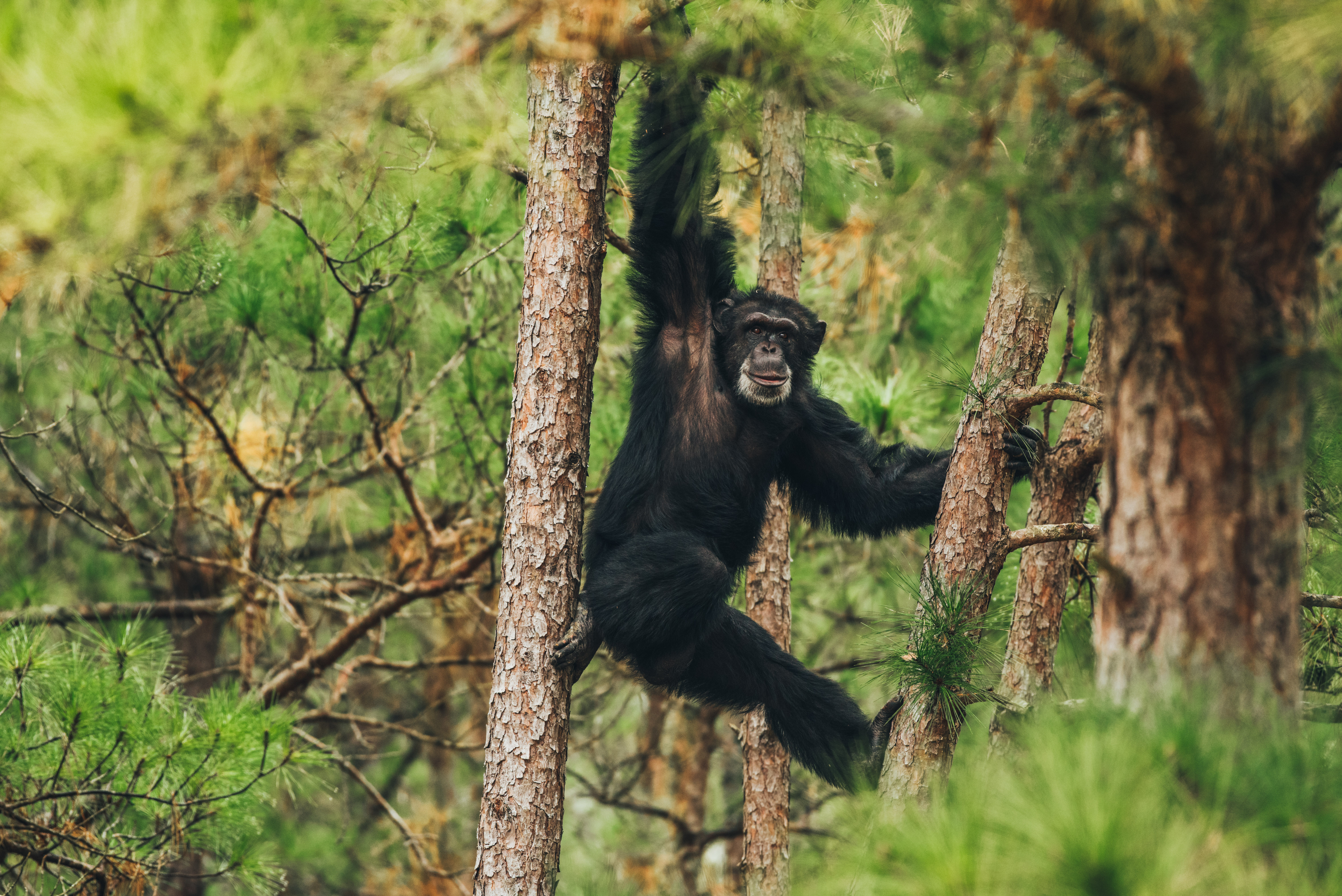
- Marcus at Chimp Haven
- Interactive map of Chimp Haven
- 32°15′16.76″N 93°56′12.00″W
- Date opened: 2005
- Location: Keithville, Louisiana, United States
- Land area: 200 acres (81 ha)
- No. of animals: More than 300
- Memberships: Association for the Assessment and Accreditation for Laboratory Animal Care, International and Global Federation of Animal Sanctuaries
- Website: chimphaven.org

Chimp Haven is a non-profit sanctuary for more than 300 chimpanzees retired from laboratory research. The 200-acre (81 ha) sanctuary is located in Eddie D. Jones Nature Park in Keithville, Louisiana, approximately 22 miles (35 km) southwest of Shreveport.

== History ==
In addition to their use as pets and entertainers, captive chimpanzees have served as subjects for scientific research. Anticipating that medical research on chimpanzees would be key to understanding diseases, such as AIDS and hepatitis, the United States government and private laboratories embarked on chimpanzee breeding programs in the 1980s. A decade later, the experimental use of chimpanzees declined, resulting in a surplus population of captive chimpanzees.

The significant cost of caring for the approximately 1,000 chimpanzees housed in U.S. research facilities required the development of alternatives to standard laboratory housing for chimpanzees no longer active in research. Concurrent with the plight of research chimpanzees, hundreds of privately owned chimpanzees who proved unmanageable to keep as pets or performers were also in need of a professionally run facility—a sanctuary.

While the government was recognizing the need for long-term care for chimpanzees, a philosophically diverse group of individuals representing the primatological, pharmaceutical, animal protection, zoo and business communities was already envisioning the creation of a model sanctuary for retired chimpanzees. The group incorporated as Chimp Haven, Inc. in 1995.

In 1999, Chimp Haven convened a facility design workshop with zoo designers, laboratory architects and field biologists to create a cost-effective sanctuary that would meet all the special needs of retired chimpanzees. In 2000, the Caddo Parish Commission in Northwest Louisiana donated 200 wooded acres of the Eddie D. Jones Nature Park to Chimp Haven to build the new facility.

In 2000, the United States Congress passed the Chimpanzee Health Improvement, Maintenance and Protection (CHIMP) Act. The CHIMP Act authorized the establishment of a sanctuary system for chimpanzees retired from medical research. Congress mandated that the National Institutes of Health implement the CHIMP Act. The Act stipulated that the government would pay 75 percent of the operating cost and 90 percent of the construction funds for the sanctuary system. The organization chosen to run the system would have to raise the remainder of the funding from private sources.

Chimp Haven submitted a competitive proposal to the National Institutes of Health to run the National Chimpanzee Sanctuary System and was awarded the contract in 2002. Construction began in 2003, and the first chimpanzees arrived at Chimp Haven in 2005.

== Description ==
The mission of Chimp Haven is: "To provide and promote the best care of sanctuary chimpanzees and inspire action for the species worldwide." Since 2005, more than 400 chimpanzees have found a home at Chimp Haven. As of 2021, Chimp Haven has more than 300 chimpanzees in residence.

To fulfill its mission of educating the public about these endangered nonhuman primates and the need for conservation in the wild and protection in captivity, Chimp Haven has established several public education programs including Chimpanzee Discovery Days and Chimp Chat & Chew. The sanctuary also hosts veterinary, behavioral, animal care and organizational development interns throughout the year.

Chimp Haven operates under strict standards of care that were especially created for the National Chimpanzee Sanctuary by the National Institutes of Health. Chimp Haven is the only sanctuary accredited by the American Association for Laboratory Animal Care (AALAC). Many of the sanctuary's best practices have been adopted by other sanctuaries and zoological facilities.

At Chimp Haven, chimpanzees retired from research experience many of the pleasures and freedoms they would have enjoyed in the wild: climbing trees, living in large, bonded social groups, and choosing how they spend their days.

With some of the last remaining chimpanzees still waiting their turn to come to the sanctuary, Chimp Haven is working to complete a $20 million effort to expand the sanctuary to make room for them.

== Legislation ==
On 30 October 2013, the United States Senate passed the CHIMP Act Amendments of 2013 (S. 1561; 113th Congress), a bill that would allow the National Institutes of Health (NIH) to spend additional money on housing retired chimpanzees at Chimp Haven. Francis Collins of NIH announced in November 2015 that the last 50 chimpanzees kept for testing would no longer be used for the research. As many chimpanzees as possible are being relocated to Chimp Haven.

== See also ==
- Sarah (1959–2019), a chimpanzee who retired to Chimp Haven in 2006
