= Franklin M. Jahnke =

American politician (1900–1979)

Member of the Wisconsin State Assembly from the Green Lake–Waushara district
- In office January 9, 1957 – January 6, 1969
- Preceded by: William Belter
- Succeeded by: Jon P. Wilcox

Chairman of the Green Lake County Board of Supervisors
- In office 1944–1965

Chairman of the Marquette Town Board
- In office 1933–1964

Personal details
- Born: April 29, 1900 Marquette, Wisconsin, U.S.
- Died: July 3, 1979 (aged 79) Fond du Lac, Wisconsin
- Resting place: Markesan Memorial Cemetery; Markesan, Wisconsin
- Party: Republican
- Spouse: Adelaide
- Profession: farmer, politician

Franklin M. Jahnke (April 20, 1900 – July 3, 1979) was a member of the Wisconsin State Assembly, representing Green Lake and Waushara counties.

== Biography ==
Jahnke was born on April 20, 1900, in the Town of Marquette, Wisconsin. He became a dairy farmer. He died at St. Agnes Hospital in Fond du Lac, Wisconsin, in 1979.

== Political career ==
Jahnke was a member of the Assembly from 1957 to 1969. Additionally, he was Chairman of the Town of Marquette from 1933 to 1964 and of the Green Lake County, Wisconsin Board from 1944 to 1965. He was a Republican.
