= William Belter =

American Republican politician, former member of the Wisconsin Assembly from Wautoma

William N. Belter

Member of the Wisconsin State Assembly from the Green Lake–Waushara district
- In office January, 1953 – January 9, 1957
- Preceded by: Halbert W. Brooks
- Succeeded by: Franklin M. Jahnke

Personal details
- Born: July 7, 1926 Wausau, Wisconsin, U.S.
- Died: December 12, 1999 (aged 73) Appleton, Wisconsin
- Resting place: Wautoma Union Cemetery; Wautoma, Wisconsin
- Party: Republican
- Spouse: Alcina
- Children: Alessandra; Babette; Endre
- Education: University of Wisconsin
- Profession: lawyer, businessman

William N. Belter (July 7, 1926 – December 12, 1999) was an American lawyer, businessman, and politician. He represented Green Lake and Waushara counties in the Wisconsin State Assembly from 1953 to 1957.

== Biography ==
Born in Wausau, Wisconsin, Belter graduated from high school in Wautoma, Wisconsin. He then received his bachelor's degree from University of Wisconsin and his law degree from University of Wisconsin Law School. He practiced law in Wautoma, Wisconsin. He was a real estate broker and a bank director and then president. Belter was a justice of the peace and was district attorney for Waushara County, Wisconsin from 1968 to 1977. He was also the attorney for Ed Gein during his 1968 trial in Waushara County for the murder of Bernice Worden. (Judge Robert H Gollmar 1968).

Belter also served in the Wisconsin State Assembly as a Republican from 1953 to 1957, after unsuccessfully seeking the Republican nomination for Assembly in that district in 1948 and 1950. He was defeated in the 1956 Republican assembly primary.

In 1982, when it seemed no other Republican was willing to challenge incumbent Bronson La Follette, the party attempted to recruit Belter to run for Wisconsin Attorney General. He consented to the run, but the Party ultimately did not collect enough signatures to put his name on the ballot, and he received a small number of write-in votes in the election.

== Electoral history ==
=== Wisconsin Assembly (1948-1956) ===
Wisconsin Assembly, Green Lake and Waushara District Election, 1948
Party	Candidate	Votes	%	±%
Primary Election
Republican	Halbert W. Brooks	1,761	37.90%	
Republican	Mr. Olson	1,119	24.08%	
Republican	William N. Belter	1,062	22.85%	
Republican	Mr. Krause	705	15.17%	
Total votes		'4,647'	'100.0%'	
General Election
Republican	Halbert W. Brooks	8,760	100.0%	
Total votes		'8,760'	'100.0%'	
Republican hold				

Wisconsin Assembly, Green Lake and Waushara District Election, 1950
Party	Candidate	Votes	%	±%
Primary Election
Republican	Halbert W. Brooks (incumbent)	1,650	41.04%	
Republican	William N. Belter	1,222	30.40%	
Republican	Mr. Yankowski	1,045	26.00%	
Democratic	Edward W. Getchius	68	1.69%	
Democratic	Mr. Kreilkamp	34	0.85%	
Democratic	Walter N. Losinski	1	0.02%	
Total votes		'6,348'	'100.0%'	
General Election
Republican	Halbert W. Brooks (incumbent)	7,534	76.06%	
Democratic	Edward W. Getchius	2,371	23.94%	
Total votes		'9,905'	'100.0%'	+13.07%
Republican hold				

Wisconsin Assembly, Green Lake and Waushara District Election, 1952
Party	Candidate	Votes	%	±%
Primary Election
Republican	William N. Belter	2,404	37.87%	
Republican	Halbert W. Brooks (incumbent)	2,365	37.26%	
Republican	Mr. Johnson	1,214	19.12%	
Democratic	Henry J. Emmerich	365	5.75%	
Total votes		'6,348'	'100.0%'	
General Election
Republican	William N. Belter	11,241	78.55%	
Democratic	Henry J. Emmerich	3,070	21.45%	
Total votes		'14,311'	'100.0%'	+44.48%
Republican hold				

Wisconsin Assembly, Green Lake and Waushara District Election, 1954
Party	Candidate	Votes	%	±%
Primary Election
Republican	William N. Belter (incumbent)	1,655	30.81%	
Republican	Clarence L. Poad	1,257	23.40%	
Republican	Walter N. Losinski	1,054	19.62%	
Republican	Halbert W. Brooks	984	18.32%	
Democratic	Anthony Jodarski	421	7.84%	
Total votes		'5,371'	'100.0%'	
General Election
Republican	William N. Belter (incumbent)	5,102	51.58%	
Independent	Clarence L. Poad	2,872	29.03%	
Democratic	Anthony Jodarski	1,918	19.39%	
Total votes		'9,892'	'100.0%'	-30.88%
Republican hold				

Wisconsin Assembly, Green Lake and Waushara District Election, 1956
Party	Candidate	Votes	%	±%
Primary Election
Republican	Franklin M. Jahnke	2,118	33.87%	
Republican	William N. Belter (incumbent)	1,459	23.33%	
Republican	Walter N. Losinski	1,262	20.18%	
Republican	Clarence L. Poad	1,241	19.85%	
Democratic	Harlowe W. Long	173	2.77%	
Total votes		'6,253'	'100.0%'	
General Election
Republican	Franklin M. Jahnke	10,381	100.0%	
Total votes		'10,381'	'100.0%'	+4.94%
Republican hold				

=== Wisconsin Attorney General (1982) ===
Wisconsin Attorney General Election, 1982
Party	Candidate	Votes	%	±%
Primary Election
Democratic	Bronson La Follette (incumbent)	433,513	99.24%	
Libertarian	James S. Hoffert	1,510	0.35%	
Constitution	Gene D. Lineham	1,435	0.33%	
Republican	Marcus Gumz	327	0.07%	
Republican	William N. Belter	28	0.01%	
Total votes		'436,813'	'100.0%'	
General Election
Democratic	Bronson La Follette (incumbent)	1,062,322	96.40%	
Libertarian	James S. Hoffert	27,004	2.45%	
Constitution	Gene D. Lineham	12,643	1.15%	
Total votes		'1,101,969'	'100.0%'	-22.28%
Democratic hold				
