= Sacramento, Wisconsin =

Former village in Green Lake County, Wisconsin

Sacramento
- Village
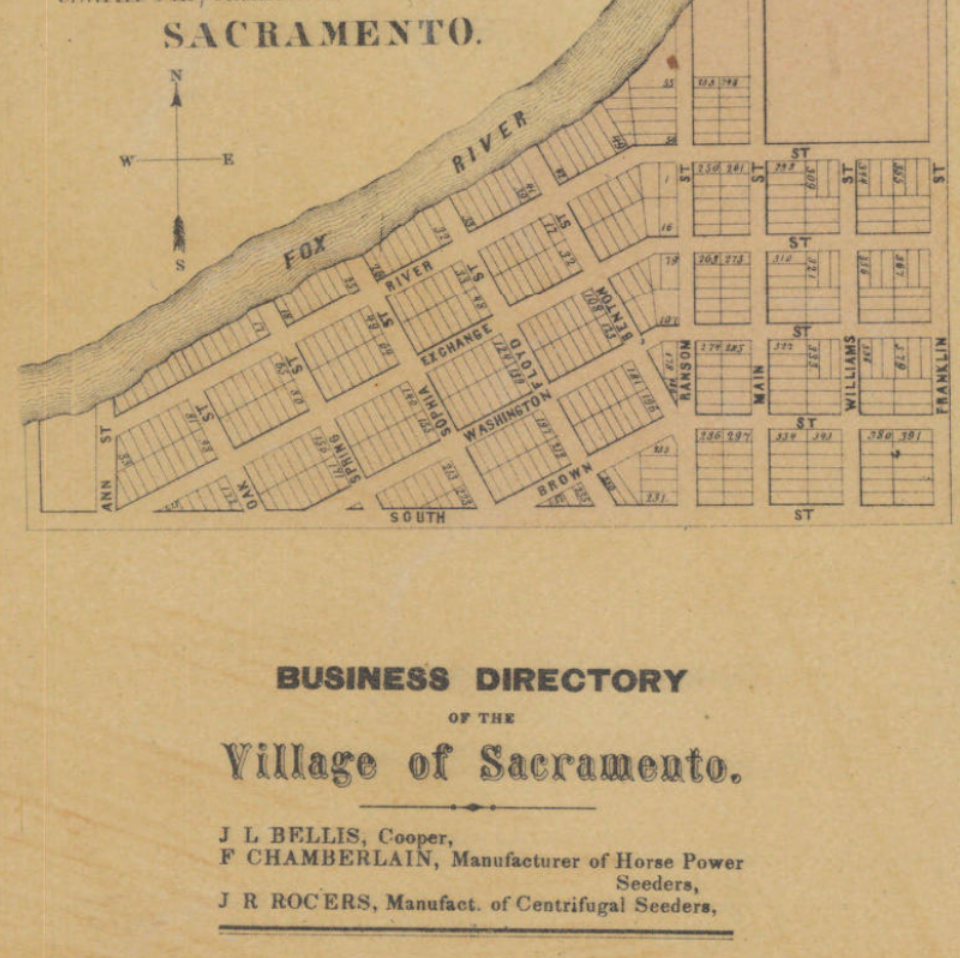
- Map and Business Directory of Sacramento, Wisconsin (1860)

- Location within Wisconsin
- Coordinates: 43.9848539°N 88.9108250°W
- Country: United States
- State: Wisconsin
- County: Waushara (until 1854); Green Lake (after 1854)
- Town: Berlin Township
- Established: 1849
- Founder: Mr. Hatch

Population (1860)
  - Total: 300
- Time zone: UTC-6:00 (CST)
  - Summer (DST): UTC-5:00 (CDT)

Sacramento, Wisconsin is a former village on the Fox River in Berlin Township of Green Lake County, Wisconsin. First platted in 1849 by a Mr. Hatch, who had returned from the California gold rush with memories of Sacramento, California, it was originally part of Waushara County, and was in fact the original county seat of that county upon its establishment. The county seat was moved to Wautoma in September 1854 after a referendum; and the portion of Waushara County south of the Fox which included Sacramento was ceded to Green Lake County sometime after the latter's 1858 creation. In 1860, it had a population of about 300.

The village was abandoned soon after this period; a 1936 article from a local paper describes the village as having died out entirely, with the remaining buildings having been moved to an island in a cranberry bog to house workers, leaving nothing behind but an abandoned cemetery; and most historical records from that period had been destroyed in a fire at the Waushara County courthouse.
