= Halbert W. Brooks =

American politician

Halbert Wilson Brooks (December 9, 1885 – March 17, 1963) was a member of the Wisconsin State Assembly.

== Biography ==
Brooks was born on December 9, 1885, in Green Lake, Wisconsin. He attended Ripon College, where he later became the track coach. He married Irene Gilkey (1887–1968) in 1908. From 1925 to 1926, he was Sheriff of Green Lake County, Wisconsin. He died at a retirement home in Markesan, Wisconsin, in 1963.

== Political career ==
Brooks was a member of the Assembly twice. First, from 1945 to 1946 and second, from 1949 to 1952. Additionally, he was President and Treasurer of Green Lake and a member of the Green Lake County Board. He was a Republican.
