= Mackford, Wisconsin =

- Town
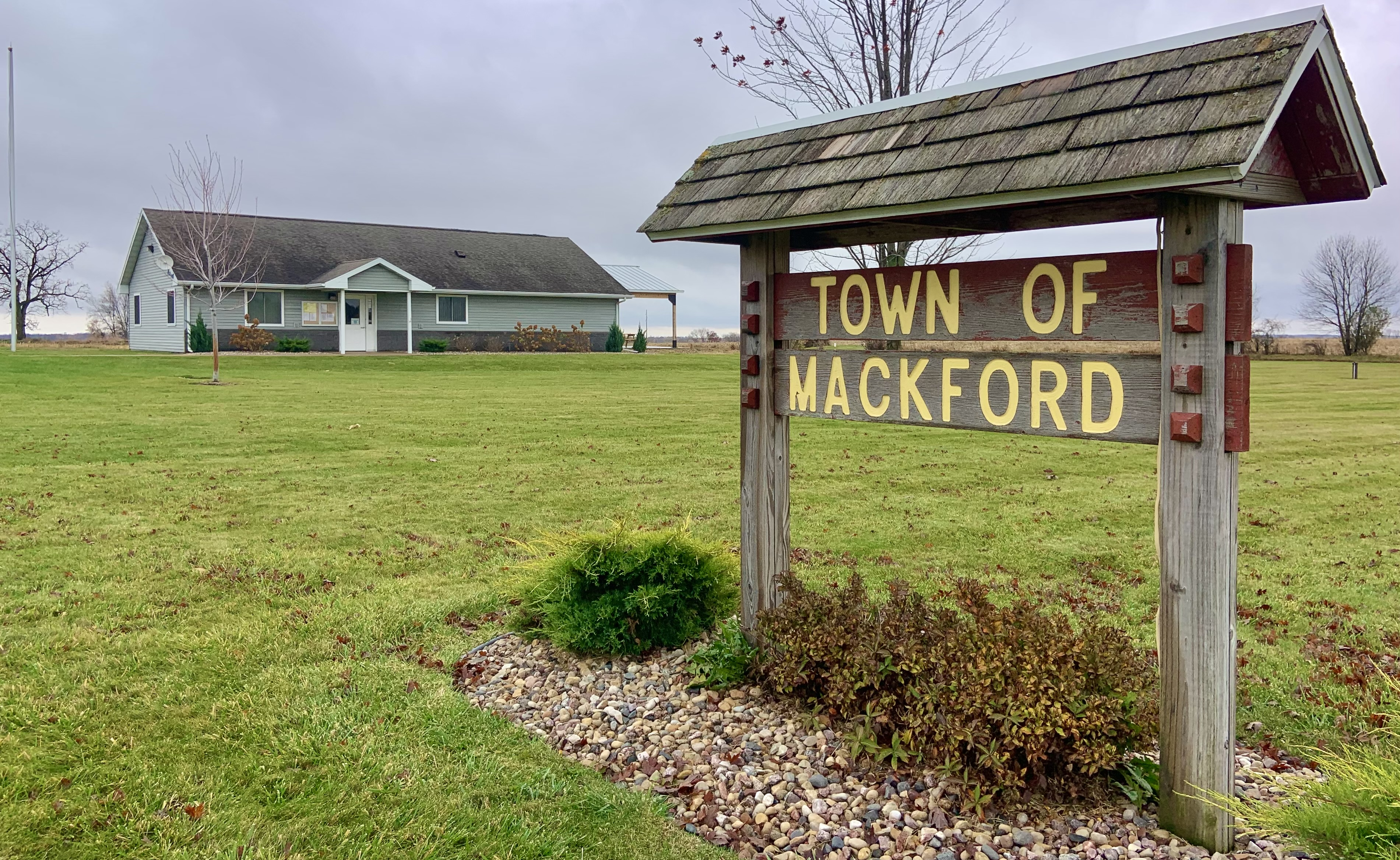
- Town hall

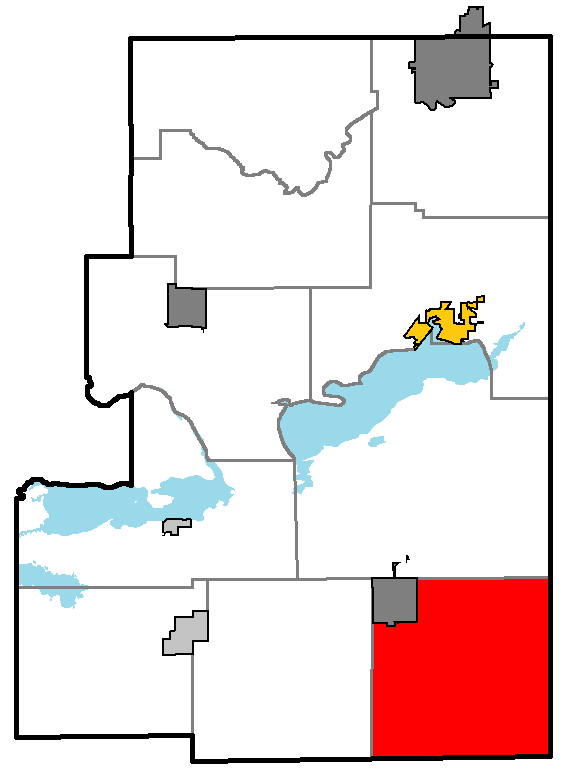
- Location of Mackford, Wisconsin

- Location of Green Lake County, Wisconsin
- Coordinates: 43°40′55″N 88°56′27″W
- Country: United States
- State: Wisconsin
- County: Green Lake

Area
  - Total: 34.3 sq mi (88.8 km^{2})
  - Land: 33.6 sq mi (86.9 km^{2})
  - Water: 0.69 sq mi (1.8 km^{2})
- Elevation: 991 ft (302 m)

Population (2020)
  - Total: 495
  - Density: 14.8/sq mi (5.70/km^{2})
- Time zone: UTC-6 (Central (CST))
  - Summer (DST): UTC-5 (CDT)
- Area code: 920
- FIPS code: 55-46875
- GNIS feature ID: 1583620
- Website: https://www.townofmackfordwi.gov/

Mackford is a town in Green Lake County, Wisconsin, United States. The population was 495 at the 2020 census. The city of Markesan is surrounded by the town.

== Geography ==
According to the United States Census Bureau, the town has a total area of 34.3 square miles (88.8 km^{2}), of which 33.6 square miles (86.9 km^{2}) is land and 0.7 square mile (1.8 km^{2}) (2.04%) is water.

== Demographics ==
As of the census of 2000, there were 585 people, 210 households, and 166 families residing in the town. The population density was 17.4 people per square mile (6.7/km^{2}). There were 215 housing units at an average density of 6.4 per square mile (2.5/km^{2}). The racial makeup of the town was 99.83% White, 0.17% from other races. Hispanic or Latino of any race were 0.34% of the population.

There were 210 households, out of which 37.1% had children under the age of 18 living with them, 71.9% were married couples living together, 4.8% had a female householder with no husband present, and 20.5% were non-families. 18.6% of all households were made up of individuals, and 6.7% had someone living alone who was 65 years of age or older. The average household size was 2.79 and the average family size was 3.17.

In the town, the population was spread out, with 28.7% under the age of 18, 7.2% from 18 to 24, 31.3% from 25 to 44, 23.1% from 45 to 64, and 9.7% who were 65 years of age or older. The median age was 36 years. For every 100 females, there were 108.9 males. For every 100 females age 18 and over, there were 109.5 males.

The median income for a household in the town was $44,688, and the median income for a family was $47,167. Males had a median income of $28,906 versus $21,635 for females. The per capita income for the town was $20,351. About 3.1% of families and 7.0% of the population were below the poverty line, including 7.2% of those under age 18 and 3.4% of those age 65 or over.
