= Manchester (community), Green Lake County, Wisconsin =

Manchester, Green Lake County, Wisconsin
- Unincorporated community
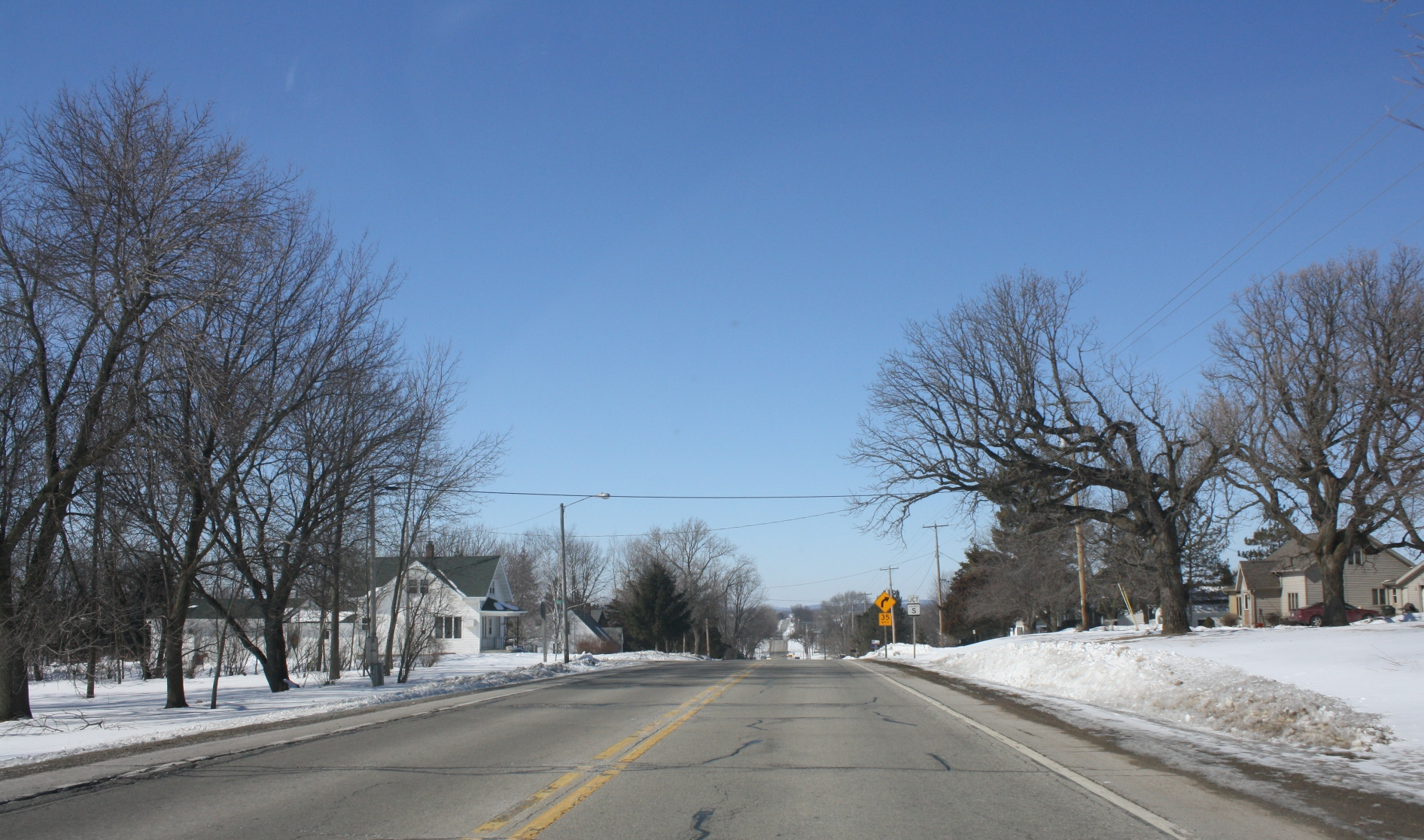
- Looking west along WIS44 / WIS73

- Location within Wisconsin Location within the United States
- Coordinates: 43°41′26″N 89°02′54″W
- Country: United States
- State: Wisconsin
- County: Green Lake
- Town: Manchester
- Elevation: 876 ft (267 m)
- Time zone: UTC-6 (Central (CST))
  - Summer (DST): UTC-5 (CDT)
- Area code: 920
- GNIS feature ID: 1568932

Manchester is an unincorporated community in the town of Manchester, Green Lake County, Wisconsin, United States. It is located along state highways 44 and 73, 3 miles (4.8 km) west-southwest of Markesan.

== Images ==
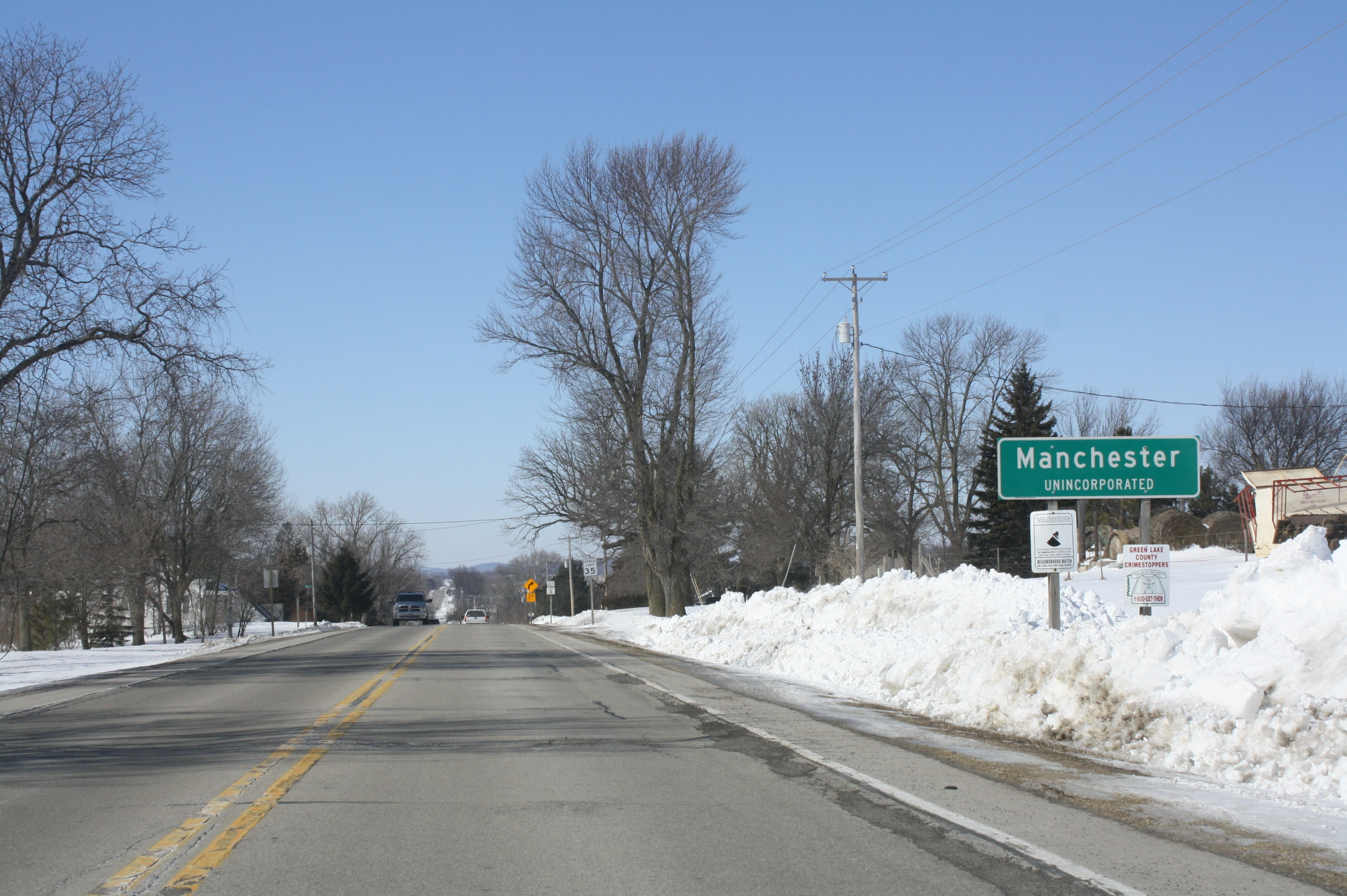
Looking west at the sign for Manchester

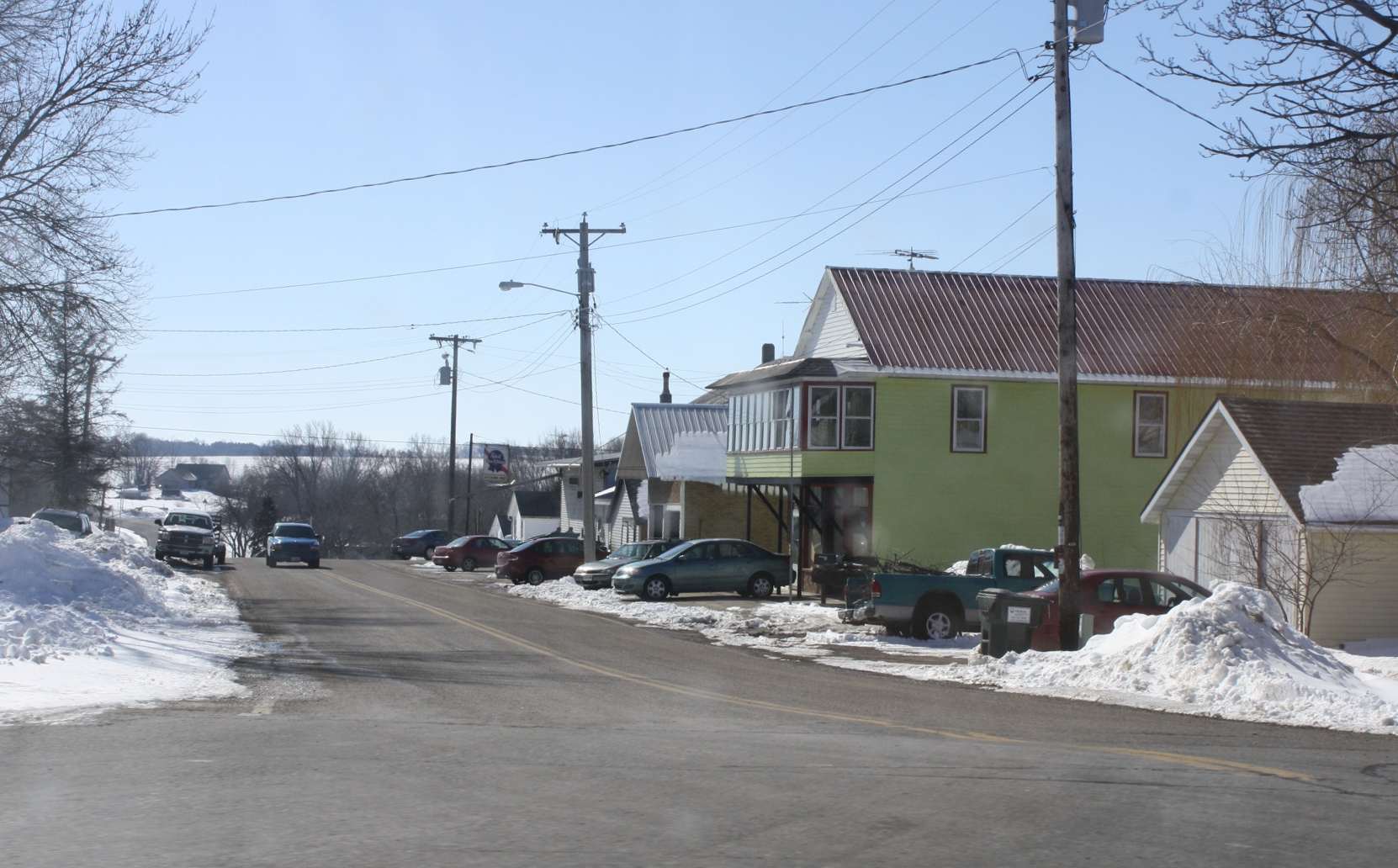
Looking south

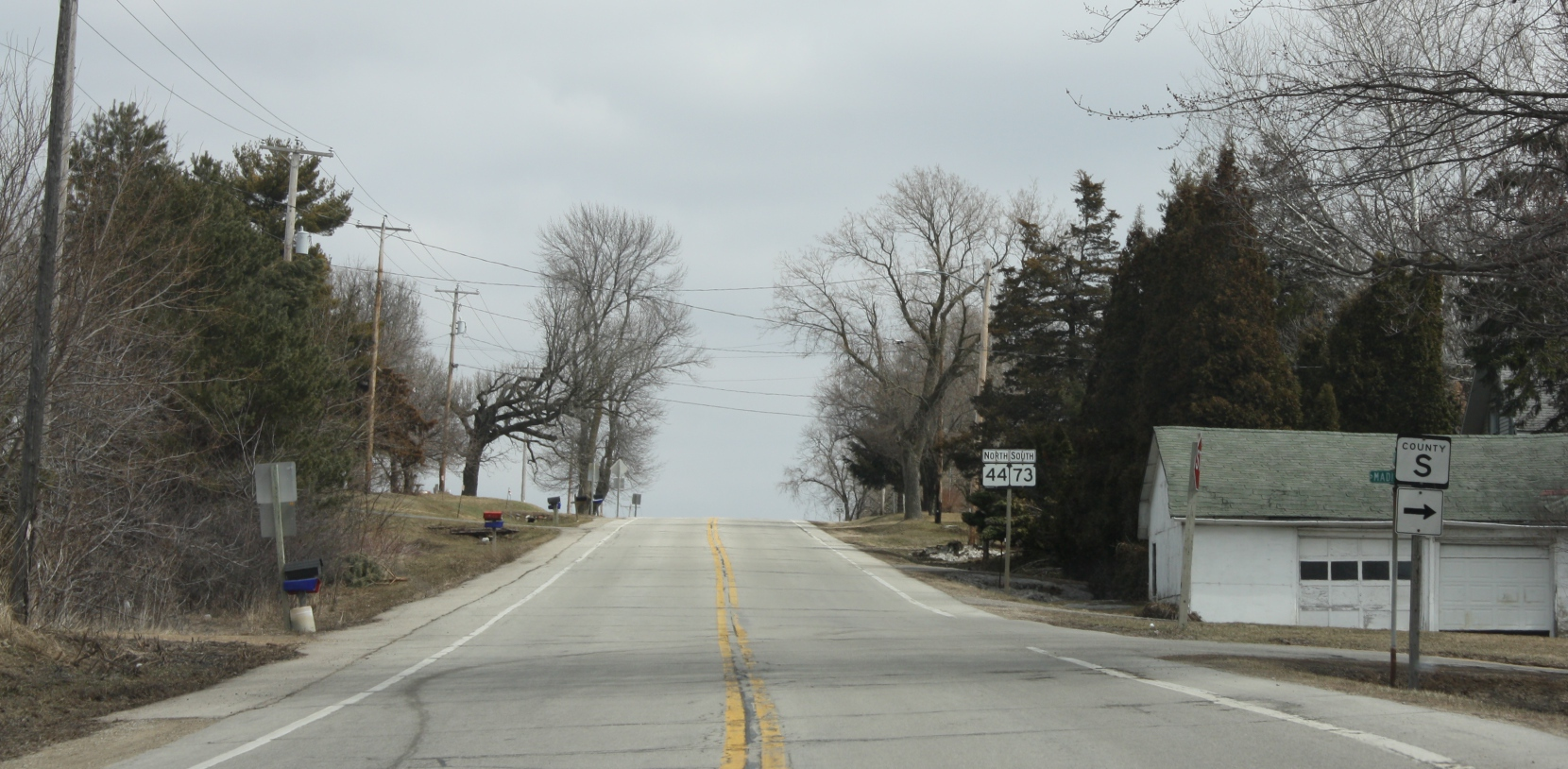
Looking east
