= Alex McDonald (Wisconsin politician) =

American politician

Alexander McDonald (June 28, 1866 – April 20, 1936) was an American politician and businessman.

Born in the town of Manchester, Green Lake County, Wisconsin, McDonald received his bachelor's degree from Valparaiso University in 1889. He was a farmer, real estate developer, bank director, and in the canning industry. McDonald was the town clerk and the supervisor of assessment for Green Lake County. He lived in Markesan, Wisconsin. McDonald served in the Wisconsin State Assembly from 1932 to 1934 and was a Democrat. McDonald died of a heart ailment at his home in Markesan, Wisconsin.
