= Kingston, Wisconsin =

- Village
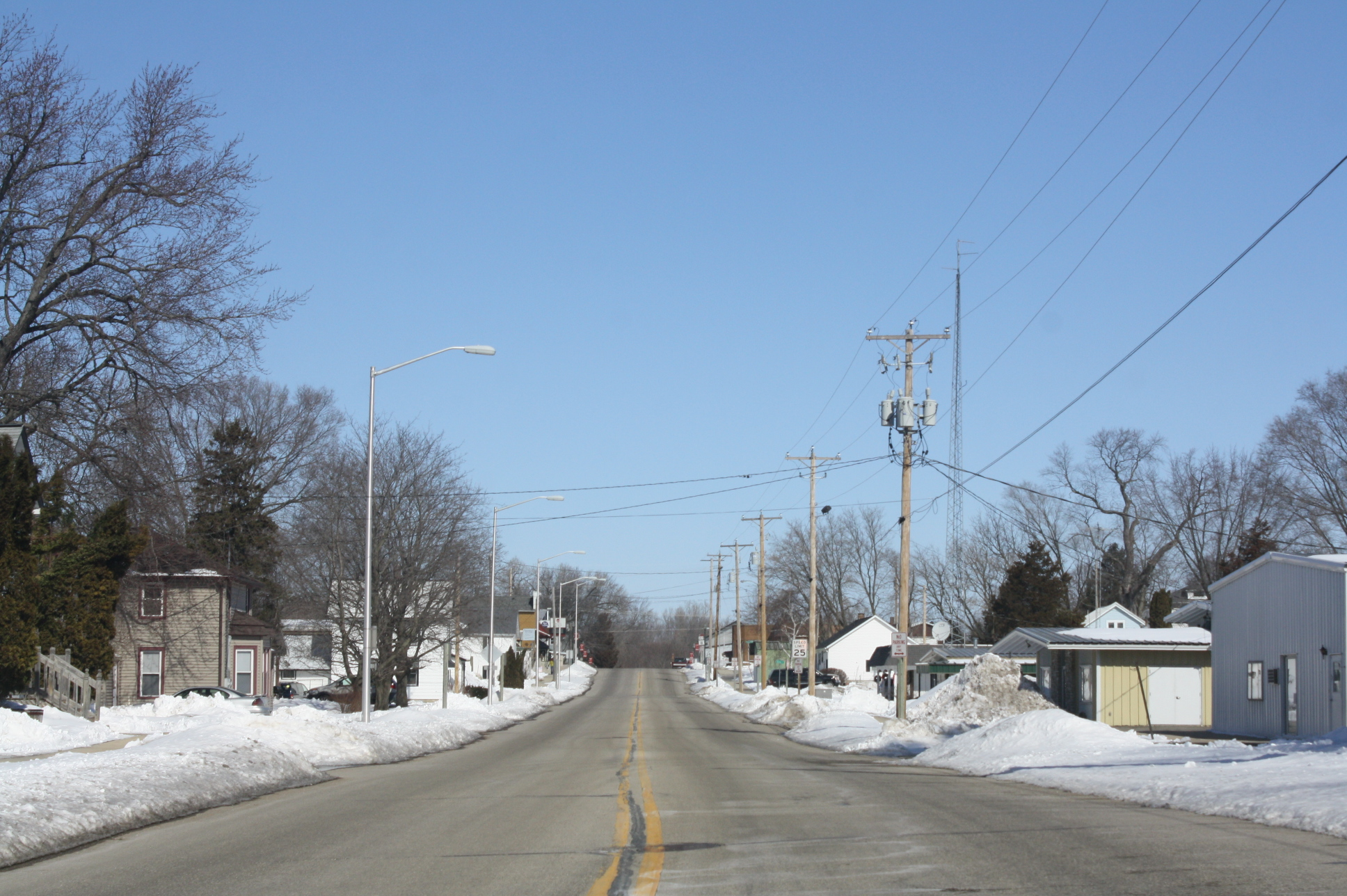
- Looking north in downtown Kingston

- Location of Kingston in Green Lake County, Wisconsin.

- Location within Wisconsin Location within the United States
- Coordinates: 43°41′37″N 89°7′43″W
- Country: United States
- State: Wisconsin
- County: Green Lake

Area
  - Total: 1.53 sq mi (3.95 km^{2})
  - Land: 1.31 sq mi (3.38 km^{2})
  - Water: 0.22 sq mi (0.57 km^{2})

Population (2020)
  - Total: 281
  - Density: 215/sq mi (83.1/km^{2})
- Time zone: UTC-6 (Central (CST))
  - Summer (DST): UTC-5 (CDT)
- Area code: 920
- FIPS code: 55-39750
- Website: https://kingstonvillagewi.com/

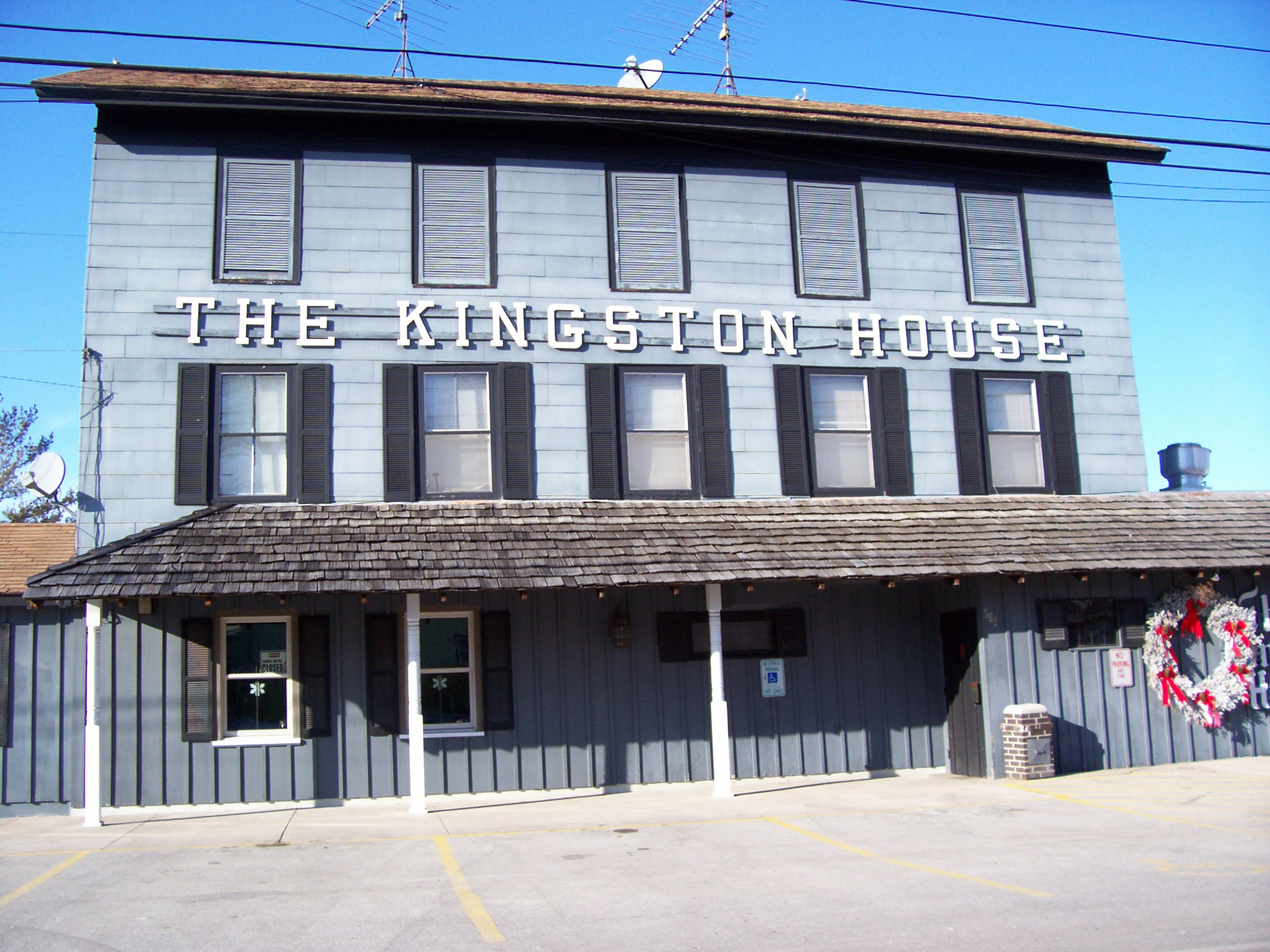
The Kingston House

Kingston is a village in Green Lake County, Wisconsin, United States. The population was 281 at the 2020 census. The village is located within the Town of Kingston. The unincorporated community of Dalton is near Kingston.

The village is named for Kingston, Ontario.

The Kingston area is home to a sizable Old Order Amish community, founded in 1977 by people from northern Indiana. The Kingston Amish population is estimated at 2,595.

== Geography ==
Kingston is located at 43°41′36″N 89°7′42″W (43.693508, -89.128563).

According to the United States Census Bureau, the village has a total area of 1.54 square miles (3.99 km^{2}), of which 1.32 square miles (3.42 km^{2}) is land and 0.22 square miles (0.57 km^{2}) is water.

== Demographics ==
Historical population
Census	Pop.	Note	%±
1930	270		—
1940	295		9.3%
1950	334		13.2%
1960	343		2.7%
1970	343		0.0%
1980	328		−4.4%
1990	346		5.5%
2000	288		−16.8%
2010	326		13.2%
2020	281		−13.8%
U.S. Decennial Census

=== 2010 census ===
As of the census of 2010, there were 326 people, 139 households, and 88 families living in the village. The population density was 247.0 inhabitants per square mile (95.4/km^{2}). There were 148 housing units at an average density of 112.1 per square mile (43.3/km^{2}). The racial makeup of the village was 98.5% White, 0.3% African American, and 1.2% from other races. Hispanic or Latino of any race were 2.8% of the population.

There were 139 households, of which 27.3% had children under the age of 18 living with them, 51.1% were married couples living together, 7.2% had a female householder with no husband present, 5.0% had a male householder with no wife present, and 36.7% were non-families. 32.4% of all households were made up of individuals, and 11.5% had someone living alone who was 65 years of age or older. The average household size was 2.35 and the average family size was 2.92.

The median age in the village was 39.8 years. 23.3% of residents were under the age of 18; 7.7% were between the ages of 18 and 24; 25.6% were from 25 to 44; 27.6% were from 45 to 64; and 15.6% were 65 years of age or older. The gender makeup of the village was 53.7% male and 46.3% female.

=== 2000 census ===
As of the census of 2000, there were 288 people, 123 households, and 83 families living in the village. The population density was 212.7 people per square mile (82.4/km^{2}). There were 133 housing units at an average density of 98.2 per square mile (38.0/km^{2}). The racial makeup of the village was 98.61% White and 1.39% Native American. 0.35% of the population were Hispanic or Latino of any race.

There were 123 households, out of which 27.6% had children under the age of 18 living with them, 50.4% were married couples living together, 11.4% had a female householder with no husband present, and 32.5% were non-families. 27.6% of all households were made up of individuals, and 15.4% had someone living alone who was 65 years of age or older. The average household size was 2.34 and the average family size was 2.86.

In the village, the population was spread out, with 23.6% under the age of 18, 7.3% from 18 to 24, 29.9% from 25 to 44, 20.5% from 45 to 64, and 18.8% who were 65 years of age or older. The median age was 39 years. For every 100 females, there were 97.3 males. For every 100 females age 18 and over, there were 94.7 males.

The median income for a household in the village was $36,250, and the median income for a family was $48,125. Males had a median income of $31,786 versus $22,000 for females. The per capita income for the village was $18,770. About 2.8% of families and 5.1% of the population were below the poverty line, including 7.1% of those under the age of eighteen and none of those 65 or over.

== Education ==
It is in the Markesan School District.

== Notable people ==
- Ira W. Parker, Wisconsin State Representative and banker, was born in Kingston.
- John Muir, famed conservationist, spoke about passing through Kingston when his family moved from Scotland to the USA, as recounted in the book “The Wilderness World of John Muir” (Edited by Edwin Way Teale).

== Images ==
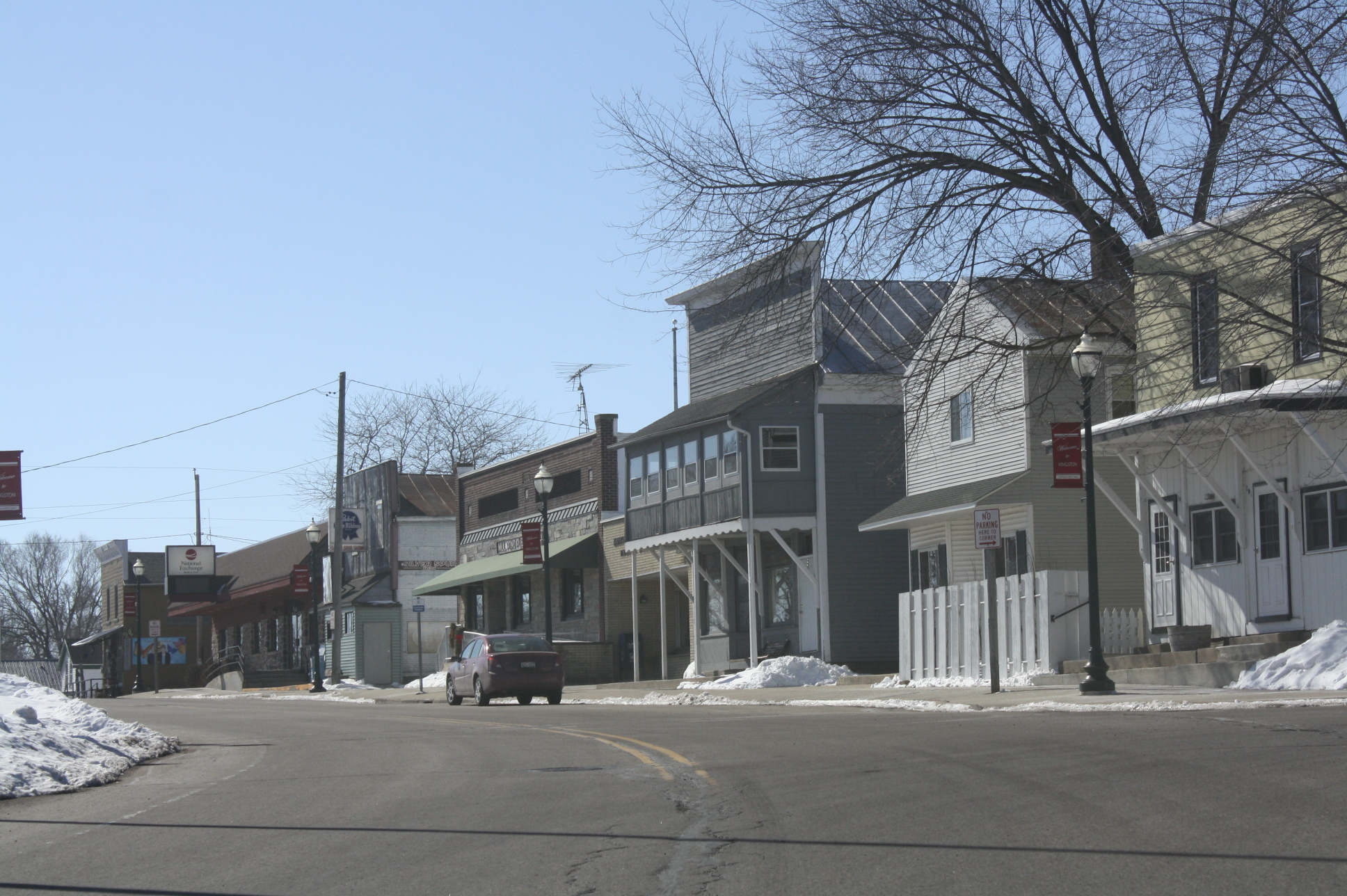
Looking south at downtown Kingston

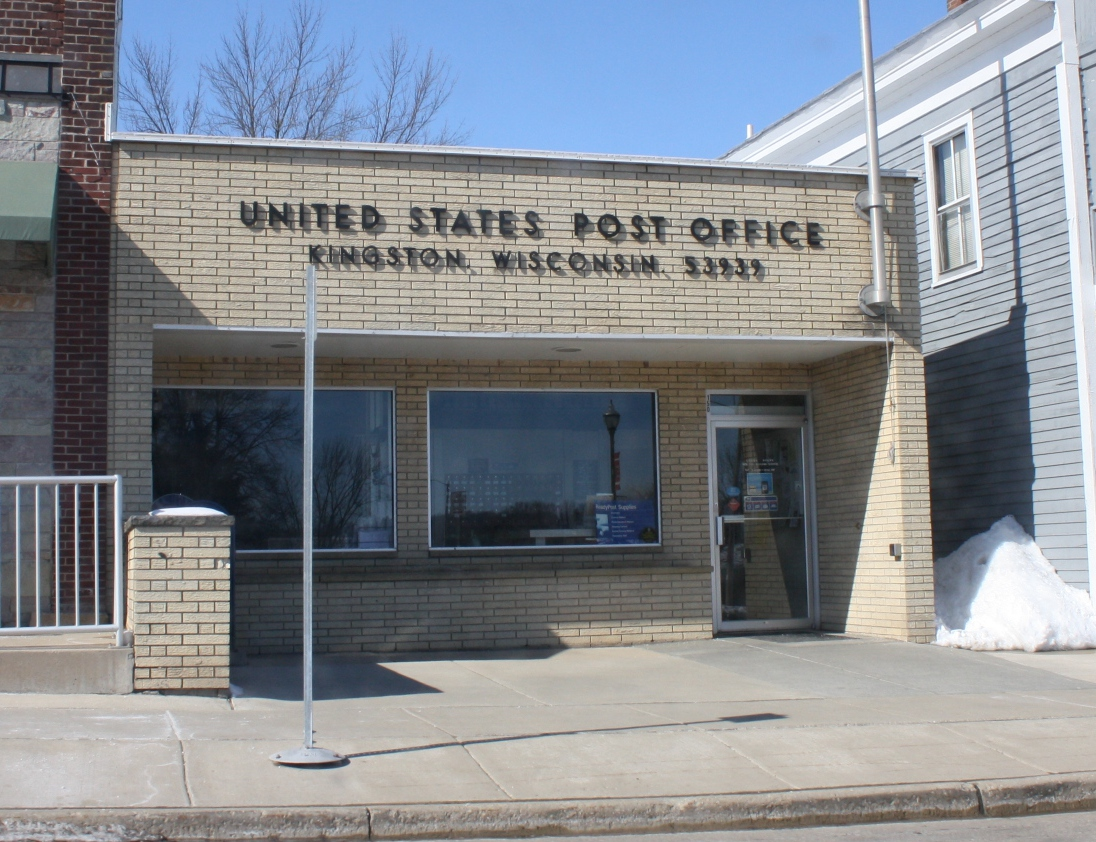
Post office

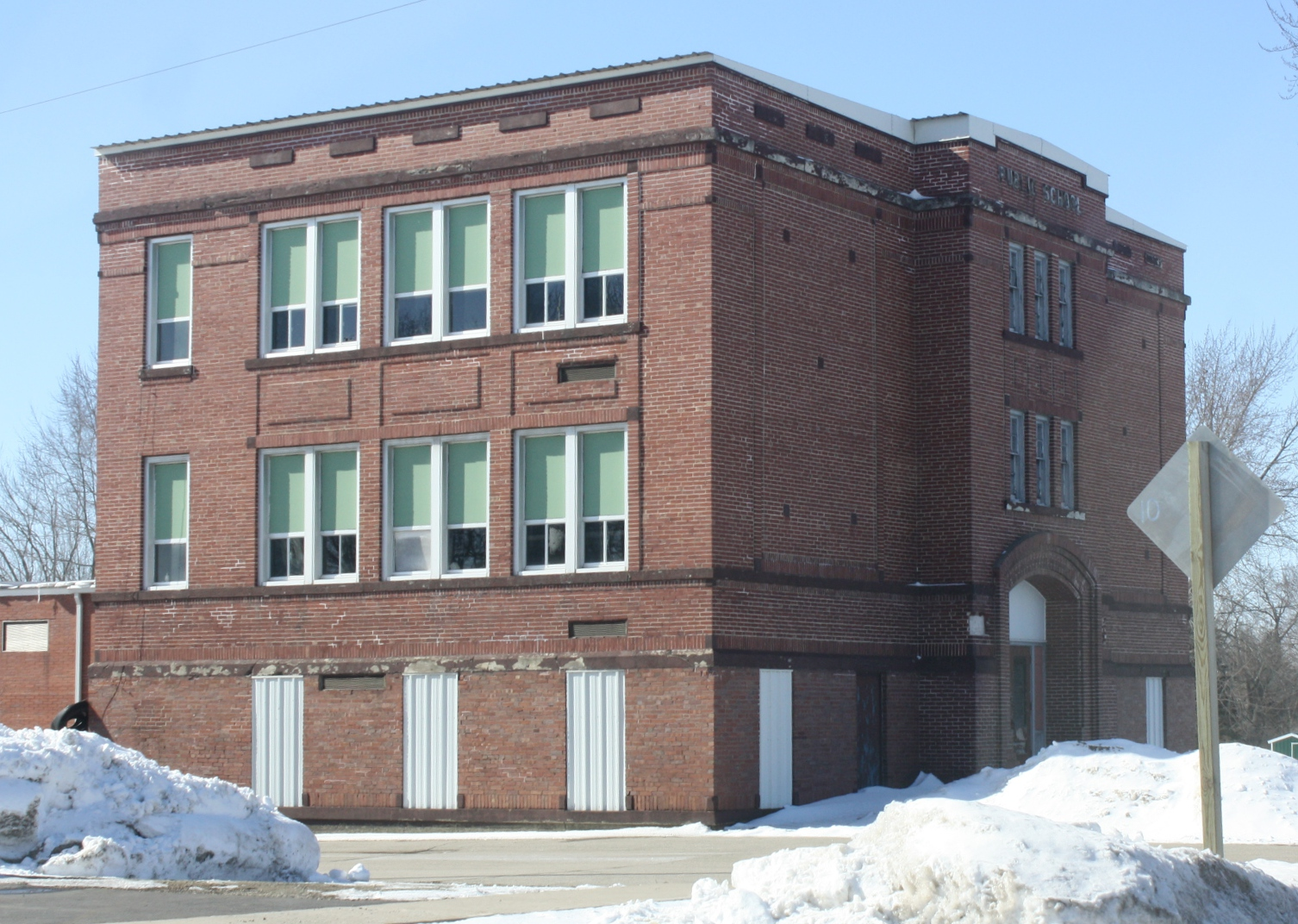
Former public school

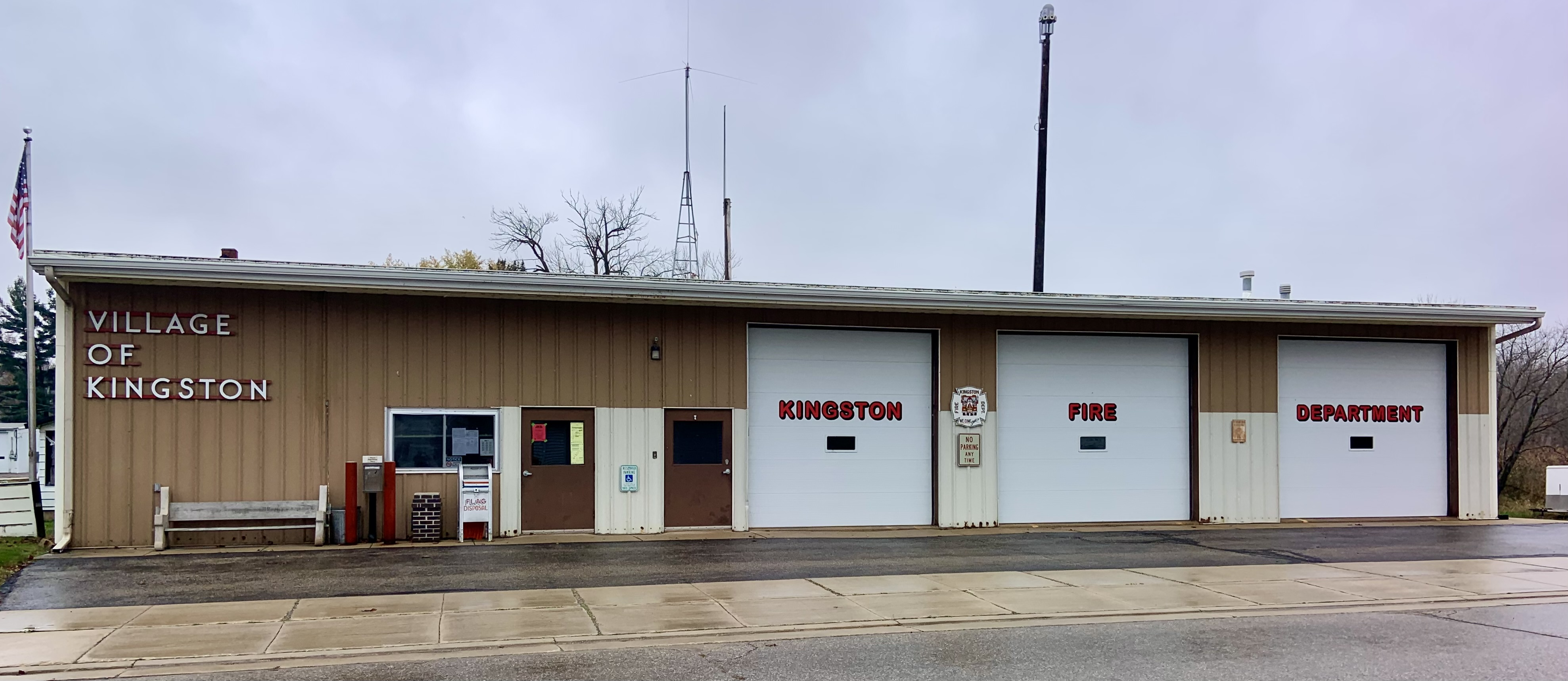
Village hall

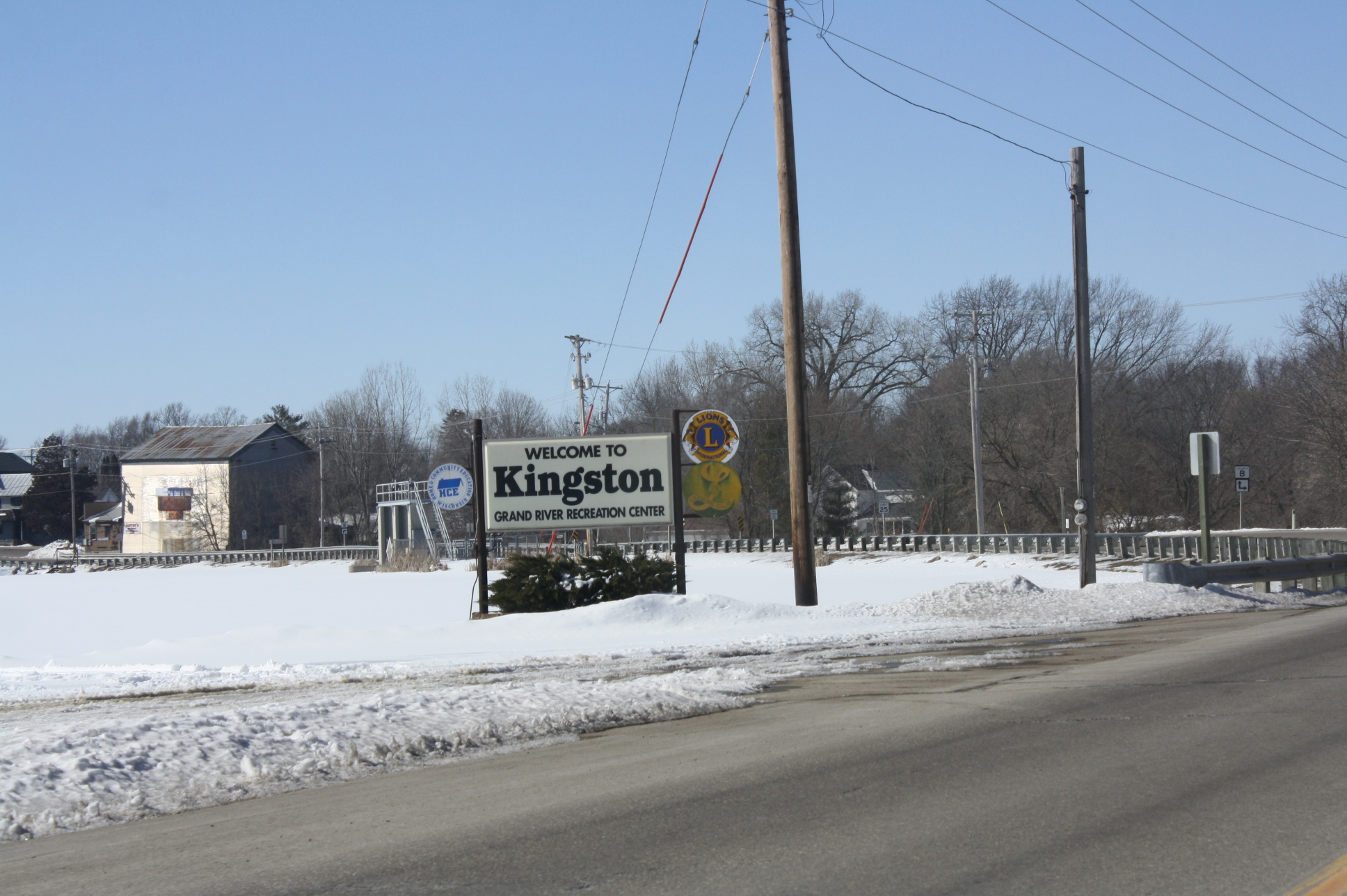
Welcome sign with Mill Pond in background

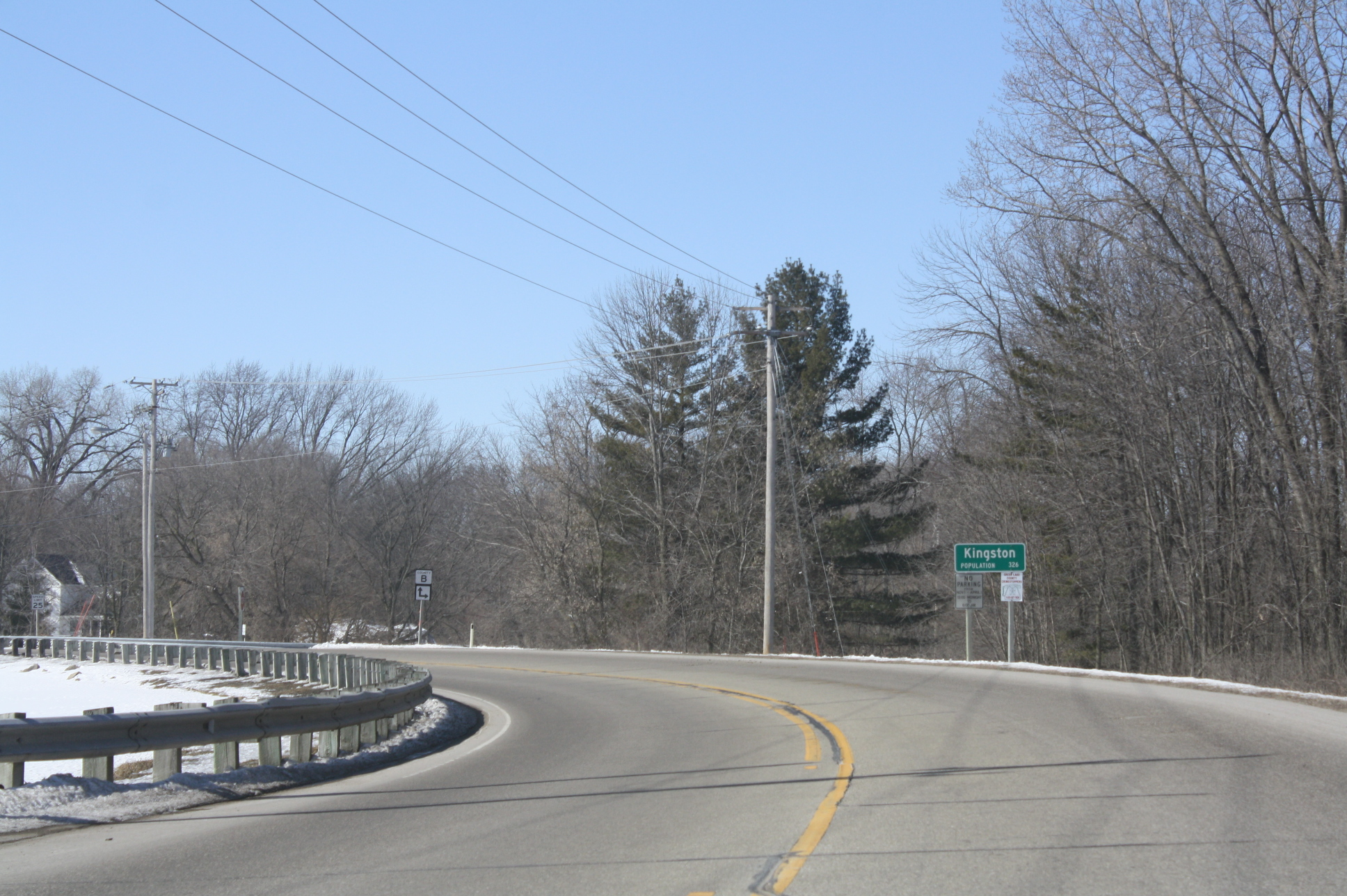
Sign

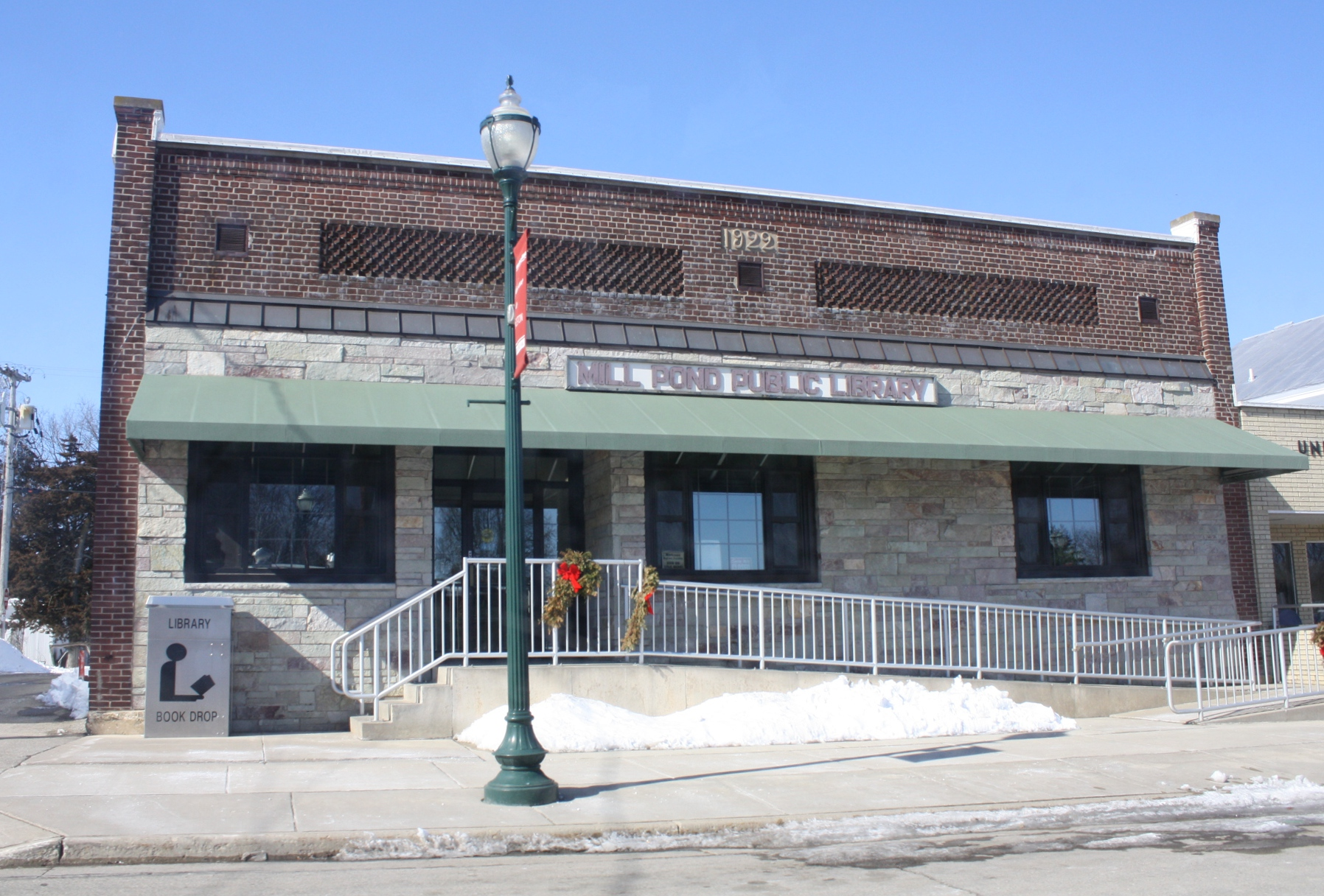
Mill Pond Library
