= Seneca, Green Lake County, Wisconsin =

Seneca, Wisconsin
- Town
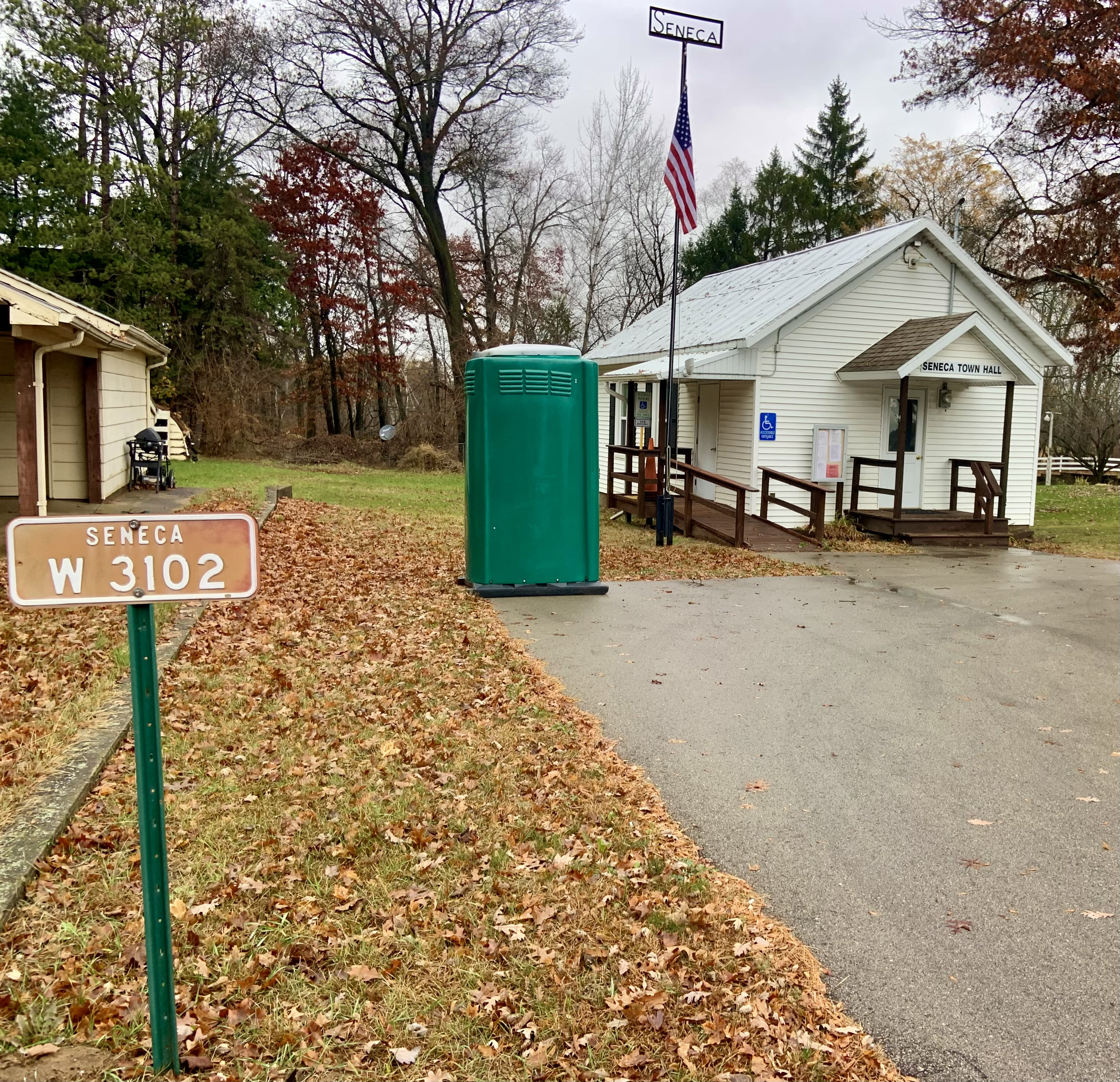
- Town hall

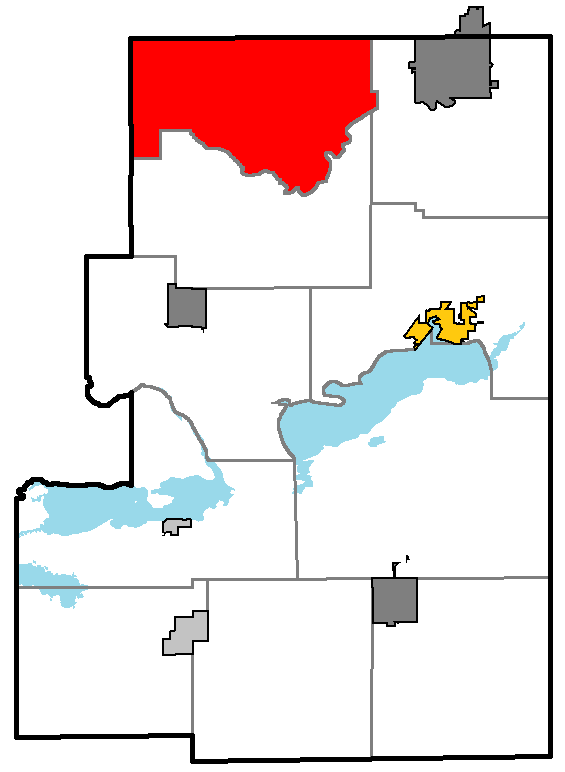
- Location of Seneca, Wisconsin

- Location of Green Lake County
- Coordinates: 43°57′43″N 89°4′48″W
- Country: United States
- State: Wisconsin
- County: Green Lake

Government
  - Mayor: Gerald Neubauer Jr

Area
  - Total: 32.8 sq mi (85.0 km^{2})
  - Land: 32.7 sq mi (84.8 km^{2})
  - Water: 0.077 sq mi (0.2 km^{2})
- Elevation: 764 ft (233 m)

Population (2020)
  - Total: 387
  - Density: 11.8/sq mi (4.56/km^{2})
- Time zone: UTC-6 (Central (CST))
  - Summer (DST): UTC-5 (CDT)
- Area code: 920
- FIPS code: 55-72525
- GNIS feature ID: 1584122
- Website: https://townofsenecagreenlakeco.com/

Seneca is a town in Green Lake County, Wisconsin, United States. The population was 387 at the 2020 census. The unincorporated community of Fairburn is located in the town.

== Geography ==
According to the United States Census Bureau, the town has a total area of 32.8 square miles (85.0 km^{2}), of which 32.7 square miles (84.8 km^{2}) is land and 0.1 square mile (0.2 km^{2}) (0.21%) is water.

== Demographics ==
As of the census of 2000, there were 424 people, 165 households, and 120 families residing in the town. The population density was 12.9 people per square mile (5.0/km^{2}). There were 194 housing units at an average density of 5.9 per square mile (2.3/km^{2}). The racial makeup of the town was 97.41% White, 0.24% African American, 0.24% Native American, 0.24% Pacific Islander, and 1.89% from two or more races. Hispanic or Latino of any race were 0.47% of the population.

There were 165 households, out of which 29.7% had children under the age of 18 living with them, 66.7% were married couples living together, 3.6% had a female householder with no husband present, and 26.7% were non-families. 23.0% of all households were made up of individuals, and 11.5% had someone living alone who was 65 years of age or older. The average household size was 2.57 and the average family size was 3.02.

In the town, the population was spread out, with 22.2% under the age of 18, 7.5% from 18 to 24, 27.8% from 25 to 44, 29.7% from 45 to 64, and 12.7% who were 65 years of age or older. The median age was 40 years. For every 100 females, there were 118.6 males. For every 100 females age 18 and over, there were 112.9 males.

The median income for a household in the town was $48,594, and the median income for a family was $52,788. Males had a median income of $32,500 versus $23,571 for females. The per capita income for the town was $17,839. About 2.5% of families and 4.2% of the population were below the poverty line, including none of those under age 18 and 18.9% of those age 65 or over.
