= Kingston, Green Lake County, Wisconsin =

Kingston, Wisconsin
- Town
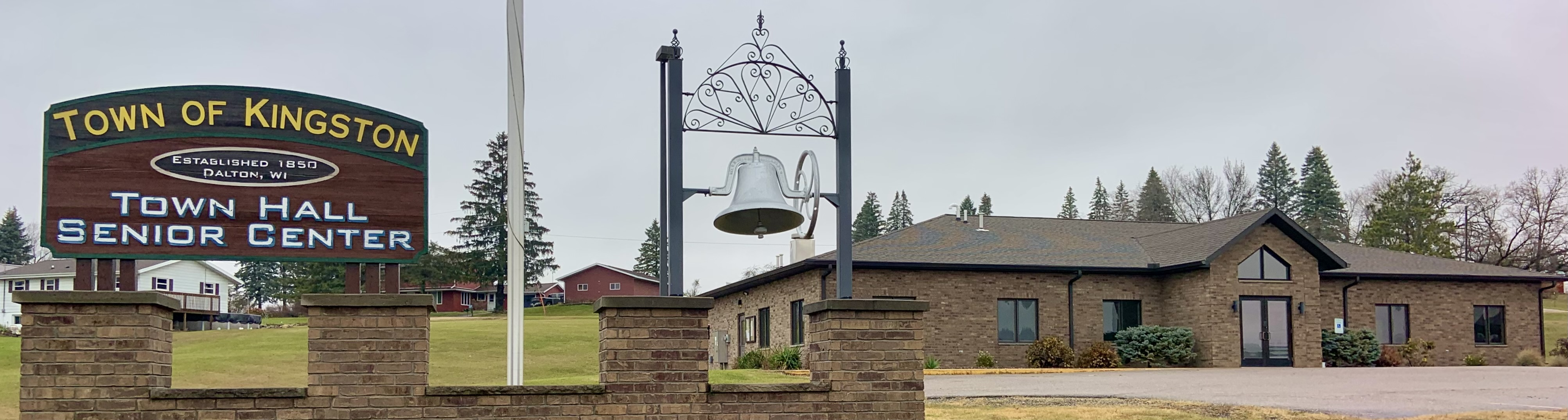
- Town hall in Dalton

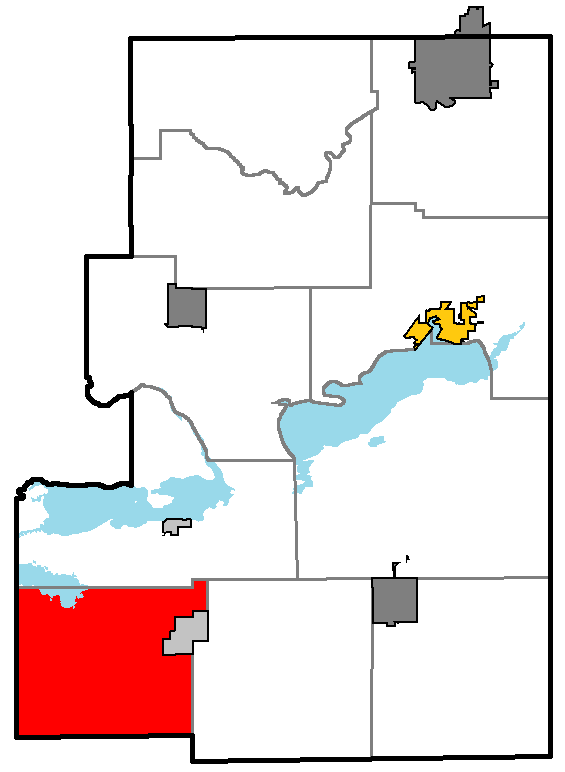
- Location of Kingston, within Green Lake County, Wisconsin

- Location within Wisconsin
- Coordinates: 43°39′51″N 89°11′49″W
- Country: United States
- State: Wisconsin
- County: Green Lake

Area
  - Total: 29.4 sq mi (76.2 km^{2})
  - Land: 28.8 sq mi (74.7 km^{2})
  - Water: 0.58 sq mi (1.5 km^{2})
- Elevation: 784 ft (239 m)

Population (2020)
  - Total: 1,079
  - Density: 37.4/sq mi (14.4/km^{2})
- Time zone: UTC-6 (Central (CST))
  - Summer (DST): UTC-5 (CDT)
- Area code: 920
- FIPS code: 55-39775
- GNIS feature ID: 1583484
- Website: https://www.townofkingstongreenlakecountywi.gov/

Kingston is a town in Green Lake County, Wisconsin, United States. The population was 1,079 at the 2020 census. The Village of Kingston and the unincorporated community of Dalton are located within the town.

== Geography ==
According to the United States Census Bureau, the town has a total area of 29.4 square miles (76.2 km^{2}), of which 28.8 square miles (74.7 km^{2}) is land and 0.6 square mile (1.5 km^{2}) (1.97%) is water.

== Demographics ==
As of the census of 2000, there were 900 people, 287 households, and 227 families residing in the town. The population density was 31.2 people per square mile (12.1/km^{2}). There were 344 housing units at an average density of 11.9 per square mile (4.6/km^{2}). The racial makeup of the town was 97.11% White, 0.22% Black or African American, 0.11% Native American, 0.22% Asian, and 2.33% from two or more races. 1.33% of the population were Hispanic or Latino of any race.

There were 287 households, out of which 39.7% had children under the age of 18 living with them, 70.4% were married couples living together, 5.2% had a female householder with no husband present, and 20.6% were non-families. 16.7% of all households were made up of individuals, and 7.3% had someone living alone who was 65 years of age or older. The average household size was 3.14 and the average family size was 3.60.

In the town, the population was spread out, with 34.6% under the age of 18, 8.9% from 18 to 24, 24.4% from 25 to 44, 19.2% from 45 to 64, and 12.9% who were 65 years of age or older. The median age was 32 years. For every 100 females, there were 93.1 males. For every 100 females age 18 and over, there were 103.8 males.

The median income for a household in the town was $39,345, and the median income for a family was $41,667. Males had a median income of $30,875 versus $18,958 for females. The per capita income for the town was $13,581. About 9.7% of families and 13.6% of the population were below the poverty line, including 22.7% of those under age 18 and 5.0% of those age 65 or over.
