= Delphine Hanna =

American physical educator

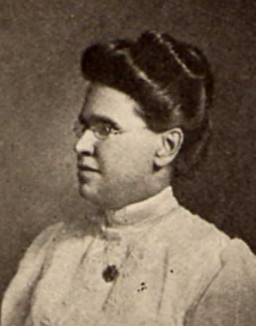
- Delphine Hanna, from a 1910 yearbook
- Born: December 2, 1854; Markesan, Wisconsin, US
- Died: April 16, 1941 (aged 86); Castile, New York, US
- Occupations: Physician, college professor

Delphine Hanna (December 2, 1854 – April 16, 1941) was an American physician, teacher, and college professor. She taught physical education at Oberlin College beginning in 1885, and became the first woman to hold the title "Professor of Physical Education" in the United States in 1903.

== Early life ==
Hanna was born in Markesan, Wisconsin, the daughter of John Vacausan Hanna and Juliet Chadwick Hanna. She moved to New York in 1864 after her mother's death, and earned a teaching credential from Brockport State Normal School in 1874, studied physical culture with Diocletian Lewis and Dudley Allen Sargent, and completed a medical degree from the University of Michigan in 1890. She completed a bachelor's degree from Cornell University in 1901.

== Career ==
Hanna taught school in New York and Kansas as a young woman. She taught at Oberlin College from 1885 to 1920. Adelia Field Johnston hired Hanna to start a physical education program for women students; she also taught a class for male students, and another for faculty members. She was director of the school's Women's Gymnasium, and of the school's course for training teachers of physical education. Under her direction, the school added tennis courts, a basketball court, and a skating rink. She established the first four-year program for women to earn a bachelor's degree in physical education, and in 1903 became the first woman to be a full professor of physical education in the United States. In summer 1905, she made a study trip to Germany and Sweden. In 1931, she was named in the first cohort of fellows of the American Physical Education Association.

Hanna's Oberlin students included many highly influential physical educators, including Luther Halsey Gulick., Fred Eugene Leonard, Jay B. Nash, Jesse F. Williams, and Thomas D. Wood, all of whom went on to become elected Fellows in the National Academy of Kinesiology (née American Academy of Physical Education).

== Personal life ==
Hanna retired in 1920 and moved to Coconut Grove, Florida; she died in Castile, New York, in 1941, aged 86 years. Oberlin established the Delphine Hanna Foundation to support physical education programs at the college. Since 1992, the National Association of Kinesiology in Higher Education (NAKHE) has held an annual Delphine Hanna Lecture in her memory. Her grave is with those of her relatives in Perinton, New York.
