= Manchester, Green Lake County, Wisconsin =

Manchester, Wisconsin
- Town
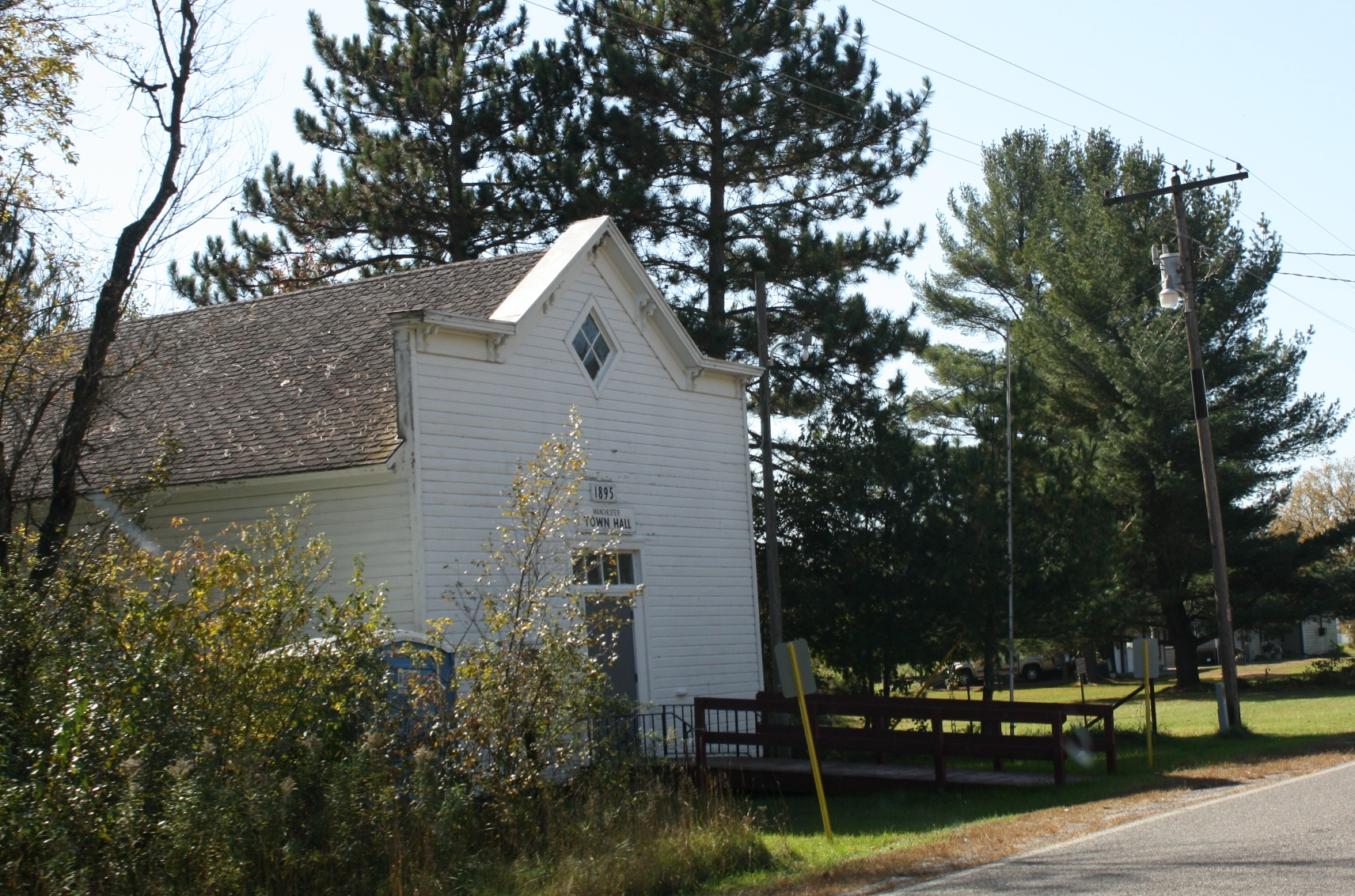
- Manchester Town Hall

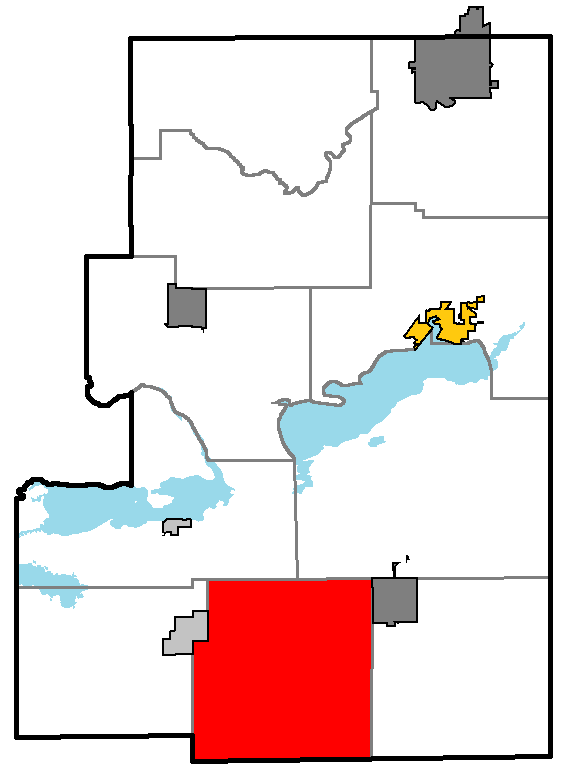
- Location of Manchester, Wisconsin

- Location of Green Lake County, Wisconsin
- Coordinates: 43°40′30″N 89°4′4″W
- Country: United States
- State: Wisconsin
- County: Green Lake

Area
  - Total: 35.4 sq mi (91.6 km^{2})
  - Land: 34.9 sq mi (90.4 km^{2})
  - Water: 0.50 sq mi (1.3 km^{2})
- Elevation: 837 ft (255 m)

Population (2020)
  - Total: 1,057
  - Density: 30.3/sq mi (11.7/km^{2})
- Time zone: UTC-6 (Central (CST))
  - Summer (DST): UTC-5 (CDT)
- Area code: 920
- FIPS code: 55-48400
- GNIS feature ID: 1583633

Manchester is a town in Green Lake County, Wisconsin, United States. The population was 1,057 at the 2020 census. The unincorporated community of Manchester is located in the town.

== Geography ==
According to the United States Census Bureau, the town has a total area of 35.4 square miles (91.6 km^{2}), of which 34.9 square miles (90.4 km^{2}) is land and 0.5 square mile (1.3 km^{2}) (1.38%) is water.

== Demographics ==
As of the census of 2000, there were 848 people, 289 households, and 228 families residing in the town. The population density was 24.3 people per square mile (9.4/km^{2}). There were 312 housing units at an average density of 8.9 per square mile (3.5/km^{2}). The racial makeup of the town was 99.76% White, 0.12% from other races, and 0.12% from two or more races. Hispanic or Latino of any race were 0.47% of the population.

There were 289 households, out of which 38.8% had children under the age of 18 living with them, 68.5% were married couples living together, 4.5% had a female householder with no husband present, and 21.1% were non-families. 18.0% of all households were made up of individuals, and 9.0% had someone living alone who was 65 years of age or older. The average household size was 2.93 and the average family size was 3.37.

In the town, the population was spread out, with 33.4% under the age of 18, 7.1% from 18 to 24, 26.9% from 25 to 44, 20.8% from 45 to 64, and 11.9% who were 65 years of age or older. The median age was 33 years. For every 100 females, there were 100.0 males. For every 100 females age 18 and over, there were 108.5 males.

The median income for a household in the town was $42,375, and the median income for a family was $49,688. Males had a median income of $32,368 versus $21,786 for females. The per capita income for the town was $15,771. About 6.9% of families and 12.0% of the population were below the poverty line, including 18.0% of those under age 18 and 6.4% of those age 65 or over.

== Religion ==
St. Paul's Lutheran Church is a Christian church of the Wisconsin Evangelical Lutheran Synod in Manchester.

== Notable people ==
- Alex McDonald, Wisconsin State Representative and businessman, was born in the town
