= Dalton, Wisconsin =

Census-designated place in Wisconsin, United States

- Census-designated place
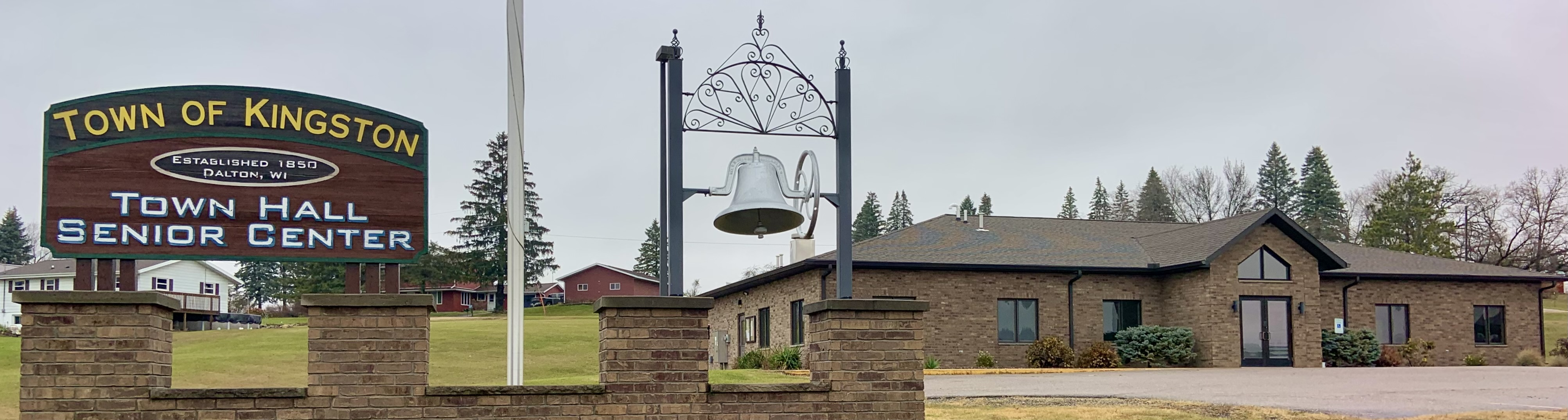
- Kingston Town Hall in Dalton

- Location within Wisconsin Location within the United States
- Coordinates: 43°39′25″N 89°12′23″W
- Country: United States
- State: Wisconsin
- County: Green Lake
- Town: Kingston

Area
  - Total: 0.456 sq mi (1.18 km^{2})
  - Land: 0.449 sq mi (1.16 km^{2})
  - Water: 0.007 sq mi (0.018 km^{2})
- Elevation: 869 ft (265 m)

Population (2020)
  - Total: 215
  - Density: 479/sq mi (185/km^{2})
- Time zone: UTC-6 (Central (CST))
  - Summer (DST): UTC-5 (CDT)
- Area code: 920
- GNIS feature ID: 1563680

Dalton is an unincorporated census-designated place in the town of Kingston located in the southwestern corner of Green Lake County, Wisconsin, United States. It is located on Wisconsin Highway 44 and uses ZIP code 53926. As of the 2020 census, its population was 215, up from 206 at the 2010 census. The surrounding countryside is mainly occupied by dairy farmers and an Amish community.

== Geography ==
Dalton has an area of 0.456 square miles (1.18 km^{2}); 0.449 square miles (1.16 km^{2}) of this is land, and 0.007 square miles (0.018 km^{2}) is water. Dalton was named for John Dalton, who emigrated from Ireland with his family in the early 1850s.

== Climate ==
According to the Köppen Climate Classification system, Dalton has a warm-summer humid continental climate, abbreviated "Dfb" on climate maps. The hottest temperature recorded in Dalton was 104 °F (40.0 °C) on July 7, 2007, while the coldest temperature recorded was −39 °F (−39.4 °C) on January 30, 1951.

Climate data for Dalton, Wisconsin, 1991–2020 normals, extremes 1944–2007
Month	Jan	Feb	Mar	Apr	May	Jun	Jul	Aug	Sep	Oct	Nov	Dec	Year
Record high °F (°C)	57 (14)	63 (17)	83 (28)	91 (33)	97 (36)	102 (39)	104 (40)	103 (39)	99 (37)	91 (33)	76 (24)	65 (18)	104 (40)
Mean maximum °F (°C)	44.4 (6.9)	50.0 (10.0)	67.7 (19.8)	77.9 (25.5)	85.3 (29.6)	91.5 (33.1)	93.0 (33.9)	91.1 (32.8)	86.6 (30.3)	78.1 (25.6)	62.9 (17.2)	48.1 (8.9)	95.0 (35.0)
Mean daily maximum °F (°C)	27.6 (−2.4)	31.8 (−0.1)	44.7 (7.1)	58.3 (14.6)	70.2 (21.2)	79.9 (26.6)	83.6 (28.7)	81.8 (27.7)	74.7 (23.7)	61.4 (16.3)	46.1 (7.8)	32.9 (0.5)	57.8 (14.3)
Daily mean °F (°C)	18.2 (−7.7)	21.1 (−6.1)	33.3 (0.7)	46.2 (7.9)	58.1 (14.5)	68.1 (20.1)	71.9 (22.2)	70.0 (21.1)	62.1 (16.7)	49.8 (9.9)	36.0 (2.2)	24.4 (−4.2)	46.6 (8.1)
Mean daily minimum °F (°C)	8.8 (−12.9)	10.5 (−11.9)	22.0 (−5.6)	34.1 (1.2)	45.9 (7.7)	56.4 (13.6)	60.1 (15.6)	58.2 (14.6)	49.4 (9.7)	38.1 (3.4)	26.0 (−3.3)	16.0 (−8.9)	35.5 (1.9)
Mean minimum °F (°C)	−16.4 (−26.9)	−11.0 (−23.9)	1.2 (−17.1)	16.6 (−8.6)	29.5 (−1.4)	39.0 (3.9)	46.3 (7.9)	43.7 (6.5)	31.6 (−0.2)	22.0 (−5.6)	6.5 (−14.2)	−9.7 (−23.2)	−19.8 (−28.8)
Record low °F (°C)	−39 (−39)	−34 (−37)	−27 (−33)	1 (−17)	22 (−6)	30 (−1)	35 (2)	33 (1)	20 (−7)	11 (−12)	−14 (−26)	−28 (−33)	−39 (−39)
Average precipitation inches (mm)	1.53 (39)	1.34 (34)	1.98 (50)	3.30 (84)	4.11 (104)	5.23 (133)	4.38 (111)	3.72 (94)	3.69 (94)	3.14 (80)	2.18 (55)	1.77 (45)	36.37 (923)
Average snowfall inches (cm)	14.6 (37)	8.8 (22)	7.3 (19)	3.2 (8.1)	0.0 (0.0)	0.0 (0.0)	0.0 (0.0)	0.0 (0.0)	0.0 (0.0)	0.7 (1.8)	3.8 (9.7)	7.1 (18)	45.5 (115.6)
Average extreme snow depth inches (cm)	9.6 (24)	9.4 (24)	6.1 (15)	1.8 (4.6)	0.0 (0.0)	0.0 (0.0)	0.0 (0.0)	0.0 (0.0)	0.0 (0.0)	0.2 (0.51)	2.7 (6.9)	6.3 (16)	13.1 (33)
Average precipitation days (≥ 0.01 in)	8.9	6.8	8.9	10.9	12.8	11.4	10.9	10.3	10.0	10.0	9.0	7.4	117.3
Average snowy days (≥ 0.1 in)	6.6	4.5	3.8	1.7	0.1	0.0	0.0	0.0	0.0	0.3	2.0	5.2	24.2
Source: NOAA (mean maxima/minima, snow depth 1971–2000)

== Education ==
The community is served by the Markesan School District.
