= Marquette (town), Wisconsin =

Marquette, Wisconsin
- Town
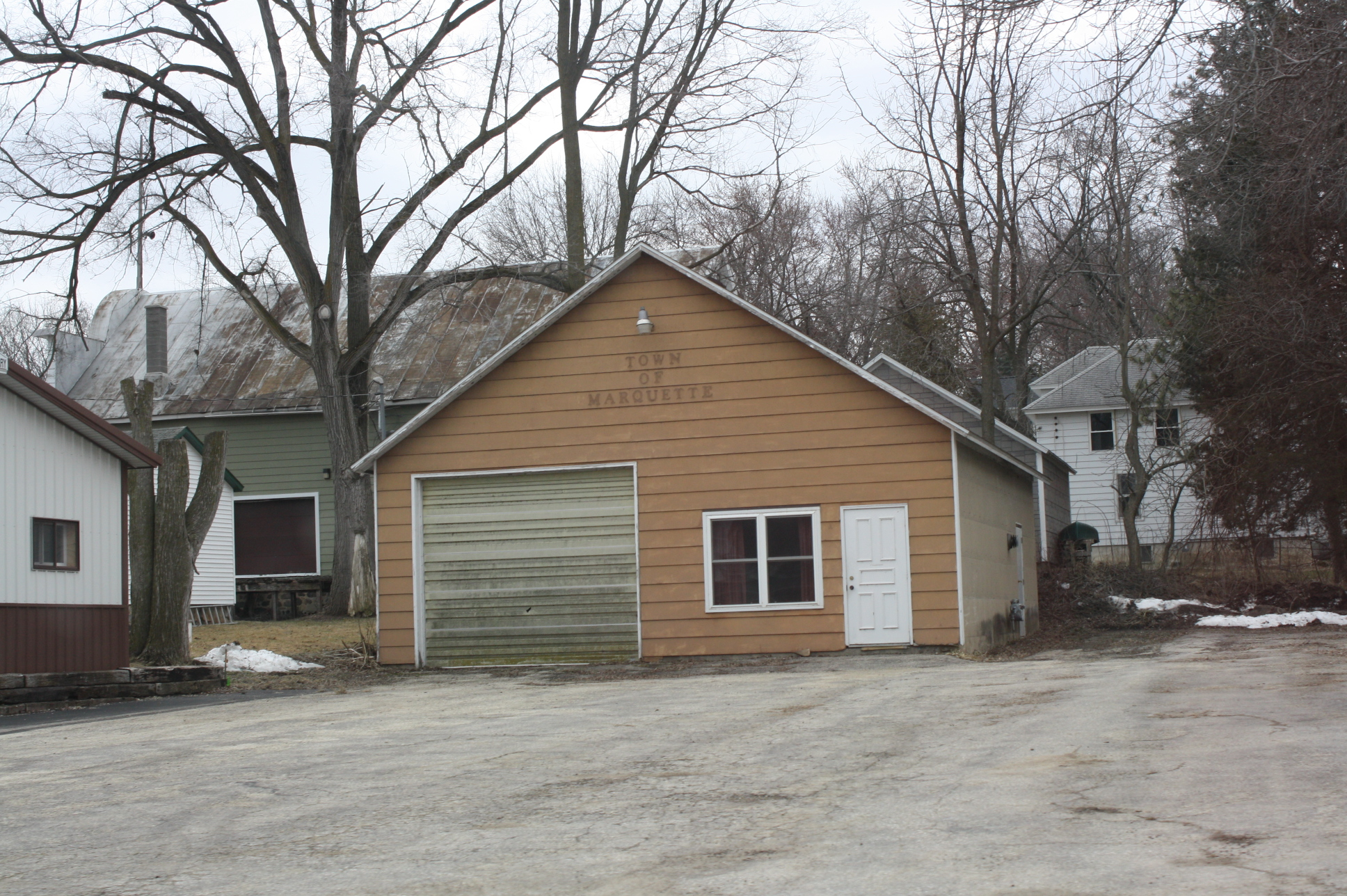
- Town hall

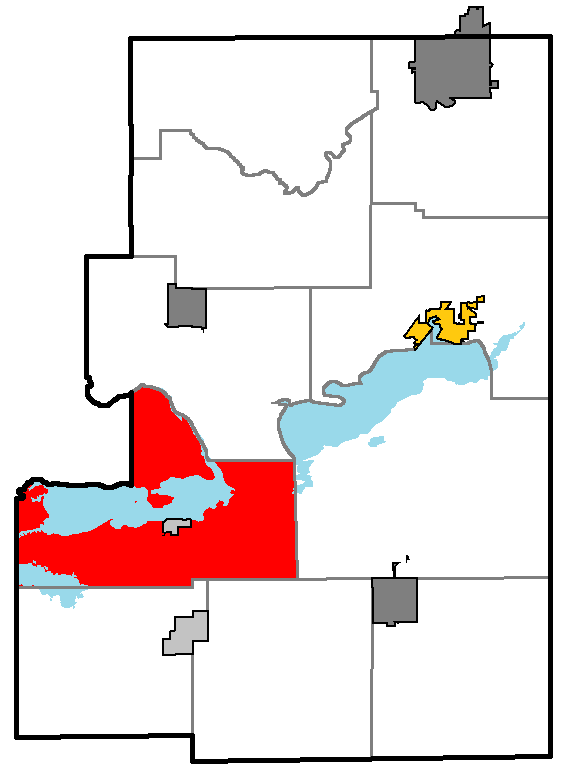
- Location of Marquette, Wisconsin

- Location of Green Lake County, Wisconsin
- Coordinates: 43°44′32″N 89°8′45″W
- Country: United States
- State: Wisconsin
- County: Green Lake

Area
  - Total: 40.43 sq mi (104.7 km^{2})
  - Land: 30.34 sq mi (78.6 km^{2})
  - Water: 10.09 sq mi (26.1 km^{2})
- Elevation: 797 ft (243 m)

Population (2020)
  - Total: 523
  - Density: 17.2/sq mi (6.66/km^{2})
- Time zone: UTC-6 (Central (CST))
  - Summer (DST): UTC-5 (CDT)
- ZIP: 53947
- Area code: 920

Marquette is a town in Green Lake County, Wisconsin, United States. The population was 523 at the 2020 census. The Village of Marquette is located within the town.

== Geography ==
According to the United States Census Bureau, the town has a total area of 40.6 square miles (105.2 km^{2}), of which 30.8 square miles (79.7 km^{2}) is land and 9.9 square miles (25.5 km^{2}) (24.27%) is water.

== Demographics ==
As of the census of 2000, there were 481 people, 197 households, and 127 families residing in the town. The population density was 15.6 people per square mile (6.0/km^{2}). There were 372 housing units at an average density of 12.1 per square mile (4.7/km^{2}). The racial makeup of the town was 98.34% White, 0.21% Black or African American, 0.42% Native American, 1.04% from other races. 1.87% of the population were Hispanic or Latino of any race.

There were 197 households, out of which 28.9% had children under the age of 18 living with them, 53.8% were married couples living together, 5.6% had a female householder with no husband present, and 35.5% were non-families. 29.4% of all households were made up of individuals, and 13.2% had someone living alone who was 65 years of age or older. The average household size was 2.44 and the average family size was 3.06.

In the town, the population was spread out, with 23.1% under the age of 18, 8.5% from 18 to 24, 26.8% from 25 to 44, 24.3% from 45 to 64, and 17.3% who were 65 years of age or older. The median age was 39 years. For every 100 females, there were 95.5 males. For every 100 females age 18 and over, there were 94.7 males.

The median income for a household in the town was $39,018, and the median income for a family was $45,357. Males had a median income of $31,944 versus $21,538 for females. The per capita income for the town was $17,537. About 5.3% of families and 5.7% of the population were below the poverty line, including 7.8% of those under age 18 and 2.6% of those age 65 or over.

== Religion ==
St. Paul's Lutheran Church is a Christian church of the Wisconsin Evangelical Lutheran Synod in Marquette.
