= Berlin (town), Green Lake County, Wisconsin =

Berlin, Wisconsin
- Town
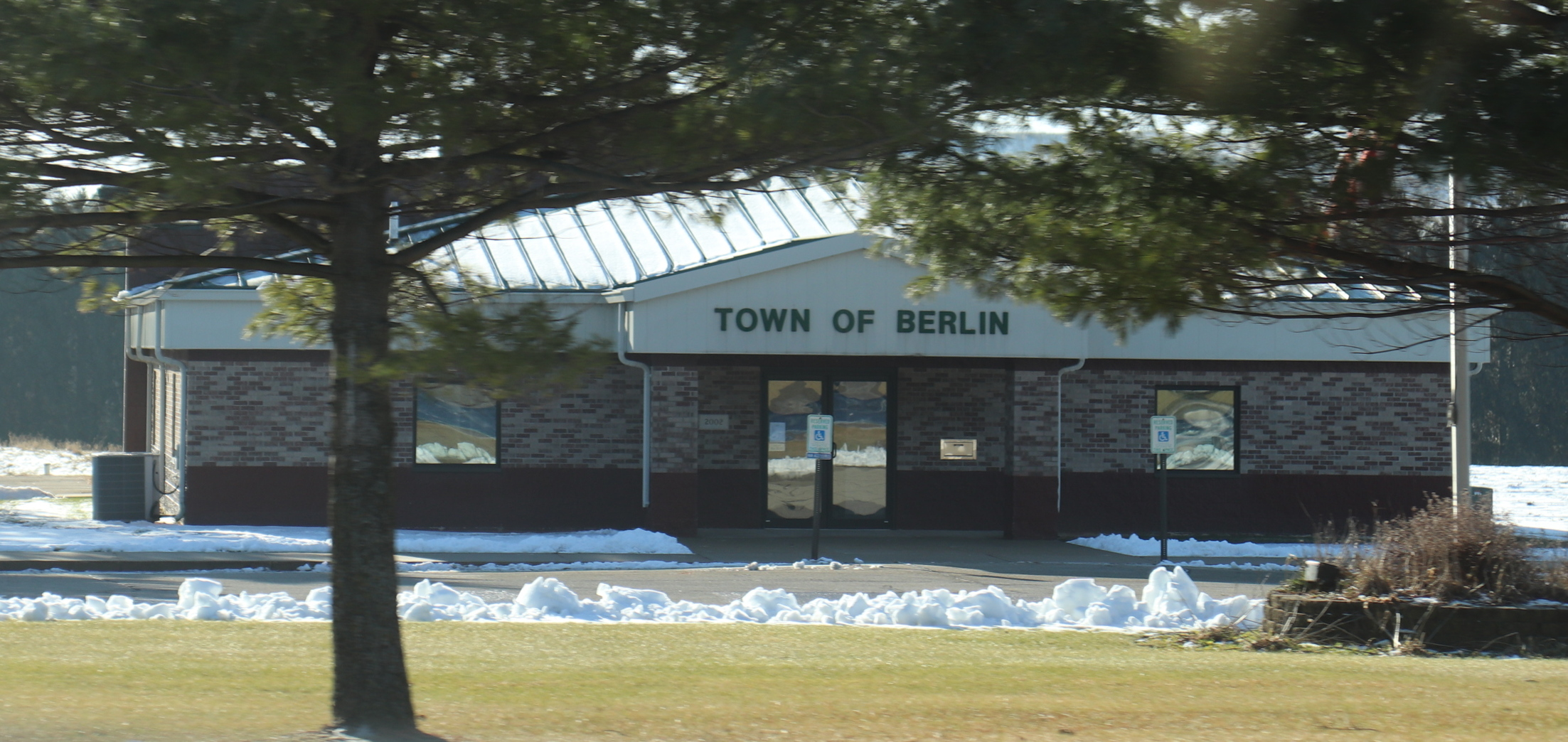
- Town hall

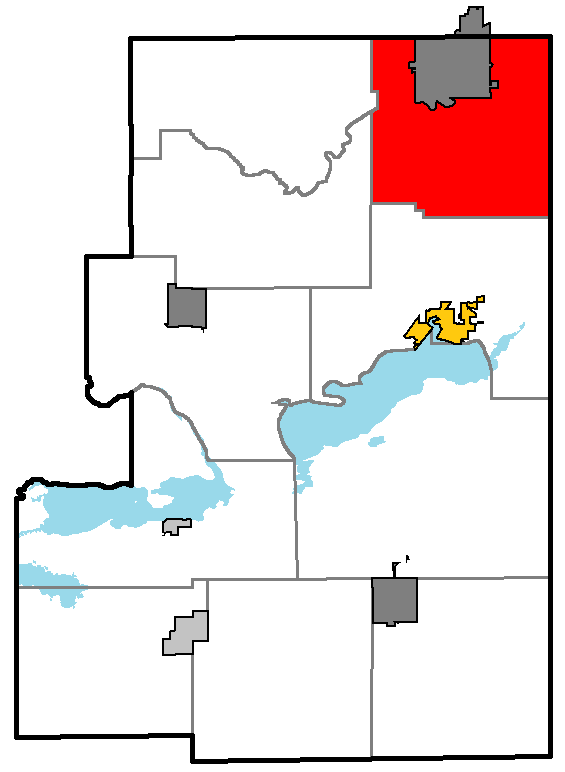
- Location of Berlin, Wisconsin

- Location of Green Lake County, Wisconsin
- Coordinates: 43°56′39″N 88°56′30″W
- Country: United States
- State: Wisconsin
- County: Green Lake

Area
  - Total: 30.0 sq mi (77.6 km^{2})
  - Land: 29.7 sq mi (76.8 km^{2})
  - Water: 0.31 sq mi (0.8 km^{2})
- Elevation: 909 ft (277 m)

Population (2020)
  - Total: 1,068
  - Density: 36.0/sq mi (13.9/km^{2})
- Time zone: UTC-6 (Central (CST))
  - Summer (DST): UTC-5 (CDT)
- Area code: 920
- FIPS code: 55-06950
- GNIS feature ID: 1582800

Berlin is a town in Green Lake County, Wisconsin, United States. The population was 1,068 at the 2020 census. The City of Berlin is located mostly within the town.

== Geography ==
According to the United States Census Bureau, the town has a total area of 30.0 square miles (77.6 km^{2}), of which 29.6 square miles (76.8 km^{2}) is land and 0.3 square mile (0.8 km^{2}) (1.07%) is water.

== Demographics ==
As of the census of 2000, there were 5,524 people, 423 households, and 343 families residing in the town. The population density was 38.6 people per square mile (14.9/km^{2}). There were 434 housing units at an average density of 14.6 per square mile (5.7/km^{2}). The racial makeup of the town was 98.08% White, 0.26% Native American, 0.70% Asian, 0.52% from other races, and 0.44% from two or more races. Hispanic or Latino of any race were 1.40% of the population.

There were 423 households, out of which 36.6% had children under the age of 18 living with them, 71.6% were married couples living together, 5.4% had a female householder with no husband present, and 18.9% were non-families. 16.3% of all households were made up of individuals, and 8.3% had someone living alone who was 65 years of age or older. The average household size was 2.71 and the average family size was 3.04.

In the town, the population was spread out, with 27.0% under the age of 18, 5.9% from 18 to 24, 28.5% from 25 to 44, 23.6% from 45 to 64, and 15.0% who were 65 years of age or older. The median age was 40 years. For every 100 females, there were 97.4 males. For every 100 females age 18 and over, there were 101.0 males.

The median income for a household in the town was $44,659, and the median income for a family was $48,750. Males had a median income of $33,625 versus $21,528 for females. The per capita income for the town was $18,767. About 3.0% of families and 5.9% of the population were below the poverty line, including 10.6% of those under age 18 and 6.5% of those age 65 or over.
