= Markesan, Wisconsin =

- City
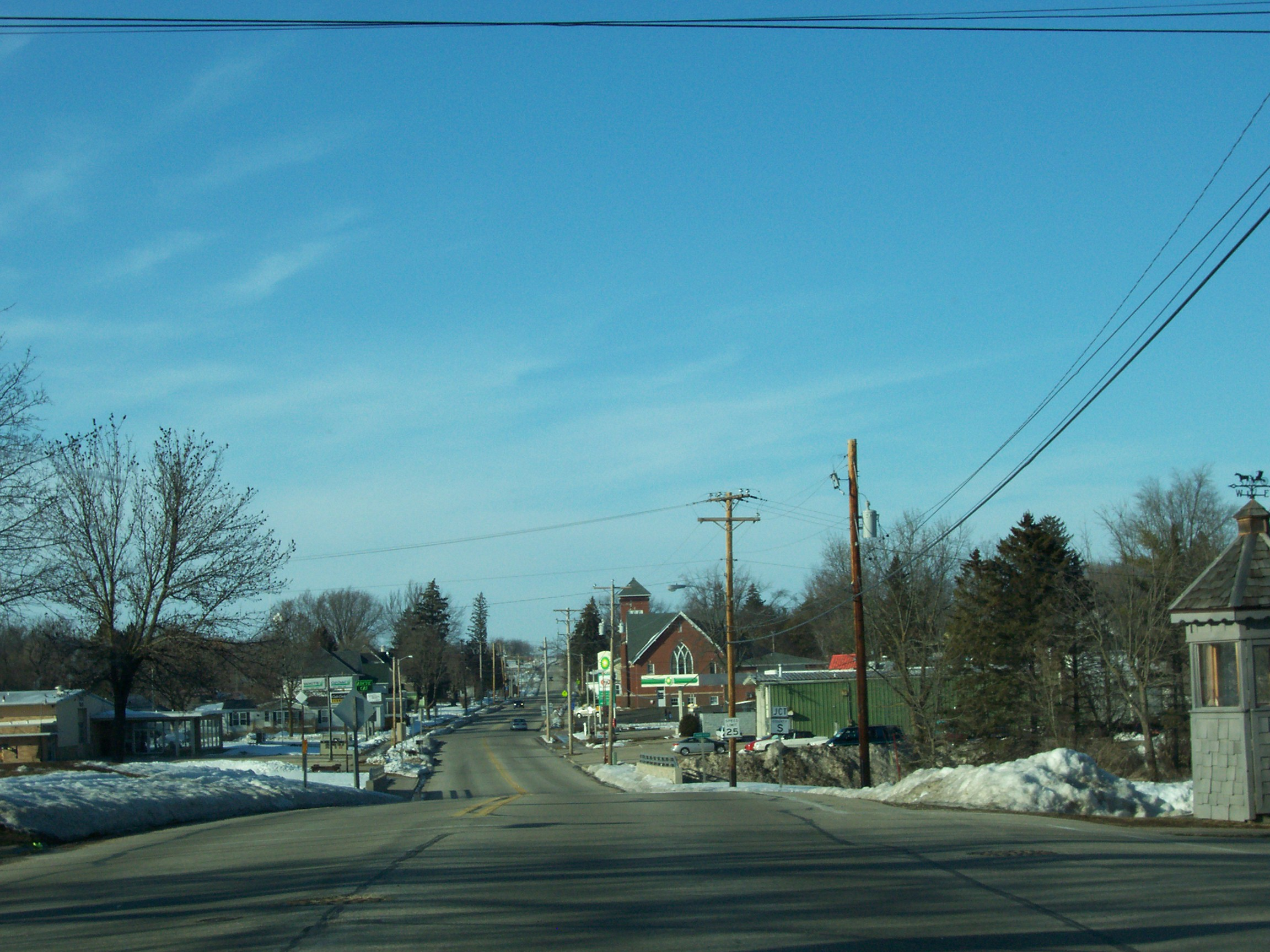
- Looking north at Markesan

- Location of Markesan in Green Lake County, Wisconsin.

- Location within Wisconsin Location within the United States
- Coordinates: 43°42′21″N 88°59′18″W
- Country: United States
- State: Wisconsin
- County: Green Lake

Area
  - Total: 2.34 sq mi (6.06 km^{2})
  - Land: 2.32 sq mi (6.02 km^{2})
  - Water: 0.019 sq mi (0.05 km^{2})
- Elevation: 850 ft (260 m)

Population (2020)
  - Total: 1,377
  - Density: 592/sq mi (229/km^{2})
- Time zone: UTC-6 (Central (CST))
  - Summer (DST): UTC-5 (CDT)
- Postal code: 53946
- Area code: 920
- FIPS code: 55-49450
- GNIS feature ID: 1569051
- Website: www.markesanwi.gov

Markesan is a city in Green Lake County, Wisconsin, United States. The population was 1,377 at the 2020 census. The center of population of Wisconsin is located in Markesan.

== Geography ==
According to the United States Census Bureau, the city has a total area of 2.36 square miles (6.11 km^{2}), of which 2.34 square miles (6.06 km^{2}) is land and 0.02 square miles (0.05 km^{2}) is water.

== Demographics ==
Historical population
Census	Pop.	Note	%±
1880	361		—
1890	475		31.6%
1900	706		48.6%
1910	802		13.6%
1920	959		19.6%
1930	872		−9.1%
1940	912		4.6%
1950	1,010		10.7%
1960	1,060		5.0%
1970	1,285		21.2%
1980	1,446		12.5%
1990	1,496		3.5%
2000	1,396		−6.7%
2010	1,476		5.7%
2020	1,377		−6.7%
U.S. Decennial Census

=== 2010 census ===
As of the census of 2010, there were 1,476 people, 589 households, and 383 families living in the city. The population density was 630.8 inhabitants per square mile (243.6/km^{2}). There were 661 housing units at an average density of 282.5 per square mile (109.1/km^{2}). The racial makeup of the city was 98.1% White, 0.3% African American, 0.1% Native American, 1.0% from other races, and 0.5% from two or more races. Hispanic or Latino of any race were 7.4% of the population.

There were 589 households, of which 32.9% had children under the age of 18 living with them, 50.1% were married couples living together, 10.2% had a female householder with no husband present, 4.8% had a male householder with no wife present, and 35.0% were non-families. 32.6% of all households were made up of individuals, and 19.6% had someone living alone who was 65 years of age or older. The average household size was 2.34 and the average family size was 2.97.

The median age in the city was 42.3 years. 24.7% of residents were under the age of 18; 6.5% were between the ages of 18 and 24; 22.2% were from 25 to 44; 21.3% were from 45 to 64; and 25.4% were 65 years of age or older. The gender makeup of the city was 45.6% male and 54.4% female.

=== 2000 census ===
As of the census of 2000, there were 1,396 people, 590 households, and 379 families living in the city. The population density was 592.0 people per square mile (228.4/km^{2}). There were 627 housing units at an average density of 265.9 per square mile (102.6/km^{2}). The racial makeup of the city was 98.28% White, 0.14% Pacific Islander, 1.15% from other races, and 0.43% from two or more races. Hispanic or Latino of any race were 3.15% of the population.

There were 590 households, out of which 30.8% had children under the age of 18 living with them, 54.6% were married couples living together, 6.3% had a female householder with no husband present, and 35.6% were non-families. 32.7% of all households were made up of individuals, and 19.5% had someone living alone who was 65 years of age or older. The average household size was 2.34 and the average family size was 2.98.

In the city, the population was spread out, with 24.6% under the age of 18, 7.7% from 18 to 24, 26.8% from 25 to 44, 20.8% from 45 to 64, and 20.1% who were 65 years of age or older. The median age was 39 years. For every 100 females, there were 94.7 males. For every 100 females age 18 and over, there were 91.1 males.

The median income for a household in the city was $38,472, and the median income for a family was $47,574. Males had a median income of $33,750 versus $21,343 for females. The per capita income for the city was $18,774. About 1.3% of families and 4.0% of the population were below the poverty line, including 4.6% of those under age 18 and 8.0% of those age 65 or over.

== Education ==
It is in the Markesan School District.

Markesan School District consists of Markesan Elementary, Middle and High Schools.

== Notable people ==
- Samuel Barter, Wisconsin State Representative, lived in Markesan
- Delphine Hanna, physical education professor at Oberlin College, born in Markesan
- Barbara Harris, Tony Award-winning actress, buried in Markesan
- Harry P. Ilsley, Chief Justice of the Wyoming Supreme Court, born in Markesan
- Frank Luptow, race car driver, born in Markesan
- Arthur Frank Mathews, painter, born in Markesan
- Alex McDonald, Wisconsin State Representative, lived in Markesan
- Archibald Nichols, Wisconsin State Representative, was Chairman of the Markesan Board of Supervisors
- William Paddock, Wisconsin State Representative, lived in Markesan
- Ira W. Parker, Wisconsin State Representative, lived in Markesan
- Charles H. Smith, Wisconsin state legislator, lived in Markesan
