= Green Lake County, Wisconsin =

County in Wisconsin, United States

- County
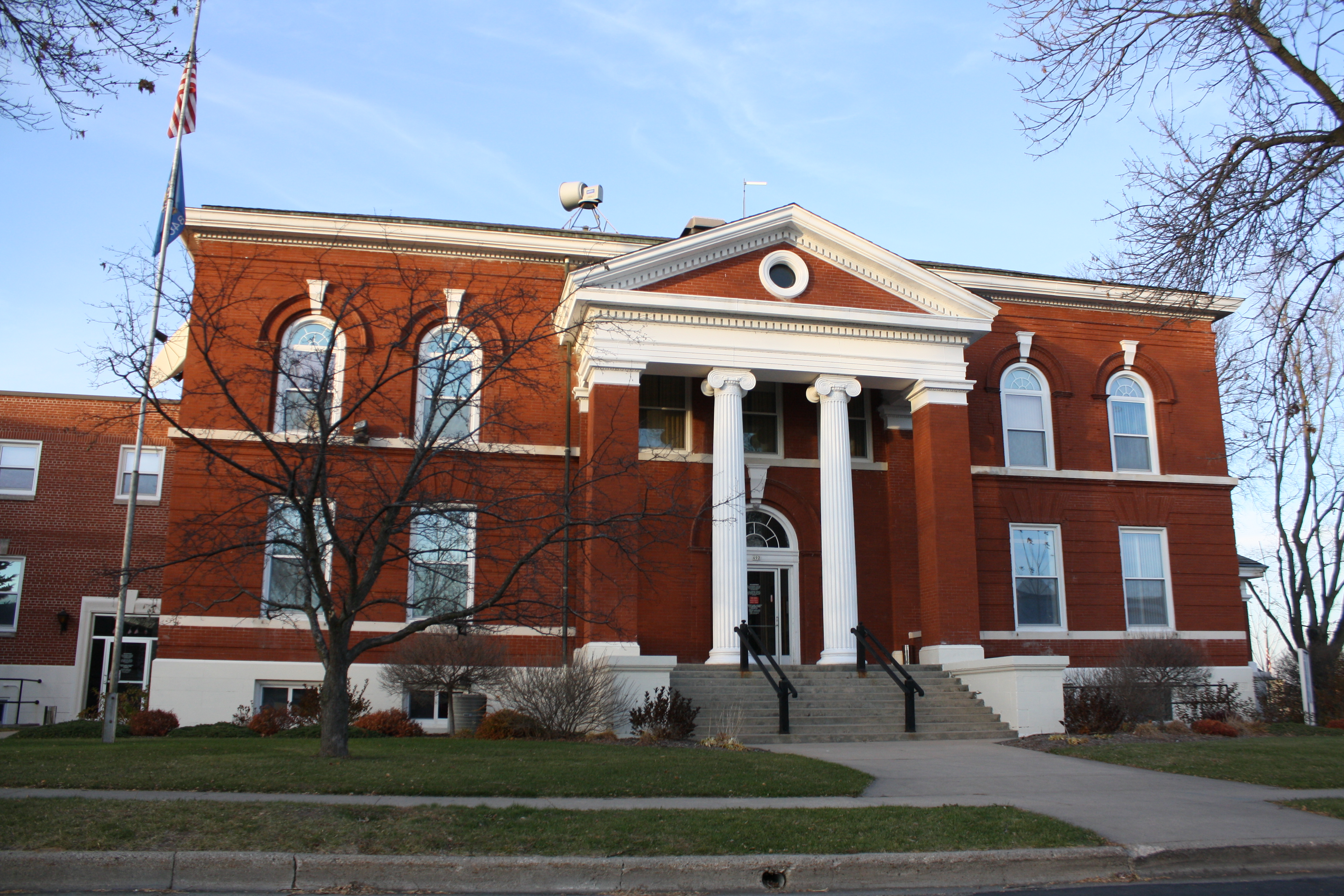
- Old Green Lake County Courthouse

- Location within the U.S. state of Wisconsin
- Coordinates: 43°49′N 89°02′W
- Country: United States
- State: Wisconsin
- Founded: 1858
- Named for: Green Lake
- Seat: Green Lake
- Largest city: Berlin

Area
  - Total: 380 sq mi (980 km^{2})
  - Land: 349 sq mi (900 km^{2})
  - Water: 31 sq mi (80 km^{2}) 8.1%

Population (2020)
  - Total: 19,018
  - Estimate (2025): 19,305 ▲
  - Density: 55.5/sq mi (21.4/km^{2})
- Time zone: UTC−6 (Central)
  - Summer (DST): UTC−5 (CDT)
- Congressional district: 6th
- Website: www.greenlakecountywi.gov

Green Lake County is a county located in the U.S. state of Wisconsin. As of the 2020 census, the population was 19,018. Its county seat is Green Lake. In 2020, the center of population of Wisconsin was located in Green Lake County, near the city of Markesan.

== Geography ==
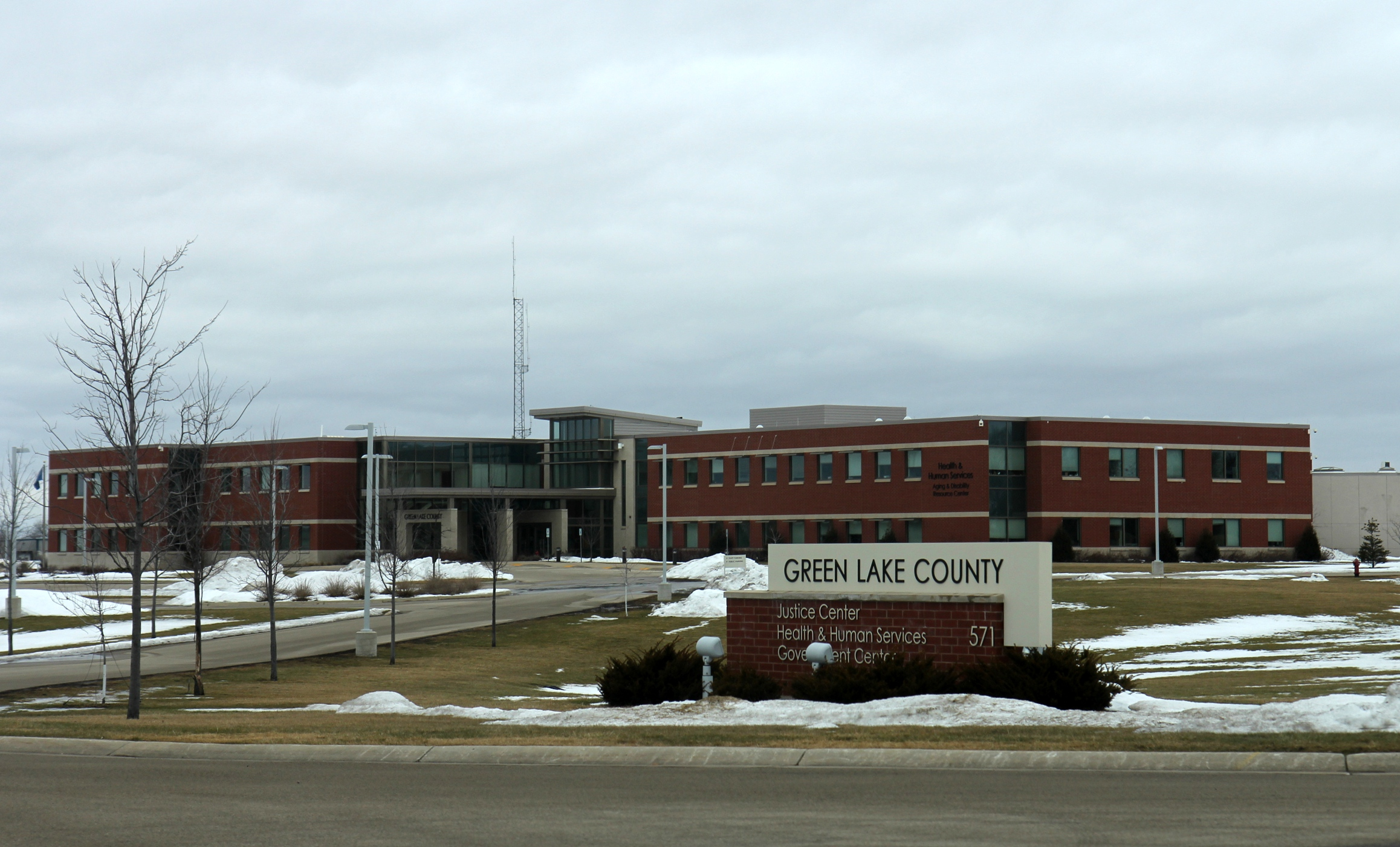
Government Center

According to the U.S. Census Bureau, the county has a total area of 380 square miles (980 km^{2}), of which 349 square miles (900 km^{2}) are land and 31 square miles (80 km^{2}) (8.1%) are covered by water. It is the third-smallest county in Wisconsin by total area.

=== Major highways ===
- Highway 23 (Wisconsin)
- Highway 44 (Wisconsin)
- Highway 49 (Wisconsin)
- Highway 73 (Wisconsin)
- Highway 91 (Wisconsin)

=== Railroads ===
- Union Pacific
- Wisconsin and Southern Railroad

=== Adjacent counties ===
- Waushara County – north
- Winnebago County – northeast
- Fond du Lac County – east
- Dodge County – southeast
- Columbia County – southwest
- Marquette County – west

== Demographics ==
Historical population
Census	Pop.	Note	%±
1860	12,663		—
1870	13,195		4.2%
1880	14,483		9.8%
1890	15,163		4.7%
1900	15,797		4.2%
1910	15,491		−1.9%
1920	14,875		−4.0%
1930	13,913		−6.5%
1940	14,092		1.3%
1950	14,749		4.7%
1960	15,418		4.5%
1970	16,878		9.5%
1980	18,370		8.8%
1990	18,651		1.5%
2000	19,105		2.4%
2010	19,051		−0.3%
2020	19,018		−0.2%
2025 (est.)	19,305	▲	1.5%
U.S. Decennial Census; 1790–1960 1900–90; 1990–00 2010 2020 2025

=== Racial and ethnic composition ===
Green Lake County, Wisconsin – Racial and ethnic composition Note: the US Census treats Hispanic/Latino as an ethnic category. This table excludes Latinos from the racial categories and assigns them to a separate category. Hispanics/Latinos may be of any race.
Race / Ethnicity (NH = Non-Hispanic)	Pop 1980	Pop 1990	Pop 2000	Pop 2010	Pop 2020	% 1980	% 1990	% 2000	% 2010	% 2020
White alone (NH)	18,117	18,291	18,474	17,990	17,255	98.62%	98.07%	96.70%	94.43%	90.73%
Black or African American alone (NH)	14	21	29	79	106	0.08%	0.11%	0.15%	0.41%	0.56%
Native American or Alaska Native alone (NH)	22	38	36	46	49	0.12%	0.20%	0.19%	0.24%	0.26%
Asian alone (NH)	23	103	56	85	101	0.13%	0.55%	0.29%	0.45%	0.53%
Native Hawaiian or Pacific Islander alone (NH)	x	x	6	5	0	x	x	0.03%	0.03%	0.00%
Other race alone (NH)	0	6	7	6	39	0.00%	0.03%	0.04%	0.03%	0.21%
Mixed race or Multiracial (NH)	x	x	104	97	489	x	x	0.54%	0.51%	2.57%
Hispanic or Latino (any race)	194	192	393	743	979	1.06%	1.03%	2.06%	3.90%	5.15%
Total	18,370	18,651	19,105	19,051	19,018	100.00%	100.00%	100.00%	100.00%	100.00%

=== 2020 census ===
As of the 2020 census, the population was 19,018, with a population density of 54.4 people per square mile (21.0 people/km^{2}). There were 10,671 housing units at an average density of 30.5 units per square mile (11.8 units/km^{2}).

The median age was 46.6 years, with 21.1% of residents under the age of 18 and 23.6% aged 65 years or older; for every 100 females there were 100.8 males, and for every 100 females age 18 and over there were 100.5 males age 18 and over.

The racial makeup of the county was 92.0% White, 0.6% Black or African American, 0.4% American Indian and Alaska Native, 0.5% Asian, 0.1% Native Hawaiian and Pacific Islander, 2.1% from some other race, and 4.2% from two or more races, while Hispanic or Latino residents of any race comprised 5.1% of the population.

There were 8,099 households, of which 24.0% had children under the age of 18 living in them. Of all households, 50.4% were married-couple households, 19.8% were households with a male householder and no spouse or partner present, and 22.5% were households with a female householder and no spouse or partner present. About 30.6% of all households were made up of individuals and 15.1% had someone living alone who was 65 years of age or older. About 24.1% of housing units were vacant, with 76.3% of occupied units owner-occupied and 23.7% renter-occupied; the homeowner vacancy rate was 1.8% and the rental vacancy rate was 9.3%.

27.4% of residents lived in urban areas, while 72.6% lived in rural areas.

=== 2000 census ===
2000 Census Age Pyramid for Green Lake County.

As of the census of 2000, there were 19,105 people, 7,703 households, and 5,322 families residing in the county. The population density was 54 people per square mile (21 people/km^{2}). There were 9,831 housing units at an average density of 28 units per square mile (11 units/km^{2}). The racial makeup of the county was 97.81% White, 0.15% Black or African American, 0.20% Native American, 0.31% Asian, 0.04% Pacific Islander, 0.89% from other races, and 0.60% from two or more races. 2.06% of the population were Hispanic or Latino of any race. 51.8% were of German, 10.6% Polish, 5.8% Irish and 5.8% American ancestry. 94.2% spoke English, 3.0% Spanish and 1.8% German as their first language.

There were 7,703 households, out of which 29.40% had children under the age of 18 living with them, 58.50% were married couples living together, 6.90% had a female householder with no husband present, and 30.90% were non-families. 27.00% of all households were made up of individuals, and 13.80% had someone living alone who was 65 years of age or older. The average household size was 2.43 and the average family size was 2.96.

In the county, the population was spread out, with 24.20% under the age of 18, 6.60% from 18 to 24, 26.20% from 25 to 44, 24.20% from 45 to 64, and 18.80% who were 65 years of age or older. The median age was 41 years. For every 100 females there were 97.00 males. For every 100 females age 18 and over, there were 95.20 males.

=== Birth statistics ===
In 2017, there were 380 births, giving a general fertility rate of 61.6 births per 1000 women aged 15–44, the 32nd lowest rate out of all 72 Wisconsin counties. Of these, 77 of the births occurred at home, the fourth highest for Wisconsin counties. Additionally, there were 11 reported induced abortions performed on women of Green Lake County residence in 2017.

=== Religious membership ===
In 2010, the largest religious groups by number of adherents were Catholic at 5,290 adherents, Wisconsin Synod Lutheran at 2,498 adherents, Missouri Synod Lutheran at 1,173 adherents, ELCA Lutheran at 964 adherents, and Amish at 812 adherents.

== Communities ==
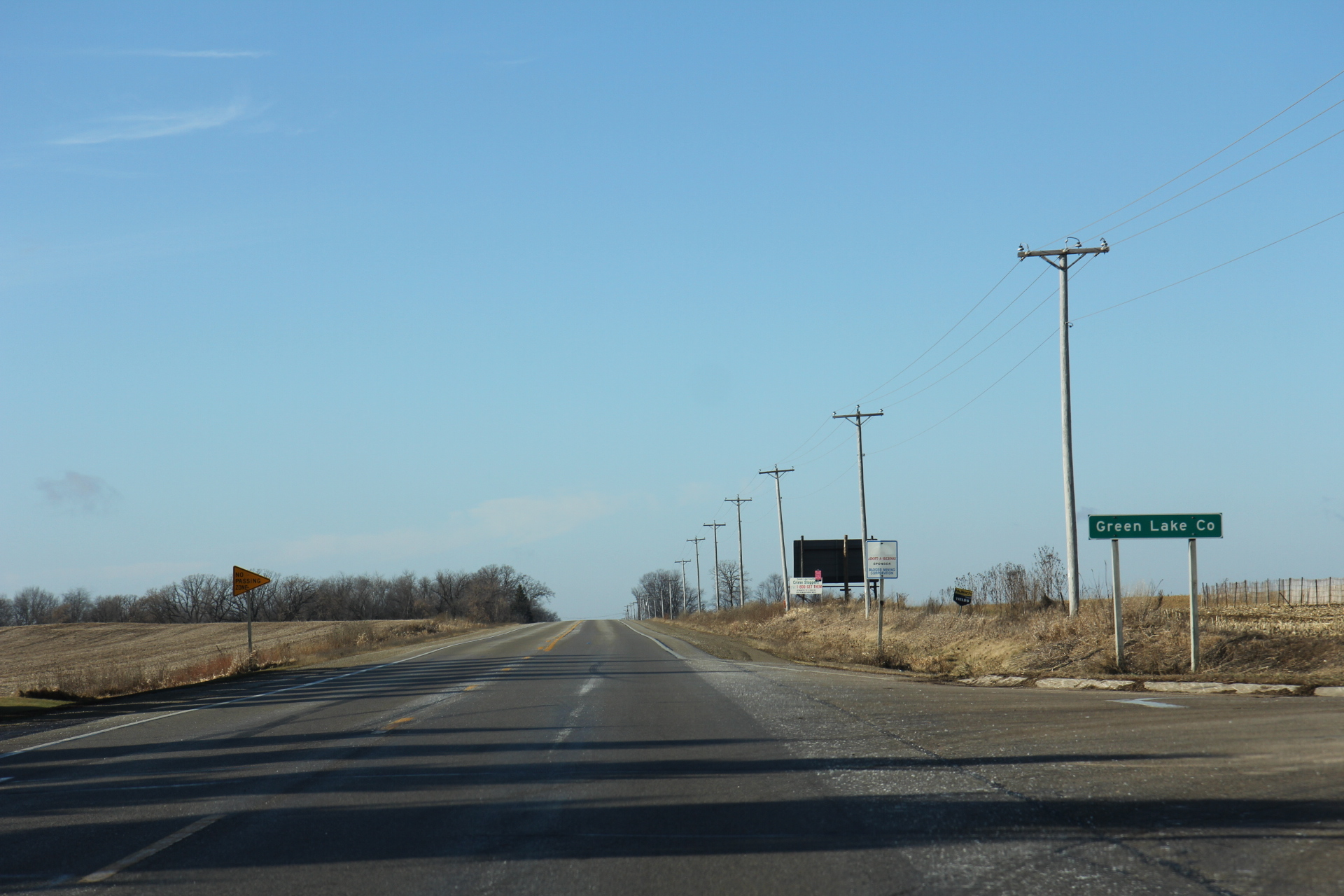
Welcome sign for Green Lake County on WIS 44

=== Cities ===
- Berlin (partly in Waushara County)
- Green Lake (county seat)
- Markesan
- Princeton

=== Villages ===
- Kingston
- Marquette

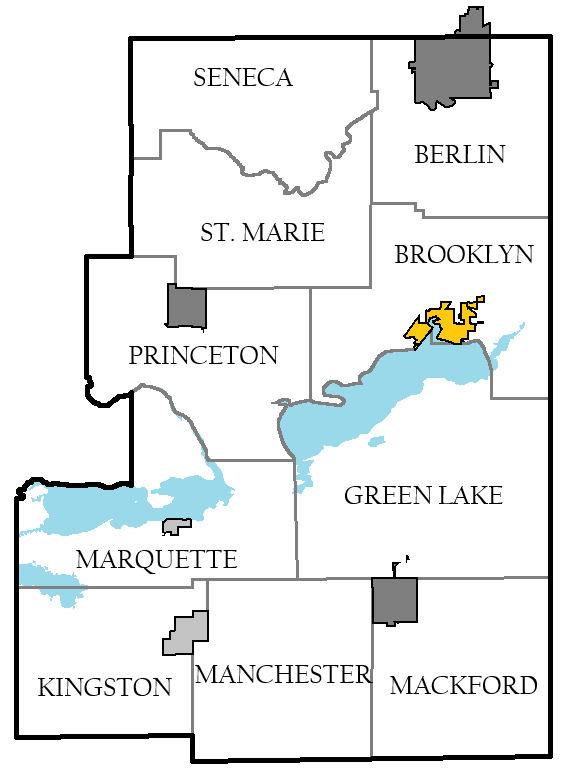
Towns of Green Lake County

=== Towns ===
- Berlin
- Brooklyn
- Green Lake
- Kingston
- Mackford
- Manchester
- Marquette
- Princeton
- Seneca
- St. Marie

=== Census-designated place ===
- Dalton

=== Unincorporated communities ===
- Manchester
- Sherwood Forest

== Politics ==
United States presidential election results for Green Lake County, Wisconsin
Year	Republican		Democratic		Third party(ies)	
Year	No.	%	No.	%	No.	%
1892	1,430	42.60%	1,810	53.92%	117	3.49%
1896	2,103	55.69%	1,568	41.53%	105	2.78%
1900	2,081	56.41%	1,522	41.26%	86	2.33%
1904	2,181	60.92%	1,269	35.45%	130	3.63%
1908	2,094	55.15%	1,608	42.35%	95	2.50%
1912	1,269	42.53%	1,407	47.15%	308	10.32%
1916	1,647	53.47%	1,352	43.90%	81	2.63%
1920	3,467	75.53%	890	19.39%	233	5.08%
1924	1,988	37.45%	1,090	20.53%	2,231	42.02%
1928	3,038	53.15%	2,622	45.87%	56	0.98%
1932	2,179	32.61%	4,446	66.53%	58	0.87%
1936	2,926	42.55%	3,840	55.84%	111	1.61%
1940	4,919	67.25%	2,357	32.23%	38	0.52%
1944	4,571	67.38%	2,190	32.28%	23	0.34%
1948	3,939	68.76%	1,722	30.06%	68	1.19%
1952	6,117	79.27%	1,590	20.60%	10	0.13%
1956	5,441	76.49%	1,643	23.10%	29	0.41%
1960	5,110	64.74%	2,776	35.17%	7	0.09%
1964	3,871	49.83%	3,893	50.12%	4	0.05%
1968	4,893	63.69%	2,299	29.92%	491	6.39%
1972	5,046	67.67%	2,174	29.15%	237	3.18%
1976	5,020	58.41%	3,411	39.69%	164	1.91%
1980	5,868	63.42%	2,851	30.81%	533	5.76%
1984	6,198	71.11%	2,441	28.01%	77	0.88%
1988	5,205	62.72%	3,033	36.55%	61	0.74%
1992	3,897	40.85%	2,772	29.06%	2,871	30.09%
1996	3,565	45.23%	3,152	39.99%	1,165	14.78%
2000	5,451	59.86%	3,301	36.25%	355	3.90%
2004	6,472	63.59%	3,605	35.42%	101	0.99%
2008	5,393	56.55%	4,000	41.95%	143	1.50%
2012	5,782	59.76%	3,793	39.20%	100	1.03%
2016	6,216	66.02%	2,693	28.60%	507	5.38%
2020	7,168	67.17%	3,344	31.34%	159	1.49%
2024	7,458	67.48%	3,449	31.21%	145	1.31%

Green Lake County has long been one of the most consistently Republican counties in Wisconsin. Since 1936, the county has only once voted Democratic, supporting Lyndon B. Johnson in his nationwide landslide of 1964, and even then, Johnson won by just 22 votes and 0.29% in the county.

== Infrastructure ==
=== Law Enforcement ===
The Green Lake County Jail is located in the county seat city, Green Lake.

== Education ==
School districts include:

- Berlin Area School District
- Cambria-Friesland School District
- Green Lake School District
- Markesan School District
- Montello School District
- Princeton School District
- Ripon Area School District

== See also ==
- National Register of Historic Places listings in Green Lake County, Wisconsin
