= Black River Falls, Wisconsin =

Black River Falls, Wisconsin Ho-Chunk: Nįoxawanį
- City
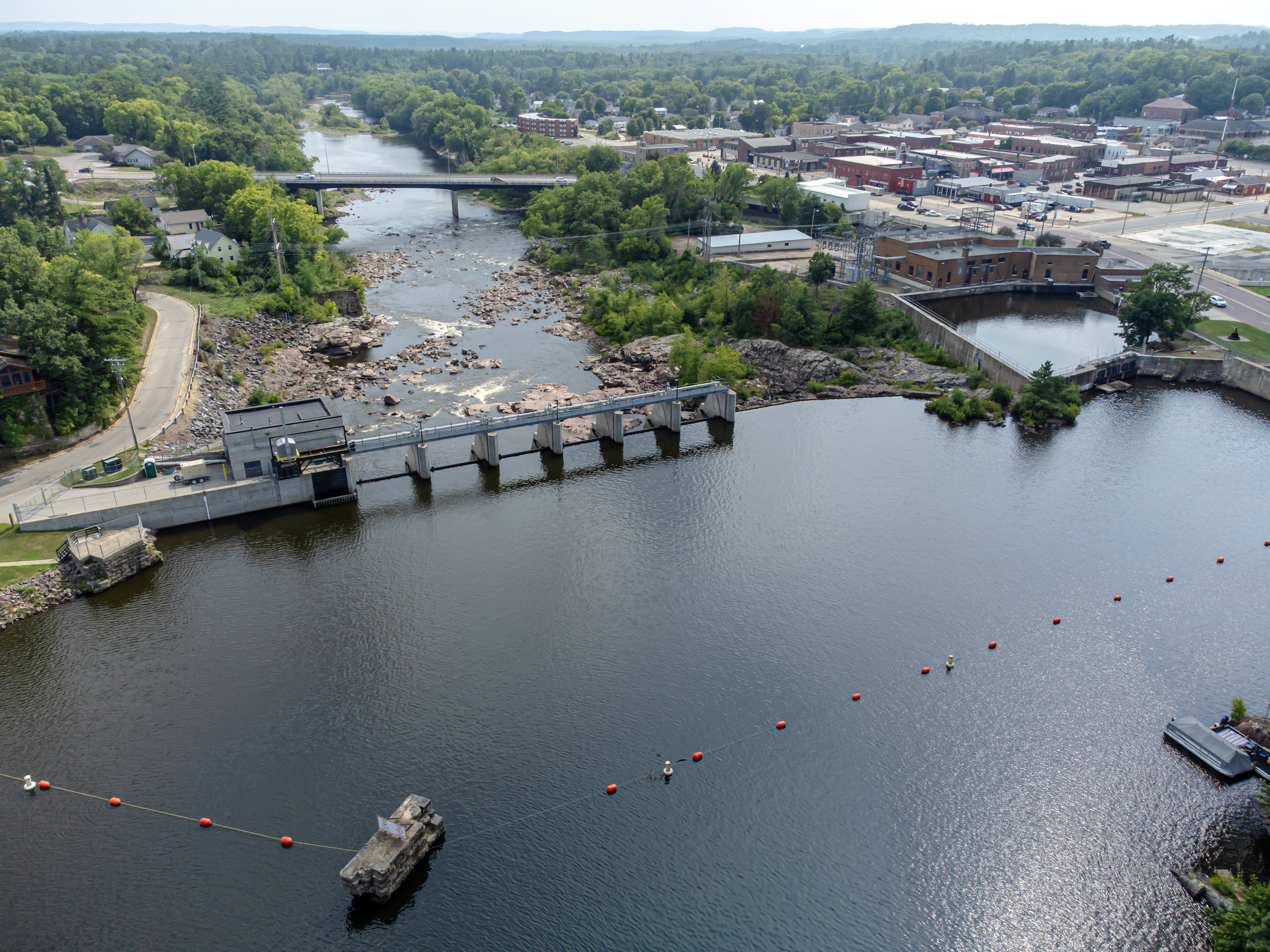
- Downtown and the Black River from the Black River Falls dam

- Location of Black River Falls in Jackson County, Wisconsin.

- Location within Wisconsin Location within the United States
- Coordinates: 44°17′50″N 90°50′57″W
- Country: United States
- State: Wisconsin
- County: Jackson

Area
  - Total: 4.23 sq mi (10.95 km^{2})
  - Land: 4.19 sq mi (10.84 km^{2})
  - Water: 0.039 sq mi (0.10 km^{2})
- Elevation: 794 ft (242 m)

Population (2020)
  - Total: 3,523
  - Density: 840/sq mi (325/km^{2})
- Time zone: UTC-6 (Central (CST))
  - Summer (DST): UTC-5 (CDT)
- ZIP codes: 54615
- Area codes: 715 & 534
- FIPS code: 55-07900
- GNIS feature ID: 1561883
- Website: blackriverfallswi.gov

Black River Falls is a city in Jackson County, Wisconsin, United States, and its county seat. The population was 3,523 at the 2020 census. It is located along the Black River and home to the headquarters of the Ho-Chunk Nation of Wisconsin.

== History ==
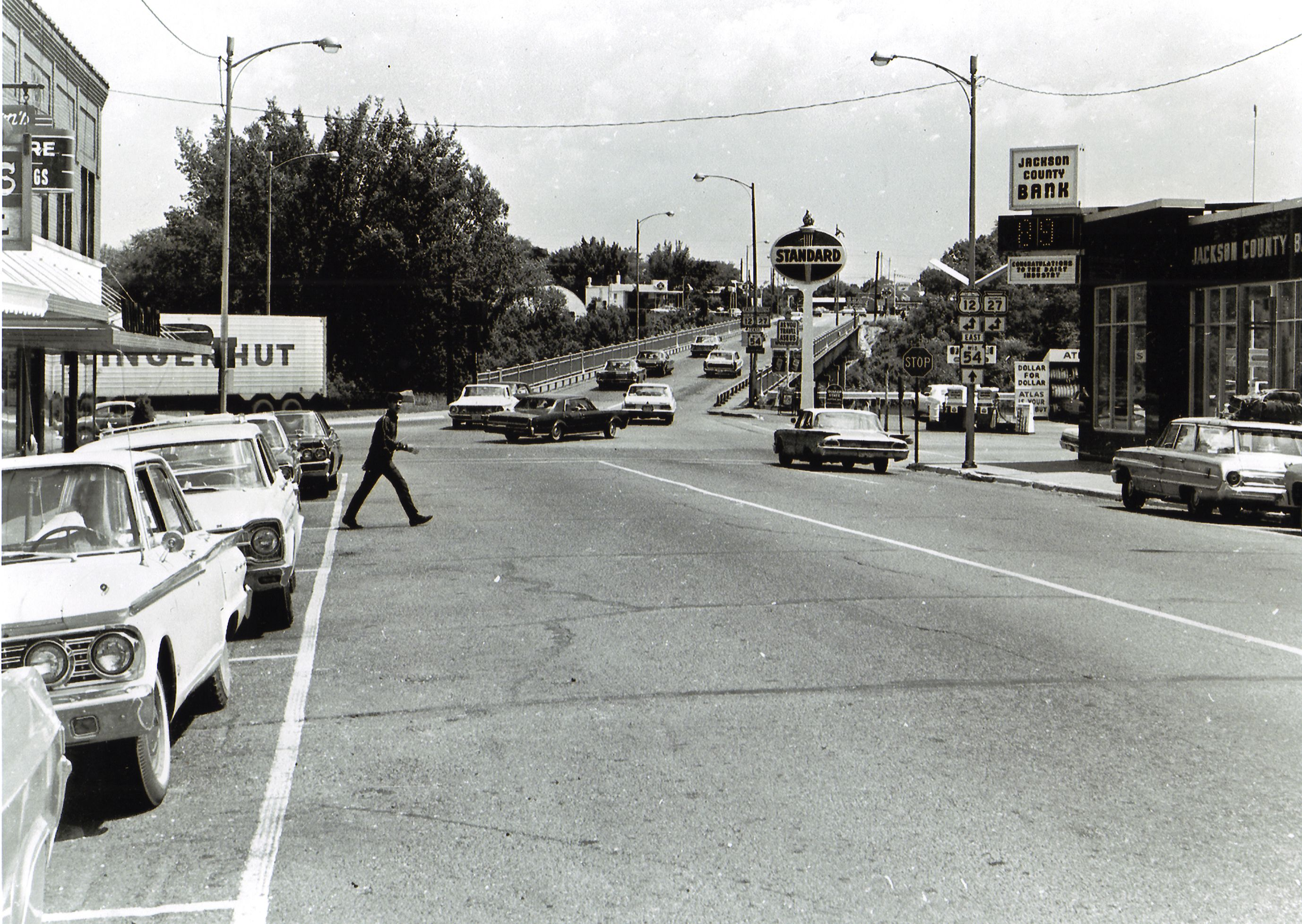
Intersection of U.S. Route 12/Wisconsin State Route 54 in downtown Black River Falls, bridge crossing the Black River in background (1967)

A large monument to Black River Falls' veterans of World War I, World War II, the Korean War, and the Vietnam War, as well as to local Medal of Honor recipient Mitchell Red Cloud, Jr., was erected near the Chamber of Commerce Building at 101 S. 2nd Street. Named the "Field of Honor", the attached plaques provide accounts of the veterans' services. This site is also the start of the four-mile (6.5 km) Foundation Trail, a signed hiking and bike path that circles the eastern part of the community.

Black River Falls is the focus of Michael Lesy's book Wisconsin Death Trip (1973), which used photographs and newspaper cuttings to highlight the harshness of life in the community during the late nineteenth century and the effects it had on the psychology of the inhabitants.

== Geography ==
Black River Falls was founded to utilize the waterpower of the Black River. As the area was predominantly forest at the time, its primary use was in operating sawmills.

Black River Falls is located at 44°17′50″N 90°50′57″W (44.297166, -90.849263). According to the United States Census Bureau, the city has a total area of 4.20 square miles (10.88 km^{2}), of which 4.10 square miles (10.62 km^{2}) is land and 0.10 square miles (0.26 km^{2}) is water.

The city is located on the falls of the Black River at the northeast edge of the Driftless Area, where the river cuts through a region of granite. The falls are covered by a hydroelectric dam, forming the 200-acre (0.81 km^{2}) Black River Flowage.

== Demographics ==
Historical population
Census	Pop.	Note	%±
1860	570		—
1870	1,101		93.2%
1880	1,427		29.6%
1890	2,261		58.4%
1900	1,938		−14.3%
1910	1,917		−1.1%
1920	1,796		−6.3%
1930	1,950		8.6%
1940	2,539		30.2%
1950	2,824		11.2%
1960	3,195		13.1%
1970	3,273		2.4%
1980	3,434		4.9%
1990	3,490		1.6%
2000	3,618		3.7%
2010	3,622		0.1%
2020	3,523		−2.7%
U.S. Decennial Census

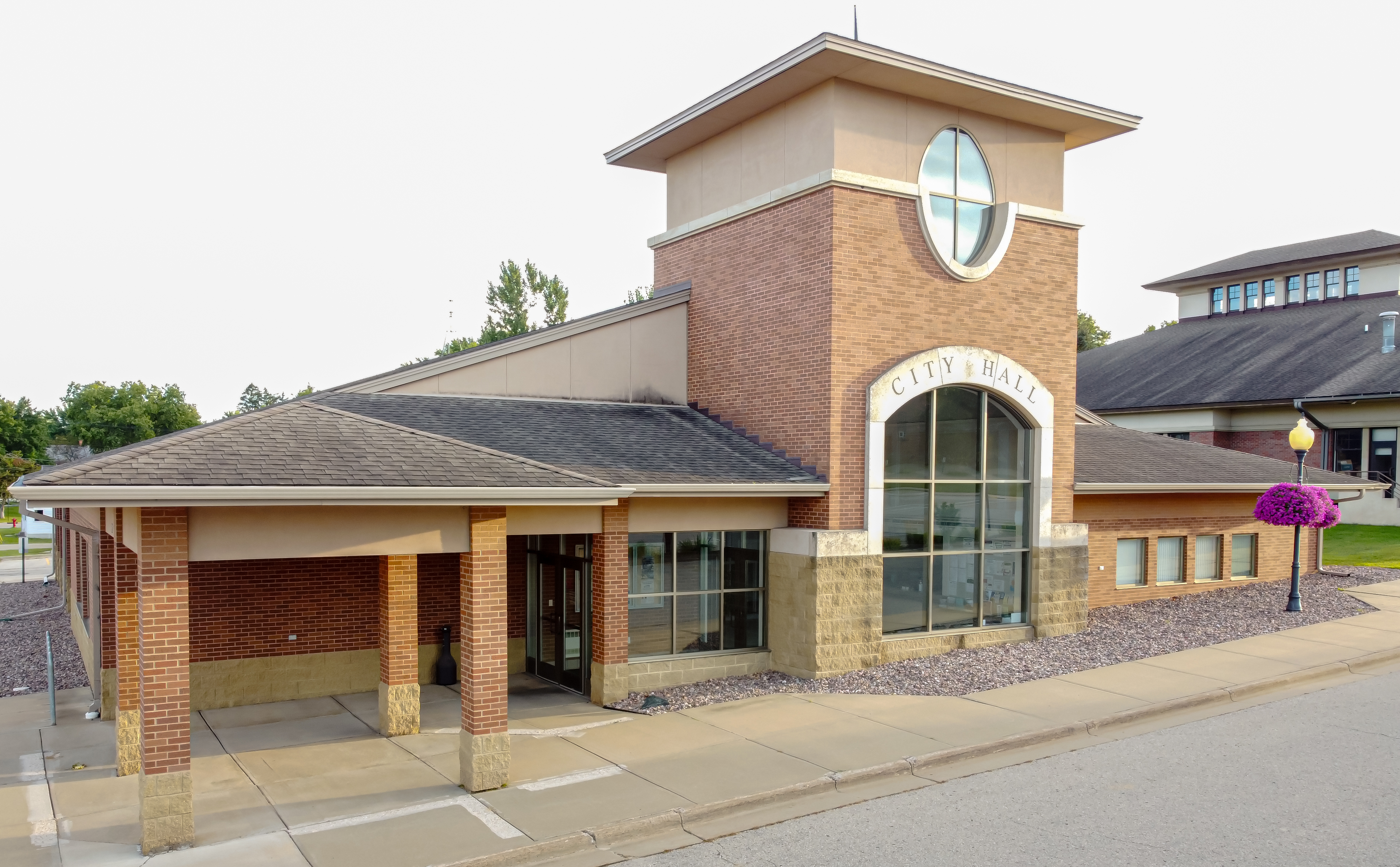
City Hall

=== 2020 census ===
As of the census of 2020, the population was 3,523. The population density was 841.8 inhabitants per square mile (325.0/km^{2}). There were 1,748 housing units at an average density of 417.7 units per square mile (161.3 units/km^{2}). The racial makeup of the city was 86.3% White, 6.0% Native American, 1.1% Black or African American, 0.3% Asian, 0.9% from other races, and 5.4% from two or more races. Ethnically, the population was 3.1% Hispanic or Latino of any race.

According to the American Community Survey estimates for 2016–2020, the median income for a household in the city was $39,155, and the median income for a family was $71,250. Male full-time workers had a median income of $38,682 versus $37,974 for female workers. The per capita income for the city was $28,050. About 9.6% of families and 15.0% of the population were below the poverty line, including 7.6% of those under age 18 and 13.4% of those age 65 or over. Of the population age 25 and over, 96.1% were high school graduates or higher and 20.7% had a bachelor's degree or higher.

=== 2010 census ===
As of the census of 2010, there were 3,622 people, 1,613 households, and 845 families residing in the city. The population density was 883.4 inhabitants per square mile (341.1/km^{2}). There were 1,732 housing units at an average density of 422.4 units per square mile (163.1 units/km^{2}). The racial makeup of the city was 91.5% White, 0.5% African American, 5.2% Native American, 0.3% Asian, 0.2% from other races, and 2.3% from two or more races. Hispanic or Latino of any race were 1.7% of the population.

There were 1,613 households, of which 26.2% had children under the age of 18 living with them, 36.7% were married couples living together, 11.7% had a female householder with no husband present, 4.0% had a male householder with no wife present, and 47.6% were non-families. 41.5% of all households were made up of individuals, and 17.4% had someone living alone who was 65 years of age or older. The average household size was 2.13 and the average family size was 2.89.

The median age in the city was 41.6 years. 22.8% of residents were under the age of 18; 6.8% were between the ages of 18 and 24; 24.4% were from 25 to 44; 24.7% were from 45 to 64; and 21.2% were 65 years of age or older. The gender makeup of the city was 48.4% male and 51.6% female.

=== 2000 census ===
As of the census of 2000, there were 3,618 people, 1,563 households, and 886 families residing in the city. The population density was 1,146.4 people per square mile (442.6 people/km^{2}). There were 1,679 housing units at an average density of 532.0 units per square mile (205.4 units/km^{2}). The racial makeup of the city was 93.37% White, 0.19% African American, 4.73% Native American, 0.11% Asian, 0.08% Pacific Islander, 0.55% from other races, and 0.97% from two or more races. Hispanic or Latino of any race were 1.16% of the population.

There were 1,563 households, out of which 25.8% had children under the age of 18 living with them, 43.4% were married couples living together, 10.2% had a female householder with no husband present, and 43.3% were non-families. 38.0% of all households were made up of individuals, and 19.6% had someone living alone who was 65 years of age or older. The average household size was 2.15 and the average family size was 2.82.

In the city, the population was spread out, with 20.8% under the age of 18, 8.9% from 18 to 24, 24.2% from 25 to 44, 21.3% from 45 to 64, and 24.8% who were 65 years of age or older. The median age was 42 years. For every 100 females, there were 87.1 males. For every 100 females age 18 and over, there were 81.3 males.

== Economy ==
While the logging and lumber industry is still present in the area, the current economy leans heavily on agriculture and tourism. Several locations support the tourism industry. Lake Arbutus, a 839-acre (3.40 km^{2}) impoundment of the river, lies several miles northeast, as does the multi-use Levis/Trow trail system. Black River Falls is home to a casino and hotel operated by the Ho-Chunk Nation. Much of the surrounding land is part of the Black River State Forest.

== Arts and culture ==
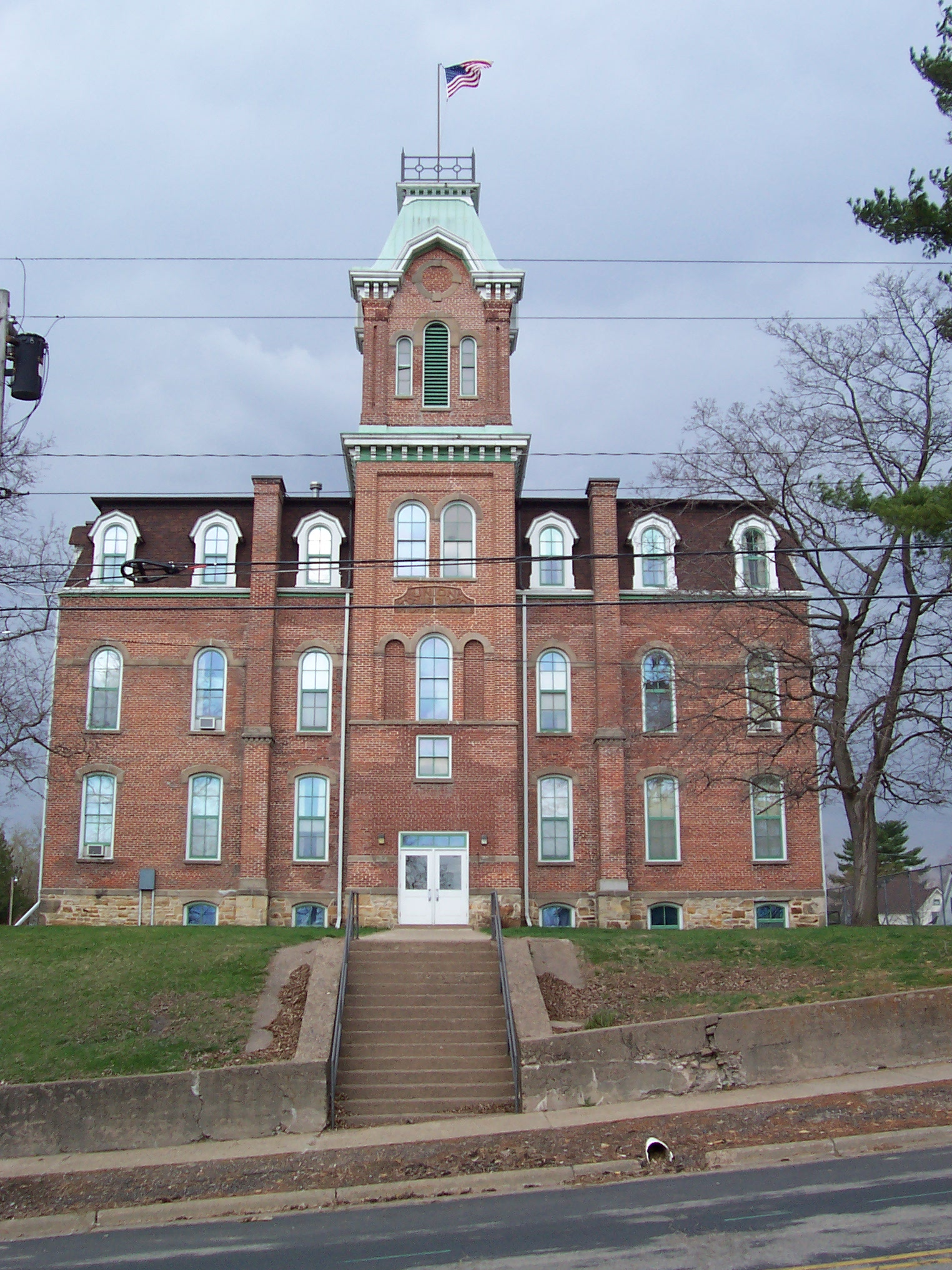
Union High School building

Black River Falls is the focus of Michael Lesy's book Wisconsin Death Trip (1973), which used photographs and newspaper cuttings to highlight the harshness of life in the community during the late nineteenth century and the effects it had on the psychology of the inhabitants. The book was made into a film in 1999, which included scenes from the community as it appeared then.

Lesy drew on the work of Charles Van Schaick, a photographer in Black River Falls between the 1870s and 1930s. Van Schaick made portraits of the Ho-Chunk (Winnebago) people in the area in his commercial studio in downtown Black River Falls. His photographs are now housed at the Wisconsin Historical Society and were the subject of a book, People of the Big Voice, published in 2011.

The Black River Falls area is home to a large population of the endangered Karner Blue butterfly. The city celebrates with the Karner Blue Butterfly Festival held annually on the third Saturday of July.

Union High School is listed on the National Register of Historic Places.

== Government ==
Black River Falls operates under a council–manager government. City Hall on Second Street houses the mayor, Jay Eddy; the city administrator, Brad Chown; deputy city clerks and treasurers; the Parks and Recreation Department and the Police Department. Black River Falls is the county seat of Jackson County, whose offices are located on Main Street.

== Education ==
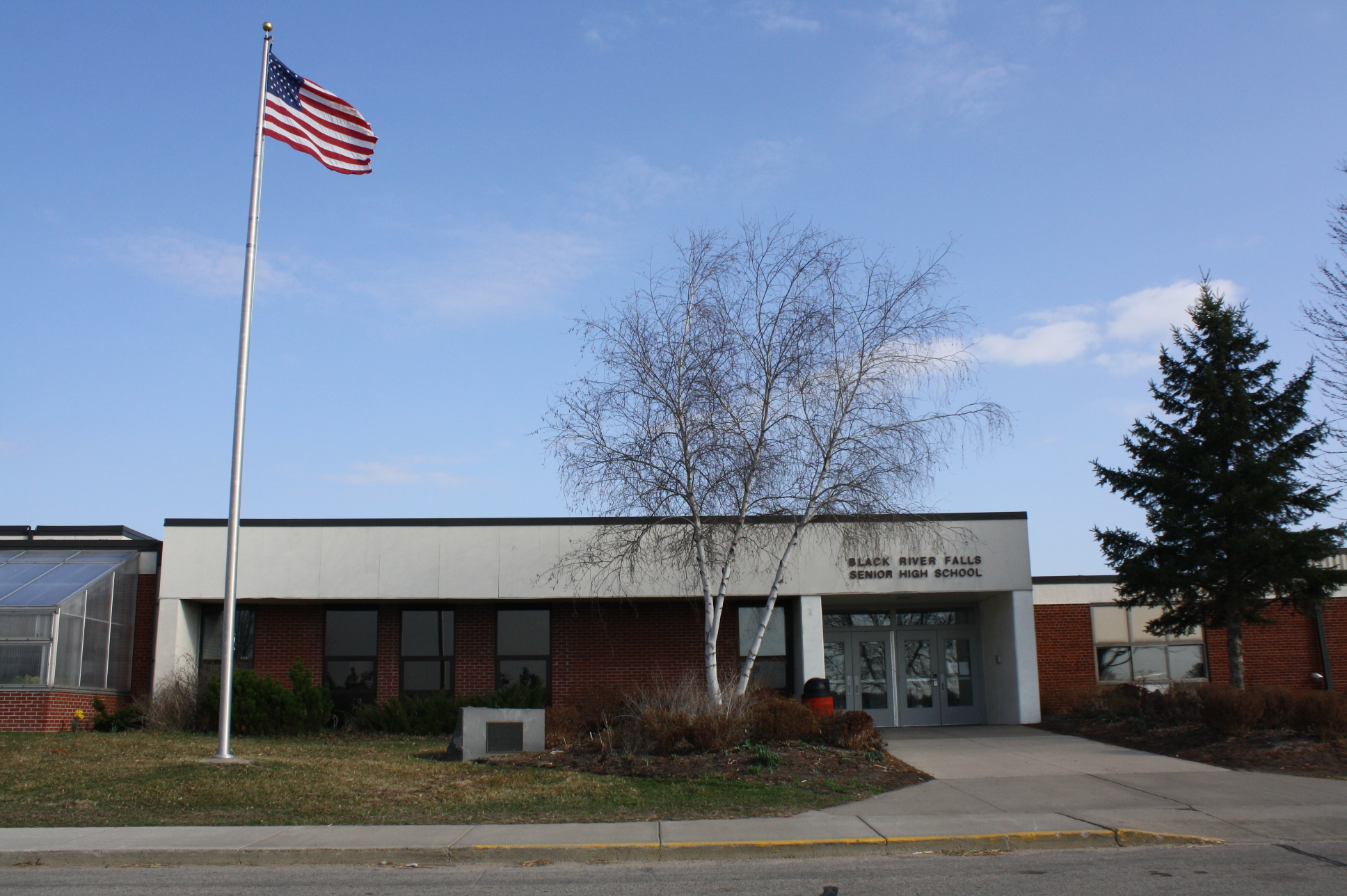
Black River Falls High School

Black River Falls High School, the city's public high school located on the southwestern edge of town, is administered by the Black River Falls School District. The former high school, in the center of the city, has been converted to apartments. Western Technical College offers classes in the city.

== Media ==
Black River Falls has one newspaper, The Banner Journal. The local radio stations are WWIS 99.7 FM and 1260 AM; and WXYM 96.1 FM.

== Transportation ==
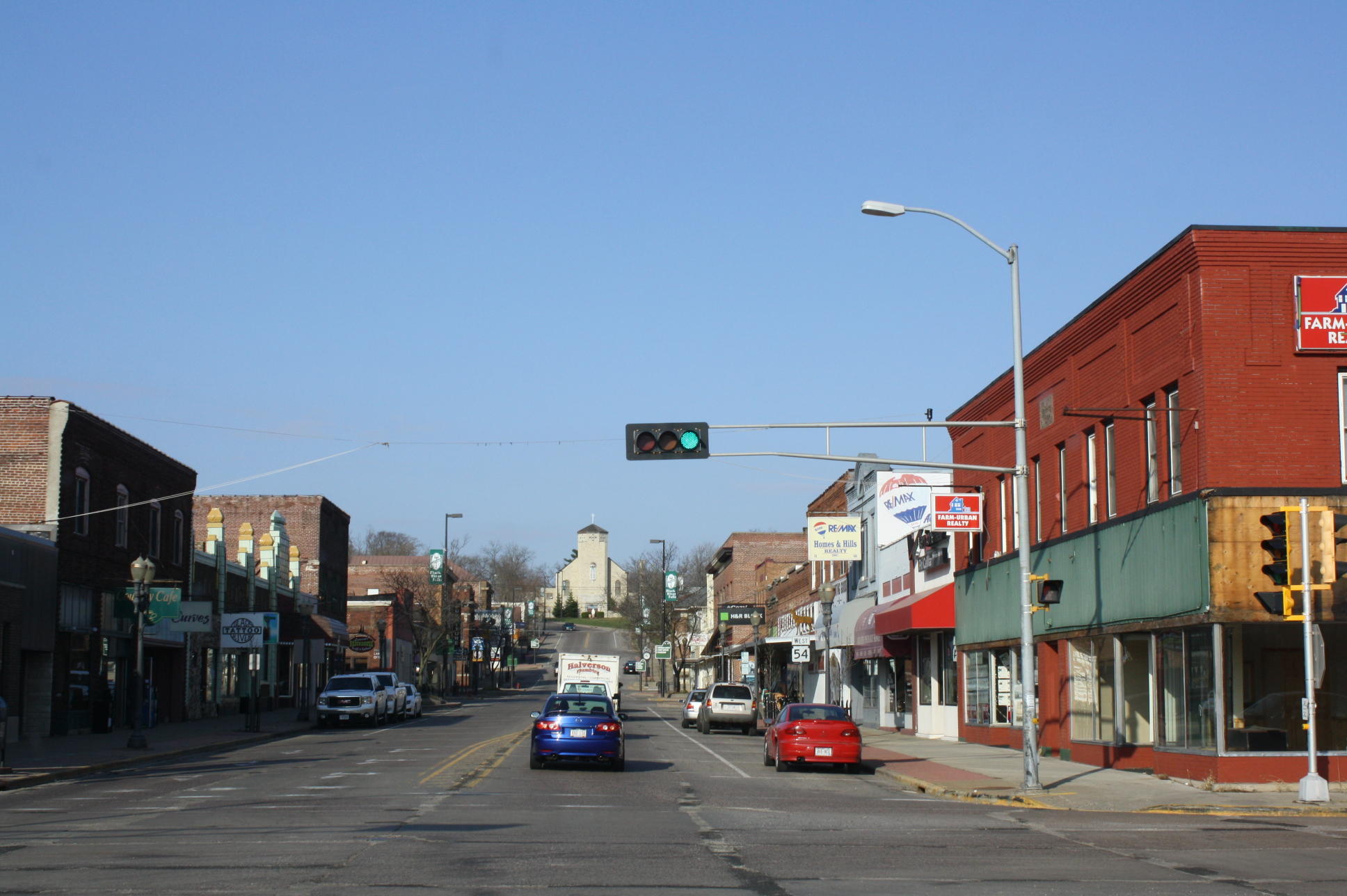
Looking west at downtown Black River Falls on WIS 54

The primary artery of transportation for Black River Falls is Interstate 94, which passes through the eastern edge of the city. US Highway 12, Wisconsin Highway 27 and Wisconsin Highway 54 also pass through the city.

Black River Falls Area Airport (KBCK) serves the city and surrounding communities.

The Union Pacific Railroad is adjacent to the city but does not pass through the center. Its predecessor, the Chicago and North Western Railway, formerly operated a branch line into the town to serve an iron ore mine.

Black River Falls Public Transit operates a dial-a-ride transit service in the city.

== Notable people ==
- Simon Benson, Oregon businessman
- Eustace L. Brockway, Wisconsin State Assembly
- David W. Cheney, Wisconsin State Assembly
- Larry D. Gilbertson, Wisconsin State Assembly
- Lawrence M. Hagen, Wisconsin State Assembly
- Phil Haugstad, baseball player
- Merlin Hull, U.S. Representative
- Calvin R. Johnson, Wisconsin State Assembly
- Lester Johnson, U.S. Representative
- Oswald H. Johnson, Wisconsin State Assembly
- Truman Lowe, Native American sculptor
- James J. McGillivray, Wisconsin State Assembly and Senate
- Hugh Brooks Mills, politician and businessman
- Terry Musser, Wisconsin State Assembly
- Merlin J. Peterson, Wisconsin State Assembly
- Carl C. Pope, Wisconsin legislator and jurist
- Hugh H. Price, U.S. Representative
- William T. Price, U.S. Representative
- Ernie Rudolph, MLB player
- Casper D. Waller, Wisconsin State Assembly
