= Mary Sweeny =

American vandal

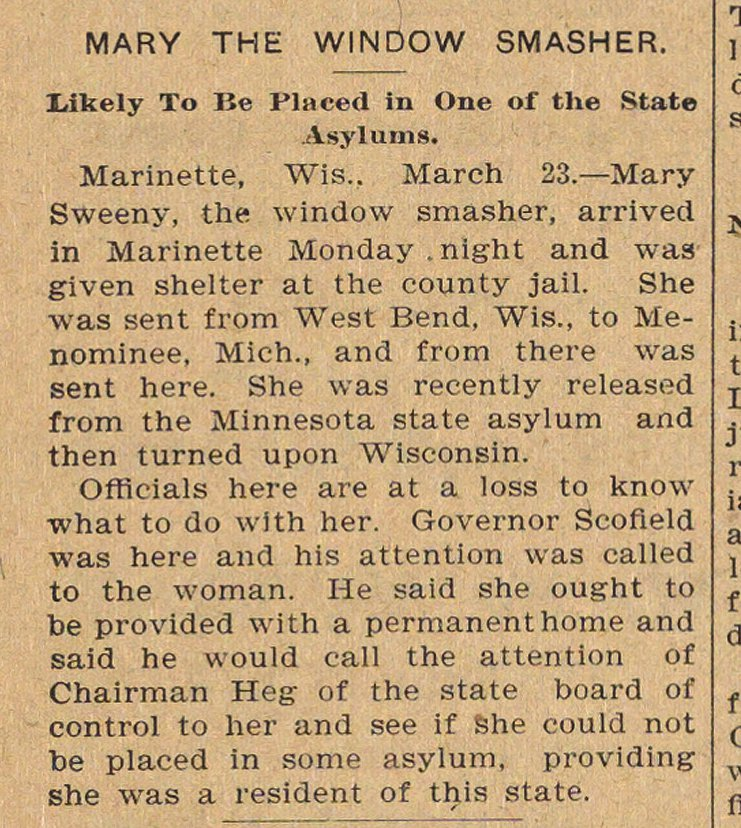
Mary Sweeny Newspaper Article - Ann Arbor Argus - March 26, 1897

Mary Sweeny, also known by the first names Maria, Marie, Marion, Mollie, Margaret, Harriet, Anna, Annie or Kit, and by the last names Sweeney, Ricks, Rix, Kelley, Beece, O'Brien, Haley and Anderson, was an American woman known as "the Window Smasher" because of her mania for breaking glass windows across Wisconsin and neighbouring states during the 1890s.

She achieved cultural notoriety in Michael Lesy's 1973 book Wisconsin Death Trip and later in James Marsh's docudrama of the same title. Mary Sweeny was portrayed in the film by actress Jo Vukelich.

== Life ==
Sweeny's name, date and place of birth are uncertain. According to some reports, she was born and lived in Saint Paul, Minnesota, while others state that she was born in Stevens Point, Wisconsin, circa 1858, 1859 or 1862. In 1882, she was reported to have stolen a dress from the woman she worked for, and by late 1885, she had already been committed to and released from a hospital for the insane. She claimed to be the wife of a St. Paul druggist named E.J. Ricks or E.J. Haley. She reportedly worked at one time as a teacher at Stevens Point, and was a great wife and mother of two. An injury to her brain caused her to change, as a result of which she ran away from home in about 1890, and traveled around northern Michigan, Wisconsin, Minnesota, Iowa, and Montana, breaking windows.

== Notoriety ==
One cause of her window breaking sprees was reported to be drinking; it was also noted that she was seeking vengeance against medical doctors. She is said to have used cocaine to self-medicate because "it quiets her nerves". She was quoted as liking "to hear the glass jingle". She broke windows of shops and trains using anything to hand, including stones, sticks of wood, or a satchel. Authorities dealt with her by arresting and jailing her, hospitalising her, committing her to insane asylums, and paying for her rail travel to another town. She boasted that she would quickly escape from hospitals and asylums, and succeeded several times. Her sanity was assessed by doctors, who declared her sane, or as one newspaper stated, "She appears to be perfectly rational on all subjects except that of window smashing". She did not know why she broke windows but did it only "when the craze seized her."

Her window breaking also brought her to the attention of then Wisconsin governor Edward Scofield. She was committed to the Mendota Asylum for the Insane on July 19, 1897, but was released within a few years. She then reportedly married a man named Anderson in North Dakota, with whom she had a child, but claimed that he deserted her after learning that she had been in an asylum.

While it was reported that in 1903, Sweeny was still showing a desire to break windows, by 1904, she was described as having "an uncontrollable desire for roving about the country," so "plays her role of a window-smasher" in order to get free train travel. By 1906, it was reported that "for several years [she] has not engaged in the plate glass business", though she still traveled constantly. In 1907, several newspapers announced Sweeny's death, but in January 1908 one paper reported that she was in Ashland, Wisconsin. In 1912, she was reported to be in Minnesota and Wisconsin, and was threatening to break windows in revenge for her twelve-year-old son having been committed to a home.

In 1925, she was reported to be searching for her son, who, during World War I, had enlisted and been gassed, and was subsequently charged with desertion, jailed and paroled. In 1924, the son reportedly disappeared from his job in Detroit.
