= Black River Falls High School =

Coordinates: 44°17′33.9″N 90°51′50.5″W

Black River Falls High School (BRFHS)
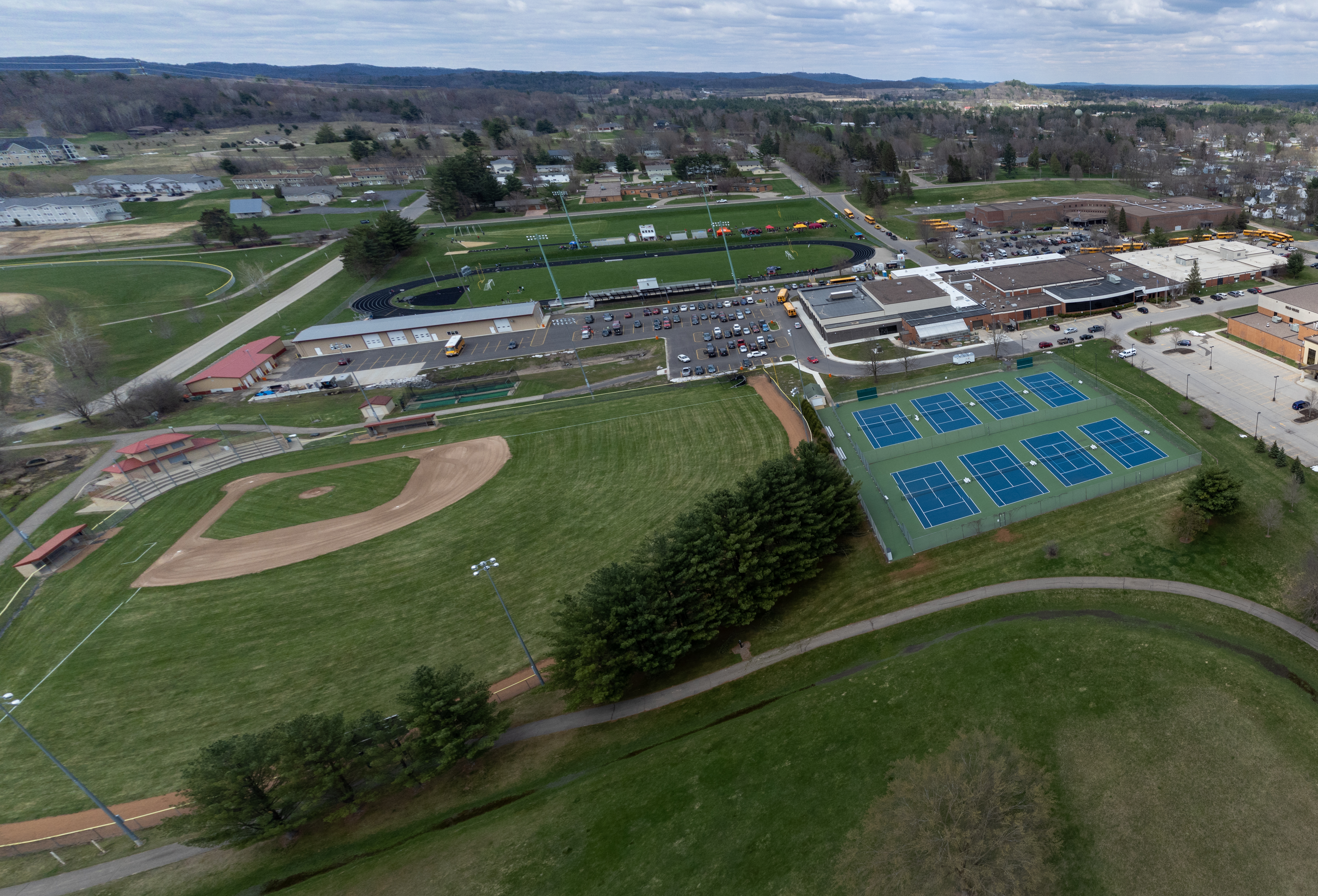

Location
- 1200 Pierce Street; Black River Falls, Jackson County, Wisconsin; United States

Information
- Funding type: Public
- Principal: Kim Penza
- Grades: 9 through 12
- Enrollment: 500 (2024-2025)
- Colors: Black & orange
- Mascot: Tigers
- Website: www.brf.org/o/brfhs

Black River Falls High School is a public school serving grades 9 through 12 in Black River Falls, Wisconsin, United States.

== Administration ==
The principal is Kimberly Penza. Nate Erickson is the assistant principal.

== Academics ==
Black River Falls High School offers courses in English, special education, math, science, social studies, family and consumer education, and more. The Black River Falls technology education department includes CAD, woodworking, metals, and auto mechanics.

== Extra-curricular activities ==
Extra-curricular clubs include Family, Career and Community Leaders of America (FCCLA), National Honor Society, Student Senate, and its student media--The Breeze, Paw Print Online, and Channel 97.

=== Sports ===
Black River Falls is a Division 3 high school in the Coulee Conference. Sports offered include football, basketball, cheerleading, baseball, volleyball, tennis, cross country, track, wrestling, golf, softball, and hockey. In the 2007 spring season, the BRFHS golf team qualified for the state meet, finishing seventh out of eight in the competition.

== Notable alumni ==
- Larry D. Gilbertson, politician and lawyer
- Mark Radcliffe, politician and lawyer
- Anna Becker, Wisconsin lawyer and Judge, Jackson County first female District Attorney and Jackson County first female Circuit Court Judge
- Jack Taylor, holds the National Collegiate Athletic Association all-divisions basketball record for most points in a single game (138)

== Gallery ==
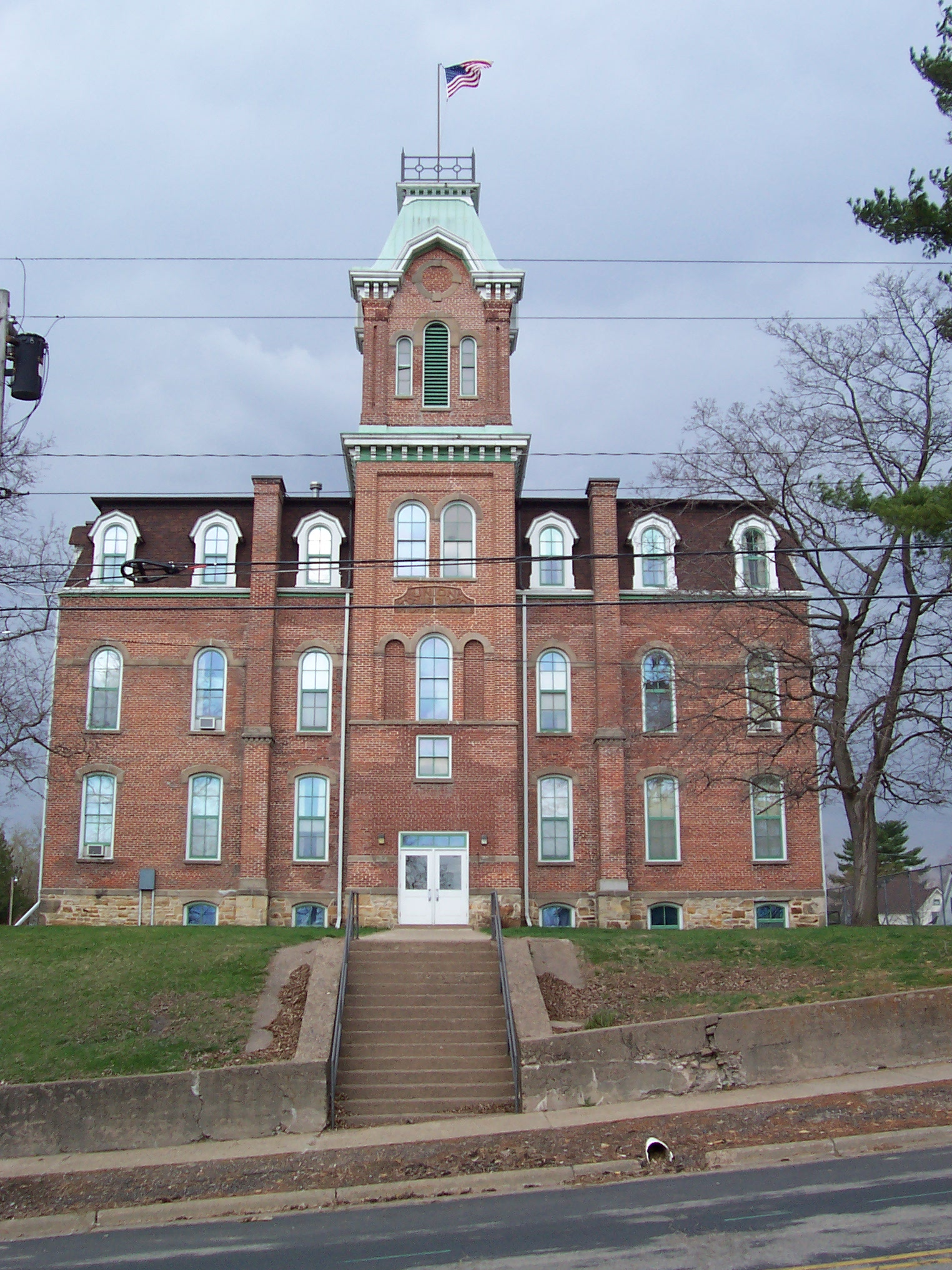
Old Union High School, listed on the National Register of Historic Places

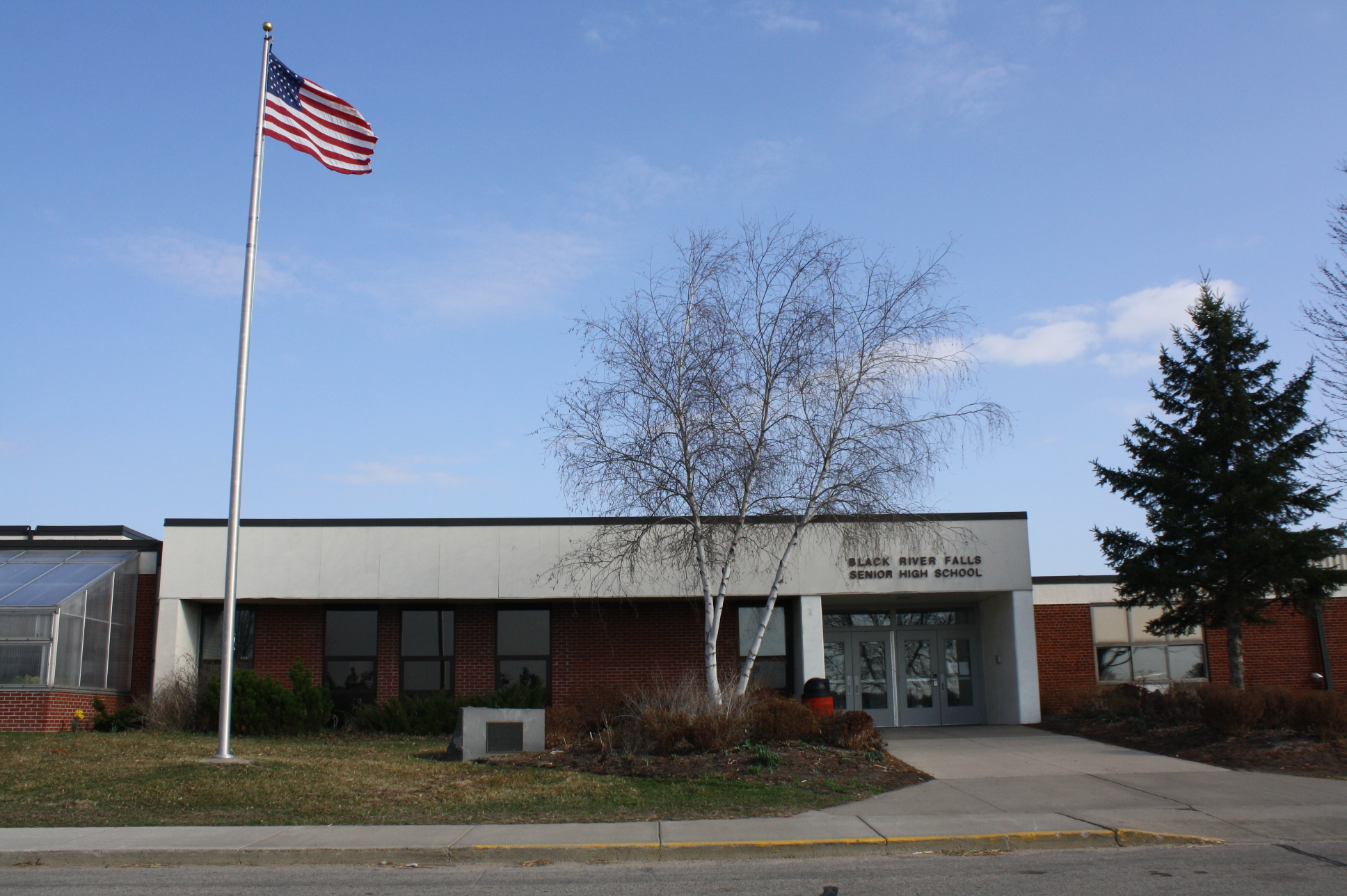
Entrance to the high school
