= Wisconsin Death Trip =

1973 book

- First edition cover art
- Author: Michael Lesy
- Language: English
- Publisher: Pantheon Books
- Publication date: June 1973
- Publication place: United States
- Media type: Print (hardcover)
- Pages: 264
- ISBN: 0-39-448366-9
- OCLC: 989011181
- LC Class: F589.B6 L47

Wisconsin Death Trip is a 1973 historical nonfiction book by Michael Lesy, originally published by Pantheon Books. It charts numerous sordid, tragic, and bizarre incidents that took place in and around Jackson County, Wisconsin between 1885 and 1900, primarily in the town of Black River Falls. The events are outlined through actual written historical documents—primarily articles published in the town newspaper—with additional narration by Lesy, as well as excerpts from works by Hamlin Garland, Sinclair Lewis, and Glenway Wescott, which thematically parallel the incidents depicted. The text is accompanied by contemporaneous photographs and portraits taken in Black River Falls by photographer Charles Van Schaick. Thematically, the book emphasizes the harsh aspects of Midwestern rural life under the pressures of crime, pestilence, mental illness, and urbanization.

Wisconsin Death Trip developed a cult following in the years following its publication. In 1999, British filmmaker James Marsh adapted the book into a critically acclaimed docudrama film of the same name. It was subsequently reprinted in 1991 by Anchor Books, and by the University of New Mexico Press in 2000.

== Overview ==
Wisconsin Death Trip charts myriad grim and bizarre occurrences that took place in and around Jackson County, Wisconsin—in particular, the city of Black River Falls—between 1885 and 1910. In addition to a disintegration of the local economy after the closure of several industrial mines, the populace is plagued by a diphtheria epidemic that kills numerous children, as well as a series of violent crimes, murders, suicides, arsons, religious delusions, mental illness, and superstitions. The vandalism crimes of Mary Sweeny are also showcased throughout.

The book is divided in five sections, with the opening and closing chapters focusing primarily on births, children, and child death; the middle three chapters focus on an array of incidents involving adults. The various occurrences are relayed via actual articles originally published in the local newspaper, the Badger State Banner, by editor Frank Cooper and his son George, as well as written documents from a medical records keeper from Mendota State Hospital, a town historian, and a town gossip. Lesy's own narration is also incorporated, along with selections from writings by Hamlin Garland, Sinclair Lewis, and Glenway Wescott.

Accompanying the text are approximately 200 photographs and portraits by Charles Van Schaick, a German immigrant who served as the Justice of Peace and town photographer for Black River Falls. The book emphasizes the harsh elements of Midwestern rural life during the expansion of the American Frontier and imminent urbanization, and their role in sordid incidents that unfolded in and around the community.

== Development ==
Michael Lesy began developing Wisconsin Death Trip while studying for a master's degree at the University of Wisconsin in the late 1960s, during which he came across a collection of portraits and photographs by Black River Falls photographer Charles Van Schaick—taken between 1890 and 1900—that had been preserved by the Wisconsin Historical Society. The collection had been acquired by the historical society in 1970, after having been left stored in Van Schaick's unused studio for thirty years following his death in 1940. Van Schaik had left behind a total of approximately 30,000 glass plate negatives, approximately 8,000 of which were salvaged by the historical society. "I thought some of the studio portraits were pretty amazing," Lesy recalled. "The whole experience that day seemed like a separate universe."

Inspired by the images, Lesy began researching the history of the town via microforms of contemporaneous newspaper articles from the Black River Falls newspaper, the Badger State Banner, which detailed numerous accounts of economic turmoil, crime, disease, mental illness, and violence. Lesy selected approximately 200 of Van Schaick's photographs for inclusion in the book, which he originally presented as his doctoral thesis at Rutgers University.

== Publication history ==
Pantheon Books first published Wisconsin Death Trip in 1973. It has been reprinted several times in the United States, first by Anchor Books in January 1991, and later by the University of New Mexico Press in January 2000. An eBook version was released by the University of New Mexico Press in August 2016.

== Film adaptation ==
The 1999 film adaptation was directed by James Marsh as a docudrama. It was shot primarily in black-and-white, with contrasting color sequences of modern life in the area. It combined re-enactments of some of the events described in the book with a voice-over narration by Ian Holm. Its visual style was intended to carry the content of the film; as Marsh said: "I wanted to convey in the film the real pathos contained in a four line newspaper report that simultaneously records and dismisses the end of someone's life."

== Legacy ==
In the years following its publication, Wisconsin Death Trip developed a cult following; the book has also been cited as an inspiration for numerous other works of music, literature, and film.

The book inspired a number of musical works, including the opera Black River by Conrad Susa, which was composed in 1975 and revised 1981; the 1999 "dramatic cantata" Songs of Madness and Sorrow by Daron Hagen; and the 1999 album Wisconsin Death Trip by the industrial metal band Static-X. British post-punk band Echo & the Bunnymen used photographs from the book as artwork for their 2001 album Flowers, as well as its singles. A song performed by Jerry Joseph was inspired by the title of the film. Most recently, the book was adapted into a bluegrass/roots-rock opera by Tim Raphael and composer Jeff Berkson, which had its world premiere at Georgetown University's Davis Performing Arts Center on February 1, 2008. The soundtrack for the film adaptation of the book features original music by DJ Shadow and John Cale.

The Australian author Rod Jones cites Wisconsin Death Trip as an inspiration for his novel Billy Sunday, and the American author Robert Goolrick also cites it as an inspiration for his novel A Reliable Wife. Stephen King's book of novellas, Full Dark, No Stars, cites Wisconsin Death Trip as the inspiration for the story 1922. The American author Stewart O'Nan "acknowledges his great debt to Michael Lesy," citing Wisconsin Death Trip as an inspiration for his novel A Prayer for the Dying. (NB: at least one early Picador edition misattributes this to "Michael Levy".)

In commentary on the two-disc DVD release of the Bob Dylan biopic I'm Not There, director Todd Haynes said that much of the imagery for the town of Riddle in the Richard Gere segment of the film was inspired by Lesy's book. Director Walter Murch also used the book as a historical source for the 1985 cult classic Return to Oz.

The creators of the show The Heart, She Holler have discussed being influenced by the book in the creation of their show about rural America.

Author Neil Gaiman cites the book as "hugely influential in the headspace" that led to his 2001 novel American Gods, later adapted into a television series of the same name.
