= Project Nim (film) =

2011 film by James Marsh

- Directed by: James Marsh
- Based on: Nim Chimpsky: The Chimp Who Would Be Human by Elizabeth Hess
- Produced by: Simon Chinn
- Starring: Stephanie LaFarge; Herbert S. Terrace; Laura-Ann Petitto; Bob Ingersoll
- Cinematography: Michael Simmonds
- Edited by: Jinx Godfrey
- Music by: Dickon Hinchliffe
- Production companies: BBC Films; UK Film Council; Passion Pictures; Red Box Films
- Distributed by: Roadside Attractions; HBO Documentary Films (United States); Icon Entertainment International (International)
- Release date: 20 January 2011 (Sundance)
- Running time: 93 minutes
- Countries: United Kingdom; United States
- Language: English
- Box office: $1.5 million

Project Nim is a 2011 documentary film directed by James Marsh. It tells the life story of a chimpanzee named Nim Chimpsky, who was the center of a 1970s research project to determine whether a primate could learn to speak using American Sign Language. Project Nim draws from Elizabeth Hess' book Nim Chimpsky: The Chimp Who Would be Human (2008).

== Summary ==
Late in 1973, two weeks after being born at Dr. William Lemmon's Institute for Primate Studies in Oklahoma, Nim Chimpsky, a chimpanzee, was separated from his mother and taken to New York to participate in an extended study of animal language acquisition conducted by Dr. Herbert S. Terrace of Columbia University. Nim was placed in the home of Stephanie LaFarge, a former student of Terrace, who was instructed to raise him as if he were a human child to see if he would acquire human-like language.

Neither LaFarge nor her husband or children were fluent in the American Sign Language. Terrace and his research assistant, Laura-Ann Petitto, had concerns that the experiment should be more controlled, so Nim was eventually moved to a property owned by Columbia University, where he was raised and taught by a group of students, who would bring him to a classroom at Columbia to be tested. He learned the signs for many more words and attracted some media attention, but he also injured a number of the researchers, which became increasingly troubling as he continued to become larger and stronger.

After ending the experiment, Dr. Terrace returned Nim to the Institute for Primate Studies, where Nim saw another chimpanzee for the first time since he was an infant. An analysis of his data led Dr Terrace to conclude that Nim's use of sign language seemed to be mimicry to receive a reward rather than indicating an understanding of grammar and a more human-like use of language.

Faced with financial difficulties, Dr. Lemmon sold many of his chimpanzees, including Nim, to the Laboratory for Experimental Medicine and Surgery in Primates (LEMSIP), a pharmaceutical animal testing laboratory managed by New York University (NYU). Bob Ingersoll, an Institute for Primate Studies employee who had befriended Nim, objected to the move and worked to free Nim, and a newspaper article led to a lawyer becoming involved. Fearing negative publicity, NYU released Nim, and he was bought by Cleveland Amory and moved to Black Beauty Ranch in Texas.

Although Nim was no longer being experimented on, he was the only primate at Black Beauty Ranch. Occasionally, he would escape from his cage, and on one of these occasions, he killed a dog. LaFarge visited him, and after entering his cage, Nim dragged her about by her ankle.

A year after moving to the ranch, a female chimpanzee was brought to live with Nim. Ten years later, Ingersoll, who had not been allowed to visit Nim, heard the female chimp was in failing health and contacted the new manager at Black Beauty Ranch to ask if he could visit. Ingersoll reestablished a relationship with Nim and arranged with James Mahoney for a male and female chimp to be sent to the ranch from LEMSIP, which was shutting down. Five years later, on March 10, 2000, Nim died at the age of 26 of a heart attack.

== Release ==
The film debuted at the Sundance Film Festival on January 20, 2011, and it began a limited theatrical release in the United States on July 8.

=== Home media ===
Lionsgate Home Entertainment released the film on DVD in the United States on February 7, 2012.

== Reception and awards ==
Project Nim was released to critical acclaim. On review aggregator website Rotten Tomatoes, it has an approval rating of 97% based on 147 reviews, with an average score of 8.1/10; the sites "critics consensus" reads: "Equal parts hilarious, poignant, and heartbreaking, Project Nim not only tells a compelling story masterfully, but also raises the flag on the darker side of human nature". On Metacritic, the film has a weighted average score of 83 out of a 100 based on 33 critics, indicating "universal acclaim".

David Rooney of The Hollywood Reporter wrote: "This haunting life story is an exquisite example of non-fiction filmmaking as full-bodied, emotionally complex drama." Marjorie Baumgarten of The Austin Chronicle was less positive, writing: "There is no question Nim was exploited for human gain, yet there are important aspects which Marsh leaves unexplored."

The film won 15 awards and was nominated for 27, including Best Documentary at the 65th British Academy Film Awards.

== Terrace's response ==
Herbert S. Terrace, who conducted the language study on Nim, wrote an op-ed in response to what he considered the film's negative portrayal of his Nim project. Terrace said the filmmakers inaccurately equated his study's negative results with "failure" and erred in ignoring its "groundbreaking scientific insights."

In 2019, Terrace published the book Why Chimpanzees Can’t Learn Language and Only Humans Can. In it, he describes the documentary Project Nim as "mainly an ad hominem attack" on himself. Terrace also criticised the documentary for its "complete failure to present the scientific background of the work" done or the "theoretical significance" of that work.
