= Larry D. Gilbertson =

American lawyer and politician

Larry D. Gilbertson (November 20, 1917 – July 11, 1986) was an American lawyer and politician.

Born in Black River Falls, Wisconsin, Gilbertson graduated from Black River Falls High School and married Ruth Fink in 1941. He received his bachelor's degree from the University of Minnesota and his law degree from University of Wisconsin Law School in 1942. He served in the United States Army during World War II. He practiced law in Black River Falls and served as village and district attorney. From 1951 to 1953, Gilbertson served in the Wisconsin State Assembly and was a Republican. He worked as general counsel for the Wisconsin Chamber of Commerce and United States Small Business Administration. Gilbertson was also involved with the insurance business in Washington, D.C., and New York City. Gilbertson died in Arlington, Virginia.
