= WWIS (AM) =

- Black River Falls, Wisconsin; United States
- Frequency: 1260 kHz
- Branding: WWIS AM 1260 FM 105.3 The Hill

Programming
- Format: Adult contemporary; full service
- Affiliations: Compass Media Networks; Premiere Networks

Ownership
- Owner: G&G Media Services LLC
- Sister stations: WWIS-FM

History
- First air date: August 23, 1958
- Call sign meaning: Wisconsin

Technical information
- Licensing authority: FCC
- Facility ID: 74188
- Class: D
- Power: 580 watts day
- Transmitter coordinates: 44°19′11.00″N 90°53′31.00″W
- Translator: 105.3 W287CT (Black River Falls)

Links
- Public license information: Public file; LMS
- Webcast: Listen Live
- Website: wwisradio.com

WWIS (1260 kHz) is an AM radio station broadcasting a full-service adult contemporary music format. Licensed to Black River Falls, Wisconsin, United States. The station is currently owned by G&G Media Services LLC and features programming from Compass Media Networks and Premiere Networks.
