= Laura-Ann Petitto =

American psychologist and neuroscientist (born c. 1954)

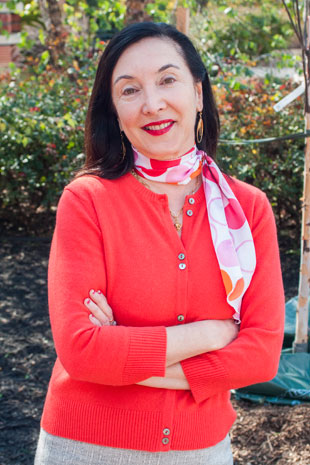
- Born: New York City, New York, United States
- Education: Ramapo College, New York University, Harvard University
- Awards: Guggenheim Fellowship (1998)
- Scientific career
- Workplaces: Harvard University, McGill University, Dartmouth College, University of Toronto, Gallaudet University

Laura-Ann Petitto (born c. 1954) is a cognitive neuroscientist and a developmental cognitive neuroscientist known for her research and scientific discoveries involving the language capacity of chimpanzees, the biological bases of language in humans, especially early language acquisition (be it language on the hands in signed languages or on the tongue in spoken languages), early reading, and bilingualism, bilingual reading, and the bilingual brain. Significant scientific discoveries include the existence of linguistic babbling on the hands of deaf babies (“manual babbling”) and the equivalent neural processing of signed and spoken languages in the human brain. She is recognized for her contributions to the creation of the new scientific discipline, called educational neuroscience. Petitto chaired a new undergraduate department at Dartmouth College, called "Educational Neuroscience and Human Development" (2002–2007), and was a Co-Principal Investigator in the National Science Foundation and Dartmouth's Science of Learning Center, called the "Center for Cognitive and Educational Neuroscience" (2004–2007). At Gallaudet University (2011–present), Petitto led a team in the creation of the first PhD in Educational Neuroscience program in the United States. Petitto is the Co-Principal Investigator as well as Science Director of the National Science Foundation and Gallaudet University’s Science of Learning Center, called the "Visual Language and Visual Learning Center (VL2)". Petitto is also founder and Scientific Director of the Brain and Language Laboratory for Neuroimaging (“BL2”) at Gallaudet University.

== Biography ==
=== Education ===
Petitto received her Bachelor of Science degree in 1975 from Ramapo College of New Jersey while taking undergraduate classes and conducting cross-species language research with the chimpanzee "Nim Chimpsky" at Columbia University (New York City, New York). Petitto then conducted psycholinguistic research on American Sign Language (ASL) in the laboratory of Ursula Bellugi at The Salk Institute for Biological Studies (La Jolla, California), along with Linguist, Edward Klima, of the University of California, San Diego (UCSD), where Petitto began graduate study in the Department of Linguistics (1976–1977). Petitto continued graduate study at New York University (Master's degree, 1978, specializing in Rehabilitative Counseling Psychology and Deafness, 1977–1978). Petitto then researched the phonological structure of ASL in "The Linguistics Research Laboratory" of William Stokoe at Gallaudet University in Washington, D.C. (1978–1979). In 1979, Petitto began graduate study at Harvard University, Department of Human Development and Psychology, in its "Language & Cognition" track. While Roger Brown (primary Graduate Advisor) and Courtney Cazden (co-Advisor) were Petitto's mentors in "Cognition," Noam Chomsky at MIT was Petitto's mentor in "Language." Petitto first met the renowned Linguist when working with Nim Chimpsky on Project Nim in the mid 1970s and this intellectual mentorship endured throughout her Harvard graduate studies and for decades to follow. Petitto was graduated from Harvard with a master's degree in 1981, and a Doctorate/Ed.D. in March, 1984. Leaving Harvard in fall 1983 to take up her first faculty appointment in McGill University's Department of Psychology (Montreal, Quebec, Canada), Petitto also won a John D. and Catherine T. MacArthur Foundation Postdoctoral Fellowship (awarded to 10 young scientists in the USA). Commuting between McGill and Salk in her first few faculty years, Petitto studied with Ursula Bellugi and Francis Crick (Salk), and Elizabeth Bates (UCSD), intellectual mentorships that would span decades thereafter. Petitto's McGill psychology department role expanded when she also became a research scientist at the Montreal Neurological Institute and Hospital, and a collaborating scientist on The McDonnell-Pew Centre Grant in Cognitive Neuroscience with Brenda Milner, Michael Petrides (PIs), as well as with Robert Zatorre (1990–2001).

== Scientific contributions ==
Petitto's research and discoveries span several scientific disciplines. Her early work with Nim Chimpsky and her later work with humans, encompasses anthropology, comparative ethology, evolutionary biology, cognitive neuroscience, cognitive science, theoretical linguistics, philosophy, psychology, psycholinguistics, language acquisition, child development, evolutionary psychology, American Sign Language, deaf studies, and bilingualism. Her overall discoveries involve:

- (1) cross-species (apes and humans) language and cognitive capacities,
- (2) the nature of early human language acquisition, structure, and representation in the human brain; especially infants’ (ages 6–12 months) peaked neural sensitivity (involving the brain's STG and associated neural networks) to maximally-contrasting, rhythmic temporal patterning that in turn permits them to discover human language phonological structure in early life, and which is key to phonetic segmentation in word learning, discerning linguistic/syntactic patterning, and phonetic decoding in early reading,
- (3) the structure, grammar, and representation of natural signed languages of Deaf people, and
- (4) the nature of bilingual infants, children, and adults' dual language and reading development, processing, and bilingual brain organization.

Advancement of New Discipline: Petitto had an early role in the creation of a new scientific discipline with her colleague and husband Kevin Niall Dunbar, which they termed Educational Neuroscience. Educational Neuroscience is a sister discipline of Cognitive Neuroscience, in which basic neuroscience and behavioral science discoveries about the developing brain and the growing child are joined with their translational implications, towards the ultimate goal of solving core problems in society and the education of young children.

Advancement of Technology: Petitto's science shows a history of pushing technology in new directions so as to answer previously insoluble questions in science, involving, for example, novel use of Positron Emission Technology (PET) with anatomical Magnetic Resonance Imaging (MRI) so as to identify the brain tissue and systems underlying human signed languages as compared with the tissue/systems underlying spoken languages; OPTOTRAK (high-speed kinetics and dynamic motion capture system) to build a device analogous to a speech spectrogram but for signed languages so as to study the fundamental frequency (fo or FF) of deaf and hearing infants’ linguistic manual babbling; and functional Magnetic Resonance Imaging (fMRI) neuroimaging to conduct original studies comparing bilingual and monolingual adult brains. To surmount the discipline's widely known challenges of studying developing newborn brains over time with fMRI, Petitto used functional Near Infrared Spectroscopy (fNIRS) neuroimaging to conduct among the first studies of human infant brains as they develop over time while acquiring one versus two languages (monolingual and bilingual infant brains compared). Petitto uses Eye-Tracking; and, with a team of collaborating scientists, Petitto led a research team to advance and integrate novel technology involving a Robot, an Avatar, Thermal Infrared Imaging plus fNIRS, with Eye-Tracking, and Kinect to build an artificial agent + human infant language learning tool (called RAVE) capable of socially-contingent and socially interactive communications with an infant when it is most engaged and "ready to learn."

Taken together, Petitto's research discoveries and scientific writings have offered testable hypotheses and theory regarding the neural basis for the brain's specialization for human language, the types of language features a child must minimally be exposed to (and when) in early life (sensitive or critical periods), what happens if early critical periods are missed, and how best to facilitate optimal language learning in all children acquiring all human languages be they signed or spoken.

=== Early research ===
Beginning in 1973 in the Department of Psychology at Columbia University, Petitto attempted to teach signed language to a baby chimpanzee ("Project Nim Chimpsky," named after Noam Chomsky, with Professors Herbert Terrace and Thomas Bever). Petitto had a leading role on Project Nim Chimpsky as the "Primary Sign Language Teacher", "Project Coordinator", and primary "Surrogate Mother". Despite the dangers of living with a chimpanzee, Petitto lived with and cared for Nim as a child in an attempt to create a natural language, cognitive, and highly caring and rich social environment, mirroring that of a human child. Most of the chimp's scientific training and accomplishments were achieved during Petitto's 4-year tenure on the Project as Nim's teacher and caretaker. She and her colleagues have authored several of the world's seminal scientific papers on the question of language in chimpanzees, including now classic articles on the similarities and differences between the ape and human mind.

After her undergraduate work with Nim Chimpsky, Petitto went on to make discoveries about the linguistic structure, acquisition, and representation in the brain of the world's natural signed languages, especially American Sign Language (ASL). Using signed languages as a new "microscope" to discover the central/universal properties of human language in the brain (those that are distinct from the modality of language transmission and reception), Petitto focused on the following lines of research:

- (1) Universal Linguistic Structures (cross-linguistic studies of signed and spoken languages, and cross-linguistic studies of different signed languages, especially ASL and Langue des Signes Québécoise, LSQ),
- (2) Linguistic timing milestones in development (the highly similar maturational timing in the achievement of language milestones across young children acquiring spoken and signed languages),
- (3) Universal linguistic structures in development (the highly similar acquisition of specific parts of natural language structure, with similar timing and use, across signed and spoken languages). For example, similar pronouns, pronominal reference, and pronoun-reversals, across young children acquiring spoken and signed languages, despite the radically different linguistic form of pronouns in signed languages. The discovery of rhythmically alternating, phonetic-syllabic "manual babbling" on the hands in babies acquiring signed languages (be they Deaf or hearing), identical in linguistic structure, timing, and use to vocal Babbling in hearing babies acquiring spoken languages. For decades, Babbling was viewed as inextricably tied to sound and speech. However, the discovery of hand Babbling demonstrated that rather than sound being key, Babbling reflects the infant's biologically given sensitivity to highly specific patterns that are part of language structure. The discovery forced a reconceptualization of the nature of human Language by decoupling Speech and Language. The discovery of manual Babbling was featured on both the cover of Science and the front page of the New York Times on the same day,
- (4) Distinct knowledge representation in development, e.g., domain-specific versus domain-general knowledge in child development: the difference between language versus communicative gesture in all children's development,
- (5) Brain Tissue Dedication for Aspects of Human Language Structure and Processing (convergences of specific linguistic functions on specific brain tissue and neural systems across signed and spoken languages). For example, previously regarding spoken language, phonological processing was found to occur in the left hemisphere's (LH) Superior Temporal Gyrus (brain tissue regarded as unimodal sound processing tissue for 125 years), and the Left Inferior Frontal Cortex was regarded as the brain's site for the search and retrieval of information about word meanings (due to its proximity to LH speech production mechanisms). However, Petitto, Robert Zatorre, and team found that the same brain tissue and neural systems recruitment are used when processing the same parts of language regardless of whether the language was on the hands in signed languages or the tongue in spoken languages. Petitto is associated with advancing the hypothesis that this brain site and systems are not neurally set to sound but to specific patterns that are universal to human language structure, which corroborated her earlier infant manual babbling discoveries and moved beyond "where" language processing occurs in the human brain to explain "why": the nature of its underlying neural basis.

Petitto's research has contributed to the body of knowledge establishing that the signed languages of deaf people around the world are real languages with the full expressive capacity as spoken languages. Petitto and colleagues were also the first to study experimentally the validity of a widely used educational practice with Deaf children in the 1970s, whereupon teachers (typically hearing) used parts of ASL signs and linguistic structure simultaneously while speaking English in the classroom, called "Simultaneous Communication" (or "Simcom"). The Petitto team's experimental study of Simcom with Deaf children demonstrated empirically that it was highly impoverished at representing either ASL or English, and, in turn, it was a non-optimal teaching method. Instead their work supported the use of a natural signed language with Deaf children from early life such as ASL, which would best provide a solid linguistic foundation upon which to learn other languages (such as English). They advanced the idea that Deaf Education would be best to move to a full Bilingual and Bicultural educational model, and that this course was most commensurate with the biological requirements in human brain development to achieve the most healthy language learning. This research had lasting implications for subsequent Deaf Education policy and practice.

=== Current research ===
Petitto's more recent studies involve the use of a combination of four disciplines:

- Genetic analyses (polymorphisms in candidate genes),
- Behavioral measures of higher cognitive processes from psycholinguistics and developmental science, combined with
- Neuroimaging from cognitive neuroscience and developmental cognitive neuroscience. Petitto and team predominately use brain imaging technology called functional Near Infrared Spectroscopy (fNIRS) in addition to an optical neuroimaging system called NIRx, combined with eye-tracking, and thermal infrared imaging technology as pioneered by colleague Arcangelo Merla,
- Artificial Intelligence and intelligent machines in human socially contingent conversations: The Robot-Avatar-Thermal Infrared Imaging Enhanced learning tool, called "RAVE" to teach signed language to young deaf babies with "minimal language exposure" (MLE) in early life.

Since 2000, Petitto's cognitive neuroscience/educational neuroscience research program has continued. Petitto and her laboratory team are known for discovering that young bilingual children are not harmed, delayed, or confused by early dual language exposure. These children not only achieve their language milestones (in each language) on the same timetable as monolinguals, they demonstrate the same semantic and conceptual development as monolinguals, with societal implications that early-life (rather than later) bilingual and multilingual language exposure is optimal for language and reading success. Petitto and her team have also identified the mechanisms that make possible the human infant's early capacity to phonetically discriminate (segment and categorize) the constantly varying linguistic stream around them, and they have articulated the developmental conditions required for this capacity to grow most vibrantly in all children. Petitto and team have identified fundamental processes that underlie human reading and spelling in all language users and found evidence for select reading advantages in young bilingual children as compared to matched monolingual peers, termed the "bilingual reading advantage". They have further discovered surprising ways in which bilingual schooling can ameliorate the deleterious effects of low SES. They are also among the first group of researchers to compare directly adult bilingual and monolingual brains and what happens when the adult brain learns two artificial languages as a second language. She has conducted studies of how extensive training (expertise) in one domain of knowledge impacts or "transfers" to other domains of knowledge (and the extent of this transfer). Since 2014, Petitto (PI) and her team conduct behavioral, brain, and Artificial Intelligence (Robot, Avatar, Thermal Infrared Imaging) studies specifically to advance understanding of the human learning capacity across the lifespan, and especially the optimal conditions for language learning in young deaf and hearing children acquiring signed and spoken languages.

== Research awards ==
Petitto is the recipient of over twenty international prizes and awards including,

- The Sin Wai-Kin Distinguished Visiting Professorship in the Humanities, University of Hong Kong (to facilitate the creation of an Educational Neuroscience Laboratory and studies), 2014–2016.
- The 14th Dalai Lama: Invited presentation before, and dialogue with the 14th Dalai Lama about the neuroscience of how experience can impact brain structures and functions, October 2010.
- Fellow of the American Association for the Advancement of Science (AAAS). Elected October 2008. Presented at the Fellow Forum, Chicago, 14 February 2009.
- Fellow of the Association for Psychological Science (APS), December 2008.
- The Justine and Yves Sergent International Prize in Cognitive Neuroscience, Université de Montréal Honorary Diploma, Faculty of Medicine, Quebec, Canada, 2004.
- Pope John Paul II: Invited presentation and expert panel member representing the newly created discipline "Educational Neuroscience" (Mind, Brain and Education) at the 400th Anniversary Celebration of Galileo Galilei's Birthday at the Pontifical Scientific Academy with an audience before Pope John Paul II, Vatican City, Italy, November 2003.
- Guggenheim Award (for her "unusually distinguished achievements in the past and exceptional promise for future accomplishment" in the discipline of Neuroscience), conferred Spring, 1998.
- Visiting Resident Scholar, Departments of Nuclear Medicine & Cognitive Science, at the Università & Ospedale Istituto San Raffaele, in Milan, Italy, 1998–1999.
- Fellow at the Center for Advanced Study in the Behavioral Sciences, Stanford University, Stanford, California, 1991–1992.
- Visiting Resident Scholar, Department of Experimental Psychology, University of Cambridge, and the Medical Research Council (Speech and Language Group), in Cambridge, England, in conjunction with the Medical Research Council (Cognitive Development Unit), in London, England, 1987–1988.
- American Psychological Association Boyd R. McCandless "Young Scientist Award" (for "outstanding early career contributions to, and achievements in Developmental Psychology"), conferred at the APA Convention, Atlanta, GA, 1988.
- American Psychological Association "Young Psychologist Award", conferred at the 24th International Congress of Psychology, Sydney, Australia, 1988.
