= Wisconsin Death Trip (film) =

1999 film by James Marsh

- Original promotional artwork
- Directed by: James Marsh
- Screenplay by: James Marsh
- Based on: Wisconsin Death Trip by Michael Lesy
- Produced by: James Marsh; Maureen A. Ryan
- Narrated by: Ian Holm
- Cinematography: Eigil Bryld
- Edited by: Jinx Godfrey
- Music by: John Cale
- Production companies: Cinemax; BBC Arena
- Release dates: September 5, 1999 (Telluride Film Festival); December 1, 1999 (New York City); July 4, 2000 (Cinemax)
- Running time: 76 minutes
- Countries: United States; United Kingdom
- Language: English

Wisconsin Death Trip is a 1999 docudrama film written for the screen and directed by James Marsh, based on the 1973 historical nonfiction book of the same name by Michael Lesy. The film dramatizes a series of macabre incidents that took place in and around Black River Falls, Wisconsin in the late-19th century. It utilizes silent black-and-white reenactment footage contrasted with contemporary color footage of the region, along with voice-over narration by Sir Ian Holm, orating contemporaneous newspaper articles written about the occurrences. Music featured in the film includes DJ Shadow and John Cale.

Marsh began developing a documentary film adaptation of Lesey's book after moving to the United States in 1995. The film was produced over approximately four years, with Marsh intermittently shooting the reenactment footage on location in Wisconsin over a one-and-a-half-year period. The film opened at the Telluride Film Festival in September 1999 before being released theatrically at New York City's Film Forum in December 1999. It premiered on Cinemax on July 4, 2000. In the United Kingdom, the film was shown on the BBC as part of the documentary series Arena, who had originally helped finance the project.

Wisconsin Death Trip was largely met with critical praise, particularly for its cinematography; however, some film critics criticized its structure and inclusion of modern-day footage. The film received several accolades, including two BAFTA Television Award nominations; cinematographer Eigil Bryld won the award in the category of Best Photography.

== Plot ==
Between 1890 and 1900 in northern Wisconsin, a series of bizarre events begin to occur amongst the local population (largely German, Swedish, and Norwegian immigrants) after the closure of several mines in the area; these events happened in conjunction with a collapse of the local economy and liquidation of banks. Several infants are abandoned by their parents, while a diphtheria epidemic claims the lives of numerous children. A local schoolteacher, Mary Sweeny, is institutionalized after going on a rampage breaking the windows of numerous homes and buildings while under the influence of cocaine. Meanwhile, a young deaf and mute boy shoots his little sister to death with a pistol. The wife of a German immigrant is mysteriously found frozen to death six miles outside of Black River Falls, after mourning the death of her own child.

In Brandon, two young boys ambush a farmer and murder him with a shotgun before taking over his home. The elder brother, John, flees after the crime is discovered, and a manhunt ensues. Once captured, John is sentenced to life imprisonment. Meanwhile, a Norwegian teenage girl commits suicide by drowning herself in a lake near Kenosha; her suicide note reveals she was physically abused and over-worked by her parents. Several other young jilted lovers commit suicide by hanging and other methods. Anna, a young Polish girl, is discovered to be a serial arsonist responsible for burning multiple properties down.

Numerous young adults in the region face a number of turmoils, and commit violent acts of varying degrees: A father bludgeons his infant son to death before attempting to murder his wife, and later, a young man shoots a woman to death when she refuses his marriage proposal, before turning the gun on himself. Religious delusion also plagues the local communities: John Isaacson holds the members of a Christian meeting at knifepoint, believing himself to be vanquishing Satan. Shortly after, a German immigrant intentionally starves his livestock to death, and blames it on witches he believes are preying upon him. Mrs. Dutton, of La Crosse, believes herself to be Jesus reincarnated, and a Mrs. Lawson, believing herself to be haunted by Satan, drowns her three children in a lake in St. Croix.

In Brockway, a woman claiming to be a world-renowned French opera singer named Pauline L'Allemand arrives from Chicago to claim a land she has allegedly inherited. With her son, Edgar, she builds a home and stages a series of live performances that are compromised by her false teeth. Her disheveled state leads locals to believe she may be an imposter. Pauline's mental state deteriorates, and she begins hearing voices and claiming to be in communion with spirits. After Edgar steals cement to repair their dilapidating house, the two are put on trial, during which Pauline engages in incoherent rants and espouses anti-Catholic conspiracy theories, leading her to be declared legally insane and institutionalized at Mendota Hospital.

While numerous business ventures collapse in tandem with the economy, adulterous affairs amongst the region's middle-aged residents lead to further violence and murder. A tramp murders several servant girls while attempting to commit robbery before killing himself. Meanwhile, Mary Sweeny is released from the psychiatric hospital, and continues to travel aimlessly throughout the region, committing further destruction of windows, including at an Eau Claire train station. Pauline L'Allemande eventually escapes from Mendota and disappears. She resurfaces later in Chicago, and claims to have been tormented in Mendota by a ventriloquist performing acts in the room next to hers.

A number of contemporary events from the mid-to-late-20th century are juxtaposed against those of the 1890s, including the crimes of Wisconsin natives Ed Gein and Jeffrey Dahmer.

== Cast ==
- Jo Vukelich as Mary Sweeny
- Marilyn White as Pauline L'Allemand
- Jeffrey Golden as The Newspaper Editor
- Marcus Monroe as Young Anderson
- John Schneider as Asylum Clerk
- John Baltes as Undertaker
- Raeleen McMillion as Crying Woman
- Krista Grambow as Mourning Woman
- Clay Anton as Man of Eloping Couple
- Bobbie Jo Westphal as Woman of Eloping Couple
- Scott Hulbert as Pouch
- Debra Sommi as Servant Girl
- Zeke Dasho as Edgar L'Allemand

== Style ==
Wisconsin Death Trip features a mixture of actual historical photographs of individuals and scenes from the events depicted, along with black-and-white reenactments featuring actors. The reenactment footage contains no dialogue. Director James Marsh stated that he felt the book was "unfilmable", and chose to utilize its photographs juxtaposed with reenactments of the stories presented:

What I did get from the book was the rhythm: the emerging incremental idea. But in terms of the stories themselves, the starting point was definitely photographic. Start with an image, a single image, and then move – a lot of long tracking shots, to keep a sense of the still image moving. But I knew I couldn't film it... The stories are based on a respect for these individual tragedies and disasters. If the film lacks one thing, it's a governing idea on that level – but it would have been a travesty.

The film's visual style was intended to carry the content of the film; as Marsh said: "I wanted to convey in the film the real pathos contained in a four line newspaper report that simultaneously records and dismisses the end of someone's life."

In his book Adaptation and the Avant-Garde: Alternative Perspectives on Adaptation Theory and Practice (2011), scholar William Verrone cites Wisconsin Death Trip as an example of an avant-garde film. Verrone describes the film as a "hodgepodge of collage and assemblage, a fertile mix of appropriated text and image that results in a somber study of real-life hardship and depredation". Writer Ramsey Campbell classifies Wisconsin Death Trip as a horror film.

== Production ==
=== Development ===
Documentary filmmaker James Marsh began developing a docudrama film adaptation of Michael Lesy's 1973 nonfiction book of the same name after moving to the United States in 1995. Prior to this, Marsh had produced works for the BBC series Arena. The BBC provided seed money to help finance Wisconsin Death Trip, and Marsh also acquired funding from a Norwegian American immigrant fund in the United States.

Marsh met with New York-based film producer Maureen Ryan, who agreed to produce the feature despite it having "no obvious commercial prospects and a tiny budget provided by the BBC". According to Marsh, the film took approximately four years to develop between its initial production and filming.

=== Filming ===
By Marsh's account, Wisconsin Death Trip was a protracted process: "I did it in episodes. I'd shoot in one season. And then reflect on what I'd done and go shoot some more the next season. Then run out of money. Then go back again." To shoot the reenactment footage featured in the film, Marsh hired Danish cinematographer Eigil Bryld, with whom his wife had attended school in Denmark. Approximately nine and a half weeks of shooting occurred over a year-and-a-half period throughout Wisconsin, in the cities of Green Bay, Milwaukee, Cassville, and Appleton. A total of 65 local actors were employed to perform in the reenactment footage.

Marsh took advantage of numerous preserved historical homes and other sites in Wisconsin to shoot the film, as they contained "historically correct, sometimes priceless antiques" that matched the necessary period setting. He stated that the crew was granted permission to shoot at "almost every historical site that we requested," and that they offered a nominal donation in exchange for the historical site managers' allowing them to film there. Two different scenes were filmed at the site of a preserved steam locomotive in Eagle, Wisconsin.

== Release ==
Wisconsin Death Trip was rejected for distribution by several European companies, who deemed it "morbid, distasteful and obsessed with the wrong aspects of human life", and the filmmakers' submission of it to the PBS series American Experience was met with no response. The film screened at the Telluride Film Festival on September 5, 1999, where it was noted by a Los Angeles Times critic that it "left people shaken". It subsequently was screened at the Venice International Film Festival the same year. The film was released in New York City at the Film Forum on December 1, 1999. In the United Kingdom, the film was presented on the BBC documentary series Arena in 2000. The film was released on the U.S. pay television channel Cinemax on July 4, 2000.

=== Critical response ===
Jonathan Romney of The Guardian praised the film as "always lyrical, sometimes blackly farcical, and sometimes terrifying, as it reveals the romanticized American frontier's true desperation". Dennis Harvey of Variety similarly praised it as a "mordantly humorous, original work [that] makes a striking first impression", though he conceded that its structure becomes "repetitious after a while". Edward Guthmann of the San Francisco Chronicle provided an opposing point of view regarding the film's structure, noting that it moves "both symbolically and literally through the four seasons, [as] Ian Holm's narration grows more alarmed, more troubled". Guthmann also lauded the film's soundtrack as "hypnotizing", noting the use of classical music by Johannes Brahms, Johann Sebastian Bach, Claude Debussy and Sergei Rachmaninoff, as well as the contributions from contemporary artists Mark O'Connor, John Cale and Arvo Part.

Stephen Holden of The New York Times summarized the film as "a creepily enthralling document that illustrates the susceptibility to breakdown of what we think of as sanity and civilization," but was critical of the colorized contemporary sequences, feeling they were tonally inconsistent with the rest of the film. Walter Addiego of the San Francisco Examiner made a similar criticism, noting that the film "strays when it offers color footage of the town today, with the too-easy implication that some things never change". The Chicago Tribune's Michael Wilmington echoed a similar sentiment, describing the contemporary footage as "slightly sarcastic" in contrast to the "black and white evocations of a distant past that nag like recurring, dread-filled dreams".

Though critical of Ian Holm's narration, which he characterized as consisting of some "cheap ironic shots" at modern American culture, New York Post critic Jonathan Foreman praised the film's use of historical photographs, adding that the reenactment footage has "none of the cheesiness of reality-TV programs like Unsolved Mysteries and America's Most Wanted. Indeed, they're shot in such a way as to make acts of violence truly shocking". The A.V. Club's Nathan Rabin wrote that the film plays like "both a cheap holiday in historical misery and an unclassifiable, uncategorizable exercise in morbid beauty, [and] vividly captures the homespun horror of small-town 19th-century madness", but ultimately felt that the film was exploitative in nature.

On the review aggregator website Rotten Tomatoes, 75% of 24 critics' reviews are positive, with an average rating of 6.80/10. Metacritic, which uses a weighted average, assigned the film a score of 40 out of 100, based on 6 critics, indicating "mixed or average" reviews.

=== Accolades ===
Award/association	Year	Category	Recipient	Result	Ref.
British Academy Television Awards	2001	Best Photography (Factual)	Eigil Bryld	Won	
British Academy Television Awards	2001	Huw Weldon Award	Wisconsin Death Trip	Nominated	
News & Documentary Emmy Awards	2001	Best Lighting Direction	Eigil Bryld	Nominated	
Columbus International Film & Video Festival	2009	Bronze Plaque Award	Wisconsin Death Trip	Won	
Royal Television Society Programme Awards	2001	Best Documentary	Wisconsin Death Trip	Won	
San Sebastián International Film Festival	1999	FIPRESCI Prize	Wisconsin Death Trip	Won	
Stockholm International Film Festival	1999	Bronze Horse	Wisconsin Death Trip	Nominated	

=== Home media ===
Home Video Entertainment released Wisconsin Death Trip on DVD in the United States on February 26, 2004. The disc includes a behind-the-scenes documentary, an audio commentary with Marsh, and several deleted scenes. Also in 2004, Tartan Video released a region-free DVD in the United Kingdom which also contains the commentary and deleted scenes, though the behind-the-scenes documentary is not present.

== Sources ==
- Campbell, Ramsey (2001). The Mammoth Book of Best New Horror. Vol. 12. New York City: Carroll & Graf. ISBN 978-0-786-70919-9.
- Quinney, Charlotte Louise (2005). Wisconsin Death Trip: An Excursion into the Midwestern Gothic (Thesis). Michigan State University. Archived from the original on December 18, 2022.
- Ryan, Maureen A. (2017) [2010]. Producer to Producer: A Step-by-step Guide to Low-budget Independent Film Producing (Second ed.). Studio City, California: Michael Wiese Productions. ISBN 978-1-615-93266-5.
- Verrone, William (2011). Adaptation and the Avant-Garde: Alternative Perspectives on Adaptation Theory and Practice. London: Bloomsbury. ISBN 978-1-628-92851-8.
- Winterbottom, Michael (2021). Dark Matter: Independent Filmmaking in the 21st Century. London: BFI. ISBN 978-1-839-02340-8.
- Wood, Jason (2014). Last Words: Considering Contemporary Cinema. New York City: Columbia University Press. ISBN 978-0-231-17197-7.
