= Black River Falls Area Airport =

- IATA: none; ICAO: KBCK; FAA LID: BCK

Summary
- Airport type: Public
- Owner: Black River Falls and Jackson County
- Serves: Black River Falls, Wisconsin
- Opened: September 1970
- Time zone: CST (UTC−06:00)
  - Summer (DST): CDT (UTC−05:00)
- Elevation AMSL: 836 ft (255 m)
- Coordinates: 44°15′03″N 090°51′19″W

Map
- Location of airport in Wisconsin BCK (the United States)

Runways
Direction	Length		Surface
Direction	ft	m	Surface
8/26	4,601	1,402	Asphalt

Statistics
- Aircraft operations (2022): 1,500
- Based aircraft (2024): 14
- Source: Federal Aviation Administration

Black River Falls Area Airport (ICAO: KBCK, FAA LID: BCK) is a public use airport located three nautical miles (6 km) south of the central business district of Black River Falls, a city in Jackson County, Wisconsin, United States. It is owned by the city of Black River Falls and Jackson County.

It is included in the Federal Aviation Administration (FAA) National Plan of Integrated Airport Systems for 2025–2029, in which it is categorized as a basic general aviation facility.

Although most U.S. airports use the same three-letter location identifier for the FAA and IATA, this airport is assigned BCK by the FAA but has no designation from the IATA (which assigned BCK to Bolwarra, Queensland, Australia).

== Facilities and aircraft ==
Black River Falls Area Airport covers an area of 426 acres (172 ha) at an elevation of 836 feet (255 m) above mean sea level. It has one asphalt paved runway designated 8/26 which measures 4,601 by 75 feet (1,402 x 23 m).

For the 12-month period ending June 22, 2022, the airport had 1,500 aircraft operations, an average of 29 per week: 87% general aviation, 7% military and 7% air taxi. In July 2024, there were 14 aircraft based at this airport: 13 single-engine and 1 multi-engine.

A non-directional beacon, 362 kHz, ident: BCK is on field.

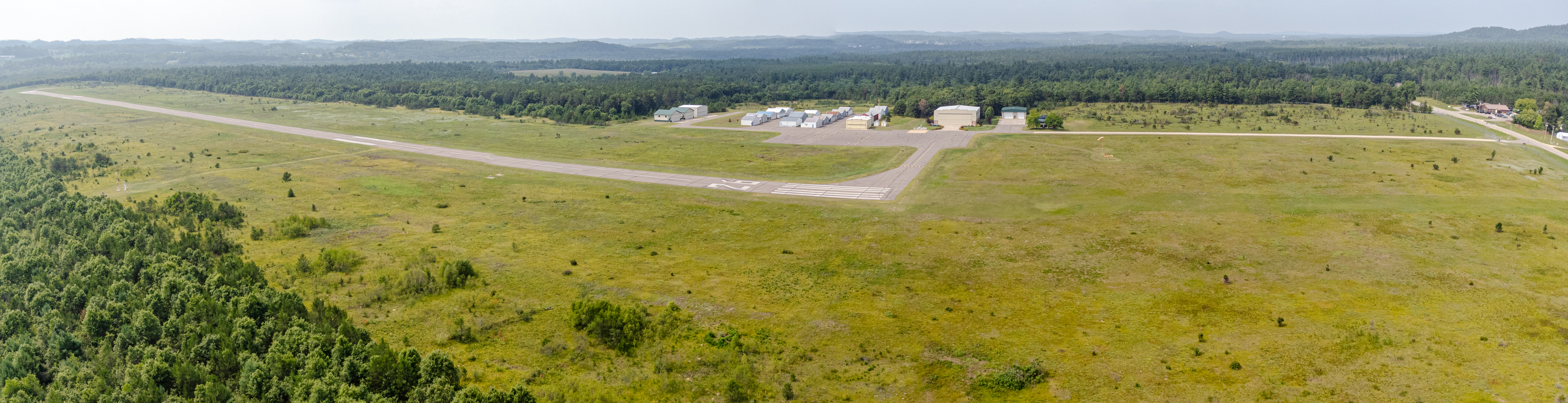
Black River Falls Area Airport

== See also ==
- List of airports in Wisconsin
