= WWIS =

WWIS may refer to:

- WWIS-FM, a radio station (99.7 FM) licensed to Black River Falls, Wisconsin, United States
- WWIS (AM), a radio station (1260 AM) licensed to Black River Falls, Wisconsin, United States
