= Oswald H. Johnson =

American businessman and politician

Oswald "Owa" H. Johnson (January 16, 1912 – July 30, 1993) was an American businessman and politician.

Born in Black River Falls, Wisconsin, Johnson received his doctorate degree from Carroll University and owned an insurance business in Black River Falls. He served on the Black River Falls Common Council and was a Republican. In 1943, Johnson served in the Wisconsin State Assembly. He died at his home in Black River Falls in 1993.
