= Casper D. Waller =

American politician from Wisconsin

Casper D. Waller (May 20, 1892 – March 6, 1959) was a member of the Wisconsin State Assembly.

== Biography ==
Waller was born on May 20, 1892, in Hixton, Wisconsin. He graduated from the School of the Art Institute of Chicago in 1914 and resided in Black River Falls, Wisconsin, where he worked as a salesman. He died of a heart attack in Black River Falls in 1959.

== Career ==
Waller was a member of the Assembly during the 1943, 1945, 1947 and 1949 sessions. Previously, he had been Register of Deeds of Jackson County, Wisconsin from 1936 to 1942. He was affiliated with the Wisconsin Progressive Party. Waller also worked as a cartoonist for the Republican Party.
