= Thomas Bever =

American psychologist and linguist

Thomas G. Bever
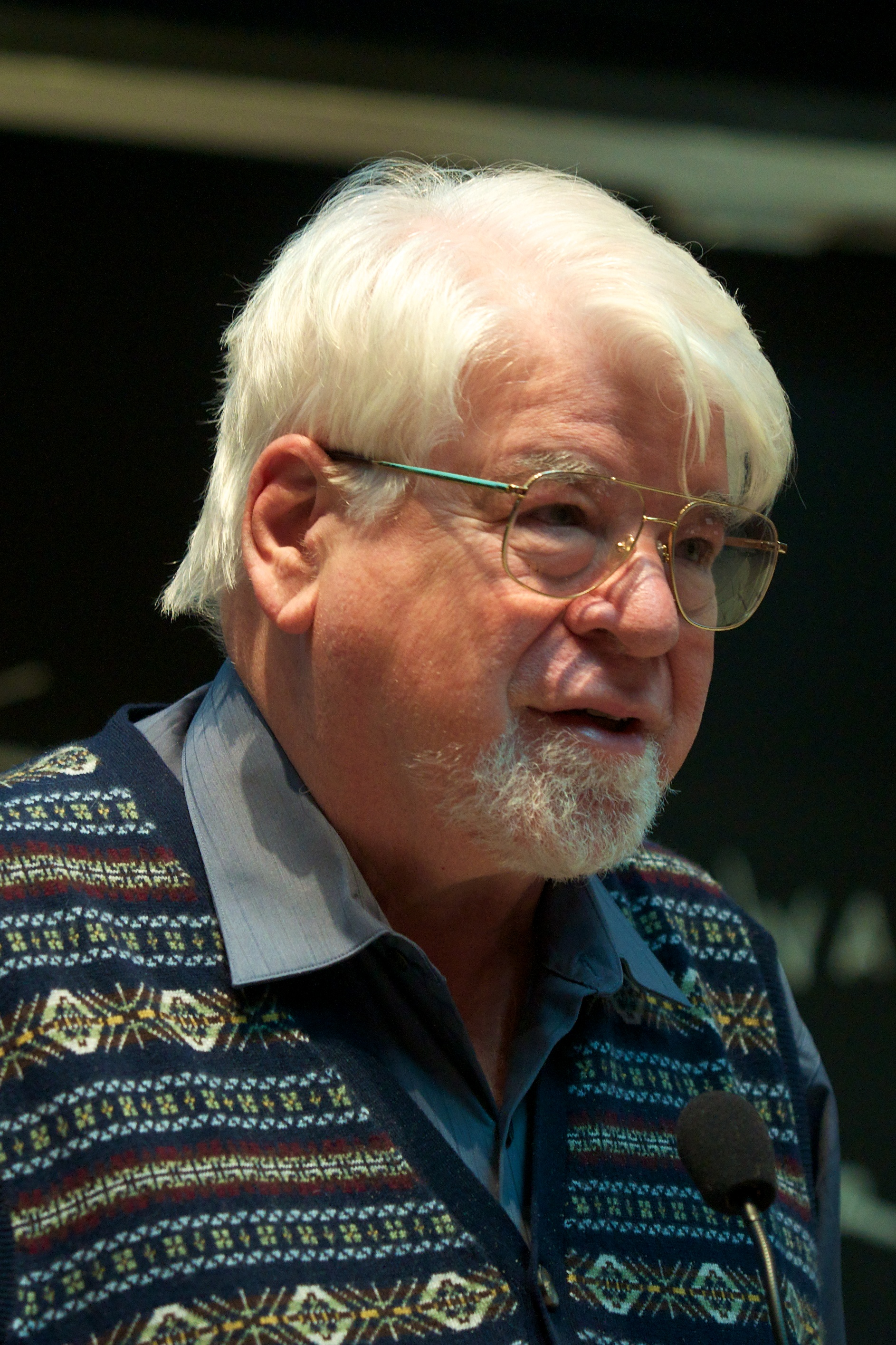
- Born: December 9, 1939 (age 86)
- Education: MIT, Harvard
- Scientific career
- Fields: Psycholinguistics, neurolinguistics, language acquisition
- Workplaces: University of Arizona, University of Rochester, Columbia University
- Doctoral advisor: Morris Halle

Thomas G. Bever (born December 9, 1939) is a Regent's Professor of Psychology, Linguistics, Cognitive Science, and Neuroscience at the University of Arizona. He has been a leading figure in psycholinguistics, focusing on the cognitive and neurological bases of linguistic universals, among other pursuits. Bever received a B.A. in linguistics and psychology from Harvard University in 1961, and a Ph.D. in linguistics from the Massachusetts Institute of Technology in 1967; he studied with Noam Chomsky, George A. Miller, and Jean Piaget. He taught at Rockefeller University from 1967 to 1969, Columbia University from 1970 to 1986 (where he was involved with Project Nim), and the University of Rochester from 1985 to 1995, before accepting his current position at the University of Arizona, where he has remained ever since.

Bever is notable for his study of garden path sentences such as The horse raced past the barn fell, as well as his analysis by synthesis model of sentence processing, developed with David Townsend. In recent decades, Bever has studied the differences in language processing between righthanders with familial handedness and righthanders without left-handed relatives. He was a co-founder of the journal Cognition.
