= Herbert S. Terrace =

Professor of Psychology (b. 1936)

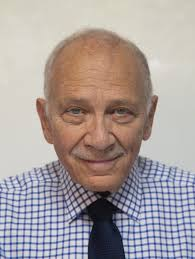
Herbert S. Terrace

Herbert S. Terrace (born 29 November 1936) is a professor of Psychology and Psychiatry at Columbia University. His work covers a broad set of research interests that include behaviorism, animal cognition, ape language and the evolution of language. He is the author of Nim: A Chimpanzee Who Learned Sign Language (1979) and Why Chimpanzees Can't Learn Language and Only Humans Can (2019). Terrace has made important contributions to comparative psychology, many of which have important implications for human psychology. These include discrimination learning, ape language, the evolution of language, and animal cognition.

== Background ==
=== Early life ===
Terrace was born and raised in Brooklyn as the youngest child of two Polish immigrants. He attended Stuyvesant High School in New York. His interest in science was instilled by an older sister, Dr. Dorothy Krieger, who won a Lasker Award for her research in endocrinology.

=== Education ===
Terrace obtained a Bachelor of Arts in psychology (1957) and a Master of Arts in Experimental Psychology (1958) from Cornell University, where he was a Josiah Macy, Jr. Foundation Fellow (1957–1958). His mentor during graduate studies was Julian Hochberg. He obtained his PhD in psychology (1961) from Harvard University, where his mentor was B. F. Skinner. At Harvard, he was a USPHS Pre-Doctoral Fellow (1959–1961)

== Contributions to psychological theory ==
=== Discrimination learning ===
Learning by trial and error is a basic feature of conditioning theory. For his doctoral dissertation, Terrace showed that it was possible to train a discrimination without any errors. He did this with pigeons who learned to discriminate two narrowly spaced stimuli by starting with a large distance between the discriminative stimuli that was gradually reduced. When a discrimination is trained with errors, subjects exhibit frustration. Such aversive effects are absent when a discrimination is trained without errors. Skinner cited a similar difference in the case of the teaching machine, a device he invented to train human subjects to learn different types of technical material. The teaching machine introduces a new topic with simple questions that are gradually made more difficult. Subjects who learn with few or no errors do not exhibit the frustration they would have experienced had they learned by trial and error.

=== Ape language and the evolution of language ===
Terrace joined other leading behaviorists challenging Noam Chomsky's theory that only humans can learn language and grammar. With Project Nim, he attempted to teach a chimpanzee (Nim Chimpsky), to learn American Sign Language (ASL). Sign language was used because of the physical limitations of a chimpanzee's vocal apparatus. Nim's vocabulary grew steadily and he began to combine signs. However, analyses of videotapes of Nim signing with his teachers showed that most of his signs were cued by a teacher's prompts.

Terrace concluded that the only reason Nim (and other chimpanzees) signed was to obtain rewards. Were it not for his teacher, Nim would try to grab a reward directly. When that failed, Nim's only alternative was to sign. Anticipating his signing, Nim's teachers unwittingly made one or more appropriate signs, about a quarter of a second before he signed. Terrace also showed that prompting explained the signing of other chimpanzees who were trained to use ASL.

Because chimpanzees only signed to obtain rewards, their signing was, by definition, limited to the imperative function of words. That differs fundamentally from its declarative function, which is to name objects conversationally. Imperatives are a minuscule portion of human vocabulary. If human communication were limited to imperatives, language would have never evolved. Initially, Terrace hoped that combinations of a chimpanzee's signs would provide evidence that it could create a sentence. What Project Nim showed, however, is that a chimpanzee cannot even use signs declaratively. Until a chimpanzee can learn words, he concluded that it's pointless to ask if it can create a sentence.

The negative results of Project Nim posed two questions: why can a chimpanzee not learn language, words in particular, and which of our ancestors was the first species to use words? To answer the first question, Terrace cited recent discoveries by developmental psychologists who showed that infants experience two non-verbal relations with their caretakers, intersubjectivity and joint attention, before they learn to name objects. He argued that the absence of those precursors in chimpanzees is the best explanation for their failure to learn words.

To answer the second question, Terrace integrated hypotheses by an anthropologist and a linguist who suggested that the caloric requirements of Homo erectus’ large brain was the motivation for their invention of words. Meat was the most efficient way to get those calories, necessitating Homo erectus hunt or scavenge large animals, primarily the latter. That required a group effort, in which a scout had to inform members of his group about the location of a dead animal they could not see. Because it required displaced reference, such communication was assumed to be the occasion for the first use of words.

Although Project Nim confirmed Chomsky's view that language is uniquely human, it showed that the use of grammar was not sufficient to distinguish language from animal communication. The use of words, specifically, the ability to name objects, was also necessary. Chomsky argued that grammar was the result of a recent mutation and that the origin of words remained a mystery. Terrace argued that language originated with words, which are as different from the signals that animals use to communicate as words are from grammar. Unlike Chomsky, who argued that language was the result of a mutation, Terrace argued that words could be explained by natural selection.

Terrace's research in Project Nim has been criticized for its research methodology and various ethical concerns, most notably, in Elizabeth Hess's Nim Chimpsky: The Chimp Who Would be Human (2008) and a documentary film based on the book, Project Nim (2011). Following the project's conclusion, Nim was effectively abandoned by Terrace, who visited the chimpanzee only once in spite of Nim's sale to a new facility, and his documented difficulties adapting to his new environment.

=== Animal cognition ===
Although chimpanzees cannot learn language, there is evidence that their behavior, and that of other animals, is more intelligent than behavior that could result from conditioning. Since Descartes, it has been generally accepted that animals cannot think because they do not have language. To explain intelligent behavior in animals without language and without the principles of conditioning, Terrace argued that it is necessary to show that they can represent objects, that is, solve a problem in the absence of external cues that can guide their behavior.

==== Serial learning ====
The simultaneous training paradigm differs from the traditional successive training paradigm in which subjects execute a sequence by responding to individual stimuli, which appear successively as, for example, learning which way to turn at successive choice points in a maze. When learning a sequence by the simultaneous training paradigm, monkeys were shown an array of photographs on a touch-sensitive video display. On each trial, the position of the photographs varied randomly. As a result, subjects could not rely on its physical location as an external cue for determining to which photograph it should respond first, second, and so on. Instead, they had to memorize the order of each photograph.

Because the simultaneous training paradigm requires the subject to represent each item's ordinal position, it provides an opportunity to study animal cognition. In the early 80s, Terrace helped organize an international conference on animal cognition at Columbia University that discussed the simultaneous training paradigm and other instances in which animals are able to represent stimuli. Since then, animal cognition has become a dominant area in comparative cognition. In 1985, Terrace began a primate cognition laboratory in which he studied how monkeys use representations in various serial learning tasks, for example, to respond in the correct order to ascending and descending series of numerically defined stimuli, to acquire serial expertise [the ability to become progressively better at learning arbitrary sequences] and to imitate another monkey's sequential performance.

==== Metacognition ====
Terrace also studied a monkey's ability to think about its own behavior, that is, its ability to engage in metacognition. In humans, metacognition is assessed by asking subjects how certain they are about their knowledge of a particular topic, for example, how well they did on an exam. To assess metacognition in monkeys, Terrace devised a task in which the monkeys had to place a “bet” that was commensurate with their confidence in the accuracy of a response on a cognitive task. Following each response, monkeys learned to select a “high confidence” symbol if their response was correct and a “low confidence” symbol after an error. They did so correctly even when the appearance of the confidence symbols was delayed for as much as 5 sec after a trial ended. This was the first demonstration that a monkey could think about its behavior.

== Honors and awards ==
- John Simon Guggenheim Fellowship, 1969–1970 (University of Sussex, England)
- Harry Frank Guggenheim Fellowship 1976–1977 (Columbia University)
- All Souls College Fellowship, 1983–1984 (Oxford University)
- Fulbright Senior Research Scholar, 1983–1984 (Oxford University)
- Election to Society of Experimental Psychologists, 1988
- Howard Crosby Warren Medal, Society of Experimental Psychologists, 2004
- Lifetime Achievement Award, Comparative Cognition Society, 2009

=== Grants ===
Since 1962, Terrace's research has been funded by grants from the NIH, NSF and the James McDonnell Foundation.

== See also ==
- Project Nim, a 2011 film that explores Terrace's work. The film offers critiques of Terrace, and he, in turn, offers critiques of the film's commentary.
