= Levis/Trow trail system =

Coordinates: 44.559867°N 90.615535°W

The Levis/Trow trail system is a 34-mile network of trails in Clark County, Wisconsin, United States, west of Neillsville, used for hiking, mountain biking, and cross-country skiing. It consists of two types of trails, doubletrack and singletrack. The doubletrack is groomed for cross-country skiing in winter. The singletrack is popular with mountain biking enthusiasts in summer and autumn.

The system is named for the Levis and Trow mounds that the trails circle and ascend. The mounds are monadnocks on the fringe of the Driftless Area. It is maintained by the Neillsville Area Trail Association and administered by the Clark County Forestry and Parks Department.
