= Michael Lesy =

American non-fiction writer (born 1945)

Michael Lesy (born 1945) is an American non-fiction writer. His books, which combine historical photographs with original writing, include Wisconsin Death Trip (1973), Real Life: Louisville in the Twenties (1976), Bearing Witness: A Photographic Chronicle of American Life (1982), Visible Light (1985), Murder City: The Bloody History of Chicago in the Twenties (2007), Repast: Dining Out at the Dawn of the New American Century (with Lisa Stoffer, 2013), Looking Backward: A Photographic Portrait of the World at the Beginning of the Twentieth Century (2017), and Snapshots 1971–77 (September 2021).

Lesy grew up in Shaker Heights, Ohio. He received a B.A. in theoretical sociology from Columbia University, an M.A. in American social history from the University of Wisconsin, and a Ph.D. in American cultural history from Rutgers University. He taught at Hampshire College, in Amherst, Massachusetts, from 1990 to 2020, and is a Hampshire emeritus professor of literary journalism.

Wisconsin Death Trip, Lesy's first book, was adapted into a film by James Marsh in 1999. Ironically, Lesy explained in a 2003 interview, "I wanted to make it a movie. But it cost too much to produce. So it was just a poor man’s way of making a movie in book form." Wisconsin Death Trip was presented on the BBC documentary series Arena in 2000.

In 2006 the United States Artists Foundation named Lesy its first Simon Fellow. In 2013 Lesy was awarded a Guggenheim Fellowship for Photography Studies.

== Bibliography ==
Year	Title	Publisher
1973	Wisconsin Death Trip	Pantheon Books
1976	Real Life: Louisville in the Twenties	Pantheon Books
1980	Time Frames: The Meaning of Family Pictures	Pantheon Books
1982	Bearing Witness: A Photographic Chronicle of American Life	Pantheon Books
1985	Visible Light	Crown Publishing Group
1987	The Forbidden Zone	Farrar, Straus, and Giroux
1991	Rescues: The Lives of Heroes	Farrar, Straus, and Giroux
1997	Dreamland: America at the Dawn of the Twentieth Century	The New Press
2002	Long Time Coming: A Photographic Portrait of America, 1935-1943	W. W. Norton & Company
2005	Angel's World: The New York Photographs of Angelo Rizzuto	W. W. Norton & Company
2007	Murder City: The Bloody History of Chicago in the Twenties	W. W. Norton & Company
2013	Repast: Dining Out at the Dawn of the New American Century (with Lisa Stoffer)	W. W. Norton & Company
2017	Looking Backward: A Photographic Portrait of the World at the Beginning of the Twentieth Century	W. W. Norton & Company
2021	Snapshots 1971–77 (September 17 scheduled publication)	Blast Books
