= Union High School (Black River Falls, Wisconsin) =

- U.S. National Register of Historic Places
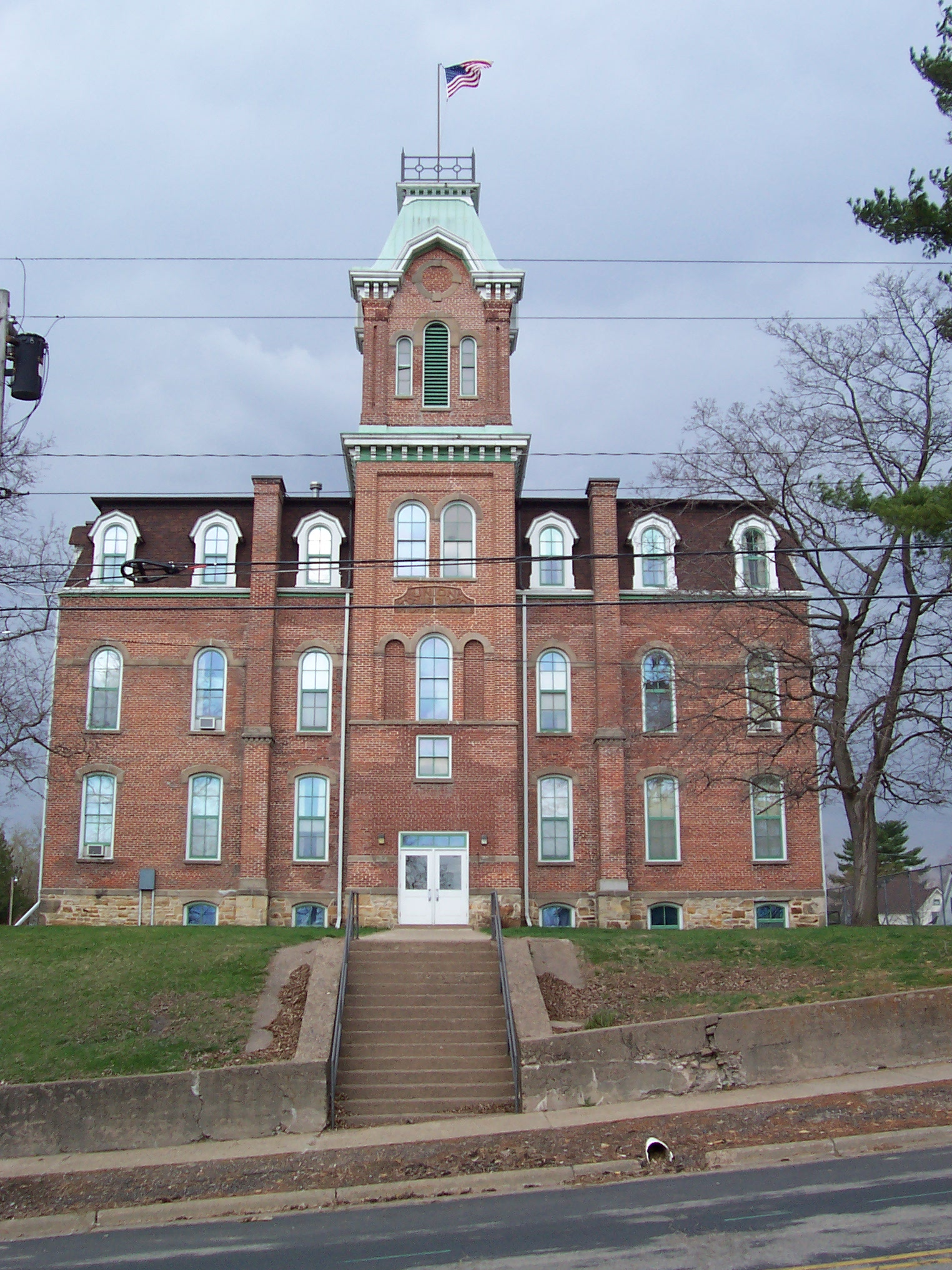
- Location: N. 3rd St./223 N. Fourth St., Black River Falls, Wisconsin
- Coordinates: 44°17′51″N 90°51′05″W
- Area: 0.1 acres (0.040 ha)
- Built: 1871
- Architect: W. H. J. Nichols
- Architectural style: Second Empire
- NRHP reference No.: 78000103
- Added to NRHP: January 20, 1978

The Union High School building is located in Black River Falls, Wisconsin.

== History ==
The building was used as a high school until 1897. Since then, it was used as an elementary school and currently for housing for elderly people. It was listed on the National Register of Historic Places in 1978 and on the State Register of Historic Places in 1989.
