= James Marsh (director) =

British film and documentary director (born 1963)

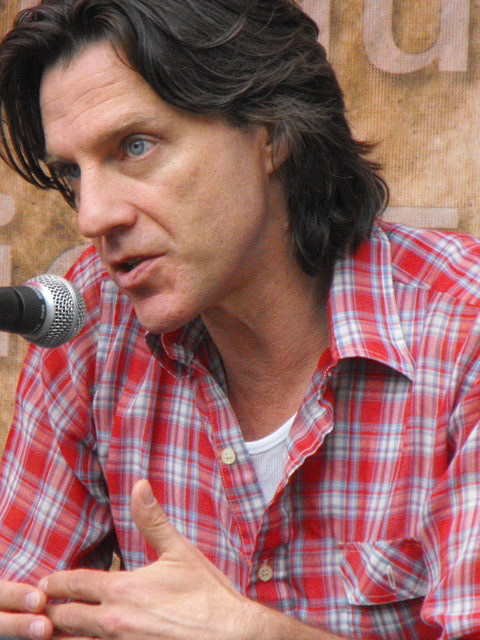
- Marsh in 2009
- Born: 30 April 1963 (age 63); Truro, Cornwall, England
- Education: St Catherine's College, Oxford
- Occupations: Director, author
- Children: 2

James Marsh (born 30 April 1963) is a British film and documentary director best known for his work on Man on Wire, which won the 2008 Academy Award for Best Documentary Feature, and The Theory of Everything, the biopic of physicist Stephen Hawking released in 2014.

== Early life ==
Marsh was born in Truro, Cornwall and raised in Sennen, a Cornish village, and Woolwich, a district in southeast London. In Woolwich, he lived in a "miserable council flat" with his family.

Marsh won a scholarship to the University of Oxford. As an undergraduate, he studied at St Catherine's College, Oxford and graduated with a degree in English.

== Career ==
Marsh began his early career in directing with several documentaries made for the BBC. His first TV documentary was the 90-minute Troubleman – The Last Years of Marvin Gaye, and was followed by the 26-minute 1990 documentary The Animator of Prague starring Jan Švankmajer and his works. Later came The Burger and the King: The Life and Cuisine of Elvis Presley, which was made in 1995 and released in 1996, and the Welsh musician John Cale, which was made in 1998 and released in 1999. His relationship continued with the BBC as a director and producer for three Arena series episodes, including the celebrated film Wisconsin Death Trip (1999).

In 2005 he directed the film The King which was screened in the Un Certain Regard section at the 2005 Cannes Film Festival.

In 2008 he made the documentary Man on Wire, about Philippe Petit's walk between the Twin Towers of the World Trade Center in New York. Marsh based Man on Wire, in part, on Philippe Petit’s memoir To Reach the Clouds. Man on Wire won the Academy Award for Best Documentary Feature at the 81st annual Oscars, the BAFTA Award for Best British film, the Independent Spirit Award, and many others. The film, called "exhilarating", has had a hugely positive audience response and was among the Top Ten Films of 2008 on many critics' lists.

In 2009, he directed the "1980" episode of Red Riding, which aired on Channel 4 in the UK.

He also directed Project Nim in 2010, which is based on the book Nim Chimpsky: The Chimp Who Would Be Human by Elizabeth Hess. It is a documentary about the landmark study conducted by Herbert S. Terrace on the subject of great ape language acquisition and the subject of the study is a chimpanzee named Nim Chimpsky. Marsh watched different films to gain inspiration before making Project Nim. He watched E.T., Frederick Wiseman's Primate, and the Bresson film Au hasard Balthazar. He gained the most information from Au hasard Balthazar, a fictional account of a donkey as it passes through various human owners. The structure of Project Nim reflects a lot from this film as we see the drama of the human world through the eyes of the chimpanzee.

In 2012, he directed Shadow Dancer, a joint Irish/UK production about the Irish republican movement, which was filmed in Dublin and London. The film features Clive Owen, Andrea Riseborough, Gillian Anderson, Domhnall Gleeson and Aidan Gillen.

Marsh directed The Theory of Everything released in 2014, a biopic on Stephen Hawking starring Eddie Redmayne and Felicity Jones. Marsh received a nomination for the BAFTA for Best Director and the film was nominated for five Academy Awards including Best Picture.

== Personal life ==
Marsh currently lives in Copenhagen with his two daughters and his wife.

== Filmography ==
Film

Year	Title	Director	Writer
2005	The Team	No	Yes
2005	The King	Yes	Yes
2012	Shadow Dancer	Yes	No
2014	The Theory of Everything	Yes	No
2017	The Mercy	Yes	No
2018	King of Thieves	Yes	No
2023	Dance First	Yes	No

Miniseries

Year	Title	Notes
2009	Red Riding	Segment "1980"
2016	The Night Of	Episode "The Art of War"

Documentary film

Year	Title	Director	Writer	Producer
1999	Wisconsin Death Trip	Yes	Yes	Yes
2008	Man on Wire	Yes	No	No
2011	Project Nim	Yes	No	No

== Accolades ==
List of awards and nominations
Year	Award / film Festival	Category	Work	Result	Ref(s)
2000	San Sebastian Film Festival	San Sebastián International Film Festival FIPRESCI Prize – Special Mention	Wisconsin Death Trip	Won	
2000	Stockholm Film Festival	Stockholm Film Festival Bronze Horse	Wisconsin Death Trip	Nominated	
2001	BAFTA Award	BAFTA TV Award for Specialised Programme or Series	Wisconsin Death Trip	Nominated	
2006	Gotham Awards	Breakthrough Director	The King	Nominated	
2006	Philadelphia Film Festival	Philadelphia Film Festival American Independents Award	The King	Won	
2008	Alliance of Women Film Journalists	Best Documentary	Man on Wire	Won	
2008	Directors Guild of America	Best Director - Documentary	Man on Wire	Nominated	
2008	European Film Awards	Best Documentary	Man on Wire	Nominated	
2008	Gotham Independent Film Awards 2008	Best Documentary	Man on Wire	Nominated	
2009	Academy Awards	Best Documentary	Man on Wire	Won	
2009	BAFTA Award	Best British Film	Man on Wire	Won	
2009	Cinema Eye Honors	Best Film-Making	Man on Wire	Won	
2009	Cinema Eye Honors	Best Director	Man on Wire	Nominated	
2009	Cinema Eye Honors	Audience Choice Prize	Man on Wire	Nominated	
2009	Independent Spirit Awards	Best Documentary	Man on Wire	Won	
2011	Alliance of Women Film Journalists	Best Documentary	Project Nim	Nominated	
2011	Boston Society of Film Critics Awards 2011	Best Documentary	Project Nim	Won	
2011	Directors Guild of America	Best Director - Documentary	Project Nim	Won	
2012	BAFTA Award	Best Documentary	Project Nim	Nominated	
2012	Cinema Eye Honors	Best Film-Making	Project Nim	Nominated	
2012	Cinema Eye Honors	Audience Choice Prize	Project Nim	Nominated	
2012	Evening Standard British Film Awards	Best Documentary	Project Nim	Nominated	
2012	Dinard British Film Festival	Golden Hitchcock Award	Shadow Dancer	Won	
2012	Dinard British Film Festival	Audience Award	Shadow Dancer	Won	
2012	Edinburgh International Film Festival	Best Feature Film	Shadow Dancer	Nominated	
2012	Film by the Sea International Film Festival	Film Award	Shadow Dancer	Nominated	
2013	Humanitas Prize	Best Documentary	Man on Wire	Nominated	
2015	BAFTA Award	Best British Film	The Theory of Everything	Won	
2015	BAFTA Award	Best Director	The Theory of Everything	Nominated	
2016	Primetime Emmy Awards	Outstanding Directing for a Limited Series, Movie, or Dramatic Special	The Night Of	Nominated	
