= Brockway =

Brockway may refer to:

== Places ==
In the United States:

- Brockway, California
- Brockway, Montana
- Brockway, Oregon
- Brockway, Pennsylvania
- Brockway, Wisconsin, a town
  - Brockway (community), Wisconsin, an unincorporated community
- Brockway Township, Michigan
- Brockway Township, Minnesota

== People ==
- Archibald Fenner Brockway, British anti-war activist and politician
- Buzz Brockway, American politician
- Benjamin Benson Brockway, Oregon pioneer
- Derek Brockway, Welsh meteorologist and TV presenter
- Hiel Brockway, Businessman
- Lawrence O. Brockway, Physical chemist
- Robin Brockway, British actor
- Zebulon Brockway, penologist and prison reformer
- Anna Medora Brockway Gray, Michigan physician and writer

== Other ==
- Brockway Air, Vermont-based regional airline
- Brockway Airport, New Brunswick, Canada
- Brockway Motor Company, Cortland NY 1912-1977
- Brockway Mountain Drive, scenic drive on the Keweenaw Peninsula of Michigan, USA
- Brockway (The Simpsons), fictional location on the TV animated series The Simpsons
- Brockway Glass, Pennsylvania-based glass manufacturer
