= Senator Potter =

Senator Potter

== Members of the United States Senate ==
- Charles E. Potter (1916–1979), U.S. Senator from Michigan from 1952 to 1959
- Samuel J. Potter (1753–1804), U.S. Senator from Rhode Island from 1803 to 1804

== United States state senate members ==
- Calvin Potter (born 1945), Wisconsin State Senate
- Emery D. Potter (1804–1896), Ohio State Senate
- John M. Potter (1924–1993), Wisconsin State Senate
- L. E. Potter (1858–1942), Minnesota Senate
- Robert L. D. Potter (1833–1893), Wisconsin State Senate
- Tracy Potter (born 1950), North Dakota State Senate
- William W. Potter (Michigan politician) (1869–1940), Michigan State Senate

== Others ==
- Osbert Potter (born 1956), Senate of the U.S. Virgin Islands
