= Green Lake, Wisconsin =

- City
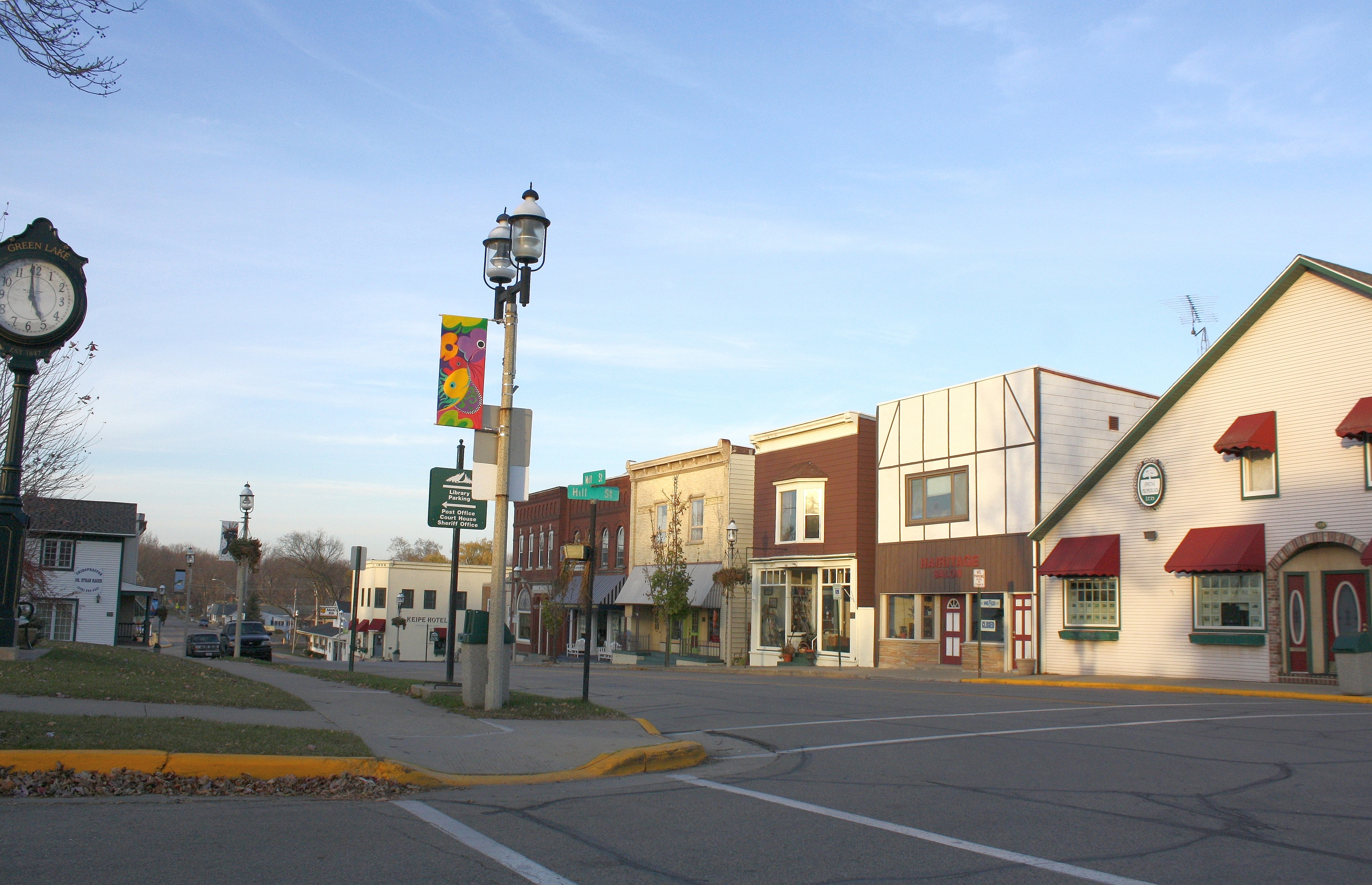
- Looking north at downtown Green Lake

- Location of Green Lake in Green Lake County, Wisconsin.

- Location within Wisconsin Location within the United States
- Coordinates: 43°50′39″N 88°57′36″W
- Country: United States
- State: Wisconsin
- County: Green Lake

Area
  - Total: 1.88 sq mi (4.86 km^{2})
  - Land: 1.85 sq mi (4.79 km^{2})
  - Water: 0.027 sq mi (0.07 km^{2})
- Elevation: 804 ft (245 m)

Population (2020)
  - Total: 1,001
  - Density: 541.3/sq mi (208.98/km^{2})
- Time zone: UTC-6 (Central (CST))
  - Summer (DST): UTC-5 (CDT)
- ZIP Code: 54941
- Area code: 920
- FIPS code: 55-31300
- GNIS feature ID: 1565822
- Website: cityofgreenlake.com

Green Lake is a city in, and the county seat of, Green Lake County, Wisconsin, United States. The city had a population of 1,001 in the 2020 census. It is located on the north side of Green Lake. The Town of Green Lake is located on the south side of Big Green Lake, opposite the city.

== Geography ==
According to the United States Census Bureau, the city has a total area of 2.06 square miles (5.34 km^{2}), of which 1.79 square miles (4.64 km^{2}) is land and 0.27 square miles (0.70 km^{2}) is water. Green Lake is the second deepest inland lake overall in Wisconsin, second only to the man-made Wazee Lake near Black River Falls. Measuring 239 feet deep at its greatest depth, Green Lake is the deepest natural inland lake in the state of Wisconsin.

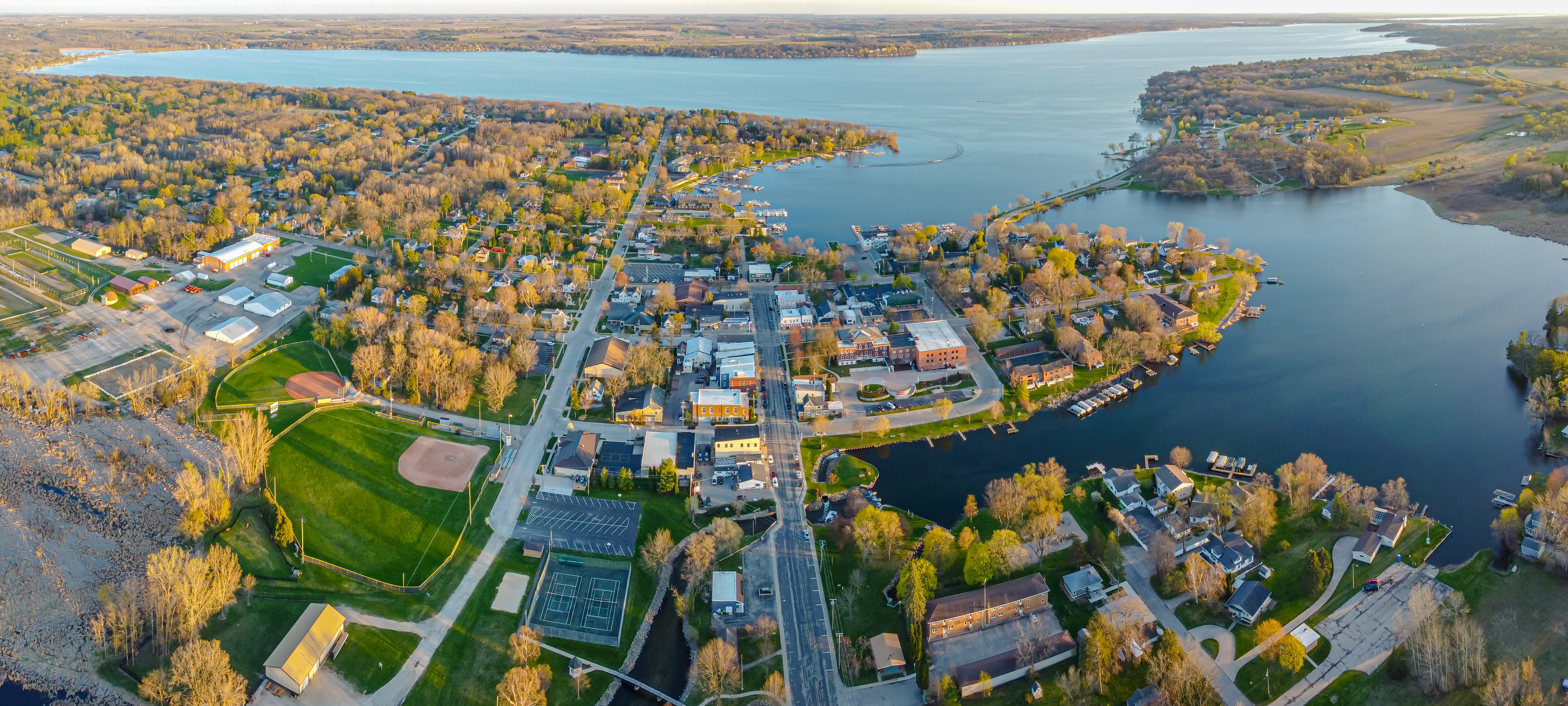
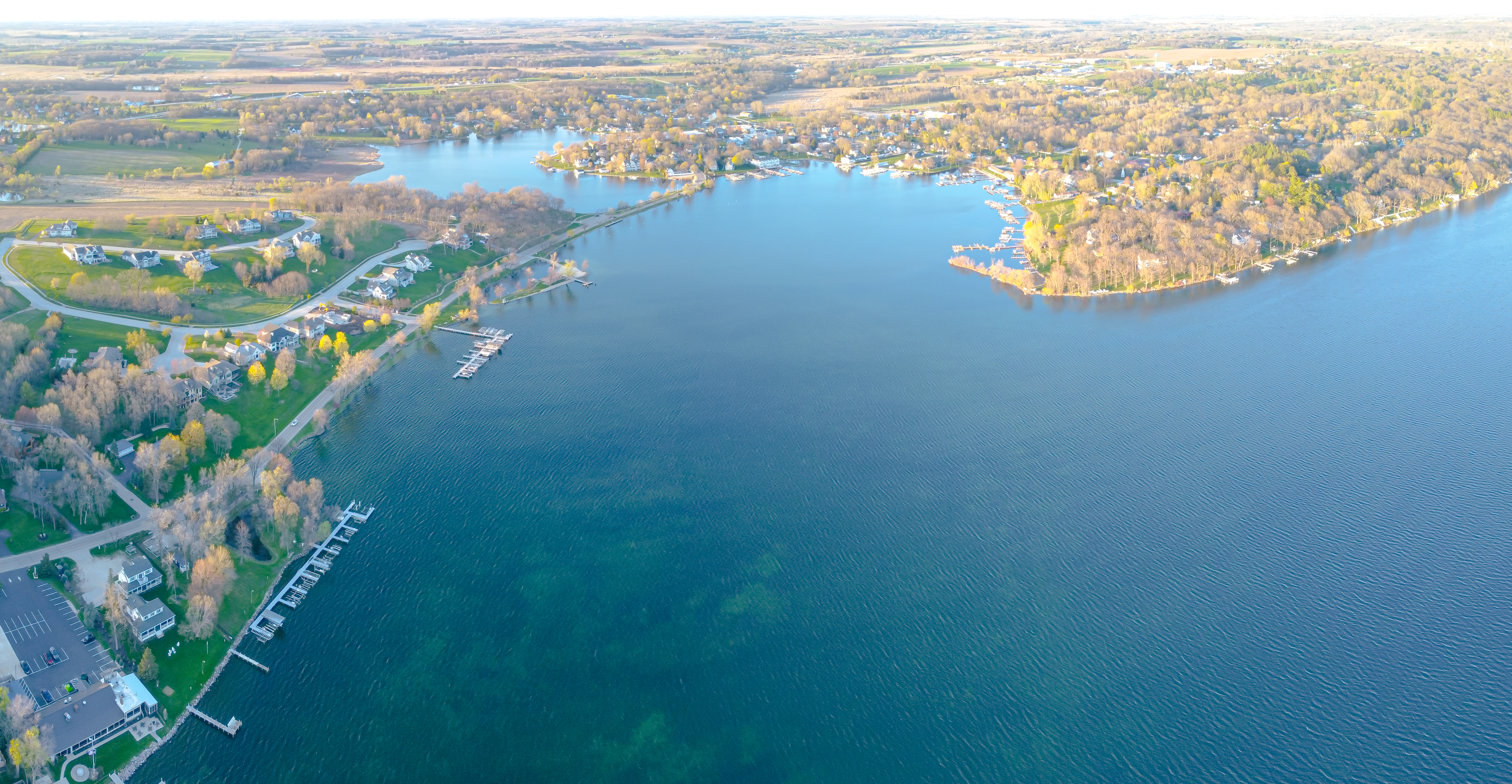

== Demographics ==
Historical population
Census	Pop.	Note	%±
1880	241		—
1890	204		−15.4%
1900	450		120.6%
1910	563		25.1%
1920	456		−19.0%
1930	569		24.8%
1940	661		16.2%
1950	728		10.1%
1960	953		30.9%
1970	1,109		16.4%
1980	1,208		8.9%
1990	1,064		−11.9%
2000	1,100		3.4%
2010	960		−12.7%
2020	1,001		4.3%
U.S. Decennial Census

=== 2010 census ===
As of the census of 2010, there were 960 people, 491 households, and 254 families living in the city. The population density was 536.3 inhabitants per square mile (207.1/km^{2}). There were 766 housing units at an average density of 427.9 per square mile (165.2/km^{2}). The racial makeup of the city was 98.8% White, 0.2% African American, 0.2% Native American, 0.3% Asian, 0.1% from other races, and 0.4% from two or more races. Hispanic or Latino of any race were 1.9% of the population.

There were 491 households, of which 15.1% had children under the age of 18 living with them, 40.3% were married couples living together, 8.4% had a female householder with no husband present, 3.1% had a male householder with no wife present, and 48.3% were non-families. 43.2% of all households were made up of individuals, and 17.7% had someone living alone who was 65 years of age or older. The average household size was 1.88 and the average family size was 2.56.

The median age in the city was 50.7 years. 14.1% of residents were under the age of 18; 6.9% were between the ages of 18 and 24; 19.5% were from 25 to 44; 35.1% were from 45 to 64; and 24.5% were 65 years of age or older. The gender makeup of the city was 50.8% male and 49.2% female.

=== 2000 census ===
As of the census of 2000, there were 1,100 people, 523 households, and 300 families living in the city. The population density was 787.2 people per square mile (303.4/km^{2}). There were 732 housing units at an average density of 523.8 per square mile (201.9/km^{2}). The racial makeup of the city was 98.91% White, 0.18% Black or African American, 0.09% Native American, 0.27% from other races, and 0.55% from two or more races. 0.91% of the population were Hispanic or Latino of any race.

There were 523 households, out of which 20.5% had children under the age of 18 living with them, 48.8% were married couples living together, 7.1% had a female householder with no husband present, and 42.6% were non-families. 38.0% of all households were made up of individuals, and 20.1% had someone living alone who was 65 years of age or older. The average household size was 2.04 and the average family size was 2.71.

In the city, the population was spread out, with 18.5% under the age of 18, 5.9% from 18 to 24, 25.9% from 25 to 44, 26.8% from 45 to 64, and 22.8% who were 65 years of age or older. The median age was 45 years. For every 100 females, there were 100.4 males. For every 100 females age 18 and over, there were 94.8 males.

The median income for a household in the city was $35,435, and the median income for a family was $49,091. Males had a median income of $31,591 versus $23,917 for females. The per capita income for the city was $20,444. About 4.1% of families and 5.9% of the population were below the poverty line, including 8.5% of those under age 18 and 5.6% of those age 65 or over.

== Arts and culture ==
=== Tourism ===
Green Lake is known for its fishing and recreational tourist community during the summer months. Area activities include camping, biking, fishing, hiking, golfing, swimming, and boating. Motorized water sports such as waterskiing, wakeboarding, and tubing are also prevalent. As are sports like sailing, canoeing, and kayaking. The small town has a number of shops and restaurants that serve Green Lake fish.

One of the oldest businesses is the family-owned Wallenfangs of Green Lake, established in 1975 and nestled just north of downtown Green Lake on 24 acres of what was once the historic Thrasher farm. Since that humble beginning in 1975, the business has grown from the cheese haus, ice cream parlor, and antiques shop, to include a gallery loft of fine art and furniture.

Green Lake is also home to several parks for public enjoyment.

- Deacon Mills Park is located on South Lawson Drive at the Marina and has a band shell, picnic facilities, and ice skating in the winter.
- Highknocker Park is located in downtown Green lake and had a baseball field and playground equipment.
- Friday Club Park is also located downtown and has public tennis courts and a fishing area.
- Hattie Sherwood Park is located on the north lakeshore and has a sand swimming beach, a pier, and a camping area.
- Sunset Park is located on the east end of Green Lake and has a boat launch, swimming beach, picnic area and pier.

Nearby is the Green Lake Conference Center, which was founded by the American Baptist Churches USA in 1943. Also near the conference center are the Golf Courses of Lawsonia, built on the former estate of Victor F. Lawson, the owner and publisher of the Chicago Daily News.

The Dartford Cemetery, located in Green Lake, has been a focus of reported paranormal activity in the area. Some visitors to the cemetery claim to have been tripped by ghosts or "pushed off" the mausoleum when sitting or standing on it, even seeing apparitions of child victims who died of a disease (possibly polio) or a Native American chief. These sightings and experiences have been featured in the episode "Legend Trippers" of the Discovery Channel's A Haunting series.

== Education ==
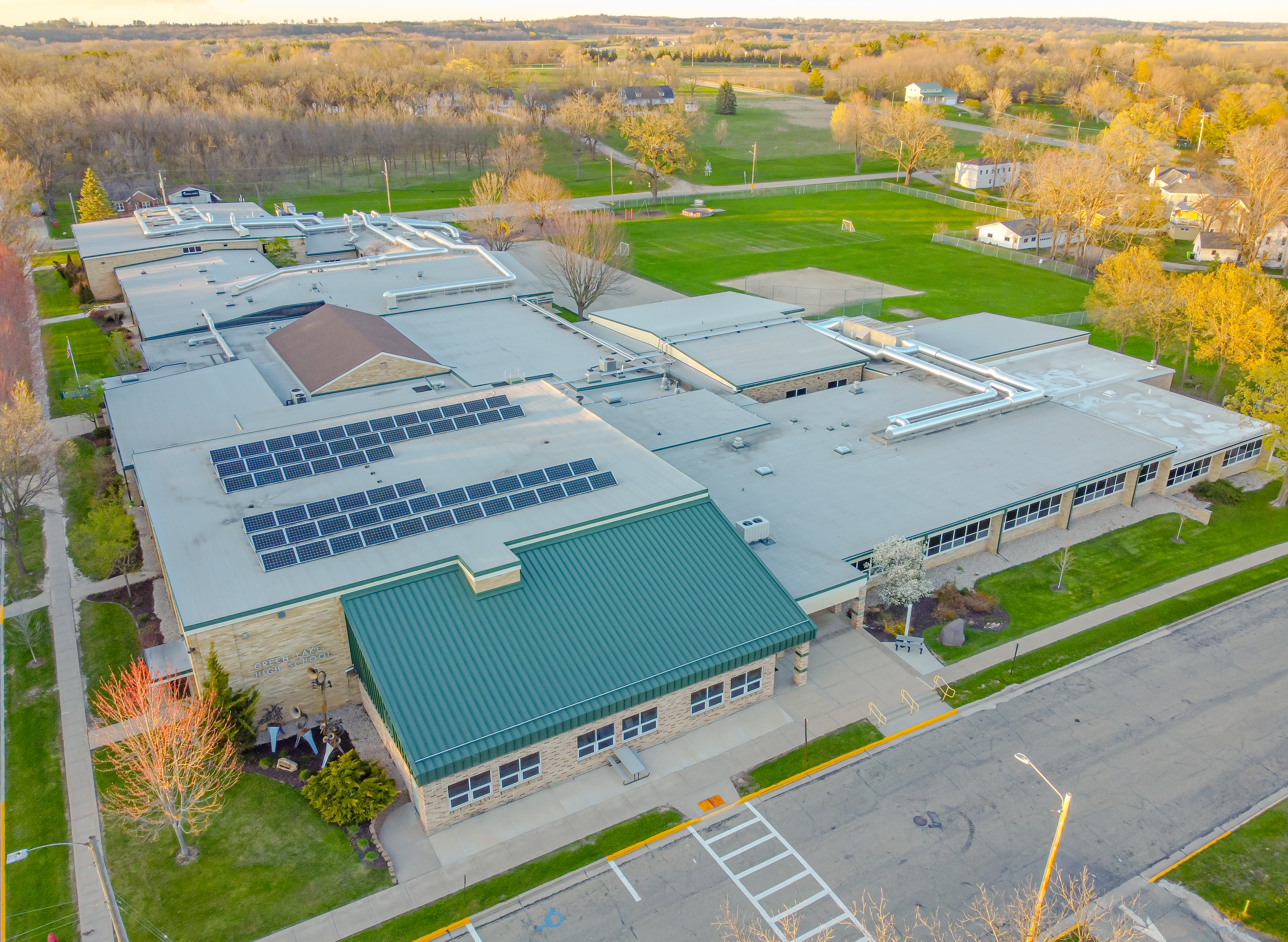
Green Lake High School

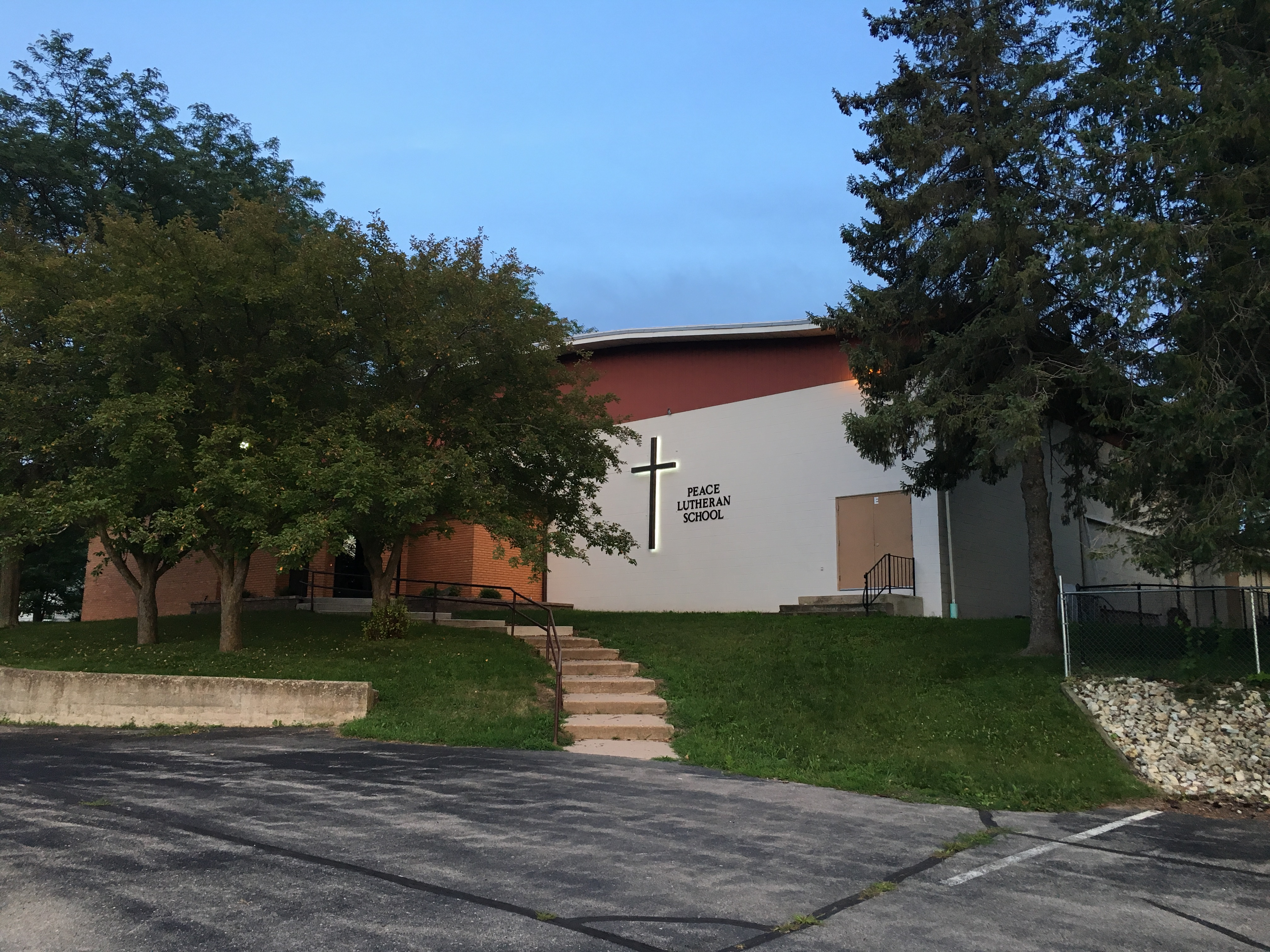
Peace Lutheran School

Education is administered by the Green Lake School District. Green Lake Elementary School and Green Lake Secondary School are both located in the same building in Green Lake. The district is the only 4k-12 International Baccalaureate World School in Wisconsin.

Peace Lutheran School is a K-8 Christian school of the Wisconsin Evangelical Lutheran Synod (WELS) in Green Lake.

== Infrastructure ==
=== Transportation ===
Green Lake is served by the state highways of WIS 23 and WIS 49 as well as Business 23. Business 23 runs through town while Wis 23 bypasses Green Lake on the north side. Wis 23 heads west to Princeton. Wis 49 heads north to Berlin. Wis 23 East and Wis 49 South head to Ripon. Green Lake County Hwy A also enters town.

== Notable people ==
- Elda Emma Anderson, physicist
- Halbert W. Brooks, Wisconsin State Representative
- Adrian Karsten, sports television reporter
- Samuel Owens, Wisconsin State Representative and architect
- L. E. Potter, Minnesota State Senator
- Janika Vandervelde, composer
- Shannon Whirry, Actress

== Popular culture ==
- A season 4 episode of the Discovery Channel series A Haunting, called Legend Trippers, takes place in Green Lake and the nearby town of Montello.
- In the Ray Bradbury story "Mars is Heaven!," which aired on the 07/07/1950 episode of the radio program Dimension X, the illusory town created by Martians to deceive the astronauts is referred to as Green Lake, Wisconsin.

== Gallery ==
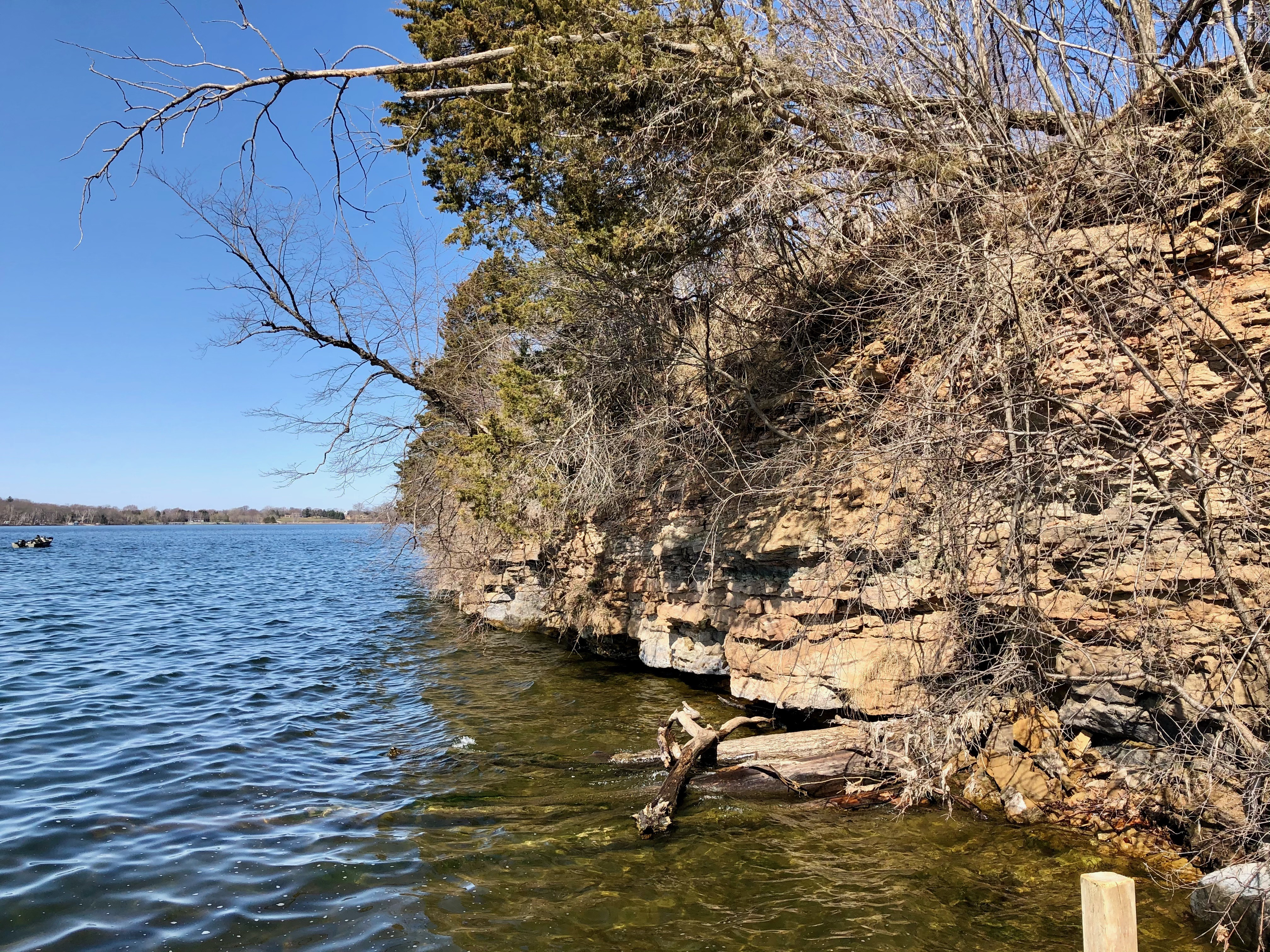
The shoreline of Green Lake along Lone Tree Point

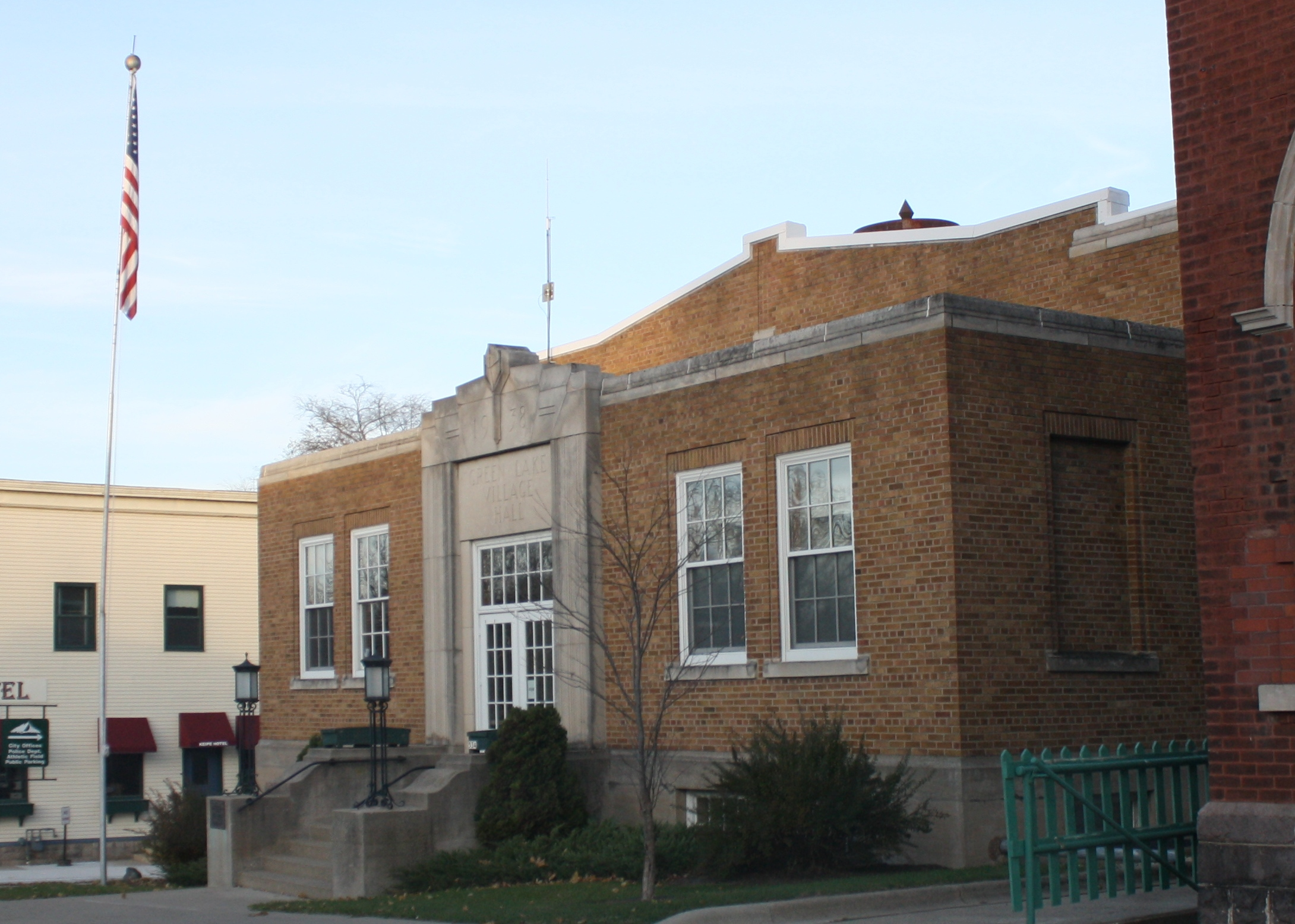
Green Lake Village Hall

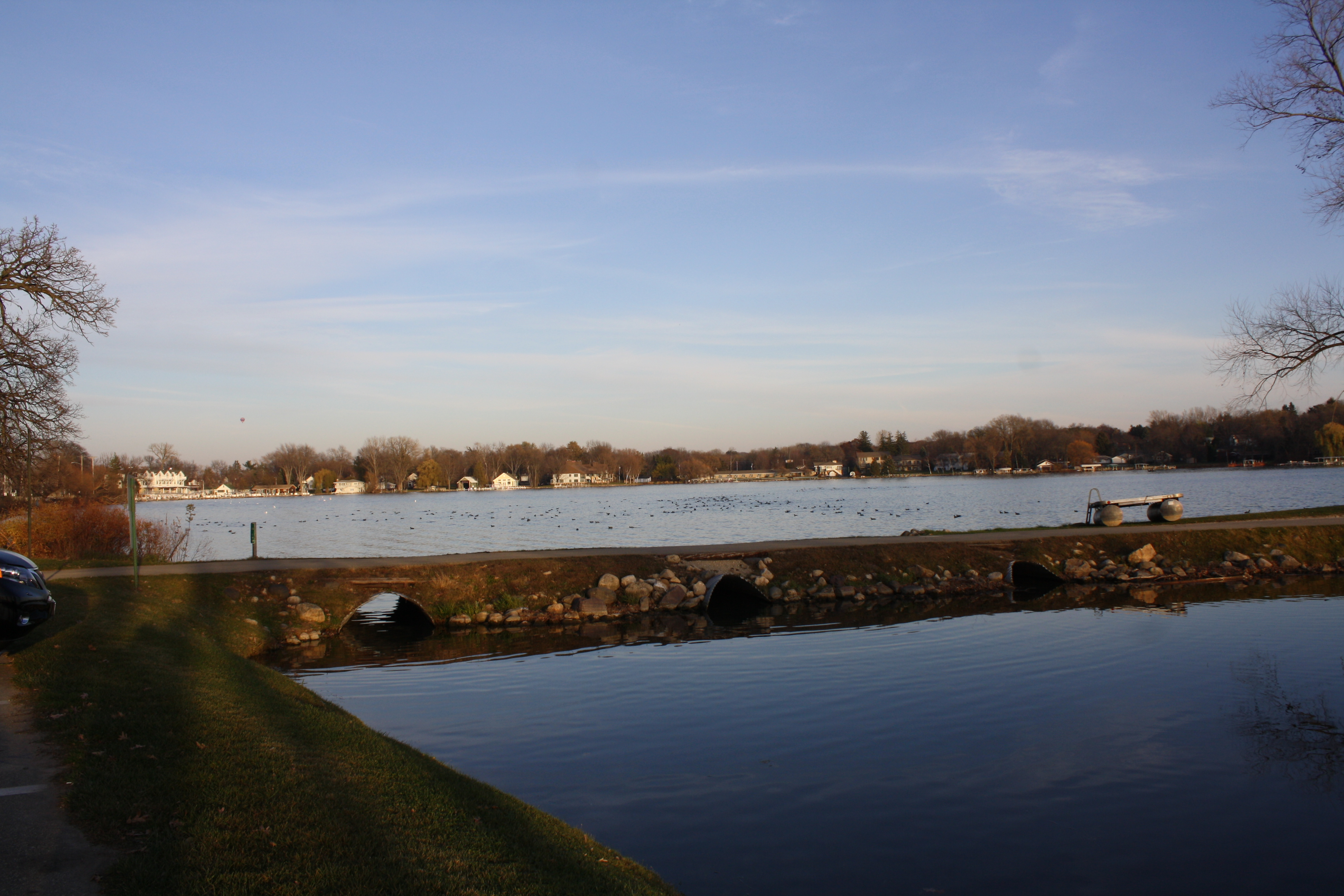
Panorama over Green Lake just off Business 23

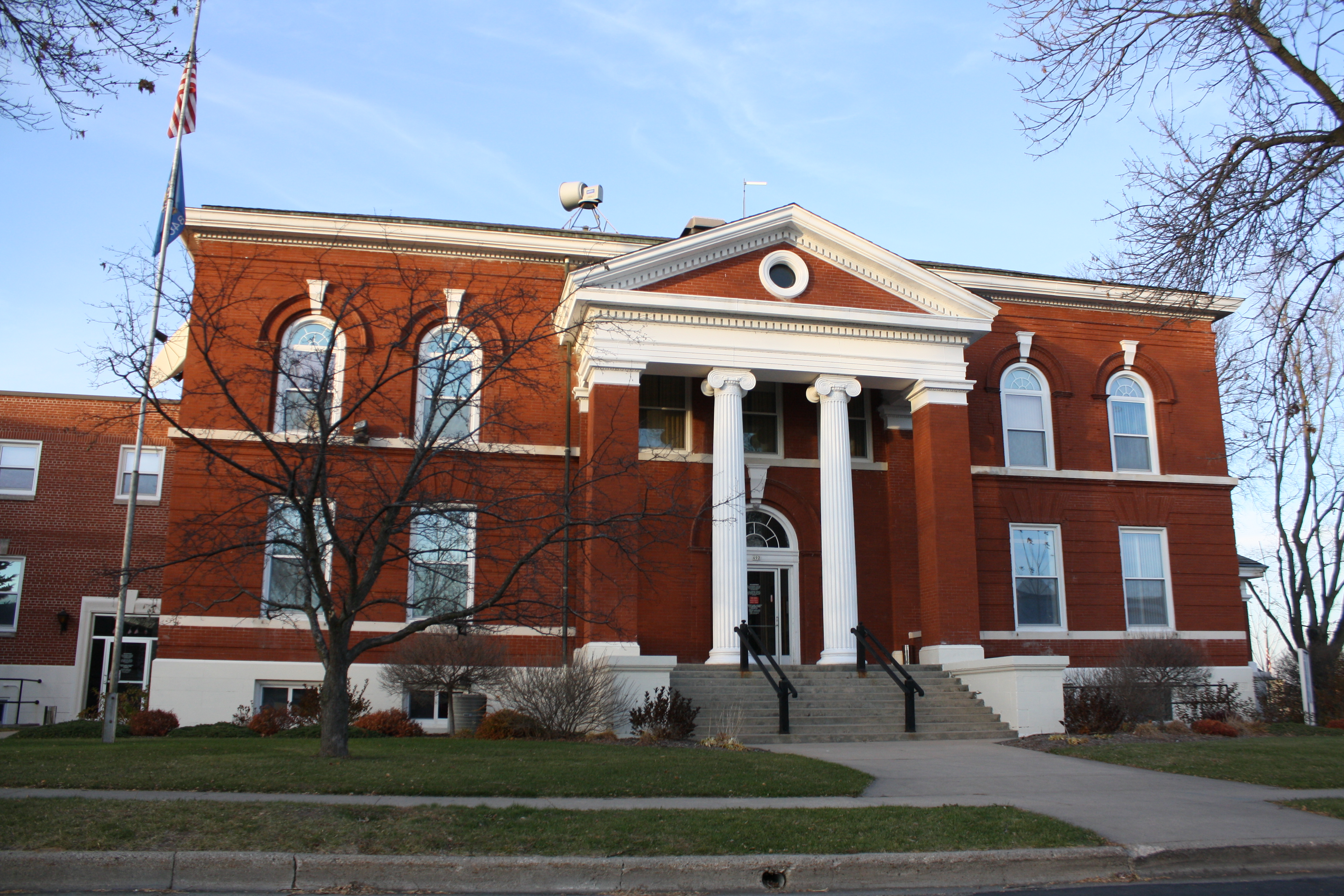
Green Lake County Courthouse in downtown Green Lake

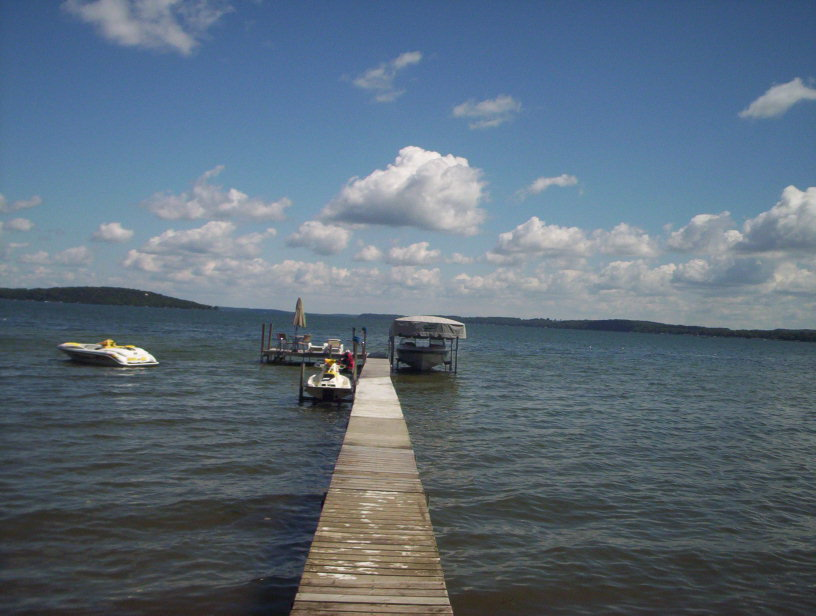
Green Lake, Wisconsin from the west end

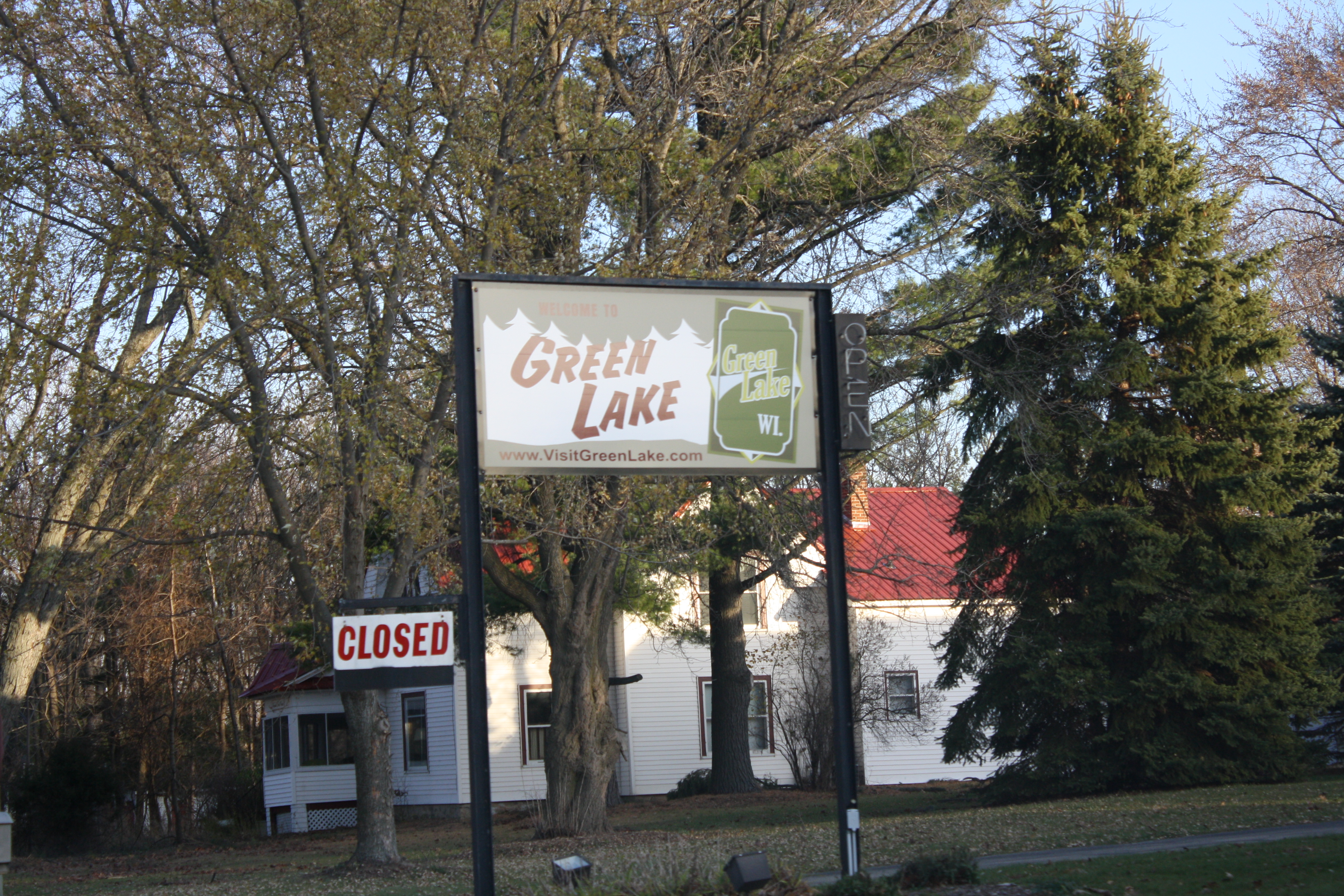
City welcome sign

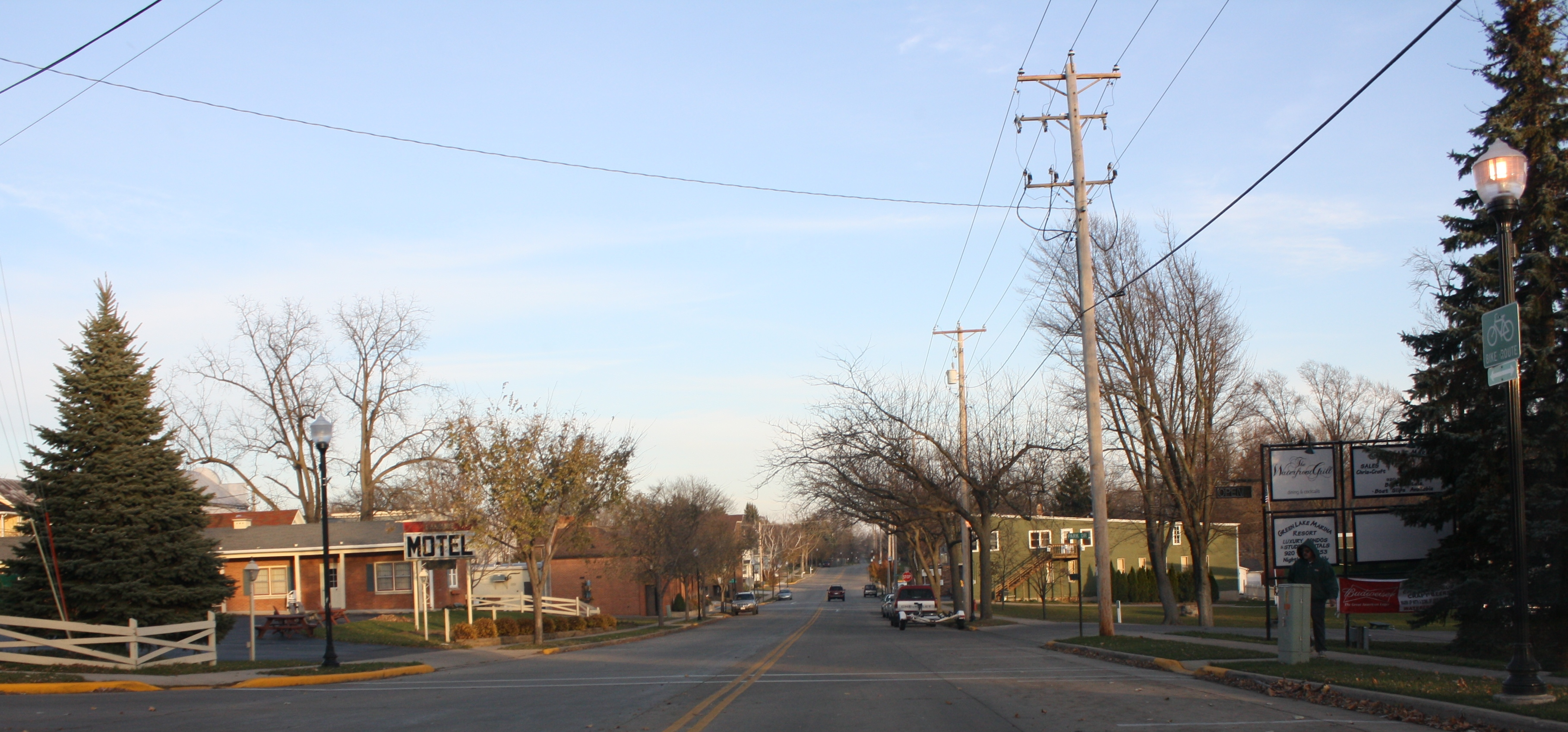
Looking east in downtown Green Lake

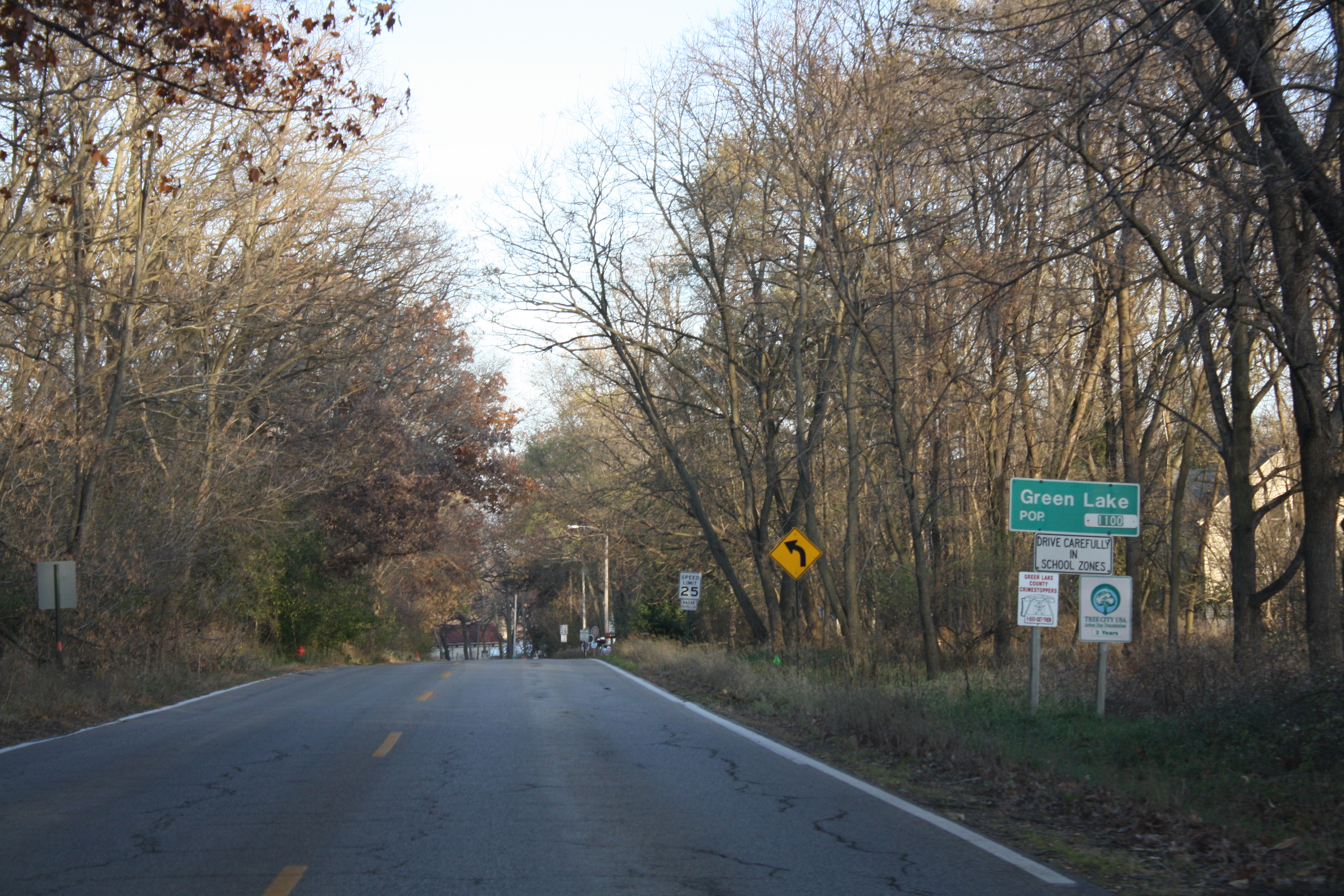
West side welcome sign on Business 23

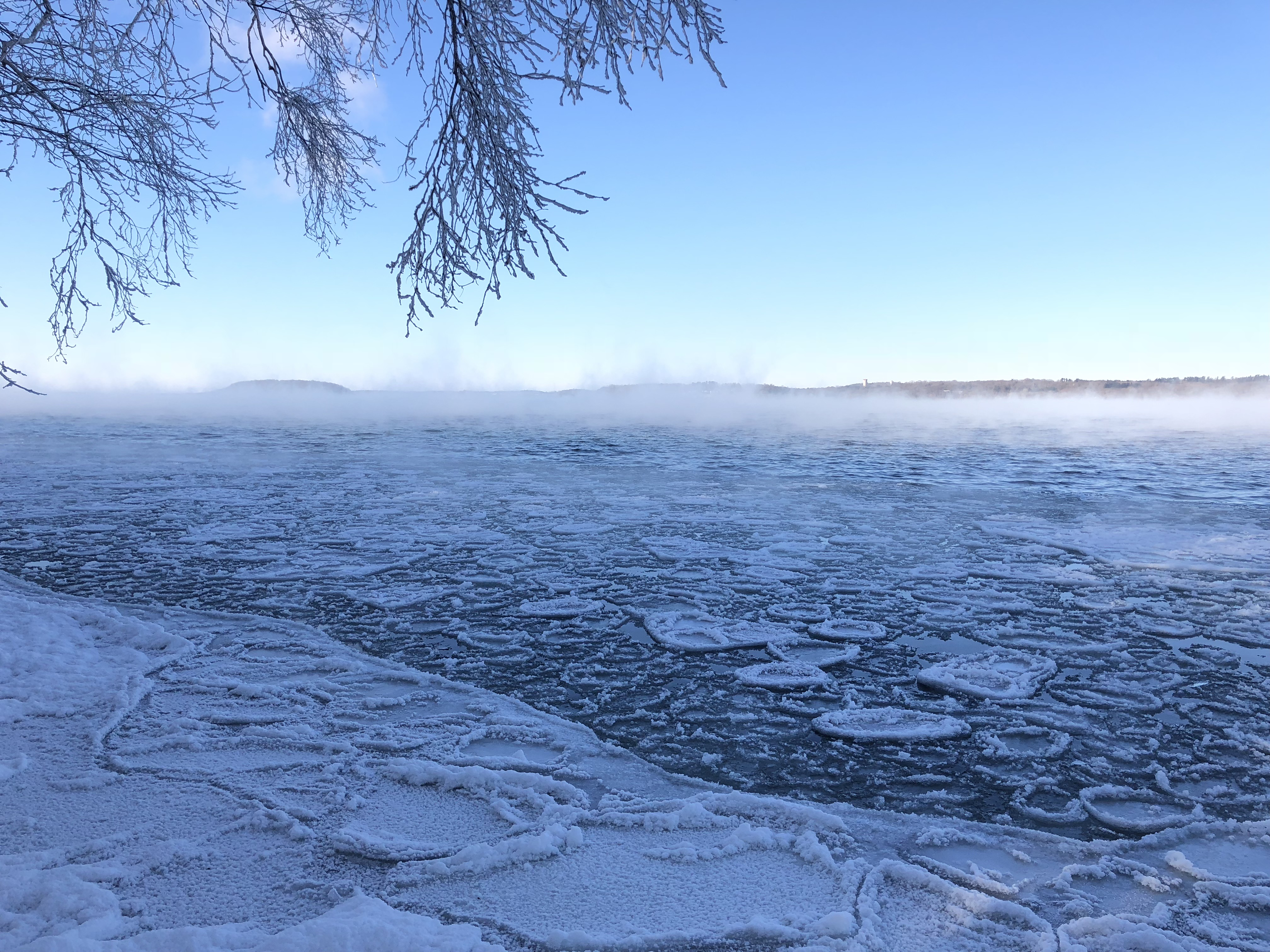
Pancake ice along the south shoreline of Green Lake, taken at Tuleta Hill

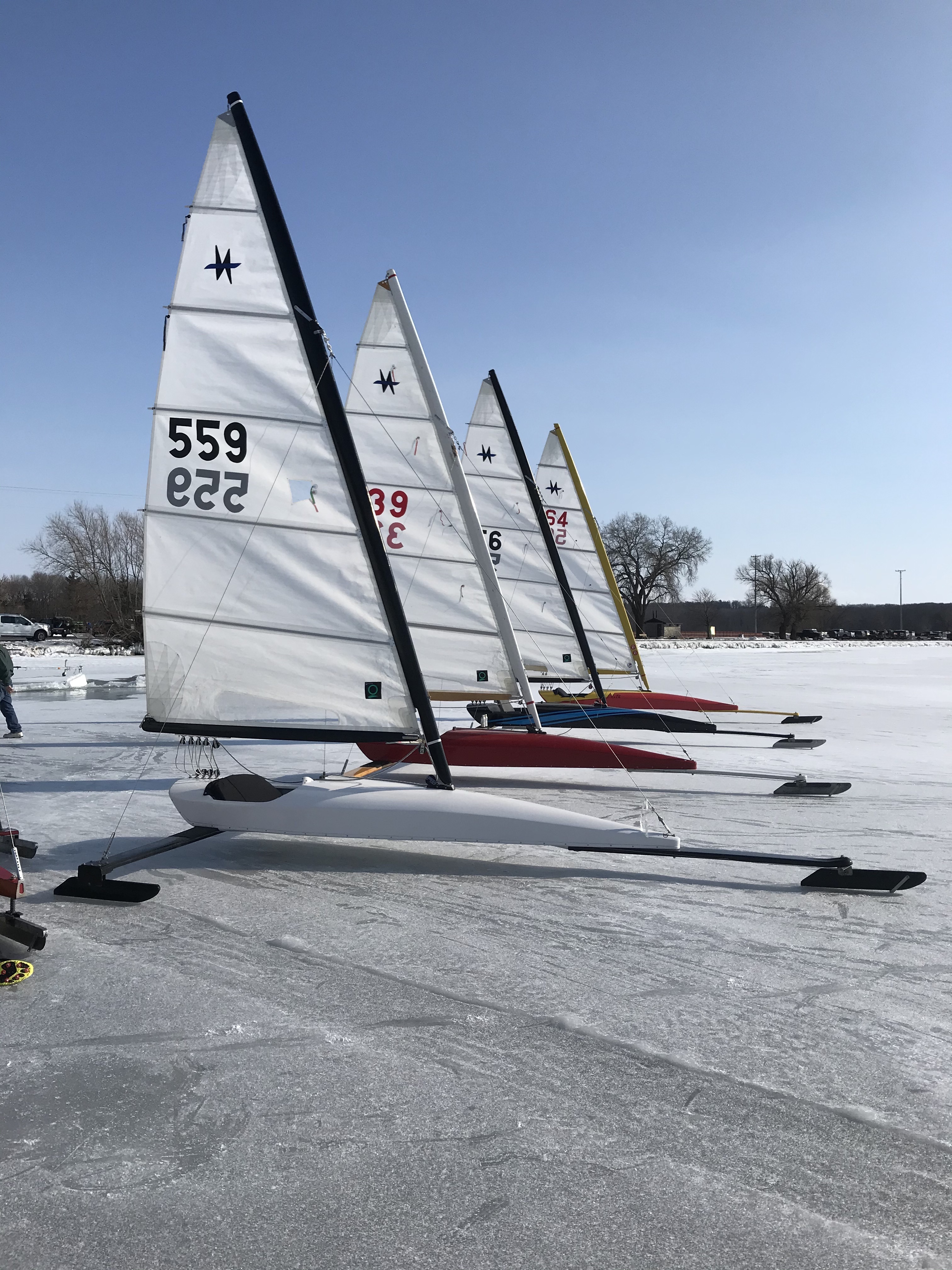
A line of Nite iceboats on Green Lake

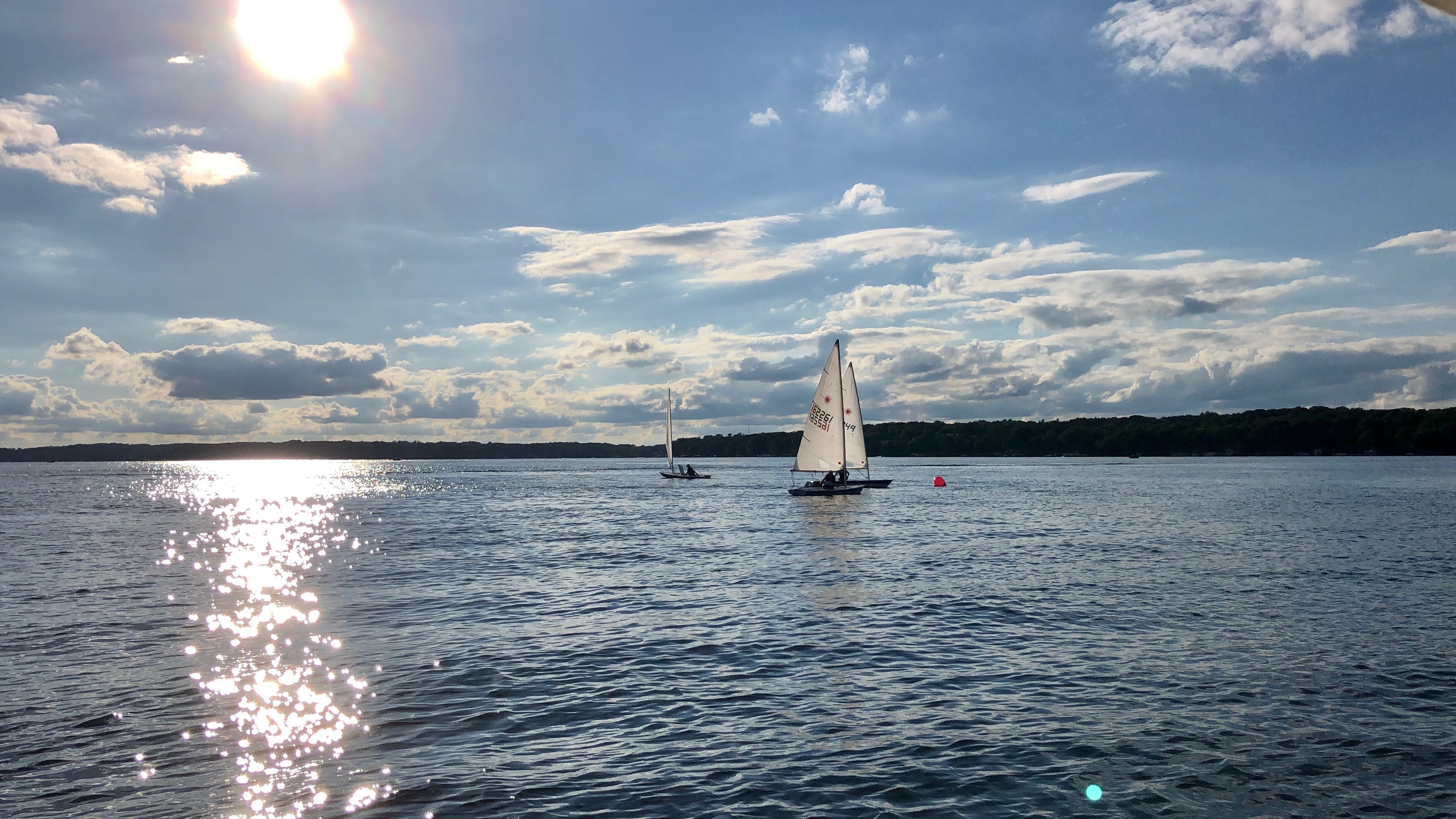
Sailing Lasers on Green Lake

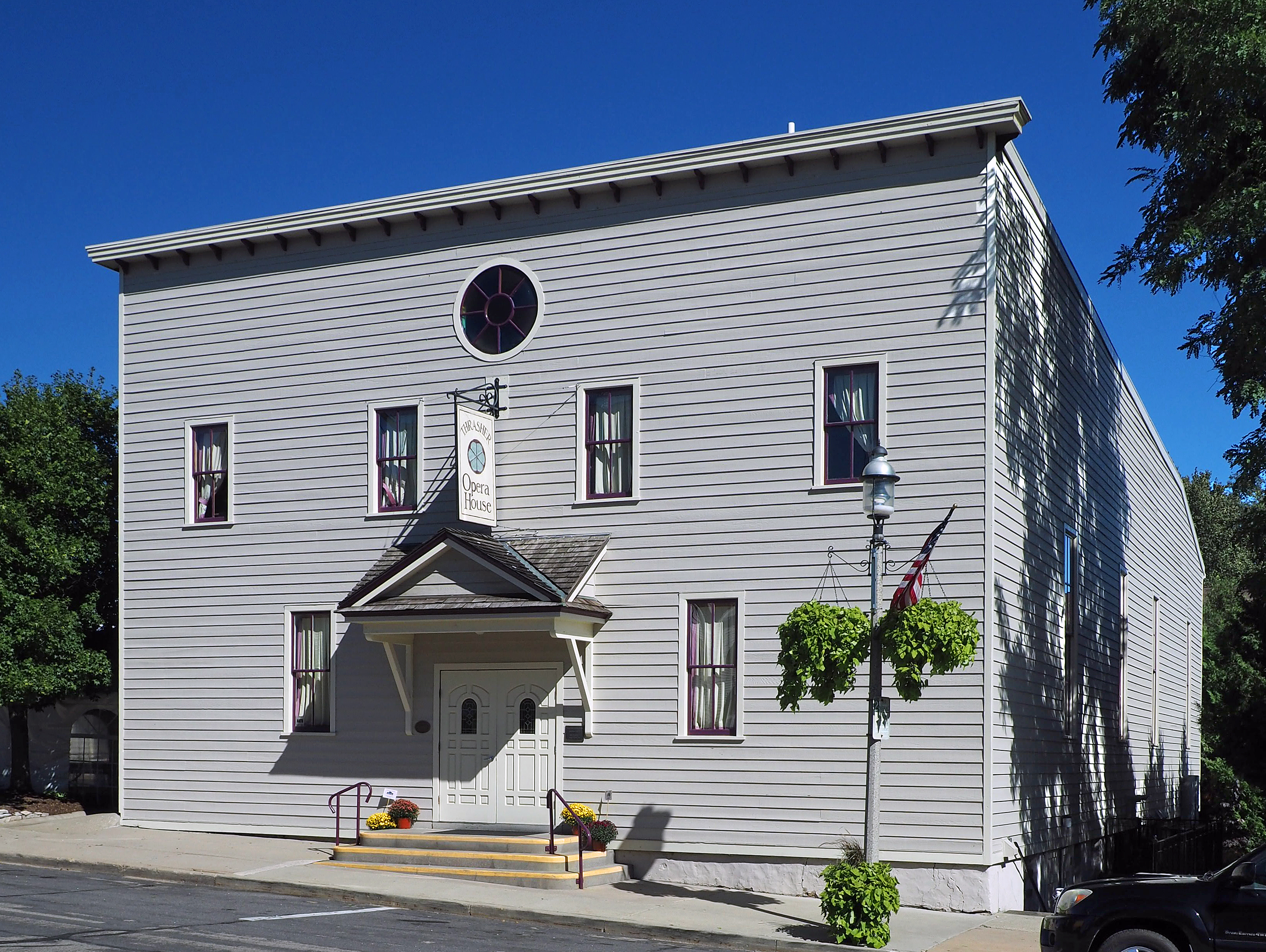

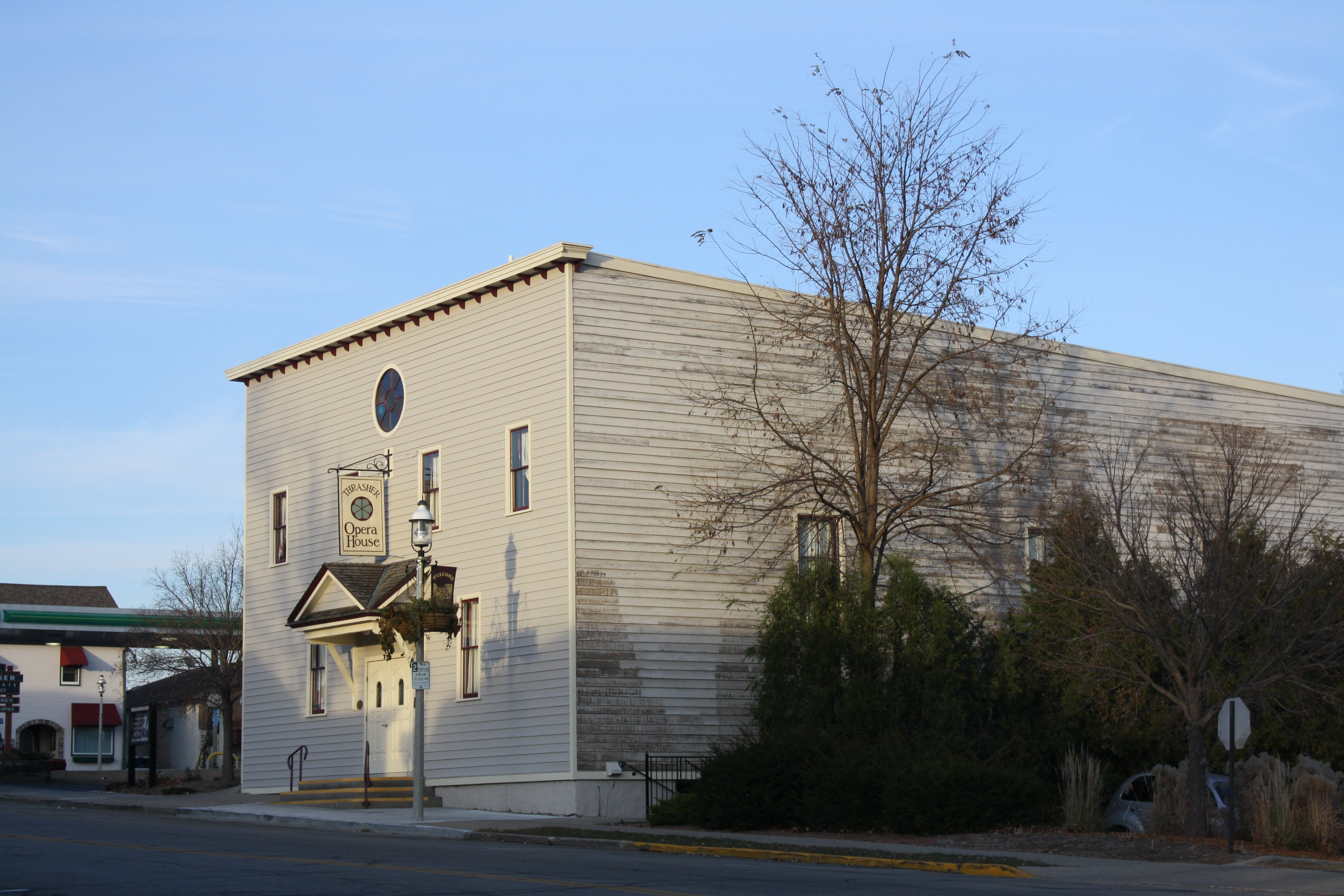
Thrasher's Opera House

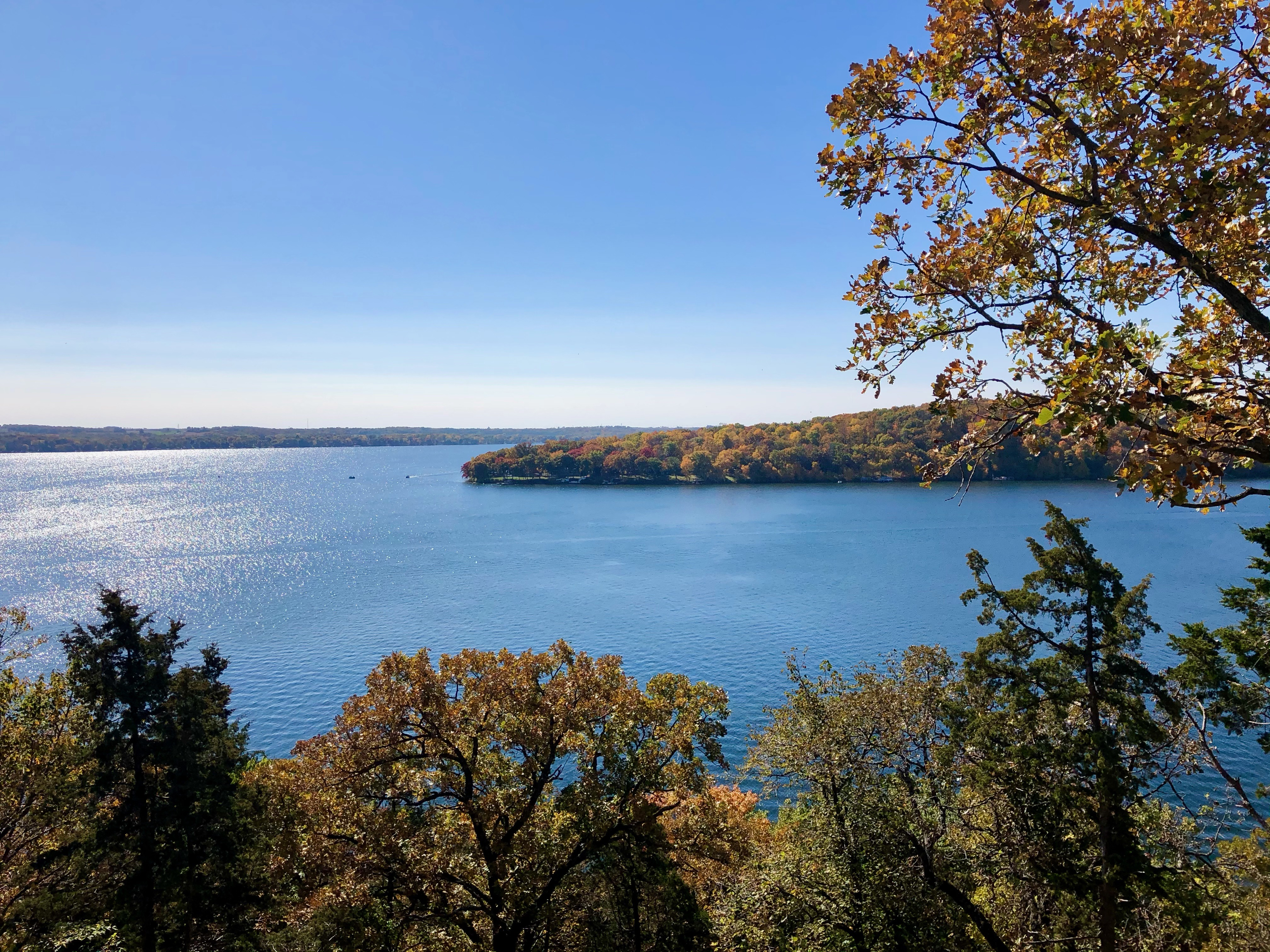
Taken from the Winnebago Trail on the east side of Norwegian Bay
