= Brockway (community), Wisconsin =

Brockway, Wisconsin
- Unincorporated community
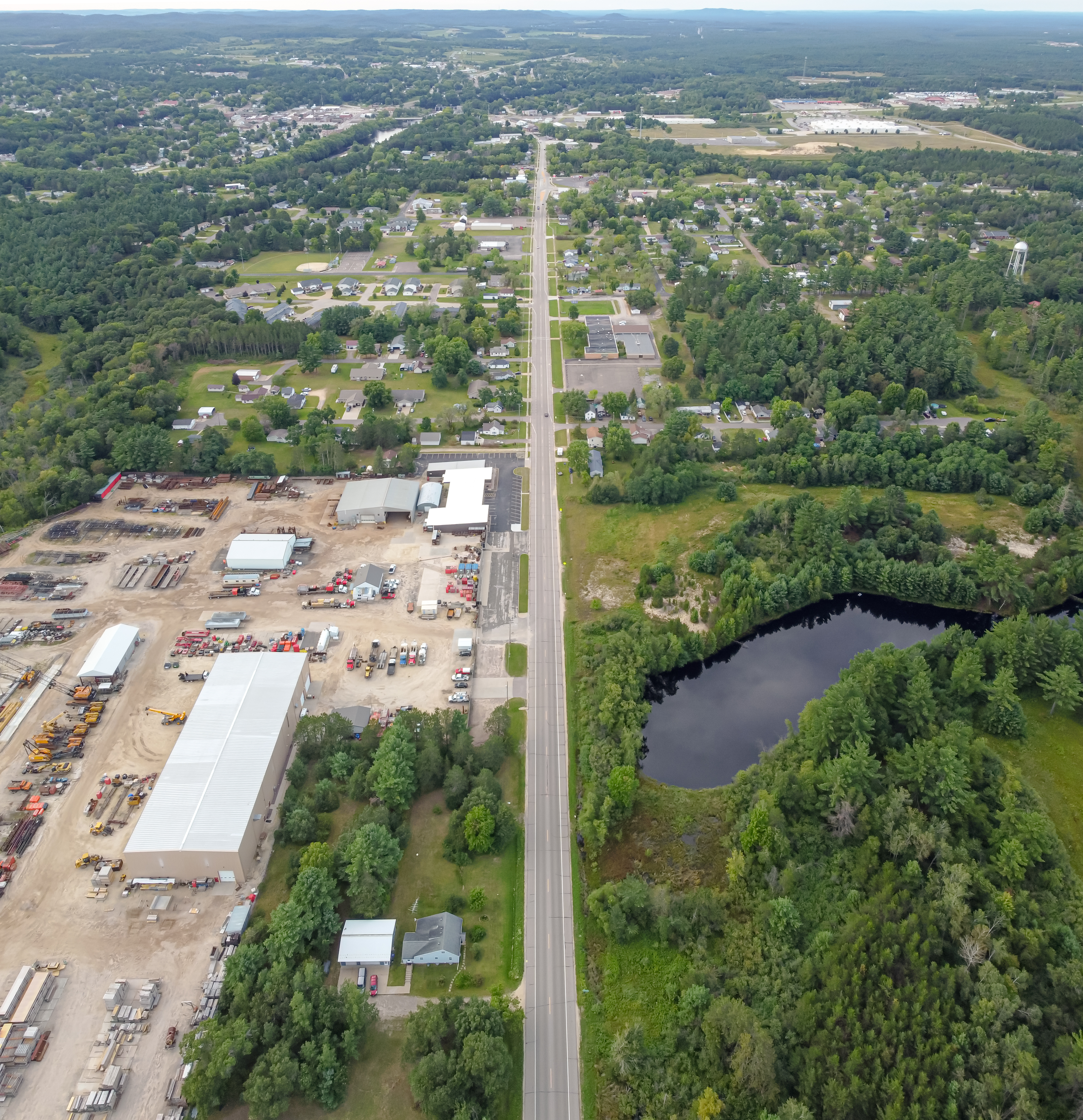
- Looking north up U.S. Route 12

- Location within Wisconsin Location within the United States
- Coordinates: 44°17′05″N 90°50′23″W
- Country: United States
- State: Wisconsin
- County: Jackson
- Town: Brockway
- Elevation: 837 ft (255 m)
- Time zone: UTC-6 (Central (CST))
  - Summer (DST): UTC-5 (CDT)
- Area codes: 715 & 534
- GNIS feature ID: 1845427

Brockway is an unincorporated community located in the town of Brockway, Jackson County, Wisconsin, United States. It is located at the intersection of U.S. Route 12 and Wisconsin Highway 27 and shares its northern border with Black River Falls, Wisconsin.

== History ==
The community was named for Eustace L. Brockway, an area sawmill and steamboat operator who served in the Wisconsin legislature in 1872.

== Images ==
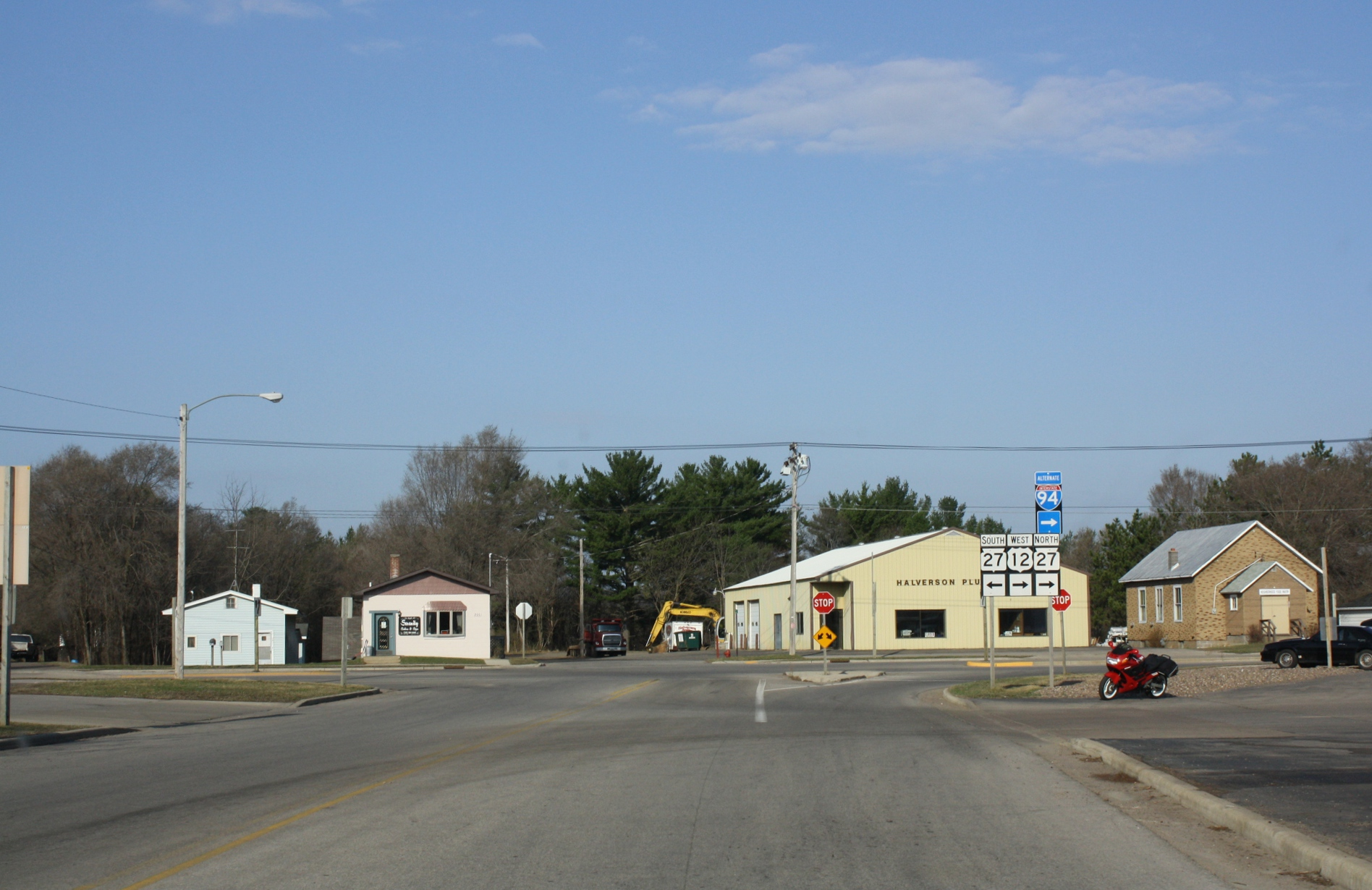
Looking northwest at downtown Brockway on US 12

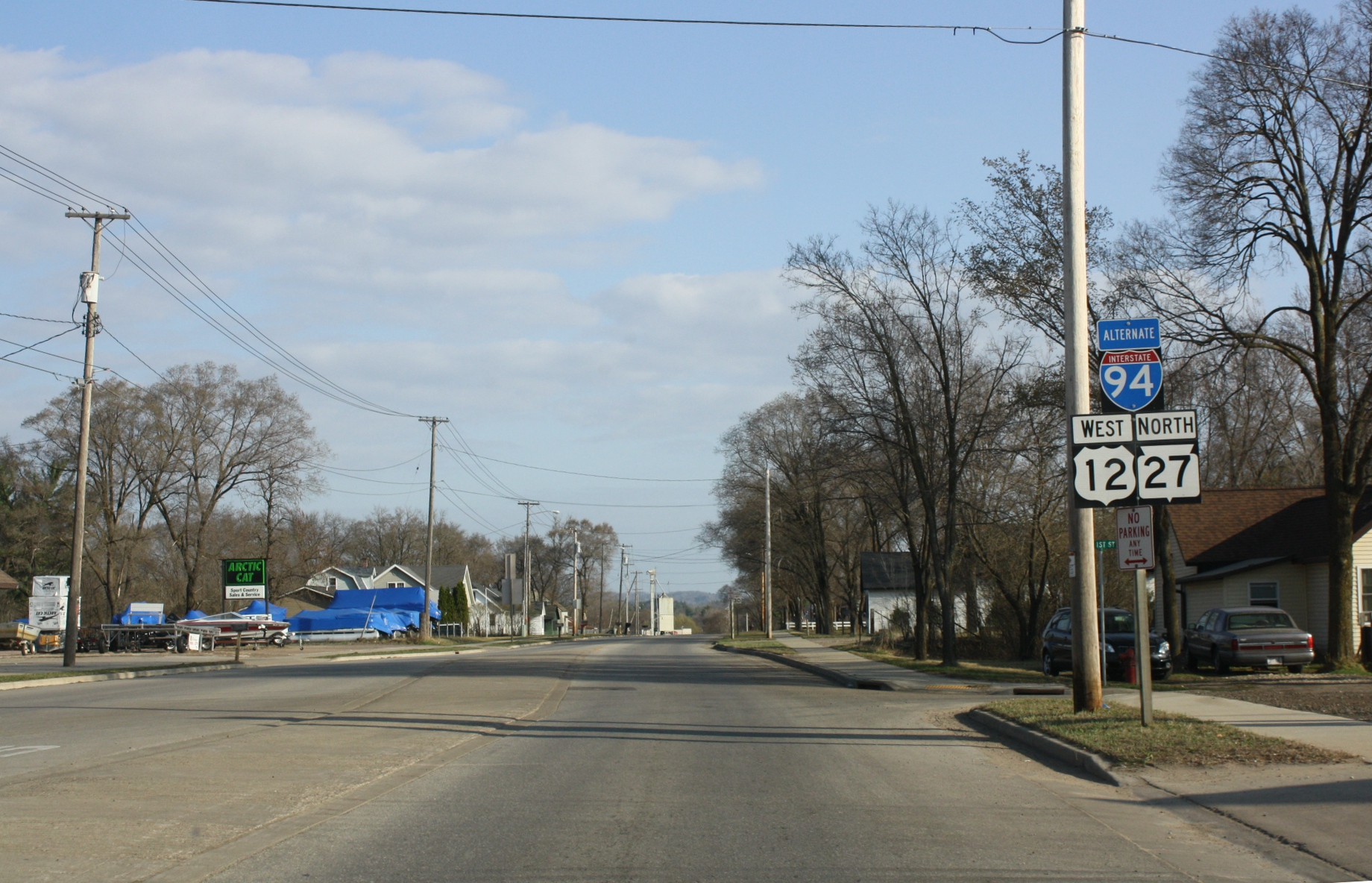
Looking north on US 12 / WIS 27

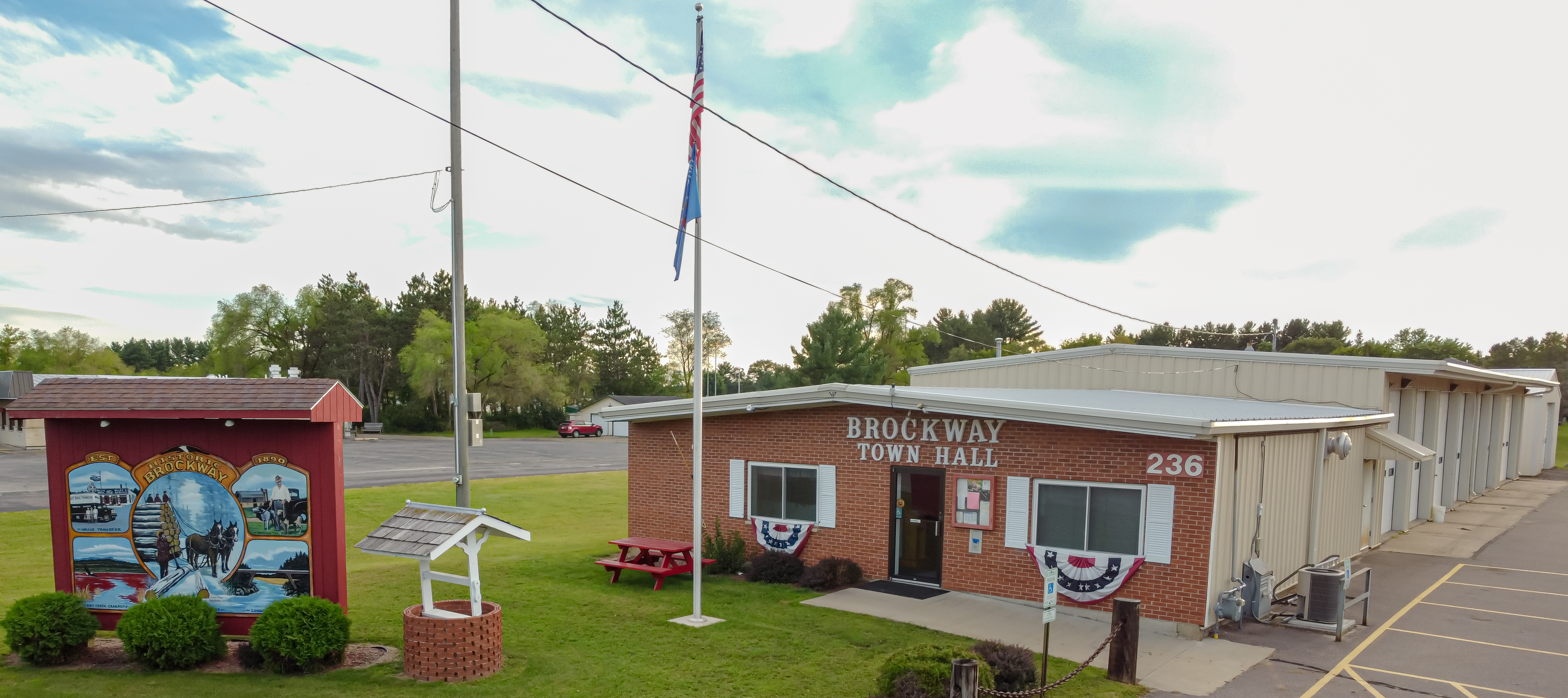
Town hall
