= Thrasher Opera House =

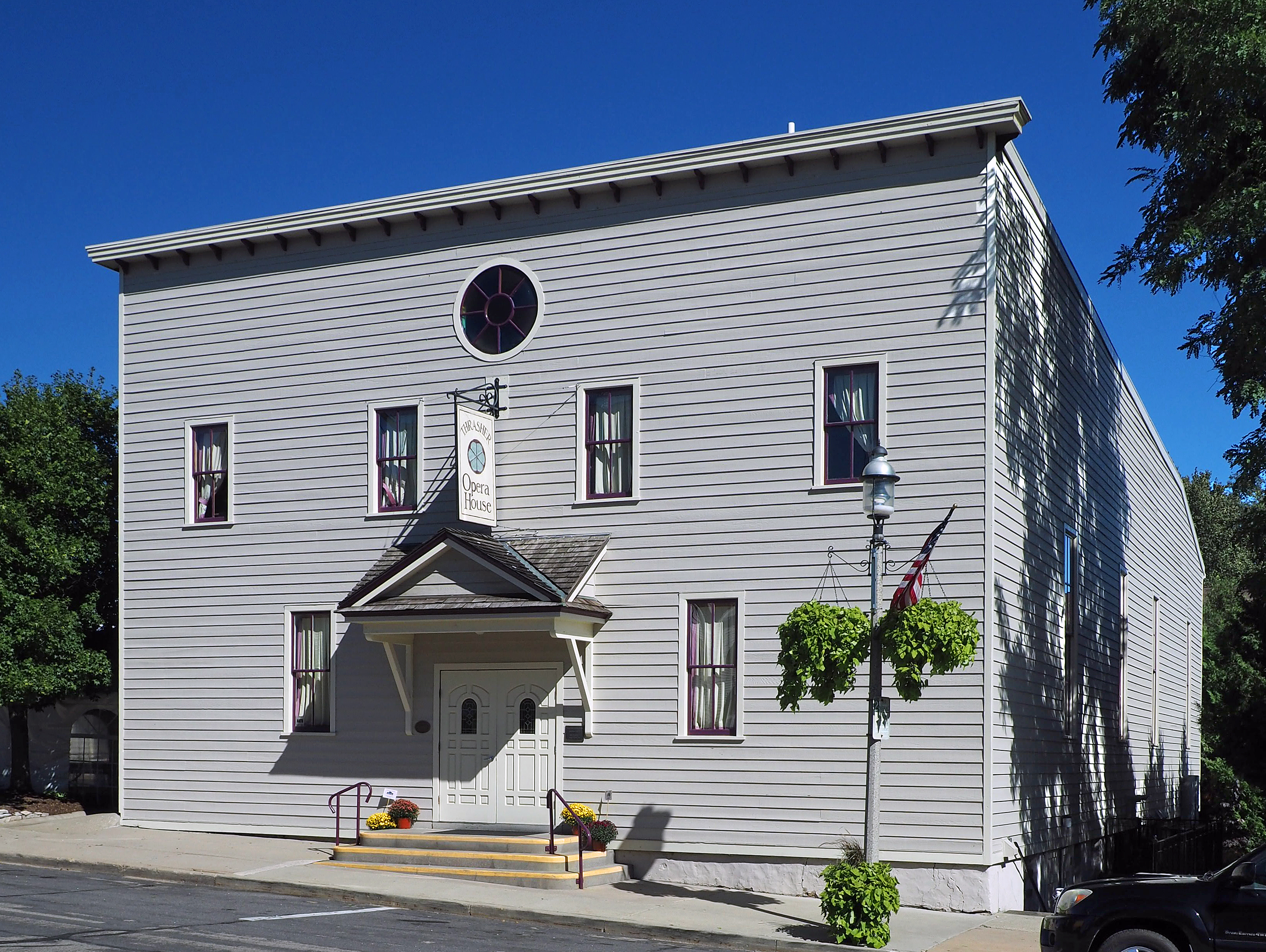
- Interactive map of Thrasher Opera House
- Address: 506 Mill Street; Green Lake, Wisconsin; United States
- Coordinates: 43°50′40.8″N 88°57′36″W
- Owner: Thrasher Opera House Corporation
- Capacity: 200
- Current use: Live event venue

Construction
- Opened: 1910

Website
- www.thrasheroperahouse.com
- Thrasher's Opera House
- U.S. National Register of Historic Places
- NRHP reference No.: 99000921
- Added to NRHP: August 10, 1999

Thrasher Opera House is a historic theater in Green Lake, Wisconsin, United States. It was added to the National Register of Historic Places in 1999.

== History ==
The opera house was built by Charlie Thrasher. It began showing vaudeville and traveling theatrical performance and, later, movies. In the 1920s, the opera house installed the proper equipment to show sound films. The building underwent renovations in the 1990s. It is listed on the Wisconsin State Register of Historic Places and has been designated a City of Green Lake Historic Structure.
