= Sheppard, Wisconsin =

- Unincorporated community
- Location within Wisconsin Location within the United States
- Coordinates: 44°15′39″N 90°46′51″W
- Country: United States
- State: Wisconsin
- County: Jackson
- Town: Brockway
- Elevation: 873 ft (266 m)
- Time zone: UTC-6 (Central (CST))
  - Summer (DST): UTC-5 (CDT)
- Area codes: 715 & 534
- GNIS feature ID: 1574015

Sheppard is an unincorporated community located in the town of Brockway, Jackson County, Wisconsin, United States.

== History ==
The community was named for Andrew Sheppard, the owner of a local sawmill.
