= Sand Pillow, Wisconsin =

Census-designated place in Wisconsin, United States

- Census-designated place
- Location within Wisconsin Location within the United States
- Coordinates: 44°19′58″N 90°45′46″W
- Country: United States
- State: Wisconsin
- County: Jackson
- Town: Brockway

Area
  - Total: 0.23 sq mi (0.60 km^{2})
  - Land: 0.23 sq mi (0.60 km^{2})
  - Water: 0 sq mi (0.0 km^{2})
- Elevation: 879 ft (268 m)

Population (2020)
  - Total: 262
- Time zone: UTC-6 (Central (CST))
  - Summer (DST): UTC-5 (CDT)
- ZIP Code: 54615 (Black River Falls)
- Area codes: 715/534
- FIPS code: 55-71512
- GNIS feature ID: 2813346

Sand Pillow is a census-designated place (CDP) in Jackson County, Wisconsin, United States. As of the 2020 census, it had a population of 262.

The community is in central Jackson County, on land of the Ho-Chunk Nation of Wisconsin. It is bordered to the south by Wisconsin Highway 54, which leads southwest 5 miles (8 km) to Black River Falls, the county seat, and east 48 miles (77 km) to Port Edwards.
