= Green Lake Village Hall =

- U.S. National Register of Historic Places
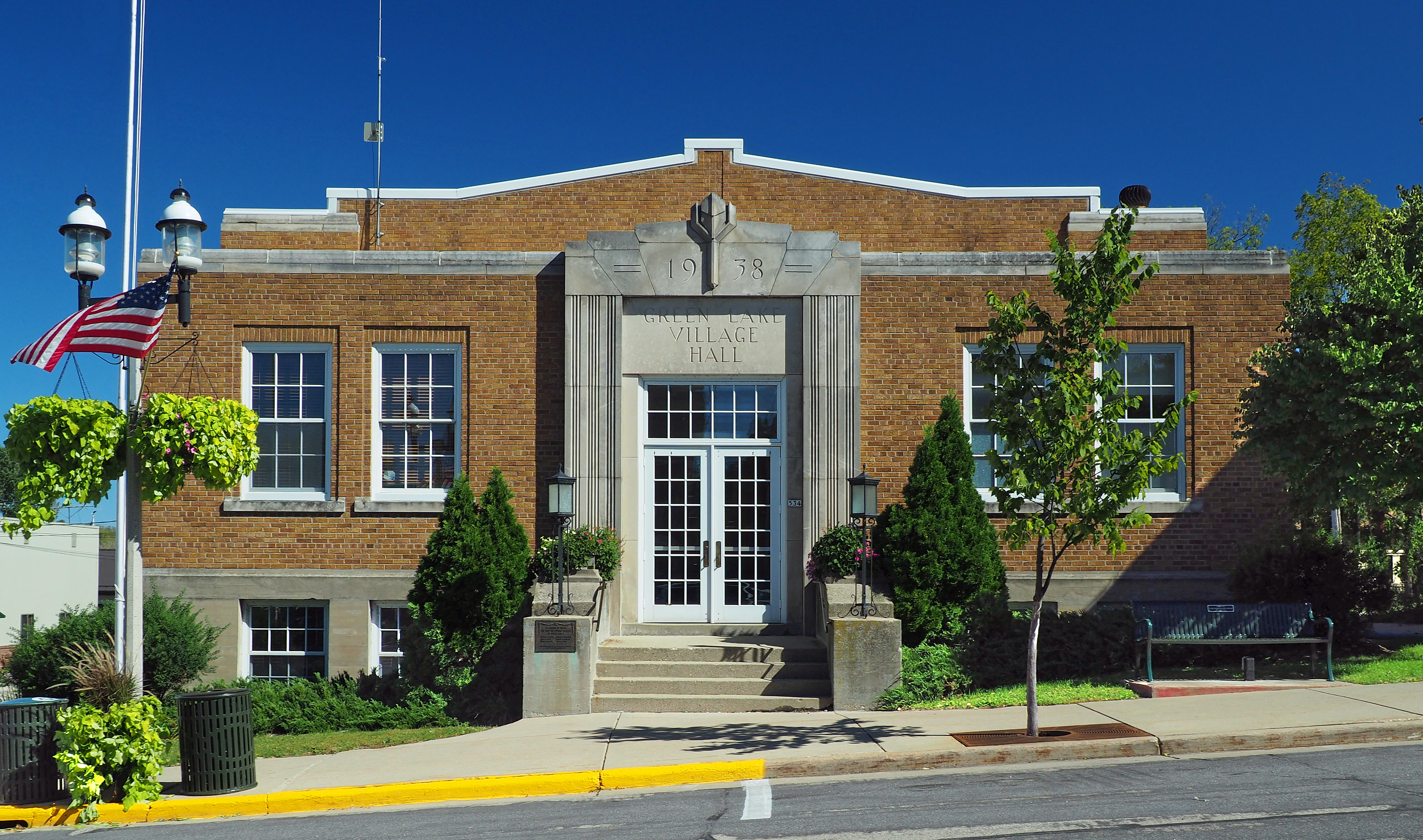
- Green Lake Village Hall from the west
- Location: 534 Mill Street, Green Lake, Wisconsin
- Coordinates: 43°50′45.3″N 88°57′35″W
- Area: less than one acre
- Built: 1939
- Architect: W.C. Weeks, Inc.
- Architectural style: Modern Movement/Art Deco
- NRHP reference No.: 04000997
- Added to NRHP: September 15, 2004

Green Lake Village Hall is located in Green Lake, Wisconsin, United States. It was added to both the State and the National Register of Historic Places in 2004.

== History ==
The building was designed by W. C. Weeks Inc. and completed in 1939 with WPA help. Originally housed a gym and stage on the first floor and city offices, a library and fire departments in the basement. The gym's roof is supported by early laminated wooden arches.
