= L. E. Potter =

American politician

LeForest Edgar Potter
- Born: August 10, 1858; Green Lake, Wisconsin
- Died: May 1, 1942 (aged 83); Near Springfield, Minnesota
- Office: Member of the Minnesota Senate
- Spouse: Ada May Redford (m. 1885)
- Children: Three

LeForest Edgar Potter (August 10, 1858 – May 1, 1942) was a member of the Minnesota Senate.

== Biography ==
Potter was born on August 10, 1858, in Green Lake, Wisconsin. In 1885, he married Ada May Redford. They had three children. He died on May 1, 1942, at his farm near Springfield, Minnesota.

== Career ==
Potter was a member of the Senate from 1915 to 1918, where he served on the Livestock Committee. Additionally, he was a member of the University of Minnesota Board of Regents from 1920 to 1922.
