= Brockway, Wisconsin =

- Town
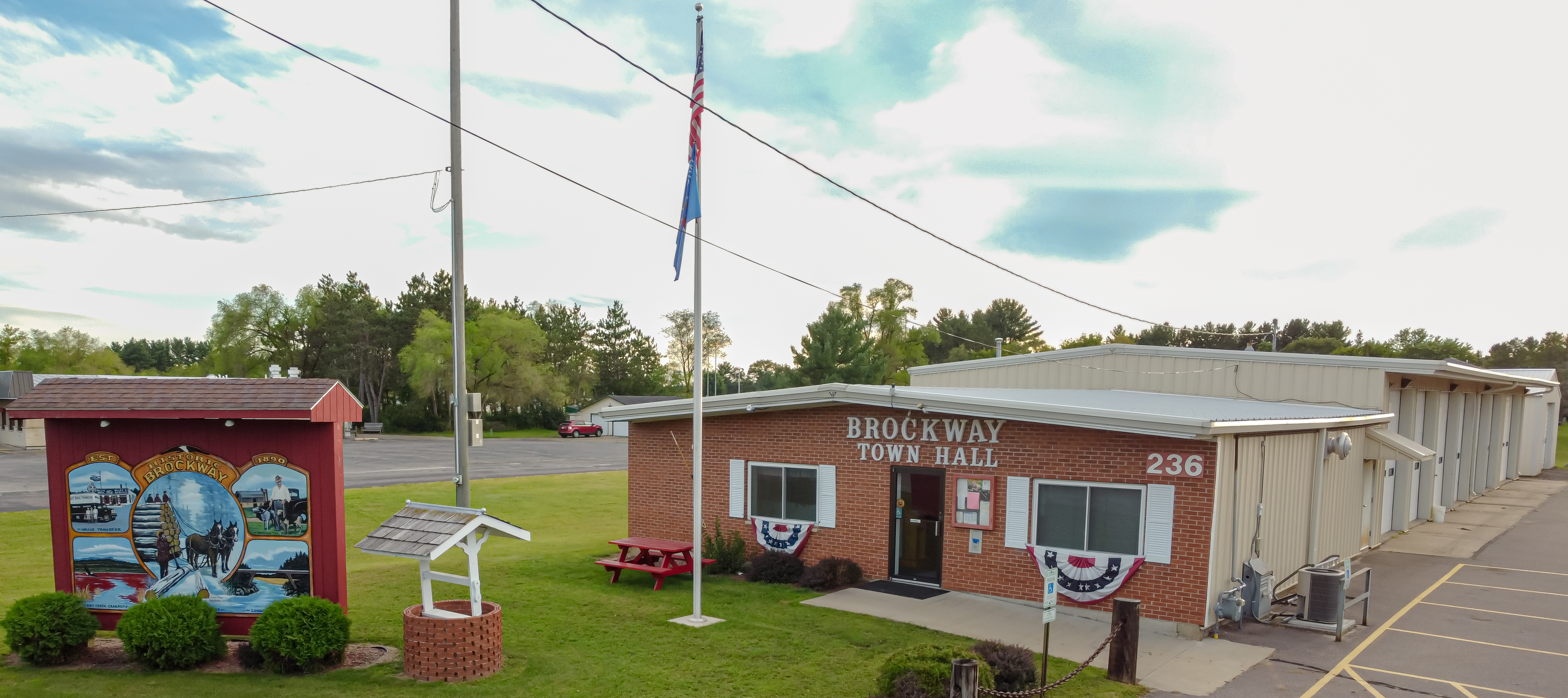
- Town hall

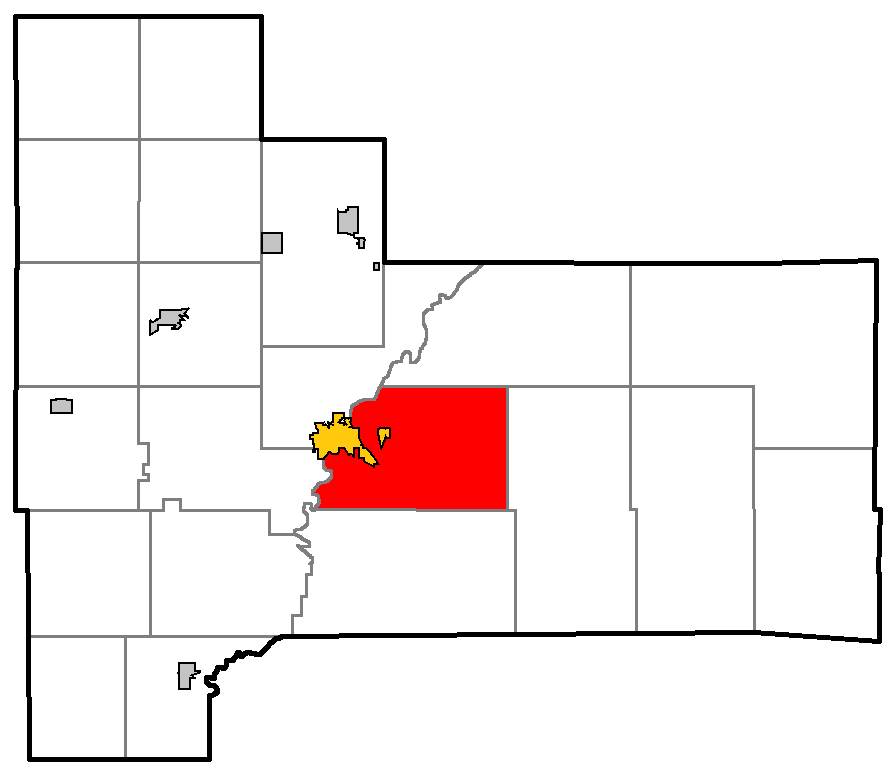
- Location of Brockway, Jackson County

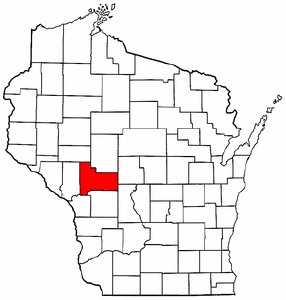
- Location of Jackson County, Wisconsin
- Coordinates: 44°18′1″N 90°47′39″W
- Country: United States
- State: Wisconsin
- County: Jackson

Area
  - Total: 48.5 sq mi (125.5 km^{2})
  - Land: 47.7 sq mi (123.5 km^{2})
  - Water: 0.77 sq mi (2.0 km^{2})
- Elevation: 920 ft (280 m)

Population (2020)
  - Total: 3,035
  - Density: 63.65/sq mi (24.57/km^{2})
- Time zone: UTC-6 (Central (CST))
  - Summer (DST): UTC-5 (CDT)
- FIPS code: 55-09900
- GNIS feature ID: 1582864
- Website: https://townofbrockway.com/

Brockway is a town in Jackson County, Wisconsin, United States. The population was 3,035 at the 2020 census. The unincorporated communities of Brockway, Sand Pillow, Sheppard, and Vaudreuil are located in the town.

== History ==
The Town of Brockway was organized out of a portion of the town of Albion in the early 1890s. It was named for Eustace L. Brockway, an area sawmill and steamboat operator who served in the Wisconsin legislature in 1872.

The town of Komensky was organized from a portion of the town of Brockway in 1913.

== Geography ==
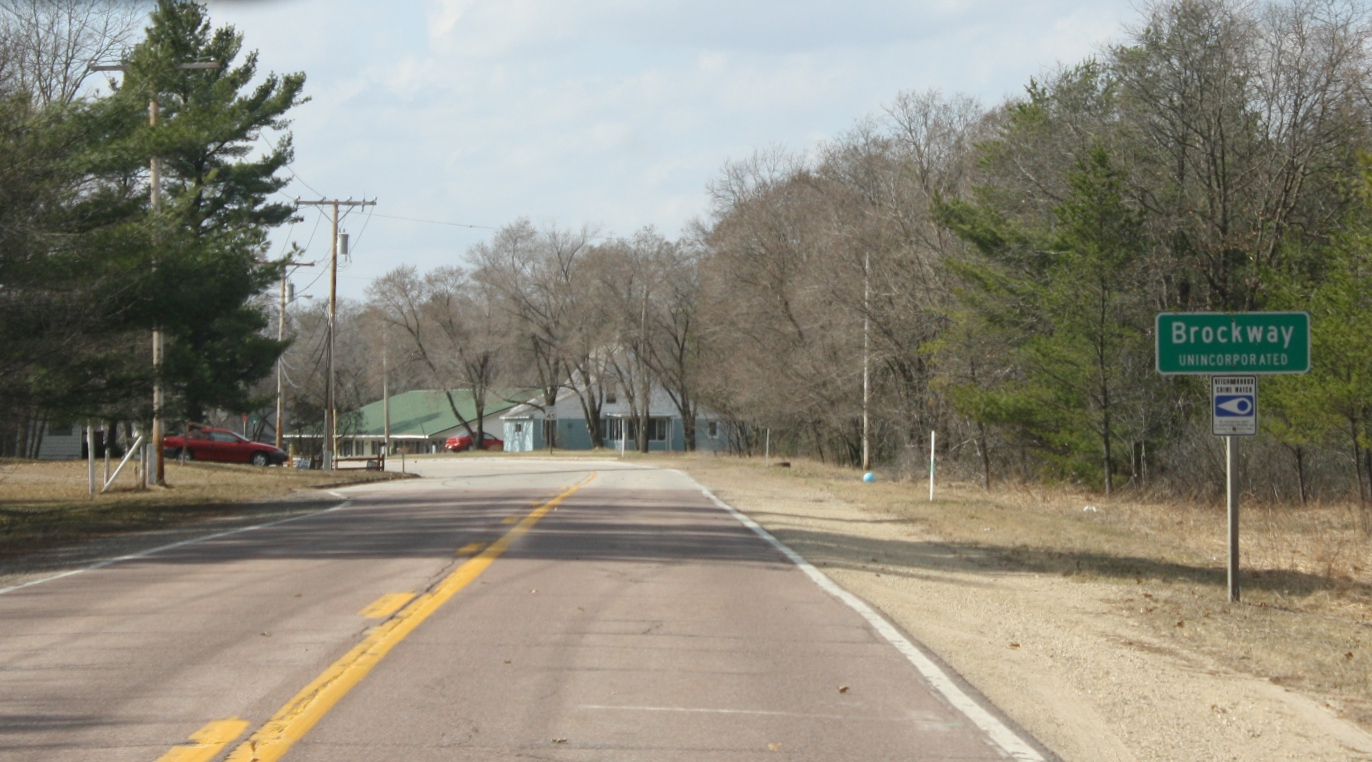
Looking north in the unincorporated community of Brockway

According to the United States Census Bureau, the town has a total area of 48.5 square miles (125.5 km^{2}), of which 47.7 square miles (123.5 km^{2}) is land and 0.8 square mile (2.0 km^{2}) (1.59%) is water.

== Demographics ==
As of the census of 2000, there were 2,580 people, 613 households, and 400 families residing in the town. The population density was 54.1 people per square mile (20.9/km^{2}). There were 687 housing units at an average density of 14.4 per square mile (5.6/km^{2}). The racial makeup of the town was 65.85% White, 14.34% African American, 17.67% Native American, 0.12% Asian, 0.08% Pacific Islander, 0.66% from other races, and 1.28% from two or more races. Hispanic or Latino of any race were 2.87% of the population.

There were 613 households, out of which 35.4% had children under the age of 18 living with them, 44.2% were married couples living together, 15.5% had a female householder with no husband present, and 34.7% were non-families. 27.6% of all households were made up of individuals, and 9.0% had someone living alone who was 65 years of age or older. The average household size was 2.61 and the average family size was 3.19.

In the town, the population was spread out, with 18.7% under the age of 18, 16.2% from 18 to 24, 41.9% from 25 to 44, 16.2% from 45 to 64, and 7.0% who were 65 years of age or older. The median age was 31 years. For every 100 females, there were 210.1 males. For every 100 females age 18 and over, there were 255.4 males.

The median income for a household in the town was $34,519, and the median income for a family was $40,688. Males had a median income of $22,440 versus $19,926 for females. The per capita income for the town was $14,709. About 5.2% of families and 16.9% of the population were below the poverty line, including 9.6% of those under age 18 and 14.6% of those age 65 or over.

== Attractions ==
- Wazee Lake is the deepest lake in Wisconsin.
