= Wazee Lake =

Artificial lake of Wisconsin, US

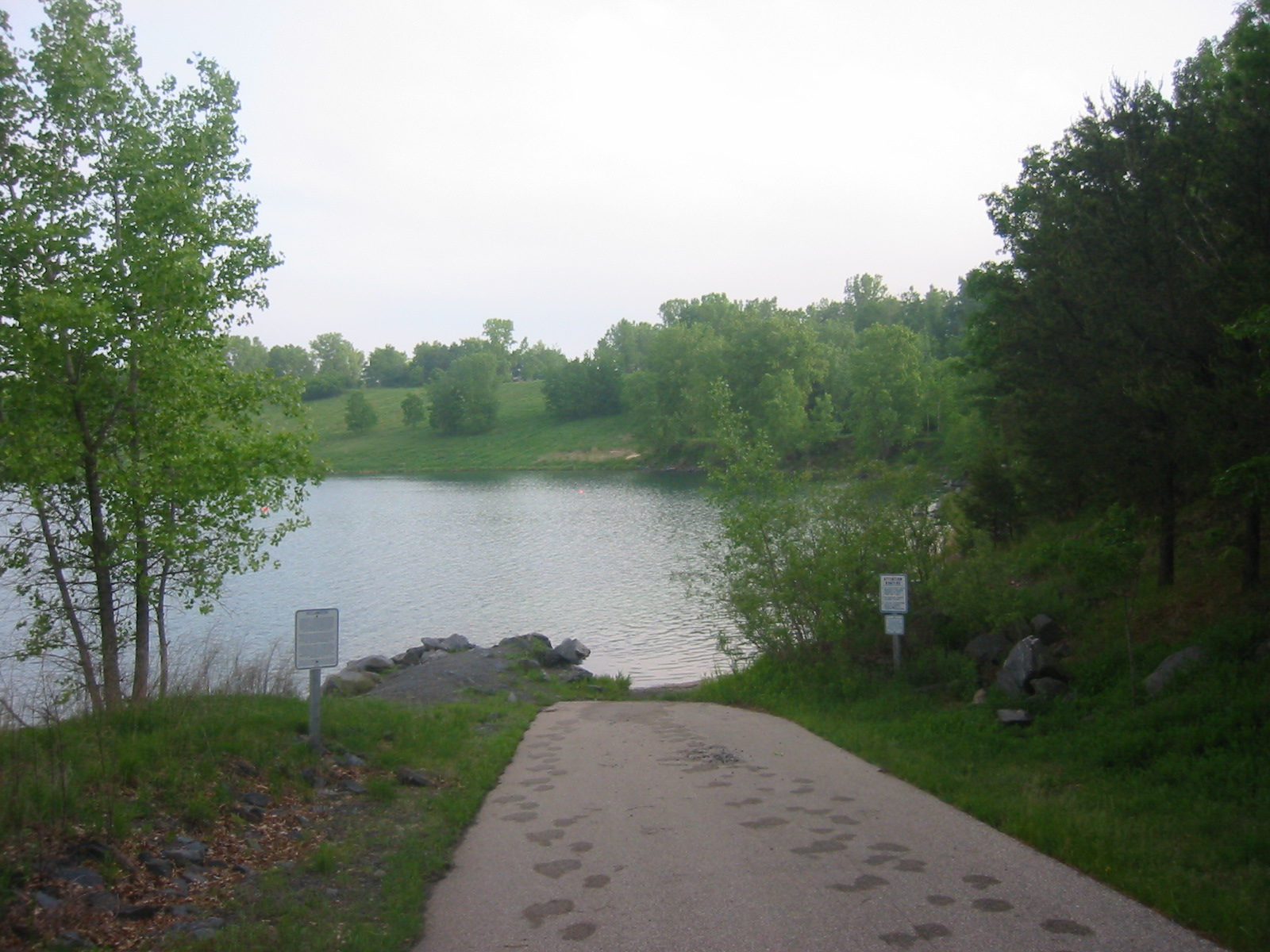
- A ramp leading down to one of the scuba diving accesses at Wazee Lake.

- Location within Wisconsin Location within the United States
- Location: Brockway, Jackson County, east of Black River Falls, Wisconsin
- Coordinates: 44.290°N 90.723°W
- Type: Artificial
- Basin countries: United States
- Max. length: 4,000 ft (1,200 m)
- Max. width: 1,800 ft (550 m)
- Surface area: 146 acres (0.59 km^{2})
- Max. depth: 355 ft (108 m)
- Surface elevation: 900 ft (270 m)

Wazee Lake is a lake east of Black River Falls, Wisconsin, in the town of Brockway, Jackson County, Wisconsin, United States. The name "Wazee" means "tall pine" in the Ho-Chunk language. The artificial lake is the deepest lake within the state of Wisconsin, with a maximum depth of approximately 355 feet (108 m). The man-made lake was formed after the site was used as a quarry for taconite mining between the mid-1960s through April 1983. The quarry produced about 850,000 tons of taconite pellets each year. The mine closed in 1983 as a result of a crash of the domestic steel markets in the United States. When the mine was in operation, pumps removed about 800 US gallons (3,000 L; 670 imp gal) of water per minute from the quarry. Once these pumps were shut down, the quarry began filling with water.

The lake is now part of a county park known as Wazee Lake Recreation Area. The lake is a prime scuba diving destination because of its deep, clear water. Visibility averages between 30 and 40 feet (9.1 and 12.2 m) during the summer months. There are also visible remains of mining operations underwater, such as roadways used for hauling equipment. Some features have been added to the lake, such as underwater platforms for training divers and fish cribs to improve habitat for the fish. Fish species within the lake include rainbow, brook, and brown trout, bluegills, suckers, catfish, walleye, warmouth, and smallmouth bass.

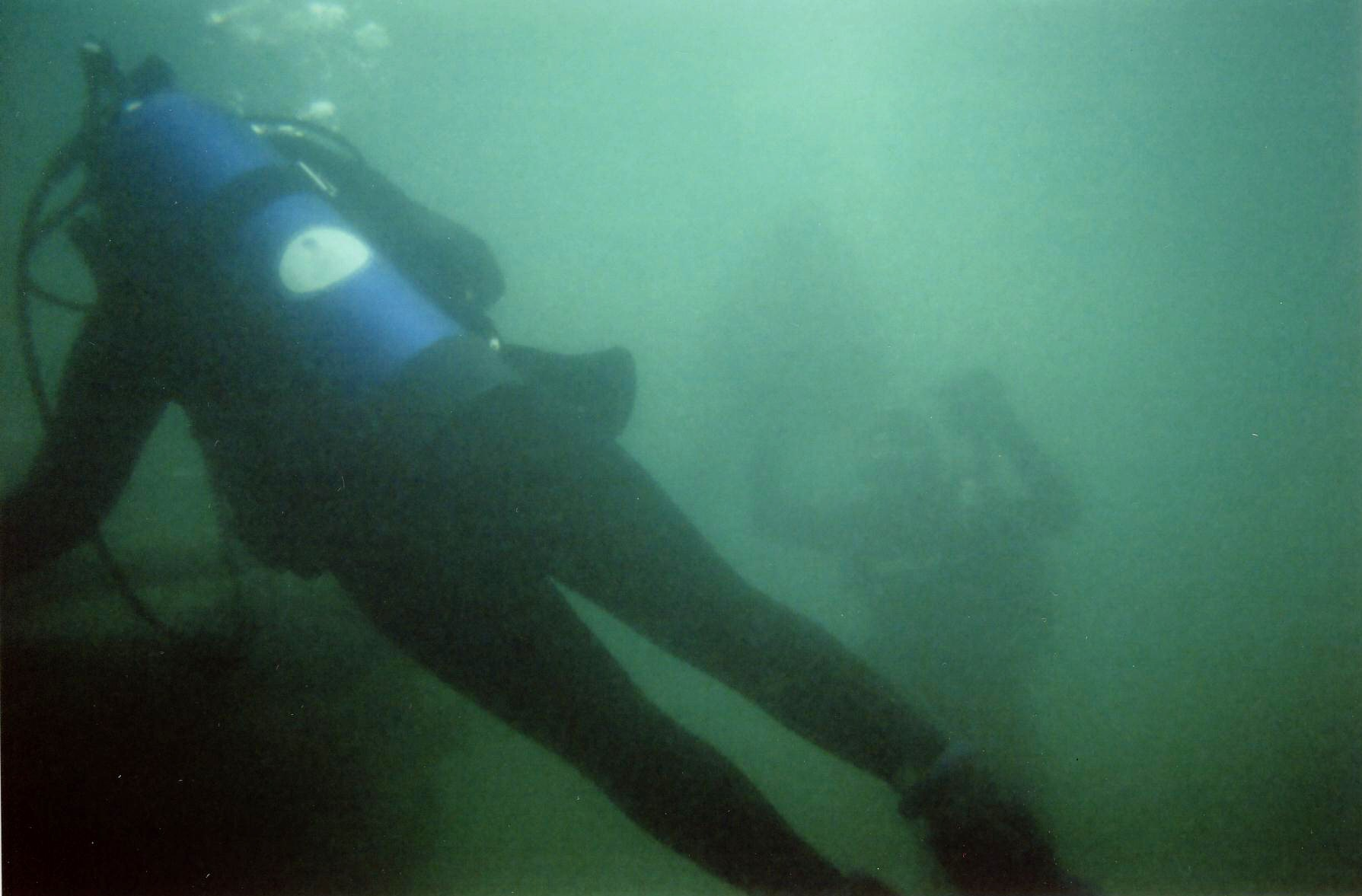
Scuba divers approaching a platform about 20 feet (6.1 m) below the surface of Wazee Lake.

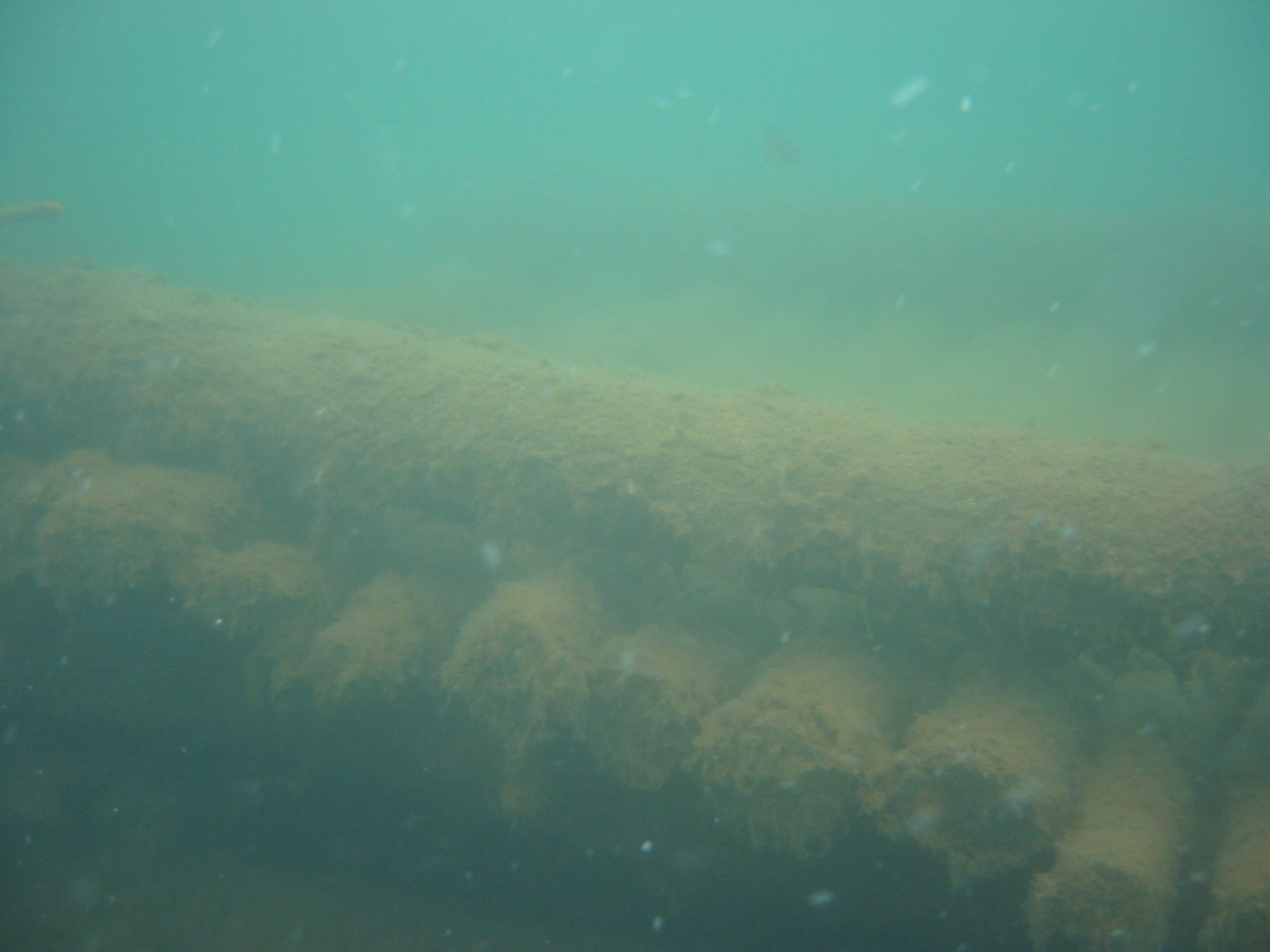
A fish crib, which provides habitat for small fish.
