= Brockway, Oregon =

Unincorporated community in the state of Oregon, United States

- Unincorporated community
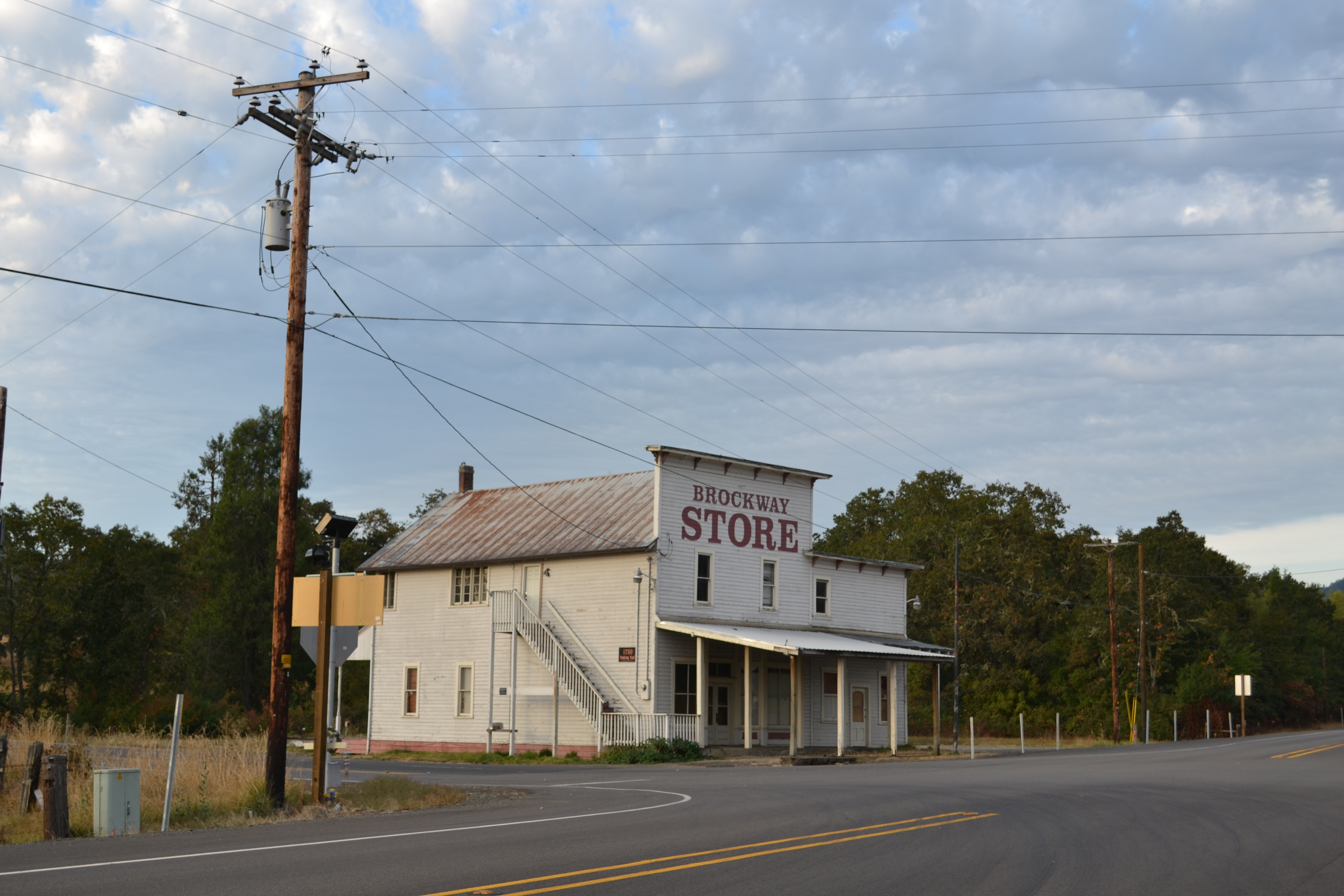
- Store in Brockway

- Location within Oregon Location within the United States
- Coordinates: 43°06′32″N 123°27′19″W
- Country: United States
- State: Oregon
- County: Douglas
- Elevation: 571 ft (174 m)
- Time zone: UTC-8 (Pacific (PST))
  - Summer (DST): UTC-7 (PDT)
- ZIP code: 97496
- GNIS feature ID: 1136094

Brockway is an unincorporated community in Douglas County, Oregon, United States, on Oregon Route 42, approximately nine miles southwest of Roseburg.

Originally known as Civil Bend, referring to the "...boisterous activity of visitors to the horseraces," the name was changed in 1889 when postal authorities objected to a name with two words. "Brockway" was chosen in honor of local farmer and pioneer B. B. Brockway.

== Benjamin Brockway ==
Benjamin Benson Brockway (1829 - 1915) was an Oregon Trail pioneer of 1852 from New York. He began farming in the Lookingglass Valley.

Find a Grave website has no tombstone for Benjamin Benson Brockway.

The website http://oregonpioneers.com/ortrail.htm only has this Brockway entry for 1852 BROCKWAY, Beman Bostwick (12 Feb 1829-03 Mar 1905): m1. 21 Jun 1870 FEATHERS, Margaret Ann; m2. 1883 COCKELREAS, Mary Francis; s/o Horace and Eliza (Morse) Brockway; buried Civil Bend Cemetery, Winston, Douglas County, Oregon Beman Bostwick Brockway was from Ripley, NY
