= Robin Brockway =

British actor

Robin Brockway (born 17 April 1981 in Shrewsbury) is a British actor.

== Career ==
Television appearances include The Bill for ITV, Holby City for the BBC and Dispatches for Channel 4.

Theatre work includes Frankie in A Lie of the Mind, Arthur Kipps in Half a Sixpence and the Scarecrow in The Wizard of Oz.

== Trivia ==
- Great nephew of Fenner Brockway.
