= Eustace L. Brockway =

American politician

Eustace L. Brockway (January 20, 1826 – December 4, 1901) was a member of the Wisconsin State Assembly. The town of Brockway, Wisconsin was named in his honor.

== Biography ==
Brockway was born on January 20, 1826, in Brockwayville, Pennsylvania. On October 18, 1849, he married Sarah Riggs. They had seven children. Brockway was involved in the lumber business. Brockway died on December 4, 1901, in Brockway, Wisconsin. He was buried in Black River Falls, Wisconsin.

Brockway's lineage traces to Myles Standish on his father's side and to William Goffe on his mother's side.

== Career ==
Brockway was a member of the Assembly during the 1872 session. Additionally, he was County Surveyor of Jackson County, Wisconsin. He was a Republican.
