= National Register of Historic Places listings in Green Lake County, Wisconsin =

Location of Green Lake County in Wisconsin

This is a list of the National Register of Historic Places listings in Green Lake County, Wisconsin. It is intended to provide a comprehensive listing of entries in the National Register of Historic Places that are located in Green Lake County, Wisconsin. The locations of National Register properties for which the latitude and longitude coordinates are included below may be seen in a map.

There are 17 properties and districts listed on the National Register in the county.

This National Park Service list is complete through NPS recent listings posted July 24, 2026.

== Current listings ==
	Name on the Register	Image	Date listed	Location	City or town	Description
1	Beckwith House Hotel	Beckwith House Hotel	September 13, 1991 (#91001389)	101 W. Huron St. 43°58′07″N 88°56′48″W	Berlin	3-story brick commercial block with Italianate touches, built 1863-64. The building opened with a pool room and oyster bar in the basement under the hotel, and the Macnish Brothers' drug store in the storefront. Long considered "the finest hotel in Berlin."
2	Nelson F. Beckwith House	Nelson F. Beckwith House	April 6, 1990 (#90000575)	179 E. Huron St. 43°58′07″N 88°56′35″W	Berlin	Italianate house with cupola built in 1858. Beckwith built sawmills in Omro, then moved to Berlin and tried the hotel business. Now a B&B.
3	Berlin High School	Berlin High School	July 18, 2016 (#16000465)	289 E. Huron St. 43°58′08″N 88°56′19″W	Berlin	The core building was designed by Parkinson & Dockendorff of La Crosse in Collegiate Gothic style and completed in 1918. Now an apartment complex.
4	Berlin Post Office	Berlin Post Office	October 24, 2000 (#00001248)	122 S. Pearl St. 43°58′03″N 88°56′51″W	Berlin	Art Moderne-styled post office built in 1936 with help of the PWA, with a mural inside of "Harvesting Cranberries" by Ray Rudell.
5	Green Lake County Courthouse	Green Lake County Courthouse	March 9, 1982 (#82000672)	492 Hill St. 43°50′44″N 88°57′39″W	Green Lake	Neoclassical courthouse with pedimented portico, designed by William Waters and built in 1899.
6	Green Lake Village Hall	Green Lake Village Hall	September 15, 2004 (#04000997)	534 Mill St. 43°50′45″N 88°57′35″W	Green Lake	Art Deco-influenced public building designed by W. C. Weeks Inc. and completed in 1939 with WPA help. Originally housed a gym and stage on the first floor and city offices, a library and fire departments in the basement. The gym's roof is supported by early laminated wooden arches.
7	Hamilton-Brooks Site		December 19, 1978 (#78000098)	South of Berlin	Berlin	Prehistoric archeological site where Mississippian pottery and a wall foundation have been found.
8	Huron Street Historic District	Huron Street Historic District	August 31, 1992 (#92001140)	Roughly, Huron St. from Fox R. to 124 E. Huron, including adjacent side streets 43°58′07″N 88°56′51″W	Berlin	Berlin's commercial downtown, reconstructed with brick after the fires of the 1860s and 1870. Notable buildings include the 1864 Beckwith House Hotel, the 1889 Romanesque Revival Masonic Temple, the 1890 Kitowski Tailor Shop, the 1893 Styer cigar factory/store, the 1895 Queen Anne Engelbracht Block, the 1897 Classical Revival First National Bank, the 1912 Classical Revival Nigbor Block, and the 1928 Art Deco City Hall.
9	Daniel and Catherine Ketchum Cobblestone House	Daniel and Catherine Ketchum Cobblestone House	April 19, 2001 (#01000397)	147 E. Second St. 43°44′53″N 89°08′23″W	Marquette	3-story Greek Revival-styled home built in 1852 with cobblestone walls and the front framed by four 3-story Doric columns. Clubhouse of the Caw-Caw duck-hunting club in the 1920s and 30s.
10	J. P. Luther Company Glove Factory	J. P. Luther Company Glove Factory	March 21, 1997 (#97000267)	139 S. Pearl St. 43°58′04″N 88°56′53″W	Berlin	2-story brick factory built in 1904, where leather gloves were made, initially by hand. First floor housed offices, cutting, and shipping; second floor housed sewing and finishing. Vacant lot as of November 7, 2010.
11	McClelland-Kasuboski House	McClelland-Kasuboski House	July 15, 1998 (#98000878)	W404 W. Hillside Rd. 43°54′52″N 88°54′07″W	Berlin	Brick Italianate farmhouse built in 1868 by Thomas McClelland, and never finished. McClelland, an Irish immigrant, farmed wheat, dairy and sheep. Sold to the Kasuboskis in 1903.
12	Methodist Episcopal Church	Methodist Episcopal Church	February 5, 2021 (#100006107)	240 West 2nd St. 43°44′49″N 89°08′32″W	Marquette	Small wooden church built in the 1860s by Methodist Episcopal storekeeper J.C. Pierce, with Greek Revival-influenced roof pitch and frieze board, round-topped windows, and a square tower, all clad in clapboard on a fieldstone foundation.
13	Nathan Strong Park Historic District	Nathan Strong Park Historic District	May 10, 2005 (#05000423)	Roughly bounded by N. Wisconsin, E. Moore, N. Swetting and E. Huron Sts. 43°58′10″N 88°56′36″W	Berlin	Residential neighborhood surrounding a city park named for Berlin's founder, with houses in a variety of styles including the 1849 Gothic Revival Ayers house, the 1854 Greek Revival Ward house, the 1858 Italianate Benham house, the 1881 Second Empire Rounds house, the 1881 Queen Anne Williams house, the 1898 Stick/Gothic style Union Church, the 1911 Neoclassical Hitchcock house, the 1911 Talbot bungalow, the 1915 Craftsman Safford house, the 1930 Tudor Revival Kreuter House, and the 1940 French Provincial Voeltner House.
14	Princeton Downtown Historic District	Princeton Downtown Historic District	March 21, 1997 (#97000271)	approximately .33 miles E from Jct. WI 23 and WI 73; 43°51′00″N 89°07′52″W	Princeton	The old business district, including the 1859 Italianate Teske dry goods store, the 1860/1884 Worm saloon, the pre-1885 frame Italianate Henning meat market, the 1882 Italianate Schall building, the 1890 Italianate Luedtke store, the 1891 Rimpler dry goods store, the 1894 Richardsonian Romanesque Princeton State Bank, the 1901 Schade saloon and jewelry store, and the 1901 Commercial Vernacular Yahr building, which initially showcased furniture and caskets.
15	Thrasher's Opera House	Thrasher's Opera House	August 10, 1999 (#99000921)	506 Mill St. 43°50′41″N 88°57′36″W	Green Lake	Multi-purpose small-town theater built in 1909 by D.W. Taylor for Charles Thrasher. It hosted vaudeville troupes, motion pictures, basketball games, dances, school plays, graduations, and other social functions until 1945. Then used for manufacturing and storage until restored as a theater beginning in 1996.
16	Upper Lone Tree Farm Historic District		July 16, 2026 (#100013224)	W2511 State Highway 23, W2600-block Abbey Drive, N5600-block Lawson Drive; 43°50′13″N 89°00′48″W	Brooklyn	Model farm developed primarily from 1913 to 1916 by Jessie and Victor Lawson, publisher of the Chicago Daily News and co-founder of Associated Press, as part of their estate. Surviving buildings include the 1916 Guernsey Barn designed by William Merigold using barn-design ideas from the UW's Ag Experimental Station like the gambrel roof and ventilators, and a "house"-type filling station built in 1954. The Guernsey barn is now owned by a golf course and other parts by American Baptist Assembly.
17	Wisconsin Power and Light Berlin Power Plant		March 19, 1992 (#92000157)	143 Water St. 43°58′10″N 88°57′03″W	Berlin	Small local power plant on the bank of the Fox River, built of brick in 1925 with some 20th Century Commercial stylings.

== See also ==
- List of National Historic Landmarks in Wisconsin
- National Register of Historic Places listings in Wisconsin
- Listings in neighboring counties: Columbia, Dodge, Fond du Lac, Marquette, Waushara, Winnebago
