= Catherine Jones =

Catherine Jones, Katie or Kate Jones may refer to:

- Lady Catherine Jones (1672–1740), patron of arts
- Cathy Jones (born 1955), Canadian writer
- Catherine Jones (novelist) (born 1956), British novelist
- Catherine Jones (journalist) (born 1971), English journalist
- Katie Jones (cricketer) (born 2005), English cricketer
- Katie Jones (politician) (born 1988), American politician
- Kate Jones (scientist) (born 1972), British biodiversity scientist
- Kate L. Jones, British-American nuclear physicist
- Katie Jones (web entrepreneur) (born 1971), English web personality
- Katie Rowley Jones (born c. 1978), British musical theatre actress
- Kate Jones (politician) (born 1979), Australian politician
- Kate Jones (comedian), American comedian
- Catherine Ann Jones, playwright, screenwriter, and author
- Catharine Jones (fl. 1810s–1820s), second wife of DeWitt Clinton, and First Lady of New York

== See also ==
- Catherine Zeta-Jones (born 1969), Welsh actress
- Katherine Jones (disambiguation)
- Jeffrey Catherine Jones (1944–2011), American artist
