= Berlin High School =

Berlin High School is or was the name of several high schools:

== Canada ==
- Kitchener–Waterloo Collegiate and Vocational School, which was previously known as the Berlin High School

== United States ==
- Berlin High School (Connecticut)
- Berlin High School (New Hampshire)
- Berlin High School (Wisconsin)
- Old Berlin High School, former high school in Wisconsin, listed on the National Register of Historic Places
