= List of alumni of the London College of Communication =

This is a list of notable former students of London College of Communication (a constituent college of the University of the Arts London), formerly known as the London College of Printing and, briefly, as the London College of Printing and Distributive Trades.

- Paul Anderson, journalist and author
- Harry Beck, graphic designer and former tutor
- Brian Behan, writer, lecturer
- Jack Bevan, drummer
- Peter Bialobrzeski, photographer
- Marcus Bleasdale, photojournalist
- Helen Boaden, head of BBC News
- Bimini Bon-Boulash, drag queen, actor, musician, model, activist, and LGBTQ icon
- Stephen Bourne, writer, film and social historian
- Tracy Brabin, Member of Parliament for Batley and Spen
- Neville Brody, graphic designer
- Rebekah Brooks (née Wade), former chief executive of News International
- Martin Brunt, journalist
- Michael C. Burgess, actor, poet, activist, former editor at The Star-News
- Garry Bushell, journalist and television presenter
- Juno Calypso, photographer
- John Cantlie, journalist captured by ISIS
- John Cryer, Member of Parliament
- Molly Dineen, documentary filmmaker
- Craig Doyle, BBC and RTÉ presenter
- Jacob Dudman, actor, writer, and filmmaker
- Laurence Dunmore, graphic designer and film director
- Richard Eckersley, book designer
- Lola Flash, photographer
- Juliette Foster, journalist
- Arthur Fraser, former director of the South African State Security Agency
- Anthony Froshaug, typographer
- Rose Glass, film director and screenwriter
- Jefferson Hack, magazine publisher
- Tom Harvey, film producer, playwright
- Charlotte Hawkins, news presenter
- Anthony Hayward, journalist and author
- Emma Healey, novelist, Costa Book Award recipient
- Dan Holdsworth, artist and photographer
- Henry Holland, fashion designer
- Mark Johnson, horse-racing announcer
- Kwame Kwei-Armah, playwright
- Alex Levac, photojournalist and winner of the Israel Prize
- Rut Blees Luxemburg, photographer
- John Lloyd, graphic designer
- Anthony Dod Mantle, cinematographer
- Clive Martin, former Lord Mayor of London
- Althea McNish. textile designer
- Louise Minchin, journalist and news presenter
- Neil Montier, photographer
- Maryam Moshiri, BBC News presenter
- Gemma Morris, journalist and television presenter
- Olive Morris, activist
- Roman Osin, cinematographer and photographer
- Rankin, photographer
- Sukumar Ray, writer
- Tony Ray-Jones, photographer
- Steve Richards, journalist and broadcaster
- Sophy Rickett, photographer, visual artist
- Jane Root, former controller of BBC Two
- Charles Saatchi, advertising executive
- Omid Scobie, journalist and writer
- Jake Scott, film director
- Lee Scott, politician
- Ralph Steadman, political cartoonist, satirist, illustrator
- Thilanga Sumathipala, Sri Lankan politician and cricket administrator
- Kate Thornton, television presenter
- Colin Vaines, film producer
- Vegyn, musician
- James Waterhouse, journalist and former professional rugby union player
- Bonnie Wright, actress
