= Davies-Jones =

Davies-Jones, a Welsh double-barrelled name, may refer to:

- Alex Davies-Jones, British Member of Parliament elected 2019
- Emma Davies Jones (born 1978), British cyclist
- Sir Evan Davies Jones, 1st Baronet (1859–1949), Welsh civil engineer
- Katherine Davies Jones (1860–1943), American botanist
- Robert Davies-Jones, British scientist

== See also ==
- Davies (surname)
- Jones (surname)
