= 5 News =

British news programme

- Titlecard used from 2026.
- Also known as: 5 News with Dan Walker
- Presented by: Dan Walker
- Country of origin: United Kingdom
- Original language: English

Production
- Camera setup: Multi-camera
- Running time: 60 minutes
- Production companies: ITN (1997–2004, 2012–); Sky News (2005–12)

Original release
- Network: 5
- Release: 31 March 1997 – present

Related
- Access; OK! TV

5 News is a British television news programme broadcast on 5 and produced by ITN. It has been broadcasting since Channel 5 launched in March 1997.

== History ==
5 News was one of the new station's flagship programmes when it launched on 30 March 1997. One of the launch newsreaders was Rob Butler, who became MP for Aylesbury in 2019. It was originally produced by ITN, which at the time also provided the news for Channel 4 and ITV. It was announced on 9 March 2004 that Sky had won the new contract to provide Channel 5 with its news bulletins.

The first Sky-produced bulletin was planned for 3 January 2005 but the 2004 Indian Ocean earthquake and tsunami brought this forward two days in a short Saturday evening update. In January 2009, the contract with Sky was extended to 2012.

Five News pioneered a number of innovations in style, format and content of news and won numerous awards in its early years.

Originally provided by ITN, from 1 January 2005, Sky News took over the contract to provide the news for Channel 5, replacing ITN, which had provided the channel's news service from the channel's launch in 1997. On 14 February 2011, the service was rebranded back to its original name, 5 News, having been called Five News from 2002 until 2011. On 20 February 2012 the contract returned to original provider ITN.

On 18 February 2008, Five News was given a refreshed look with new theme music, and titles, the titles were later refreshed in October of that year to coincide with Five's rebrand. The 7pm edition was also rebranded Five News at 7 and saw the return of presenters standing up to read the news. On 10 August 2009, Channel 5 announced that its Five News at 7 programme would be axed in the autumn of 2009 along with newscaster Isla Traquair, who had presented it. On 28 August 2009, at the end of the programme, Isla announced that it was her last appearance, and on 4 September, Matt Barbet presented the last programme. Five News at 7 was replaced by the hour-long Live from Studio Five, a nightly magazine programme featuring a mix of news and chat, airing from 6:30pm weeknights, from 14 September 2009. The show rivalled the BBC One programme The One Show.

In November 2009, James Partridge of facial disfigurement charity Changing Faces presented the lunchtime news bulletins all week.

On 2 August 2010, Five News at 7 was reinstated, after a change of ownership of the channel. Live from Studio Five was cut to 30 minutes as a result.

On 14 October 2010, Natasha Kaplinsky announced that she was leaving Channel 5 at the end of 2010, having spent much of her three years at the broadcaster on maternity leave.

In February 2011, Emma Crosby was appointed as Kaplinsky's replacement and presenter of the 7pm bulletin, with Barbet hosting the 5pm edition. The service was relaunched as 5 News on 14 February 2011 to match Channel 5's rebranding, with Crosby making her first appearance.

On the 2 September 2011 it was announced that David Kermode, at-the-time editor, would leave 5 News in order to take up an editorial spot on Daybreak. He was replaced by Geoff Hill.

5 News logo from 20 February 2012 to 2014

On 9 January 2012, due to the production handover from Sky News to ITN, the 7pm edition of 5 News was moved to the earlier timeslot of 6:30pm in place of the axed OK! TV. The ITN produced 5 News bulletins relaunched on 20 February 2012 with newscasters Matt Barbet and Emma Crosby retaining their roles as lead newscasters. The bulletin's website and social media offerings were also relaunched at this time.

On 11 June 2012 it was announced Matt Barbet would leave 5 News to join ITV's Daybreak. He left on 26 July 2012 with Emma Crosby now presenting both editions.

In September 2013, ITN announced that Geoff Hill was to leave 5 News to become the new Editor of ITV News. The following month ITN announced that ITV News' Head of Output, Cristina Nicolotti Squires would become the new Editor of 5 News in November 2013.

On 16 April 2014, it was announced on Twitter that following Matt Barbet's departure from Daybreak, he would be returning to 5 News and ITN to present 5 News Tonight – a new show at 6:30pm, replacing NewsTalk Live, on 28 April 2014. Emma Crosby would continue to present 5 News at 5pm.

On 5 November 2015, Emma Crosby announced she was leaving 5 News after five years to have a baby. Sian Williams from BBC News was to replace her in early 2016.

5 News titlecard 2021 to 2026

On 31 October 2016, a new look for 5 News was aired. The 5 News team went back to their old home at the ITN building. The new studio and set included the desk in the shape of a 5.

Until March 2009, Channel 5 had a dedicated team of weather presenters. Sky News weather presenters then provided forecasts for the channel. This changed in November 2010 when Sian Welby joined Channel 5 as weather presenter, with former BBC and ITV meteorologist Kirsty McCabe providing cover.

As of October 2016, Channel 5 Weather is in partnership with the Met Office, with former GMTV weather presenter Clare Nasir fronting most forecasts. Other Met Office forecasters provide cover in Clare's absence.

In September 2021, Ofcom approved the removal of the 6:30 pm news slot by Channel 5 in order for the channel to schedule a new hourlong 5 News at 5 pm, with Neighbours at 6 pm and Eggheads at 6:30 pm. Ofcom's approval of the channel's new conditions recognised that three hours of news would continue between 5 and 8 pm over all main public service broadcasters' channels, and that Channel 5 still committed to delivering more than 280 hours of news each year.

=== 5 News relaunch (2021) ===
The hour-long relaunched 5 News debuted on Channel 5 on 8 November 2021 at 5pm, with the programme still produced for the channel by ITN. It was initially presented by Sian Williams and Claudia-Liza Vanderpuije, with a live reporting team across the UK and a direct WhatsApp link to the presenters, so viewers can get in touch. Channel 5 hoped the relaunched show would complement the Jeremy Vine programme and be as equally vibrant.

In March 2022, five months after 5 News relaunched as an hour-long format, Broadcast reported that Sian Williams will step down as co main presenter after six years. Williams still presented one-off programmes produced by ITN for Channel 5 and continued involvement with the feature Mind Matters with Dr Sian.

On 4 April 2022, Dan Walker was confirmed as leaving BBC Breakfast and the BBC to join 5 News, replacing Sian Williams.

== On-air team ==
=== News presenters ===
Current
2022–	Dan Walker	5 News (Monday–Friday)
2010–	Julian Druker	Stand-in presenter, Correspondent for 5 News
2011–2016, 2019–	Emma Crosby	Stand-in presenter
2012–	Sangeeta Kandola	5 News Lunchtime, 5 News Weekend
2019–	Olivia Kinsley	5 News Lunchtime, 5 News updates
2015–	Dani Sinha	5 News at 5 stand-in, 5 News Lunchtime, 5 News updates
2017–	Katherine Nash	5 News at 5 stand-in, 5 News Lunchtime, 5 News updates
2022–	Alyx Barker	5 News Lunchtime, 5 News updates
2019–	Mark McQuillan	5 News Lunchtime, 5 News Updates
2020–	Anila Dhami	5 News Lunchtime, 5 News Weekend, 5 News Updates

Former
1997–2000	Roland Buerk
1997–2004	Rob Butler
1997–2005	Charlie Stayt
1997–2000, 2002–2007	Kirsty Young
1998–2000	Jasmine Lowson
1999–2014	Catherine Jones
1999–2001, 2008	Faye Barker
2000–2001	Andrea Catherwood
2000–2008	Jonas Hurst
2001–2005	Louisa Preston
2002–2003, 2010–2012	Julie MacDonald
2004–2008	Kate Gerbeau
2005–2006	Barbara Serra
2005–2007	Priya Kaur-Jones
2005–2009	Helen Fospero
2006–2007	John Suchet
2007–2009	Isla Traquair
2007–12, 2014–2017	Matt Barbet
2008–2010	Natasha Kaplinsky
2009–2012	Gemma Morris
2009	Phil Lavelle
2009–2012	Philippa Hall
2009–2014	Polly Whitehouse
2010	Charlotte Hawkins
2011–2015	Emma Crosby
2012–2014	Simon Pusey
2012–2014	Natalie Verney
2012–2014	Chloe Culpan
2012–2014	Katie Goodman
2014	Lucrezia Millarini
2016–2022	Sian Williams
2018–2024	Claudia-Liza Vanderpuije

=== Weather presenters ===
Current
2012–	Clare Nasir

Former
2008–2012	Lisa Burke
2010–2012	Nazaneen Ghaffar
2006–2012	Isobel Lang
2003–2009	Lara Lewington
2013–2016	Kirsty McCabe
2005–2012	Denise Nurse
2005–2010	Lucy Verasamy
2010–2016	Sian Welby
2005–2012	Jo Wheeler
2005–2012	Francis Wilson
2016–2017	Chris Page

=== Correspondents ===
Current
2000–	Andy Bell	Political Editor	
2011–	Tessa Chapman	Chief Correspondent	
2005–	Leyla Hayes	News Correspondent	
1999–	Catherine Jones	Health Correspondent	
2007–	Sangeeta Kandola	News Correspondent	Newsreader (freelancer)
1997–	Peter Lane	News Correspondent	
2005–	Ruth Liptrot	News Correspondent	
2015–	Dani Sinha	News Correspondent	Newsreader
1997–	Simon Vigar	Royal Correspondent	Newsreader
2019–	Alan Jenkins	Scotland Reporter	
2020–	Anila Dhami	News Correspondent	Newsreader
2022–	Bradley Harris	News Correspondent	
2017–	Katherine Nash	News Correspondent	Newsreader

== Features ==
- 5 News originally provided afternoon and evening updates on the hour, every hour during the week.
- A 'ticker' was used during these updates, the first seen on a terrestrial news broadcast, outside of a simulcast with a news channel. This was switched to a weather ticker before being dropped entirely in 2007.
- A presenter standing up or 'perching' rather than sitting behind a desk (which has since been used by other broadcasters). This feature was banned by the channel in 2007, with presenters at the seating area for all bulletins, although the presenters stood again when 5 News was relaunched in February 2011.
- On air 'teases' from production staff
- Live discussions involving various experts, campaigners, celebrities and political commentators
- Guest editors – these included Ms. Dynamite, Dame Kelly Holmes, Howard Marks and Alastair Campbell
- Your News, a segment of most bulletins given over to viewers' videos and now adapted by many other news programmes under the banner 'user-generated content'
- On-screen email addresses were shown for reporters while they're on air, a feature previously seen in newspapers. This was dropped a few months after introduction.
- When the contract transferred to Sky News, Five News was the first programme to broadcast (and, for the first time, in widescreen) from the news centre at Sky's headquarters in Osterley.
