= Katherine Jones =

Katherine Jones may refer to:

- Katherine Jones, Viscountess Ranelagh (1615–1691), Irish scientist and also a political and religious philosopher
- Katherine Jones (academic), professor of regulatory biology
- Katherine Davies Jones (1860–1943), American botanist

== See also ==
- Catherine Jones (disambiguation), including people known as Kate or Katie Jones
