= Huron Street =

Huron Street may refer to:

- Huron Street Historic District, Berlin, Wisconsin, US
- Huron Street, highway at Canadian end of Sault Ste. Marie International Bridge
- Huron Street, Toronto; location of St. Thomas's, Huron Street and on List of University of Toronto buildings
- Huron Street, major artery among List of roads in London, Ontario
- Huron Street, major artery of Ann Arbor and Ypsilanti, Michigan
- Huron Street, formerly north boundary of London, with Middlesex
- Huron Street, Chicago, divided into East Huron Street and West Huron Street
- Huron Street (album), by Don Ross, 2001
