= August Smith =

August Smith may refer to:

- August E. Smith (1879–1969), American educator, businessman, and politician
- August Smith (DC Comics)
- August Ransom Smith, a character in the TV series Peacemaker
