= Julie MacDonald =

Julie MacDonald may refer to:

- Julie A. MacDonald (born 1955), former U.S. Department of the Interior official
- Julie MacDonald (journalist), Scottish journalist and presenter, currently working for Al Jazeera English
- Julie Fader, also credited as Julie MacDonald, Canadian musician, songwriter and visual artist

== See also ==
- Julie McDonald (disambiguation)
