= Bill Butler (safety) =

American football player (1937–2025)

No. 22, 20
- Positions: Defensive back, halfback

Personal information
- Born: July 10, 1937; Berlin, Wisconsin, U.S.
- Died: November 28, 2025 (aged 88)
- Listed height: 5 ft 10 in (1.78 m)
- Listed weight: 189 lb (86 kg)

Career information
- High school: Berlin
- College: Chattanooga
- NFL draft: 1959: 19th round, 217th overall pick

Career history

Playing
- Green Bay Packers (1959); Dallas Cowboys (1960); Pittsburgh Steelers (1961); Minnesota Vikings (1962–1964); Saskatchewan Roughriders (1965)

Coaching
- Winnipeg Blue Bombers (1967–1968) Assistant coach

Career NFL statistics
- Rushing yards: 108
- Rushing average: 3.7
- Receptions: 6
- Receiving yards: 95
- Interceptions: 11
- Fumble recoveries: 17
- Stats at Pro Football Reference

William R. Butler (July 10, 1937 – November 28, 2025) was an American professional football player who was a defensive back and halfback in the National Football League (NFL) for the Green Bay Packers, Dallas Cowboys, Pittsburgh Steelers and Minnesota Vikings. He played college football for the Chattanooga Mocs. He also played professionally for the Saskatchewan Roughriders in the Canadian Football League (CFL).

== Background ==
Butler attended Berlin High School. He accepted a football scholarship from the University of Tennessee at Chattanooga.

In 1988, he was inducted into the UTC Athletics Hall of Fame. He died on November 28, 2025, at the age of 88.

== Professional career ==
=== Green Bay packers ===
Butler was selected by the Green Bay Packers in the 19th round (217th overall) of the 1959 NFL draft. Although he was initially waived in training camp, he was re-signed after the team cut fellow rookie Tim Brown.

He led the team in kickoff (21 returns - 22.5-yard avg.) and punt returns (18 returns - 9.1 average). He returned a punt for a 61-yard touchdown in a 28–17 loss against the Chicago Bears.

=== Dallas Cowboys ===
Butler was selected by the Dallas Cowboys in the 1960 NFL expansion draft and was moved to defense, becoming the first starting free safety in franchise history. He ranked second in the league in punt returns (10.1-yard avg.) and also had 20 kickoff returns with a 19.1-yard average.

On December 21, he was traded along with offensive tackle Dick Klein to the Pittsburgh Steelers in exchange for safety Dick Moegle.

=== Pittsburgh Steelers ===
In 1961, he had 3 interceptions, while playing 10 games as a backup safety. On April 7, 1962, he was traded to the Minnesota Vikings in exchange for a sixth round draft selection, completing a previous transaction.

=== Minnesota Vikings ===
In 1962, he started 12 games at safety and posted 5 interceptions (second on the team), returning one for a touchdown. He also led the team in kickoff (26 returns - 22.6-yard avg.) and punt returns (12 returns - 14.1-yard avg.).

In 1963, he repeated as the team leader in kickoff (33 returns - 21.6-yard avg.) and punt returns (21 returns - 10.5-yard avg.). In 1964, for the third season in a row, he led the team in kickoff (26 returns - 23-yard avg.) and punt returns (22 returns - 7.1-yard avg.).

=== Saskatchewan Roughriders ===
On August 20, 1965, Butler signed with the Saskatchewan Roughriders of the Canadian Football League (CFL). He was a two-way player and appeared in 12 games. He registered 44 carries for 138 yards (3.1-yard avg.), 16 receptions for 139 yards, one touchdown and 9 kickoff returns for 206 yards (22.9-yard avg.). He announced his retirement the following year.

== Coaching career ==
In 1967, Butler was hired as an assistant football coach at Lakeland College—known now as Lakeland University—in Plymouth, Wisconsin, to serve under John Thome, head football coach.

Butler lived in Berlin, Wisconsin, and was the defensive coordinator for the Ripon High School football team and an assistant track and field coach.
