= Newcomb Spoor =

American farmer, machinist, and politician

Newcomb "Newt" Spoor (March 27, 1852 – September 7, 1935) was an American farmer, machinist, and politician.

Born in Oswego, New York, Spoor and his family moved to Wisconsin and settled in the town of Aurora, Waushara County, Wisconsin. Spoor graduated from Berlin High School and was a farmer and machinist. He moved to Berlin, Wisconsin in 1904. Spoor served in the Wisconsin State Assembly from 1911 to 1917 and in 1923. He was elected as a Republican and then supported United States Senator Robert M. La Follette, Sr. and the Wisconsin Progressive Party. Spoor died at his cabin in Silver Lake, Wisconsin.
