= Gemma Evans (journalist) =

British television presenter and journalist

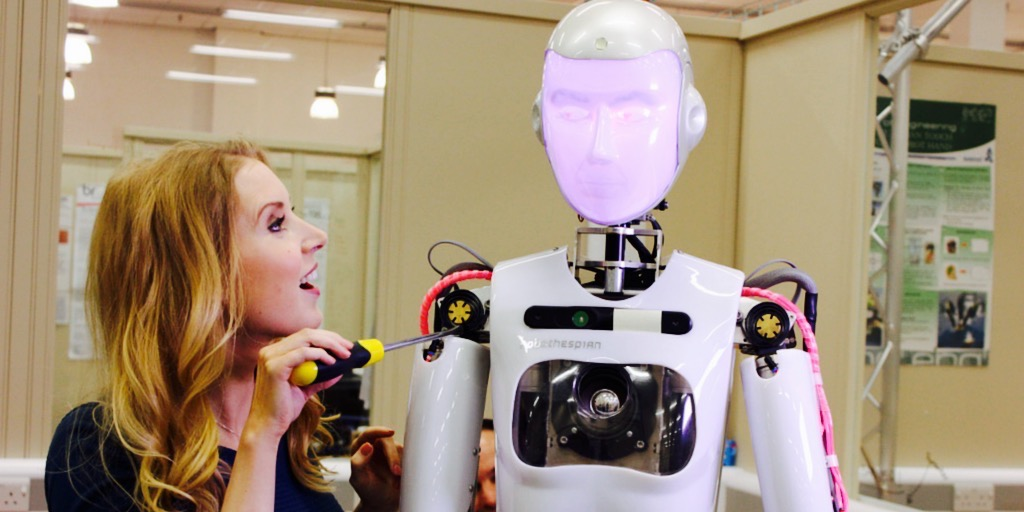
Gemma Evans, Sky News Swipe

Gemma Evans (née Morris) is a British television presenter and journalist. She worked for Sky News from 2006 until 2018, reporting on current affairs and presenting Sky's weekly technology show, Swipe. Gemma was formerly the regular presenter for Channel 5's lunchtime and weekend TV news programmes.

In 2017, Gemma founded healthHackers®, a video and podcast series in which she interviews pioneering figures in health and well-being. Her videos also feature trials with cutting edge health tech devices. The series and YouTube channel were developed out of her passion for health and own personal experiences.

== Early life and education ==
Born in Roehampton and raised in New Malden, she studied at Richmond College before taking up documentary film-making and then a journalism degree at the London College of Communication. She achieved a First Class at university. During this time she worked for the ITV News Channel, as well as for local radio, to gain experience as a producer/reporter. She was also a correspondent for the Houston Chronicle newspaper at their European Bureau after graduating.

== Career ==
Post university, Gemma continued to work as a broadcast journalist at ITN radio and ITV News. She took up an editorial internship with Sky News Radio in 2006, before moving into interactive producing at Sky News, while also working as a presenter for Sky Sports News. She later became a presenter on the Sky News TV channel. Swipe, which Evans hosted, ended in May 2018.

Gemma was a presenter of 5 News bulletins on Channel 5 from 2009 until 2012.

== Other work ==
Away from her broadcasting and television work, Gemma is a supporter of women's initiatives and hosted the FDM Everywoman in Technology Awards in 2016, 2017 and 2018. She also hosted events for the inspiring Leadership Trust, including the charity's launch gala.

She devotes much of her spare time to researching health optimisation through nutrition, exercise, biohacking and the latest tech innovations in health. Some of this has featured in her TV reports.

In May 2017, Gemma married Facebook executive Richard Evans. She changed her surname from Morris to Evans in August of that year.

Gemma relocated to Silicon Valley, California in 2019.
