= Gerald Heaney (magician) =

American magician (1899–1974)

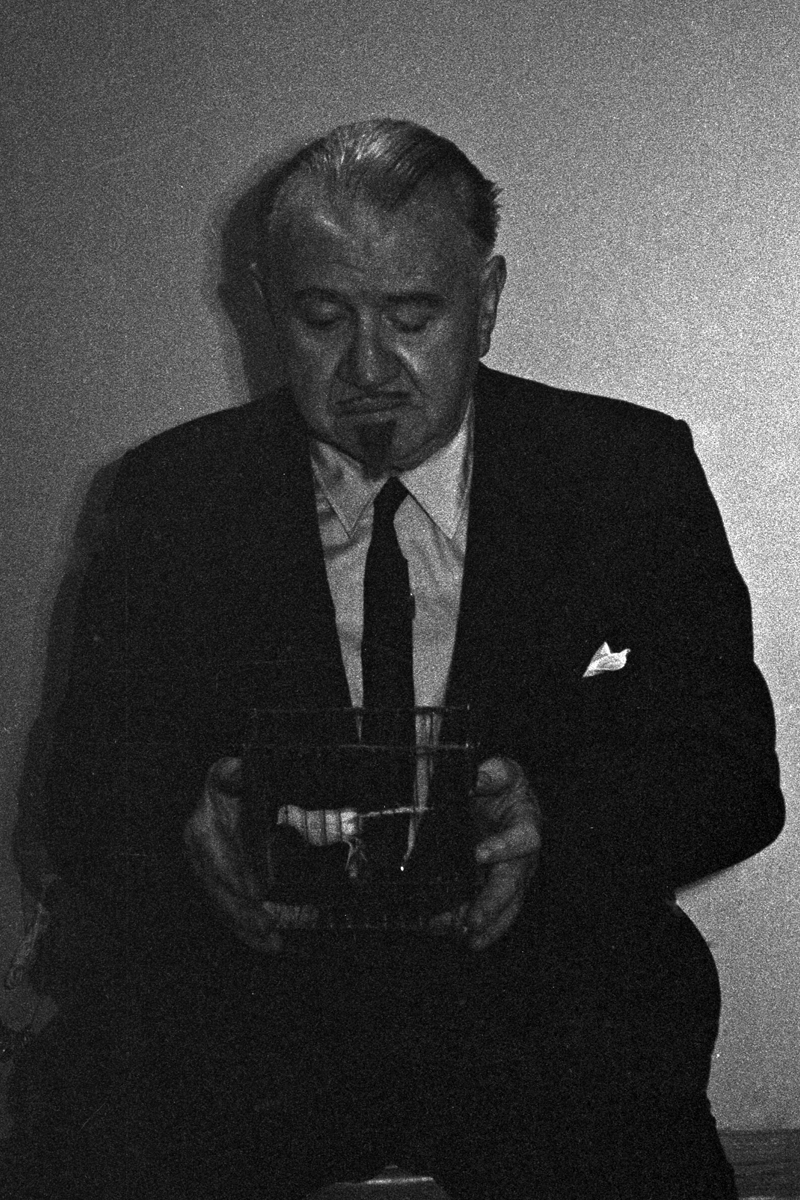
- Gerald Heaney, circa 1965
- Born: Gerald Vincent Heaney; January 26, 1899; Berlin, Wisconsin, US
- Died: December 26, 1974 (aged 75); Oshkosh, Wisconsin, US
- Other name: Heaney the Great
- Occupation: Professional magician
- Years active: 1920s - 1960s
- Spouse: Viola McCarthy
- Parent(s): John & Agnes Heaney

Gerald Vincent Heaney (January 26, 1899 – December 26, 1974) was a stage magician and magic supplier from Berlin, Wisconsin, United States. "Heaney the Great" and his magic show toured North America for a number of years during the mid-20th century.

== Early life ==
Gerald Heaney was born on January 26, 1899, in Berlin, Wisconsin, to John and Agnes Heaney. John Heaney owned a jewelry store in Berlin, one of its earliest businesses. Gerald's interest in magic began at the age of 15 when he met Henry Boughton (Harry Blackstone Sr.).

Boughton was preparing for a performance in Berlin and asked the jeweler to create a piece of equipment for him. Boughton had not yet adopted the Blackstone pseudonym and was billed as "Frederick the Great". Boughton befriended Heaney, at times referring to him as "the kid from Berlin". He and Heaney remained friends until Boughton's death in 1965.

== Career and marriage ==
After his encounter with Blackstone, Heaney became interested in producing magical supplies. When the family jewelry store closed in 1922, Heaney announced that he would devote all of his time to the development of magical goods. To this end, he started a mail order business for magical books, tricks, novelties and other supplies.

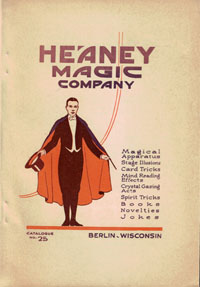
Heaney Magic Company, Catalogue No. 25 (1924)

Heaney married Viola "Vi" McCarthy in Chicago on May 24, 1926. Soon thereafter, the pair met Houdini back-stage after a performance at Chicago's Princess Theater. He asked them to join his group of assistants, and they worked Houdini until a month before his death in October 1926.

Heaney was ambidextrous and became adept at playing card manipulation. He started performing magic by developing a 15-minute vaudeville act using playing cards. Over time, Heaney also became an accomplished illusionist, ventriloquist and hypnotist. The Heaney Magic Show eventually became a touring act that required about five tons of equipment per show.

Photos attest that, like Blackstone, Heaney performed wearing a tie and tails. Heaney's wife, whose stage name was Princess Aloiv, became Heaney's stage supervisor and chief assistant. She also played an organ to provide music for their shows.

Besides Blackstone, Heaney became well-acquainted with Thurston and Dante. After Thurston died in 1936 the Heaneys acquired his illusions, props and personal effects. "It took a box car over 40 feet long", said Heaney. They housed Thurston's equipment at their farm in Berlin, gradually adding some of the illusions to their two-hour show.

The Heaney Magic Show toured in Mexico, Canada and widely throughout the United States until the 1950s. The show never played Europe but the goateed performer made appearances on Chicago and Milwaukee television stations.

== Later years and death ==
In his later years, Heaney maintained his mail order business. Although he stopped touring, he continued to perform at private engagements several times per year. He also preserved his memberships with the International Brotherhood of Magicians and the Society of American Magicians.

Following a four-year illness, Heaney died in Oshkosh on December 26, 1974. Upon his death, Oshkosh magicians Fred Kruse and Curt Walter performed the Broken Wand Ceremony using a golden wand, but left it unbroken to commemorate Heaney's long career.

Heaney and his wife are interred at the Oakwood Cemetery in Berlin.
