= Berlin Journal =

- Type: Weekly newspaper
- Owner(s): Tom and Pam Finger
- Publisher: Tyler Gonyo
- Editor: Scott Mundro
- Founded: 1881
- Headquarters: 301 June Street, P.O. Box 10, Berlin WI 54923
- City: Berlin, Wisconsin
- Country: United States
- Circulation: 2,192 (as of 2022)
- ISSN: 8755-4003
- OCLC number: 11292002
- Website: theberlinjournal.com

The Berlin Journal, formerly The Berlin Evening Journal, is a weekly newspaper published in Berlin, Wisconsin. It is owned by the Berlin Journal Company Inc, which publishes five weekly newspapers in the Green Lake County, Wisconsin area,

== History ==
The newspaper began in 1870. The Journal's editor in 2001 was Robert Gonyo.

In 2025, the Berlin Journal Company Inc. was sold to Finger Printing and Publishing, Inc., owned by Tom and Pam Finger.

== Company profile ==
The Berlin Journal Company Inc. estimates annual sales of $5 to 10 million and employs approximately 20 to 49 people. The company president is Tyler Gonyo.
