= Nelson F. Beckwith =

American politician

Nelson Beckwith

Member of the Wisconsin State Assembly
- In office 1871–1873

Personal details
- Born: April 18, 1813 Rushford, New York
- Died: January 6, 1873 (aged 60) Omro, Wisconsin
- Party: Democratic

Nelson F. Beckwith (April 18, 1813 – January 6, 1873) was an American politician and businessman who served as a member of the Wisconsin State Assembly.

== Biography ==
Beckwith was born on April 18, 1813, in Rushford, New York. He resided in Omro, Wisconsin, where he constructed mills. Beckwith also briefly lived in Berlin, Wisconsin. There, two properties that belonged to him, now known as the Beckwith House Hotel and the Nelson F. Beckwith House, are listed on the National Register of Historic Places.

Beckwith was a member of the Wisconsin State Assembly during the 1872 session. His seat was contested in 1872 because of voting irregularities, but was retained. Previously, Beckwith had been an unsuccessful candidate in 1868. He was Democrat.

He died unexpectedly of heart disease in 1873.
