= Phil Lavelle =

English news presenter (born 1981)

Phil Lavelle (born 1981 in Liverpool, UK) is an English news presenter and reporter who currently serves as a US Correspondent for the international Al Jazeera English TV network.

== Career ==
Lavelle started his career as a trainee journalist with Granada Television, before joining ITV Tyne Tees. He moved to national British broadcaster ITN during the second Gulf War, working as a newsdesk assistant before joining the national Channel 5 network as its youngest ever anchor.

From 2006, he worked as Assistant Programme Editor for two years, as part of the launch-team for the Al Jazeera English news service bureau in London.

Lavelle moved to the BBC to work as a morning TV news Anchor for BBC London News before being poached by the network news to be a Correspondent for BBC Breakfast. He also served a stint as a global Anchor for Sky News and briefly returned as a news correspondent and weekend presenter for Five News.

In 2012, he returned to Al Jazeera as a Europe-based Correspondent covering stories across the continent, including the United Kingdom, France, the Netherlands, Poland, Italy, Cyprus, and Israel & Palestine. In the autumn of 2014, he was featured in the strand 'Al Jazeera Correspondent', with his self-produced documentary, 'My Digital Addiction'.

Lavelle later moved to the United States where he became an LA Correspondent before relocating to Miami where he has extensively covered the US election, 2024 student protests, natural disasters and more for Al Jazeera.

== Personal life ==
Lavelle is married, with two children, and is a keen fitness fan and gym goer.
