= Julie McDonald =

Julie McDonald may refer to:

- Julie McDonald (swimmer, born 1952), Australian Olympic swimmer
- Julie McDonald (swimmer, born 1970), Australian Olympic swimmer
- Julie McDonald (agent) (born 1954), American talent agent
- Julie Jensen McDonald (1929–2013), American author and educator

== See also ==
- Julie MacDonald (disambiguation)
