= Dick Klein (American football) =

American football player (1934–2005)

No. 79, 72, 62, 70
- Positions: Offensive tackle, defensive tackle

Personal information
- Born: February 11, 1934; Pana, Illinois, U.S.
- Died: December 27, 2005 (aged 71); Pana, Illinois, U.S.
- Listed height: 6 ft 4 in (1.93 m)
- Listed weight: 254 lb (115 kg)

Career information
- High school: Schlarman (IL)
- College: Georgia (1951); Iowa (1955-1957)
- NFL draft: 1955: 29th round, 347th overall pick

Career history
- Chicago Bears (1958–1959); Dallas Cowboys (1960); Pittsburgh Steelers (1961); Boston Patriots (1961–1962); Oakland Raiders (1963–1964)

Awards and highlights
- NFL All-rookie team (1958); AFL All Star team (1962); Third-team All-American (1957); Second-team All-Big Ten (1957)

Career NFL/AFL statistics
- Games played: 85
- Games started: 56
- Fumble recoveries: 2
- Sacks: 5
- Stats at Pro Football Reference

Richard James Klein (February 11, 1934 – December 27, 2005) was an American professional football player who was an offensive lineman in the National Football League (NFL) and American Football League (AFL). He played college football for the Iowa Hawkeyes. Klein played professionally in the NFL for the Chicago Bears and Dallas Cowboys, and in the AFL for the Boston Patriots and Oakland Raiders.

== Early life ==
Klein attended Schlarman High School and accepted a scholarship from the University of Georgia. He played on the freshman team, before leaving school to join the Navy during the Korean War.

After leaving his military commitment in 1956, Klein chose to join the University of Iowa over other schools. He was a teammate of Alex Karras and became the starter at right tackle and defensive tackle.

The next year, Klein was named an honorable-mention All-American. Head coach Forest Evashevski allowed his release with a year of eligibility still remaining, in order for him to join the Chicago Bears in the National Football League.

== Professional career ==
=== Chicago Bears ===
Klein was selected by the Chicago Bears in the 29th round (347th overall) of the 1955 NFL draft, after his original class had graduated, although his college eligibility was not completed.

Klein was a war veteran and only began his professional career in 1958. He was waived before the start of the 1960 season.

=== Dallas Cowboys ===
On September 10, 1960, Klein was claimed off waivers by the Dallas Cowboys. He only played in seven games (four starts) because of a broken shoulder. On December 22, he was traded to the Pittsburgh Steelers along with safety Bill Butler, in exchange for safety Dick Moegle.

=== Pittsburgh Steelers ===
In 1961, Klein played in two games for Pittsburgh before being released.

=== Boston Patriots ===
On October 4, 1961, Klein was signed as a free agent by the Boston Patriots of the American Football League. The next year, he was named to the AFL All Star team as a defensive tackle. On August 7, 1963, Klein's rights were sold to the Oakland Raiders.

=== Oakland Raiders ===
Klein played two seasons for the Oakland Raiders, both as a defensive tackle and offensive tackle.
