= Wisconsin Power and Light Berlin Power Plant =

- U.S. National Register of Historic Places
- Location: 143 Water St., Berlin, Wisconsin
- Coordinates: 43°58′10″N 88°57′03″W
- Area: less than one acre
- Built: 1925
- Architectural style: Commercial Style
- NRHP reference No.: 92000157
- Added to NRHP: March 19, 1992

The Wisconsin Power and Light Berlin Power Plant is located in Berlin, Wisconsin.

== History ==
Built in 1925 by Wisconsin Power & Light, the power plant is located on the bank of the Fox River. It was added to the State and the National Register of Historic Places in 1992.
