= Nathan Strong Park Historic District =

Historic district in Wisconsin, United States

- U.S. National Register of Historic Places
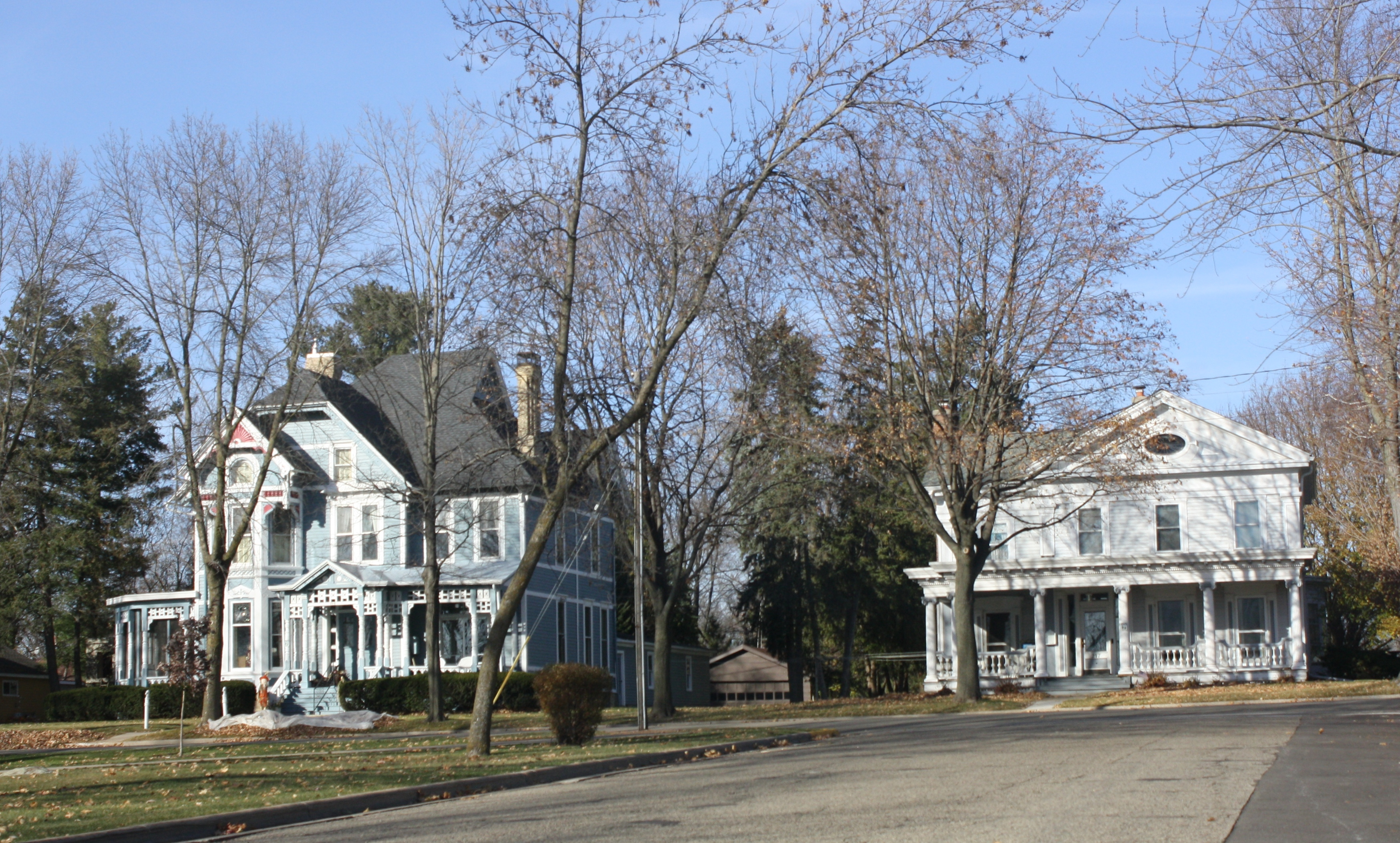
- A portion of the district.
- Location: Roughly bounded by N. Wisconsin, E. Moore, N. Swetting and E. Huron Sts., Berlin, Wisconsin
- Coordinates: 43.9702°N 88.94295°W
- Area: 46 acres (19 ha)
- NRHP reference No.: 05000423
- Added to NRHP: May 10, 2005

The Nathan Strong Park Historic District is located in Berlin, Wisconsin.

== Description ==
The district is a residential neighborhood surrounding a city park named for Berlin's founder, with houses in a variety of styles including the 1849 Gothic Revival Ayers house, the 1854 Greek Revival Ward house, the 1858 Italianate Benham house, the 1881 Second Empire Rounds house, the 1881 Queen Anne Williams house, the 1898 Stick/Gothic style Union Church, the 1911 Neoclassical Hitchcock house, the 1911 Talbot bungalow, the 1915 Craftsman Safford house, the 1930 Tudor Revival Kreuter House, and the 1940 French Provincial Voeltner House.
