= Julie MacDonald (journalist) =

Scottish journalist and presenter

Julie Marion MacDonald is a Scottish journalist and presenter, currently working freelance with Al Jazeera English.

== Career ==
MacDonald trained as a journalist at City University, London. Her radio credits began at LBC – as producer of The Simon Bates Breakfast Show and Nick Ferrari in the Morning. Moving into TV – MacDonald began her TV journalist career (2000–2001) with the ITV News Channel and in 2002 became Channel 5 entertainment correspondent and fronting the channel's flagship breakfast show and news bulletins, including Core News and The Edit for 5 News.

MacDonald moved away from network news in 2003, when she became one of the BBC Liquid News reporters and weekend presenter, reporting on entertainment stories of the day for BBC Three and BBC News. She continued to work in radio as a member of Simon Mayo’s Five Live Panel, a weekly team contributing their views on TV and media news. She occasionally also worked alongside Jono Coleman on LBC's early weekend shows. In 2004, MacDonald worked red carpet events for the ITN produced London Tonight on ITV London, also reporting on the day's news output.

In 2005, MacDonald signed up to the Al Jazeera English News Channel as a News Anchor to be based at its headquarters in Doha. MacDonald was one of the original Al Jazeera News Readers when the channel launched in November 2006. After spending two years at the headquarters in Doha, she is now one of the News Anchors and programme presenters in the bureau in London. Recent programmes include Artsworld on Al Jazeera.

MacDonald is also attached to the Sky Living project Conversations with a Serial Killer as an investigative journalist. In 2005, MacDonald trained as a Life Coach and now runs her own coaching practice.

In 2010, she began newsreading and reporting for the Sky News produced 5 News for Channel 5.

In 2013, MacDonald presented an episode of 'Correspondent' on Al Jazeera with the Scottish independence referendum the subject matter. In this, MacDonald stated that she voted against Scottish Devolution in the 1997 referendum and that she was against Independence in the 2014 referendum.

MacDonald also appeared on the 9:00 AM Eastern Time edition of Newshour, when it was simulcasted on Al Jazeera America.
