= August E. Smith =

American politician

August E. Smith (August 27, 1879 – January 30, 1969) was an American educator, businessman, and politician.

Born in Berlin, Wisconsin, Smith graduated from University of Wisconsin in 1901. He was the principal at Cashton High School in Cashton, Wisconsin and taught at the Viroqua High School in Viroqua, Wisconsin. He married Edith Ogden (1887–1955) in 1905. He was the first principal of the Vernon County Teachers College from 1907 to 1920, and was in the insurance business. By 1924 Smith had established a local chapter of the Ku Klux Klan, and used his insurance office in Viroqua as headquarters. Smith served on the Viroqua Common Council and was mayor of the city. Smith served in the Wisconsin State Assembly from 1923 to 1929 and was a Republican. Smith was an assistant secretary to Wisconsin Governor Fred R. Zimmerman and was executive secretary of the Wisconsin Good Roads Association. Smith died in Viroqua, Wisconsin in a nursing home.
