= Simon Pusey =

English journalist

Simon Pusey (born October 1986) is an English journalist and television presenter at BBC World News and Sky News.

== Early life ==
Pusey grew up in Winchester and attended Winchester College. He graduated from the University of Bristol before completing a postgraduate diploma in broadcast journalism at Cardiff University.

== Journalism career ==
Pusey joined the BBC in 2009 as a broadcast journalist on the news programme Wales Today. In 2010, Pusey was appointed the Mid Wales Correspondent, reporting on TV, Radio and Online.

In 2011 he joined Sky News working as a reporter for Channel 5 News. When Channel 5 News moved to ITN in 2012, Pusey became a presenter, anchoring the lunchtime and evening bulletins. A year later he moved to Beijing, becoming China Central Television's main English speaking sports anchor. In 2014, Pusey returned to London, joining Arise News as a news and sports presenter.

By May 2019, Pusey was presenting for BBC World News.

== Personal life ==
Pusey lives in Soho, London.
