= Katie.com: My Story =

2000 memoir by Katherine Tarbox

- Author: Katherine Tarbox
- Language: English
- Genre: Memoir
- Publisher: Dutton
- Publication date: April 2000
- Publication place: United States

Katie.com: My Story (later renamed A Girl's Life Online after a domain name dispute) is a memoir by American author Katherine Tarbox. The book was published by Dutton in April 2000.

== Synopsis ==
The book chronicles a life changing event in the author's life while growing up in New Canaan, Connecticut. At the age of 13, Tarbox met an older man in an internet chat room, which led to a secret online relationship and, several months later, a meeting in a Texas motel where she was molested. The incident was interrupted by her mother and hotel security who were informed of the secret meeting by a friend of Tarbox. Her attacker, Francis Kufrovich, was sentenced to 18 months in prison but the ordeal left Tarbox feeling emotionally abandoned.

== Reception ==
The title of the book was originally intended to be Girl.com but was changed to Katie.com despite that domain name already belonging to a British chat room operator, Katie Jones, who was using it for her personal website. The book's title created the false perception that Jones was in some way associated with the book and its story. According to Jones, she was contacted by an attorney for the publisher, Parry Aftab, who tried to coerce her into releasing control of the domain name. Jones refused and wrote about the incident in her blog, causing Aftab to back down. When the paperback version was issued by Plume, part of the Penguin Group, in 2001, the copyright page of the book disavowed any connection with the real-life website. In 2004, Tarbox issued a press release apologizing to Jones and announcing the book's new title: A Girl's Life Online.
