= Gemma Evans =

Gemma Evans may refer to:

- Gemma Evans (journalist)
- Gemma Evans (footballer)
