= Nelson F. Beckwith House =

Historic house in Wisconsin, United States

- U.S. National Register of Historic Places
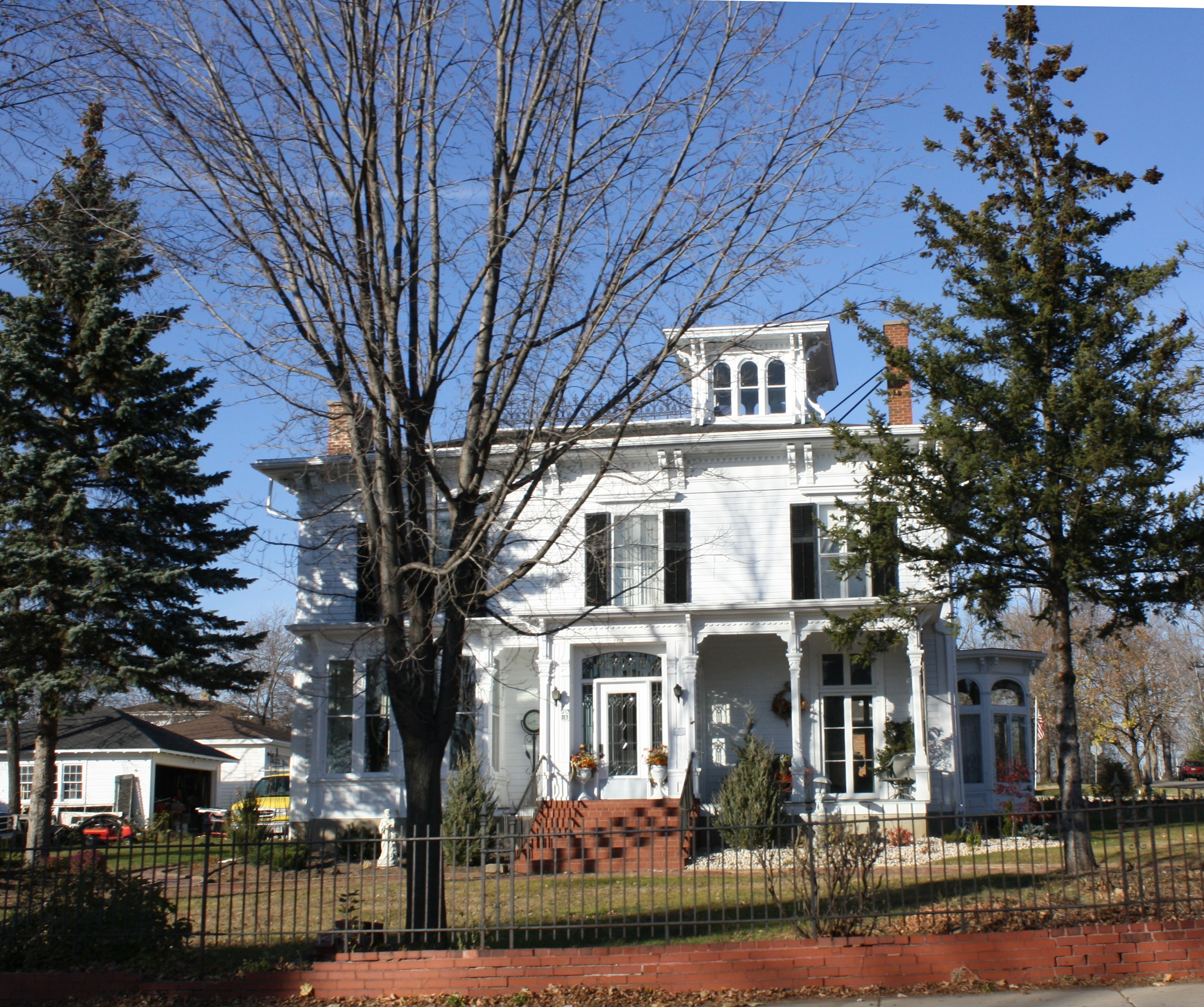

- Location within Wisconsin Location within the United States
- Location: 179 E. Huron St. Berlin, Wisconsin
- Coordinates: 43°58′7″N 88°56′35″W
- Built: 1858
- Architectural style: Exotic Revival/Italianate
- NRHP reference No.: 90000575
- Added to NRHP: April 6, 1990

The Nelson F. Beckwith House is a historic house located at 179 East Huron Street in Berlin, Wisconsin, United States. It was added to the State Register of Historic Places and the National Register of Historic Places in 1990.

Nelson F. Beckwith was a member of the Wisconsin State Assembly and also owned the Beckwith House Hotel.

Home of the Llewellyn J. Walker family from 1944, this Italianate house has 12 foot ceilings, front and back stairs, and bonus rooms over the kitchen. A two-story center entrance hall with curving staircase opens on one side to a large dining room with bay and on the other side to a 35 foot long living room, with a bay deep enough for couches and table. Both rooms have marble fireplaces surmounted by large mirrors and every room is ringed with deep cove moldings. The windows are floor to ceiling French doors which open in. Next to the living room is a library with built in bookshelves and desk, and behind the dining room are the large eat-in kitchen, a play room or home office, a back hall, and a powder room. Upstairs are three very large bedrooms and a bathroom which opens into a back hall and two rooms for storage space or bedrooms. In earlier years, these were maids’ rooms. Off them, there is a back stairway. From the street, one can see the cupola and widow's walk. The curving front drive is brick, and the house is partially surrounded by a brick and wrought iron fence. The cement back driveway ends at the double garage. Described as “one of the most imposing houses in the city” in “Early Houses In Berlin, Wisconsin and the People who Lived in Them ” by Lu Gillette published in 1976, this property Is listed on the National Register of Historic Places. Built by an early settler of what was then “Strong’s Landing” in 1857 in the Italianate style, the house sits on a double wide lot next to the public park on Huron Street in the city of Berlin, Green Lake County, Wisconsin. Berlin is not only an historic town on the Fox River which was part of the passageway from Green Bay to the Mississippi River followed by explorers such as Marquette and Joliet, but this area was also home to the Mascoutin tribe of Native Americans.

Llewellyn Walker founded the Walker Agency, an independent insurance agency in Berlin in 1940. His son, Jeffrey William Walker took over when Llewellyn retired, and in 2018 the agency was headed by Jeff's son, Gregory William Walker in partnership with his son, Matthew. Llewellyn and Virginia's daughter, Diana Walker Nelson was a member of the Illinois House of Representatives from 1970 - 74.
