= Berlin High School (Wisconsin) =

Coordinates: 43°58′36.3″N 88°56′28.8″W

- 222 Memorial Drive; Berlin, Wisconsin 54923; United States

Information
- Type: Public
- School district: Berlin Area School District
- Principal: Bryant Bednareck
- Teaching staff: 40.45 (on FTE basis)
- Grades: 9 to 12
- Enrollment: 475 (2023-2024)
- Student to teacher ratio: 11.74
- Colors: Red and Green
- Athletics conference: WIAA District 4 Eastern Valley Conference
- Mascot: Indians
- Website: Berlin High School

Berlin High School is a public high school located in Berlin, Wisconsin. The school educates about 600 students in grades 9 to 12 in the Berlin Area School District. The school's mascot is the Indians. It replaced the former high school, now listed on the National Register of Historic Places.

== Notable alumni ==
- Bill Butler, former NFL player
