= Kate L. Jones =

British-American nuclear physicist

Katherine Louise Grzywacz-Jones (published as Kate L. Jones) is an experimental nuclear physicist whose work uses low-energy nuclear reactions to study the structure of atomic nuclei, especially nuclei with sizes and charges near those of doubly magic tin-132. Born and educated in England, she has worked in Germany and lives in the US, where she is a professor of physics and divisional dean for natural sciences and mathematics in the College of Arts and Sciences at the University of Tennessee.

== Education and career ==
Jones is originally from Canvey Island in Essex. She studied physics with acoustics at the University of Surrey, receiving a bachelor's degree with honours in 1996, and worked for a year as an acoustical engineer. Finding the work uninspiring, she returned to the University of Surrey for graduate study, and completed her Ph.D. in experimental nuclear physics in 2000.

After postdoctoral research at the GSI Helmholtz Centre for Heavy Ion Research in Darmstadt, Germany, and at Oak Ridge National Laboratory in the US through a program at Rutgers University, she joined the University of Tennessee as an assistant professor in 2006. She was promoted to associate professor in 2012 and full professor in 2017, and was named as divisional dean in 2023.

== Recognition ==
Jones was elected as a Fellow of the American Physical Society (APS) in 2018, after a nomination from the APS Division of Nuclear Physics, "for important contributions to understanding the structure of neutron-rich and weakly bound nuclei, in particular from neutron transfer reactions with radioactive 132Sn beams".

== Personal life ==
When the 1999 James Bond spy film The World Is Not Enough was released, Jones became involved in its publicity, through the coincidence of having a similar name and occupation to one of the film characters, nuclear physicist Christmas Jones.

Jones is married to Robert Grzywacz, also a nuclear physicist at the University of Tennessee; they met when she was doing her postdoctoral research, and he joined the University of Tennessee three years prior to Jones.
