= Neil Montier =

Neil Montier is a London-born photographer and digital artist.

== Photography ==
Montier's work deals with subjects of social placement, the built environment and London itself. His working method is a combination of new and old photographic techniques where slight digital manipulation crosses with analogue.

Montier studied at the London College of Printing and has since exhibited at the Photographers' Gallery, where he was selected for the "Fresh Faced and Wild Eyed" exhibition. Montier's work has also been exhibited in the Notting Hill Arts Club, the New London Architecture Building and the Rokeby Gallery.
