= Daniel and Catherine Ketchum Cobblestone House =

Historic house in Wisconsin, United States

- Ketchum, Daniel and Caltherine, Cobblestone House
- U.S. National Register of Historic Places
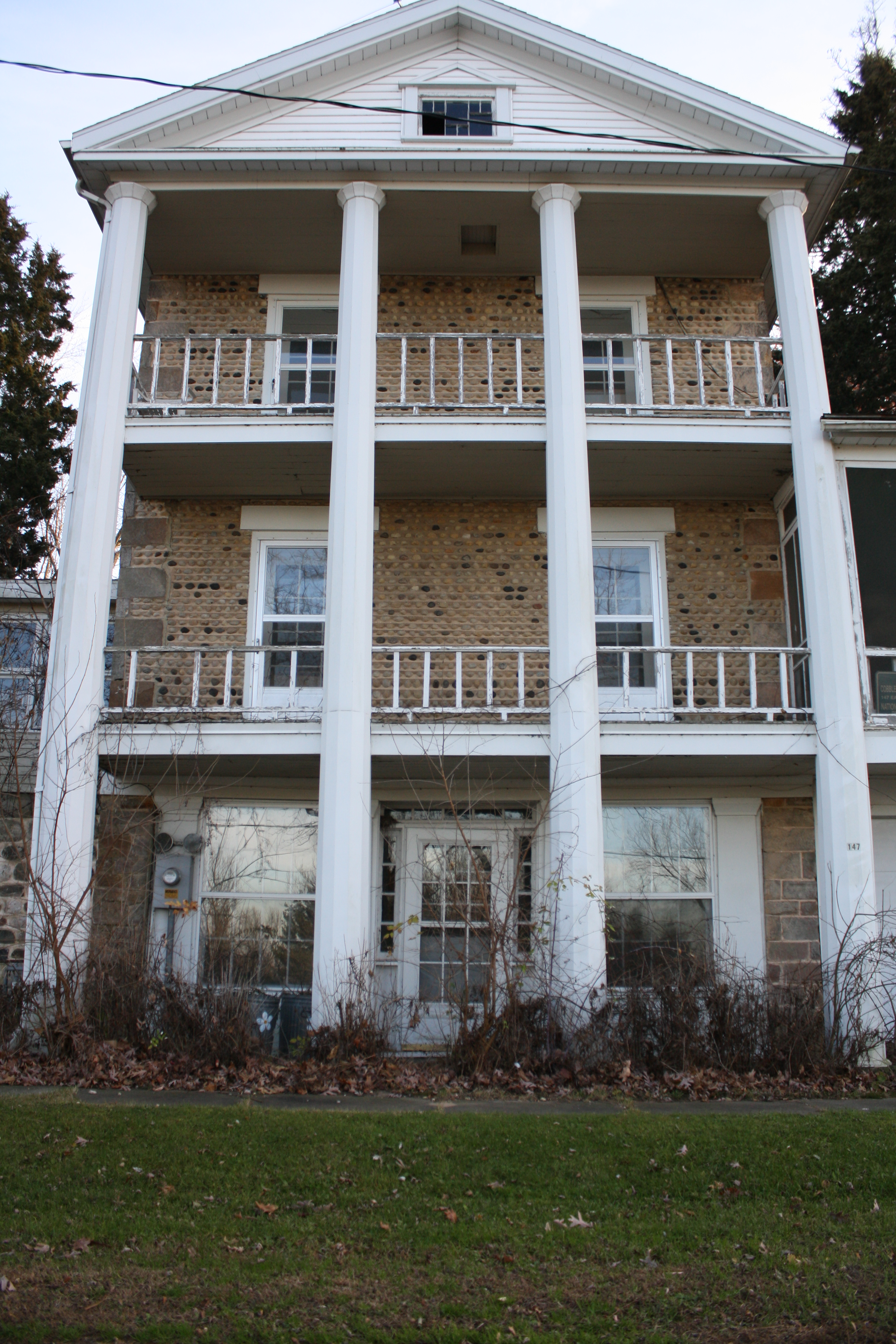
- Daniel and Catherine Ketchum Cobblestone House
- Location: 147 E. Second St., Marquette, Wisconsin
- Coordinates: 43°44′53″N 89°08′23″W
- Area: less than one acre
- Built: 1851
- Architect: John Baldwin
- Architectural style: Greek Revival
- NRHP reference No.: 01000397
- Added to NRHP: April 19, 2001

The Daniel and Catherine Ketchum Cobblestone House is located in Marquette, Wisconsin.

== History ==
Daniel Ketchum was a prominent sea captain and his wife, Catherine, was a member of the Van Rensselaer family. During the 1920s and 1930s, it was used as the lodge for a ducking hunting club. It was added to the State and the National Register of Historic Places in 2001.
