= Berlin, Wisconsin =

- City
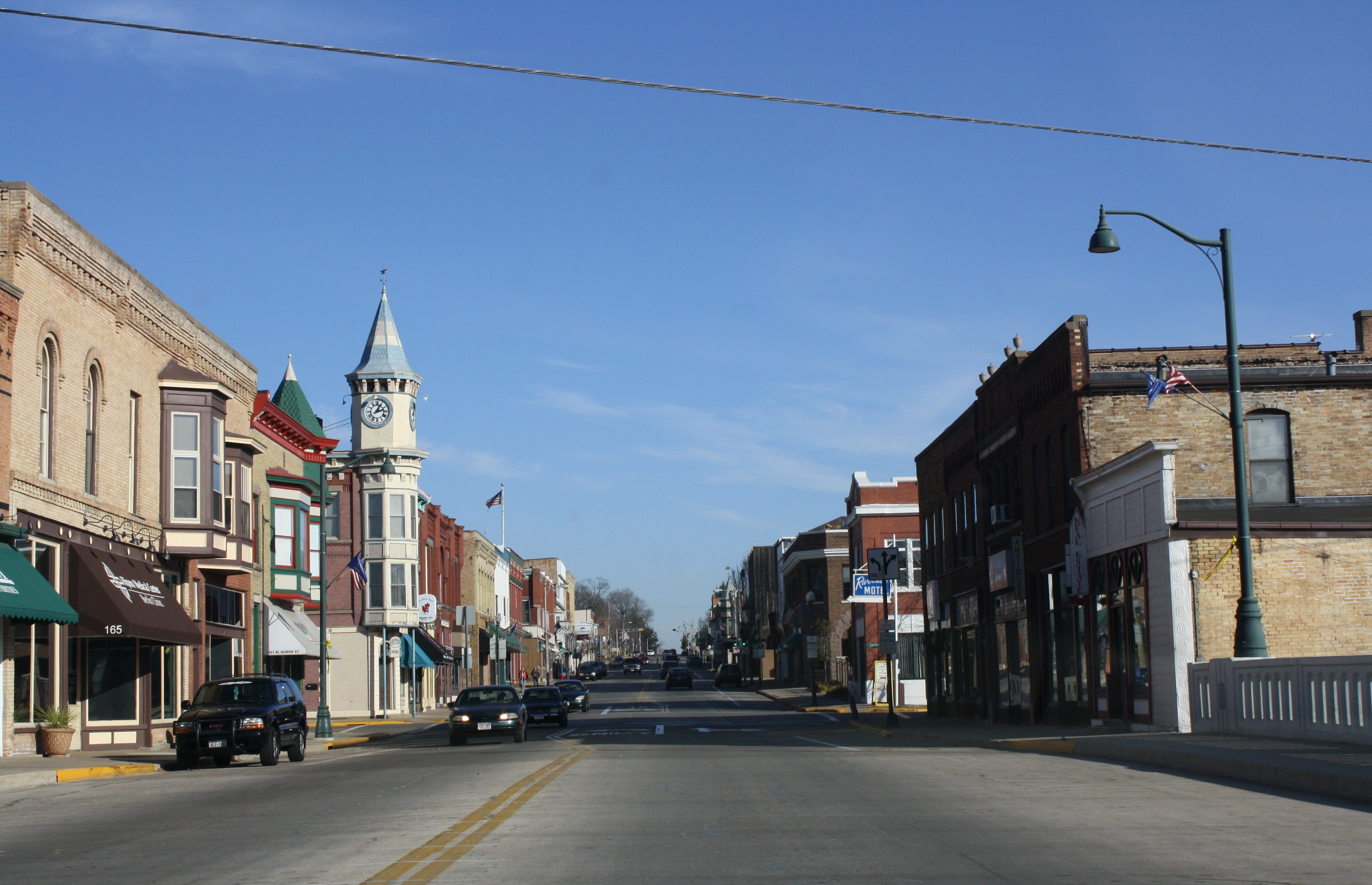
- Downtown Berlin
- Nickname: The Fur and Leather City
- Location of Berlin in Waushara County (northern portion) and Green Lake County (southern portion), Wisconsin.

- Location within Wisconsin Location within the United States
- Coordinates: 43°58′11″N 88°56′55″W
- Country: United States
- State: Wisconsin
- Counties: Green Lake, Waushara

Area
  - Total: 6.39 sq mi (16.55 km^{2})
  - Land: 5.78 sq mi (14.97 km^{2})
  - Water: 0.61 sq mi (1.58 km^{2})
- Elevation: 807 ft (246 m)

Population (2020)
  - Total: 5,571
  - Density: 931.4/sq mi (359.61/km^{2})
- Time zone: UTC-6 (Central (CST))
  - Summer (DST): UTC-5 (CDT)
- Area code: 920
- FIPS code: 55-06925
- GNIS feature ID: 1561600
- Website: cityofberlin.net

Berlin (/ˈbɜːrlɪn/ BUR-lin) is a city in Green Lake and Waushara counties in the U.S. state of Wisconsin. The population was 5,571 at the 2020 census. Of this, 5,435 were in Green Lake County, and only 89 were in Waushara County. The city is located mostly within the Town of Berlin in Green Lake County, with a small portion extending into the Town of Aurora in Waushara County.

== History ==
In 1845, Nathan H. Strong (1813–1852) became the first resident of what is today Berlin. He was joined by Hugh G. Martin, Hiram Barnes, and William Dickey. Their settlement was known as Strong's Landing. In 1848, a post office was established. It was named Berlin after the capital of Prussia, now the capital of Germany. The first school house was built in 1850 and the first church in 1851. Berlin was incorporated as a city in 1857.

Wisconsin's commercial cranberry industry was started in the Berlin area, as well as the first milk condensing factory in the mid-west, Carnation Company. From the mid-1860s to the 1990s, Berlin was called "the fur and leather city" due to its industry. These industries provided jobs and attracted immigrants from Scotland, Wales, Poland, and Italy to work.

On April 3, 1956 the eastern sections of the city were impacted by an F4 tornado which claimed 7 lives.

=== Pronunciation ===
Area residents put the accent on the first syllable of Berlin /ˈbɜːrlɪn/ rather than on the second. It has been said that this was in reaction to the anti-German sentiment that swept across the United States during World War I, and that the accent was previously on the second syllable.

== Geography ==
The Fox River runs north-south through the center of the city.

According to the United States Census Bureau, the city has a total area of 6.36 square miles (16.47 km^{2}), of which, 5.78 square miles (14.97 km^{2}) is land and 0.58 square miles (1.50 km^{2}) is water.

== Demographics ==
Historical population
Census	Pop.	Note	%±
1860	1,449		—
1870	2,777		91.6%
1880	3,353		20.7%
1890	4,149		23.7%
1900	4,489		8.2%
1910	4,636		3.3%
1920	4,400		−5.1%
1930	4,106		−6.7%
1940	4,247		3.4%
1950	4,693		10.5%
1960	4,838		3.1%
1970	5,338		10.3%
1980	5,478		2.6%
1990	5,371		−2.0%
2000	5,305		−1.2%
2010	5,524		4.1%
2020	5,571		0.9%
U.S. Decennial Census

=== 2010 census ===
As of the census of 2010, there were 5,524 people, 2,296 households, and 1,423 families residing in the city. The population density was 955.7 inhabitants per square mile (369.0/km^{2}). There were 2,561 housing units at an average density of 443.1 per square mile (171.1/km^{2}). The racial makeup of the city was 93.4% White, 0.5% African American, 0.6% Native American, 0.9% Asian, 3.6% from other races, and 1.0% from two or more races. Hispanic or Latino of any race were 8.0% of the population.

There were 2,296 households, of which 31.3% had children under the age of 18 living with them, 44.4% were married couples living together, 11.8% had a female householder with no husband present, 5.7% had a male householder with no wife present, and 38.0% were non-families. 32.0% of all households were made up of individuals, and 14.9% had someone living alone who was 65 years of age or older. The average household size was 2.38 and the average family size was 3.00.

The median age in the city was 39 years. 25.8% of residents were under the age of 18; 7.2% were between the ages of 18 and 24; 24.8% were from 25 to 44; 25.7% were from 45 to 64; and 16.4% were 65 years of age or older. The gender makeup of the city was 48.5% male and 51.5% female.

=== 2000 census ===
As of the census of 2000, there were 5,305 people, 2,170 households, and 1,425 families residing in the city. The population density was 887.4 people per square mile (342.5/km^{2}). There were 2,391 housing units at an average density of 400.0 per square mile (154.4/km^{2}). The racial makeup of the city was 95.70% White, 0.15% Black or African American, 0.28% Native American, 0.77% Asian, 0.02% Pacific Islander, 2.47% from other races, and 0.60% from two or more races. 4.56% of the population were Hispanic or Latino of any race.

There were 2,170 households, out of which 31.5% had children under the age of 18 living with them, 51.8% were married couples living together, 9.4% had a female householder with no husband present, and 34.3% were non-families. 30.3% of all households were made up of individuals, and 15.3% had someone living alone who was 65 years of age or older. The average household size was 2.39 and the average family size was 2.96.

In the city, the population was spread out, with 25.1% under the age of 18, 7.4% from 18 to 24, 28.1% from 25 to 44, 21.4% from 45 to 64, and 18.0% who were 65 years of age or older. The median age was 38 years. For every 100 females, there were 92.2 males. For every 100 females age 18 and over, there were 88.4 males.

The median income for a household in the city was $36,896, and the median income for a family was $44,922. Males had a median income of $31,512 versus $21,658 for females. The per capita income for the city was $17,667. About 3.6% of families and 7.0% of the population were below the poverty line, including 5.3% of those under age 18 and 11.8% of those age 65 or over.

== Arts and culture ==
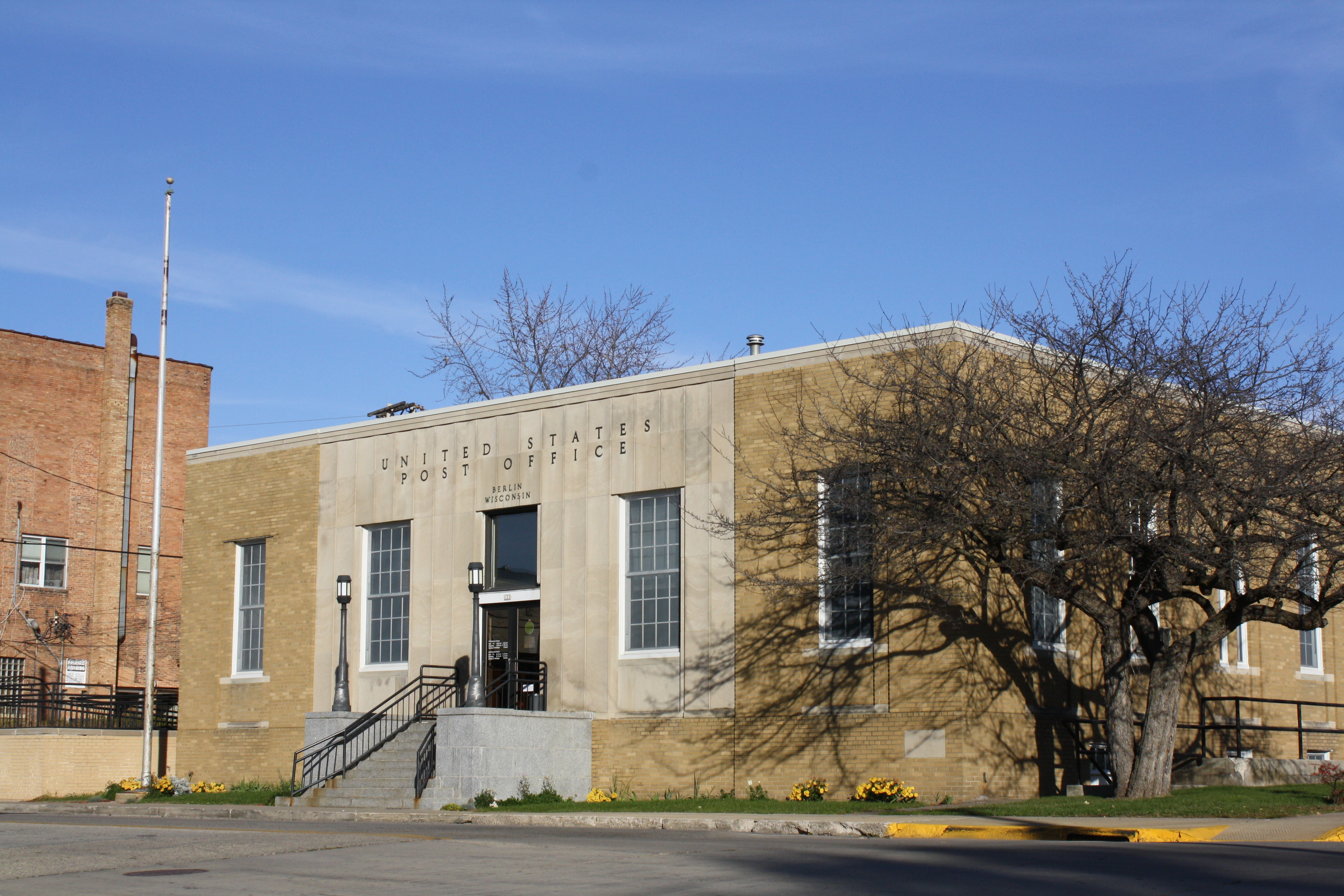
Berlin Post Office

The following sites in Berlin are listed on the National Register of Historic Places:

- Beckwith House Hotel
- Berlin Post Office
- Huron Street Historic District
- Nathan Strong Park Historic District
- Nelson F. Beckwith House
- Old Berlin High School
- Wisconsin Power and Light Berlin Power Plant

== Education ==
Education is administered by the Berlin Area School District. Clay Lamberton Elementary School, Berlin Middle School, and Berlin High School are all located on the same campus in Berlin.

== Media ==
The Berlin Journal is a weekly newspaper published in Berlin. WISS (AM) is a radio station located in Berlin.

== Infrastructure ==
Berlin is served by Wisconsin Highway 49 and Wisconsin Highway 91.

== Notable people ==
- Nelson F. Beckwith – Wisconsin State Assembly
- Fred Blair – candidate for Wisconsin Governor and U.S. Senate
- William A. Bugh - lawyer and Wisconsin State Assembly
- Valentine Detling - Wisconsin State Assembly
- David Evans, Jr. - Wisconsin State Assembly
- George Fitch - Wisconsin State Senator
- Patricia A. Goodrich - Wisconsin State Assembly
- Chris Greisen – NFL player
- Gerald Heaney - magician
- Katherine Davies Jones - botanist
- Andy Jorgensen - Wisconsin State Assembly
- William Nigh - actor and director
- Luther Olsen - Wisconsin State Senator
- Hans H. Olson - Wisconsin State Assembly
- Reuben W. Peterson - Wisconsin State Assembly
- Luther Reed - screenwriter and film director
- Daniel E. Riordan - Wisconsin State Senator
- Hobart Sterling Sacket - Wisconsin State Assembly and Senate
- Fred W. Schlueter - Wisconsin State Assembly
- August E. Smith - Wisconsin State Assembly
- Newcomb Spoor - Wisconsin State Assembly
- George D. Waring - Wisconsin State Senator
- Christian C. Wellensgard - Wisconsin State Assembly
- Dora V. Wheelock (1847–1923) - temperance activist and writer
- Ferdinand T. Yahr - Wisconsin State Senator
