= Berlin Post Office =

- U.S. National Register of Historic Places
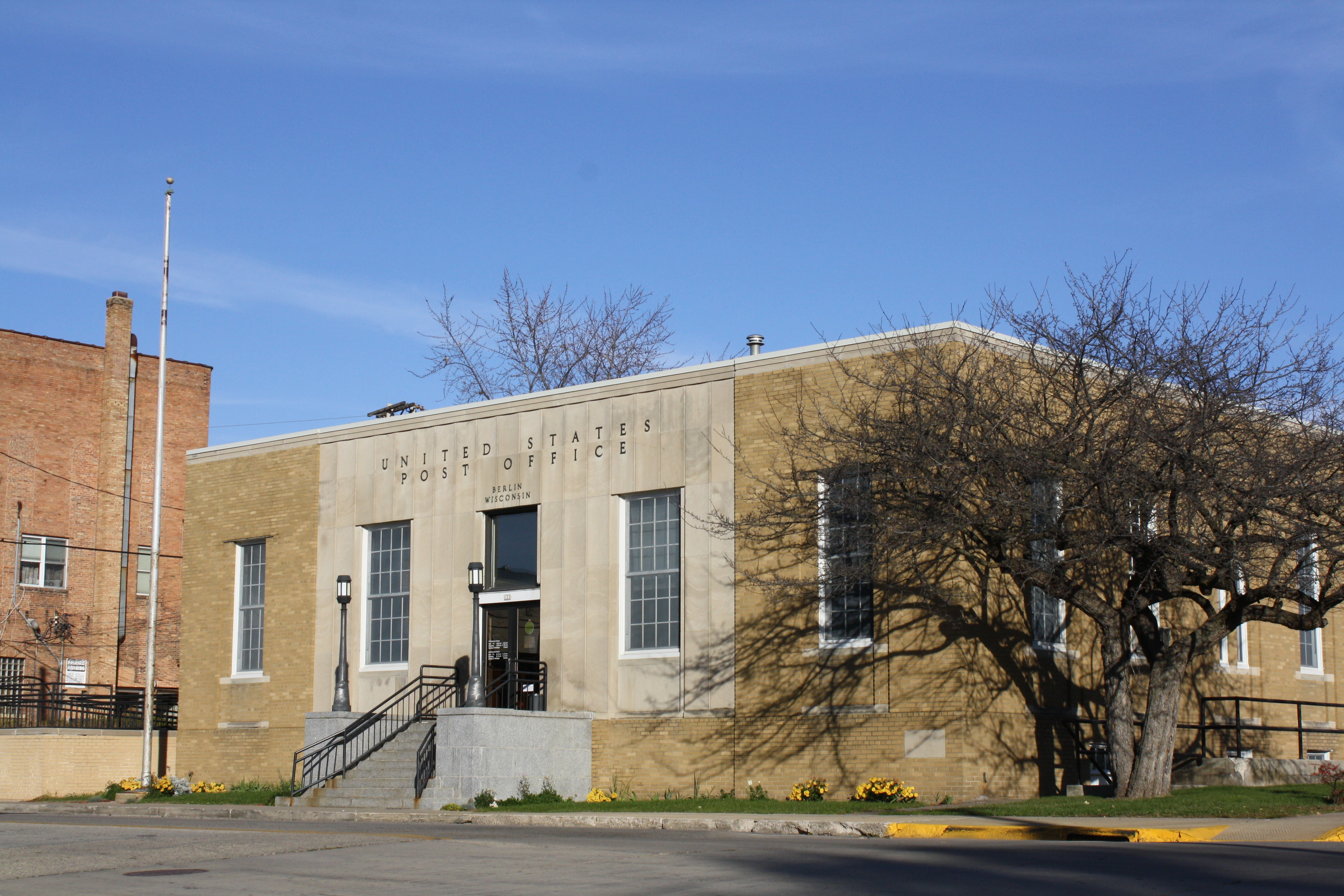
- Berlin Post Office

- Location within Wisconsin Location within the United States
- Location: 122 S. Pearl St., Berlin, Wisconsin
- Coordinates: 43°58′03″N 88°56′51″W
- Area: less than one acre
- Built: 1936–1937
- Architect: Louis A. Simon
- Architectural style: Art Moderne
- MPS: United States Post Office Construction in Wisconsin MPS
- NRHP reference No.: 00001248
- Added to NRHP: October 24, 2000

The Berlin Post Office is located in Berlin, Wisconsin.

It is an Art Moderne-styled post office built in 1936 with help of the PWA, with a mural inside of "Harvesting Cranberries" by Ray Rudell.
