= Beckwith House Hotel =

- U.S. National Register of Historic Places
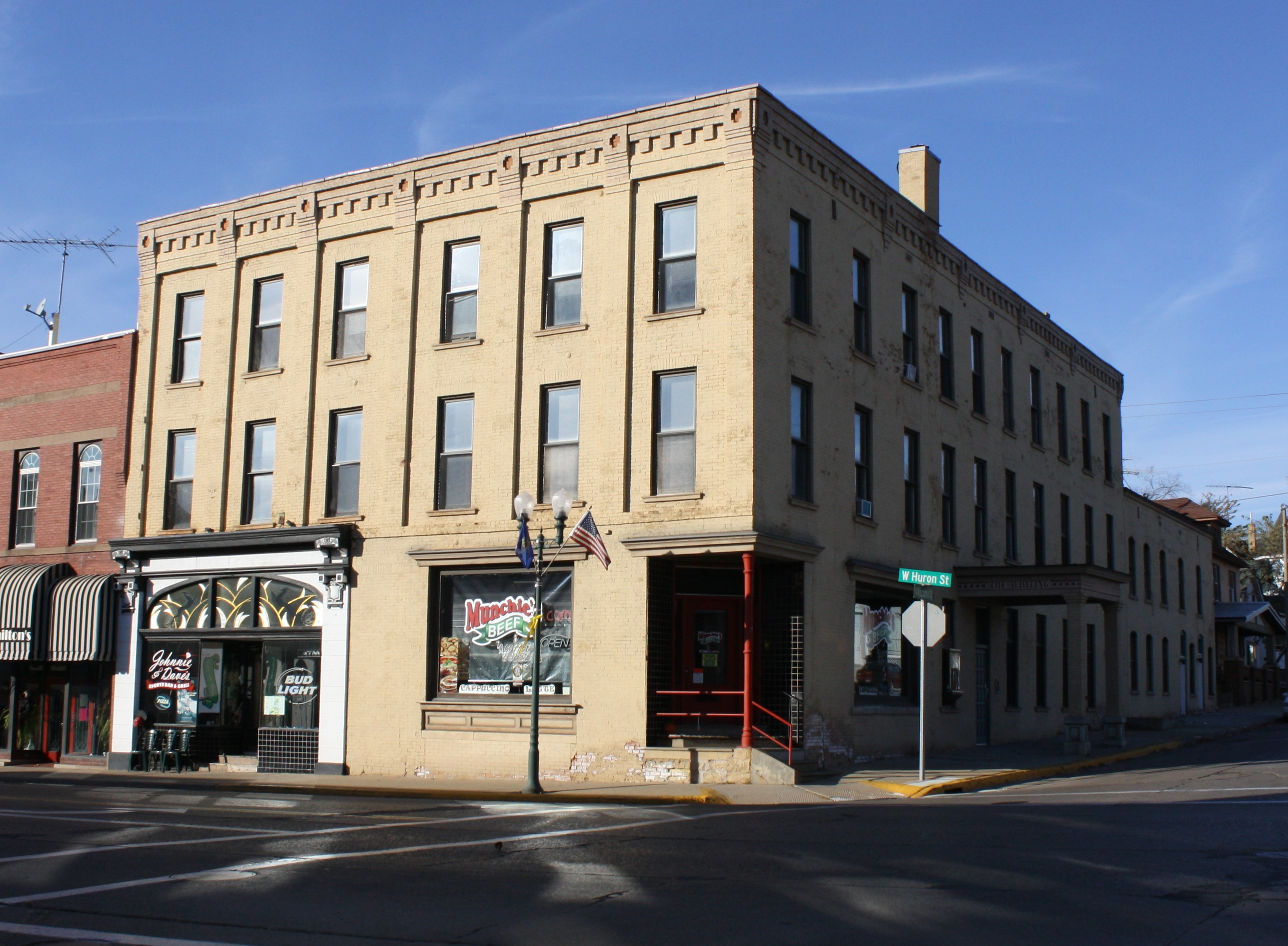

- Location within Wisconsin Location within the United States
- Location: 101 W. Huron St., Berlin, Wisconsin
- Coordinates: 43°58′7″N 88°56′48″W
- Area: less than one acre
- Built: 1863
- Architectural style: Vernacular commercial
- NRHP reference No.: 91001389
- Added to NRHP: September 13, 1991

The Beckwith House Hotel, at 101 W. Huron St. in Berlin, Wisconsin, is a historic hotel built in 1863. It has also been known as Hotel Whiting. It is located on what is now Wisconsin Highway 49. The hotel was built by Nelson F. Beckwith. Beckwith, who also owned the Nelson F. Beckwith House, later became a member of the Wisconsin State Assembly.

It was listed on the National Register of Historic Places in 1991.

It is apparently different from the Beckwith House, a hotel built in Oshkosh in 1876, after the great fire of 1875, replacing a previous hotel built in 1867 and renamed to the Beckwith House in 1873.
