= Marquette, Wisconsin =

- Village
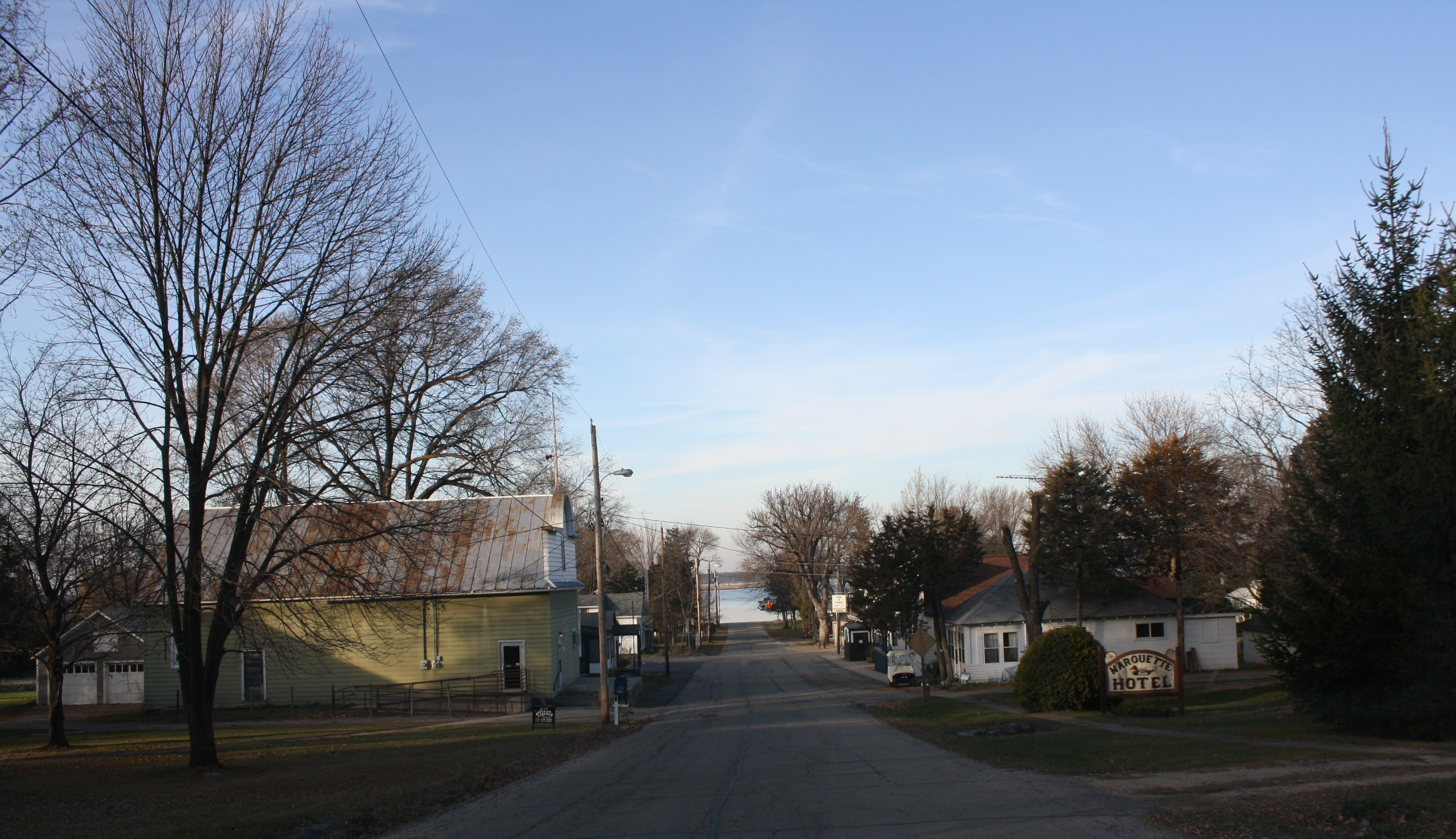
- Downtown Marquette

- Location of Marquette in Green Lake County, Wisconsin.
- Coordinates: 43°44′32″N 89°8′45″W
- Country: United States
- State: Wisconsin
- County: Green Lake

Area
  - Total: 0.37 sq mi (0.97 km^{2})
  - Land: 0.37 sq mi (0.97 km^{2})
  - Water: 0 sq mi (0.00 km^{2})
- Elevation: 797 ft (243 m)

Population (2020)
  - Total: 172
  - Density: 460/sq mi (180/km^{2})
- Time zone: UTC-6 (Central (CST))
  - Summer (DST): UTC-5 (CDT)
- ZIP: 53947
- Area code: 920
- FIPS code: 55-49525
- GNIS feature ID: 1583661
- Website: https://villageofmarquette.gov/

Marquette is a village in Green Lake County, Wisconsin, United States. The population was 172 at the 2020 census. The village is located within the Town of Marquette. Marquette uses the postal code 53947.

== Geography ==
Marquette is located at 43°44′43″N 89°8′25″W (43.745513, -89.140434).

According to the United States Census Bureau, the village has a total area of 0.39 square miles (1.01 km^{2}), all land.

== Demographics ==
Historical population
Census	Pop.	Note	%±
1960	162		—
1970	161		−0.6%
1980	204		26.7%
1990	182		−10.8%
2000	169		−7.1%
2010	150		−11.2%
2020	172		14.7%
U.S. Decennial Census

=== 2010 census ===
As of the census of 2010, there were 150 people, 73 households, and 44 families living in the village. The population density was 384.6 inhabitants per square mile (148.5/km^{2}). There were 169 housing units at an average density of 433.3 per square mile (167.3/km^{2}). The racial makeup of the village was 100.0% White. Hispanic or Latino of any race were 1.3% of the population.

There were 73 households, of which 17.8% had children under the age of 18 living with them, 53.4% were married couples living together, 4.1% had a female householder with no husband present, 2.7% had a male householder with no wife present, and 39.7% were non-families. 34.2% of all households were made up of individuals, and 19.1% had someone living alone who was 65 years of age or older. The average household size was 2.05 and the average family size was 2.64.

The median age in the village was 54.7 years. 14% of residents were under the age of 18; 6.7% were between the ages of 18 and 24; 13.3% were from 25 to 44; 32.6% were from 45 to 64; and 33.3% were 65 years of age or older. The gender makeup of the village was 48.7% male and 51.3% female.

=== 2000 census ===
As of the census of 2000, there were 169 people, 69 households, and 52 families living in the village. The population density was 457.6 people per square mile (176.4/km^{2}). There were 140 housing units at an average density of 379.1 per square mile (146.1/km^{2}). The racial makeup of the village was 98.82% White, 0.59% from other races, and 0.59% from two or more races. 0.59% of the population were Hispanic or Latino of any race.

There were 69 households, out of which 21.7% had children under the age of 18 living with them, 63.8% were married couples living together, 10.1% had a female householder with no husband present, and 23.2% were non-families. 18.8% of all households were made up of individuals, and 10.1% had someone living alone who was 65 years of age or older. The average household size was 2.45 and the average family size was 2.75.

In the village, the population was spread out, with 20.7% under the age of 18, 4.7% from 18 to 24, 20.7% from 25 to 44, 29.0% from 45 to 64, and 24.9% who were 65 years of age or older. The median age was 48 years. For every 100 females, there were 113.9 males. For every 100 females age 18 and over, there were 109.4 males.

The median income for a household in the village was $36,667, and the median income for a family was $35,417. Males had a median income of $34,250 versus $22,250 for females. The per capita income for the village was $17,053. About 3.8% of families and 4.5% of the population were below the poverty line, including none of those under the age of eighteen or sixty five or over.

== Religion ==
St. Paul's Lutheran Church is a Christian church of the Wisconsin Evangelical Lutheran Synod in Marquette.

== Education ==
It is in the Markesan School District.

== Images ==
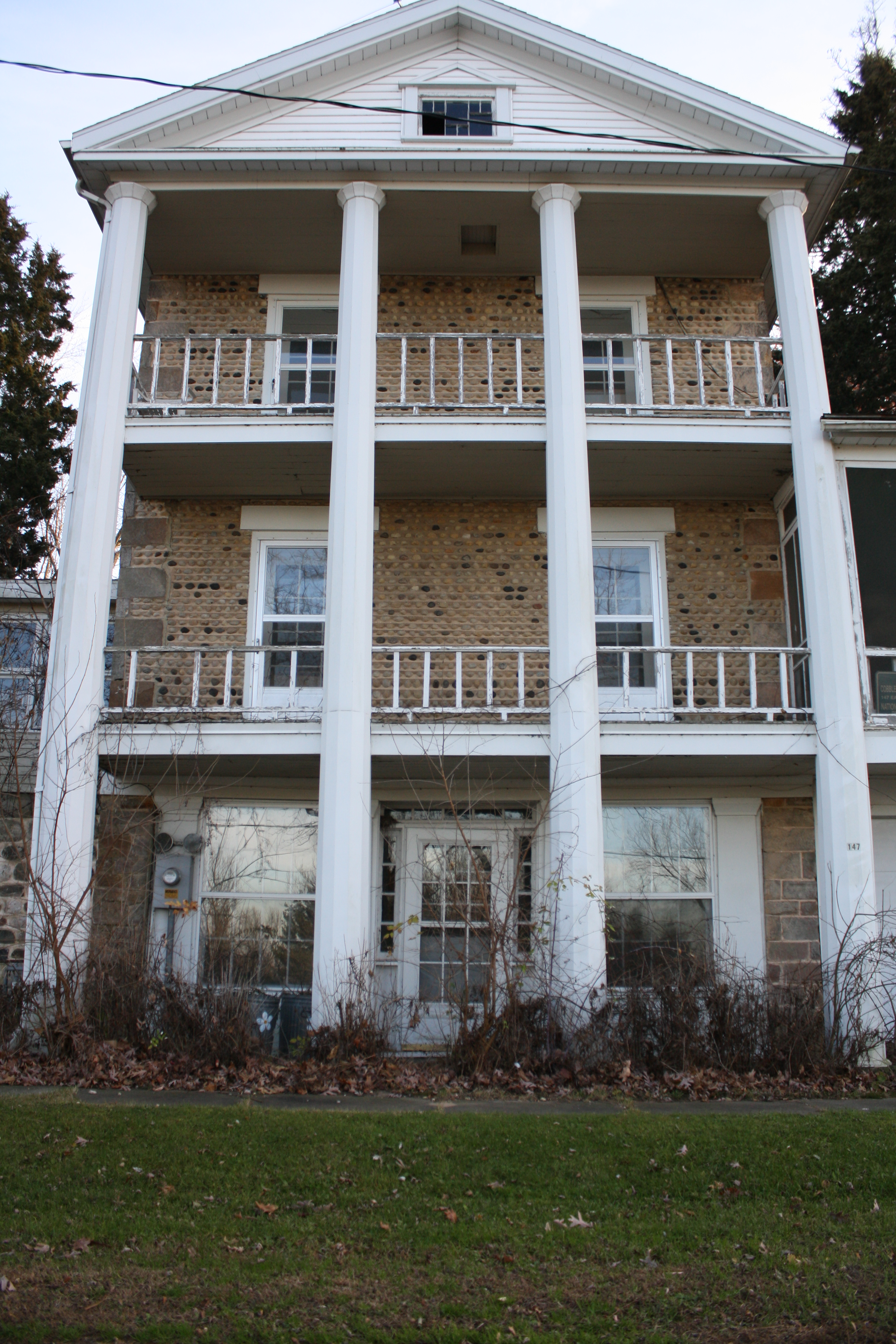
Daniel and Catherine Ketchum Cobblestone House, historic house

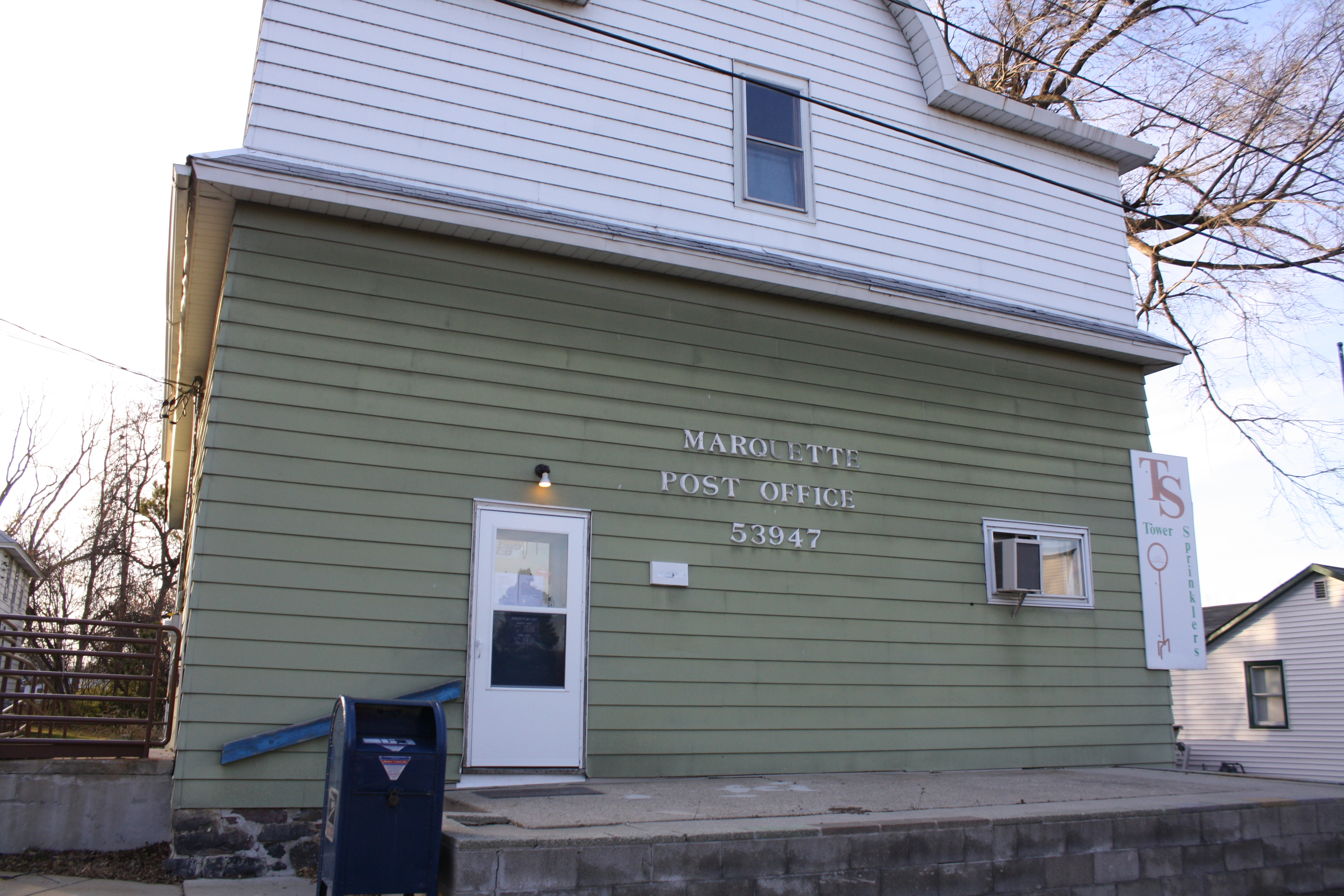
Post office

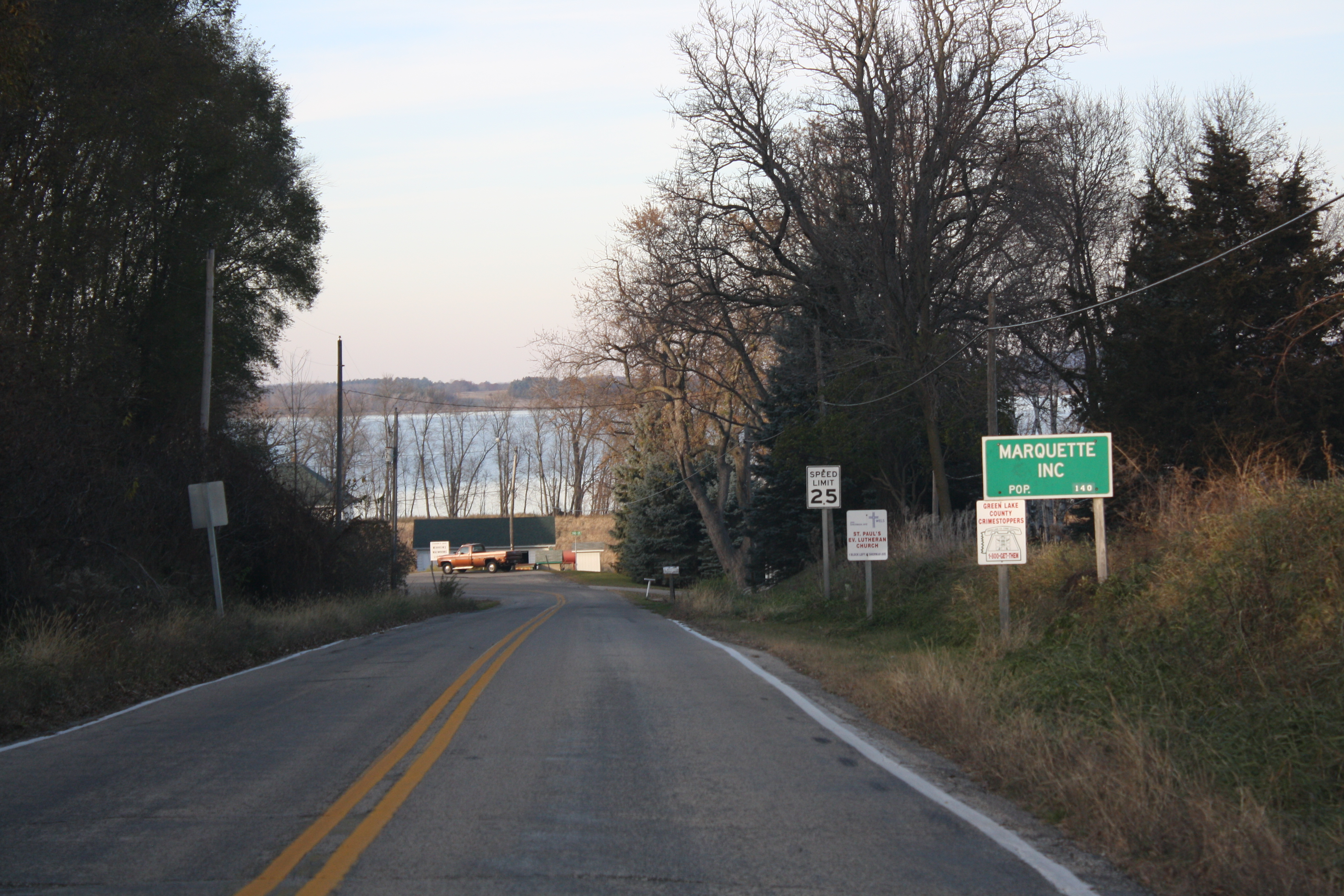
Welcome sign

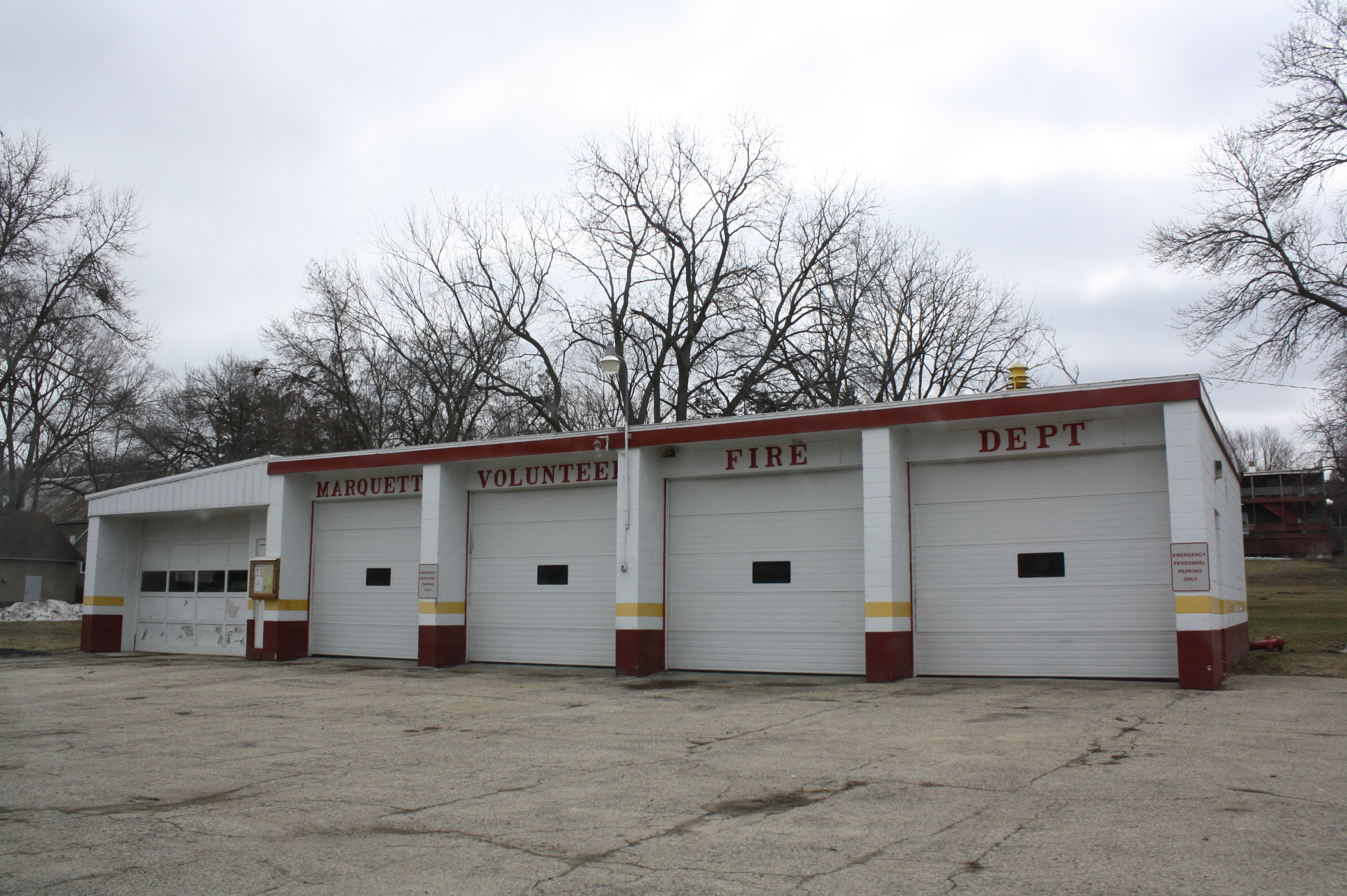
Fire department
