= Catherine Jones (journalist) =

British journalist

Catherine Jones is an English television news journalist, currently working as Health Correspondent for 5 News.

Brought up in Essex, Jones started her professional career in the newsroom of Buckinghamshire-based local radio station Mix 96 in 1994. She then worked for News Direct 97.3FM in London, and presented on the day of the death of Diana, Princess of Wales in 1997. She later worked for Independent Radio News.

Jones joined 5 News in 1999 as a reporter, and became a relief presenter from 2005, mainly on Sundays. She was later promoted to Health Correspondent.

In May 2014, Jones began the role of Health Editor at ITV News, taking over from Lawrence McGinty, who retired as Science and Medical Editor. As well as working on the main news bulletins on ITV, Jones also worked on current affairs programme Tonight and On Assignment.

Jones left the role on ITV News after only four months, returning to her previous position of Health Correspondent on 5 News.
