= Katherine Davies Jones =

American botanist (1860–1943)

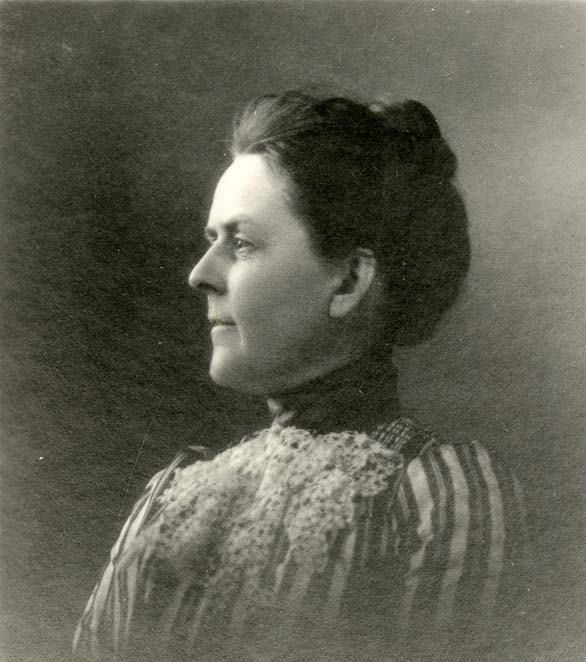
- Born: 1860; Berlin, Wisconsin
- Died: February 15, 1943 (aged 82–83)
- Education: University of Nebraska; UC Berkeley (Ph. B)
- Alma mater: University of California, Berkeley
- Known for: Study of acacia
- Scientific career
- Fields: Botany, landscape gardening and floriculture
- Institutions: University of California, Berkeley
- Thesis: (1896)

Katherine Davies Jones (1860 – February 15, 1943) was an American botanist known for her developments in California horticulture.

== Early life and education ==
Katherine Davies Jones was born in a log cabin in Berlin, Wisconsin, in 1860, the fourth of seven children. From age 16 (1876) to 1880, Katherine taught during the summers and went to school during the winters - attending Salem High School and eventually the University of Nebraska. Jones left the University of Nebraska due to illness in the family. In 1880, Jones along with her family moved from Nebraska to Vallejo, California, where she began teaching at private and public schools.

To continue her education, Katherine enrolled in UC Berkeley in 1893 to study botany and biology, and graduated in 1896 with a Ph.B.

== Career ==
After Jones graduated from UC Berkeley in 1896 she went to work as a teaching aid for botany and zoology classes and kept records for the Botany Department at UC Berkeley. Jones also worked under Mr. A.V. Studbenrauch on Acacia for the Bureau of Plant Industry for the US Department of Agriculture. Acacia became Jones specialty, and in 1914 she wrote the entry on Bailey's Cyclopedia.

In 1913, Katherine was the first person hired by John W. Gregg at the University of California, Berkeley, who directed the Division of Landscape Gardening and Floriculture in the College of Agriculture to teach a course on plant materials as well as field work courses that involved students going outdoors to learn the name of trees and shrubs (Landscape at Berkeley, 4). Jones began the tradition of LA 49, a summer field trip course at UC Berkeley, which continued to be taught long after her retirement in 1930. She was listed in the faculty register as holding the position of Instructure in Landscape Gardening and Floriculture. Jones died on February 15, 1943, and willed her writings to the California Horticultural Society.

Throughout her career Katherine D. Jones regularly contributed to horticultural publications. For a complete list of her published works, see the Published Works section below.

== Published works ==
- Acacia, in L. H. Bailey, Standard Cyclopedia of Horticulture, pp. 178–190. 1914.
- Vines for California, with John W. Gregg and R. T. Stevens in L. H. Bailey, Standard Cyclopedia of Horticulture, pp. 2705–2706. 1916.
- Plant materials for school grounds in California, with R. T. Stevens in J. W. Gregg, The landscape improvement of rural school grounds. Calif. State Board of Education, Bull. no. 20: 1-52. 1917. HathiTrust digital copy
- Review of Genetics in Relation to Agriculture by E. B. Babcock and R. E. Clausen. Jour. International Garden Club 2: 608. 1918.
- Berried shrubs. Bull. Garden Club of Alameda County. 1921. HathiTrust digital copy
- Color list of border plants, in Stephen Child, Landscape architecture, a series of letters. Stanford University Press, California. 1927.
- Acacias in California. National Horticultural Magazine 12: 1-44. 1933.
- Strelitzia Reginae. Golden Gardens 2(11) : 1–2. 1934.
- Deciduous shrubs for the San Joaquin Valley. Golden Gardens 2(12) : 3. 1934.
- Plants for the San Joaquin Valley. II. Evergreen shrubs. Golden Gardens 3(2): 3–4. 1934.
- Plants for the San Joaquin Valley. III. Drought tolerant shrubs. IV. Drought tolerant herbaceous plants. Golden Gardens 3(4): 2. 1935.
- Plants for the San Joaquin Valley. V. Shrubs for ground covers. Golden Gardens 3(7): 2. 1935.
- The gay Abutilon. Golden Gardens 3(3): 1-2. 1934.
- Plants of New Zealand grown in California. National Horticultural Magazine 14: 1-58. 1935.
- Thirty important vines for California. National Horticultural Magazine 15: I- 65. 1936.
- Acacia retinodes — water wattle. Golden Gardens 4(11): 3. 1936.
- Thirty more climbers for California. National Horticultural Magazine 16: 1-57. 1937.
- Thirty more climbers for California. National Horticultural Magazine 17: 13-58. 1938.
- A study of climbers. I-X. Golden Gardens. 6(8): 1, 1938; 6(9): 2, 1938; 6(10): 5, 8, 1938; 6(11): 4, 8, 1938; 7(1): 7, 1938; 7(2): 4, 14, 1938; 7(3):II- 12, 1938; 7(4): 7–8, 1939; 7(5): 11–12, 1939; 7(9): 8–9, 1939.

== Honors and awards ==
Jones received honors from both the California Horticultural Society and California Garden Clubs after her retirement in 1930.

== Katherine D. Jones Collection ==
The Katherine D. Jones collection consists primarily of materials Jones used for her teaching and research. It includes correspondence, field notes, course materials, lists of plants, papers on botanical subjects by Jones and others (including Harry Shepherd), pamphlets on flowers and vines, and articles on plant ecology. The bulk of the collection consists of notebooks centered on garden subjects, field trips, site visits, and plant research. Subjects include files on English gardens and U.S. colonial gardens, Golden Gate Park, the Panama Pacific International Exposition (1915), the Golden Gate International Exposition (1939), and the Blake/Symmes Garden in Kensington CA. The collection also includes photographs, plant cards, and extensive research files on vines.
