= Huron Street Historic District =

Historic district in Wisconsin, United States

- U.S. National Register of Historic Places
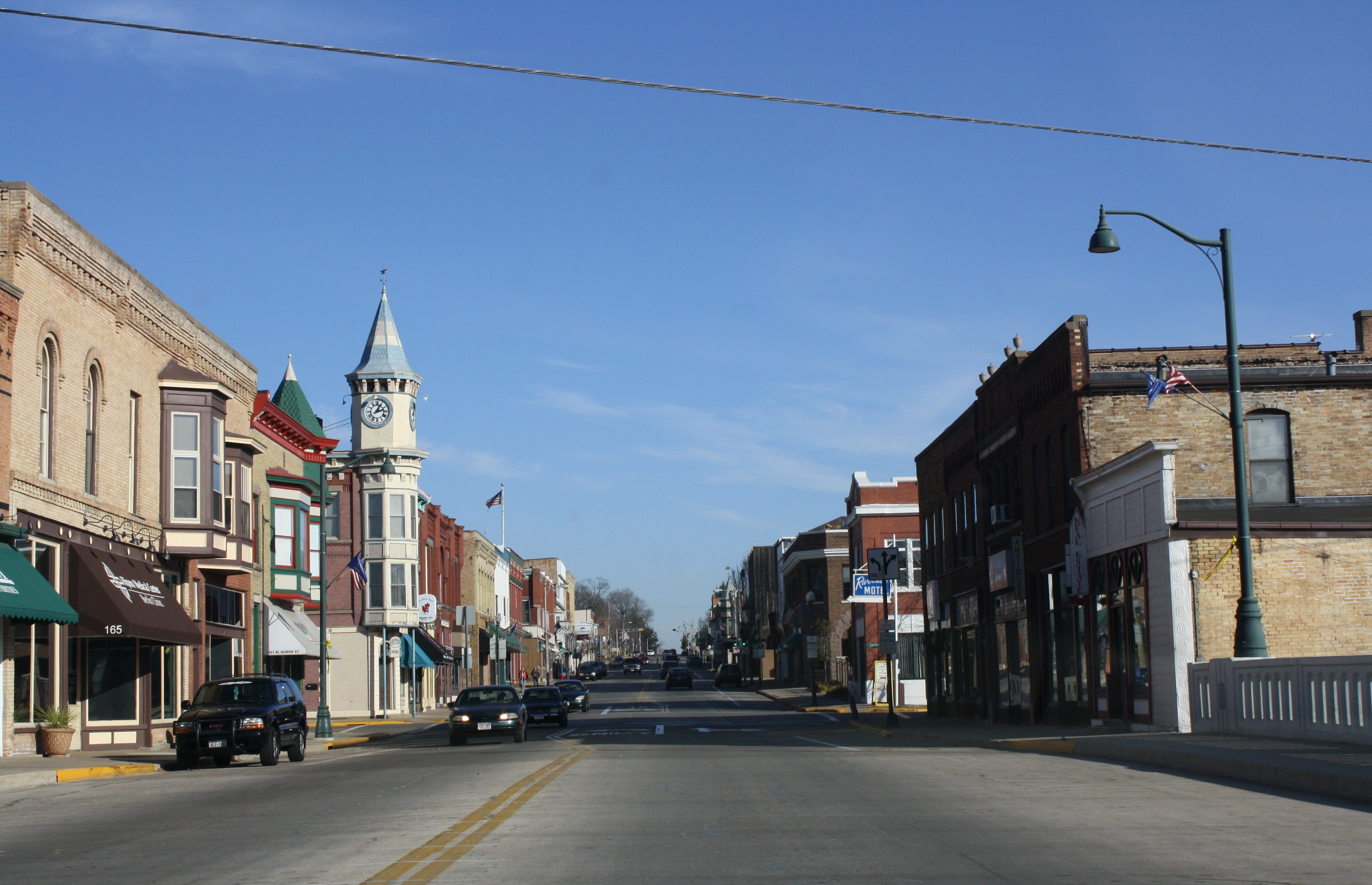
- A portion of the district.
- Location: Roughly, Huron St. from Fox R. to 124 E. Huron, including adjacent side streets, Berlin, Wisconsin
- Area: 5 acres (2.0 ha)
- NRHP reference No.: 92001140
- Added to NRHP: August 31, 1992

The Huron Street Historic District is located in Berlin, Wisconsin.

== Description ==
The district is made up of Berlin's commercial downtown, reconstructed with brick after the fires of the 1860s and 1870. Notable buildings include the 1864 Beckwith House Hotel, the 1889 Romanesque Revival Masonic Temple, the 1890 Kitowski Tailor Shop, the 1893 Styer cigar factory/store, the 1895 Queen Anne Engelbracht Block, the 1897 Classical Revival First National Bank, the 1912 Classical Revival Nigbor Block, and the 1928 Art Deco City Hall. It was added to the State and the National Register of Historic Places in 1992.
