= Old Berlin High School =

- Berlin High School
- U.S. National Register of Historic Places
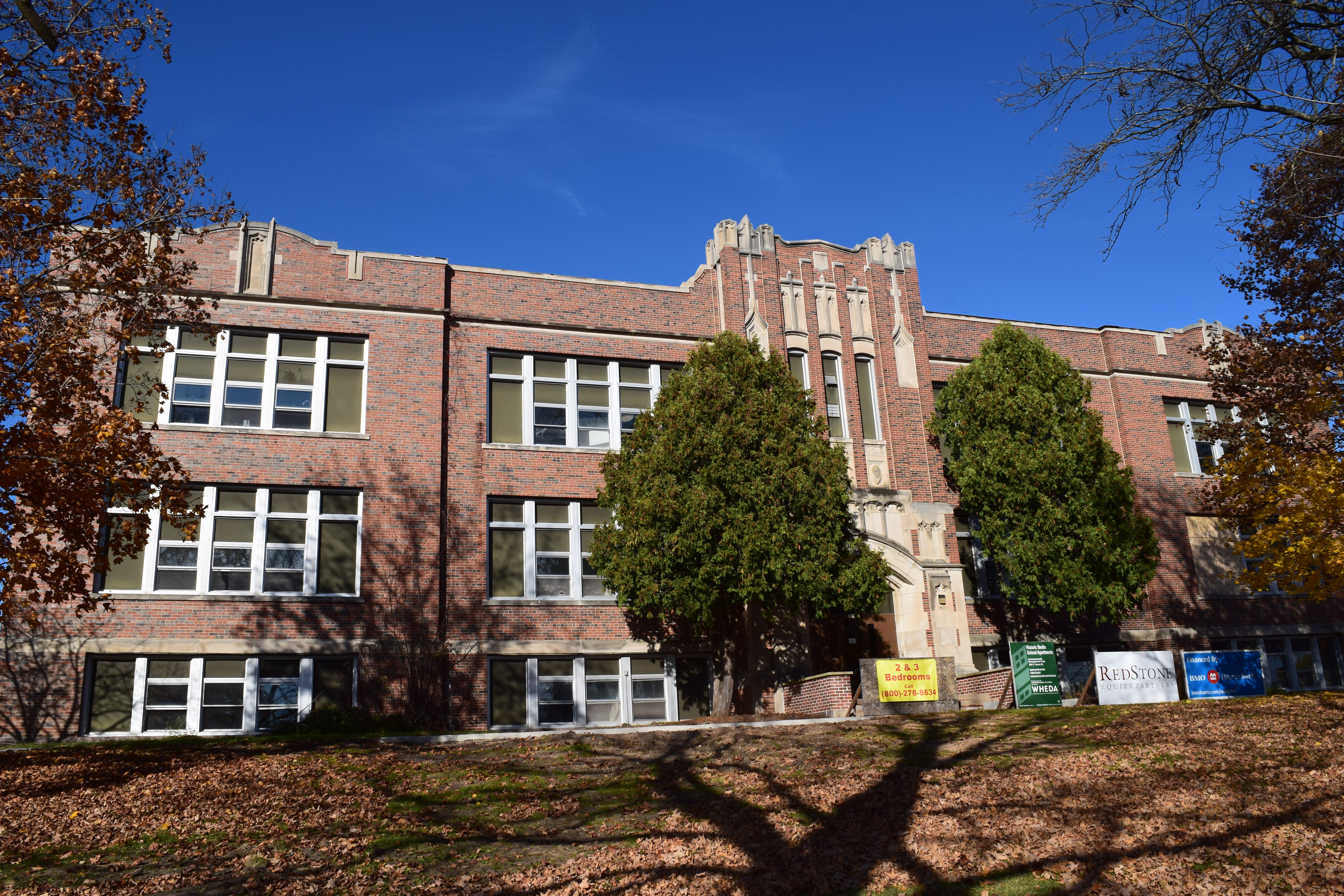
- Berlin High School
- Location: 289 E. Huron St. Berlin, Wisconsin
- Built: 1918/1947/1955/1986
- Architect: Parkinson & Dockendorff/Robert W. Surplice
- Architectural style: Collegiate Gothic/Tudor Revival
- NRHP reference No.: 16000465
- Added to NRHP: July 18, 2016

The former Berlin High School building is located in Berlin, Wisconsin.

== History ==
The school opened in 1918 with a ceremony that included remarks by Governor Emanuel L. Philipp and Mayor C. W. Hitchcock. It served as a high school until 1996, at which time the new Berlin High School was opened.

The building served as a middle school for a time and has since been converted into apartments. It was added to the National Register of Historic Places in 2016.
