= Warhol (disambiguation) =

Andy Warhol (1928–1987) was an American artist, film director, and producer.

Warhol may also refer to:

- Warhol (book), a 2020 biography of Andy Warhol written by Blake Gopnik
- Warhol (crater), a crater on Mercury
- Warhol (unit), a humorous unit of measurement of fame or hype
- Robyn R. Warhol (born 1955), American literary scholar and originator of feminist narrative theory
- Pockets Warhol (1992–2026), a Canadian capuchin monkey named after Andy Warhol
- Warhol, a musical alias of Canadian-American hip hop artist Noah23
- "Warhol", a song by Linea 77 from the 2003 album Numb
- "Warhol", a song by Palaye Royale from the 2016 album Boom Boom Room (Side A)
- "Warhol", a song by Lisa Mitchell from the 2016 album Warriors

== See also ==
- Andy Warhol (disambiguation)
- Warhola
