= Congo (chimpanzee) =

Chimpanzee artist (1954–1964)

- Species: Chimpanzee (Pan troglodytes)
- Sex: Male
- Born: c. 1954
- Died: 1964 (aged 9–10); London Zoo, London, England
- Cause of death: Tuberculosis
- Years active: 1956-1959
- Known for: Learning to draw and paint

Congo (1954–1964) was a chimpanzee artist and painter. Zoologist, author and surrealist painter Desmond Morris first observed his abilities when the chimpanzee was offered a pencil and paper at two years of age. By the age of four, Congo had made 400 drawings and paintings. His style has been described as "lyrical abstract impressionism".

== Biography and works ==
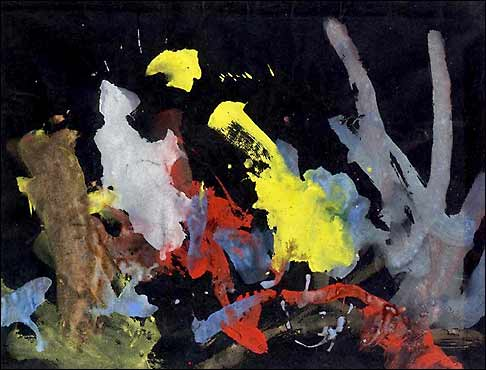
Painting art by Congo from 1957

Congo was born in the wild in 1954. He learned to draw near the age of two, beginning when zoologist Desmond Morris offered Congo a pencil. Morris said, "He took a pencil and I placed a piece of card in front of him. This is how I recorded it at the time, 'Something strange was coming out of the end of the pencil. It was Congo's first line. It wandered a short way and then stopped. Would it happen again? Yes, it did, and again and again." Morris soon observed that the chimpanzee would draw circles, and had a basic sense of composition in his drawings. He also showed the ability of symmetrical consistency between two sides of a sketch; when Morris drew a shape at one side of a piece of paper, Congo would balance the structure by making marks on the other half of the paper. Similarly, if a color on one side contained blue for example, he would add blue to the other side as well to keep balance.

He soon began painting; the patterns he made were never distinguished, pictorial images, but usually of a vague "radiating fan pattern" in the abstract impressionism style. Between the ages of two and four, he produced about 400 drawings and paintings.

Through that time, Congo developed a familiarity with his routine painting sessions with Morris. When a picture was taken away that he didn't consider complete, Congo would reportedly begin to scream and "throw fits". Also, if the ape considered one of his drawings to be finished, he would refuse to continue painting even if someone tried to persuade him to do so.

In the late 1950s, he made appearances on the British television show Zootime, which was presented live from the London Zoo by Desmond Morris. He died at ten years of age in 1964 of tuberculosis.

== Reception ==
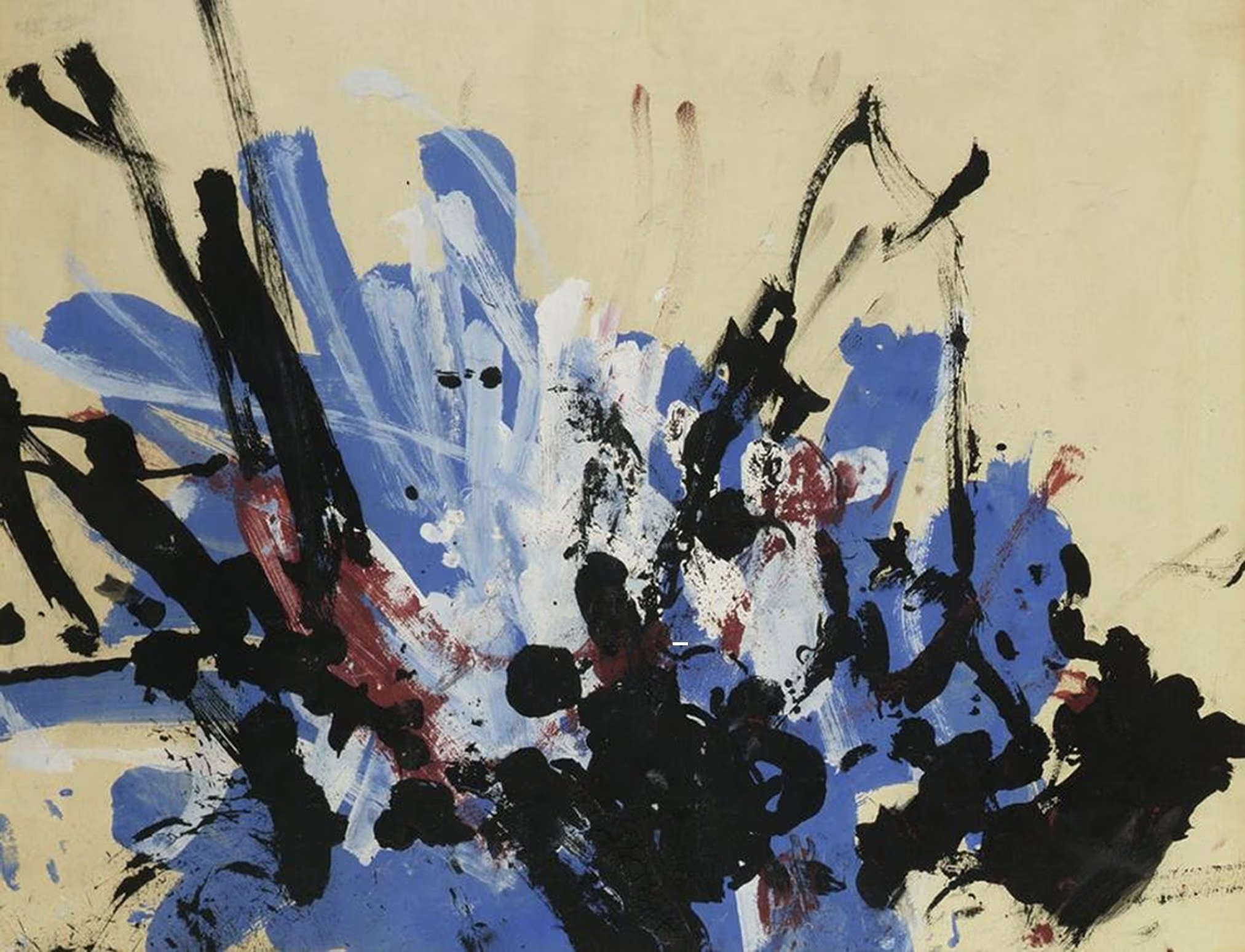
A painting by Congo

Media reaction to Congo's painting abilities were mixed, although relatively positive and accepted with interest. Spanish painter Pablo Picasso was reportedly a "fan" of his paintings, and hung one of the ape's pictures on his studio wall after receiving it as a gift.

On June 20, 2005, Congo's paintings were included in an auction at Bonhams alongside works by Renoir and Warhol—they sold for more than expected, while Renoir's and Warhol's did not sell. American collector Howard Hong purchased three of Congo's works for over US$25,000.

== See also ==
- Animal-made art
- Pierre Brassau
- Pockets Warhol (capuchin monkey)
- Tillamook Cheddar (dog)
- List of individual apes
