= Jumoke =

Zoo-born western lowland gorilla

- Species: Western lowland gorilla (Gorilla gorilla gorilla)
- Sex: Female
- Born: November 10th, 1989; Columbus Zoo and Aquarium, Powell, Ohio
- Died: August 18th, 2008; Columbus Zoo and Aquarium, Powell, Ohio
- Cause of death: Miscarriage complications
- Residence: Columbus Zoo and Aquarium in Powell, Ohio
- Parent: Toni (mother)

Jumoke (November 10, 1989 – August 18, 2008) was a western lowland gorilla at the Columbus Zoo and Aquarium in Powell, Ohio.

== Life ==
Jumoke was born on November 10, 1989, at the Columbus Zoo and Aquarium. She was the daughter of Toni and granddaughter of Colo, the first gorilla born in captivity. Jumoke was hand-reared until she was 18 months old. While being raised, the keepers would snap their fingers as they came towards the room to make sure she was not startled. She learned from observation how to snap her fingers and smile, and would often do these things when bored or towards people. Because she was hand raised she had a hard time raising her own offspring and required the assistance of surrogates. Jumoke however did save the life of her son Jontu who was not breathing at birth. She put Jontu's head to her mouth and started breathing for him.

Jumoke died unexpectedly on August 18, 2008. The cause of death is believed to be complications from an earlier miscarriage.

== See also ==
- List of individual apes
