= Tonda (orangutan) =

Individual orangutan

- Tonda with T.K.
- Species: orangutan
- Sex: female
- Born: 1958
- Died: March 23, 2009 (aged 50–51); Panama City Beach, Florida
- Known for: animal odd couple

Tonda (1958 – 23 March 2009) was the oldest orangutan in the United States. Tonda died on March 23, 2009, at ZooWorld in Panama City Beach, Florida, aged 50.

== Biography ==
Tonda, short for Tondaleyo, died in her sleep at the age of 50. Tonda was the oldest registered orangutan in captivity in the United States.

== Cultural references ==
Tonda, along with a male kitten named T.K., had earned a modicum of fame after being named the second-best animal odd couple by Animal Planet. The pair were also the subject of a book, Tonda and TK: Friends.

== See also ==
- List of individual apes
- Orangutans in popular culture
- Oldest apes
