= List of individual apes =

List of notable non-human apes

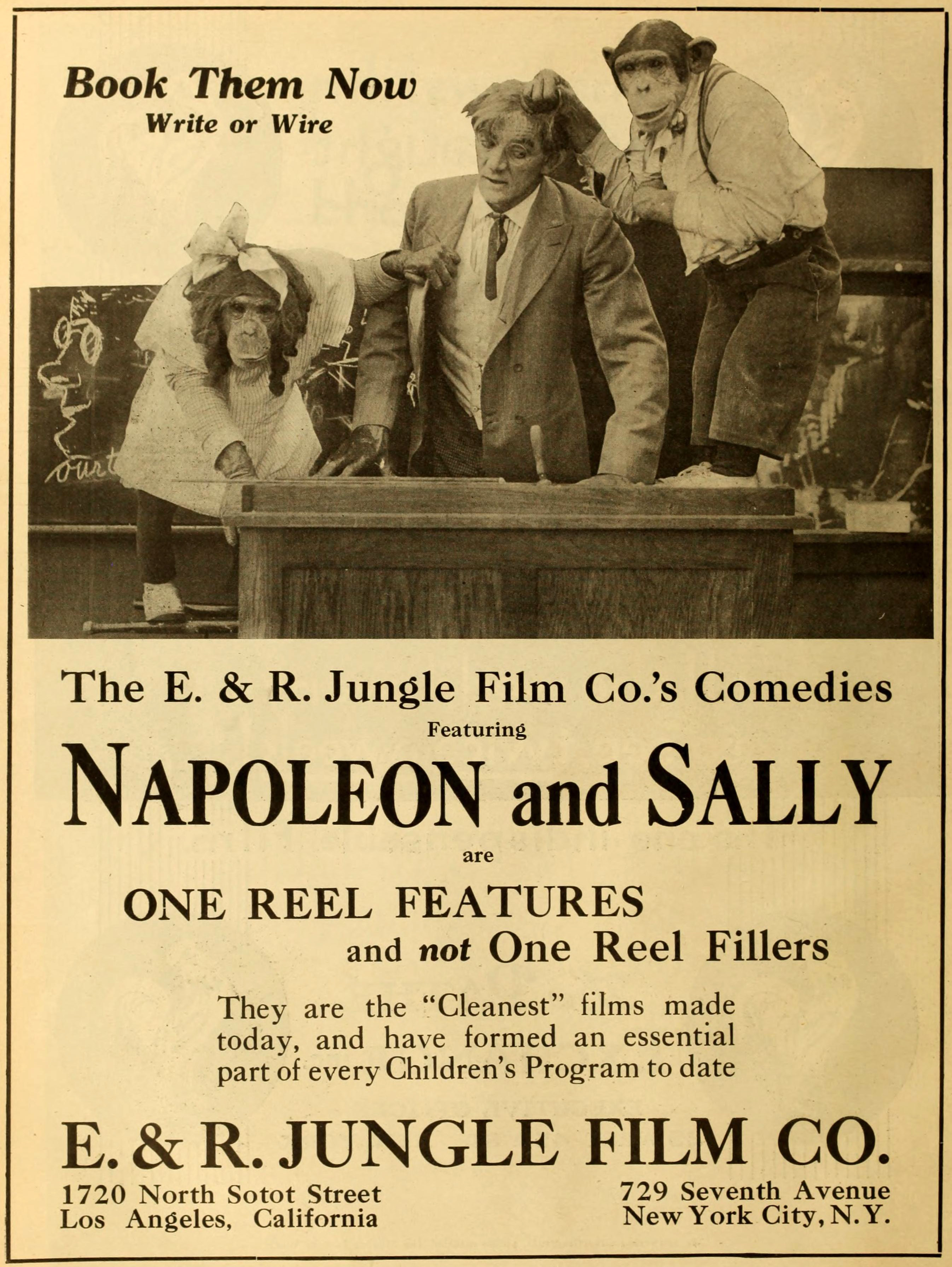
Napoleon and Sally, 1916 film

This is a list of non-human apes of encyclopedic interest. It includes individual hominoids that are in some way famous or notable.

== Actors ==
- J. Fred Muggs (born 1952), a chimpanzee, was a "co-host" with Dave Garroway on NBC's Today Show in the 1950s.
- Jiggs (c. 1929–1938), a chimpanzee, was the first Cheeta in the Tarzan films in the 1930s.
- Jimmy (c. 1952–1968), a chimpanzee, appeared in the 1956 film Dark Venture alongside his owner, John Calvert. In later life, Jimmy became a popular zoo attraction, first at Taronga Park Zoo (Sydney, Australia) and then at Perth Zoo (Western Australia).
- Joe Martin (active 1914–1931), an orangutan, appeared in several silent-era American films.
- Pankun (パン君, born October 1, 2001), a chimpanzee, was featured in the Japanese TV shows Tensai! Shimura Dobutsu-en (Genius! Shimura Zoo) and the TBS program Dobutsu Kiso Tengai! (Unbelievable Animals!).
- Peter (active 1907–1910), a chimpanzee vaudeville performer who was studied by Lightner Witmer.
- Sam (1989–2010), an orangutan, played Dunston in the 1996 movie comedy Dunston Checks In; he was trained by Larry Madrid.
- Strawberry, an orangutan, appeared as a pet ape temporarily cared for by Mr. Edwards, (Victor French) in Little House on the Prairie season 9:Ep 20, "For The Love of Blanche".
- Tonka, a chimpanzee, was the subject of the 2024 HBO documentary series Chimp Crazy. Tonka appeared in the films Buddy (1997), George of the Jungle (1997), and Babe: Pig in the City (1998).
- Travis (1995–2009), a chimpanzee, gained fame for starring in commercials for Old Navy and Coca-Cola in the 2000s. He was shot dead by police to stop his attack on a 55-year-old woman named Charla Nash in Stamford, Connecticut. Nash survived, but was left blind, disfigured, and missing nine of her fingers.

== Artists ==
- Congo (1954–1964), a chimpanzee, abstract impressionist painter of the late 1950s.
- Peter, alias Pierre Brassau, a chimpanzee, was the subject of a famous hoax through which the chimpanzee's paintings were presented as the avant-garde works of unknown French (human) artist "Pierre Brassau".

== Science and exploration ==
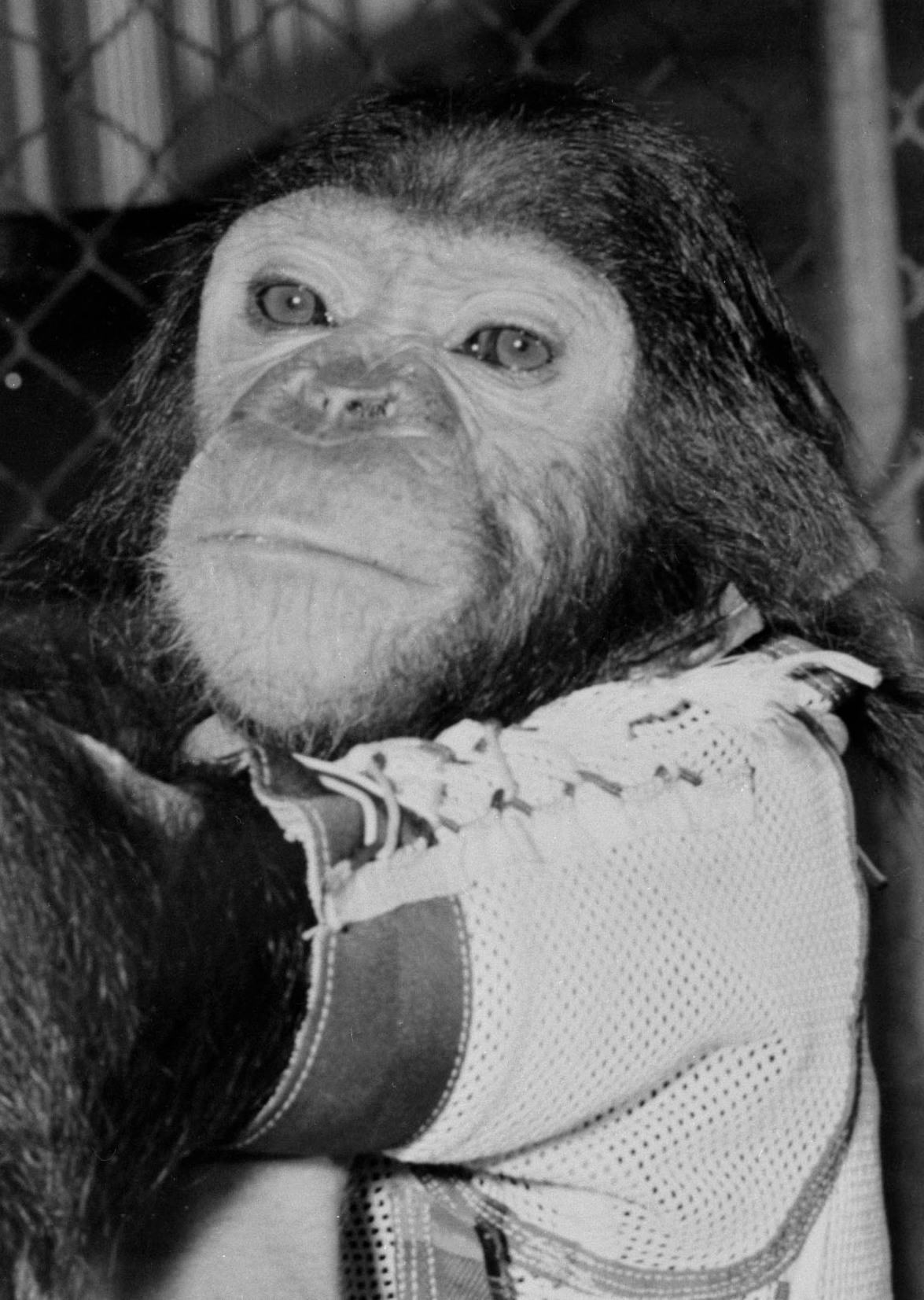
Enos, the only chimpanzee and third primate to orbit the Earth, flew on NASA's Mercury-Atlas 5 Project Mercury space mission on November 29, 1961.

- Abang (born 1966)—orangutan, taught to use and make a stone tool (cutting flake)
- Ai (1976-2026)—chimpanzee, studied by scientists at Primate Research Institute, Kyoto University
- Ayumu (born 2000)—chimpanzee, studied by scientists at Primate Research Institute, Kyoto University
- Bonnie—orangutan, began whistling (mimicking an animal caretaker), which is changing ideas about primate sound repertoires
- Chantek (1977–2017)—orangutan, involved with language research and ApeNet language-using great ape ambassador
- Enos (died 1962)—chimpanzee, 1961 NASA Project Mercury orbiter, the only chimpanzee and the third primate to orbit the Earth
- Flo (died 1972)—chimpanzee, key member of the Kasakela Chimpanzee Community studied by Jane Goodall; received an obituary in the Sunday Times
- Frodo (1976–2013)—chimpanzee, baby-eating "bully", attacked Jane Goodall and Gary Larson
- Gua—chimpanzee; raised as a child by the Drs. Kellogg alongside their son Donald
- Ham (1956–1983)—chimpanzee; the first great ape to successfully travel to space, Ham's 1961 NASA Project Mercury suborbital flight occurred 11 months before Enos' orbital mission.
- Jenny—orangutan, encountered and described by Charles Darwin in March 1838 at London Zoo.
- Kanzi (1980-2025)—bonobo, involved with language research and tool invention, ApeNet language-using great ape ambassador
- Koko (1971–2018)—gorilla, involved with sign language research and ApeNet language-using great ape ambassador
- Lana—chimpanzee, reared at Yerkes National Primate Research Center as part of its language analogue project
- Loulis—chimpanzee, involved in ape hand-signing research
- Lucy—chimpanzee, cross-fostered and raised by University of Oklahoma psychotherapist
- Michael (1973–2000), a silverback gorilla involved in sign language research along with Koko
- Moja (1972-2002)—chimpanzee, involved in ape hand-signing research
- Nim Chimpsky (1973–2000)—chimpanzee, named after linguist Noam Chomsky
- Nyota (born 1998)—bonobo, Panbanisha's son
- Oliver (1957–2012)—chimpanzee, the so-called "Missing Link", apparent "humanzee"
- Panbanisha—bonobo at the same research center as Kanzi
- Panpanzee (1985–2014)—chimpanzee at the same research center as Kanzi
- Poco (1981)—chimpanzee researched by Robin Crompton whose early confinement resulted in human-like bipedality
- Sarah (1959–2019)—research chimpanzee whose cognitive skills are documented in The Mind of an Ape
- Sultan—chimpanzee, used in classic Kohler tool-use studies
- Titus (1974–2009)—gorilla, an extensively observed silverback mountain gorilla
- Viki—chimpanzee, one of the first apes used in ape language experiments
- Washoe (1965–2007)—chimpanzee, pioneer ape of hand-signing research

== Zoo-kept ==
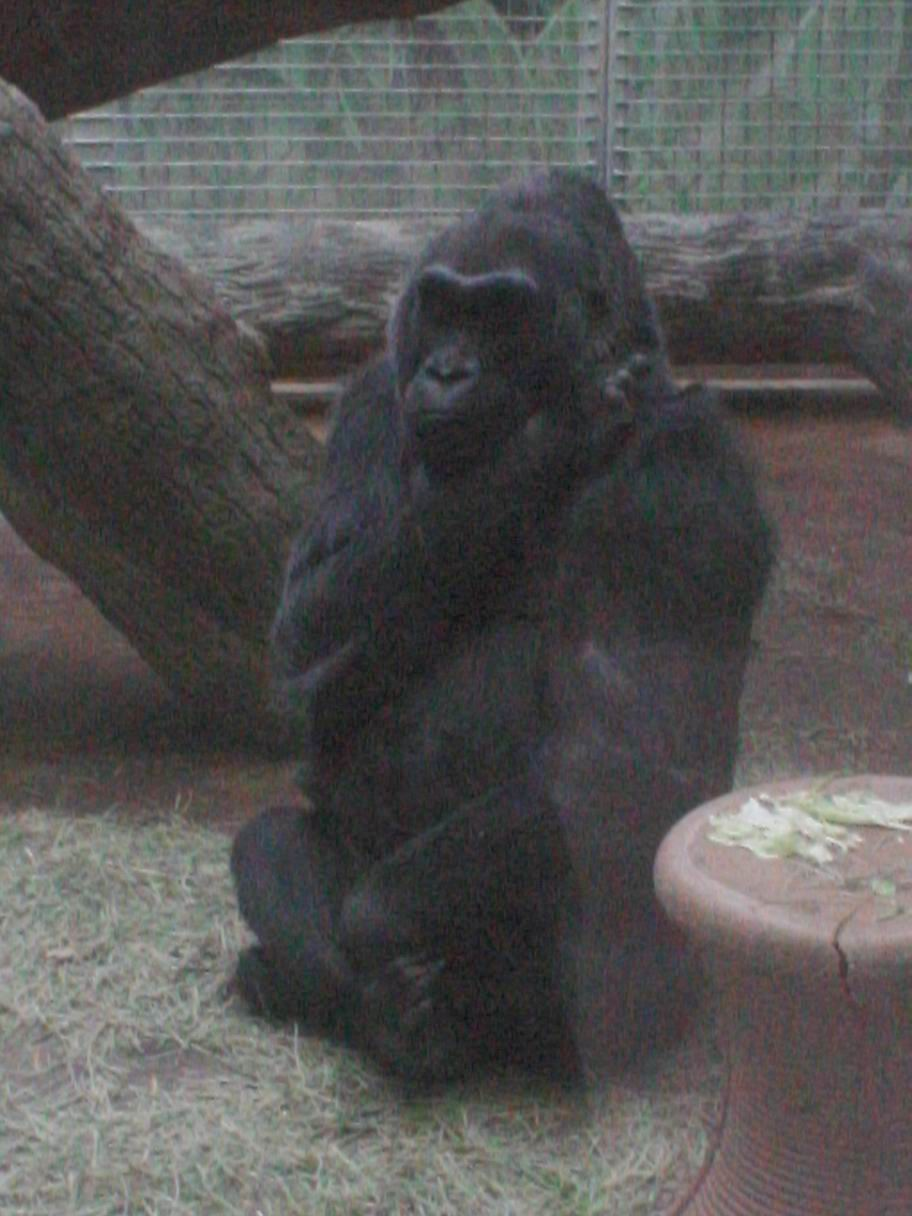
Colo was both the first gorilla born in captivity and the oldest gorilla in captivity, and lived her entire life at the Columbus Zoo.

- Ah Meng (1960–2008) was a female Sumatran orangutan and a tourism icon of Singapore.
- Alfred the Gorilla (1928–1948) lived in Bristol Zoo.
- Ambam (1990–2022) lived in Port Lympne Wild Animal Park
- Azalea, a chimpanzee living at the Korea Central Zoo known for her ability to smoke cigarettes
- Bill (1946–2007), a long-lived chimpanzee, resided at Sequoia Park Zoo in Eureka, California, for 50 years.
- Binti Jua, a gorilla living in Brookfield Zoo, saved a boy in 1996.
- Bobo (1951–1968), a western lowland gorilla, lived in the Lowman family home in Anacortes, Washington, from his infancy until 1953, and then Woodland Park Zoo in Seattle until his death.
- Bokito (1996–2023), a silverback gorilla, escaped from the Blijdorp Zoo on 18 May 2007 and injured a woman.
- Bushman, of Chicago's Lincoln Park Zoo, was the most famous zoo gorilla in the U.S. at the time of his death in 1951. He was known for his geniality and considered by Time as "the best known and most popular figure in Chicago" in 1950. While alive, he brought over 100 million visitors to the zoo; his taxidermic remains could be seen at Chicago's Field Museum of Natural History.
- Charles (1972–2024), a wild-born silverback western lowland gorilla, renowned for his artwork, since 1974. Resided at the Toronto Zoo.
- Colo (1956–2017) was both the first gorilla born in captivity and, living to be 60, the oldest gorilla in captivity. She was born in the Columbus Zoo and lived there her entire life.
- Gregoire (1942-2008), Africa's oldest known chimpanzee, who spent more than 40 years in a cage at the Brazzaville Zoo.
- Gust (gorilla) (1952–1988) was a Congolese gorilla that became an icon of the Antwerp Zoo
- Guy the Gorilla (1946–1978) was a famous gorilla in London Zoo.
- Harambe (1999–2016) was a gorilla shot dead by the Cincinnati Zoo after a child fell into his enclosure. This would eventually lead to the deceased ape becoming a popular Internet meme.
- Ivan (1962–2012) was a western lowland gorilla who lived in a shopping mall in Tacoma, Washington, who was also the inspiration for the 2012 book The One and Only Ivan, which was then drafted into a 2020 film of the same name.
- Jambo (1961–1992), a gorilla, cared for a boy who fell into his enclosure.
- Jenny (1953–2008), a western lowland gorilla, lived at the Dallas Zoo from 1957 until her death, and was the oldest gorilla in captivity at the time of her death.
- Jo Mendi II (1939–1980), a chimpanzee at the Detroit Zoo who became known as "the greatest performing chimp of all time."
- Julius (born 1979), a chimpanzee at Kristiansand Zoo and Amusement Park known for living his childhood with a human family.
- Jumoke (1989–2008)—western lowland gorilla and the granddaughter of Colo
- Karen (born 1992), a Sumatran orangutan, who was the first zoo animal to have open heart surgery at the San Diego Zoo in 1994.
- Karta (1982-2017), a Sumatran orangutan at the Adelaide Zoo first at the San Diego Zoo
- Ken Allen (1971–2000)—Bornean orangutan at the San Diego Zoo known for his escape artistry
- Little Mama (1938–2017) — chimpanzee, and believed to be the oldest chimpanzee on record
- Louis, a male western lowland gorilla known for walking upright in order to avoid muddying his hands. Currently resides at Zoo de Granby in Granby, Quebec.
- Massa (1930–1984) — silverback, one of the longest-lived gorillas ever recorded, and second-longest-lived male in captivity, died at age 54
- Max (1971–2004) — gorilla in the Johannesburg Zoo, famously apprehended a criminal in 1997, getting shot twice in the process
- Mumba (1960-2008), a Western lowland gorilla at the Granby Zoo in Granby, Quebec.
- Ndume, a male western lowland gorilla known for learning a limited amount of a modified version of American Sign Language (ASL) and for being at the center of a lawsuit. Currently resides at Cincinnati Zoo in Cincinnati, Ohio.
- Ozzie (1961–2022) — western lowland gorilla the Zoo Atlanta.
- Pattycake (1972–2013), first baby gorilla born in New York, mother of 10, later died in captivity at Bronx Zoo
- Rita (c. 1928–1940), chimpanzee at Tennōji Zoo
- Sandra (1986–) — orangutan involved in historic legal case in Argentina involving personhood for nonhumans
- Sami (1979–1992) — chimpanzee at the Belgrade Zoo, known for escaping his enclosure twice in February of 1988
- Samson (1949–1981)—for many years the face of the Milwaukee County Zoo, one of the largest silverback gorillas on record, weighing 652 lbs. (296 kg) in 1973
- Santino, a male chimpanzee at Furuvik zoo in Sweden, was notable for having the cognitive skills for forward planning (calmly collecting stones, and later throwing them at visitors).
- Shabani, a male western lowland gorilla known for his "photogenic" and "metrosexual" appearance, as well as his talent for tightrope walking. Currently resides at the Higashiyama Zoo in Nagoya, Japan.
- Snowflake (1964–2003), the only known albino lowland gorilla.
- Susie (1931–1947) Cincinnati Zoo. One of the most popular animals at the zoo until her death on October 29, 1947.
- Timmy (1959–2011), died at 52 as the oldest male gorilla in North America.
- Tonda (1958-2009), an orangutan, known for his friendship with a kitten named T.K. at ZooWorld in Panama City Beach, Florida.
- Willie B. (1959–2000), a silverback gorilla kept in isolation for 27 years, became head of a troop and father of five.
- Fatou (b. 1957), the oldest living gorilla in the world and residing at Berlin Zoo, Germany.

== Circus use ==
- Gargantua (1929–1949)—acid-scarred gorilla captured in the wild, performed in the Ringling Bros. and Barnum & Bailey Circus
- Toto (1931–1968)—Gargantua's would-be mate
- John Daniel and John Daniel II, western gorillas that toured briefly with Ringling

== As politicians ==
- Macaco Tião, a chimpanzee, had the habit of throwing excrement at visitors (including several politicians) to the Rio de Janeiro Zoo. A satirical newspaper ran his candidature for Rio de Janeiro mayor in 1988, and he got 9.5% of the votes, just behind Marcello Alencar and César Maia.
- Colossus the Gorilla was a main attraction at Benson's Wild Animal Farm in Hudson, New Hampshire, who attempted to have Colossus put on the ballot in the 1980 New Hampshire Republican Presidential primary. The zoo tried to argue that the U.S. Constitution does not specify that a native-born candidate has to be human.

== Pets ==
- Bubbles (b. 1983)—chimpanzee belonging to singer Michael Jackson from 1985 to 2005. Appeared in Jackson's "Liberian Girl" music video. In 2005, Jackson admitted that Bubbles had grown from the cute and cuddly 10 lb (4.5 kg) "baby" Jackson had treated as a human child, to a very large, very strong, pugnacious 185 lb (84 kg) adult male. Bubbles was initially moved to a private wildlife reserve in the late 1980s, and in 2004, he was relocated to the Center for Great Apes, in Wauchula, Florida.
- Moe, a chimpanzee who lived with NASCAR driver St. James Davis and his wife in California until he was seized by authorities. When later visiting Moe, they were attacked and disfigured by two other chimpanzees.

== Wild ==
- Alba, only known orangutan with albinism, rescued in 2017 and rehabilitated by Borneo Orangutan Survival before being released in 2018.

== See also ==
- List of individual monkeys
- List of fictional primates
- Monkeys and apes in space
- Oldest hominids
