= Ken Allen =

Bornean orangutan at the San Diego Zoo (1971–2000)

- Other name: The Hairy Houdini
- Species: Bornean orangutan
- Sex: Male
- Born: February 13, 1971; San Diego Zoo, San Diego, California, United States
- Died: December 1, 2000 (aged 29)
- Cause of death: Euthanasia issued due to b-cell lymphoma
- Known for: Escaping from his enclosures repeatedly

Kenneth Allen (February 13, 1971 – December 1, 2000) was a male Bornean orangutan at the San Diego Zoo in California, United States. He became one of the most popular animals in the zoo's history because of his many successful escapes from his enclosures. He was nicknamed "The Hairy Houdini".

Ken Allen was born in captivity at the San Diego Zoo in 1971. In 1985, he gained worldwide attention for a series of escapes from his enclosure, which had been thought to be escape-proof. During some of his escapes, his female companions joined him. Ken Allen's ability to outwit his keepers and his docile demeanor during his escapes resulted in fame. He had his own fan club and was the subject of T-shirts and bumper stickers (most reading "Free Ken Allen"). A song about his escapades, "The Ballad of Ken Allen", was written by Dennis Gersten.

Ken Allen developed B-cell lymphoma and was euthanized on December 1, 2000. He was 29 years old.

== Early life ==
Ken Allen was born in captivity on February 13, 1971, at the San Diego Zoo. Shortly after birth, he had to be separated from his mother after she attempted to smother him. He was named after zookeeper Ken Willingham and police officer Ben Allen. In his book about animal resistance, author Jason Hribal writes that Ken Allen "would unscrew every nut that he could find and remove the bolts" in his zoo nursery.

== Escapes ==
In 1985, during his escapes on June 13, July 29, and August 13, Ken Allen peacefully strolled around the zoo looking at other animals. Ken Allen never acted violently or aggressively towards zoo patrons or animals except for another orangutan called Otis, whom he despised. During his third escape, he was caught stoning Otis and had to be led back to his enclosure. After the attack, the zoo temporarily placed him in solitary confinement.

Zookeepers were initially stumped over how Ken Allen escaped. Staff began surveillance of his enclosure to try to catch him in the act, only to find that he seemed to be aware that he was being watched. Prior to the August 13 escape, he was seen with a crowbar in his enclosure but tossed it aside—as if uninterested—when a staff member walked by. The zookeepers decided to go "undercover," posing as tourists to learn Ken Allen's escape route, but the ape was not fooled and continued to evolve his tactics. In April 1986, he escaped when the moat inside his enclosure was being repaired.

After each escape, Ken Allen would be placed in solitary confinement until zoo staff figured out ways to prevent future escapes. Yet Ken Allen persisted, despite consequences—including encountering electrical fencing on an escape attempt in 1986. Moreover, other orangutans followed Ken Allen's lead and escaped.

In 1987, zoo officials hired experienced rock climbers to find every finger-, toe- and foothold within the enclosure, spending $40,000 to eliminate the identified holds.

Time in 2013 listed Ken Allen's story as one of the "Top Eleven Zoo Escapes".

== See also ==
- List of individual apes – List of notable non-human apes
