= Bonnie (orangutan) =

American orangutan

- Species: Orangutan
- Breed: Hybrid Bornean/Sumatran
- Sex: Female
- Born: 1976 (age 49–50)
- Known for: Whistling
- Residence: National Zoo in Washington, D.C.

Bonnie (born 1976, in Rio Grande Zoo) is a hybrid female Bornean/Sumatran orangutan living at the National Zoo in Washington, D.C., since 1980.

She began spontaneously whistling, mimicking an animal caretaker making the sound. This is significant as whistling is a sound that is in a human's—but not an orangutan's—repertoire. While some "lower primates" have been shown to make non-standard sounds for their species, it has always been the result of intense training, whereas Bonnie picked up the new sound mechanism through imitation. Furthermore, she seems to whistle just because she likes the sound, as opposed to producing this behavior in response to a potential food reward. Bonnie's whistling was documented in the journal Primates by Dr. Serge Wich et al.

== See also ==
- List of individual apes
