= Little Mama =

American female chimpanzee

- Species: Chimpanzee
- Sex: Female
- Born: February 14, 1938
- Died: November 14, 2017 (aged 79)
- Cause of death: Kidney failure
- Known for: Oldest known chimpanzee ever in captivity, ice skating
- Residence: Lion Country Safari

Little Mama (born between 1937 and 1942, died on November 14, 2017) was an American chimpanzee at Lion Country Safari in Loxahatchee (near West Palm Beach) in Palm Beach County, Florida, known for being considered the oldest member of her species ever recorded by the time of her death, when she was thought to be in her late 70s.

Her age was estimated at between 30 and 35 by primatologist Jane Goodall in 1972, and the Safari settled on February 14, 1938, as her birth date for commemorative purposes. She arrived at the Safari in 1967, after having spent time performing as an ice skater, possibly in the Ice Capades.

== See also ==
- Oldest hominids
- List of individual apes
