= Fatou (gorilla) =

Oldest gorilla in the world (born 1957)

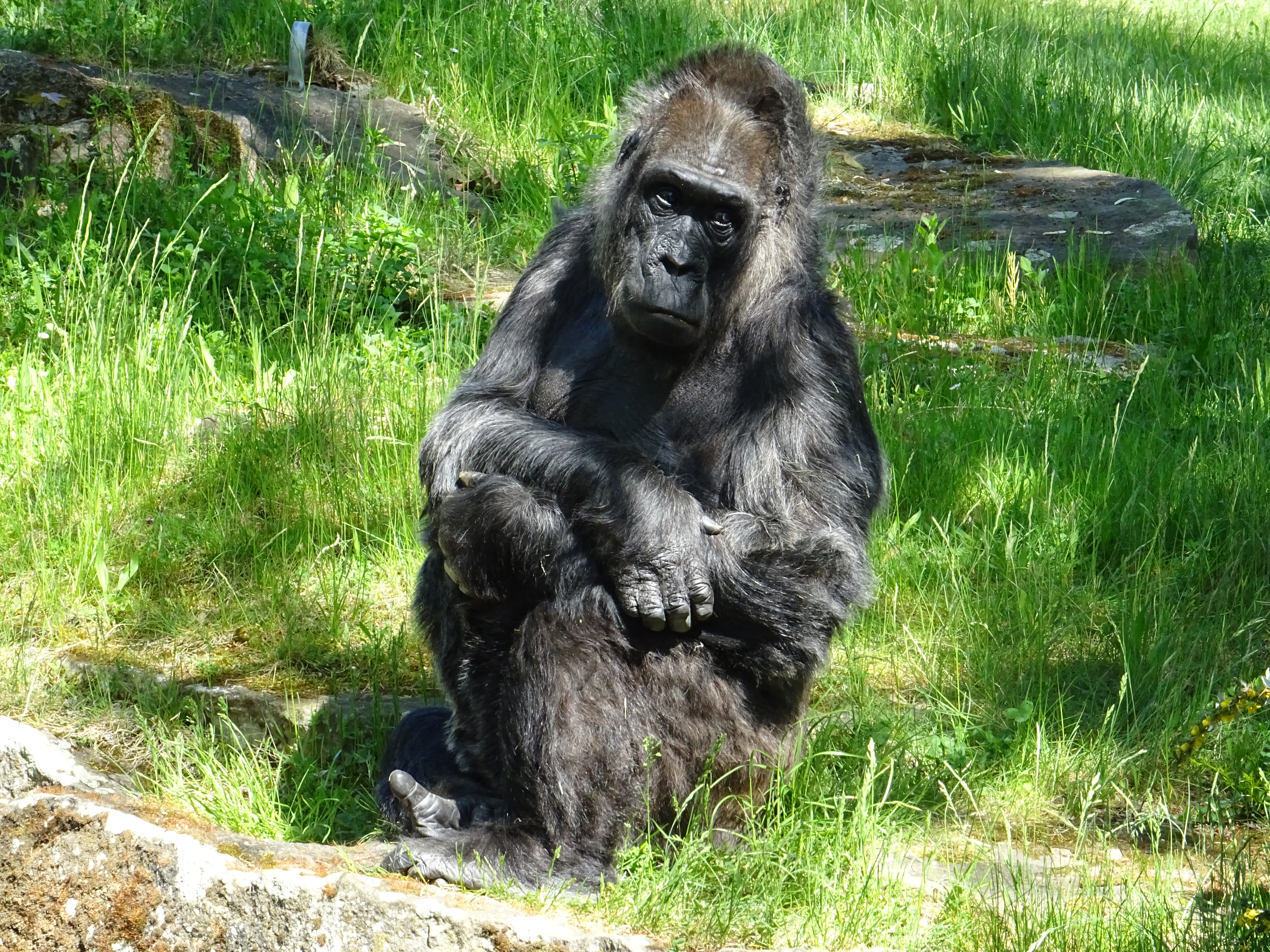
- Fatou in 2018
- Species: Lowland gorilla
- Born: 1957 (age 68–69); West Africa
- Known for: Oldest living gorilla
- Residence: Berlin Zoo

Fatou (born c. 1957) is a gorilla residing at Berlin Zoo, Germany. She was born in West Africa, and was brought from West Africa to France by a sailor in 1959. She was then acquired by the Berlin Zoo. On 30 October 1974, she gave birth to the first gorilla to be raised in Berlin, Dufte.

Since the death of Trudy on 24 July 2019, she became the oldest living gorilla in the world. On 25 July 2020 she surpassed Trudy's final age of 63 years, 204 days and became the oldest gorilla in recorded history. After the death of Helen, on 14 October 2022, Fatou became the last surviving gorilla born in the 1950s.

While she was one of the oldest gorillas in the world, zookeepers of Berlin Zoo selected April 13 as her official birthday.

Through her only offspring, Dufte, Fatou is a grandmother of two, great-grandmother of 13 (five living), great-great-grandmother of 20 (twelve living) and great-great-great-grandmother of three.

== See also ==
- List of individual apes
- Oldest apes#Gorillas

Preceded by Trudy	World's oldest living Gorilla; 24 July 2019 —	Incumbent
