= Andy Warhol (disambiguation) =

Andy Warhol (1928–1987) was an American artist, film director, and producer.

Andy Warhol may also refer to:

- "Andy Warhol" (song), a 1971 song by David Bowie
- “Andy Warhol”, a song by Robbie Williams from Under the Radar Volume 2
- Andy Warhol: A Documentary Film, a 2006 documentary by Ric Burns about Andy Warhol
- Andy Warhol Museum of Modern Art, a museum in Slovakia
- Andy Warhol Bridge, a bridge in Downtown Pittsburgh, Pennsylvania
- The Andy Warhol Museum, a museum on the North Shore of Pittsburgh, Pennsylvania
- Andy Warhol Foundation for the Visual Arts
- Andy Warhol, a 1965 short film directed by Marie Menken
- "Andy Warhol", a song by Little Birdy from the 2004 album BigBigLove
- "Andy Warhol", a song by Strung Out from the 2009 album Agents of the Underground
- "Andy Warhol", a song by Stereo Total from the 2010 album Baby ouh!
- "Andy Warhol (3:59 of Fame)", a song by Evan and Jaron from the 1998 album We've Never Heard of You Either

== See also ==
- Warhol (disambiguation)
- Andy Warhol Foundation for the Visual Arts, Inc. v. Goldsmith, civil lawsuit contesting the reuse of copyrighted work
