= Darwin (monkey) =

"Ikea Monkey" who went viral

- Excerpt of the 2012 viral image of Darwin wearing a shearling coat
- Other name: Ikea Monkey
- Species: Japanese macaque
- Sex: Male
- Born: c. May 2012 (age 14)
- Residence: Story Book Farm Primate Sanctuary, Sunderland, Ontario

Darwin (born c. May 2012), colloquially referred to as the Ikea Monkey, is a male Japanese macaque who attracted international media attention in 2012 after images of him wandering an IKEA store in North York, Ontario, Canada, went viral. Darwin was determined to be a prohibited exotic pet and surrendered to Story Book Farm, an Ontario-based animal sanctuary where he now resides. A lawsuit brought by Darwin's former owner against Story Book Farm to return the animal was dismissed in 2013.

== History ==
External videos
- "Lost monkey roams Ikea", from CNN in 2012
- "What Happened to the Ikea Monkey?", from the CBC in 2018
- "10 years later, the Ikea monkey is doing 'amazingly well'", from CP24 in 2022

On December 9, 2012, a Japanese macaque wearing a shearling coat and a diaper was seen wandering the parking garage at an IKEA in North York, Toronto, Ontario. The macaque, which had escaped from a crate inside a car in the parking garage, was peacefully herded into a corner of the facility before being recovered by Toronto Animal Services. Photos of the macaque from passersby shared on Twitter, Instagram, and other social media sites subsequently went viral, attracting international media attention as the "Ikea Monkey".

The "stylish but illegal monkey", so designated by The Globe and Mail, was later identified as "Darwin", a seven-month-old pet monkey owned by Toronto-based attorney Yasmin Nakhuda. Darwin lived in Nakhuda's home with her husband and two children, who maintained a YouTube account featuring videos of the macaque. Laws relating to the ownership of exotic pets in Ontario vary by municipality; as macaques are considered prohibited animals under the Toronto Municipal Code, Nakhuda was fined CA$240 and asked to surrender the animal, which was sent to the Story Book Farm Primate Sanctuary in Sunderland, north of Toronto.

On December 16, Nakhuda filed a lawsuit against Story Book Farm to recover Darwin, alleging that the sanctuary was "unlawfully detain[ing]" the macaque and that she had been forced to sign surrender papers under threat of criminal charges. The lawsuit was dismissed on September 13, 2013, with the court finding no evidence of coercion and ruling that Darwin is a wild animal "by virtue of his behaviour and qualities", and that Nakhuda "lost ownership of the monkey when she lost possession". In January 2014, Nakhuda was ordered to pay $83,000 in legal fees to Story Book Farm. She abandoned plans to appeal the ruling in February 2014, and by 2015 had purchased two new monkeys and moved to Pontypool, Ontario, which does not prohibit the ownership of exotic pets.

Darwin has resided at Story Book Farm since 2012. Workers reported that Darwin was shy and under-socialized when he arrived at the sanctuary, but that he gradually acclimated to playing with other macaques, and now has a best friend named Maximus. He resides in a mixed indoor-outdoor enclosure, and enjoys playing on a jungle gym made from fire hoses.

== See also ==
- List of individual monkeys
- Pockets Warhol, a capuchin monkey formerly also housed at Story Book Farm
- Punch (monkey)
