= Jo Mendi II =

Male chimpanzee performer

- Jo Mendi II, c. 1949
- Species: Chimpanzee
- Sex: Male
- Born: c. 1939
- Died: January 6, 1980 (aged 40–41); Detroit Zoo, Detroit, Michigan
- Occupation: Performer
- Years active: 1946–1953
- Owner: Detroit Zoo
- Named after: Joe Mendi

Jo Mendi II (c. 1939 – January 6, 1980) was a male chimpanzee and performer. He earned a reputation as "the greatest performing chimp of all time."

Mendi II was acquired by the Detroit Zoo in the fall of 1945. He was a gift to the zoo from James S. Holden and his wife.

Mendi made his performing debut in May 1946 at the Detroit Zoo's chimpanzee theater. On the zoo's "opening Sunday", Mendi was credited with attracting a record crowd estimated at 45,000 persons. With his talents for riding a bike, roller skating, and walking the tight rope, Mendi became the zoo's star attraction. For the summer of 1946, the zoo attracted a record total of 1,350,000 persons, 30% higher than the previous record.

In the summer of 1949, the zoo's chimpanzee theater, then known as the "Jo Mendi Theater", attracted 168,276 persons. In October 1953, zoo director Frank J. McInnis announced that, after eight summers as the zoo's star attraction, Mendi was retiring from public performing. He gave his final performance at the zoo on November 1, 1953, having attracted more than 1,250,000 persons to his shows at the zoo.

In 1958, the Detroit Free Press reported that Mendi, at age 17, remained in his cage at the zoo, living within earshot of the zoo's ape theater, largely forgotten. In 1966, it was reported that he had special quarters in the zoo's Great Ape House, where "like any old vaudevillian [he] 'hams it up' when he can get an audience." Zoo director McInnis vowed to maintain a place for Mendi as long as he lived, noting: "If Yankee Stadium was the house that Ruth built, our Chimp Theater owes it all to Jo." McInnis called Mendi "a clown who loved audiences" and "knew the value of pratfalls." Mendi died in his cage at the Detroit Zoo in January 1980.

== See also ==
- List of individual apes
