= Tillamook Cheddar (dog) =

Jack Russell dog that could paint

- Other name: Tillie
- Species: Dog
- Breed: Jack Russell Terrier
- Sex: Female
- Born: January 17, 1999; Greenwich, Connecticut
- Died: January 29, 2014 (aged 15)
- Notable role: Artist
- Owner: F. Bowman Hastie III
- Named after: Tillamook Cheddar
- http://www.tillamookcheddar.com/

Tillamook Cheddar (January 17, 1999 - January 29, 2014; Tillie for short) was a Jack Russell terrier dog from Greenwich, Connecticut, who acquired a reputation as an artist. She had work on display at the National Arts Club, collaborating on pieces that were shown with human artists such as Tom Sachs and Dirk Westphal.

== Background ==
A 16-pound (7.25 kg) Jack Russell terrier with a white coat and brown and black markings on her face, she was named for Tillamook Cheddar, a brand of cheese produced in the U.S. state of Oregon. She lived in the Clinton Hill neighborhood of Brooklyn, New York, with her owner, F. Bowman Hastie III, a freelance writer and editor. Hastie, who grew up in Oregon, served as her agent, publicist, and manager.

Hastie received Tillamook Cheddar as a 30th birthday gift from his mother, picking her out of a litter in Greenwich, Connecticut. Hastie first noted what he thought were her artistic inclinations when she was six months of age; while he was sitting on his couch writing on a legal pad, she jumped up and began scratching at the pad. Believing that she was attempting to communicate in some way, he affixed a sheet of carbon paper to the pad and she scratched her first image.

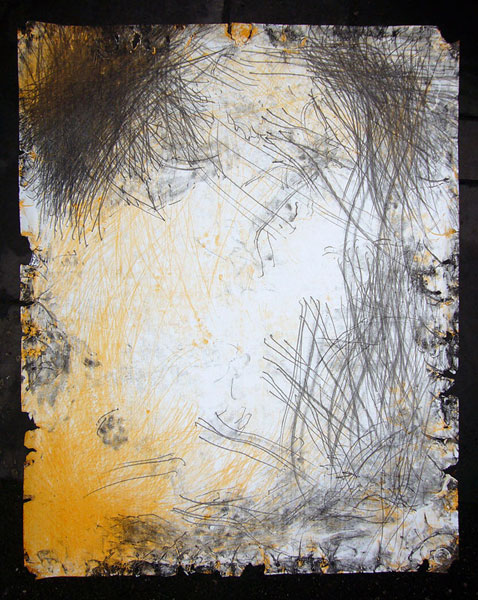
Tillamook Cheddar's 2008 painting "Unicorn Tapestry".

== Reception of work ==
In 2004 Parade Magazine described her as "Best New Artist" and in 2005 The Art Newspaper said she was "the most successful living animal painter".

Art critic Michael Mills of the New Times Broward-Palm Beach said:

But to address a nagging question, do Tillie's scratchings and bitings add up to art? Not to my way of thinking, and here's why. To qualify as a work of art, at least in these postmodern times, a thing must be created with intent, and animals are not capable of intent in the same way humans are.

Mills also quoted Jerry Saltz of The Village Voice who called the work a "sham".

== Appearances and exhibitions ==
In 2007, she painted in a public multimedia event called "Tillie Jazz," in collaboration with a live jazz trio (pianist Dred Scott, tenor saxophonist Bill McHenry, and drummer RJ Miller).

Tillamook Cheddar appeared on CNN Sunday Morning, with hosts Anderson Cooper and Catherine Callaway on September 29, 2002.

On November 30, 2006, Tillamook Cheddar (presented as "Tillie the Canine Artist") appeared as a featured guest on Late Night with Conan O'Brien.

On December 1, 2006, Sean Cole of Studio 360 mentioned her as an animal artist.

== See also ==
- Congo (chimpanzee)
- List of individual dogs
