= Pockets Warhol =

Canadian monkey artist (1992–2026)

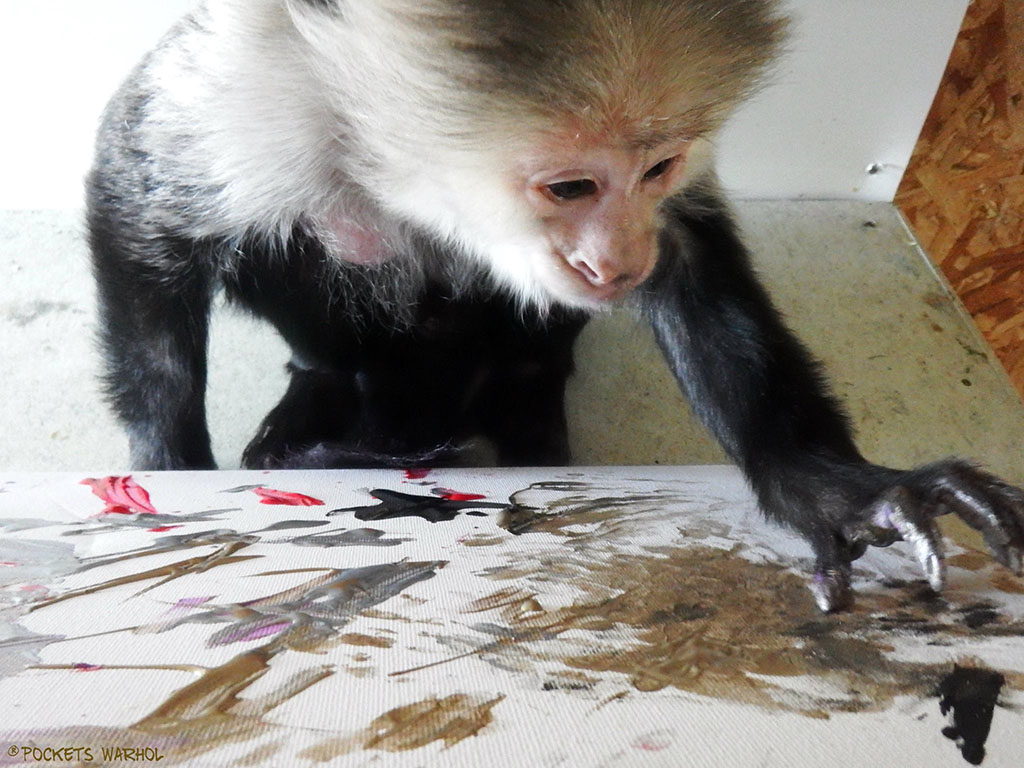
- Pockets painting Queen in 2017
- Species: Capuchin monkey
- Sex: Male
- Born: April 1, 1992; British Columbia, Canada
- Died: March 2, 2026 (aged 33); Ontario, Canada
- Occupation: Animal artist (painter)
- Residence: Story Book Farm Primate Sanctuary, Sunderland, Ontario, Canada
- Named after: Andy Warhol

Pockets Warhol (April 1, 1992 – March 2, 2026) was a Canadian capuchin monkey at Story Book Farm Primate Sanctuary near Sunderland, Ontario, Canada. Pockets came to media attention in 2011 when the sanctuary held a fundraiser featuring 40 paintings by the monkey.

== Early life ==
According to the sanctuary, Pockets was born on April 1, 1992, and lived his early life as a pet in British Columbia. In 2009, Pockets' owner was finding herself challenged to look after him, and searched for a place that could take him. On finding Story Book Farm, she flew with Pockets to Ontario, and stayed with Pockets for a week to get him comfortable in his new home. The former owner still later kept in touch with the sanctuary.

== Start as an artist ==
Shortly after Pockets arrived at the sanctuary, one of the volunteers, Charmaine Quinn, gave Pockets his surname of Warhol because his white hair reminded her of Andy Warhol. This also prompted Quinn to give Pockets some children's paints to keep him busy. In December 2011, having accumulated 40 of Pockets' paintings, the sanctuary arranged an exhibition of the paintings at a Toronto diner, helping to raise funds for the sanctuary. The event was covered in the Toronto Star, which in turn triggered international media coverage in/on: CBC, Global News, the Huffington Post (USA), Maclean's magazine, and Vv Magazine. A few months later, Pockets' paintings were made available for sale online.

== Art collaboration ==
In September 2013, Brent Roe and Scott Cameron, also known as Scotch Camera, joined an art show with Pockets Warhol at the Gladstone hotel in Toronto. In September 2014, MacLeans listed Pockets as the #8 top selling art animal in the world, based on the top price fetched for a single item. According to Quinn, Pockets' work has been featured in art shows as far away as Estonia, Finland, and Italy, and purchased online from as far away as Tasmania.

In May 2016, Anita Kunz visited Pockets at the sanctuary, and subsequently donated one of her own paintings for Pockets to 'enhance'. Ms. Kunz later organized an art show with 80 other artists as a new fundraiser for the sanctuary, held at The Papermill Gallery, Todmorden Mills from April 6–16, 2017. Other participants in this collaboration included: Barry Blitt, Marc Burckhardt, Cynthia von Buhler, Seymour Chwast, Sue Coe, Yuri Dojc, Louis Fishauf, Jill Greenberg, Terry Mosher, Tim O'Brien, Ralph Steadman, Ann Telnaes, and Martin Wittfooth.

== Celebrity interactions ==
In April 2012, sanctuary volunteers Charmaine Quinn and Izzy Hirji presented Jane Goodall with a photo of Pockets and a painting by Pockets for her birthday at the Jane Goodall Institute in Toronto.

In March 2015, the sanctuary sent a painting by Pockets to Ricky Gervais and Jane Fallon as a 'Thank you' for their support of animal rights. In June 2015, Ricky Gervais tweeted that he was donating an acoustic guitar to the sanctuary, with mention of Pockets Warhol. After his performance in Toronto in September 2015, Gervais donated the guitar he used there, which subsequently raised US$4,150 in an online auction. The winning bidder lives in the United Kingdom. As of February 15, 2019, the guitar was up for auction again having been signed by several other celebrities: Brian May, Peter Frampton, Will Ferrell, Bryan Cranston, Dhani Harrison, Ricky Warwick, and Steve Cutts. This time the proceeds were split between Story Book Farm Primate Sanctuary and Brian May's Save Me organization.

In 2020, Martin Gore of Depeche Mode commissioned artwork by Pockets to be used as the cover art for his latest EP, The Third Chimpanzee, see photos at right. The artwork is also featured in the accompanying music videos. Martin Gore discussed this collaboration in an interview with Rolling Stone magazine on January 27, 2021. The EP was released by Mute Records on January 29, 2021. One track, Mandrill, was released early on 2020-11-17. A second track, Howler, was released January 7, 2021.

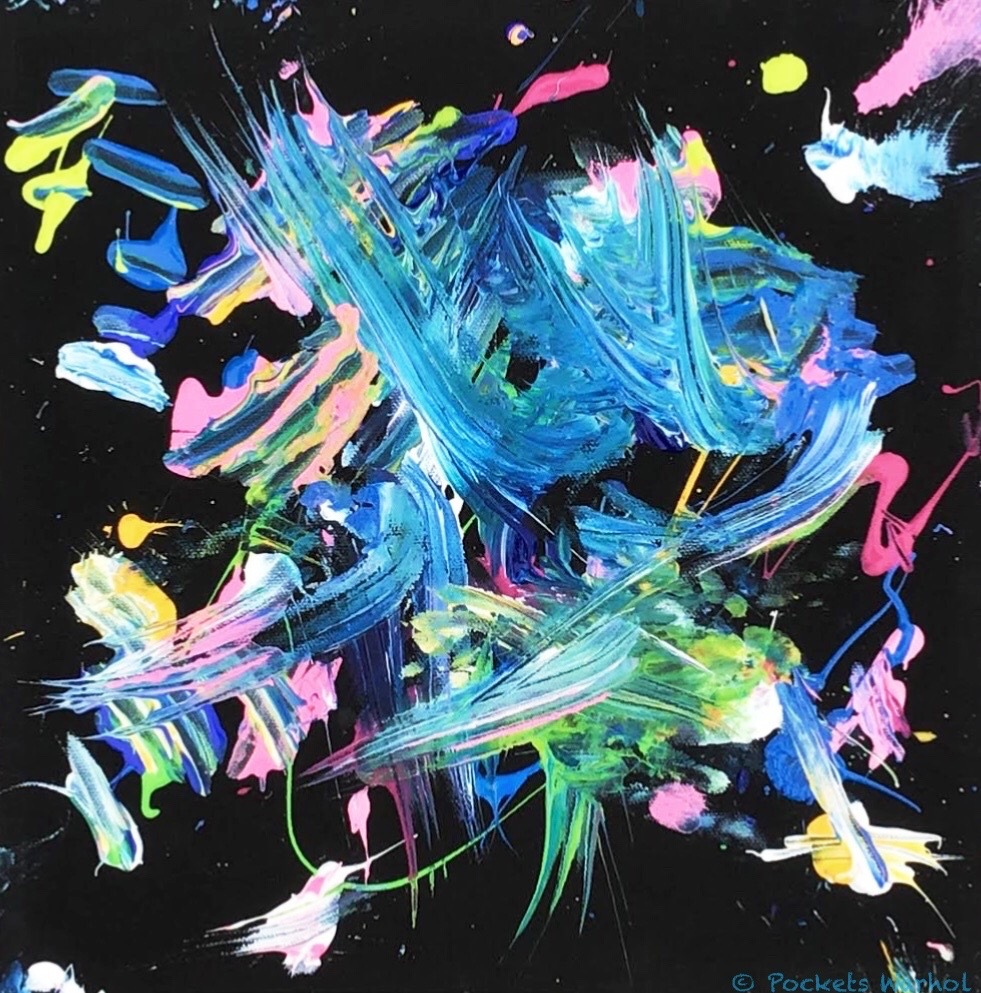
Breaking the Fourth Wall by Pockets Warhol used for the front album cover of The Third Chimpanzee (2021 EP) by Martin Gore

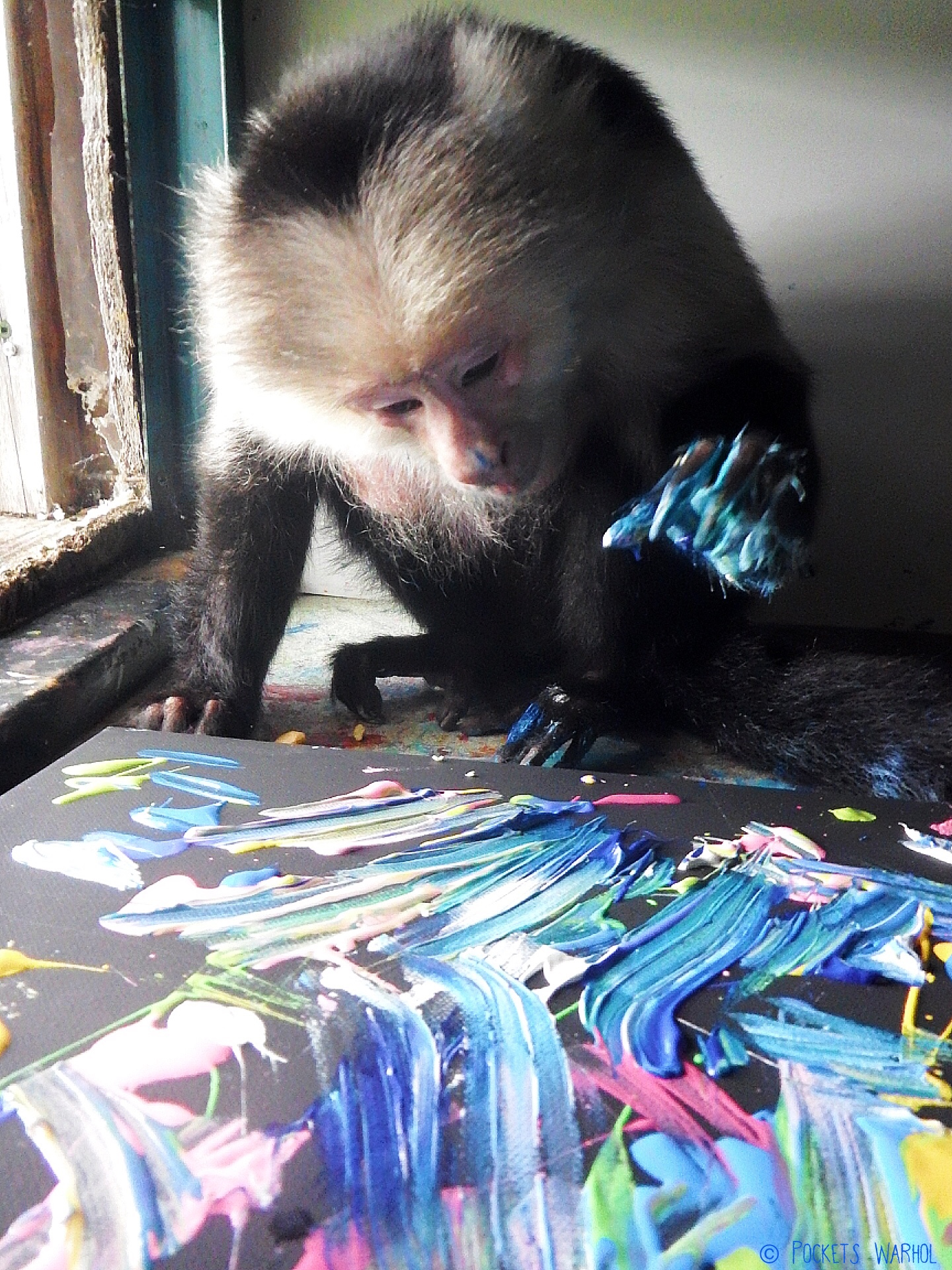
Pockets painting Breaking the Fourth Wall

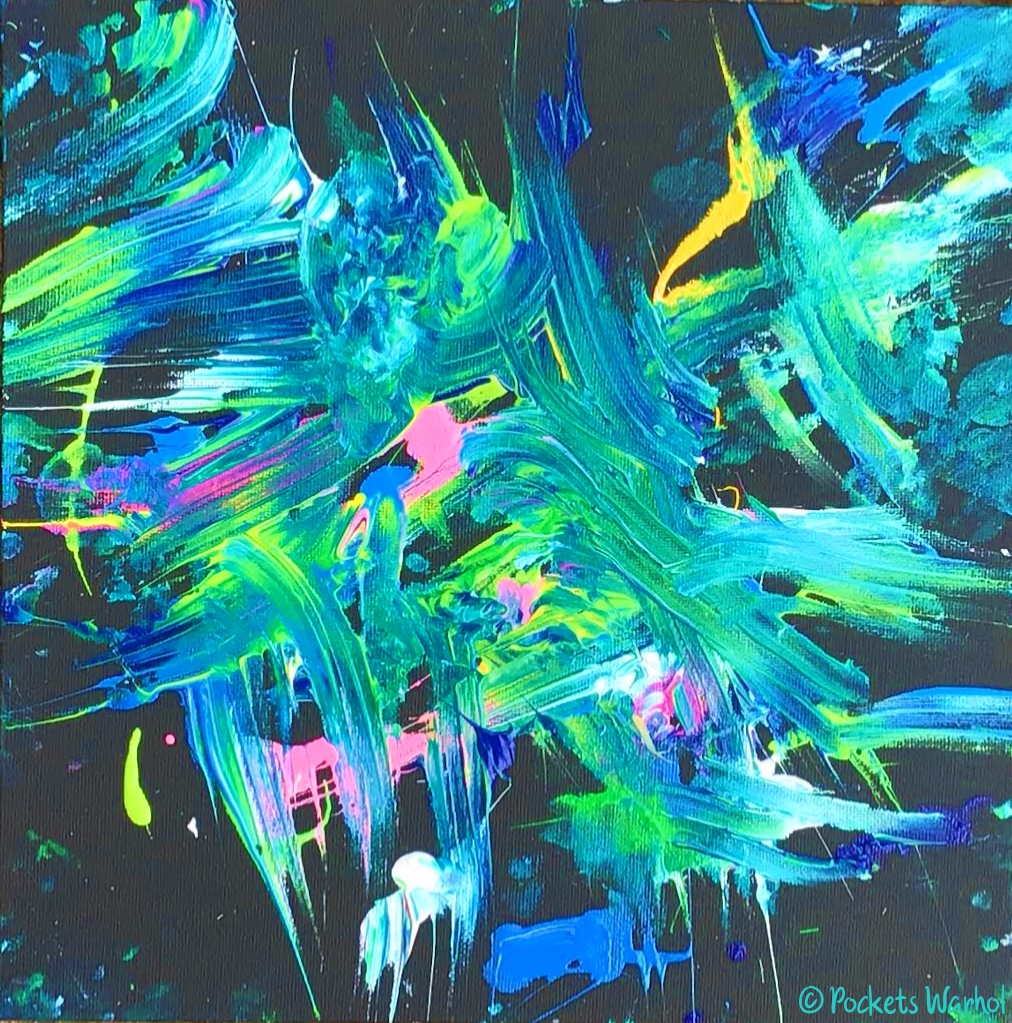
Fiona, a painting by Pockets Warhol, used for the back album cover of the EP The Third Chimpanzee by Martin Gore

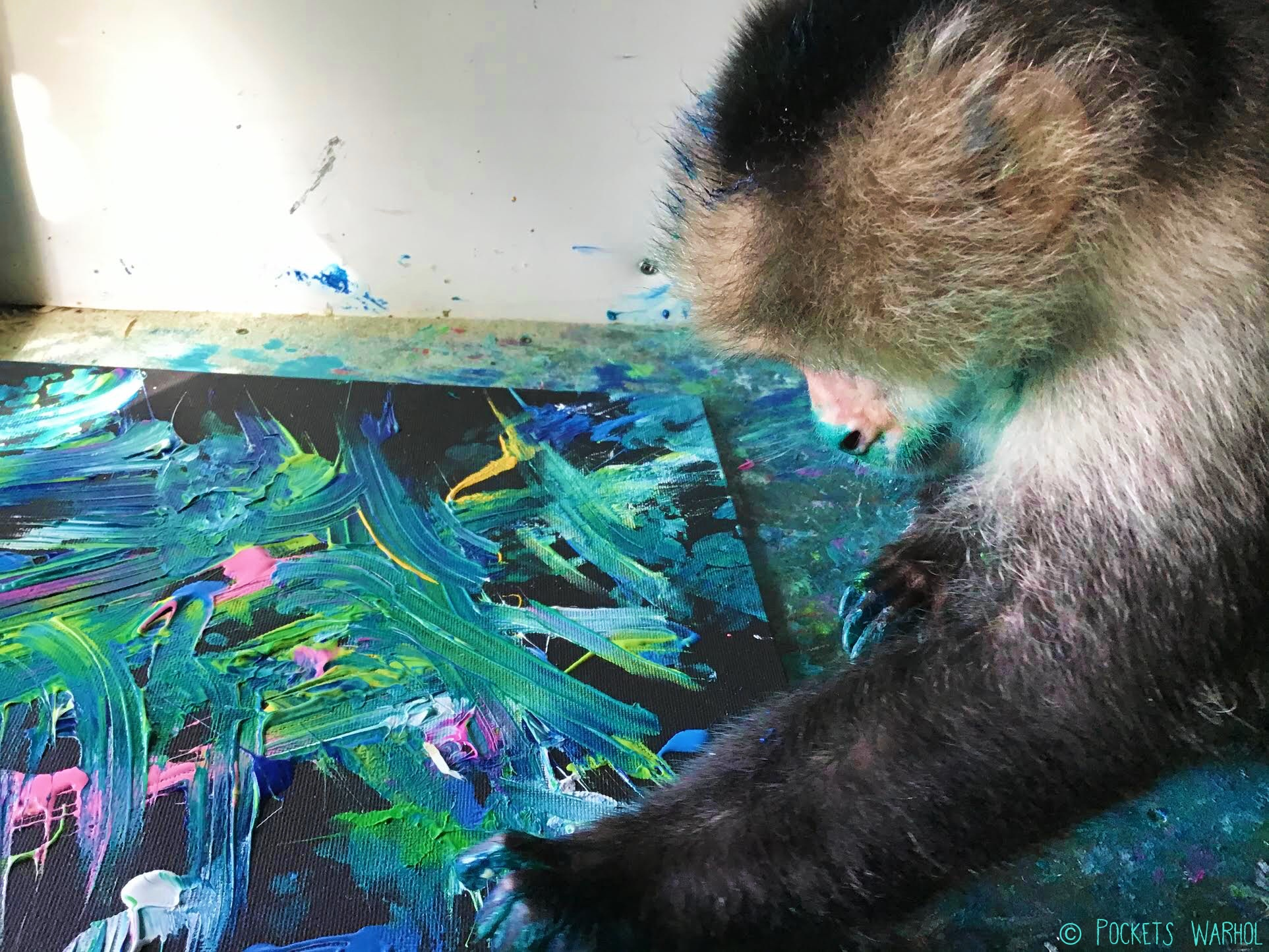
Pockets painting Fiona

== Death ==
Pockets Warhol died on March 2, 2026, at the age of 33.

== See also ==
- Animal-made art
- Congo (chimpanzee)
- Darwin (monkey)
- List of individual monkeys
- Pierre Brassau
