= Peter (chimpanzee) =

Vaudeville performer

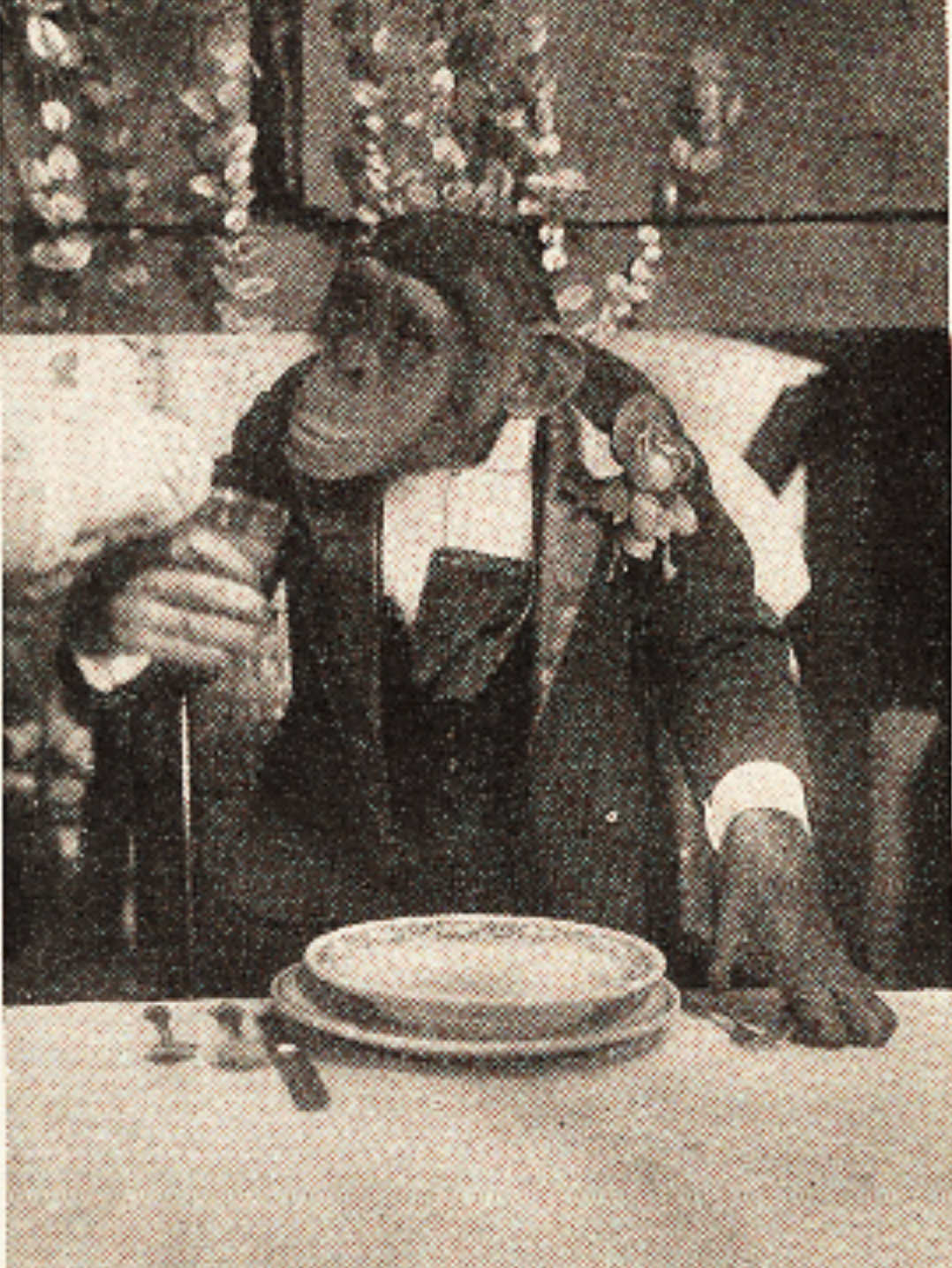
Peter, a chimpanzee, entertained audiences at Keith's Theater in Philadelphia in the early 1900s

Peter was a vaudeville performer active between 1907 and 1910 in Europe and the USA. In Europe, he entertained British royalty and had shows in Paris, London, and Germany. In America, he performed in New York, Buffalo, Pittsburgh, Detroit, Boston and other American cities. As a subject of scientific interest, he was taken to universities and was the subject of two published research papers. It is possible Peter inspired Franz Kafka's 1917 short story, "A Report to an Academy", about a chimpanzee who escapes life in a cage by becoming a human-like stage performer named Red Peter.

== Biography ==
Peter was captured in Senegambia around 1904. By 1907, he was owned and trained by Joseph McArdle and his wife, Barbara McArdle, who raised him with their daughter. According the Pittsburg Daily Post, he had an adversion to policemen which the newspaper explained as due to Peter not being able to distinguish them from French militia and his "hair-breadth escapes from the French soldiers in Africa whose week-ends are spent hunting creatures like Peter".

Between 1907 and 1909, he performed in Europe, including stays at the Folles Bergere in Paris and the Palace Theatre London. In July 1908, he entertained King Edward VII and Queen Alexandra at Buckingham Palace. In 1909, he travelled on the liner Philadelphia, docking in New York on Aug 1, where he was welcomed by Arthur Hammerstein. On August 2, he started a residency at Hammerstein's Paradise Roof Garden. He visited Newport and was received by "exclusive society." On September 12, he visited Boston, where "several hundred people were at the South station to welcome him." In Boston, he performed at Keith's Theatre. He made publicised vaudeville appearances during 1910 in other US cities, including Buffalo, Pittsburgh, and Detroit.

Peter visited Harvard University, where Prof. Dudley Allen Sargent, Prof. Edward Huntington and Prof. Granville Stanley Hall were "united in pronouncing him the nearest approach to a man the world had ever seen. Sargent is quoted as saying Peter "was born a monkey, but made himself a man." While in Detroit, he visited the University of Michigan and the Detroit College of Medicine, where Prof George McClellan entertained Peter before an audience in the clinical hall of the college.

His future whereabouts are unknown, but one news report noted, "He is shortly to sail for Europe, where at Oxford, Cambridge, Heidelberg and other old world centres of education, he will enlighten the scholar and the public".

== Stage act ==
Peter, dressed like a man, sat down to a table, put on a napkin and ate food with a knife and fork. After eating, he struck a match, lighted a candle, lighted a cigarette and smoked. He gave his keeper, McArdle, a light for the latter's cigarette from his own.

Upon command from the keeper, the ape danced on the stage fairly well, much like a man, a sort of jig-dance.

When roller-skates were put on his feet, he skated around the stage skilfully. He appeared to skate as well as a girl whom he chased around the stage.

The animal got upon a bicycle himself and rode it around the stage. He chased the girl around the stage while riding the wheel. While riding, he drank water from a cup handed him. Then he skilfully rode between a number of bottles and cut a sort of figure 8 while riding between the bottles. The ape picked up a bottle and drank out of it while riding.

The animal rode the bicycle up an inclined plane on the stage. I noticed that he always increased his speed just before coming to the inclined plane.

After performing these feats, Peter undressed and went to bed, very much like a man does.

Detroit Free Press remarked

Many extraordinary stamians have been introduced to the American theater-going public in vandueville, and Manager Moore, of the Timpe, has had the best of them. It is said, however, that none of them approaches Peter in the marvelous and man-like thing that he accomplishes.

It was reported that Alfred Butt of the Palace Theatre London offered to buy him for $50,000 and that his act in America earned $2,000 a week.

== Research ==
Peter was investigated by Lightner Witmer with William Henry Furness at his Psychological Clinic at the University of Pennsylvania and by W. T. Shepherd of Waynesburg College.

Witmer had attended a performance of Peter at Boston's Keith Theater and afterwards arranged to study him when he visited Philadelphia. There at Witmer's Clinic, "testing was carried out in a large room with over a hundred persons observing; it is doubtful, however, that the presence of this group bothered Peter, because he was used to performing before crowds". Peter was tested on his ability to string beads, place pins in a pegging board, open a lock, hammer nails, use a screwdriver, place shaped blocks into a form board, and copy the letter W with chalk on a blackboard. Peter succeeded on all tasks except the formboard. Witmer also listed needle-threading among the feats he watched Peter perform on stage, and reported the McArdles' claim that Peter had threaded a needle the first time he tried.

W. T. Shepherd found upon command from his keeper, Peter could use a hammer and nail to drive a nail into the wall, "quickly and without observable awkwardness". That when he took out my watch and pressed on the stem, slowly, and opened the watch three times while Peter watched and tried with the same actions but failed due to not pressing hard enough upon which he attempted to open it with his finger nails. On being given a writing tablet and a pencil, "He at once seized .them and began scribbling, i.e., making irregular marks on the tablet. 1 made, in his sight, the letter T; a very plain T, with simply one vertical and one horizontal stroke of the pencil. The ape made a rather poor T, the first time shown. He also made a W when I showed him once." Peter on being ordered by his keeper could put a handkerchief around the researcher's neck tying it quickly and correctly and then untying the knot also quickly.

Shepherd found similar abilities but expressed some scepticism given many "horses, dogs, and even pigs may be trained to do many feats". Further, "though the keeper assured me that the ape had had no training m that act, we might doubt the statement. He concluded about the origin of his abilities:

the superior motor-equipment of the animal [was] one of the principal factors. Peter's comparatively perfect hands enabled him to use the knife and fork in eating and to handle a cup in drinking. His man-like lower limbs, his hands and his upright figure enabled him to ride the bicycle, to pick up a bottle and drink while riding, etc. His superior motor-equipment was also, as it seems to the writer, a principal factor in such feats as driving a nail, tying a handkerchief in a knot and untying it, etc., Dogs and other animals, if they had the intelligence, lack the requisite motor-apparatus to do such acts.

Shepherd noted that compared to another chimpanzee called Consul, he had studied and which had shown a "certain roughness of manner and by not obeying his keeper very readily". Shepherd recorded that Consul, too, could thread a needle, cut paper with scissors, and work a padlock with a key.

Peter showed evidences of affection for his keeper by such acts as putting his arm around the latter in a very human-like manner and kissing him. When I questioned Peter's keeper as to sympathy, etc., in apes, to let me see for myself, the keeper, in the ape's sight, pretended to have hurt his hand, whereupon Peter went to him, put his arm around McArdle, and by his acts gave very evident signs of ape sympathy. Peter acted in a similar manner when I also pretended to have hurt my hand.

== Language ==
=== Production ===
Peter could say the word "mama". However, both Witmer and Shepherd raised questions about the human-likeness of its pronunciation.

Witner observed that he articulated the word "mama" with "great effort, and it is the one task which he performs with seeming unwillingness". He judged the articulation of the m sound as perfect. But added, "I am somewhat doubtful whether the ah is voiced or not. It seems to be usually, a vowel produced by an inspiration, possibly at times an expiration, of the breath without bringing the larynx into action".

Sheperd noted that "the wife of the keeper pressed her fingers against the ape's under lip when he spoke the word [mama]."

=== Understanding ===
Witmer found Peter could understand simple requests. "When Peter is asked, "Where is Mama?" he points to Mrs. McArdle. When asked, "Where's Dada ?" he points to Mr. McArdle. When asked, "Where's Peter ?" he taps his shirt front." When Peter was drinking from a tumbler the trainer told him, "Give Mama a drink" and Peter gave the tumbler to her holding it while she drank. Then when told "Give Dada a drink," Peter held it for Mr. McArdle. Upon asking, "Aren't you going to give the Doctor a drink ?" Witmer was offered the tumbler.

In another instance:

At the clinic, he tried once to jump down from the table and run away. The trainer cuffed him over the ears because he was naughty, and said, "ISTow beg pardon." She whispered in his ear for a second, while he listened penitently and with that exaggeration of rapt attention which may be seen on the face of any child in whose ear we whisper. "Kiss Mama," she said, and he turned his face toward her and did it like a child. "Kiss Dada," and he leaned over and kissed Mr. McArdle. "Now Peter, hit Dada," and he slapped Mr. McArdle two or three times with his hands. All this was done without any observable gestures being made by the trainers, simply in obedience to spoken commands which were instantly carried out, without waiting for any other signal.

Witmer predicted:

I venture to predict that within a few years chimpanzees will be taken early in life and subjected for purposes of scientific investigation to a course of procedure more closely resembling that which is accorded the human child.

Witmer's paper on Peter played a role in future attempts to teach language to chimpanzees being cited by Keith and Catherine Hayes, Roger Fouts, Winthrop Kellogg, and Duane M. Rumbaugh.

== Similar named ape in a Kafka short story ==
In 1917, Franz Kafka wrote the short story "A Report to an Academy" about a chimpanzee called Red Peter who escaped life in a zoo and makes himself human-like to perform on stage.

With an effort which up to this point has never been repeated on earth, I have attained the average education of a European. That would perhaps not amount to much, but it is something insofar as it helped me out of the cage and created this special way out for me—the way out of human beings.

In the short story, Red Peter explains the origin of his name, that due to a gunshot injury causing a red mark on his face this was "the only difference between me and the performing ape Peter, who died not so long ago and had some small local reputation". In the book The Simian Tongue, Gregory Radick suggests Lightner Witmer's paper on Peter may be the source of this "performing ape Peter", though given the widespread publicity, Kakfa might have read about him in contemporary newspapers. Peter-André Alt in Franz Kafka. The Eternal Son suggests, however, that the source might be a trained chimpanzee with the name "Konsul Peter" in a Prague vaudeville between September 1908 and April 1909.

== See also ==
- List of individual apes
