= Pan (chimpanzee) =

Japanese chimpanzee

Pankun
- Species: Chimpanzee
- Sex: Male
- Born: October 1, 2001 (age 24); Japan
- Occupation: Television personality
- Years active: 2005-2012
- Residence: Cuddly Dominion Zoo, Kyūshū, Japan

Pan (パン, born October 1, 2001) is a chimpanzee in Japan often featured on the NTV television show Tensai! Shimura Dōbutsuen (天才！志村動物園, lit. Genius! Shimura Zoo) and the TBS program Dōbutsu Kisō Tengai! (どうぶつ奇想天外!, lit. Unbelievable Animals!). Most of the segments feature him and his bulldog friend, James, embarking on a variety of "human" tasks, like buying groceries, planting a rice paddy, or catching insects.

Pan is now owned by Cuddly Dominion, a zoo located beside the volcano Mount Aso, in the Kumamoto Prefecture of Kyūshū. After moving in, Pan has turned into the main event of the zoo, featuring daily stage shows of various themes in Japanese.

== Attack ==
In 2012 when Pan was performing for the Aso Cuddly Dominion Zoo, he attacked a student trainee staff member and severely injured her. The attack was sudden and it left "cuts on her forehead, ears, ankles, and back." The woman was flown by a helicopter to a hospital where she was hospitalized for weeks. As a result, Pan was forced to retire from the show business in the Cuddly Dominion zoo.

== Legacy of the show ==
The show has also been translated into international versions; for Nickelodeon in India as The Munnabhai Show, for JET TV in Taiwan (狗狗猩猩大冒險), for Modern Nine in Thailand (ขำกลิ้งลิงกับหมา) and TVB in Hong Kong (阿笨與阿占) as The Adventures of Pan and James: Chimpanzee and Bulldog on Errands, winning Best Foreign Purchased Program at the 2006 TVB Anniversary Awards. Another show called We Are Friends, which also involves a chimpanzee and a French Bulldog companion, was filmed in Thailand but aired on Zhejiang TV.

== See also ==
- List of individual apes
