= Abang (orangutan) =

English orangutan

- Species: Bornean orangutan (Pongo pygmaeus)
- Sex: Male
- Born: c. 1966; Sarawak, Malaysia
- Occupation: Research subject
- Employer: Bristol Zoo
- Notable role: Subject of stone tool learning experiment
- Owner: Bristol Zoo
- Residence: Bristol Zoo, England
- Mate: Dayang

Abang (born 1966) is an orangutan taught to make stone tools, as a part of a research experiment to determine if this ability is a characteristic unique to humans, the genus Homo, or to the family Hominidae.

== Early life ==
Abang was illegally captured in Sarawak when he was about a year old. After being confiscated by authorities, he was taken with a female, Dayang, to England in 1967 and kept in Bristol Zoo.

== Experiment ==
=== Aim and setup ===
The aim of the experiment was to teach an ape subject, through imitative learning, to use a stone to hammer a flake from a flint and use this flake as a tool to open a box. The experiment was divided into two stages where the subject was given demonstrations and then given the opportunity to do the activity themselves. The aim of the first stage was to get an ape to cut a cord to open a box, using a pre-made flake. The second stage's aim was for the ape to make their own flakes and open the box with them. The demonstration and attempts were done with a sheet aluminium box. A mesh window made the food visible. The box had a lid secured by a cord inside the box, with the cord accessible via a slot.

=== Timeline ===
The experiment started in 1971. The experimental sessions were conducted in an indoor part of the ape's cage, initially with both Abang and Dayang present. After they proved to be a distraction to each other, only Abang was used as a subject. Stage I was conducted in four sessions from March 5 to March 19 with success observed at the end of the second session. Stage II was conducted in seven sessions from March 23 to April 16, with success observed in the sixth session.

=== Conclusion ===
In the opinion of the researcher, while the experiment showed, “... a case of imitative learning it would be misleading to think of Abang's behavior solely as parrot-fashion learning. ... apes possess random exploratory activity and innovations which can lead to new successes.”

== See also ==
- Animal intelligence
- Chantek
- List of individual apes
- Tool use by animals
