= Oldest hominids =

List of oldest hominid species

Humans are the longest-lived hominid species, with Jeanne Calment being the oldest confirmed hominid after living 122 years. Other members of the Hominidae family are shorter-lived, and this article lists the oldest known individuals of each hominid species.

== Bonobos ==
Deceased Living
† denotes age at death, or, if living, age as of 13 November 2026

This list includes all known individuals to have reached the age of 50 years or more. The average lifespan of a captive bonobo is 40 years, the average lifespan of wild bonobos is unknown. The 1 January will be given as the birthday to any individual whose exact birthdate isn't known.

The oldest female bonobo ever (and oldest bonobo overall) was Margrit, who reached the final age of about 70 years. The oldest male bonobo ever was Mato, who reached to the final age of 61 years, 268 days. The oldest living female bonobo is Kombote, aged about 58 years. The oldest living male bonobo is Kevin, aged 51 years, 36 days.

Rank	Name	Sex	Birth date	Death date	Age ^{[†]}	Place of death or residence
1	Margrit	F	early 1950s	27 January 2023	c. 70 years	Germany, Frankfurt Zoological Garden
2	Mato	M	23 December 1963	17 September 2025	61 years, 268 days	Germany, Wuppertal Zoo
3	Kombote	F	1 January 1968	Living	58 years, 316 days	Germany, Wilhelma
4	Lorel	F	17 April 1969	Living	57 years, 210 days	United States, Jacksonville Zoo and Gardens
5	Laura	F	27 August 1967	14 December 2022	55 years, 109 days	United States, Milwaukee County Zoo
6	Louise	F	28 October 1972	Living	54 years, 16 days	Japan, Kumamoto Sanctuary
7	Loretta	F	22 January 1974	Living	52 years, 295 days	United States, San Diego Zoo
8	Kevin	M	8 October 1975	Living	51 years, 36 days	United States, Fort Worth Zoo
9	Vernon	M	1 January 1971	13 December 2021	50 years, 346 days	United States, Cincinnati Zoo and Botanical Garden

== Chimpanzees ==
Deceased Living
† denotes age at death, or, if living, age as of 13 November 2026

This list includes all known individuals to have reached the age of 60 years or more. The average lifespan of a chimpanzee is 40–50 years. 1 January will be given as the birthday to any individual whose exact birthdate isn't known, in accordance with international studbook procedure.

Joao, aged 83 years, 316 days, is the oldest chimpanzee ever, the oldest male chimpanzee ever, and the current oldest living chimpanzee. The oldest female chimpanzee ever was Little Mama, who reached to the final age of 80 years, 317 days. The oldest living female chimpanzee is Sheila, aged 78 years, 310 days.

Rank	Name	Sex	Birth date	Death date	Age ^{[†]}	Place of death or residence
1	Joao	M	1 January 1943	Living	83 years, 316 days	South Africa, Chimp Eden
2	Cheetah-Mike	M	1 January 1931	24 December 2011	80 years, 357 days	United States, Suncoast Primate Sanctuary
3	Little Mama	F	1 January 1937	14 November 2017	80 years, 317 days	United States, Lion Country Safari
4	Sheila	F	7 January 1948	Living	78 years, 310 days	United States, Suncoast Primate Sanctuary
5	J. Fred Muggs	M	14 March 1952	Living	74 years, 244 days	United States, Citrus Park, Florida
6	Susie	F	c. June 1954	29 October 2025	71 years, 150 days	United States, Sunset Zoo
7	Fana	F	1951	September 2022	71 years	Guinea, Bossou Hills Reserve
8	Jhonny	M	1 January 1950	15 January 2019	69 years, 14 days	Japan, Kobe Oji Zoo
9	Marco	M	1 January 1959	8 July 2026	67 years, 188 days	United States, Center for Great Apes
10	Gregoire	M	1 January 1942	17 December 2008	66 years, 351 days	Republic of the Congo, Tchimpounga Sanctuary
11	Jacob	M	1 January 1960	Living	66 years, 316 days	United States, Chimp Haven
11	Jimmie	F	1 January 1960	Living	66 years, 316 days	Netherlands, Royal Burgers' Zoo
13	Julius	M	1 January 1960	24 February 2026	66 years, 54 days	United States, Chimp Haven
14	Cobby	M	1 January 1958	5 June 2021	63 years, 155 days	United States, San Francisco Zoo
15	Auntie Rose	F	c. 1944	Early 2007	c. 63 years	Uganda, Kibale National Park (oldest wild chimpanzee)
16	Mimi	F	1 January 1964	Living	62 years, 316 days	North Macedonia, Skopje Zoo
17	Ladybird	F	1 January 1960	18 May 2022	62 years, 137 days	United States, Chimp Haven
18	Cheeta	M	ca. 1960	9 May 2022	ca. 62 years	United States, C.H.E.E.T.A. Primate Sanctuary
19	Garbo/Grandma	F	10 December 1953	c. 15 November 2015	61 years, c. 340 days	United States, Chimp Haven
20	Spitter	F	1 July 1960	3 March 2022	61 years, 245 days	Australia, Taronga Zoo
21	Max	M	3 August 1964	Living	62 years, 102 days	Germany, Hanover Zoo
22	Betsy	F	1 January 1965	Living	61 years, 316 days	United States, Chimp Haven
23	Coco	F	2 April 1965	Living	61 years, 225 days	United Kingdom, Twycross Zoo
24	Ed	M	1 January 1966	Living	60 years, 316 days	United States, Chimp Haven
24	Toto	M	1 January 1966	Living	60 years, 316 days	United Kingdom, Wales Ape and Monkey Sanctuary
26	Jonny	M	April 1961	February 2022	60 years, 10 months	Germany, Saarbrücken Zoo
27	Janie	F	1 January 1953	11 October 2013	60 years, 283 days	New Zealand, Auckland Zoo
28	Jojo	M	28 June 1951	20 February 2012	60 years, 237 days	France, Parc de la Pépinière
29	Fifi	F	c. May 1947	19 July 2007	c. 60 years, 2 months	Australia, Taronga Zoo
30	Coco	F	c. 1952	2012	c. 60 years	United States, Oregon Zoo
31	Blossom	F	1950s	11 November 2017	"in her 60s"	United Kingdom, Blair Drummond Safari Park
32	Sarah Anne	F	c. August 1959	July 2019	59 years, 11 months	United States, Chimp Haven

== Gorillas ==
Deceased Living
†This list includes all known individuals to have reached the age of 50 years or more. The average lifespan of a gorilla is 35–40 years. The 1 January has been given as the birthday to any individual whose exact birthdate isn't known, in accordance with international studbook procedure.

The oldest female gorilla ever, oldest gorilla ever, oldest living female gorilla and oldest living gorilla overall is Fatou, aged 69 years, 316 days. The oldest male gorilla ever was Ozoum, who reached to the final age of 61 years, 24 days. The oldest living male gorilla is Guhonda, aged 55 years, 316 days.

Female gorillas, on average, live longer than their male counterparts. Out of the 72 individuals known to have reached 50 years of age, 50 were female and 22 were male; out of the 9 individuals known to have reached 60 years of age, 7 were female and 2 were male; no gorilla has verifiably reached the age of 70.

Rank	Name	Sex	Birth date	Death date	Age	Place of death or residence
1	Fatou	F	1 January 1957	Living	69 years, 316 days	Germany, Berlin Zoo
2	Helen	F	1 January 1958	14 October 2022	64 years, 286 days	United States, Louisville Zoo
3	Mimi	F	1 January 1963	Living	63 years, 316 days	Germany, Zoologisch-botanischer Garten Wilhelma
4	Trudy	F	1 January 1956	24 July 2019	63 years, 204 days	United States, Little Rock Zoo
5	Vila	F	1 January 1957	27 January 2018	61 years, 26 days	United States, San Diego Zoo Safari Park
6	Ozoum	M	1 January 1961	25 January 2022	61 years, 24 days	United States, Zoo Atlanta
7	Delilah	F	1 January 1963	24 January 2024	61 years, 23 days	Northern Ireland, Belfast Zoo
8	Lamydoc	M	1 January 1962	22 February 2022	60 years, 52 days	United States, Gladys Porter Zoo
9	Colo	F	22 December 1956	17 January 2017	60 years, 26 days	United States, Columbus Zoo
10	Choomba	F	1 January 1963	13 January 2022	59 years, 12 days	United States, Zoo Atlanta
11	Shamba	F	1 January 1959	27 October 2017	58 years, 299 days	United States, Zoo Atlanta
12	Goma	F	23 September 1959	7 June 2018	58 years, 257 days	Switzerland, Basel Zoo
13	Babydoll	F	1 January 1961	28 November 2018	57 years, 331 days	United Kingdom, Howletts Wild Animal Park
14	Kim	F	1 January 1969	Living	57 years, 316 days	Spain, Fuengirola Zoo
15	Nico	M	1 January 1962	7 January 2018	56 years, 6 days	United Kingdom, Longleat Safari Park
16	Bafia	F	1 January 1967	5 January 2023	56 years, 4 days	United Kingdom, Chessington Zoo
17	Babsi	F	1 January 1971	Living	55 years, 316 days	Russia, Moscow Zoo
17	Guhonda	M	1 January 1971	Living	55 years, 316 days	Rwanda, Volcanoes National Park
19	Jenny	F	1 January 1953	4 September 2008	55 years, 247 days	United States, Dallas Zoo
20	Fritz	M	1 January 1963	20 August 2018	55 years, 231 days	Germany, Nuremberg Zoo
21	Ramses I	M	12 April 1971	Living	55 years, 215 days	United States, Fort Worth Zoo
22	Massa	M	1 January 1930	30 December 1984	54 years, 364 days	United States, Philadelphia Zoo
23	Oki	F	1 January 1956	30 December 2010	54 years, 363 days	Japan, Higashiyama Zoo and Botanical Gardens
24	Femelle	F	1 January 1962	12 December 2016	54 years, 346 days	United States, Milwaukee County Zoo
25	Virunga	F	1 January 1970	26 November 2024	54 years, 330 days	France, La Vallée des Singes
26	Nene	F	1 January 1972	Living	54 years, 316 days	Japan, Higashiyama Zoo and Botanical Gardens
26	Kamba	F	1 January 1972	Living	54 years, 316 days	Czech Republic, Prague Zoo
26	Dalila	F	1 January 1972	Living	54 years, 316 days	Netherlands, GaiaZOO
26	Sidonie	F	1 January 1972	Living	54 years, 316 days	United Kingdom, Howletts Wild Animal Park
26	Undi	F	1 January 1972	Living	54 years, 316 days	Germany, Zoologisch-botanischer Garten Wilhelma
31	Mouila	F	1 January 1960	22 April 2014	54 years, 111 days	United Kingdom, Howletts Wild Animal Park
32	Ju Ju	F	1 January 1962	23 January 2016	54 years, 22 days	United Kingdom, Howletts Wild Animal Park
33	Kathi	F	1 January 1973	Living	53 years, 316 days	Germany, Hanover Zoo
33	Amani	F	1 January 1973	Living	53 years, 316 days	United States, Fort Worth Zoo
35	Gori	M	20 April 1973	Living	53 years, 207 days	Japan, Japan Monkey Centre
36	Mumbah	M	1 January 1965	18 May 2018	53 years, 137 days	United States, Columbus Zoo and Aquarium
37	Assumbo	M	15 July 1973	Living	53 years, 121 days	Germany, Zoologischer Garten Rostock
38	Mushie	F	1 January 1969	23 April 2022	53 years, 112 days	United Kingdom, Howletts Wild Animal Park
39	Mintha	F	1 January 1974	Living	52 years, 316 days	Netherlands, Apenheul Primate Park
40	Charles	M	1 January 1972	29 October 2024	52 years, 302 days	Canada, Toronto Zoo
41	Biddy	F	1 January 1973	23 September 2025	52 years, 265 days	United Kingdom, Twycross Zoo
42	Quarta	F	17 July 1968	18 March 2021	52 years, 244 days	Switzerland, Basel Zoo
43	Timmy	M	1 January 1959	2 August 2011	52 years, 213 days	United States, Louisville Zoo
44	Winston	M	1 January 1972	13 July 2024	52 years, 194 days	United States, San Diego Zoo
45	Julchen	F	1 January 1964	27 June 2016	52 years, 178 days	Germany, Frankfurt Zoo
46	Fredrika	F	5 June 1974	Living	52 years, 161 days	United States, Cleveland Metroparks Zoo
47	King	M	1 January 1969	13 April 2021	52 years, 102 days	United States, Monkey Jungle
48	Tony	M	8 August 1974	Living	52 years, 97 days	Ukraine, Kyiv Zoo
49	Katanga	F	1 January 1963	27 February 2015	52 years, 57 days	United States, Gladys Porter Zoo
50	Josephine	F	1 January 1965	18 January 2017	52 years, 17 days	United States, Miami Zoo
51	Pieko	F	1 January 1970	2 December 2021	51 years, 335 days	Japan, Ueno Zoo
52	Mandji	F	1 January 1975	Living	51 years, 316 days	Netherlands, Apenheul Primate Park
53	Pete	M	1 January 1967	5 November 2018	51 years, 308 days	United States, Woodland Park Zoo
54	Nille	F	1 January 1964	14 October 2015	51 years, 286 days	Denmark, Givskud Zoo
55	Yuska	F	1 January 1971	25 August 2022	51 years, 236 days	Australia, Melbourne Zoo
56	Matze	M	1 January 1957	13 August 2008	51 years, 225 days	Germany, Frankfurt Zoo
57	Kora	F	1 January 1955	8 July 2006	51 years, 188 days	France, Touroparc Zoo
58	Mac	M	1 January 1953	19 May 2004	51 years, 139 days	United States, Houston Zoo
59	Kishina	F	7 August 1972	12 September 2023	51 years, 36 days	United States, Busch Gardens Tampa
60	Pongi	F	1 January 1963	1 February 2014	51 years, 31 days	United States, Columbus Zoo and Aquarium
61	Zakula	F	1 January 1968	14 December 2018	50 years, 347 days	United States, Pittsburgh Zoo & PPG Aquarium
62	Demba	F	10 July 1970	21 May 2021	50 years, 315 days	United States, Louisville Zoo
63	Gorgeous	F	1 January 1949	9 October 1999	50 years, 281 days	United States, Hogle Zoo
64	Gigi	F	1 January 1959	17 September 2009	50 years, 259 days	Germany, Berlin Zoo
65	Ivan	M	1 January 1962	21 August 2012	50 years, 233 days	United States, Zoo Atlanta
66	Machi	F	1 March 1976	15 September 2026	50 years, 198 days	United States, Atlanta Zoo
67	Ruhondeza	M	1 January 1962	27 June 2012	50 years, 178 days	Uganda, Kyumbugushu village
68	Amanda	F	1 January 1970	27 May 2020	50 years, 147 days	United States, Woodland Park Zoo
69	Schorsch	M	3 March 1972	22 June 2022	50 years, 113 days	Spain, Loro Parque
70	Ramar	M	1 January 1968	12 April 2018	50 years, 101 days	United States, Brookfield Zoo
71	Samantha	F	31 January 1970	29 March 2020	50 years, 58 days	United States, Cincinnati Zoo & Botanical Gardens
72	Kathryn	F	1 January 1963	19 February 2013	50 years, 49 days	United States, Oklahoma City Zoo and Botanical Garden

== Orangutans ==
Deceased Living
†This list includes all known individuals to have reached the age of 50 years or more. The average lifespan of an orangutan is 30–40 years. The 1 January will be given as the birthday to any individual whose exact birthdate isn't known, in accordance with international studbook procedure.

The oldest female orangutan ever, oldest orangutan ever, oldest living female orangutan and oldest living orangutan is Bella, aged 65 years, 316 days. The oldest male orangutan ever was Guas, who reached to the final age of 58 years, 39 days. The oldest living male orangutan is Que, aged 57 years, 316 days.

Female orangutans, on average, live longer than their male counterparts. Out of the 68 individuals known to have reached 50 years of age, 51 were female and 17 were male; all of the 7 individuals known to have reached 60 years of age were females; no orangutan has verifiably reached the age of 70.

Rank	Name	Sex	Birth date	Death date	Age	Place of death or residence
1	Bella	F	1 January 1961	Living	65 years, 316 days	Germany, Tierpark Hagenbeck
2	Kasih	F	19 March 1962	Living	64 years, 239 days	Germany, ZOOM Erlebniswelt Gelsenkirchen
3	Gypsy	F	1 January 1955	27 September 2017	62 years, 269 days	Japan, Tama Zoological Park
4	Puan	F	1 January 1956	17 June 2018	62 years, 167 days	Australia, Perth Zoo
5	Inji	F	1 December 1959	9 January 2021	61 years, 39 days	United States, Oregon Zoo
6	Mota	F	1 January 1965	21 October 2025	60 years, 293 days	Austria, Vienna Zoo
7	Jurry	F	6 May 1965	19 August 2025	60 years, 105 days	Japan, Tama Zoological Park
8	Puppe	F	1 January 1967	Living	59 years, 316 days	Canada, Toronto Zoo
9	Djambi	F	1 January 1958	3 September 2017	59 years, 245 days	Germany, Frankfurt Zoo
10	Molly	F	1 January 1952	30 April 2011	59 years, 119 days	Japan, Tama Zoological Park
11	Elsi	F	1 January 1958	23 January 2017	59 years, 22 days	Germany, ZOOM Erlebniswelt Gelsenkirchen
12	Martha	F	1 January 1965	17 January 2024	59 years, 16 days	United Kingdom, Chester Zoo
13	Guas	M	1 January 1919	9 February 1977	58 years, 39 days	United States, Philadelphia Zoo
14	Eloise	F	10 November 1968	Living	58 years, 3 days	United States, Los Angeles Zoo
15	Nénette	F	1 January 1969	Living	57 years, 316 days	France, Ménagerie du Jardin des plantes
15	Que	M	1 January 1969	Living	57 years, 316 days	Japan, Tama Zoological Park
17	Charly	M	1 January 1957	15 October 2014	57 years, 287 days	Germany, Frankfurt Zoo
18	Manis	F	28 March 1969	Living	57 years, 230 days	France, Zoo de La Boissière-du-Doré
19	Merah	F	13 May 1969	Living	57 years, 184 days	United States, St. Louis Zoo
20	Tia	F	1 January 1957	3 June 2014	57 years, 153 days	United States, Sedgwick County Zoo
21	Djaka	F	9 August 1969	Living	57 years, 96 days	Germany, Dresden Zoo
22	Guarina	F	1 January 1919	16 January 1976	57 years, 15 days	United States, Philadelphia Zoo
23	Ginger	F	1 January 1955	18 October 2011	56 years, 290 days	United States, Sacramento Zoo
24	Ferdinand	M	5 October 1969	5 April 2024	57 years, 39 days	Czech Republic, Ústí nad Labem Zoo
25	Mushon	M	23 December 1968	1 June 2025	56 years, 160 days	Israel, Ramat Gan Safari
26	Neo	F	5 March 1970	14 March 2024	56 years, 253 days	Japan, Higashiyama Zoo and Botanical Gardens
27	Muka	F	13 April 1970	Living	56 years, 214 days	Japan, Hamamatsu Municipal Zoo
28	Petronilla	F	21 May 1970	Living	56 years, 176 days	Italy, Giardino Zoologico
29	Puteri	F	12 June 1970	Living	56 years, 154 days	Australia, Perth Zoo
30	Sari	F	26 July 1970	Living	56 years, 110 days	Belgium, Pairi Daiza
31	Nonja	F	1 January 1952	29 December 2007	55 years, 362 days	United States, Zoo Miami
32	Popi	F	23 April 1971	Living	55 years, 204 days	United States, Center for Great Apes
33	Buschi	M	21 December 1971	Living	54 years, 327 days	Germany, Osnabrück Zoo
34	Maggie	F	18 July 1961	20 May 2016	54 years, 307 days	United States, Brookfield Zoo
35	Cheli	F	22 January 1972	Living	54 years, 295 days	United States, Sacramento Zoo
36	Schubbi	M	28 May 1972	Living	54 years, 169 days	Germany, ZOOM Erlebniswelt Gelsenkirchen
37	Janey	F	1 January 1962	8 June 2016	54 years, 159 days	United States, San Diego Zoo
38	Sexta	F	21 September 1972	Living	54 years, 53 days	Germany, ZOOM Erlebniswelt Gelsenkirchen
39	Mimi	M	1 January 1969	14 December 2022	53 years, 347 days	Japan, Fukuoka Zoo
40	Suma II	F	1 January 1953	21 September 2006	53 years, 263 days	Germany, Osnabrück Zoo
41	Chappy	F	26 February 1973	Living	53 years, 260 days	Japan, Tama Zoological Park
42	Lucy	F	2 March 1973	Living	53 years, 256 days	United States, National Zoological Park
43	Radja	M	1 January 1963	31 August 2016	53 years, 243 days	Netherlands, Apenheul Primate Park
44	Djudi	F	29 August 1973	Living	53 years, 76 days	Germany, Dresden Zoo
45	P.T.	F	13 September 1973	Living	53 years, 61 days	United States, Fort Worth Zoo
46	Karolinchen	F	8 December 1973	Living	52 years, 340 days	Belgium, Planckendael
47	Cheyenne	F	13 May 1972	9 February 2025	52 years, 272 days	United States, Houston Zoo
48	Biji	F	18 October 1970	11 August 2023	52 years, 266 days	United States, Zoo Atlanta
49	Toba	F	2 July 1967	11 January 2020	52 years, 193 days	United States, Oklahoma City Zoo
50	Duchess	F	1 January 1960	24 June 2012	52 years, 175 days	United States, Phoenix Zoo
51	Dumplin	F	21 July 1974	Living	52 years, 115 days	United States, Columbus Zoo
52	Susie	F	1 January 1964	16 April 2016	52 years, 106 days	United States, Gladys Porter Zoo
53	Buschi	M	1 January 1959	21 January 2011	52 years, 20 days	Germany, Wilhelma
54	Chinta	F	19 February 1968	18 February 2020	51 years, 364 days	United States, Woodland Park Zoo
55	Julia	F	1 January 1941	6 November 1992	51 years, 310 days	Netherlands, Diergaarde Blijdorp
56	Siam	M	1 January 1960	13 April 2011	51 years, 102 days	Germany, Duisburg Zoo
57	Karl	M	1 January 1961	20 March 2012	51 years, 79 days	Netherlands, Apenheul Primate Park
58	Chantek	F	30 August 1975	Living	51 years, 75 days	United States, Fort Worth Zoo
59	Sandra	F	1 November 1956	17 December 2007	51 years, 46 days	United States, Cheyenne Mountain Zoo
60	Major	M	1 January 1962	26 September 2012	50 years, 269 days	France, Zoo de La Boissière-du-Doré
61	Gina	F	1 January 1964	14 August 2014	50 years, 225 days	Jersey, Jersey Zoo
62	Telok	M	1 January 1963	12 August 2013	50 years, 223 days	Germany, Krefeld Zoo
63	Dinding	M	1 January 1958	5 July 2008	50 years, 186 days	Canada, Toronto Zoo
64	Rajang	M	14 June 1968	12 December 2018	50 years, 181 days	United Kingdom, Colchester Zoo
65	Jill	F	25 May 1976	Living	50 years, 172 days	United States, Kansas City Zoo & Aquarium
66	Tondelayo	F	1 January 1959	20 March 2009	50 years, 78 days	United States, ZooWorld
67	Babu	F	1 January 1952	15 February 2002	50 years, 45 days	Germany, Berlin Zoo
68	Baran	M	1 January 1962	12 February 2012	50 years, 42 days	Japan, Higashiyama Zoo and Botanical Gardens
