= Warchoł =

Warchoł is a Polish surname originated from the nickname with the literal meaning of a troublemaker. The term is historically associated with warchołstwo, a historical phenomenon describing unruly and rebellious behavior among the Polish nobility in the Polish–Lithuanian Commonwealth. Variations of the surname include: Varchol, Varhol, Warchol, Warhol, Warchał, Warhola, Warchoła, Warchała, etc.

Notable people with the surname include:

- Andy Warhol (1928–1987), American artist, film director, and producer
- Bartosz Warchoł (born 1992), Polish cyclist
- Damian Warchoł (born 1995), Polish footballer
- Michael Varhol, American screenwriter
- Bohdan Warchal (1930–2000), Slovak violinist
- Ryan Warchol (born 1991), Australian celebrity and bonds model
