= Alfred the Gorilla =

Bristol Zoo (1928–1948)

Alfred
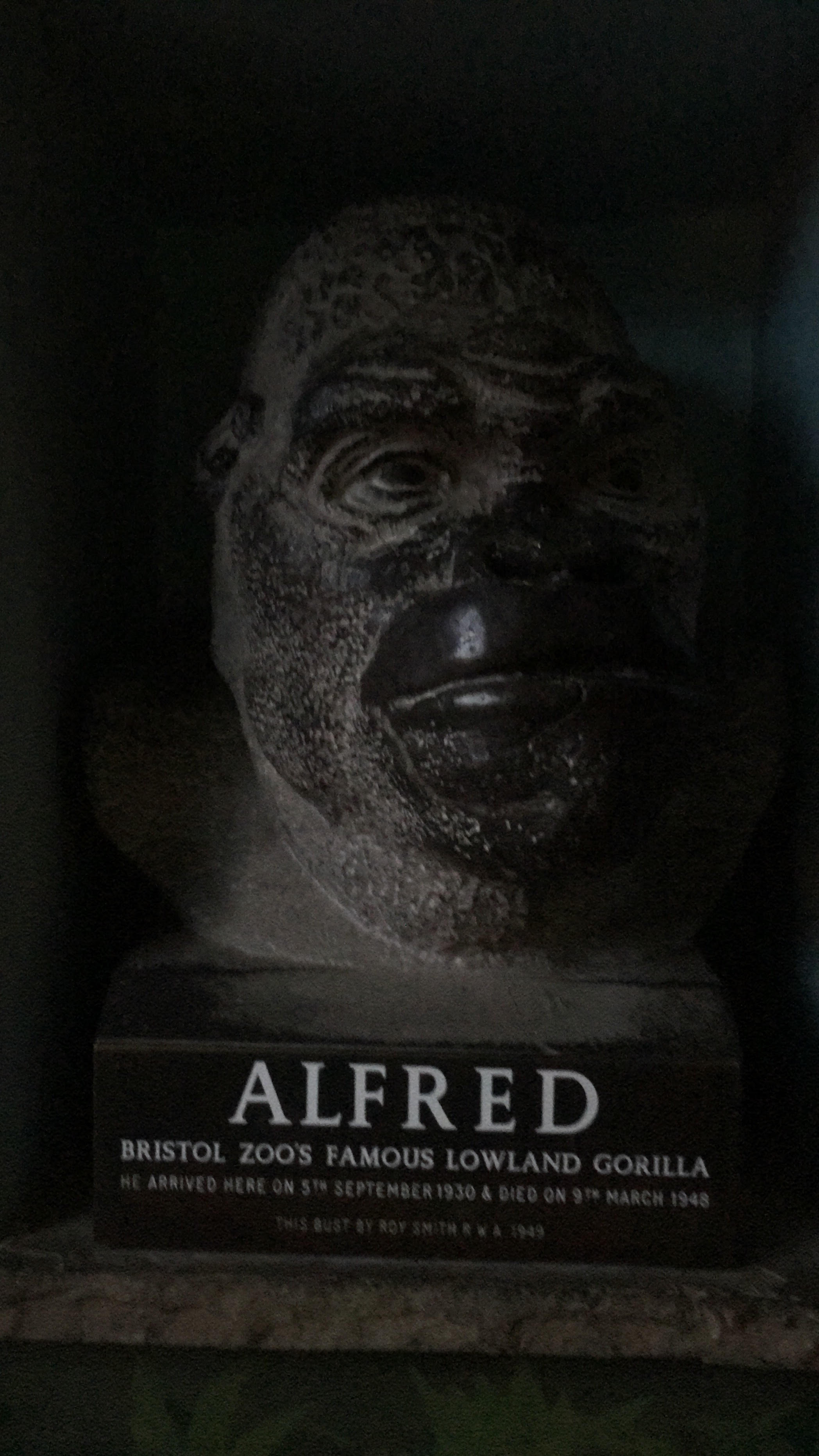
- The remembrance sculpture of Alfred
- Species: Silverback lowland gorilla
- Sex: Male
- Born: c. 1928
- Died: 10 March 1948 (aged 19–20); Bristol Zoo, England
- Cause of death: Tuberculosis
- Residence: Bristol Zoo, England
- Weight: 368 lb (167 kg)
- Named after: Alfred Mosely

Alfred the Gorilla (c. 1928 – 10 March 1948) arrived at Bristol Zoo, England, in 1930 and became a popular attraction and animal celebrity. His fame grew to international proportions during World War II and after his death he remained an important mascot for the city of Bristol.

Alfred's distinct personality led to his popularity among younger visitors and he quickly became one of the zoo's main attractions. His profile was further increased during World War II when visiting soldiers took images and stories of Alfred back to their home countries with articles about him appearing in the US and Australian press. After Alfred died in 1948, his taxidermic form was put on display in Bristol City Museum and Art Gallery where he continued to act as a mascot for the city. Alfred's form was stolen from the museum in 1956 and was missing for a weekend before he was discovered and returned, a mystery that remained unsolved until the death of one of the perpetrators in 2010. Many people to this day still remember him. Bristol zoo still remembers him after almost 75 years. He remains on display in Bristol today and served as inspiration for the popular Wow! Gorillas trail in 2012.

== Gorillas and Bristol ==
Bristol's connection with gorillas dates back to the first gorilla bones ever brought to Britain. After being sent to Liberia as a missionary in 1836, the American naturalist Dr. Thomas Savage wrote to Professor Richard Owen in London, declaring,

'I have found the existence of an animal of extraordinary character in this locality, and which I have reason to believe is unknown to the naturalist. As yet I have been unable to obtain more than a part of a skeleton.'

The letter included a sketch of a skull which Savage speculated might be related to a chimpanzee. Savage also wrote to Samuel Stutchbury of the Bristol Institution, a forerunner of the Bristol Museum and Art Gallery. Stutchbury had more remains sought out and in 1847 Captain George Wagstaff obtained three skulls from the Gabon River in West Africa. When these arrived in Bristol, Stutchbury sent them to Owen who published a paper, on the specimens proposing to call the species Troglodytes Savagei after Thomas Savage. By the time the full paper was published in 1849, however, Dr. Jeffries Wyman of Harvard had already published a description of the bones with Savage's own preferred name of Troglodytes gorilla. The skulls were returned to Stutchbury and can be found in Bristol Museum's collection today.

The first living gorilla reached Europe in the 1880s, although a ‘very unusual chimpanzee’ exhibited by a travelling showman in England in 1860 was later thought to be gorilla. Most of the early gorillas sent to Europe died within a couple of years, often from lung disease. One of the longest lived resided at Breslau Zoo and reached the age of seven. The first living gorilla to reach Bristol Zoo, purchased for £75, arrived in 1900 but died after a short period.

== Early life ==
Alfred was initially found by an Expedition from the American Museum of Natural History, New York and Columbia University in 1928 in what was then Belgian Congo. The expedition members were told that a pair of gorillas had been shot for ‘raiding’ a farmer's field for food, afterwards a baby was discovered and suckled by a local woman. The baby gorilla was later sold to a Greek merchant and taken to the town of Mbalmayo in modern-day Cameroon, where the expedition encountered him playing in the streets. He was described by the Expedition as ‘the liveliest specimen of his kind we had ever seen’.

In 1930, Alfred was sold to an Italian who, after bringing him to Europe, sold him on to an animal dealer. Bristol Zoo, already successful in rearing chimpanzees, acquired Alfred for £350. Alfred spent a few months housed in Rotterdam in 1930 before continuing to Bristol Zoo. Alfred was named after Alfred Mosely, Companion of Honour, a benefactor of the zoo, it was his gift to the Nation Although during his life he was thought to be a mountain gorilla, it is more likely that he was a western lowland gorilla.

== Life at Bristol Zoo ==
Alfred arrived at Bristol Zoo on 5 September 1930, which was thereafter celebrated as his birthday. His cage was positioned just inside one of the entrances and this prominent position, alongside his vibrant personality, meant that he quickly became one of the Zoo's main attractions. During his first two years at the zoo, Alfred regularly took walks around the grounds with his keeper Frank Guise. He did this on the end of a long collar and chain and was well known for wearing woollen jumpers.

During his third year at the zoo, Alfred had grown to weigh eight stones. His increasing strength had become a concern to his keepers; when he broke a photographer's tripod during his birthday celebrations, his walks around the zoo were curtailed. Alfred also caught whooping cough during these early years but received medical help. This remained the only significant illness that he contracted until the end of his life.

Despite being confined to his enclosure, Alfred continued to be a popular attraction. Alfred was featured beating his breast on a radio broadcast from the zoo in 1937. He became the oldest gorilla to survive in captivity in 1938; later that year, visitors were invited to guess his weight on a specially constructed machine. The closest guess the public managed was 20 stones, with Alfred actually coming in at 26 stones, four pounds. His diet was completely vegetarian, which was an innovation in the practice of keeping captive gorillas. It also cost the zoo just £3 a week.

== Popularity, habits and personality ==
Alfred's status at the zoo led to him becoming something of a local celebrity with visitors, especially with children. Their recollections often refer to Alfred as having a number of distinct character traits and quirks that made up his personality. On occasion he would approach the children who stood around his cage and make what they perceived as friendly gestures and conversations with them.

=== Popularity ===
Although Alfred's habits could occasionally be perceived as offensive by some of the zoo's visitors, many of the children who saw him regularly formed a deep bond with him. One visitor even going as far as to say that because of Alfred's ruder habits, he both ‘loved and hated him’ at the same time. Others recall simply enjoying the gorilla's company and would sit beside the cage for hours just to be close to him. His status as one of the zoo's main attractions is reflected by the fact that many of them recall that rather than ‘going to the zoo’, they would often think of their visits as ‘going to see Alfie’.

Other visitors made regular trips to the zoo on their way through Bristol to other destinations. One woman from the West Midlands recalls that they would drop in on the gorilla every year on their way to a campsite in Somerset. She also notes Alfred's habit of wearing a large hessian sack like a holiday maker wearing a handkerchief on their head which always amused her.

=== Temperament and nickname ===
Alfred was allegedly offended by Rosie the Elephant being allowed to walk past his enclosure which would cause him to sulk. He also allegedly harboured a dislike of bearded men, double decker buses and aeroplanes. This stood in contrast for the affection he reciprocated towards his early keepers Frank Guise and Bert Jones, as well as to the sparrows who visited his enclosure to pick at breadcrumbs. He would sometimes be tickled by his keeper and a crowd would gather to watch. As fascism rose in Europe Alfred acquired the nickname, the ‘Dictator of Bristol Zoo’.

=== Habits ===
Alfred was also fond of making and throwing snowballs. At the age of three years he can be seen doing just that in the company of two young children in a photo from January 1931. His expertise at throwing however, was not limited to snowballs. Alfred, one visitor recalled, 'used to express his opinion of the human race by picking up large lumps of his droppings and hurling them accurately at the spectators in front of his cage. It was a delight for small schoolboys to be able to act as cheerleaders to this somewhat one-sided contest’. Alfred also had a habit of urinating on visitors after climbing the bars of his cage. One child was beckoned over by the gorilla and when she approached he urinated on her head, the story is still remembered by her grandchildren today who often ask to see the gorilla who ‘did a wee on great grandma’ when they visit the museum. Another writer described how Alfred was her favourite animal at the zoo and she has many memories but her favourite is of her aunt eating plums in front of Alfred. He kept asking her for some and when she simply laughed at him he went to the back of his cage and threw his dung at her. She continued to laugh and not feed him so he climbed the bars of his cage and urinated on her. The writer got in trouble for telling her aunt that the incident was her fault and she should have given Alfred the plums. Alfred was also fond of playing hide and seek with visitors. One visitor recalled how she once got her head stuck in the bars of Alfred's cage when she was ten. She was later rescued by a St. Johns ambulance worker. ‘How did Alfred react to my dilemma’, she recounted, ‘he just sat in the corner of his cage clapping his hands loudly and laughing’. She now tells the story to her grandchildren when they visit the zoo.

== Wartime ==
Although some animals were moved from the zoo during the war years, Alfred remained in Bristol. His diet of fruit and vegetables became stretched however, and the zoo took to seeking sponsors in order to feed its animals. Alfred was sponsored by Albert Glisten, Fellow of the Zoological Society and Chairman of Southend United Football Club. The presence of US Army troops in Bristol allowed Alfred's popularity to spread further as soldiers sent images and stories featuring the gorilla across the Atlantic. Articles concerning Alfred were reproduced in American newspapers and he retained his celebrity status throughout the war. One visitor to the museum recalled that her late great-great-uncle Bill was Alfred's keeper in the 1940s. Alfred was fond of Bill and would comb his keeper's hair and eat chocolate from his teeth. Bill would occasionally be picked up and taken to the zoo on his days off as Alfred would sometimes not go into his night cage without him. She also noted the gorilla's dislike of bombs and anti aircraft guns.

The Home Guard of the 11th Battalion, Gloucestershire Regiment was based in the zoo's cafeteria during World War Two. One member based at the zoo recalled how they were not allowed to march and parade in front of Alfred's cage lest he become aggressive. At the time the troops discussed the causes of this, musing that it might be that their uniforms reminded Alfred of other primates. On reflection, as the keepers also wore uniforms, the writer concluded that it was more likely the marching itself which upset the gorilla. He also recalled how night watch at the zoo was his scariest experience during his time in the Home Guard. On the one hand, he was worried about Germans appearing out of the dark but he was equally concerned that if a bomb dropped near the zoo the animals might escape from their cages. ‘Often, 17 year olds like myself exchanged our fears about what one would do if, spare the thought, in such an event the monstrous form of Alfred were to lumber forward out of the darkness’, he recalled, ‘probably run towards the enemy!’ he concluded.

== Death ==
In 1946 Alfred became sluggish and overweight before being diagnosed with thyroid deficiency. He recovered from the illness after treatment however, and later returned to his former strength.

Alfred died on 10 March 1948. The press at the time speculated that ‘his pet hate got him in the end’, linking Alfred's dislike of aeroplanes with the passage of one over the zoo shortly before his death. The actual cause of his demise was tuberculosis which he contracted a year before and despite his keepers best efforts, he had been unable to recover. His death was mourned by many of the regular visitors to the zoo, some of whom were even inspired to compose poems in his honour.

After Alfred's death gorillas were kept almost continuously at the zoo until the mid-1990s. An article in the Western Daily Press noted the departure of two gorillas in 1995 breaking this pattern of keeping gorillas at the zoo. The departing gorillas were named Diana and Jeremy, aged 23 and 12 respectively. They were sent to London Zoo to live with another female named Zaire. The author noted that the conditions in Bristol's ape house had been criticised, prompting a £5 million redevelopment of the building in order for it to house small animals. A new ape house, the article declared, was not likely to appear for at least four years and the gorillas were unlikely to return, much to the disappointment of the keeper Mike Colbourne.

== Taxidermy ==
Following his death Alfred was mounted by the taxidermists Rowland Ward of London in a pose representing him on all fours. He was returned to Bristol City Museum and was put on display near the heavily frequented museum cafe. His bones and organs were sent to the Anatomy Department at Bristol University.

== Display ==
At first, Alfred's interpretation in the museum was very minimal, detailing only a few key pieces of information about the gorilla. Despite this, his position near the cafe, combined with the fame he had been accorded during his life, made him one of the most visited and celebrated exhibits. Many of those who saw Alfred in the zoo as children continued to visit him once he became an exhibit in the museum. The feelings that they had for him when he was alive often carried over into his second ‘life’ as an exhibit, maintaining and sustaining his fame. Later encounters with his taxidermic form were particularly memorable for those who could remember Alfred from his time at the zoo. One visitor, for example, encountered the gorilla unexpectedly when visiting her granddaughter at Bristol University more than forty years after Alfred's demise.

Alfred was moved in 1988 to the World Wildlife gallery on the museum's first floor where his exhibit was now positioned alongside a number of different specimens and displays. His interpretation was expanded during this move and he began to appear more and more on publicity material for the museum in photographs as well as in cartoon form. These moves allowed Alfred's form to become a part of a larger narrative on biology and conservation whilst retaining his status as a celebrated local mascot and historical object.

== Theft ==
In 1956 Alfred went missing from the museum after being stolen by a group of students as a prank. After three days he was found and returned to his case although the full story surrounding the theft took more than fifty years to come to light.

== Celebrations and competitions ==
In 1993 people were asked to send in their memories about Alfred as part of a competition to win four free tickets to Bristol Zoo. This was part of the celebrations held to mark the fiftieth anniversary of Alfred's death which also included a series of talks and tours at the museum. The letters that were received added a great deal of anecdotal information about Alfred to the museum's archive

Alfred's eightieth birthday was celebrated at the museum in 2010 with a series of activities and events. Children drew him birthday cards showing the gorilla's continuing public appeal as part of the history of Bristol and as a curiosity for younger visitors to the museum. A bust of Alfred's head is also on display at Bristol's M Shed museum after formerly being displayed at the entrance to the gorilla enclosure at Bristol Zoo.

== Legacy ==
Alfred remains a prominent figure in the museum's collection appearing regularly in guides, trails and children's events. Alfred has also featured in several films and plays. Tom Kelpie's award-winning short film spoof Who Stuffed Alfred the Gorilla as well as the original footage filmed by the American exhibition who first discover him playing the streets of Mbalmayo. Nick Jones and Toby Lucas also made a short documentary on Alfred in 2008.

Alfred featured in Peter Nichols’ 1979 light comedy Born in the Gardens. One of Alfred's kidnappers, Ron Morgan, also allegedly wrote a play about the incident.

Alfred's life and status are also often still used to promote discussion regarding the history and evolution of conservation techniques and the practice of keeping primates in captivity.

Alfred's status as a mascot for Bristol was further cemented in 2011 when the Wow! Gorillas project was launched across the city to raise awareness about the extinction crisis facing primates. The project was also held to mark the 175th anniversary of Bristol Zoo and raised over £420,000 for charity.

== See also ==
- List of individual apes
