= Trudy (gorilla) =

Western lowland gorilla in Arkansas, USA

- Species: western lowland gorilla
- Sex: female
- Born: 1956
- Died: July 24, 2019 (aged 62–63)

Trudy (1956 - 24 July 2019) was a western lowland gorilla residing in Little Rock, Arkansas, in the United States. She was estimated to have been born in 1956 or 1957 in the wild. Following the death of Colo in January 2017, she was the oldest known living gorilla in the world (together with German gorilla Fatou), reaching 63 years of age. She died the night of July 24, 2019.

Preceded by Colo	World's oldest living Gorilla; January 17, 2017 — July 24, 2019	Succeeded by Fatou
