= Jenny (gorilla) =

Lowland gorilla at the Dallas Zoo

- Species: Western lowland gorilla (Gorilla gorilla gorilla)
- Sex: Female
- Born: c. 1953
- Died: September 4, 2008 (aged 54–55); Dallas Zoo, Dallas, Texas
- Cause of death: Euthanasia
- Known for: Oldest captive gorilla in the world at the time of her death
- Residence: Dallas Zoo, Dallas, Texas
- Offspring: 1
- Weight: 218 lb (99 kg)

Jenny (c. 1953 - September 4, 2008) was a western lowland gorilla who resided at the Dallas Zoo in Dallas, Texas. Jenny was the world's oldest gorilla in captivity at the time of her death in 2008 at the age of 55. Jenny was confirmed to be the oldest living gorilla in the world by Species360 earlier in 2008.

Jenny was born in the wild, so her exact date of birth is unknown. She was acquired by the Dallas Zoo in 1957, where she lived for the rest of her life. Jenny gave birth to a daughter, Vicki, in 1965, but failed to conceive again. As a result, Jenny became part of an American study on the effects of menopause on gorillas. Jenny's daughter, Vicki, was transferred to a zoo in Alberta, Canada, when she was five years old.

The Dallas Zoo celebrated Jenny's 55th birthday in May 2008 with a celebration and frozen fruit birthday cake.

She remained in relatively good health throughout her life, weighing 218 pounds (99 kilograms). However, Jenny was diagnosed with an inoperable stomach tumor during the last few weeks of her life. She had stopped eating and drinking. Jenny was euthanized as a "quality-of-life decision" at the Dallas Zoo on September 4, 2008, at the age of 55.

Colo, a gorilla who was kept at the Columbus Zoo and Aquarium and was the first gorilla ever born in captivity, succeeded Jenny as the world's oldest known gorilla. Colo died January 17, 2017, at the age of 60.

A gorilla's normal life expectancy in the wild is approximately 30 to 35 years.

== See also ==
- List of individual apes

Preceded by Massa	World's oldest living Gorilla; 2008 – September 4, 2008	Succeeded by Colo
