= Colo (gorilla) =

Western lowland gorilla

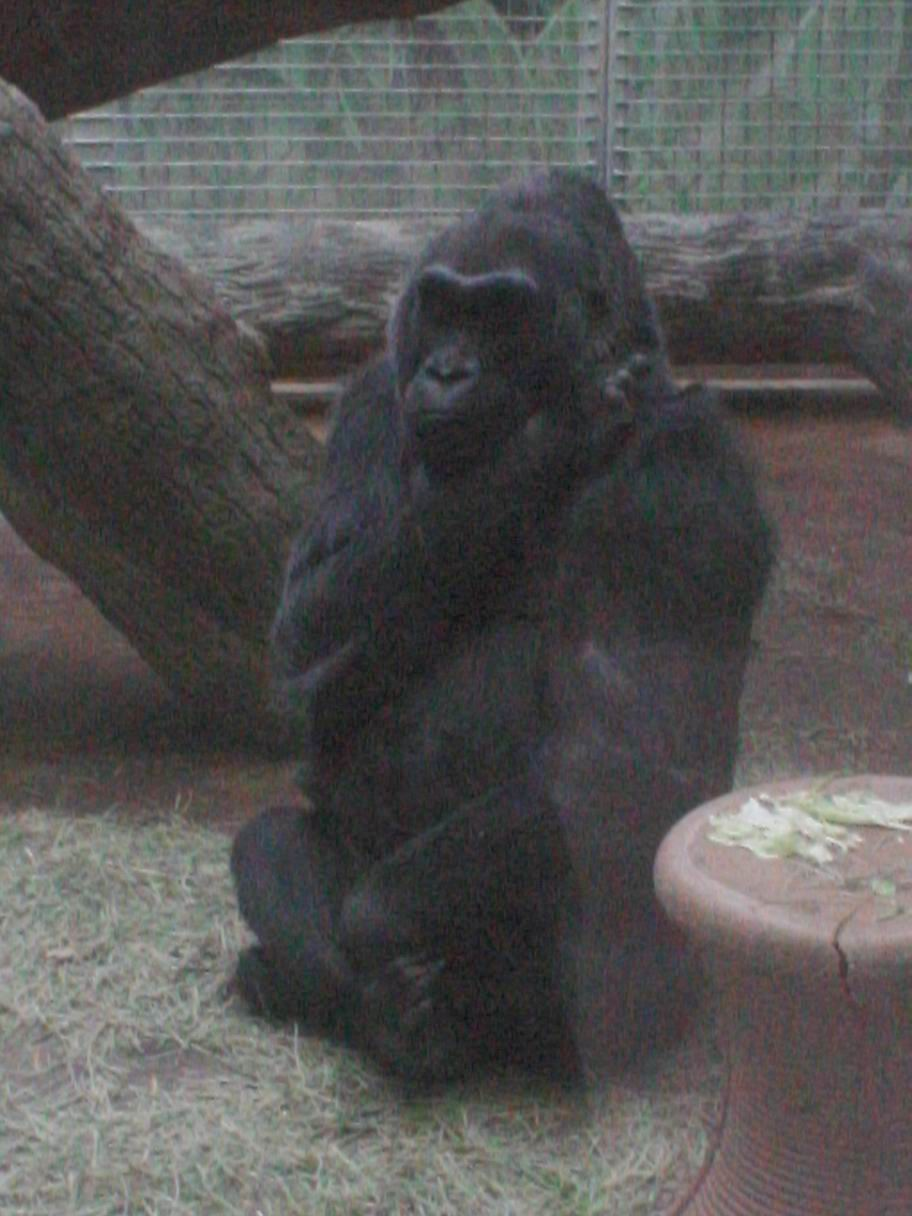
- Colo, photographed March 5, 2009
- Species: Western lowland gorilla (Gorilla gorilla gorilla)
- Sex: Female
- Born: December 22, 1956; Columbus Zoo and Aquarium, Powell in Liberty Township, Delaware County, Ohio, U.S.
- Died: January 17, 2017 (aged 60); Columbus Zoo and Aquarium, Powell in Liberty Township, Delaware County, Ohio, U.S.
- Known for: First gorilla born in captivity and oldest gorilla in captivity
- web.archive.org/web/20181212131459/http://www.columbuszoo.org/home/animals/meet-our-animals/colomemorial

Colo (December 22, 1956 – January 17, 2017) was a western gorilla widely known as the first gorilla to be born in captivity anywhere in the world and the oldest known gorilla in the world in 2017. Colo was born at the Columbus Zoo and Aquarium to Millie Christina (mother) and Baron Macombo (father), and lived there for her entire life. She was briefly called "Cuddles" before a contest was held to officially name her. (Mrs. Howard Brannon of Zanesville, Ohio, won the contest.) Colo's name was derived from the place of her birth, Columbus, Ohio.

== Life ==
The Columbus Zoo first introduced gorillas in 1951. It was in 1956 that two gorillas first produced offspring in the zoo. The gorilla was named Colo, short for Columbus. After she was rejected at birth by her mother, zookeepers had to hand-raise Colo. They hand-raised her much like a human child, by dressing her in clothes and giving her bottles of formula. At the age of two years, Colo was introduced to a 19-month-old male from Africa called Bongo. Colo and Bongo had three offspring; Emmy on February 1, 1968, Oscar on July 18, 1969, and Toni on December 28, 1971.

On April 25, 1979, Columbus Zoo had its first third generation birth. The infant was named Cora, short for Central Ohio Rare Ape. On January 27, 1997, Colo's great-grandson Jantu was born. A birth at the Henry Doorly Zoo made Colo a great-great-grandmother in 2003. Although Colo did not raise any of her own offspring, she reared her twin grandsons, Macombo II and Mosuba, from birth. Colo also acted as a guardian for her grandson, named J.J. after "Jungle" Jack Hanna with whom he shares a birthday.

Colo was held at the Columbus Zoo and has been there longer than any other animal in the zoo's captive animal collection. Colo and her progeny, five of whom are still held at the Columbus Zoo, comprised about one-third of the Zoo's 17 captive gorillas as of 2015.

Colo became the oldest living gorilla in captivity following the death of 55-year-old Jenny in September 2008. Colo celebrated her 60th birthday on December 22, 2016. The Columbus Zoo announced that Colo died in her sleep on January 17, 2017.

== Genealogy ==
Colo was a mother to three, a grandmother to 16, a great-grandmother to 12, and a great-great-grandmother to three.

== See also ==
- Oldest apes#Gorillas
- List of individual apes

Preceded by	World's oldest living Gorilla — January 17, 2017	Succeeded by Trudy
