= Charles the Gorilla =

Animal at Toronto Zoo, Canada (1972–2024)

Charles
- Species: Western lowland gorilla (Gorilla gorilla gorilla)
- Sex: Male
- Born: c. September 23, 1972; Gabon
- Died: October 29, 2024 (aged 52); Toronto Zoo, Toronto, Ontario, Canada
- Cause of death: Heart Failure
- Known for: Silverback of a troop of gorillas for 30 years, visual artist
- Offspring: 11
- Named after: Charlie Brown

Charles the Gorilla (c. September 23, 1972 – October 29, 2024) was a wild-born western lowland gorilla from Gabon, West Africa who was notable for being the silverback of the Toronto Zoo's gorilla troop from September 1974 until his death in October 2024.

== Biography ==
=== Early life ===
Despite his approximate date of birth falling on September 23, 1972, it was celebrated on January 19 each year. At a young age, he was a lively and curious ape who grew into a strong, watchful guardian of his group. At a time when humans were less vigilant about their treatment of threatened and endangered species, Charles was sought after by a group of poachers interested in acquiring gorillas for international trade. At the time, gorilla infants could fetch a price of up to $5000. He is thought to have been found next to his mother's corpse.

=== Toronto Zoo ===
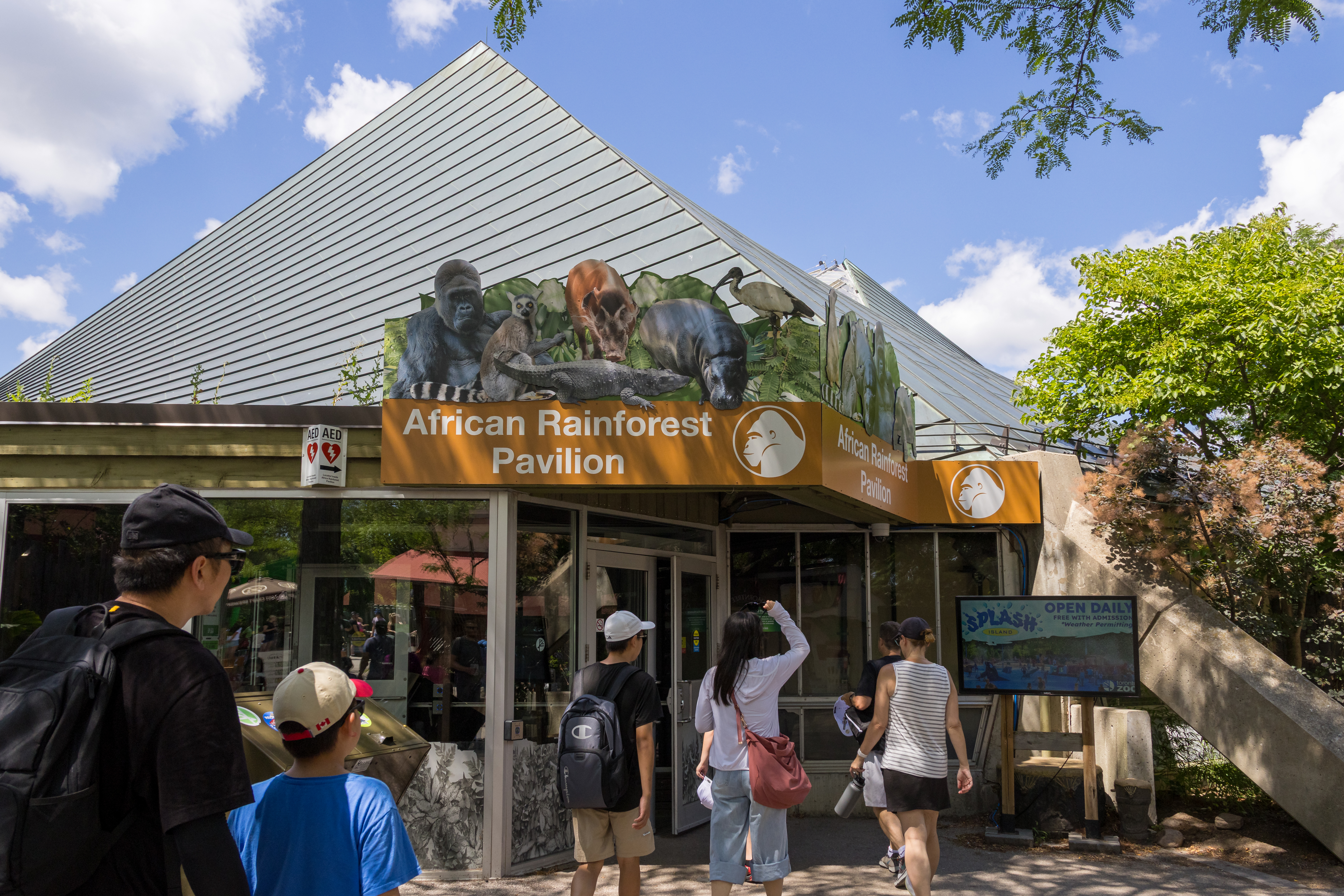
The sign outside of the African Rainforest Pavilion, featuring an image of Charles.

On September 24, 1974, Charles was sent to the Toronto Zoo, where he lived until his death. His name was given to him because his particularly round face reminded the staff at the zoo of Charlie Brown. When Charles was first brought to the zoo, he was considered rather unattractive because he was missing patches of hair and had lesions and sores on his body.

Charles, along with Amanda, Barney, Caroline, Josephine, Julia, and Samantha, were part of the Toronto Zoo's first acquisition of a group of wild-caught gorillas for the newly opened zoo. The Toronto Zoo opened its doors in August 1974 and since then some 33 million visitors have seen the zoo's gorillas (a figure which grew by about a million people each year). This group of seven gorillas has conceived over 33 children and are represented by more than 23 living offspring, comprising three generations. Charles sired eleven children, of which eight still survive today. He also had six grandchildren.

=== Offspring ===
In total, Charles sired 11 offspring. His daughter Sekani (born 1990) now lives in Arkansas at the Little Rock Zoo. His son Jomo (born 1991, died 2022) resided at the Cincinnati Zoo. Both Jomo and Sekani are parents to two boys. His third adult son Subira (born 1995, died 2020) resided at the Dallas Zoo. His daughter Johari (born May 12, 2001) lives at the Calgary Zoo. His daughter Shalia (born 2002) lives at the Milwaukee Zoo. He also has four younger offspring, Sadiki (male, born March 7, 2005), Nassir (male, born September 2, 2009), Nneka (female, born January 9, 2014), and Charlie (female, born June 7, 2018) who remain at the Toronto Zoo.

Another of Charles' offspring was sent to the Dallas Zoo where in March 2004, Jabari (born 1990) escaped his enclosure and injured 3 patrons. Jabari was supposedly thrown into a fit of rage by a group of youths that taunted him and, in an effort to exact his revenge, he climbed a 5.5-metre (18 feet) wall and ran amok in the visitors' viewing area while patrons fled in panic. After 45 minutes outside of his exhibit, the Dallas police were called in to control the situation. In what was reported as an attack on officers, Dallas police shot and killed Jabari before zoo staff could dart or subdue him.

=== Later life and death ===
On August 15, 2024, a bronze statue of Charles was unveiled outside his home of the zoo's African Rainforest pavilion to commemorate his long life as well as the Toronto Zoo's 50th anniversary.

On October 29, 2024, Charles died at the age of 52, with his keepers and his daughter, Johari, at his side. He had begun to exhibit signs of heart failure the week prior.

== Artwork ==
Charles was an accomplished painter. Although the group had always been exposed to the visual arts, Charles' niche for the medium sprang up as a result of behavioural enrichment during a turbulent time in the gorilla group's stay at the Toronto Zoo. During a period of time between 1990 and 1998, Charles (who grew into a well-sized Silverback male) was not interested in interacting with offspring that were not his own. And so in an effort to allow the gorilla group to meet with some of the zoo's other gorilla progeny (i.e., Barney's children), Charles spent a brief period of each day in solitude. In an effort to keep Charles contented during these intervals away from his harem, Charles was given access to large sheets of paper and non-toxic coloured paints. In an effort to raise funds for a new gorilla exhibit at the Toronto Zoo, some of these works were exhibited and sold at a private art gallery and were sold for $400 to $800 each which raised over $37,000 for the Toronto Zoo.

== See also ==
- List of individual apes
