= Warhola =

Warhola (Ukrainian: Вархола) is a Ukrainian surname meaning "quarrel".

Notable people with the surname include:

- Andy Warhol (1928–1987), born Andrew Warhola
- James Warhola (born 1955), nephew of Andy Warhol and American artist
- John Warhola (1925–2010), brother of Andy Warhol and museum founder
- Julia Warhola (1891–1972), mother of Andy Warhol

== See also ==
- Warchoł, related surname
