= Pierre Brassau =

Chimpanzee artist

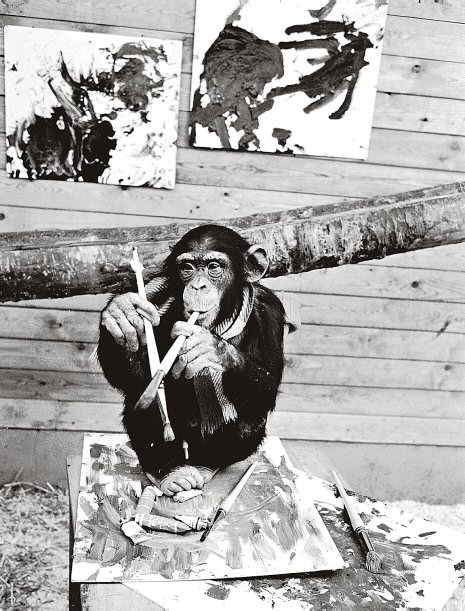
Apan Peter (alias "Pierre Brassau") in 1964

Peter, better known by his alias Pierre Brassau, was a chimpanzee and artist who was the subject of a 1964 hoax perpetrated by Åke "Dacke" Axelsson, a journalist at the Swedish tabloid Göteborgs-Tidningen. Axelsson came up with the idea of exhibiting a series of paintings made by a non-human primate, under the pretense that they were the work of a previously unknown French artist named "Pierre Brassau", to test whether critics could tell the difference between true avant-garde modern art and the work of a chimpanzee.

"Pierre Brassau" was Peter, a four-year-old common chimpanzee from Sweden's Borås Djurpark. Axelsson had persuaded Peter's 17-year-old keeper to give the chimpanzee a brush and paint. After Peter had created several paintings, Axelsson chose the best four and arranged to have them exhibited at the Gallerie Christinae in Gothenburg, Sweden.

While one critic prophetically observed that "only an ape could have done this", most praised the works. Rolf Anderberg of the Göteborgs-Posten wrote, "Brassau paints with powerful strokes, but also with clear determination. His brush strokes twist with furious fastidiousness. Pierre is an artist who performs with the delicacy of a ballet dancer." After the hoax was revealed, Anderberg insisted that Peter's work was "still the best painting in the exhibition". A private collector bought one of the works for US$90 (equivalent to $934 in 2025).

In 1969, Peter was transferred to Chester Zoo in England where he lived out the remainder of his life.

== See also ==
- Joachim-Raphaël Boronali
- List of individual apes
