= Joseph V. Brady =

Trainer of Ham the Astrochimp

Joseph Brady
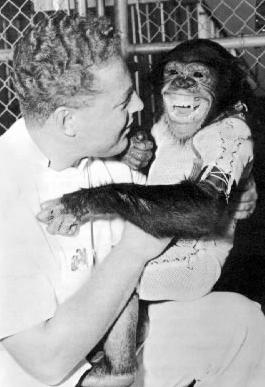
- Born: Joseph Vincent Brady; March 28, 1922; New York City, U.S.
- Died: July 29, 2011 (aged 89); Baltimore, Maryland, U.S.
- Occupations: Psychologist, neuroscientist
- Known for: Trainer of Ham, a pioneering space chimpanzee

Joseph Vincent Brady (March 28, 1922 – July 29, 2011) was an American psychologist, neuroscientist, and pioneer of behavioral pharmacology. In addition to his status as a founder of behavioral pharmacology, he made significant contributions in the areas of drug abuse and treatment, space exploration, and human research ethics.

== Early life and education ==
Brady was born in New York City in 1922 and attended school in the Catholic parochial school system in Brooklyn, New York. He began his undergraduate studies in 1940 at Fordham University, receiving a Bachelor of Science degree in 1943.

=== Military service ===
While at Fordham, Brady joined the Reserve Officers' Training Corps and following graduation, Brady attended officers' training school. Brady was commissioned as a Second Lieutenant and infantry platoon leader in the U.S. Army and served in World War II in the European Theater. At the close of the war, Brady was assigned to the 317th Station Hospital in Wiesbaden, Germany, a former Luftwaffe hospital that had been designated as the Neuropsychiatric Center of the European Command. There, despite having no training in psychology or psychiatry, Brady served as the Chief Clinical Psychologist for two and a half years, teaching himself how to conduct psychological assessments from German texts.

=== Graduate studies ===
Continuing his military service as a captain, Brady engaged in doctoral studies in the Department of Psychology at the University of Chicago under advisor Howard Hunt. Hunt was a former student of influential behaviorist B.F. Skinner at the University of Minnesota. Skinner and his functional analysis of behavior became an important influence on Brady, who used animal models throughout his career. Brady's dissertation research on conditioned emotional responses in rats demonstrated that conditioned anxiety responses could be eliminated through electroconvulsive shock and set the stage for later work on pharmacological agents such as reserpine that were emerging at the time as possible tools for psychiatric intervention. Brady received his doctorate in psychology in 1951.

== Career ==
=== Walter Reed Army Research Institute ===
Following his completion of the doctoral degree, Brady was assigned to the Walter Reed Army Medical Center in 1951, retaining his Army commission. Due to his background in animal model research, Brady was subsequently hired as the head of the newly established Department of Experimental Psychology in the Walter Reed Army Research Institute. With the ability to recruit talented scientists fulfilling their military service obligations to his laboratory, Brady established one of the first multidisciplinary physiological psychology (an early term for neuroscience) research programs in the country. Collaborators included behavior analysts such as Murray Sidman, Richard Herrnstein, and John Boren, neuroscientists Larry Stein, William Stebbins, Eliot Valenstein, Walle Nauta, and Robert Galambos, as well as neurophysiologist John W. Mason and neurosurgeon Robert. W. Porter. This pulling together of researchers from different backgrounds was characteristic of Brady's unitary vision of behavior analysis, neuroscience, and biology as aspects of the same scientific discipline that were separated only by their focus on different variables.

During this time, Brady's research group continued work on the conditioned emotional response in animal models using rats and primates, conducting studies on the effects of tetraethylammonium, amphetamine, reserpine, lysergic acid diethylamide (LSD), Nembutal, and Benzedrine. Brady's paper on reserpine led to considerable interest from pharmaceutical companies concerned with exploring the behavioral effects of pharmacological compounds for commercial use. As a result, Brady consulted with several of these companies, who set up labs, often led by Walter Reed alums, that adopted test procedures developed at Walter Reed. Brady also conducted one of the first studies of subcortical electrical brain self-stimulation in animals and authored a paper on "Ulcers in 'executive' monkeys", that provided evidence for the relationship between intermittent schedules of emotional stress and physical symptomology. This paper and its use of primate subjects caught the attention of Wernher von Braun, paving the way for Brady's work with the space program.

=== University of Maryland ===
In addition to his research program at Walter Reed, in 1957, Brady joined the faculty of the Psychology Department at the University of Maryland, College Park and became the director of the Psychopharmacology Laboratory, established with the help of a grant from the National Institute of Mental Health, the first they awarded in behavioral pharmacology. Early additions to the lab at College Park were Charles R. Schuster and Travis Thompson, who would go on to co-write the first textbook in behavioral pharmacology. As detailed in a 1961 Science paper, Schuster, Thompson, and Brady developed a procedure with rhesus monkeys that allowed the monkeys to intravenously self-administer a saline solution through lever pressing behavior. Later they would extend the self-administration procedure to the testing of drug abuse liability which would become a major focus of Brady's laboratory at Johns Hopkins University.

=== Involvement in the Space Program ===
Due to Brady's experience working with primates, Wernher von Braun of the U.S. Army Ballistics Agency solicited the help of Brady in training primates to provide data for the first live organism sub-orbital spaceflights initiated by the U.S. Brady and his collaborators, mainly Murray Sidman, who developed the avoidance procedure which would eventually take his name, trained rhesus monkeys to press a lever at specific time intervals to avoid an electric shock. If the lever was pressed within the time interval, no shock was received. In 1959, Able and Baker, two of the trained monkeys, were able to endure a 10,000 mile per hour suborbital flight in the nose cone of a Saturn rocket while successfully completing the pre-launch avoidance tasks and were safely recovered.

Brady also took part in the National Aeronautics and Space Administration (NASA) animal pretest flights for Project Mercury. Brady and other behavioral analysts from Walter Reed, including Bernard Migler (who later invented Seroquel), and the University of Maryland trained a number of chimpanzees to complete simple timed tasks in response to stimuli such as flashing lights and sounds. Successful completion of the task resulted in reward with a banana pellet, while failure resulted in electric shock. Ham, one of the trained chimpanzees, successfully completed a sub-orbital flight in 1961, with his in-flight task performance similar to his previous performance on Earth, providing evidence that simple tasks could be performed during space-flight. That year, Enos, another trained chimpanzee, successfully completed a flight into Earth's orbit and was successfully recovered, though the behavioral analysis test malfunctioned during the flight.

In addition to his work with primates, Brady and his research team established a continuously programmed human residential laboratory at the University of Maryland and later the Programmed Environmental Research Center at Johns Hopkins, that simulated conditions of prolonged human habitation in confined spaces, similar to those that would exist in prolonged space travel.

=== Johns Hopkins University ===
In 1970, Brady retired from the US Army at the rank of colonel and accepted an appointment at Johns Hopkins University Medical School in Baltimore as a professor of Behavioral Biology. At Hopkins, Brady continued the use of animal drug self-administration procedures, this time to test the abuse liability of drugs. Brady developed a procedure to test the relative reinforcing strength of a drug, which provided evidence for their potential for abuse. In this procedure, animals were trained to provide a specific response (e.g. push a lever) to receive an infusion of a drug. A progressive ratio schedule was then used, continually increasing the number of times the behavior would have to be performed to determine how many times the animal would perform the behavior to receive the drug, until a break point was reached in which the animal would no longer perform the behavior. This procedure allowed Brady and other researchers to rank order the addictive potential of drugs. The more times an animal would perform the behavior before reaching a break point, the more reinforcing the drug was, and the more liable the drug was to be abused.

Brady also utilized a drug substitution procedure, in which he tested whether animal subjects could discriminate between an initial training drug and a second test drug. If the animals provided the same behavioral responses to the test drug as the training drug, it could be supported that the drugs have similar subjective effects as well as abuse potential. These procedures were influential outside of Brady's lab, and were eventually adopted by the World Health Organization in 1978 to test the addiction risk of new medications worldwide. Brady's work in this area also helped illustrate how drugs are powerful reinforcers, amending basic theories of addiction and contributing to the development of modern approaches to substance abuse treatment.

=== Research Ethics ===
Brady served as a member of the National Commission for the Protection of Human Subjects that authored the landmark Belmont Report in 1978, which became the basis for Institutional Review Board ethics rules at research institutions nationwide. To the commission, Brady contributed a radical behaviorist perspective on ethics as consisting of two components: values, or what people say is important to them, and morals, the practices that society rewards and punishes.

== Honors and awards ==
Over the course of his career, Brady amassed considerable professional honors and awards including: President of the Society for Behavioral Medicine, President of the Society for Behavioral Pharmacology. Bioastronautics Research Award for Outstanding Contributions to the space program. Member, Life Sciences Panel, President's Science Advisory Committee (1961–1963); chairman, National Institutes of Health Study Section (1972–1976, 1979–1984, 1989–1994); chairman, National Academy of Sciences Committee on Problems of Drug Dependence (1981–1983); Associate Chairman, National Commission for the Protection of Human Subjects of Biomedical and Behavioral Research (1974–1979); Member, Committee on Space Biology and Medicine, National Academy of Sciences (1984–1988); Member, NASA and National Institutes of Health Scientific Advisory Committee on Biomedical and Behavioral Research (1995); Distinguished Scientific Contribution Award, American Psychological Association (1992); President, Society of Behavioral Medicine (1979); and Distinguished Scientific Service Award, Association for Behavior Analysis (1996). In 2011, Brady was honored for his 50 years of leadership of the Institutes for Behavior Resources, Inc. located in Baltimore, Maryland.

== Death ==
On July 29, 2011, Brady died of cardiorespiratory arrest.

== Notable publications ==
- Brady, J.V. (1951).The effect of electroconvulsive shock on a conditioned emotional response: the permanence of the effect Journal of Comparative and Physiological Psychology. 44: 507–511. DOI: 10.1037/h0062743
- Brady, J.V.. (1956). Assessment of drug effects on emotional behavior [6] Science. 123: 1033–1034.
- Brady, J.V. (1957). A review of comparative behavioral pharmacology. Annals of the New York Academy of Sciences. 66: 719–32. PMID 13425254
- Brady, J.V., Griffiths, R.R. (1976). Behavioral procedures for evaluating the relative abuse potential of CNS drugs in primates. Federation Proceedings. 35: 2245–53. PMID 821784
- Brady, J.V., Emurian, H.H. (1978). Behavior analysis of motivational and emotional interactions in a programmed environment. Nebraska Symposium On Motivation. Nebraska Symposium On Motivation. 26: 81–122. PMID 552609
- Brady, J.V.. (1981). Common mechanisms in substance abuse. Nida Research Monograph. 37: 11–20. PMID 6798453
- Brady, J.V., Bernstein, D.J., Foltin, R.W., Nellis, M.J. (1988). Performance enhancement in a semi-autonomous confined microsociety. The Pavlovian Journal of Biological Science. 23: 111–7. PMID 3174260 DOI: 10.1007/BF02701285
- Brady, J.V., Hienz, R.D., Ator, N.A. (1990). Stimulus functions of drugs and the assessment of abuse liability Drug Development Research. 20: 231–249. DOI: 10.1002/ddr.430200209
- Brady, J.V.. (1990). Toward applied behavior analysis of life aloft. Behavioral Science. 35: 11–23. PMID 11538209
- Brady, J.V.. (1991). Animal models for assessing drugs of abuse. Neuroscience and Biobehavioral Reviews. 15: 35–43. PMID 2052196DOI: 10.1016/S0149-7634(05)80089-2
- Brady, J.V.. (1993). Behavior analysis applications and interdisciplinary research strategies. The American Psychologist. 48: 435–40. PMID 8512155
