= Space Cat =

Space Cat may refer to:

- Space Cats, an animated television series
- "Space Cat", a short story in Garfield: His 9 Lives

== See also ==
- Giant Spacekat, an independent video game development studio
- Cats in Space, British rock band
- The Cat from Outer Space, 1978 film by Norman Tokar
- Félicette, first and only cat to survive spaceflight
