= Ham (chimpanzee) =

First great ape launched into space (1957–1983)

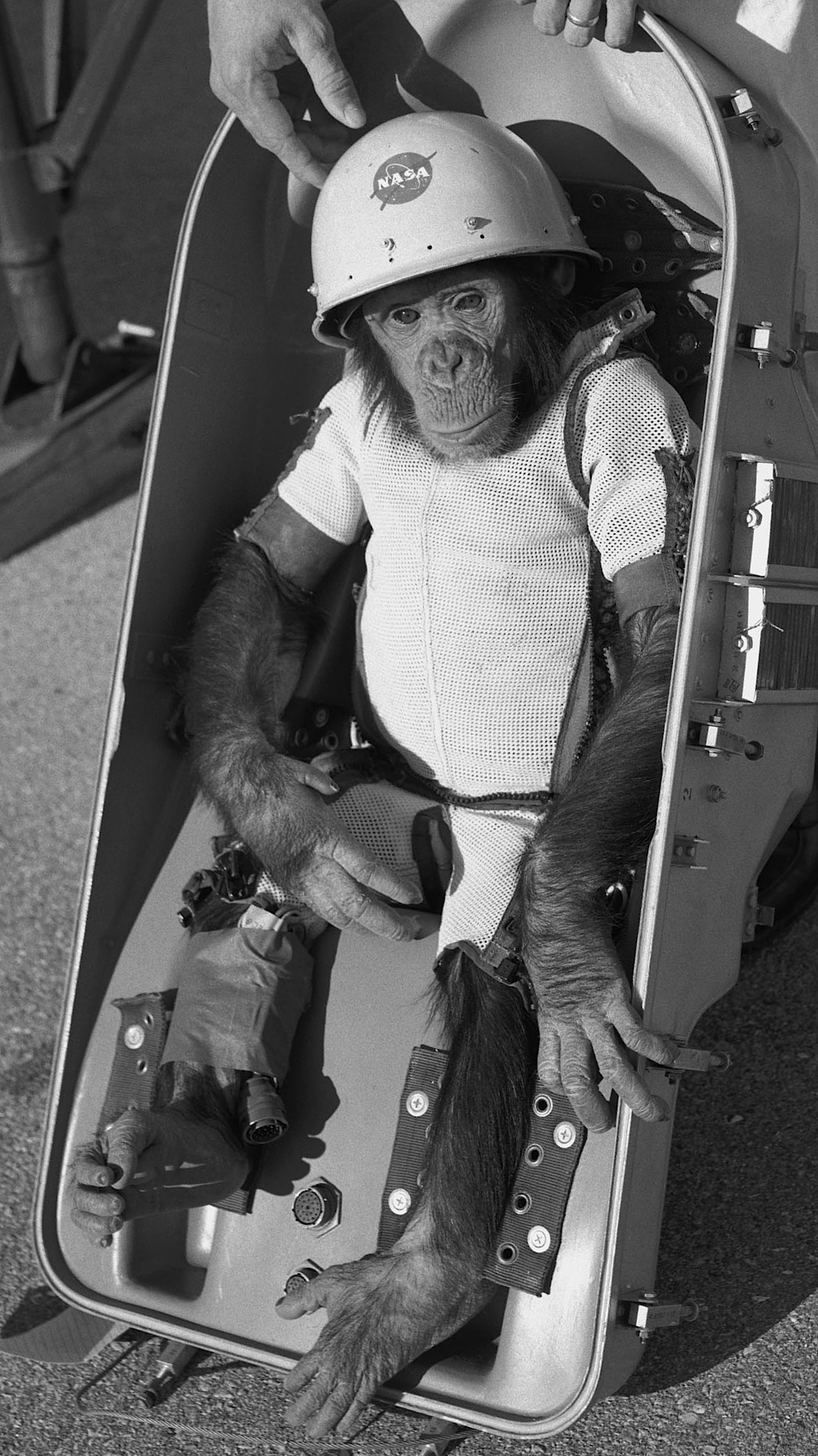
- Ham in January 1961, just before his suborbital flight into space
- Species: Chimpanzee
- Sex: Male
- Born: July 1957; French Cameroon
- Died: January 19, 1983 (aged 25); North Carolina Zoo, Asheboro, North Carolina, U.S.
- Resting place: Museum of Space History, New Mexico
- Known for: First non-human hominid in space

Ham (July 1957 – January 19, 1983), a chimpanzee also known as Ham the Chimp and Ham the Astrochimp, was the first ape launched into space. On January 31, 1961, Ham flew a suborbital flight on the Mercury-Redstone 2 mission, part of the U.S. space program's Project Mercury.

Ham was known as "No. 65" before he safely returned to Earth. His name was likely in honor of the commander of Holloman Aeromedical Laboratory, Lieutenant Colonel Hamilton "Ham" Blackshear. It was also an acronym for the laboratory that prepared him for his historic mission, the Holloman Aerospace Medical Center, located at Holloman Air Force Base in New Mexico, southwest of Alamogordo.

== Early life ==
Ham was born in the wild in French Cameroon, his birth month retrospectively calculated as July 1957 based on dental eruption. He was captured by animal trappers and sent to the Rare Bird Farm in Miami, Florida. He was purchased by the United States Air Force and brought to Holloman Air Force Base in July 1959. Ham was sold to the United States Air Force for $457.

There were originally 40 chimpanzee flight candidates at Holloman. After evaluation, the number of candidates was reduced to 18, then to six, including Ham. Officially, Ham was known as No. 65 before his flight. This was reportedly because officials did not want the bad press that would come from the death of a named chimpanzee if the mission were a failure. Among his handlers, No. 65 had also been known as "Chop Chop Chang".

Ham being given a physical examination by a doctor in 1961

== Training and mission ==
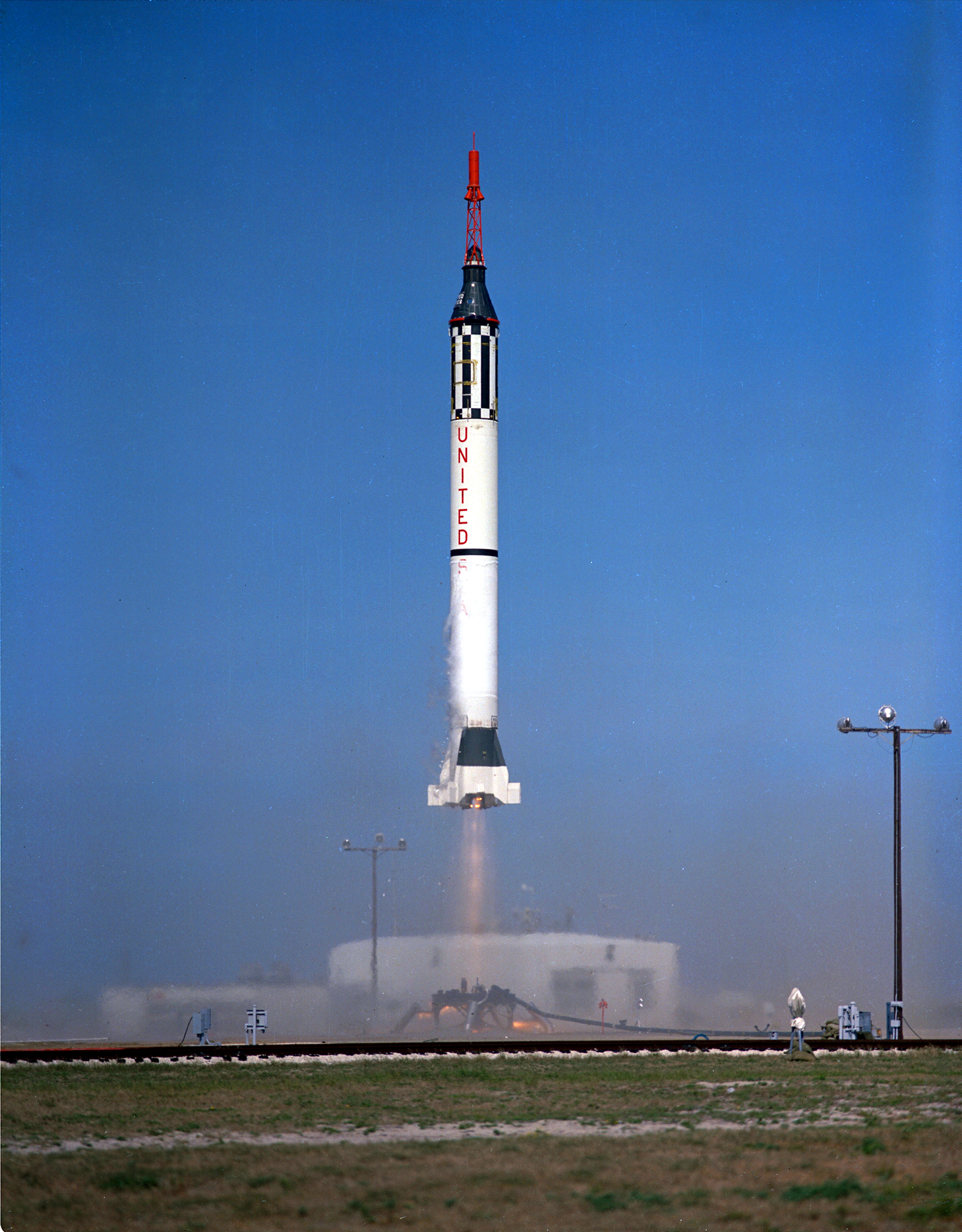
Launch of Ham's mission, January 31, 1961

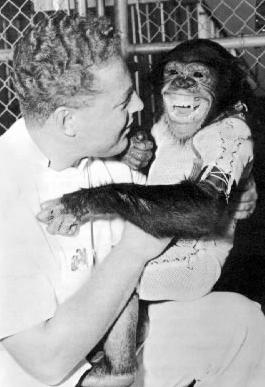
Ham and his trainer, Joseph V. Brady

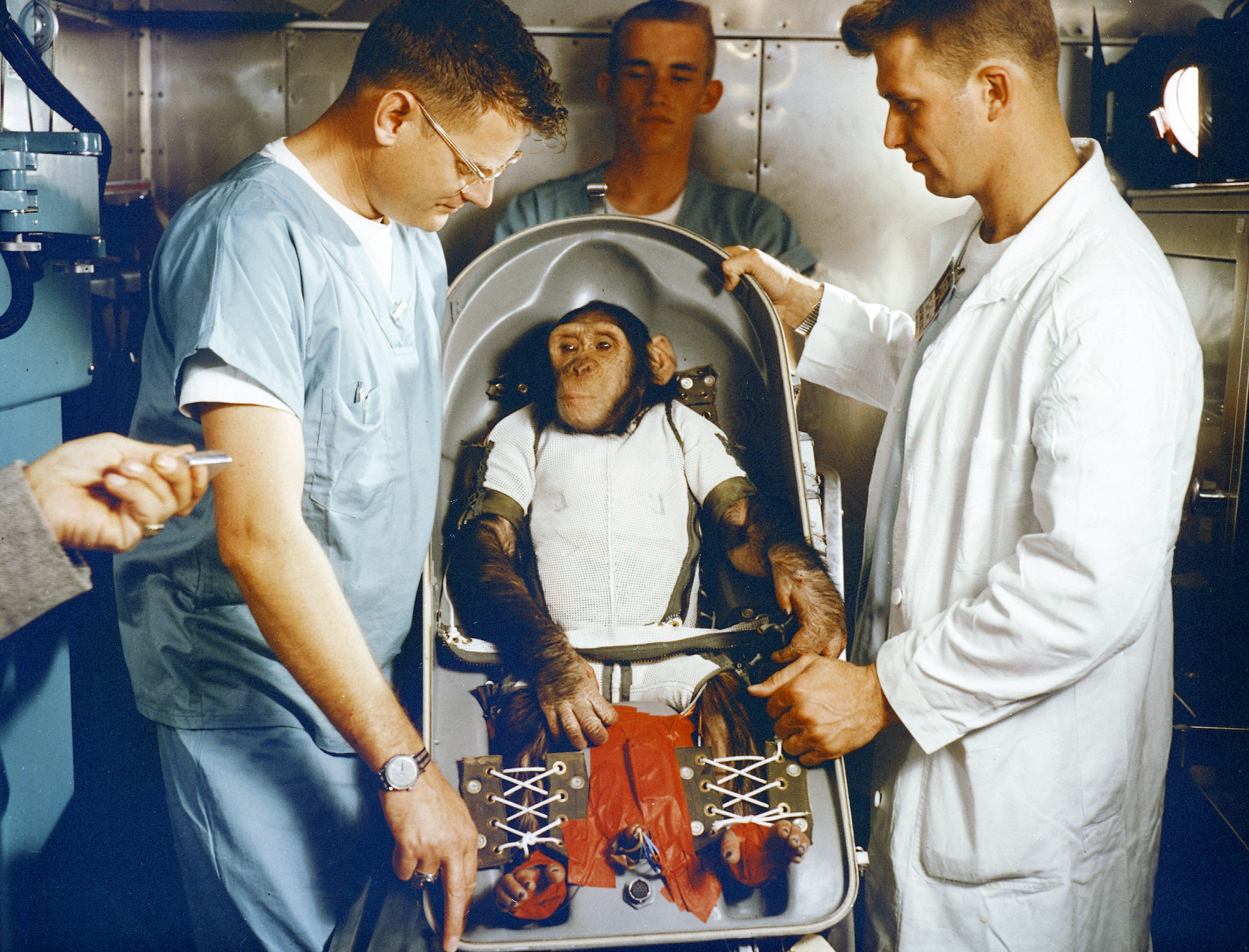
Ham, the first great ape in space, before being inserted into his Mercury-Redstone 2 capsule on 31 January 1961

Beginning in July 1959, the two-year-old chimpanzee was trained under the direction of neuroscientist Joseph V. Brady at Holloman Air Force Base Aero-Medical Field Laboratory to do simple, timed tasks in response to electric lights and sounds. During his pre-flight training, Ham was taught to push a lever within five seconds of seeing a flashing blue light; failure to do so resulted in an application of a light electric shock to the soles of his feet, while a correct response earned him a banana pellet. Ham was trained for 219 hours during a 15-month period.

While Ham was the first great ape, he was not the first animal to go to space; there were many other types of animals, including primates, that had left Earth's atmosphere before him. However, none of these other animals could provide the significant insight that Ham could provide. One of the reasons that a chimpanzee was chosen for this mission was because of their many similarities to humans, including similar organ placement inside the body and having a response time to a stimulus that was very near to that of humans. Through observing of Ham scientists would gain a better understanding of the possibility of sending humans into space.

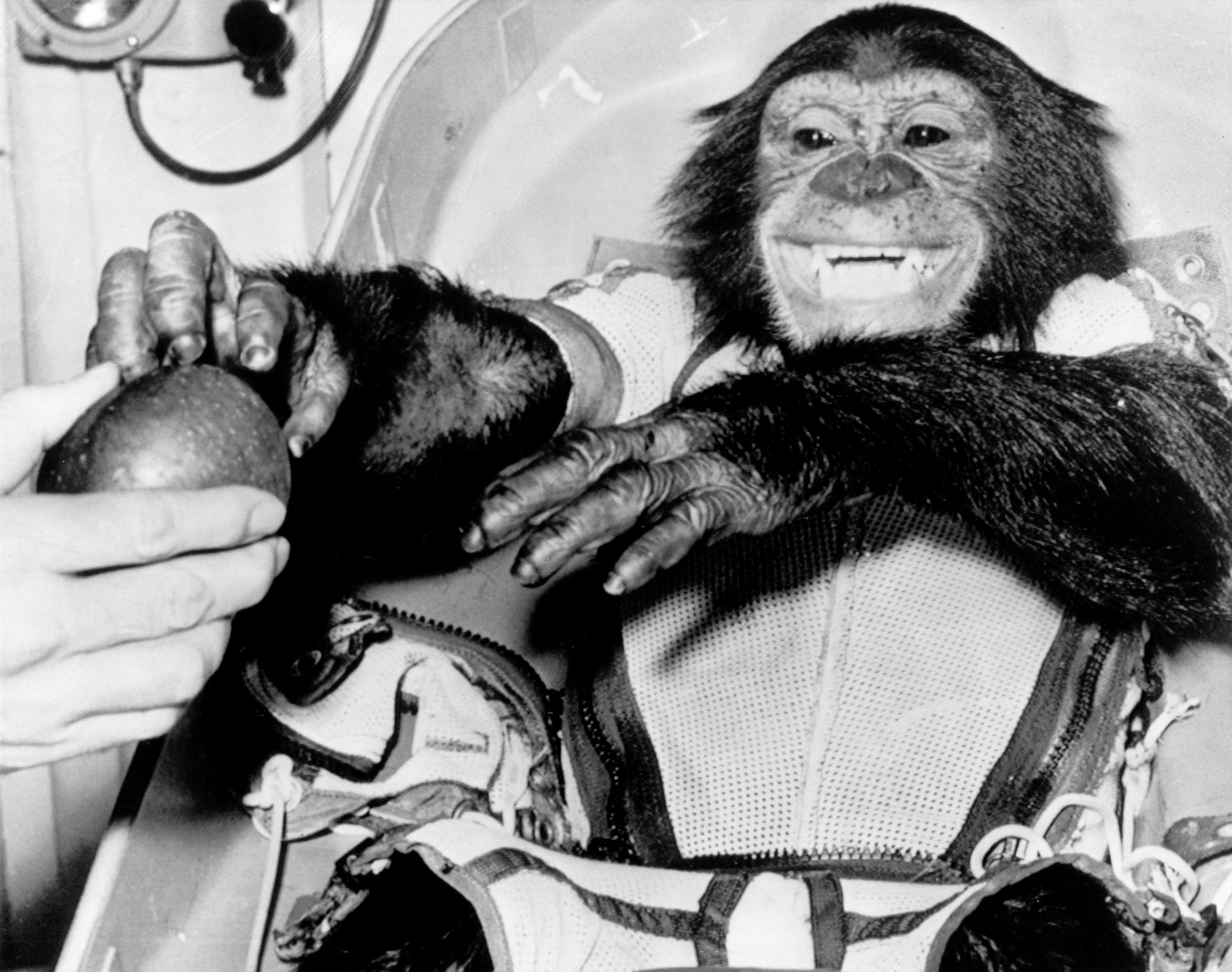
Ham receives an apple following his successful recovery from the Atlantic

On January 31, 1961, Ham was secured in a Project Mercury mission designated MR-2 and launched from Cape Canaveral, Florida, on a suborbital flight.

A number of physiological sensors were used to monitor Ham's vital signs (electrocardiogram, respiration, and body temperature). A commercial rectal thermistor probe was used instead of the probe used on the human Mercury astronauts. The probe was inserted 8 inches deep into Ham's rectum. The physiological sensors were placed on Ham about 10 hours before liftoff. Ham's ability to complete tasks during the flight were assessed by the psychomotor apparatus. The apparatus gave Ham a visual cue in the form of colored lights and required a response from two levers; if he succeed in his task, drink and food pellet would be awarded; failure would be punished by a shock to the soles of his feet.

Due to a valve malfunction, the Redstone rocket delivered thrust higher than intended. The anomaly triggered the emergency escape rocket and subjected Ham to 17 g of acceleration. The jettison of the spent escape rocket also caused the retro rocket pack to be prematurely jettisoned. The lack of the retro rocket caused the capsule to reenter the atmosphere with excessive speed. Ham was subjected to 14.7 g during reentry. Ham's capsule splashed down in the Atlantic Ocean and was recovered by the USS Donner later that day. The capsule was damaged during splashdown and settled deeper in the water than designed.

The post flight examination found a small abrasion on the bridge of Ham's nose; he was also dehydrated and lost 5.37% body weight; he was otherwise in good physical condition. His flight was 16 minutes and 39 seconds long. He would become agitated when the press approached him and panic when his handler would try to situate him into a capsule for photos.

Ham's lever-pushing performance in space was only a fraction of a second slower than on Earth, demonstrating that tasks could be performed in space. Of the two shocks Ham received in flight, the one shortly after the launch was due to an error in the testing apparatus; the other one due to the lack of response after experiencing 14 g deceleration during reentry. The results from his test flight led directly to Alan Shepard's May 5, 1961, suborbital flight aboard Freedom 7.

== Later life ==
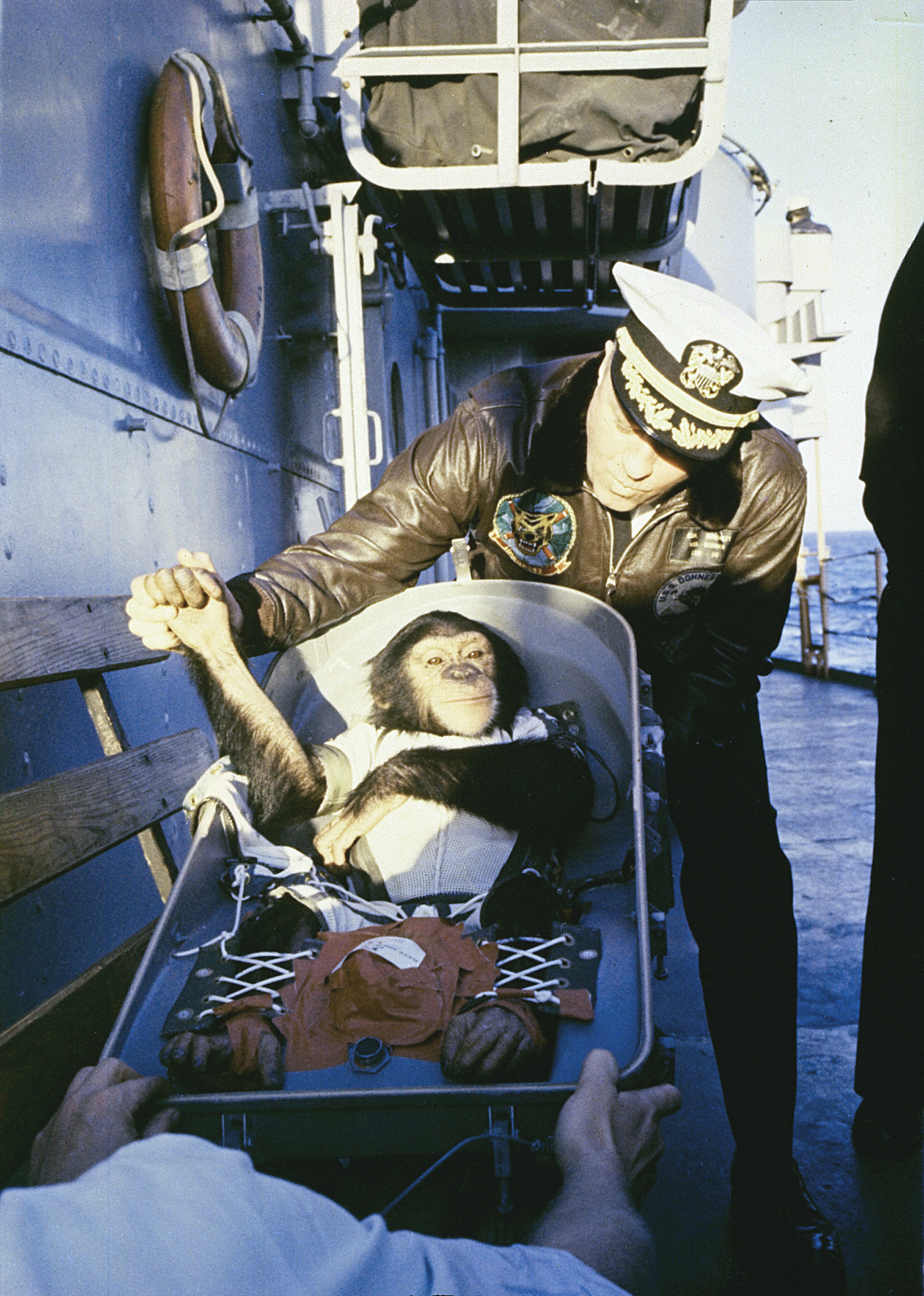
Ham is greeted by the commander of the recovery ship after his flight.

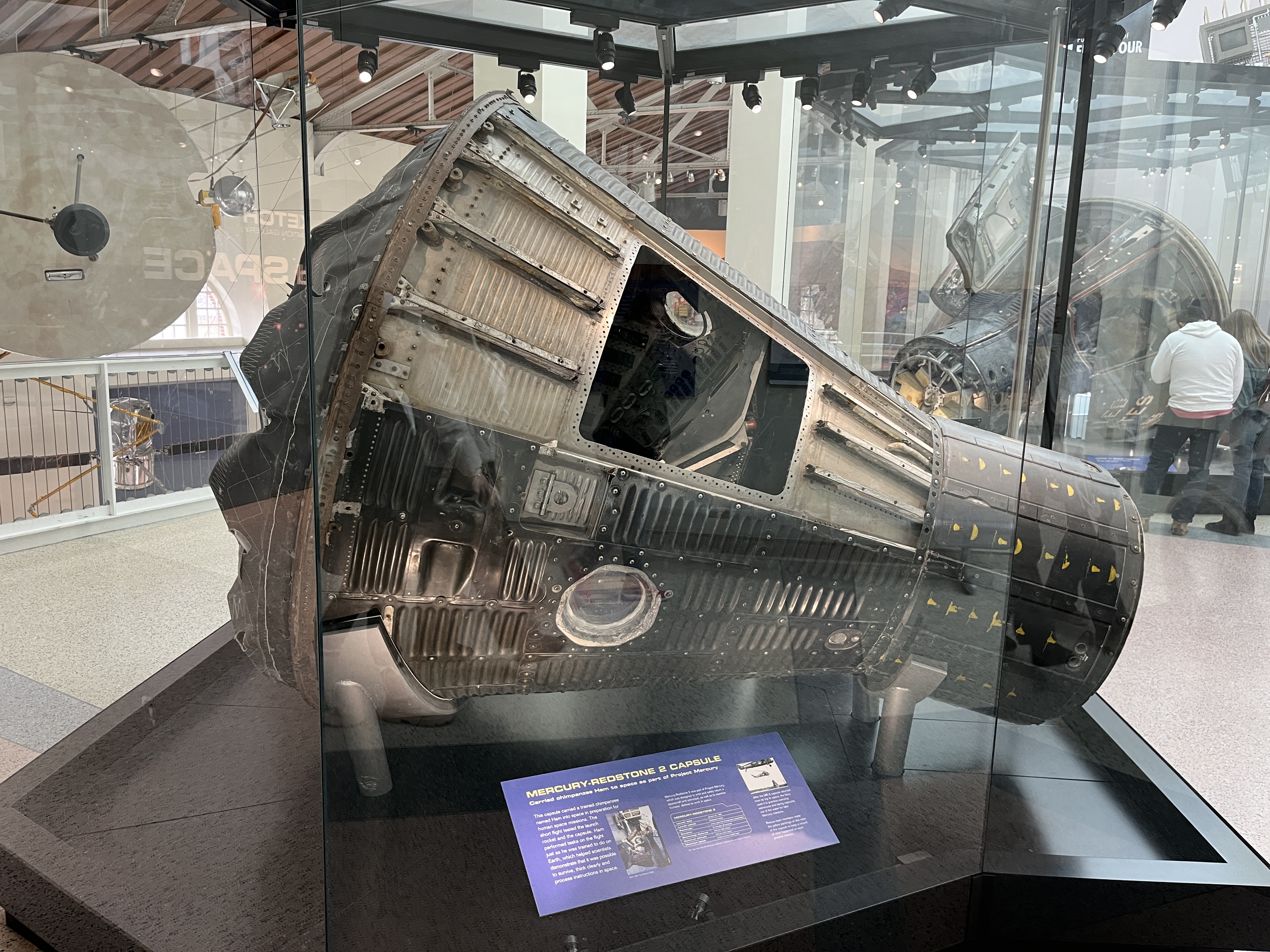
The Mercury-Redstone 2 capsule that carried Ham to space on display at the California Science Center in Los Angeles, California

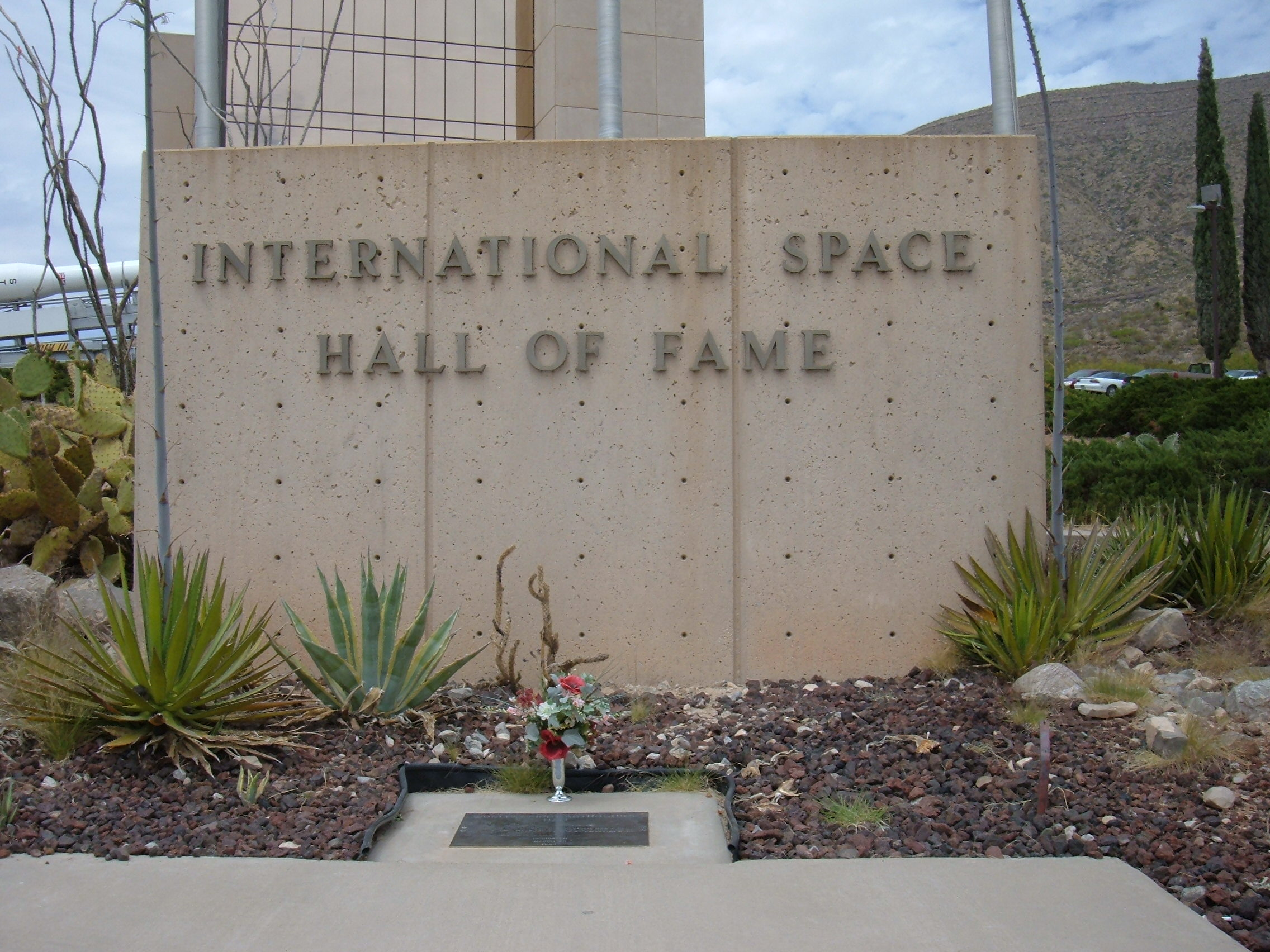
Ham's grave at the New Mexico Museum of Space History in Alamogordo, New Mexico

Ham retired from the National Aeronautics and Space Administration (NASA) in 1963. On April 5, 1963, Ham was transferred to the National Zoo in Washington, D.C., where he lived for 17 years before joining a small group of chimps at North Carolina Zoo in Asheboro, on September 25, 1980. On July 14, 2026, Ham received a state historic marker outside the zoo.

Suffering from chronic heart and liver disease, Ham died on January 19, 1983, at age 25. Following a necropsy by the Armed Forces Institute of Pathology, Ham's body was to be taxidermied and placed on display at the Smithsonian Institution, following Soviet precedent with pioneering space dogs Belka and Strelka. However, after negative public reaction, the plan was abandoned. Ham's skeleton is held in the collection of the National Museum of Health and Medicine, Silver Spring, Maryland, and the rest of his remains were buried at the International Space Hall of Fame in Alamogordo, New Mexico. Colonel John Stapp gave the eulogy at the memorial service.

Minnie, Ham's backup, was the only female chimpanzee trained for the Mercury program. After her role in the Mercury program ended, Minnie became part of an Air Force chimpanzee breeding program, producing nine offspring and helping to raise the offspring of several other members of the chimpanzee colony. Minnie was the last surviving astro-chimpanzee and died on March 14, 1998 at the age of 41.

== Cultural references ==
- Tom Wolfe's 1979 book The Right Stuff depicts Ham's spaceflight, as do its 1983 film and 2020 TV adaptations.
- The 2001 film Race to Space is a fictionalized version of Ham's story; the chimpanzee in the film is named "Mac".
- In 2007, a French documentary made in association with Animal Planet, Ham—Astrochimp #65, tells the story of Ham as witnessed by Jeff, who took care of Ham until his departure from the Air Force base after the success of the mission. It is also known as Ham: A Chimp into Space / Ham, un chimpanzé dans l'espace.
- The 2008 3D animated film Space Chimps follows anthropomorphic chimpanzees and their adventures in space. The primary protagonist is named Ham III, depicted as the grandson of Ham.
- In 2008, Bark Hide and Horn, a folk-rock band from Portland, Oregon, released a song titled "Ham the Astrochimp", detailing the journey of Ham from his perspective.

== See also ==
- Animals in space
- Monkeys and apes in space
- Albert II, a rhesus monkey, became the first mammal in space on June 14, 1949
- Laika, a Soviet space dog, was the first animal to orbit Earth, November 3, 1957
- Yuri Gagarin, the first human and second hominid in space as well as the first primate in orbit, orbited April 12, 1961
- Enos, the second of the two chimpanzees launched into space, and the only one to orbit Earth, November 29, 1961
- Félicette, the only cat in space, October 18, 1963
- One Small Step: The Story of the Space Chimps, 2008 documentary
- Spaceflight
- List of individual apes
