= Bark Hide and Horn =

American indie folk rock band

- Origin: Portland, Oregon, United States
- Genres: Indie rock, folk-rock, naturalist rock
- Years active: 2005–2009
- Labels: Boy Howdy Records
- Past members: Andy Furgeson; Peter Valois; Dusty Dybvig; Brian Garvey

Bark Hide and Horn were an indie/folk-rock band from Portland, Oregon.

== History ==
Bark Hide and Horn has released one self-titled EP, and one LP entitled National Road. Thus far, the music on these albums has focused on the history and content of the National Geographic magazine from the years 1957 to 1967, when it was under the editorship of Melville Bell Grosvenor. National Road contained as its centerpiece a fictionalized narrative focusing on Melville Bell Grosvenor and the implicit downtrodden perspectives left unaddressed by the content of the magazine.

In their initial incarnation, Bark Hide and Horn consisted of Andy Anderson Furgeson on guitar, vocals, harmonica, violin, banjo, and pedal steel and Brian Garvey on mandolin, keyboard, synth, trumpet, saxophone, trombone, percussion, and vocals. Eventually, Peter Valois on bass, vibraphone, vocals, glockenspiel, penny whistle, and percussion and Dusty Dybvig on drums, percussion, and theremin were added to the band's lineup. The band members, used to playing in larger ensembles, found that they needed to constantly switch between instruments live in order to achieve the full sound that they desired.

== Genre ==
The National Geographic-heavy content of Bark Hide and Horn's first EP and album has led some to identify Bark Hide and Horn as a naturalist-core band. Others have described Bark Hide and Horn as having "navigated around roots rock to find the actual roots" given the content of their songs.

== In the Portland music scene ==
Bark Hide and Horn played in the 2008 PDX Pop Now Festival. Additionally, they performed at the 2008 Northwest Folklife Festival.

== Recognition ==
In addition to garnering praise from music critics for their debut album, the music has also been recognized by PZ Myers, a prominent atheist, in his blog Pharyngula for depicting mollusks and other invertebrates in a positive light. Additionally, according to an article in The Portland Mercury, Jane Goodall loves a song from National Road that focuses on the spacefaring chimpanzee Ham, and mentions her in the lyrics.

== Discography ==
Year	Title	Record label	Ref.
2008	National Road (Album)	Boy Howdy Records	
2008	Bark Hide and Horn (EP)	Boy Howdy Records	
2010	Animal Mind (EP)	Swollen Nation Music	
