= Snowshoe cat =

Breed of cat

Snowshoe Cat
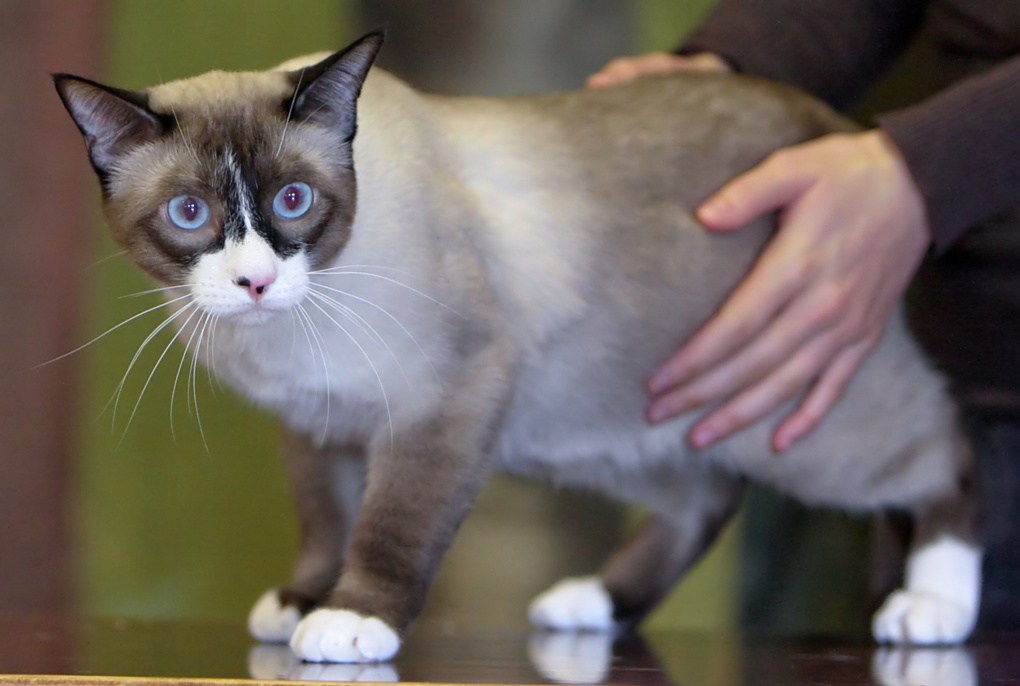
- Young cat at a cat show in Finland
- Common nicknames: Snowshoe Siamese, Silver Laces
- Origin: United States

Breed standards
- FIFe: standard
- TICA: standard
- WCF: standard
- ACFA/CAA: standard
- GCCF: standard

The Snowshoe is a rare breed of domestic cat originating in the United States of America in the 1960s. Its short-haired coat has a bicolour colourpoint pattern. The breed takes its name from the characteristic white feet forming the white shoe pattern. It is a pointed cat with blue eyes.

Snowshoes were first produced when a Siamese breeder's cat gave birth to three kittens with white feet. The breeder, Dorothy Hinds-Daugherty, then began a breeding programme to produce what were originally called "Silver Laces", crossing the strangely marked Siamese cats with bicolour American Shorthair cats and other breeds. Despite having existed for 45 years, Snowshoes are rare due to the difficulty of reproducing the correct coat markings.

== History ==
In the 1960s, a cat owned by Siamese cat breeder Dorothy Hinds-Daugherty produced a litter of Siamese kittens in Philadelphia, Pennsylvania, US. Three of the kittens had unique markings, consisting of white points and feet. Intrigued by their looks, she began working to breed cats like them, using black ('seal') point Siamese with bicolour American Shorthairs. The offspring of those cats lacked the Siamese points, but by breeding the offspring to Siamese cats, the desired look was accomplished. Hinds-Daugherty named the breed "Snowshoe" because of their white feet. Hinds-Daugherty promoted the Snowshoe at local cats shows, though they were not recognised at the time. Hinds-Daughtery eventually abandoned the Snowshoe breeding programme, and it was taken up by Vikki Olander.

== Breed registration ==
=== Breed recognition ===
Olander wrote the first breed standard for the Snowshoe, and succeeded in obtaining the Cat Fanciers Federation (CFF) and the American Cat Association's (ACA) "experimental breed" status for the Snowshoe in 1974. However, by 1977, Olander was the last breeder of the Snowshoe in the United States. After struggling to keep the breed alive, Olander was contacted by Jim Hoffman and Georgia Kuhnell, who were interested in the breed. Other breeders joined Olander, Hoffman, and Kuhnell, and they obtained the champion status from the CFF in 1983. In 1989, Olander left the programme, as her fiancé was allergic to cats. However, by then the Snowshoe had a strong following, and the breed attained champion status with the American Cat Fanciers Association (ACFA) in 1990 and was recognised by The International Cat Association (TICA) in 1993. Snowshoes were also fully recognised by the Fédération Internationale Féline (FIFe) in 2004. Currently, breeders work to attain acceptance with the Cat Fanciers' Association (CFA), but struggle with the lack of cats and breeders needed for the association's requirements.

=== Popularity ===
Snowshoes are a relatively rare breed worldwide. In the 2024 statistics of FIFe, one of the major global cat registries, the breed ranked at position 44 out of 54 breeds in popularity, comprising 0,04% of their total registered kittens that year, which translates to 35 cats.

== Characteristics ==
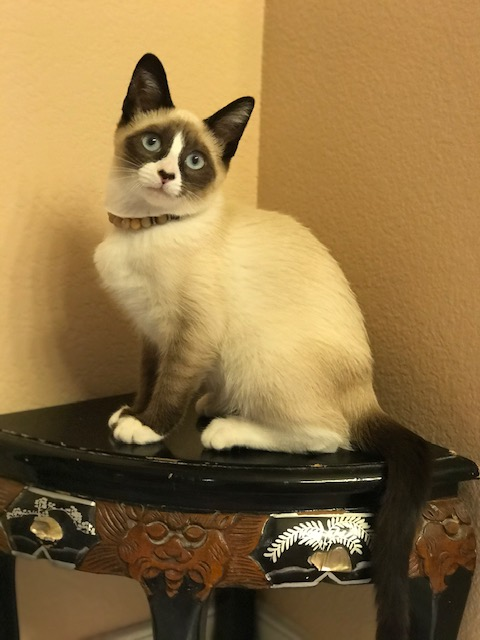
4-month-old show-quality kitten demonstrating white-tipped colourpoints on paws and face

=== Appearance ===
==== Body ====
The Snowshoe is a medium-sized cat of foreign type, combining the heftiness of its shorthair ancestors with the length of its oriental ancestors. It has a long, firm body with medium bone and musculature, well-knit and powerful without bulk. Overall balance is essential, with no extremes in size or type. Muscular yet agile, it presents the impression of an elegant, athletic cat, with the appearance of a runner rather than a weightlifter and no feature exaggerated.

==== Head ====
The head forms a broad modified wedge with slightly rounded contours. It is of medium length and medium size in proportion to the body. The top of the head is slightly rounded, with a slightly flat forehead. Cheekbones are set high with rounded contours. The nose is straight and of medium length in proportion to the rest of the head, with a slight slope to the forehead creating two distinct planes in profile. The muzzle is of good length, neither extremely broad nor pointed nor square. The muzzle break is slight, forming a gentle contour. The chin is firm. Ears are broad at the base with slightly rounded tips. They are medium to medium-large in size, in proportion to the body.

Eyes are blue, bright, sparkling and expressive. They are walnut-shaped, with greater length than width, of medium size and slanted towards the base of the ears. The eyes are set one eye-width apart and do not protrude. The outer edge of the eye aperture is level with the base of the ears.

=== Coat ===
The Snowshoe's coat should be of medium-short to short in length, and should be bright and smooth with no noticeable undercoat. It is considered a fault within cat associations if the Snowshoe has a plush or double coat. The texture is smooth, glossy and close-lying. The Snowshoe's coat undergoes seasonal changes and does not require much grooming.

==== Colour ====
In registries and cat associations, the recognised Snowshoe coat colour is a point colouration that features a light body colour and darker ears, face, legs, and tail. The colour of the points—ears, mask, legs and tail—must be well defined and in harmony with the body colour. Snowshoe point gradients end in sharply-contrasting white tips on the paws and nose/muzzle. The ACFA recognises black ('seal') and blue point colouration, whilst the FIFe and TICA recognise all pointed colours: black ('seal'), blue, chocolate, lilac, cinnamon, fawn, red, and cream point colouration. Additionally, the FIFe recognises the colours in tortoiseshell, tabby, and tortoiseshell-tabby coat patterns. Snowshoe kittens are born white, and markings appear within 1 to 3 weeks.

==== White spotting pattern ====
Any amount of white on the body is permitted. The chin may be white, the colour of the points, or a combination of white and point colour. A white bib on the chest area or collar around the neck area is normal, as is white on the stomach area. Nose leather may be pink, point colour, flesh tone or mottled. All four feet must be white. All degrees of white are acceptable within defined limits: on the front legs, white extends from the toes up to the mid-leg area; on the back legs, white extends from the toes up to the mid-thigh area. The preferred pattern is a white “ᐱ” on the face in combination with the white shoe pattern.

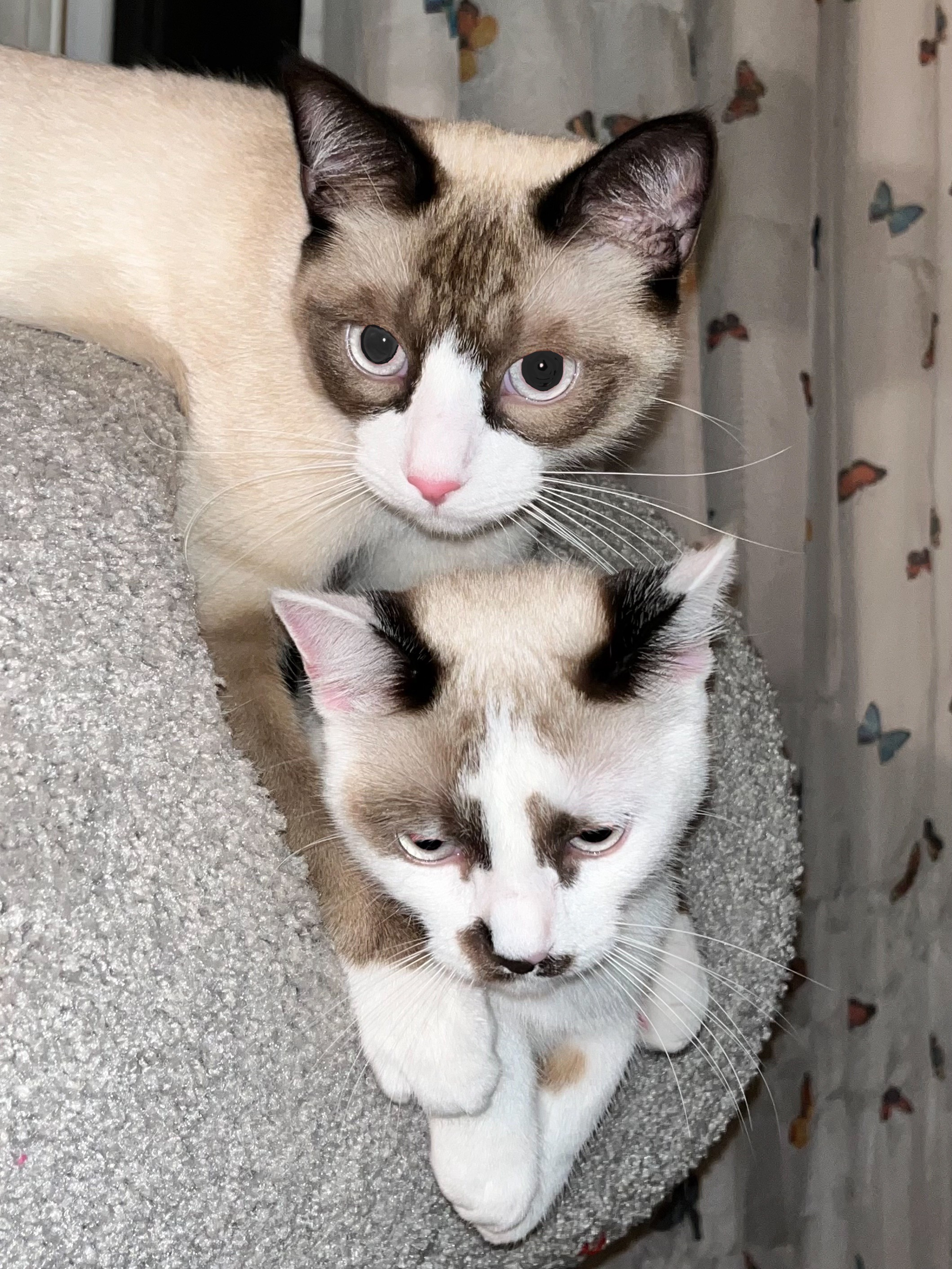
A pair of non-Snowshoe domestic short-haired littermates demonstrating the difficulty in achieving pattern uniformity. Featuring the proper markings for the breed (top) and skewed markings (bottom).

The Snowshoe is a rare breed, partly due to the difficulty of breeding cats with markings and patterns that conform well to breed standards. Each Snowshoe has a pattern unique to the individual cat. The Snowshoe's pattern relies on recessive genes and other factors to produce desired results. One gene, which causes the "ᐱ" facial pattern, is an example of incomplete dominance. If the offspring produced has two dominant genes for the marking, then the feature will be larger than a cat with one dominant gene. However, other factors may influence the feature, which makes it difficult to predict the outcome. Another issue is the white boots, which can be caused by a white spotting-gene or a gloving gene. The genes are difficult to control, and many cats' boots extend too far up the leg, do not reach far enough up the leg, or the cat completely lacks white. As such, pet-quality Snowshoes usually have too much white, too little white, or white features are mismarked. The cats' body type further complicates breeding, as the breeder must achieve the correct head shape and ear set, while still maintaining the body structure of the American Shorthair and the length of the Siamese.

=== Behaviour ===
Snowshoes are generally affectionate, sweet-tempered, and mellow. They enjoy the company of humans and being given attention, and are compatible with children and other pets. Snowshoes are very social and docile, and show great devotion and love towards their owners. Consequently, the cats of this breed dislike being left alone for long periods of time and are able to cope with working hours better if they have another cat companion. The cats are also noted as being intelligent; they can learn to open various types of doors, and can be taught tricks, especially fetch. Snowshoes also enjoy water, particularly running water, and may on occasion swim.

== Health ==
In a review of over 5,000 cases of urate urolithiasis the Snowshoe was over-represented, with three recorded cases out of a population of 16.
