= Bicolor cat =

Cat having fur of two colors

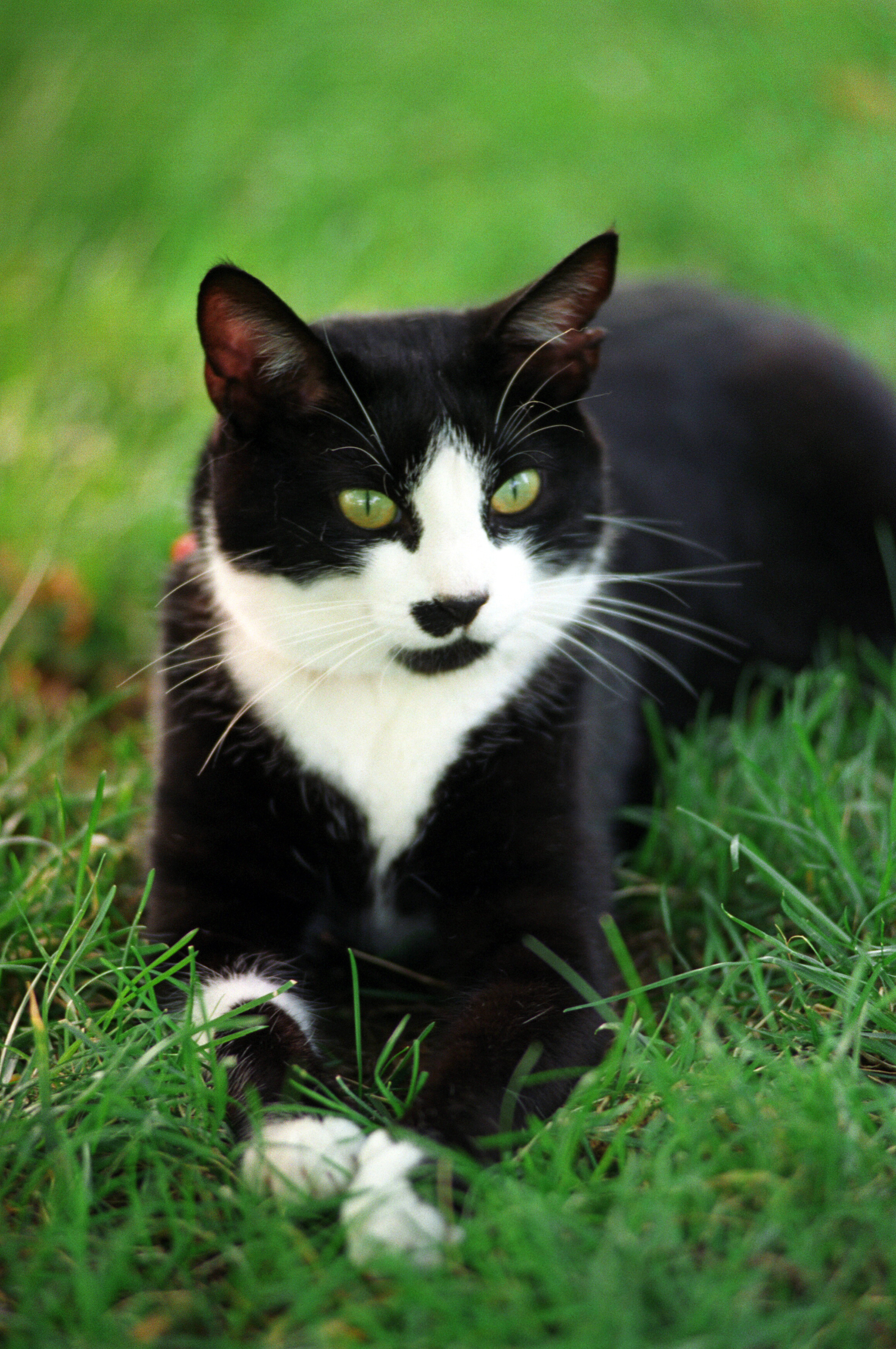
Chelsea Clinton's cat Socks (1989–2009) lived in the White House from 1993 to 2001. Socks was a bicolor cat with low-grade spotting, or tuxedo cat.

A bicolor cat (or bicolour cat in Commonwealth English) is a cat with white fur combined with fur of some other color, such as solid black, tabby, or colorpointed. There are various patterns of a bicolor cat. Bicolor coats are found in many cat breeds.

Tuxedo cats have a low-to-medium grade white spotting limited to the face, paws, throat, and chest of an otherwise black cat. Van-patterned cats have high-grade bicolor, which is typical for the Turkish Van breed. There are many patterns, such as "cap-and-saddle", "mask-and-mantle" and "harlequin" (also known as "magpie").

Solid-color bicolor cats occur because there is a white spotting gene present with a recessive allele of the agouti gene. The agouti gene evens out the striped pattern within coat colors. In contrast, tabby cats have an agouti gene that produces striping of the coat. The Abyssinian has agouti (ticked tabby) fur, giving the appearance of even color with color-banded hairs.

== Bicolor patterns ==
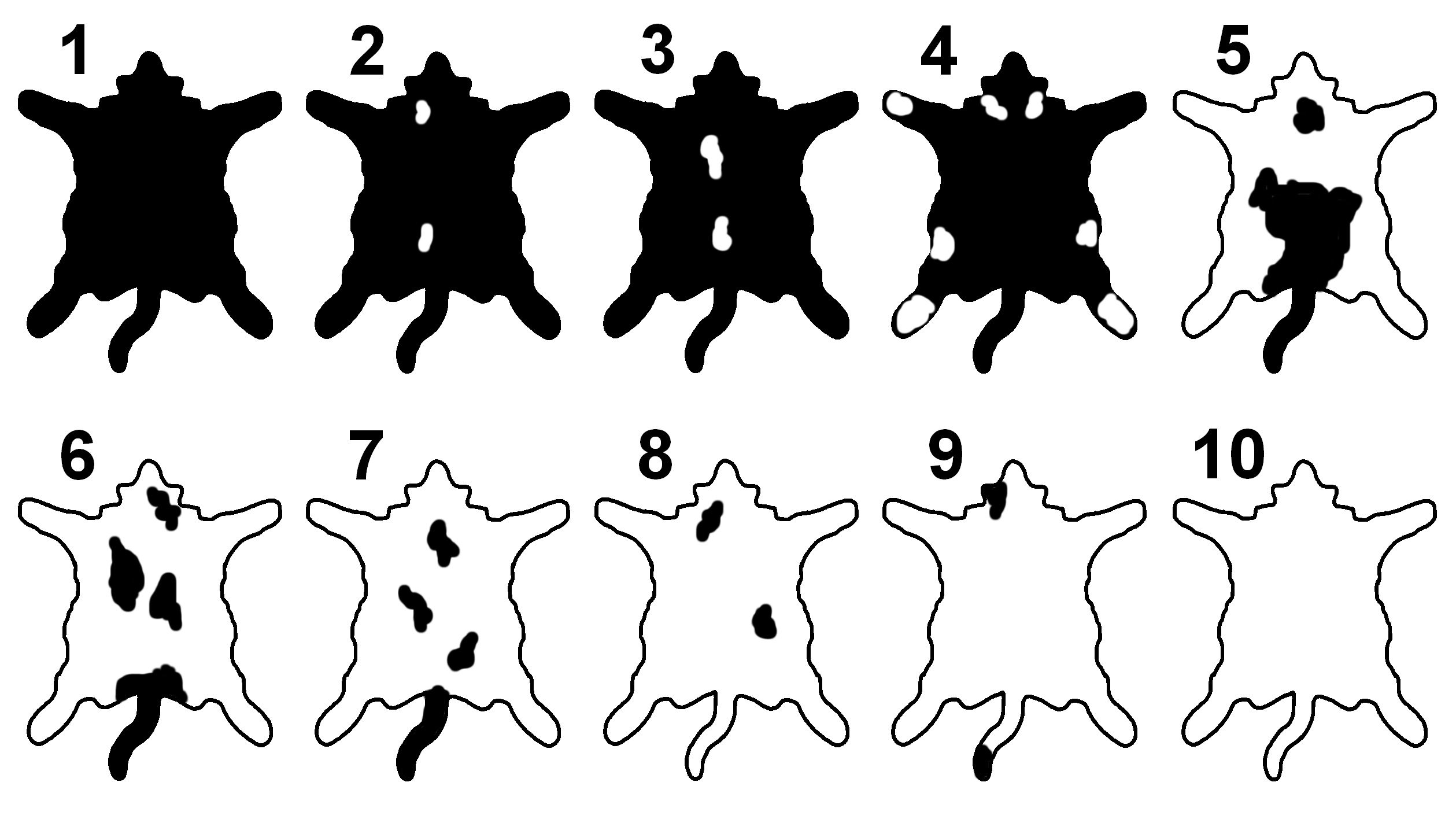
Bicolor grade chart, ranging from 1 (solid colored) to 10 (solid white)

Bicolor pattern chart

Bicoloration in cats is graded from one to ten; with one being completely colored, and ten being completely white. There are also several patterns with their own names.

=== Van ===
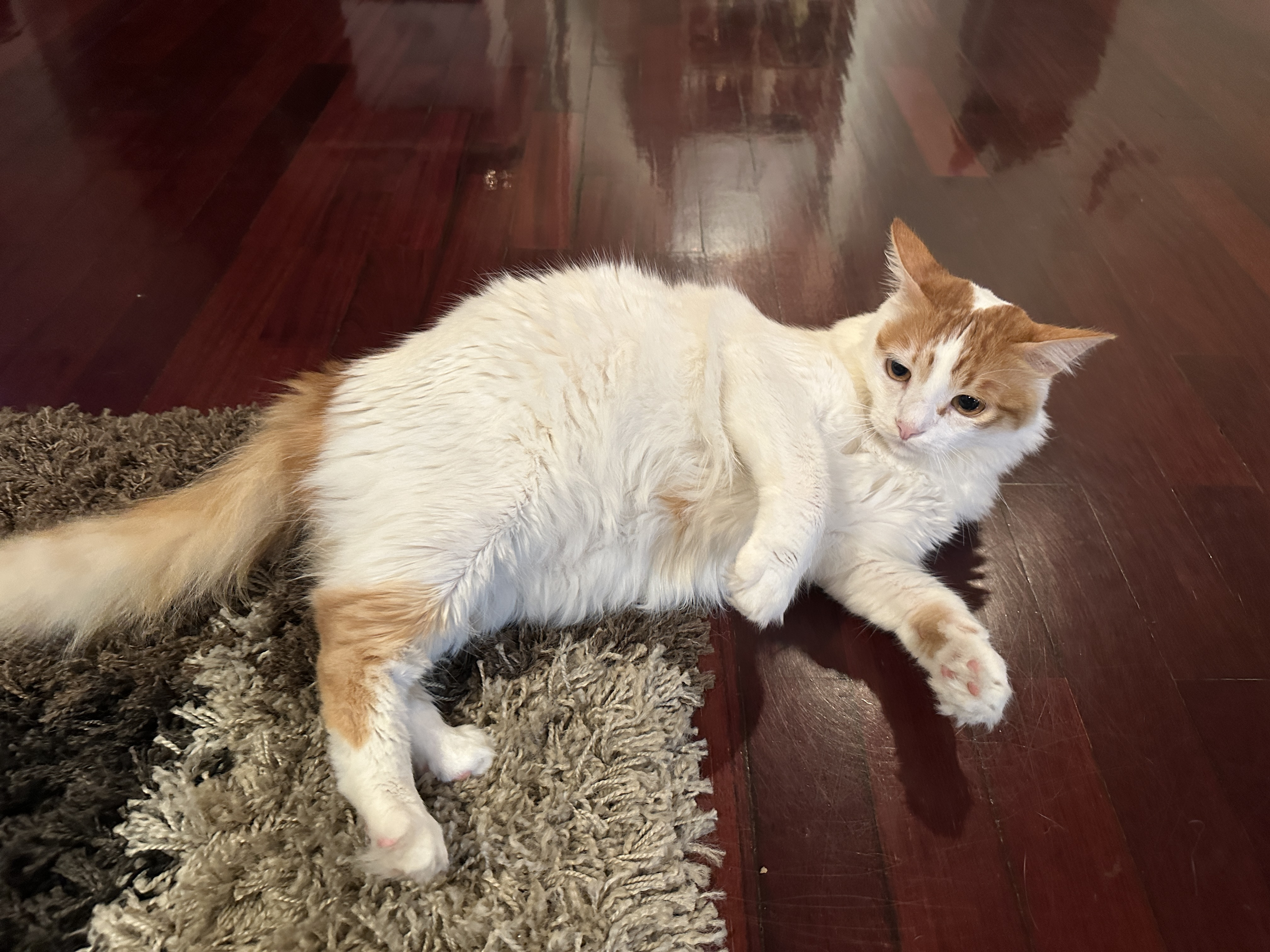
A van-patterned red tabby-and-white Turkish Van cat

Van-patterned cats are bicolor cats, they are mostly white (generally more than 75% white). They have color around their ears and tail, separated by white coloring. They may have small (roughly coin sized) colored spots on and around their spine. This coat pattern type has high-grade white spotting. It ranges from seven to nine on the Bicolor grade chart.

The term Van pattern comes from the Turkish Van (named after Lake Van), which is a Van-patterned bicolor breed.

=== Harlequin ===
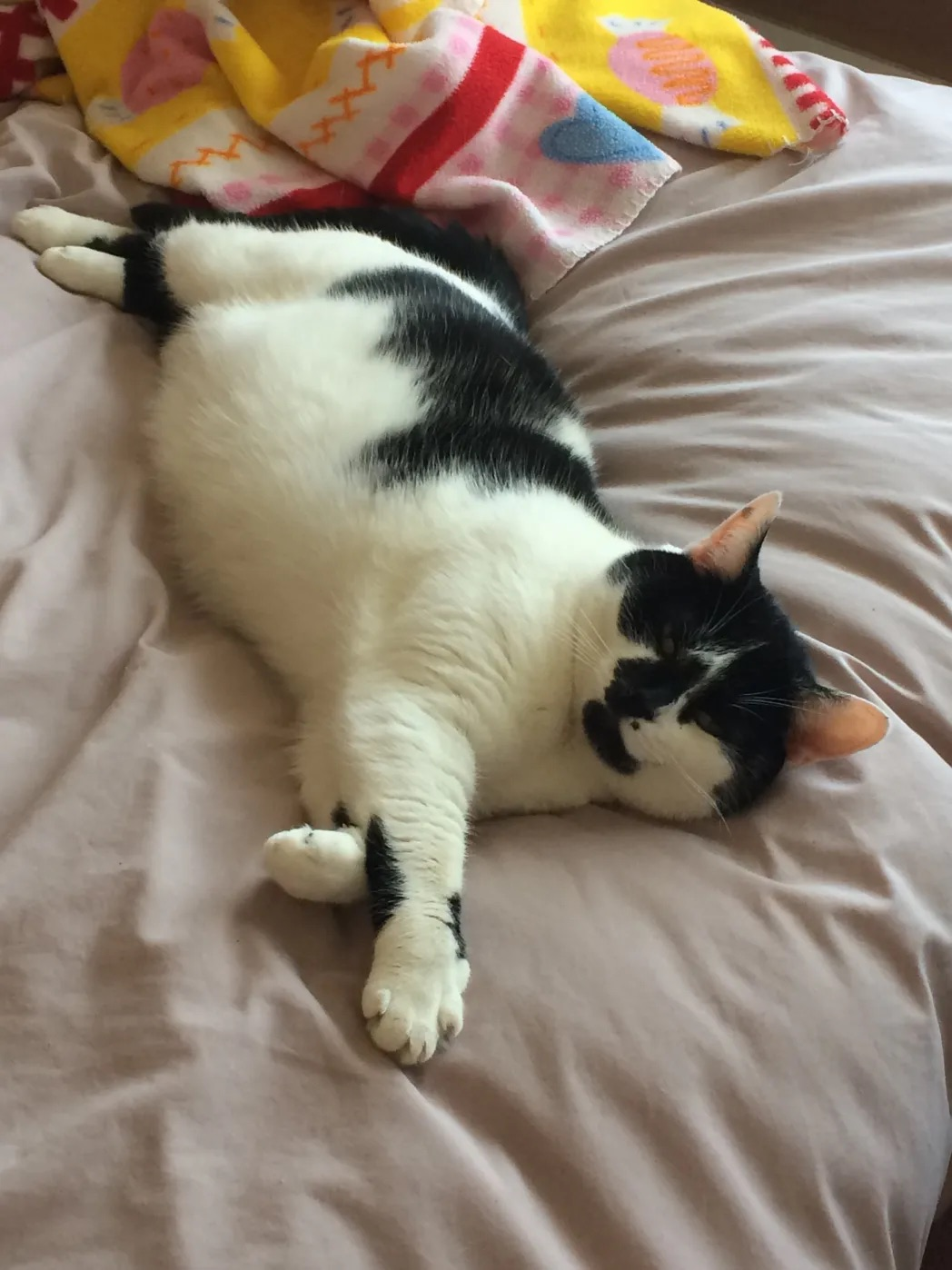
Bi-color cat with a harlequin pattern coat

Another type of color-and-white cat is the harlequin patterned bicolor cat. This coat pattern is sometimes referred to as a cow cat, moo cat, magpie or panda cat and includes the cap-and-saddle and mask-and-mantle patterns. The harlequin patterned coat is predominantly white (generally 50%-75% white) combined with colored markings on the cat's body, including its head and tail. The coat does not have the solid colored "jacket" like the tuxedo coat. Harlequin patterns have multiple, conjoined, or larger spots on the body or an extended head spot that reaches the face. Harlequin coats have large colored patches over a white body, with a colored mask over the head.

=== True bicolor ===
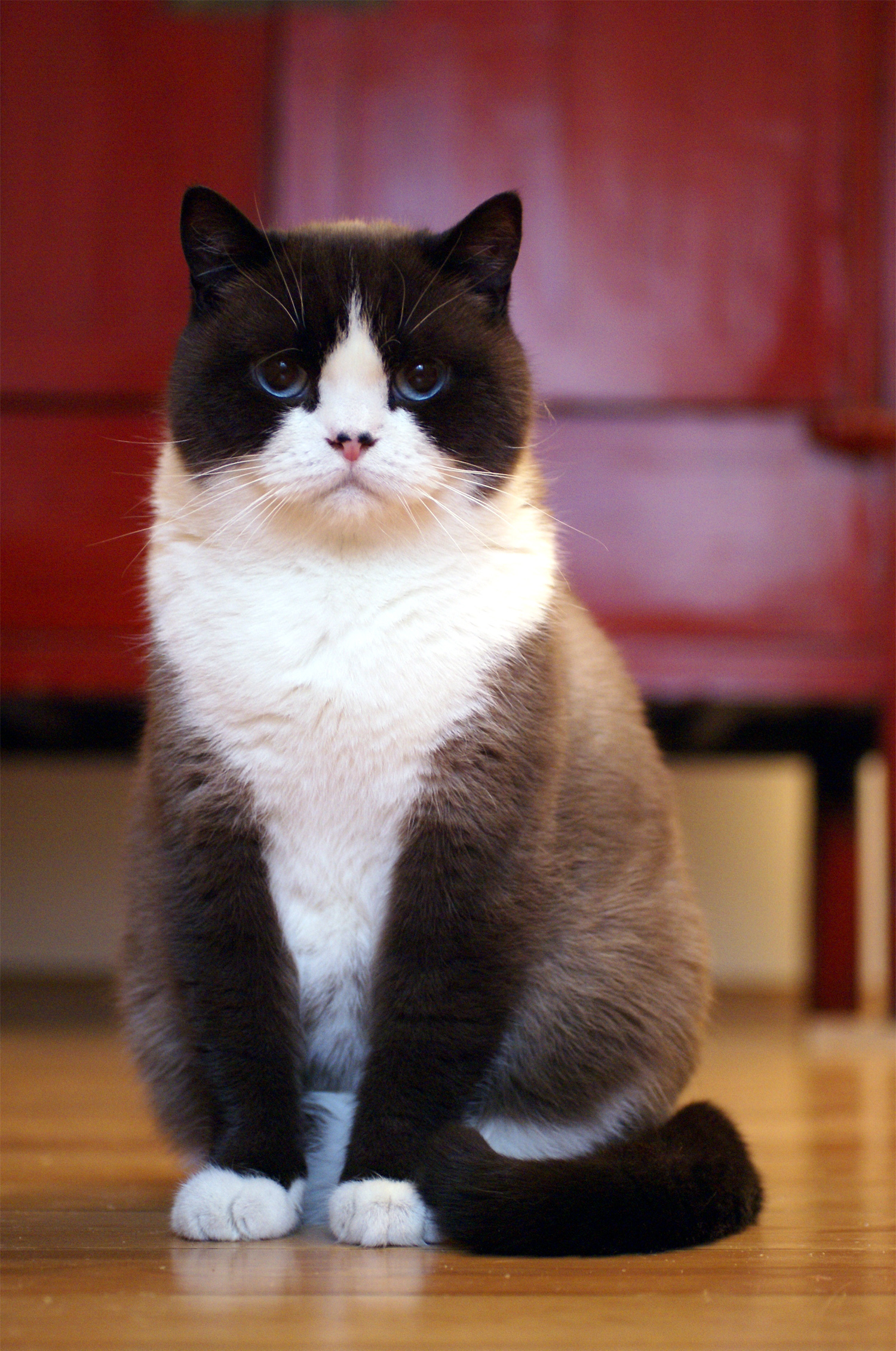
Bicolor patterned black colorpoint-and-white British Shorthair with symmetrical color distribution and a white blaze on its face

The cat labeled "bicolor" or "true bicolor" is the preferred pattern in show-quality bicolor purebred cats. Bicolor patterned cats have medium grade white spotting (generally approximately 50%-25% white). The cat registry Fédération Internationale Féline (FIFe) states that for a "standard" bicolor coat to compete in shows, "The colour patches must be clearly separated from each other, even in colour and harmoniously distributed." They also state "at least 1/2 should be colored, but not more than 3/4; the rest is white." The World Cat Federation (WFC) allows an amount of color between 1/2 up to 2/3 for bicolor patterned cats. The Cat Fanciers' Association (CFA) states, "Cats with no more than a locket and/or button [patch on chest] do not qualify for this color class."

=== Tuxedo ===
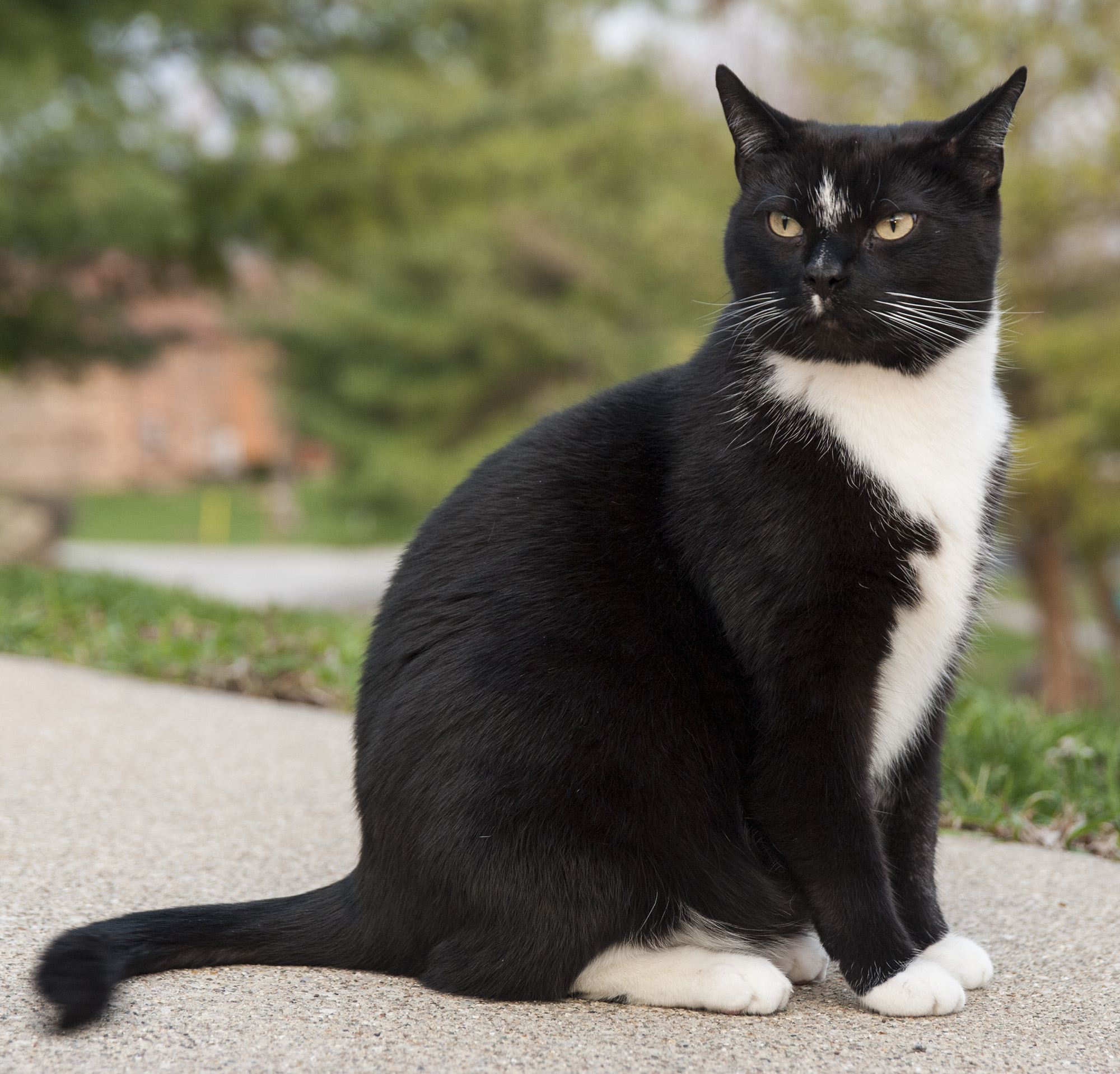
A tuxedo patterned black-and-white cat

A tuxedo cat, Felix cat or Julius cat is a bicolor cat with low-grade white spotting (generally close to 25% white) in the coat. The term "tuxedo cats" is typically used for black-and-white colored cats, but tuxedo patterned cats come in all cat colors. They are called tuxedo cats due to the resemblance to the black-tie formal wear of the same name; however, the origins of the term "tuxedo cat" are murky at best, with linguist Cecily Raysor Hancock having been only able to track the term back to the early 1980s in America.

To be considered a true tuxedo cat, the feline's coloring should consist of a colored coat, with white fur limited to the paws, belly, chest, throat, often the chin, and sometimes the tail. Tuxedo cats can appear to have goatees due to the white coloration of their nose or chin.

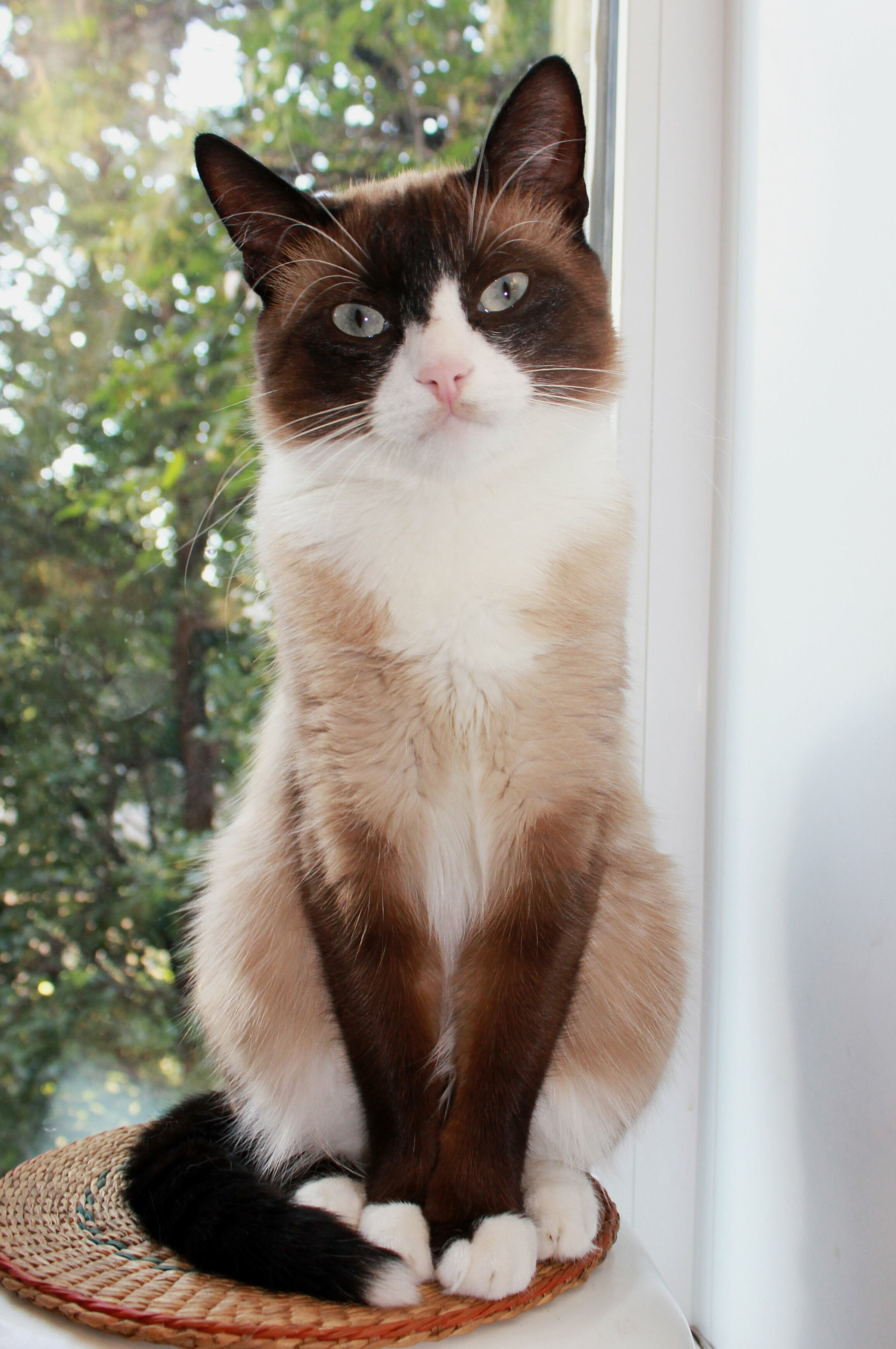
A Snowshoe cat showing the Snowshoe pattern

In most cat registries, the tuxedo pattern is not an official term used to categorize white spotting patterns in show cats. The standard or code used to indicate the white markings in the Snowshoe cat breed is equal to the white spotting pattern known as "tuxedo" among tuxedo cat enthusiasts.

== Genetics of coat patterns ==
The basic colors and patterns of cat fur are defined by fewer than ten genes. Cats with white color in their coats are thought to have a mutant white-spotting gene that prevents the formation of coat color in patches over the cat's body. This gene has been investigated in several species, particularly mice, and is co-dominant to normal coat color as it prevents the migration of melanocytes into the developing hair follicles. The genetics of this pattern are not as well understood in cats but at least some of the genes involved in melanocyte migration and survival may play a role similar as in other animals.

Three genotypes possible with the S (white spotting) gene, with capital S standing for a wild-type copy and lower-case s standing for the mutant.

- SS (two dominant alleles) results in high grades of white spotting (sometimes resulting in a solid-looking white cat or a white cat with just a few color hairs)
- Ss (one dominant, one recessive allele) results in medium grades of white spotting
- ss (two recessive alleles) results in solid color or low grades of white spotting (sometimes as little as a few white hairs)

The lack of tabby striping in bicolor cats is controlled by the agouti protein, which inhibits the production of melanin and thus prevents the formation of dark hair colors. In agouti cats the gene is turned on and off as the hair grows, producing hairs with alternating stripes yellow and black. In domestic cats, inactivation of the agouti gene by a deletion mutation causes all-black coat color.

=== Bicolored cat breeds ===
The bicolor coat coloration is not restricted to a specific breed of cat. However, some breeds have bicolor coats in their breed standards. These include the Ragdoll, American Shorthair, Manx, British Shorthair, and Turkish Angora. The Turkish Van and Snowshoe cat breed are restricted to cats with bicolored coats.

In contrast, other common breeds of cat have specific coat patterns specified in their breed standards. Cats with such specific coat patterns include the Russian Blue, which has a coat of one solid color.

=== Possible bicolor colorations ===
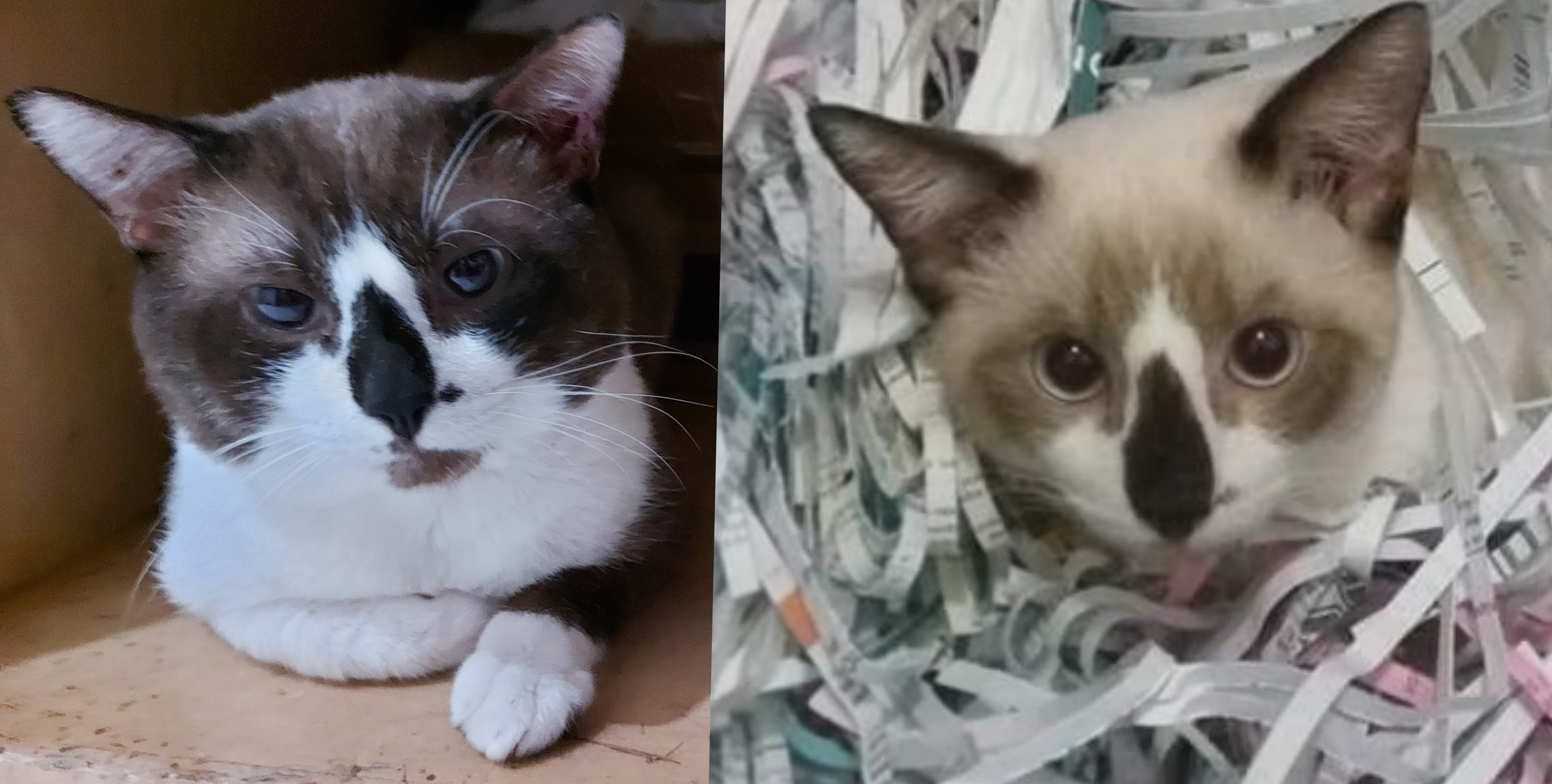
Comparison of a black colorpoint-and-white adult (left) and kitten (right)

White spotting is not limited to solid color-and-white combinations, and can also occur with any of the tabby patterns, resulting in tabby-and-white bicolor coats. Colorpoint cats can have bicolor points (colorpoint-and-white), although this variation is not recognized for showing in some cat breeds. An example of a bicolor colorpoint cat breed is the tuxedo patterned colorpoint-and-white Snowshoe cat. The body markings of bicolor colorpoints become clearer with age, as the body fur of colorpoint cats darkens as the cats grow older and the white patches become more distinctively visible.

White spotting can also occur in combination with tortoiseshell coats, these are known as tricolor cats, tortoiseshell-and-white cats, or calico cats (US English). Tortoiseshell-and-white cats can also be found in combination with a tabby or colorpoint pattern.

Bicolor cats that are black and white are sometimes called magpies.

=== Skin coloration ===
Bicolor may also appear in the skin color. Paw pad coloration may be black, pink, or a mixture of both. Paw pad coloration may match the pattern of a cat's coat that is nearby the paw.

== Notable bicolor cats ==
- Félicette, the first cat in space
- Palmerston, a black-and-white bicolor who was Chief Mouser of the UK Foreign & Commonwealth Office, Whitehall, London, 2016–2020
- Socks Clinton (1989–2009), the pet cat of the family of former US President Bill Clinton
