= One Small Step: The Story of the Space Chimps =

2008 documentary film

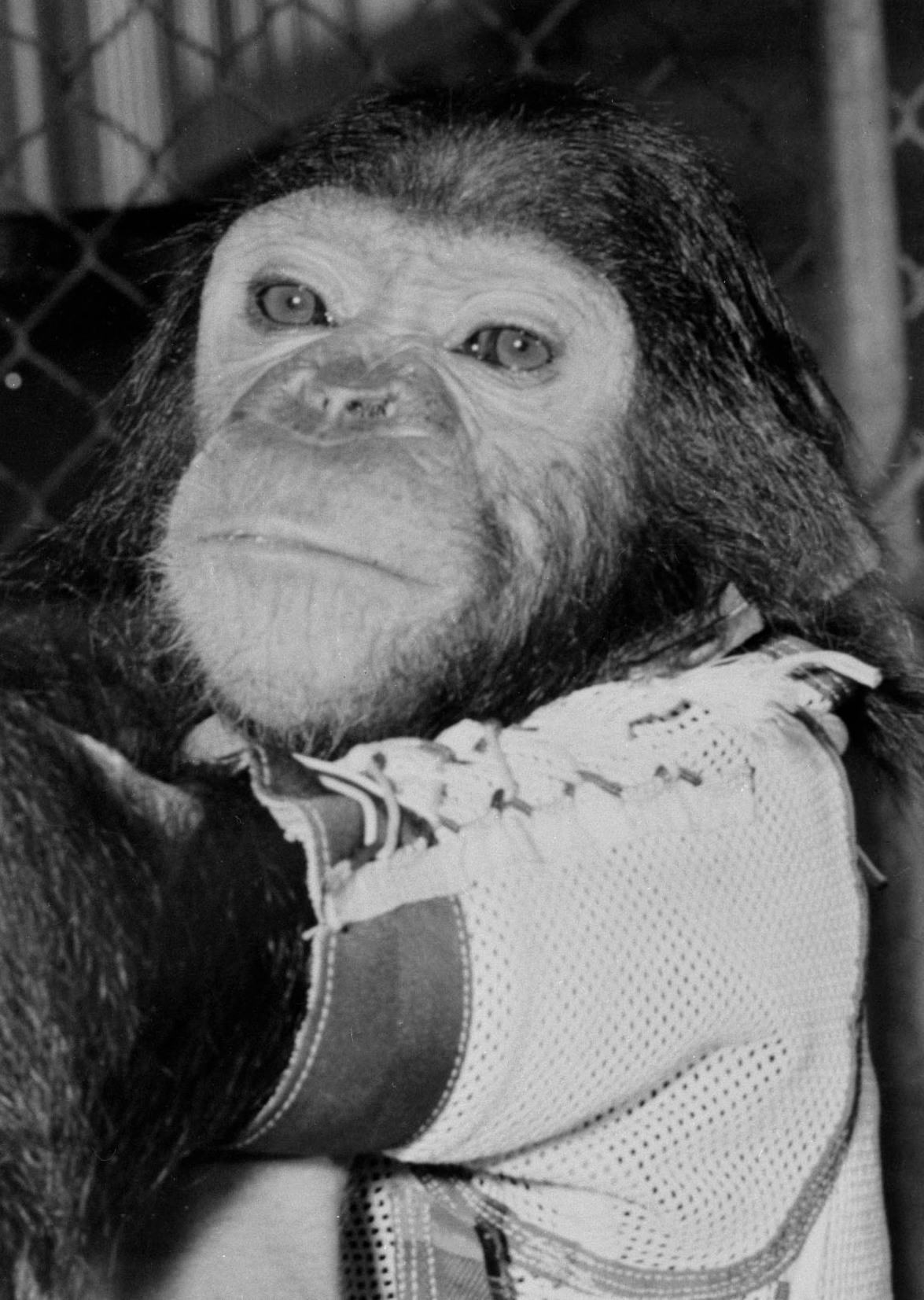
During the November 29, 1961, NASA Mercury-Atlas 5 flight, Enos became the only chimpanzee and third primate to orbit Earth

One Small Step: The Story of the Space Chimps is a 2003 documentary film produced and directed by David Cassidy and Kristin Davy that aired on History Channel UK and CBC Television. The film chronicles the real story behind the early use of chimpanzees in space exploration. The film was released on DVD in April 2008, after several delays.

== Release ==
One Small Step: The Story of the Space Chimps is a documentary that screened in over 20 film festivals including the Maryland Film Festival, the Vancouver International Film Festival, and the Hot Springs Documentary Film Festival, before airing on television and being released on DVD.

== Plot ==
Told through archival photos and footage, space historians, testimony from the chimpanzees' trainers, and through the people who fought for the space chimpanzees' peaceful retirement, the film explores the compelling journey of the United States Air Force space from their primate predecessors and early rocket tests to Ham and Enos as they made their ground breaking missions into space.

The story reveals the space chimpanzees' triumphs and tragedies and brings to light the virtually unknown account of how the colony was rewarded for their long and challenging service to NASA, the Air Force, and the United States.

Featured in the documentary are interviews with Dr. Carole Noon who heads up the Save the Chimps sanctuary, Dr. Jane Goodall, and archival footage of President John F. Kennedy's famous 1962 space exploration speech "We choose to go to the Moon". The film also recounts the stories of many early primate missions including those of Able and Baker, and Gordo.

== See also ==
- Animals in space
- Monkeys and apes in space
- "One small step", title namesake, 1969 quote by Neil Armstrong
