= Miami Rare Bird Farm =

The Miami Rare Bird Farm was a seven acre tourist attraction and breeding farm that was active from 1938 to 1961. Owned by Alton Freeman, the farm bought, bred, and sold a variety of common and exotic animals throughout its existence.

The Miami Rare Bird Farm offered animals for purchase as pets, zoo exhibits, and even as an astronaut. The farm was known for "the world's weirdest menu" required to feed the animals, but also that the tourism was "just a sideline" to the real business, selling animals. The farm sold squirrel and spider monkeys to Fejervary Park to be used in their Monkey Island. Ringtail monkeys, woolly monkeys, and a baby ocelot were sold in the local newspaper. Plenty of profit was still made by the tourism, but the farm was most known for their animals who went on to become famous.

== Famous successes ==
Enos, a chimpanzee who made the first U.S. orbital space flight on November 29, 1961. According to the Miami Rare Bird Farm, Eno had been purshased there in 1960. However, ten of the 14 chimps purchased from the shop ended up dying during quarantine.

Birds and other animals from the farm were featured in films such as On an Island with You, The Barefoot Mailman, and more.

Not all of the residents of the Miami Rare Bird Farm were well known for positive reasons. Tourists found that some macaws had learned how to make mischief, stealing keys, turning on water taps, and flipping on light switches. And that was only the trouble that happened on the farm's property.

== Infamous incidents ==
A kangaroo escaped the farm and hopped down Flagler Boulevard until an employee of Miami Rare Bird Farm that it liked, Frankie, coaxed it into the back of a pickup truck and brought it home.

Traffic was backed up on several miles of Dixie Highway because a group of penguins were waddling across it.

Several red-whiskered bulbuls imported from India escaped in 1961 and established themselves in South Florida, where they "unwittingly helped in spreading seeds of the non-native and noxious Brazilian Pepper". A large population of the bulbuls still thrives in South Florida.

The Miami Rare Bird Farm closed in 1961.
