= Enos (chimpanzee) =

Chimpanzee that orbitted the Earth

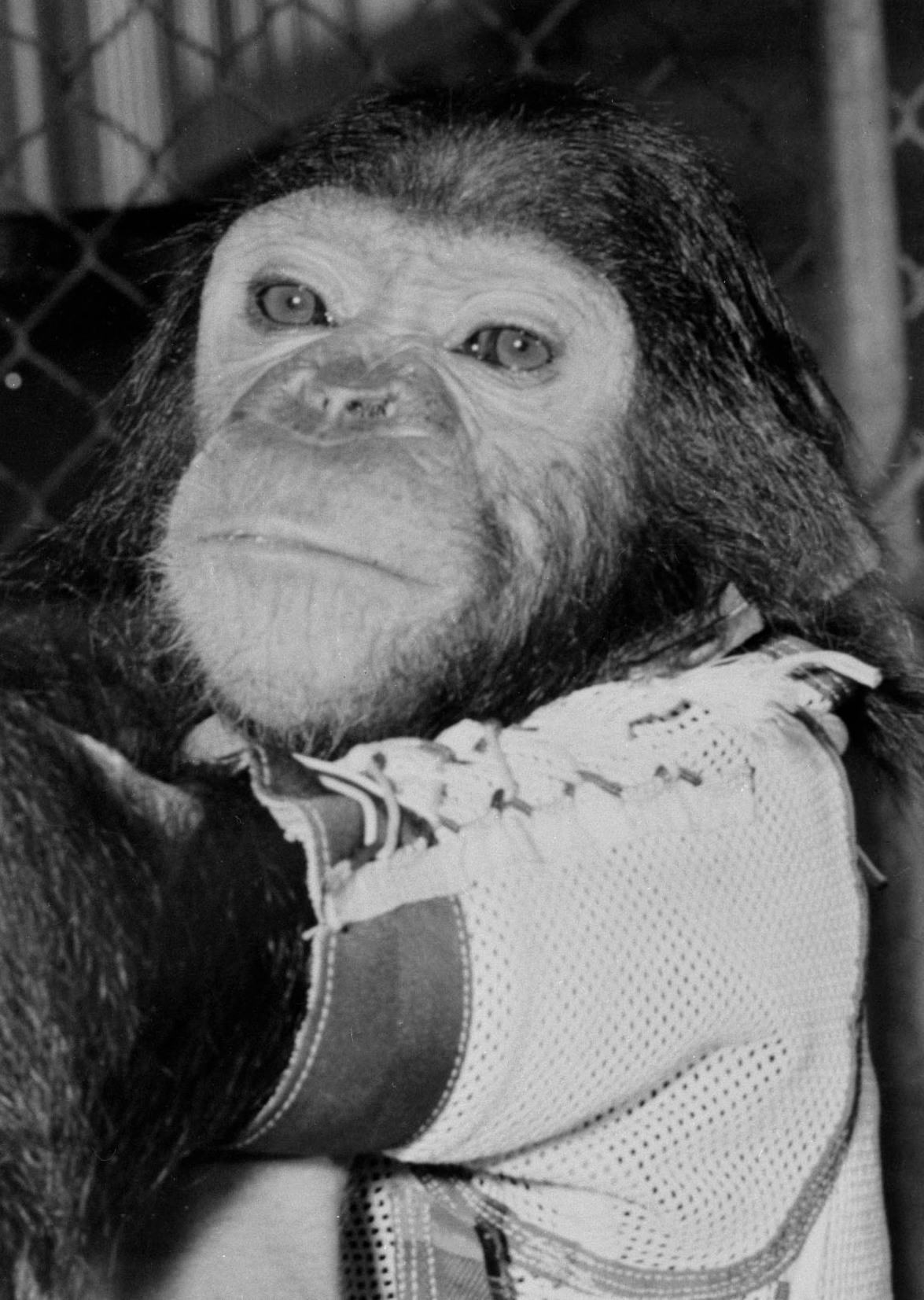
- Enos, the only chimpanzee and third primate to orbit the Earth
- Species: Chimpanzee
- Sex: Male
- Born: 1957
- Died: November 4, 1962 (aged 4–5)
- Employer: NASA
- Notable role: Only chimpanzee to achieve Earth orbit
- Years active: 1960–1962

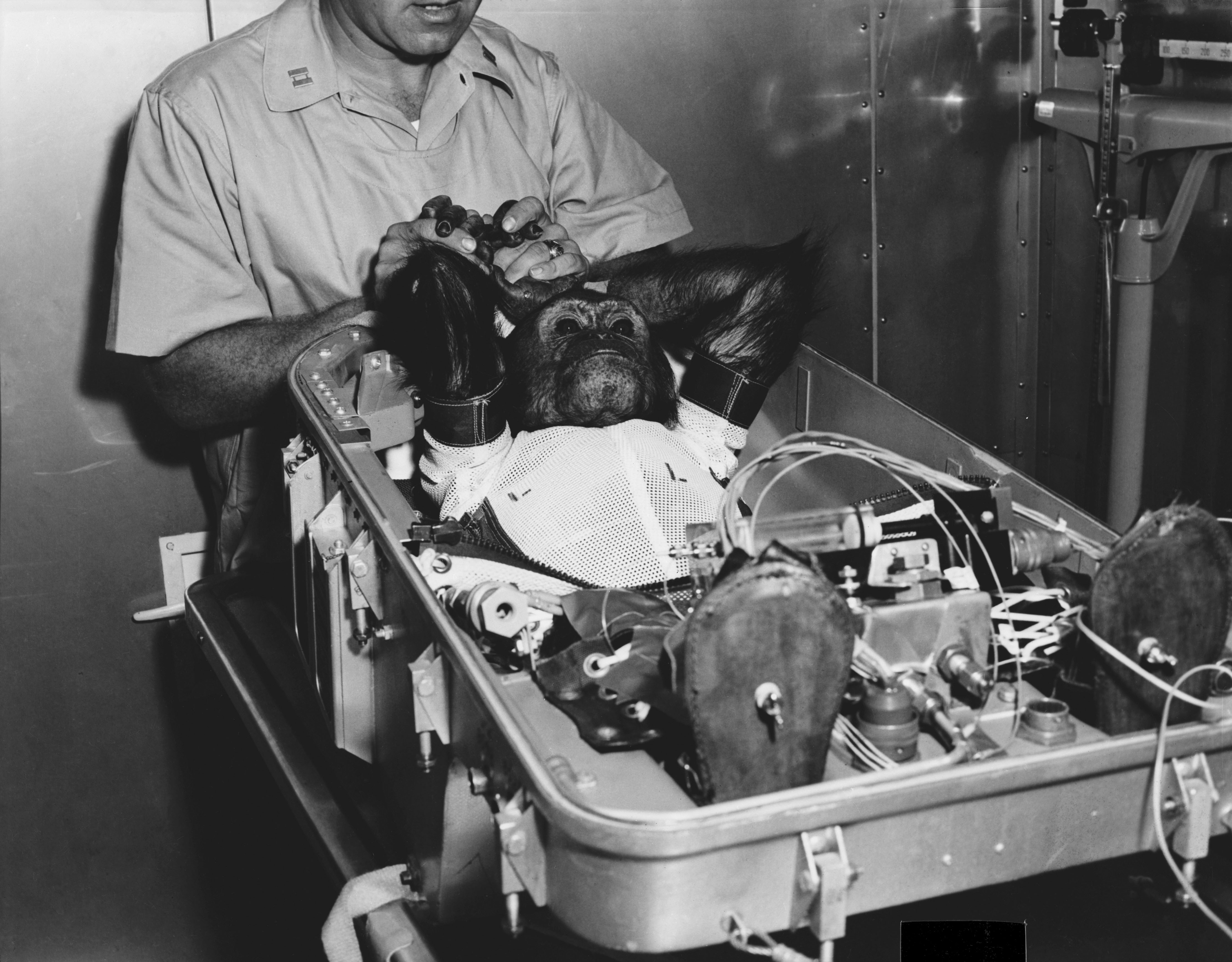
Enos being prepared for insertion into the Mercury-Atlas 5 capsule in 1961.

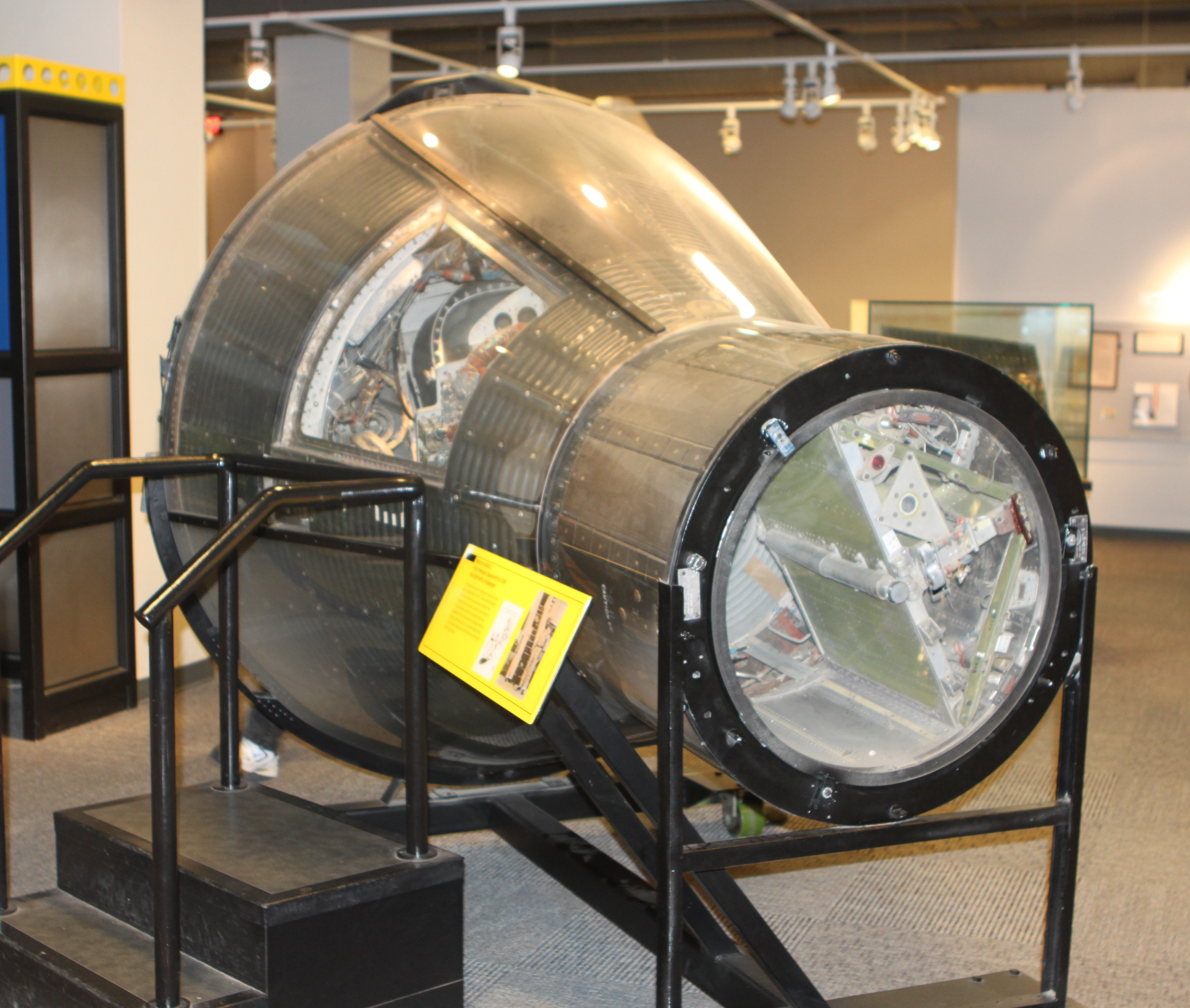
Enos’ space capsule during the Mercury-Atlas 5 mission, on display at the Museum of Life and Science, in Durham, North Carolina

Enos (c. 1957 – November 4, 1962) was a chimpanzee launched into space by NASA on November 29, 1961, following his predecessor Ham. He was the only chimpanzee to orbit the Earth and the third hominid and primate to do so after cosmonauts Yuri Gagarin and Gherman Titov.

Enos was brought from the Miami Rare Bird Farm on April 3, 1960. He completed more than 1,250 training hours at the University of Kentucky and Holloman Air Force Base. He was selected for his Project Mercury flight only three days before launch. Two months prior, NASA launched Mercury-Atlas 4 on September 13, 1961, to conduct an identical mission with a "crewman simulator" on board. Enos flew into space aboard Mercury-Atlas 5 on November 29, 1961. He completed his first orbit in 1 hour and 28.5 minutes.

Enos was scheduled to complete three orbits, but the mission was aborted after two due to capsule overheating and malfunctioning tech that gave him 76 electrical shocks. According to one history of primatology, "The chimpanzee, about five years old, behaved like a true hero: despite the malfunctions of the electronic system, he conscientiously performed all the tasks he had learned during the entire flight of over three hours...Enos demonstrated that he was careful to successfully complete his mission and that he perfectly understood what was expected of him."

After his space capsule made an ocean landing, Enos "had become angry and frustrated at the three-hour wait" before being retrieved by U.S. Navy seamen.

The capsule was brought aboard USS Stormes in the late afternoon and Enos was immediately taken below deck by his Air Force handlers. Stormes then dropped Enos at the Kindley Air Force Base hospital in Bermuda, where he was found to be in good shape. On December 1, 1961 Enos left Bermuda for Cape Canaveral, and eventually Holloman Air Force Base.

Enos's flight was a full dress rehearsal for the next Mercury launch on February 20, 1962, which would make John Glenn the first American to orbit Earth.

Some sources state that Enos was nicknamed "the Penis," due to his frequent fondling of himself, but Mary Roach researched this for her book Packing for Mars and concluded that Enos earned this nickname by being difficult to work with, not by masturbating excessively.

On November 4, 1962, Enos died of shigellosis-related dysentery, which was resistant to then-known antibiotics. He was constantly observed for two months before his death. Pathologists reported no symptoms that could be attributed or related to his previous space flight. Some sources say his body was sent to the Smithsonian. But when the authors of Animals in Space: From Research Rockets to the Space Shuttle, researched this question, they concluded that his remains were simply discarded. The Air Force did not erect a permanent memorial for Enos, which it eventually did for Ham.

== See also ==
- Monkeys and apes in space
- Albert II, first monkey and first primate in space, suborbital flight, June 14, 1949
- Little Joe 2 flight with Sam, Project Mercury rhesus monkey
- Ham (chimpanzee), first chimpanzee in space, suborbital flight, January 31, 1961
- Animals in space
- List of individual apes
- One Small Step: The Story of the Space Chimps: (2008 documentary)
- Félicette, first cat in space
