= Félicette =

Only cat launched into space (died 1963)

- Image of Félicette with the implanted electrode visible on her forehead; inscription: "Thank you for your participation in my success of 18 October 1963"
- Other name: C 341
- Species: Felis catus
- Sex: Female
- Died: 1963
- Nationality: France
- Occupation: Astronaut
- Known for: The only cat launched into space
- Owner: French government
- Weight: 2.5 kg (5.5 lb)
- Appearance: Tuxedo cat
- Named after: Felix the Cat

Félicette (French pronunciation: [felisɛt]; died 1963) was a Parisian cat that became the first feline launched into space on 18 October 1963 as part of the French space program. She was one of 14 female cats trained for spaceflight. The cats had electrodes implanted into their skulls to monitor their neurological activity throughout the flight. During the flight, electrical impulses were applied to the brain and a leg to stimulate responses. The capsule was recovered 13 minutes after the rocket was ignited. Most of the data from the mission was of good quality, and Félicette survived the flight but was euthanised two months later for the examination of her brain.

Félicette was designated C 341 before the flight, and after the flight, the media gave her the name Félix, after Felix the Cat. Centre d'Enseignement et de Recherches de Médecine Aéronautique (CERMA) modified this to the feminine Félicette and adopted it as her official name. Postage stamps worldwide commemorated her, and a statue with her likeness is on display at the International Space University. France's feline biological rocket payloads were preceded by rats and followed by monkeys.

== Background ==
On 14 June 1949, a U.S. suborbital flight carried the first mammal into space, a Rhesus monkey named Albert II. On 3 November 1957, the Soviet Union launched Laika, a stray dog found on the streets of Moscow, into space on Sputnik 2. She died in space but was the first animal to orbit the Earth. Brazilian Army colonel Manuel dos Santos Lage planned to launch a cat named Flamengo aboard the Félix I rocket on 1 January 1959, but the flight was cancelled over ethical concerns regarding the use of a cat. On 31 January 1961, as part of Project Mercury, the chimpanzee Ham became the first hominid launched into space for a suborbital flight. On 29 November 1961, Enos became the second chimpanzee launched into space, and third hominid after cosmonauts Yuri Gagarin and Gherman Titov, to achieve Earth orbit.

The French rocket program began in 1961. Flights of the Véronique rocket had been reinstated in 1959 and were run by the Comité des Recherches Spatiales (CRS). France's base in the Sahara launched a rat named Hector on 22 February 1961, causing France to become the third country to launch animals into space. Hector had electrodes implanted on his skull so neurological activity could be monitored. Two rockets with rat payloads followed on 15 and 18 October. French scientists wanted to use larger mammals and chose cats since they already had significant neurological data.

== Mission ==
=== Selection and training ===
In 1963, Centre d'Enseignement et de Recherches de Médecine Aéronautique (CERMA) purchased 14 cats from a pet dealer for testing, with the individual animals selected based on their temperament; all of the cats were female, for their calmer demeanor. The cats were unnamed before the launch to reduce the likelihood that the scientists would become attached to them. All of the cats had permanent electrodes surgically implanted into their brain to assess neurological activity. Some of the cats' spaceflight training was similar to training for humans. This was carried out by CERMA and included using the high-G centrifuge three-axis chair with simulated rocket noise. Cat-specific training included confinement in their container and experience withstanding the restraint cloth. The animals trained for about two months; this limit was set by the risk of electrode polarization.

=== Flight ===
The crew began preparing at the launch site on 8 October 1963. On 11 October, the heading beacon was tested by placing it in a helicopter and tracking it with ground stations. On the 12th, the telemetry in the nose cone was unsuccessfully tested, followed by a successful test the next day. There were issues testing the homing beacon on the 14th and 15th, but all electronics functioned satisfactorily on 16 October.

On 17 October, six feline finalists were selected as candidates for the flight, and a tuxedo cat with the designation C 341 was chosen for the flight on launch day, along with a backup. Weighing in at 2.5 kilograms (5.5 lb), C 341 was selected as the best of the six finalists due to her calm demeanor and appropriate weight. Electrodes were attached to her forward left and right rear leg to monitor cardiac activity. Nine electrodes had previously been implanted on her skull: two in the front sinus, one in the somatic area, two in the ventral hippocampal, two in the reticular area, and two in the association cortex. Two electrodes were glued to a foreleg so electrical impulses could be used to stimulate them during the flight. Two microphones, one on her chest and one on the nose cone of the rocket, monitored her breathing. The launch vehicle used was the Véronique AGI 47 sounding rocket, made in Vernon, Haute-Normandie. The Véronique rocket came from the German World War II Aggregate rocket family, developed for International Geophysical Year (French: Année géophysique internationale) in 1957 for biological research.

On 18 October 1963 at 8:09 am, C 341 was launched into space from the Centre interarmées d'essais d'engins spéciaux site in Algeria. The mission was a sub-orbital flight and lasted 13 minutes. The rocket engine burned for 42 seconds on ascent and C 341 experienced 9.5 g of acceleration. The nose cone separated from the rocket before reaching a height of 152 kilometres (94 miles) and the cat was subjected to five minutes of weightlessness. Prior to parachute deployment, spin and vibration on the nose cone caused 7 g of acceleration. The parachutes deployed 8 minutes and 55 seconds into the launch, applying 9 g. Thirteen minutes after the rocket was ignited, a helicopter arrived at the payload. C 341 was recovered safely, and the mission made her the first cat to reach space.

=== Results and aftermath ===
High-quality data was recorded throughout the flight, other than the reticular measurements and data recorded during reentry. Electrical shocks were administered to C 341 at a higher rate than intended. She was vigilant during the ascent phase due to being a payload in a rocket. Her heart rate slowed during the microgravity phase, and her breathing became nominal. The turbulent reentry caused her heart rate to rise, but poor data made it difficult to analyze. The flight's biological data were given to the media, who named C 341 "Félix" after the Félix the Cat cartoon series. CERMA changed it to the feminine Félicette and adopted the name as official. Félicette was euthanized two months after the launch so that scientists could perform a necropsy to examine her brain.

The French launched a second cat into space on 24 October. An explosive bolt that would release the rocket from the launch pad failed to function, causing the rocket to launch at an extreme angle. The radio transponder stopped working on the launch pad, which created difficulties in finding the rocket. A helicopter spotted the parachute but could not land, so the agency dispatched ground vehicles. They were unable to get past some barbed wire. The next day, a helicopter was again dispatched and was able to land at the site. The nose cone where the payload was housed was heavily damaged, and the cat had died.

Of the remaining 12 cats that were trained, the fate of 11 is known. One cat's health deteriorated after the electrode surgery, so the scientists removed them. The group adopted her as their mascot and named her Scoubidou, as she had a scoubidou braid around her neck, a popular style at the time. The other nine cats were euthanized at the end of the program.

France continued its biological payload research, changing to monkeys. A monkey known as Martine was launched on 7 March 1967 and Pierrette six days later. They were both successfully recovered. France concluded biological payload research at the national level with these flights but later worked on biological payloads with the Soviet Union in the 1970s.

== Legacy ==
According to an article in Space.com on 8 November 2017, the participation of Félicette in the space race "... was certainly not voluntary, but it was a huge milestone for France, which had just established the world's third civilian space agency (after the Soviet Union and the U.S.). Félicette's mission helped bring France into the space race." Félicette's flight was much less popular than other spaceflights at the time. Burgess and Dubbs believe this is due to photos of her with electrodes implanted on her skull and the new animal rights movement.

Former French colonies have created stamps to commemorate Félicette's flight. Comoros released a stamp in 1992 as one of a series of stamps featuring animals involved in spaceflight; the stamp used the name Félix. In 1997, postage stamps commemorating Félicette and other animals in space were issued in Chad, again using the name Félix. A 1999 stamp in Niger also used Félix.

The UPS student astronomy club at Université Toulouse III will name its future astronomical observatory in honor of Félicette. It will be the first French observatory entirely managed by students and was due to open in 2021. The 500 mm Dall-Kirkham telescope (3500 mm focal length) will be housed in a motorized dome 3.90 m in diameter.

=== Memorial statue ===
Unlike some other non-human animals which traveled in space—the chimpanzee Ham was buried at the International Space Hall of Fame in New Mexico, U.S., and the Soviet dog Laika has a bronze monument at the Yuri Gagarin Cosmonaut Training Center, near Star City in Russia—Félicette had no monument until Matthew Serge Guy began a crowdfunding campaign in 2017 to erect a bronze statue of Félicette to commemorate her contribution to science. The statue was designed by sculptor Gill Parker. The preliminary design depicted a cat on top of the Earth, and a plaque featuring the names of significant donors was to be included. In April 2018, the project met its £40,000 funding target.

In April 2019, Guy announced that the statue was to be located in Eastern France at the International Space University. The statue was unveiled on 18 December 2019, as a part of the 25th anniversary celebration of the University's Master of Space Studies program. It is 1.5-metre (5 ft) tall and depicts Félicette "perched atop Earth, gazing up toward the skies she once traveled". Guy wrote in a Kickstarter update, "It's crazy to think a video I put online ... has resulted in this. The internet's an alright place sometimes."

== See also ==
- Bioastronautics
- List of individual cats
- List of microorganisms tested in outer space
- Monkeys and apes in space
- Soviet space dogs
- Zond 5, the first animals to circle the Moon (tortoises and insects)
- Fee, Fi, Fo, Fum, and Phooey, mice who orbited the Moon on Apollo 17 and were euthanized for research purposes upon their return

== Sources ==
- Burgess, Colin; Dubbs, Chris (2007). Animals in Space: From Research Rockets to the Space Shuttle. Springer Praxis. ISBN 978-0-387-36053-9.
- Dougherty, K.; Jung, P.; Serra, Jean-Jacques (October 2018). "Félicette, the only space cat". International Astronautical Congress.
- Reuter, Claus (2000). The V2 and the German, Russian and American Rocket Program. German Canadian Museum. p. 87. ISBN 978-1-894643-05-4.
