= Lunlun =

Lunlun is a feminine name.

- Lunlun Zou, a Chinese musician
- Hana no Ko Lunlun, an anime series
- Dual! Parallel Trouble Adventure, also known as Dual! Parallel Lunlun Monogatari
- Lun Lun, a famous giant panda at Atlanta Zoo in Atlanta, Georgia
- Lunlun (VTuber), a Japanese animal VTuber.
