= List of guzheng players =

List of players of the Chinese zither, or guzheng

The following is a list of notable guzheng players in alphabetical order. (Note that in Chinese, the order is surname first followed by given name. See Chinese names.) The guzheng or zheng is a Chinese musical instrument (specifically a zither) with movable bridges.

- Alan Walker
- Chen Huiqing (陈惠清)
- Chen Meilin (陈美霖)
- Chen Xiyao (陈希垚)
- Barbie Chien
- Bradley Fish
- Jiang Nan (江南)
- Mei Han (韩梅)
- Lou Harrison
- Bei Bei He (荷蓓蓓)
- Mike Hovancsek
- Cynthia Hsiang (向新梅)
- Jaron Lanier
- Liang Tsai-Ping (梁在平, Liang Zaiping) (c.1910–2000)
- Zi Lan Liao
- Liu Fang (劉芳)
- Liu Weishan (劉維姍)
- Fiona Sze-Lorrain
- Luo Jing (罗晶)
- Ma Li (马丽)
- Onette du Joyeux
- David Sait
- Buedi Siebert
- Andreas Vollenweider
- Tan Su-Hui, Sophy (陈素慧)
- Yijia Tu (涂议嘉)
- Wang Changyuan (王昌元)
- Wang Yong (王勇)
- Wang Zhongshan (王中山)
- Winnie Wong(黄凯筠)
- Wu Fei (吴非)
- Vi An Diep
- Bing Xia (夏冰)
- Xu Fengxia
- Xu Lingzi (许菱子)
- Yan Xijia (严希佳)
- Mindy Meng Wang
- Yu Jun
- Zimeimei (子媚)
- Lunlun Zou (邹伦伦)
