= Weishan =

Weishan may refer to:

== Places ==
- Weishan Yi and Hui Autonomous County (巍山彝族回族自治县), Yunnan
- Weishan County, Shandong (微山县)
  - Weishan Lake (微山湖)
- Weishan, Zhejiang (巍山镇), town in Dongyang
- Weishan Township, Ningxiang (沩山乡), Hunan
- Weishan Town, Liling (沩山镇), Hunan
- Weishan, Xinhua (维山乡), Hunan

== People ==
- Weishan Liu, Chinese–American guzheng player
- Michael Weishan, American TV host
- Zheng Weishan (1915–2000), Chinese general and politician
- Wu Weishan (born 1962), Chinese curator and academic
