= 美川 =

美川, meaning "beautiful river", may refer to:

In the Mandarin Chinese reading Měichuān:

- Proposed name for Zoo Atlanta panda eventually named Xi Lan

In the Korean reading Micheon:

- Micheon of Goguryeo (fl. 300–331), 15th ruler of Goguryeo

In the Japanese reading Mikawa:

- Mikawa, Ehime, former town in Japan (merged in 2004)
- Mikawa, Ishikawa, former town in Japan (merged in 2005)
  - Mikawa Station (Ishikawa), JR West railway station on the Hokuriku main line
- Mikawa, Yamaguchi, former town in Japan (merged in 2006)
- Kenichi Mikawa (born 1946), Japanese singer and television personality
