= Ozzie (gorilla) =

Oldest recorded male gorilla (1961–2022)

- Other name: Ozoum
- Species: Western lowland gorilla
- Sex: Male
- Born: c. 1961; Central Africa
- Died: January 25, 2022 (aged 60–61); Zoo Atlanta, Georgia, U.S.
- Known for: Oldest recorded male gorilla in captivity
- Offspring: 12
- Weight: 350 lb (160 kg)

Ozoum, commonly referred to as Ozzie (c. 1961 – January 25, 2022), was an African-born western lowland gorilla (Gorilla gorilla gorilla) who was a subject of research at the Yerkes National Primate Research Center in the U.S. state of Georgia from 1964 until 1988, when he was transferred to Zoo Atlanta. In 2009, he was the first gorilla to "volunteer" for a blood pressure test. Before his death at age 60, he was the oldest recorded male gorilla in captivity.

== Life ==
Ozoum, commonly referred to as Ozzie, was a western lowland gorilla born in Africa circa 1961. He was caught on June 1, 1963. At the estimated age of 3, Ozoum arrived at the Yerkes National Primate Research Center on April 23, 1964. In the 1970s, he was part of self-recognition studies. In 1971, Ozoum was a subject in a quantitative study of antigenic determinants of red blood cells. Beginning in October 1971, Ozoum was the subject of reproductive behavior research.

In 1988, Ozzie was moved to the Ford African Rainforest at Zoo Atlanta. After transferring to Zoo Atlanta, Ozoum continued to be the subject of behavioral studies. Ozzie was a subject in a heart disease study at Zoo Atlanta. In 2009, he learned how to take his own blood pressure by inserting his arm in a sphygmomanometer (blood pressure cuff), becoming the first gorilla to voluntarily do so. This took place after receiving months of training by zookeepers and researchers from Georgia Tech and Emory University. Ozzie communicated with zoo staff through vocalizations and raps on doors and windows.

By 2013, Ozzie had twelve children, nine grandchildren, and two great-grandchildren.

On June 20, 2021, the zoo celebrated Ozzie's 60th birthday, making him the oldest male gorilla in captivity. He weighed 350 lb (160 kg). In September 2021, Ozzie tested positive for COVID-19.

Ozzie had heart disease and arthritis. He died on January 25, 2022, after experiencing facial swelling, weakness, and loss of appetite. Zoo Atlanta president and CEO Raymond B. King stated "Ozzie's life's contributions are indelible, in the generations of individuals he leaves behind in the gorilla population".

== See also ==
- List of individual apes
