= IPanda =

Chinese animal webcam site

iPanda
- Company type: State-owned media
- Available in: Chinese, English
- Founded: January 2013
- Headquarters: Beijing, {{{location_country}}}
- Parent: CCTV.com
- Website: en.ipanda.com
- Registration: Optional (required to comment)
- Launched: August 6, 2013
- Current status: Active

iPanda is a website featuring live streaming of giant panda reservation sites. The site is launched by China Network Television (CNTV), the Internet branch of China Central Television in August 2013, and collaborating with Chengdu Research Base of Giant Panda Breeding and China Conservation and Research Center for the Giant Panda. The site is available in simplified Chinese and English, aiming to provide a window to observe giant panda's real daily life and to address concerns about endangered species.

== Program ==
=== Livestreaming ===
CNTV has set up more than 30 high definition video cameras in the Chengdu Research Base of Giant Panda Breeding and also Wolong National Nature Reserve. Through those cameras, a group of program directors in the control room are able to observe pandas, and they will select about 20 cameras for 24/7 livestreaming, to ensure the perfect view. On the website, people can get to watch pandas in different stages of life including adult pandas, young pandas and cubs. Registered users can also make comments on the platform below the live streaming.

=== Request programs ===
Taking advantage of the footage captured, program directors will also produce 30-minute request videos everyday in various themes including panda wiki, panda profile, and panda stories. Those request videos will be accessible on the YouTube iPandaChannel and also on other social media platforms including Facebook and Instagram.

=== Documentaries of Pandas ===
A few panda-themed documentaries and feature programs owned by CCTV (China Central Television) can be found on the website for those who want to know more about pandas. At the same time, iPanda.com will produce some elaborate documentaries.

== History ==
On April 11, 2013, in Beijing, Chengdu Research Base of Giant Panda Breeding and CNTV reached an agreement on the establishment of iPanda.com after an official signing ceremony, and they immediately started preparing for the test launch (which was estimated in June, 2013).

On June 24, 2013, after months of preparation, the CNTV tested the launch of the website as planned. As reported by the Xinhuanet, this website "has since attracted nearly 15,000 Internet users to visit and leave comments."

After the two-week inception, the site was finally launched officially and made available worldwide since August 6, 2013.

Realizing the channel's potential, CNTV re-launched this channel with brand-new features in January 2016. This change was to introduce China to the world by revealing all aspects of China besides pandas, and to eventually create a "China Live" platform. For the current English version, a 24 live-streaming of Golden Monkeys (another endangered animal species in China) has been added.

== Success ==
Just four days after its test-launch, the website had "attracted nearly 15,000 Internet users to visit and leave comments", as reported by Xinhua News Agency. In 2013, at the first China Internet Audio-visual Conference (a national-level annual summit), IPanda won the first place for Innovation Models. The site is also making success abroad, which oversea users account for more than 40% of total viewers.

== Criticism ==
However, this channel has also been criticised. The Atlantic calls the site "Giant Panda Reality TV show" and argues that nowadays the China government overemphasized panda's business value, which could possibly have a bad influence on conservation efforts. Other concerns are about Panda Propaganda. Some columnists expressed the view that this big-spending program is part of China's soft power and diplomacy.
