= Ping Ping and Fu Shuang =

Pandas given to the US by Xi Jinping (born 2020)

- Species: Giant panda
- Born: Chengdu Research Base of Giant Panda Breeding, Chengdu, China
- Residence: Zoo Atlanta, United States (September 27, 2026–present)
- Ping Ping
- Sex: Male
- Born: March 17, 2020
- Parents: Mao Mao and Xiong Bang
- Fu Shuang
- Sex: Female
- Born: October 18, 2020
- Parents: Fu Lu and Gong Zai

Ping Ping (Note: Chinese: 平平; lit. 'Peace') (born March 17, 2020) and Fu Shuang (Note: Chinese: 福双; lit. 'Double Blessings') (born October 18, 2020) are two giant pandas given to the United States by Chinese leader Xi Jinping following his 2026 state visit. On Zoo Atlanta announced on April 23, 2026 that they will receive giant pandas, but did not provide further details. On September 24, 2026, Xi said that two giant pandas will be coming to the United States, and the pair arrived at Zoo Atlanta on September 27, 2026, marking the end of a nearly two-year gap where giant pandas were absent from the zoo.

Following a roughly month-long quarantine, Ping Ping and Fu Shuang made their public debut on November 6, 2026. They live in the Arthur M. Blank Panda Grove and are expected to stay at Zoo Atlanta for 10 years.

== Early life and family ==
Ping Ping was born on March 17, 2020, in the Sunlight Nursery of the Chengdu Research Base of Giant Panda Breeding to Mao Mao (mother) and Xiong Bang (father). He shares his name with the first giant panda gifted to the Soviet Union in 1957. Ping Ping and his younger twin An An were the base's first giant panda twins of 2020 and had the earliest birth time recorded in the base's history. The twins' names when paired, form Ping'an (Chinese: 平安; lit. 'Peace and Tranquility'), "representing a blessing for a smooth and healthy life". At one month old, they were given the nicknames Re Gan Mian, (Note: Chinese: 热干面; lit. 'Hot Dry Noodles') after the signature noodle dish of Wuhan, and Dan Hong Gao, (Note: Chinese: 蛋烘糕; lit. 'Egg Cake') a popular pancake street food from Chengdu, as a tribute to medical teams from Chengdu that worked in Wuhan at the beginning of the COVID-19 pandemic.

Fu Shuang was born on October 18, 2020, in the Moonlight Nursery of the Chengdu Research Base of Giant Panda Breeding to Fu Lu (mother) and Gong Zai (father). Through her mother, she has two younger half-sisters, Fu Ru and Fu Wan. Their names take after their mother's name, Fu Lu. (Note: Chinese: 福禄; lit. 'Blessings and Happiness') Fu Shuang's father was the inspiration behind Po, the protagonist of the Kung Fu Panda franchise.

== Zoo Atlanta ==
On April 23, 2026, Zoo Atlanta announced that giant pandas will be sent to the zoo under an agreement with the China Wildlife Conservation Association. Zoo officials refused to elaborate on the announcement, which preceded United States president Donald Trump's state visit to China. On September 24, 2026, during his 3-day state visit to the United States, Chinese leader Xi Jinping announced the imminent arrival of the two giant pandas during his opening remarks to US president Donald Trump at the White House. Xi referred to Ping Ping and Fu Shuang as an "envoy of friendship".

=== Arrival, debut and initial hopes ===
On September 27, 2026, Ping Ping and Fu Shuang boarded the "FedEx Panda Express" Boeing 777-F at Chengdu Shuangliu International Airport and flew to Hartsfield–Jackson Atlanta International Airport. Before the flight, the Chengdu Research Base of Giant Panda Breeding held a send-off ceremony for the two pandas. NBC journalist Janis Mackey Frayer visited Ping Ping and Fu Shuang in May 2026. The two giant pandas were trained for the flight, learning to grow accustomed to hearing loud noises and spending long periods of time in their crates. Upon landing, they were then lifted into FedEx trucks and delivered to Zoo Atlanta. Their arrival, which was regarded as an instance of panda diplomacy by CNN and Mackey Frayer, marked the first time in nearly two years that giant pandas were seen in Atlanta. The previous two, Lun Lun and Yang Yang, lived at the zoo from 1999 to October 12, 2024, taking two of their cubs with them.

After being quarantined for about a month, Ping Ping and Fu Shuang made their public debut on November 6, 2026, the same day their habitat, the Arthur M. Blank Panda Grove, opened. During their debut, the Embassy of China in Washington, D.C. set up an event at the Panda Grove in which American visitors learned how to write Ping Ping and Fu Shuang's Chinese names in the correct stroke order, among other activities. According to Xinhua News Agency, Ping Ping and Fu Shuang will stay at the Zoo Atlanta for 10 years. Their bamboo supply is grown locally, since Atlanta's climate is similar to Chengdu's. As of 7 November 2026, Zoo Atlanta is one of three zoos in the United States that house giant pandas.

In an interview with China Central Television, Chengdu Research Base deputy director Li Mingxi hoped that the two giant pandas will naturally mate. The pair were met with positive reception from the public, and the Ministry of Foreign Affairs believed they will aid China–United States relations and help advocate for animal conservation and biodiversity.

== See also ==
- List of individual giant pandas
