= Mei Lan =

Chinese giant panda (born 2006)

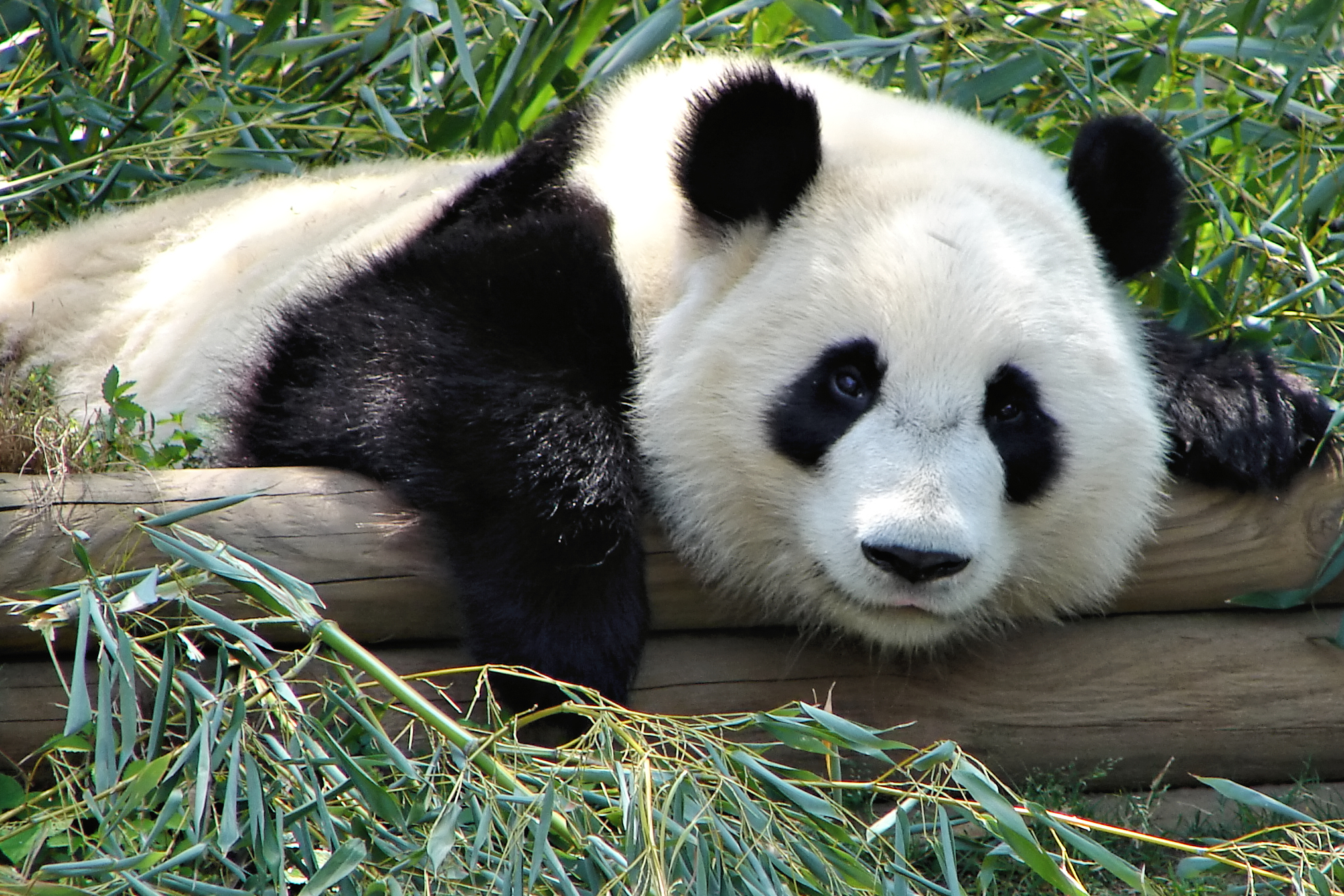
- Two-year-old giant panda Mei Lan at Zoo Atlanta
- Species: Giant panda
- Sex: Male
- Born: September 6, 2006 (age 20); Zoo Atlanta, Georgia, US
- Residence: Chengdu Research Base of Giant Panda Breeding, Sichuan, China

Mei Lan (simplified Chinese: 美兰; traditional Chinese: 美蘭; lit. 'Beautiful orchid'; born September 6, 2006) is a male giant panda born at Zoo Atlanta in Atlanta, Georgia, after his mother's, Lun Lun, record-setting 35-hour labor. Originally identified by zoo staffers as female, Mei Lan was determined to be male by staff in China at the Chengdu Research Base of Panda Breeding. He is the first offspring of Lun Lun and Yang Yang, who are also the parents of Xi Lan, Po, and two pairs of twins, Mei Lun and Mei Huan, and Ya Lun and Xi Lun. Mei Lan was relocated to Chengdu, China on February 4, 2010.

== Naming ==
Mei Lan was named at a naming ceremony held on December 15, 2006, following the Chinese tradition of naming panda cubs when they are about 100 days old.

Mei Lan, which translates as "American orchid" or "beautiful orchid", was submitted by WSB-TV, the Atlanta ABC affiliate. The name was chosen from a public online poll on ajc.com after it won 22 percent of the votes. Many of the names in the poll contain the words "beautiful", "orchid", "peach" or "moon" that are often given to girls in China, because Mei Lan was originally identified as female.

Finalist names in the panda cub naming poll
Name	Chinese	Meaning	Submitter
Chang Jiang	长江; 長江	Yangtze River	Other
Cheng Ya	成娅; 成婭	pretty Atlanta girl from Chengdu	Zoo staff member
Mei Lan	美兰; 美蘭	beautiful peach	WSB-TV (ABC)
Mei Li	美丽; 美麗	beautiful	WAGA-TV (Fox)
Mei Tao	美桃	beautiful peach	WGCL-TV (CBS)
Ming Xing	明星	bright star	WXIA-TV (NBC)
Ming Yue	明月	bright moon	Zoo staff member
Ping Bao	平宝	precious treasure	AJC
Tai Ji	太极	Tai chi	Other
Xiao Tao	小桃	little peach	Panda Express

== Repatriation ==
Mei Lan, similar to other zoo-born giant pandas in the United States, contractually belongs to China. He left for China on February 4, 2010, on the same flight as Tai Shan from the National Zoo in Washington D.C. He currently resides at the Chengdu Panda Base, where both his parents were born.

== See also ==
- List of individual giant pandas
- List of individual bears
