= Zoo Atlanta =

Zoo in Atlanta, Georgia, U.S.

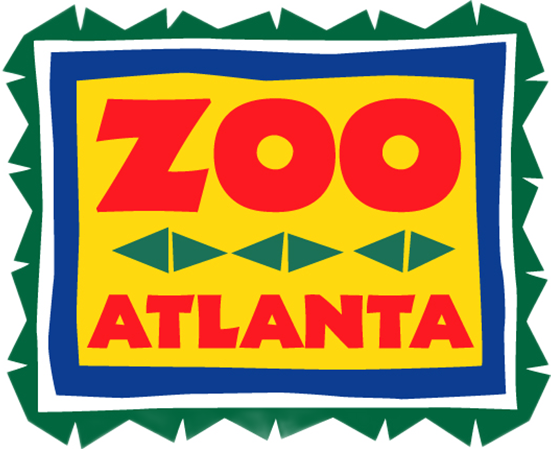
- Interactive map of Zoo Atlanta
- 33°43′57″N 84°22′11″W
- Date opened: 1889; 137 years ago
- Location: Atlanta, Georgia, U.S.
- Land area: 40 acres (16 ha)
- No. of animals: 1,000+
- No. of species: 220+
- Annual visitors: 1 million
- Memberships: AZA
- Website: zooatlanta.org

Zoo Atlanta (sometimes referred to as the Atlanta Zoo) is an Association of Zoos and Aquariums (AZA) accredited zoo in Atlanta, Georgia, United States. The current president and CEO of Zoo Atlanta is Raymond B. King.

As of 2026, the zoo is host to two giant pandas, Ping Ping and Fu Shuang.

== History ==
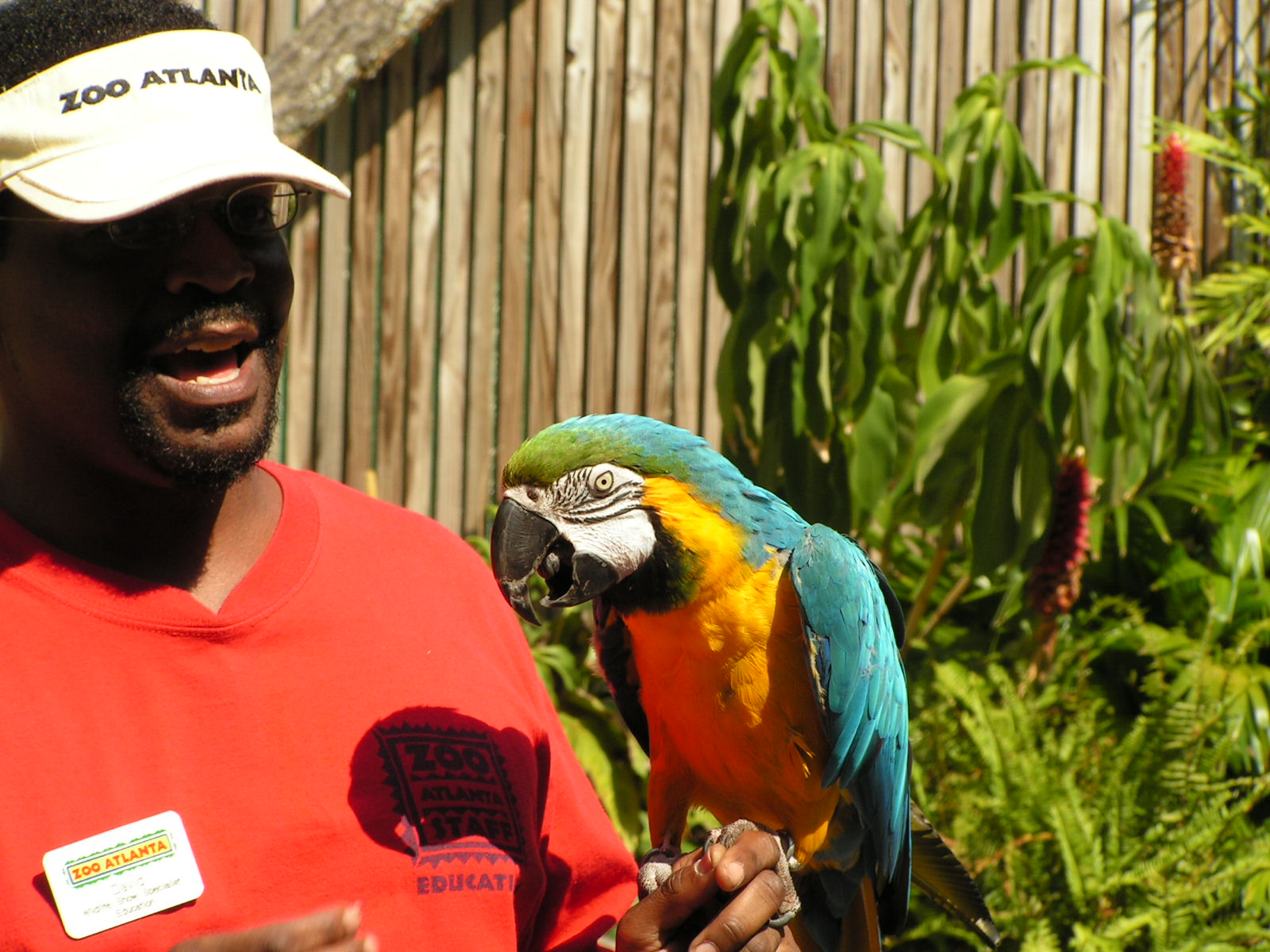
Blue-and-yellow macaw (Ara ararauna) with Education team member

The Grant Park Zoo was founded in 1889, when businessman George V. Gress purchased a bankrupt traveling circus and donated the animals to the city of Atlanta. City leaders opted to house the collection in Grant Park, which remains the zoo's present location. Original residents of the zoo included a black bear, a raccoon, a jaguar, a hyena, a gazelle, a Mexican hog, lionesses, monkeys, and camels. The zoo's collection expanded in the 1930s with the personal donation of a private menagerie owned by Asa G. Candler, Jr.

The 1950s and 1960s were decades of renovation and construction at the zoo, but by the early 1970s, many of its exhibits and facilities were outdated and showing signs of disrepair. In 1970, a small group of concerned citizens founded the Atlanta Zoological Society in hopes of raising funds and awareness for the institution.

Following a period of decline in the mid-1980s, the Atlanta Zoo was privatized in 1985 with the creation of a nonprofit organization, Atlanta Fulton County Zoo Inc., and was renamed Zoo Atlanta that same year. A 20-year period of aggressive restoration followed, marked by several high-profile exhibit openings, including The Ford African Rain Forest, in the late 1980s and early 1990s. A pair of giant pandas, Lun Lun and Yang Yang, arrived at Zoo Atlanta in 1999 and made their debut at Zoo Atlanta in 1999.

== Habitats ==
=== African Savanna ===
Zoo Atlanta's African Savanna, opened in 2019 as part of the Zoo's Grand New View transformation, houses wildlife native to the grasslands and desert of Africa, including African elephants, lions, giraffes, plains zebras, ostriches, warthogs, meerkats, white rhinos, kori bustards, and a bontebok.

=== Scaly Slimy Spectacular: The Amphibian and Reptile Experience ===
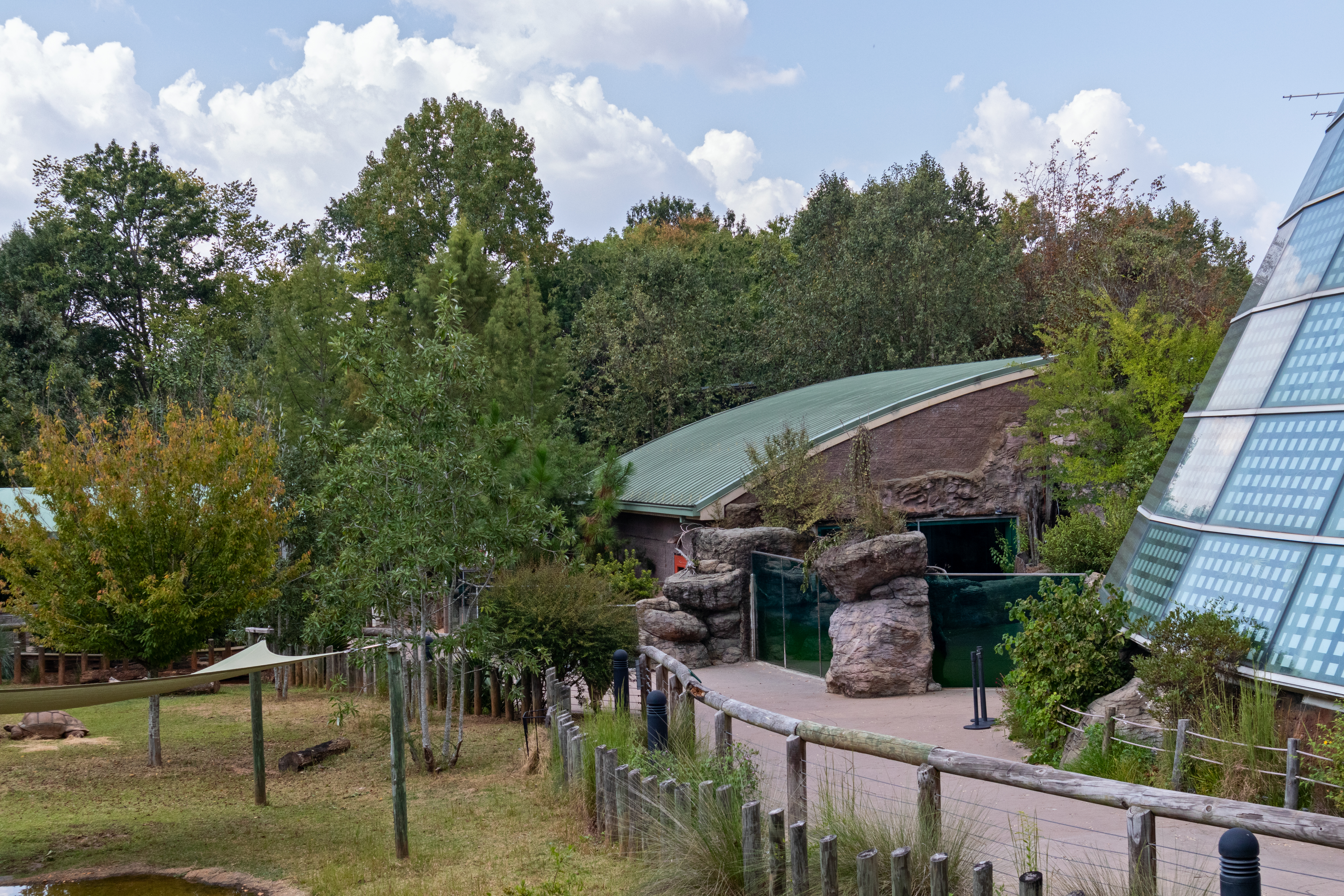
Scaly Slimy Spectacular building

Opened in 2015, Scaly Slimy Spectacular: The Amphibian and Reptile Experience was the world's first LEED Gold-certified amphibian and reptile complex. The complex, which replaced the Zoo's former World of Reptiles, is home to more than 200 animals representing more than 70 species.

Notable reproductive successes include Arakan forest turtles, a critically endangered species harvested nearly to extinction for food and traditional medicine. A rare Guatemalan beaded lizard hatched at Zoo Atlanta in March 2012. A critically endangered bog turtle hatched at Zoo Atlanta in 2022 for the first time in 30 years.

==== List of animals ====
Amphibians

- Black-legged poison frog
- Dyeing poison dart frog
- Evergreen toad
- Green and black poison dart frog
- Lemur leaf frog
- Panamanian golden frog
- Red-eyed tree frog
- Strawberry poison-dart frog
- Titicaca water frog
- White-spotted glass frog

Reptiles

- Alligator snapping turtle
- Amazon tree boa
- Banded rock rattlesnake
- Black beaded lizard
- Blood python
- Boa constrictor
- Boelen's python
- Burmese star tortoise
- Centralian rough knob-tailed gecko
- Corn snake
- Diamondback terrapin
- Eastern diamondback rattlesnake
- Eastern indigo snake
- Eastern Pilbara spiny-tailed skink
- Emerald tree monitor
- Eyelash viper
- Fiji banded iguana
- Gaboon viper
- Green anaconda
- Green tree python
- Guatemalan beaded lizard
- Jamaican boa
- Jamaican iguana
- Louisiana pinesnake
- McCord's box turtle
- Mexican box turtle
- Mexican cantil
- Neotropical bird snake
- Northern caiman lizard
- Pancake tortoise
- Papuan python
- Pine snake
- Plumed basilisk
- Prehensile-tailed skink
- Red spitting cobra
- Reticulated python
- Siamese Crocodile
- Spexkled rattlesnake
- Sri Lankan green pitviper
- Timber rattlesnake
- Timor python
- West African slender-snouted crocodile
- Yellow-blotched map turtle

=== Arthur M. Blank Family Foundation Giant Panda Conservation Center ===
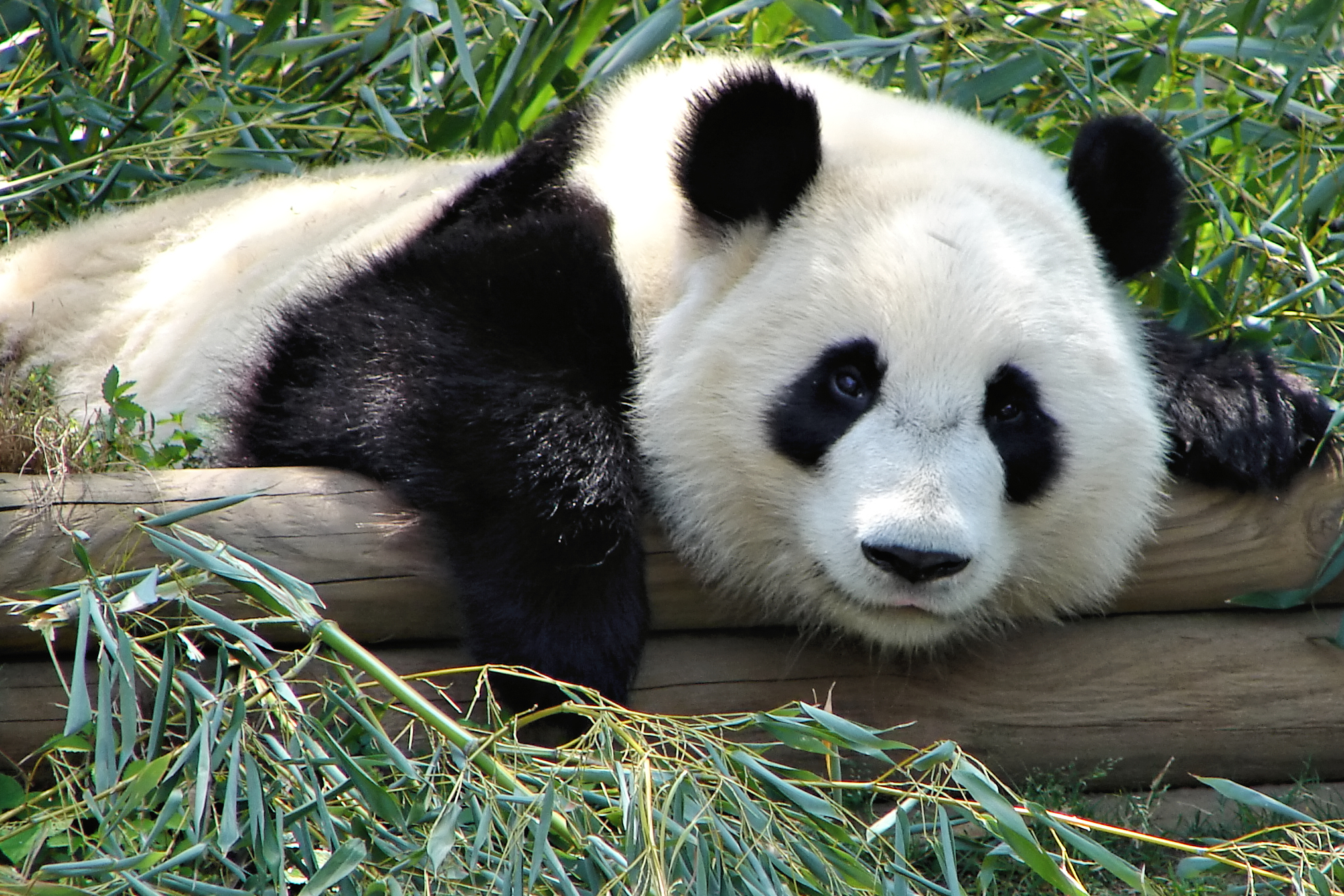
Giant panda Mei Lan, the first cub born to Lun Lun and Yang Yang, in 2008

Zoo Atlanta is one of three institutions in the U.S. that currently houses giant pandas. The zoo is host to two pandas, Ping Ping and Fu Shuang, who arrived in September 2026 after a two-year gap with no pandas. From 1999 to 2024, Zoo Atlanta hosted Lun Lun and Yang Yang, who produced seven cubs during their stay.

Giant pandas at Zoo Atlanta stay in the Arthur M. Blank Family Foundation Giant Panda Conservation Center.

==== Lun Lun and Yang Yang, 1999–2024 ====
Lun Lun (female) and Yang Yang (male) arrived in Atlanta as juveniles in 1999 and resided at the zoo on loan from China until 2024. The pair's first cub, male Mei Lan, was born on September 6, 2006. A second cub, male Xi Lan, was born August 30, 2008. Female Po (寶蘭) was born November 3, 2010. Po's name was announced by actor Jack Black in 2011; Po was named after Black's character in the DreamWorks animated film franchise Kung Fu Panda.

A fourth and a fifth cub, both female, born July 15, 2013, were the first twin pandas to be born in the U.S. since 1987. Their names were announced on ABC's Good Morning America on October 23, 2013, 100 days after their birth (a Chinese tradition) as Mei Lun (美轮) and Mei Huan (美奂).

A sixth and seventh cub, both female, were born September 3, 2016. Their names were also announced on their 100th day of life: Ya Lun (雅伦) and Xi Lun (喜伦).

Ya Lun and Xi Lun traveled back to China on October 14, 2024. Lun Lun, Yang Yang, and cubs Mei Lan, Xi Lan, Po, Mei Lun, Mei Huan, Ya Lun and Xi Lun all now reside at the Chengdu Research Base of Giant Panda Breeding in China.

==== Ping Ping and Fu Shuang, 2026 ====
On April 23, 2026, Zoo Atlanta announced that they reached a new agreement with the China Wildlife Conservation Association. Chinese leader Xi Jinping confirmed this on September 24, 2026 during a state visit to the United States, and said "The giant panda has been an envoy of friendship between the Chinese and Americans". Two pandas — male Ping Ping (平平; born March 17, 2020) and female Fu Shuang (福双; born October 18, 2020) — arrived in Atlanta on September 27, 2026. They are expected to return to China in 2036.

=== The Ford African Rain Forest ===
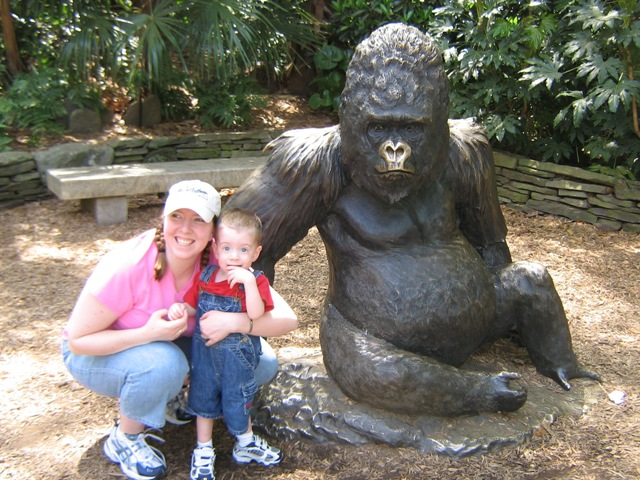
Families often pose with one of the Willie B. bronze statues at Zoo Atlanta.

Twenty-four western lowland gorillas have been born at the zoo since the opening of The Ford African Rain Forest in 1988. Kali and Kazi, a rare set of twins, were born at Zoo Atlanta on October 31, 2005.

Zoo Atlanta also remains home to offspring of its best-known gorilla, Willie B. (ca. 1959–2000). The zoo is also home to six of Willie B.'s grandchildren: Merry Leigh (2011) and Mijadala (2016), born to Kudzoo; Anaka (2013), born to Sukari; Andi (2013) and Floyd (2019), born to Lulu. Others reside at other accredited zoos.

Other famous gorillas who have lived at Zoo Atlanta include Ivan, who resided at the Zoo from 1994 to his passing in 2012, and Ozzie, who lived at the Zoo from 1988 until his passing in 2022.

The Living Treehouse is an extension of The Ford African Rain Forest completed in 2004. The exhibit houses an aviary of African birds, as well as black-and-white ruffed lemurs and ring-tailed lemurs, with adjacent habitats for Angolan colobus monkeys, drills, Schmidt's guenons, and Wolf's guenons. In 2017, Zoo Atlanta introduced two crowned lemurs.

=== Corridor to Change and Complex Carnivores ===
Corridor to Change is focused on species impacted by the international wildlife trade. The complex is home to sun bears and Sumatran tigers. An adjacent area, Complex Carnivores, houses clouded leopards and binturongs.

=== Asian Forest ===
The Asian Forest houses giant otters, a Komodo dragon and a red panda, as well as Bornean and Sumatran orangutans.

The Orangutan Learning Tree Project, launched at Zoo Atlanta in 2007, utilizes in-habitat touch screen technology to allow orangutans to engage in computer puzzles, games and problem-solving exercises while guests observe their activities on a linked monitor.

=== Orkin Children's Zoo ===
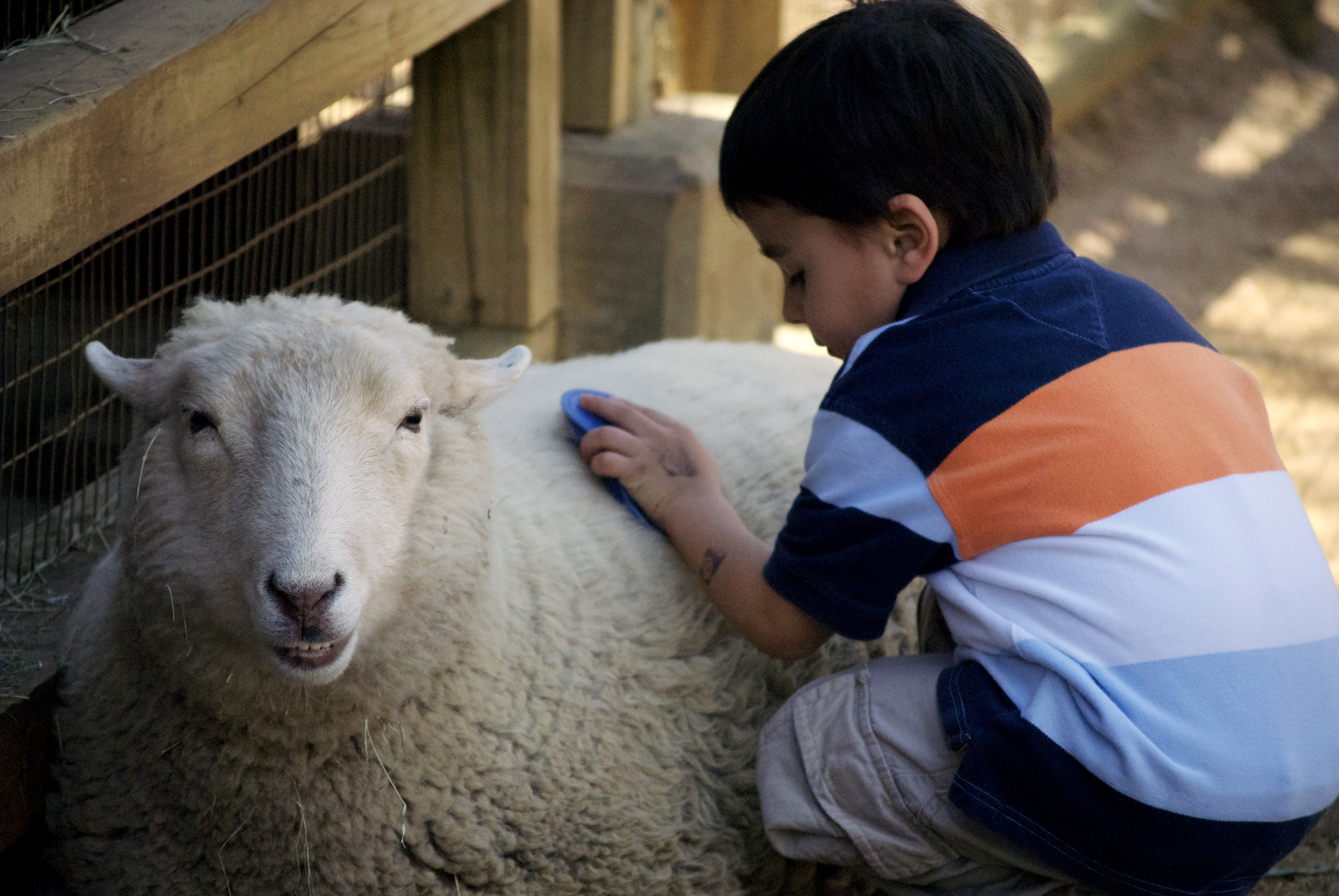
A child pets a Gulf Coast Native sheep

Zoo Atlanta's Outback Station petting zoo is home to Saanen goats, Oberhasli goats, Nubian goats, Southdown babydoll sheep, Gulf Coast sheep, Nigerian dwarf goats, and two kunekune pigs.

=== Aviaries ===
Aviaries throughout Zoo Atlanta are home to more than 50 species. These include but are not limited to Bali mynas, white-headed buffalo weavers, superb starlings, golden pheasants, king vultures, hooded vultures, Indian peafowls, blue-throated macaws, milky eagle owls, southern ground hornbills, tawny frogmouths, blue-throated laughingthrushes, blue cranes, wattled cranes, and white storks.

Zoo Atlanta's flock of Chilean flamingos, visible just inside the zoo entrance in Flamingo Plaza, has consistently bred and nested since 2001.

== Conservation and research ==
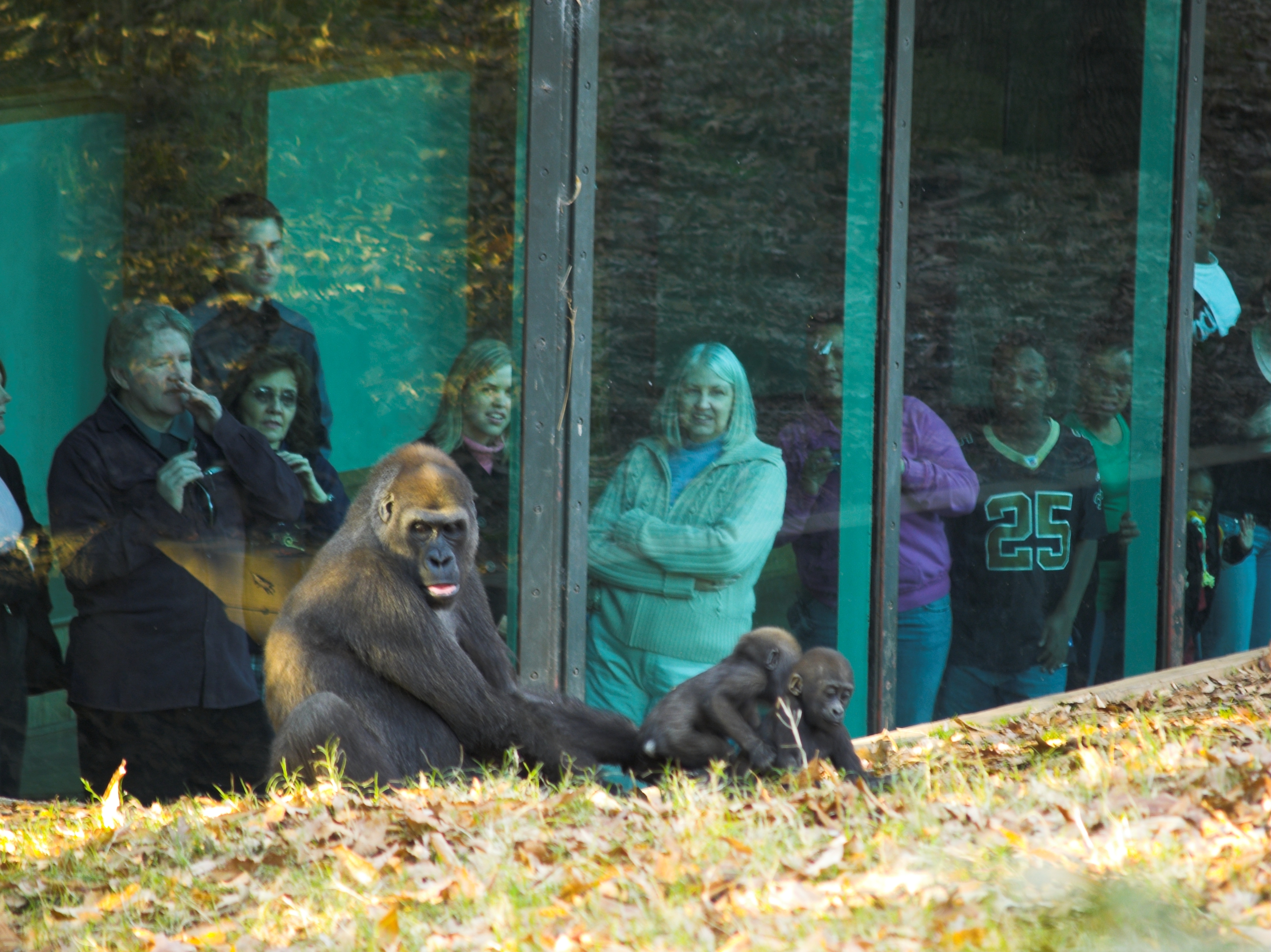
Guests viewing the gorilla habitat from The Ford Willie B. Conservation Center.

Zoo Atlanta's mission statement is, "We save wildlife and their habitats through conservation, research, education, and engaging experiences. Our efforts connect people to animals and inspire conservation action."

Species impacted by conservation support from Zoo Atlanta include giant pandas, African elephants, golden lion tamarins, western lowland gorillas, Panamanian golden frogs, red pandas, clouded leopards, giant otters, Bornean orangutans, African vulture species such as hooded vultures and lappet-faced vultures, and native reptile species such as eastern indigo snakes and diamondback terrapins.

In 2018, Zoo Atlanta was named a Top 10 Research Zoo for its contributions to peer-reviewed scientific research.

=== AZA Species Survival Plans ===
Zoo Atlanta is a participant in the AZA Species Survival Plan for the following programs:

- Aruba Island rattlesnake
- Bali mynah
- Black rhino
- Bongo
- Burmese star tortoise
- Clouded leopard
- African elephant
- Giant panda
- Gorilla
- Golden lion tamarin
- Guenon
- Komodo dragon
- Kori bustard
- Lemur
- Lion
- Orangutan
- Otter
- Radiated tortoise
- Red panda
- Sumatran tiger

Zoo Atlanta also participates in several international conservation initiatives for reptiles and amphibians, working to combat issues such as the Asian turtle crisis and the global decline of amphibians. Staff members from Zoo Atlanta and the Atlanta Botanical Garden have established captive assurance colonies of Panamanian frogs threatened by the spread of chytrid fungus, the cause of the infectious amphibian disease chytridiomycosis.

== Savanna Hall ==
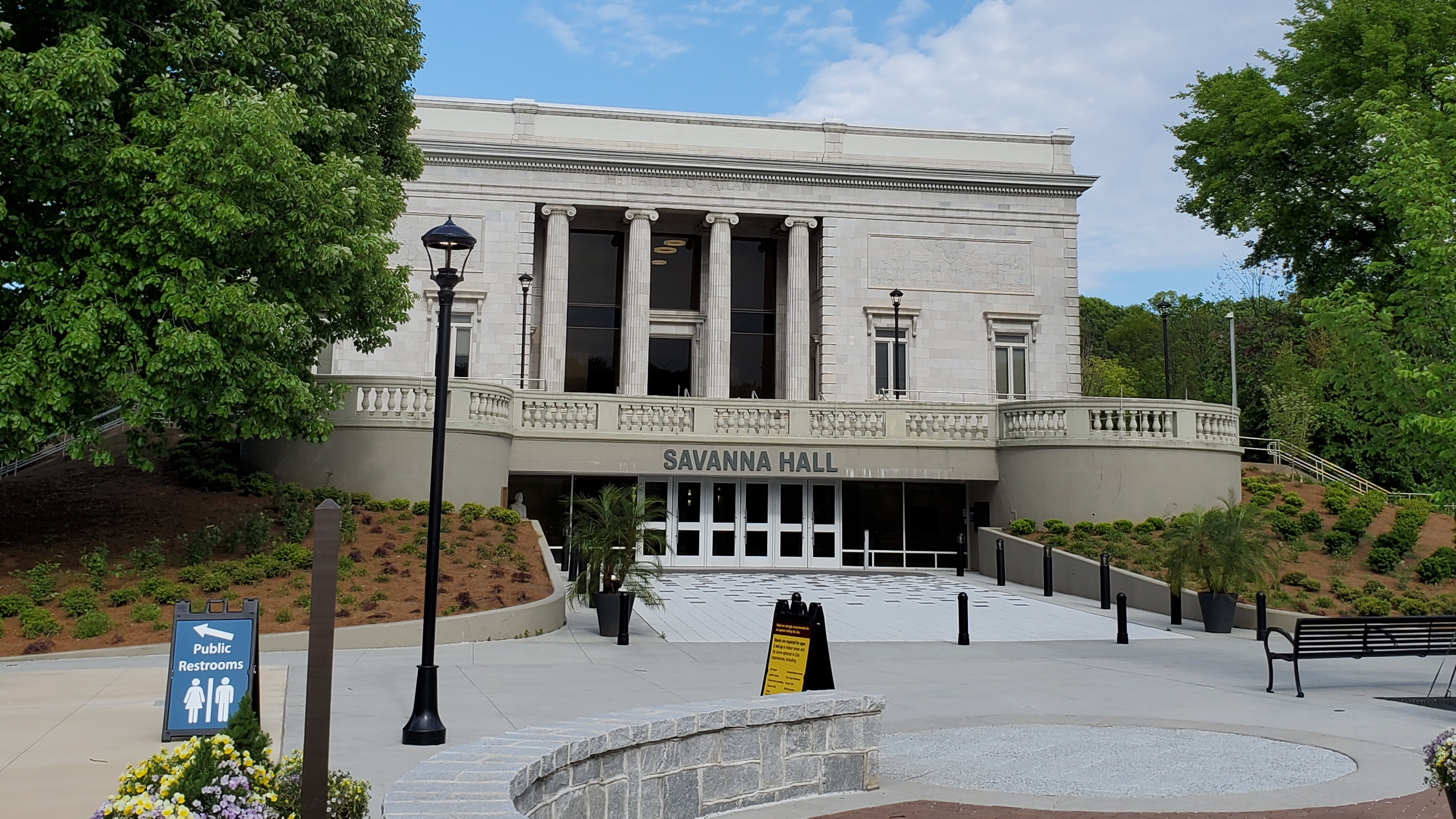
Savanna Hall

Built in 1921, the historic Savanna Hall was for decades the former home of the Atlanta Cyclorama painting "The Battle of Atlanta." The painting now resides at the Atlanta History Center.

Zoo Atlanta was granted stewardship of the structure by Atlanta mayor Kasim Reed in 2014. Upon restoring the building, Zoo Atlanta engaged in many efforts to retain nods to the structure's history, including but not limited to preserving its original granite facade, original terra cotta walls, and original rail system used to hang the massive painting. These are visible in what is now the Michael and Thalia Carlos Ballroom.

Savanna Hall opened as a special events destination in 2019.

== Leadership ==
In 1985, Dr. Terry Maple assumed management responsibility for zoo operations of the Atlanta-Fulton County Zoo, Inc, which was privatized and rebranded as Zoo Atlanta. Maple retired from Zoo Atlanta in 2003 and served as Zoo Director Emeritus until his death in 2023.

Dennis W. Kelly served as president and CEO from 2003 to 2009. Atlanta native Raymond B. King has served as president and CEO since 2010. Zoo Atlanta has a board of directors who are elected for three-year terms.

Duane Rumbaugh, a professor at Georgia State University in Atlanta, was a longtime advisor and researcher on animal behavior and welfare.

== Gallery ==
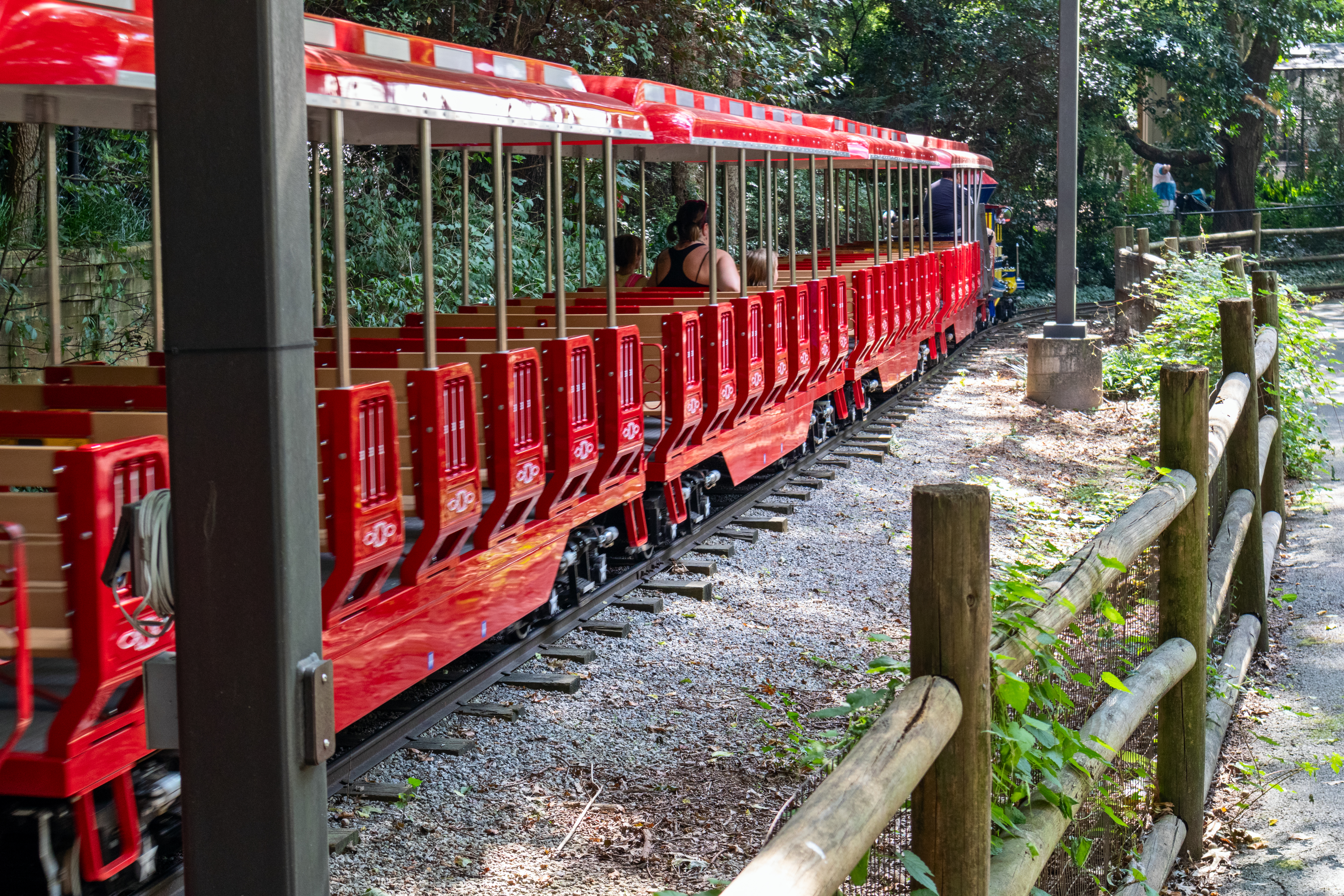
Zoo Atlanta train

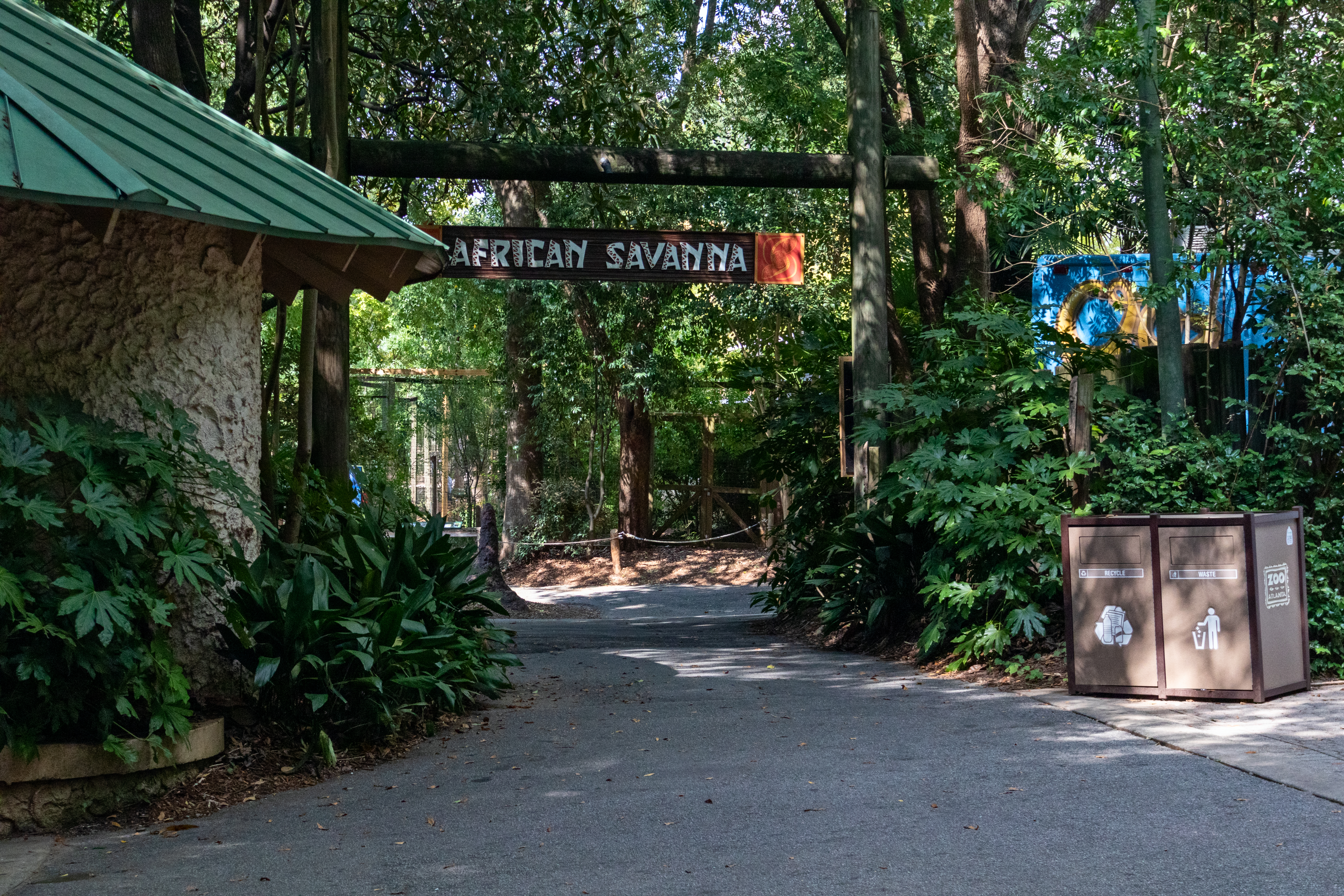
Entrance to the African Savanna

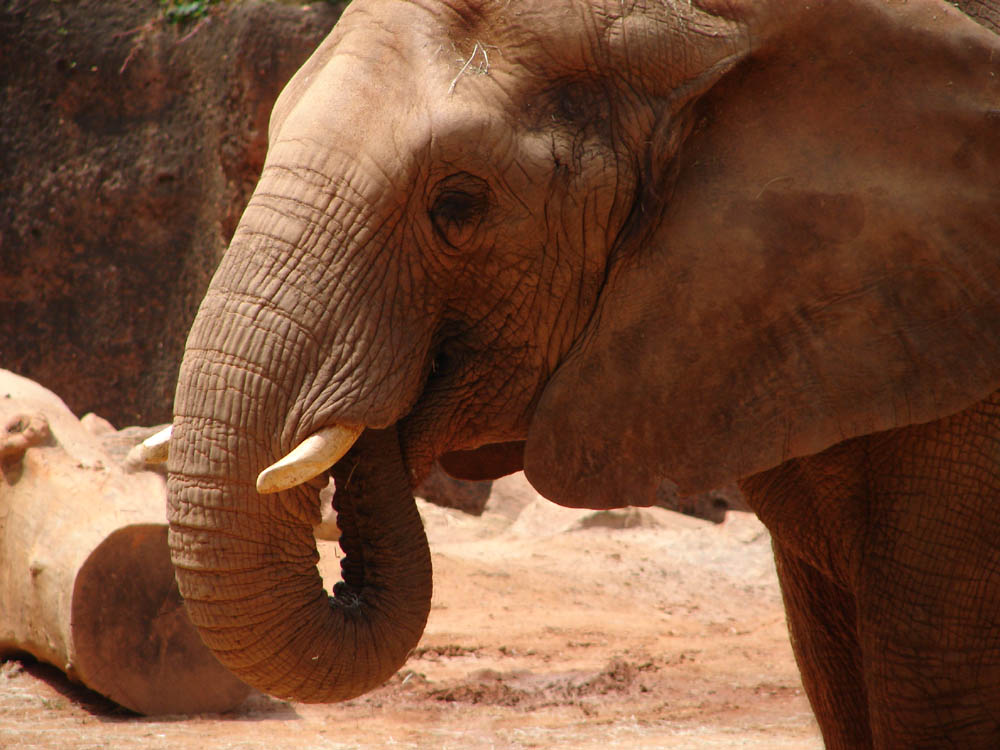
African elephant

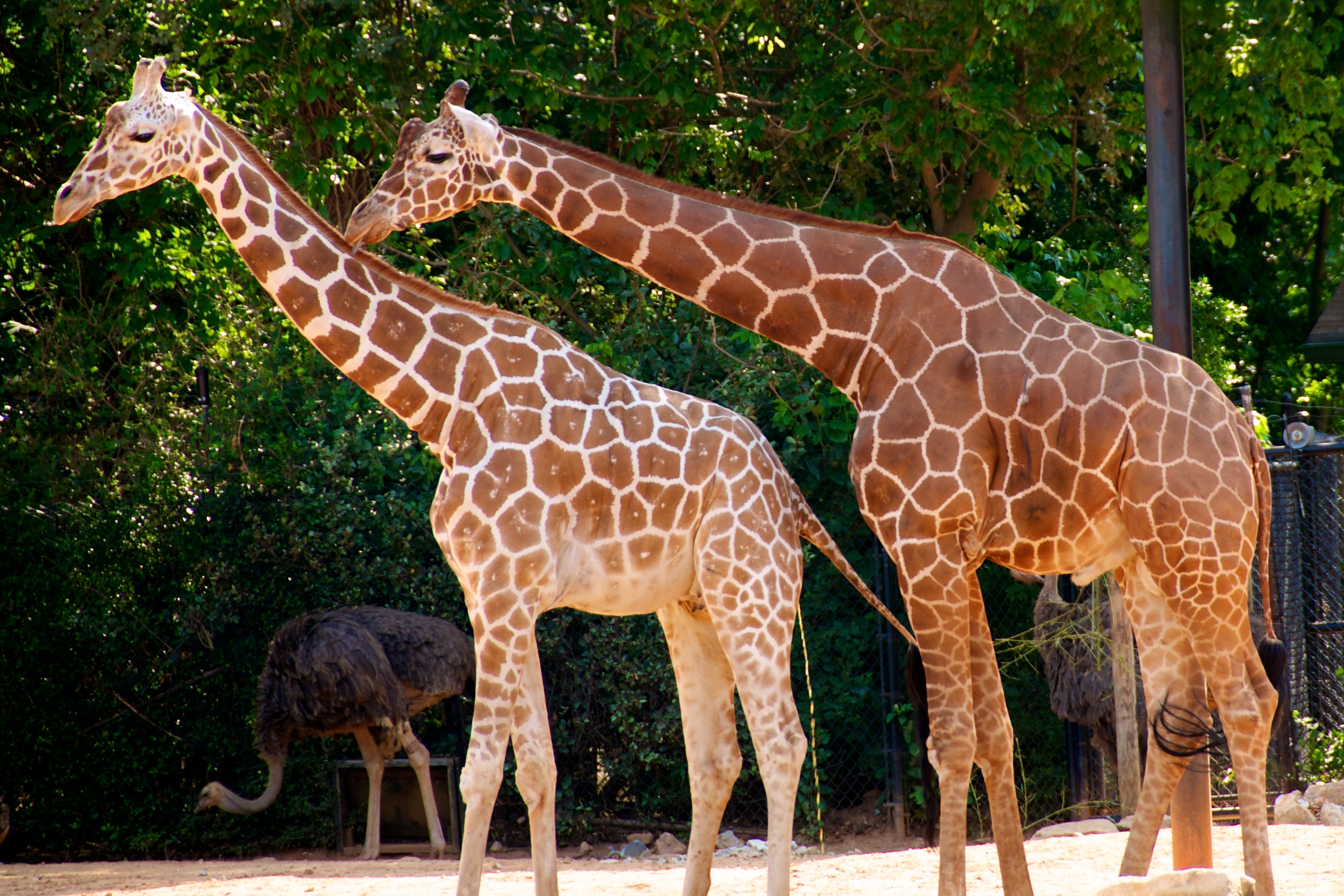
Giraffes

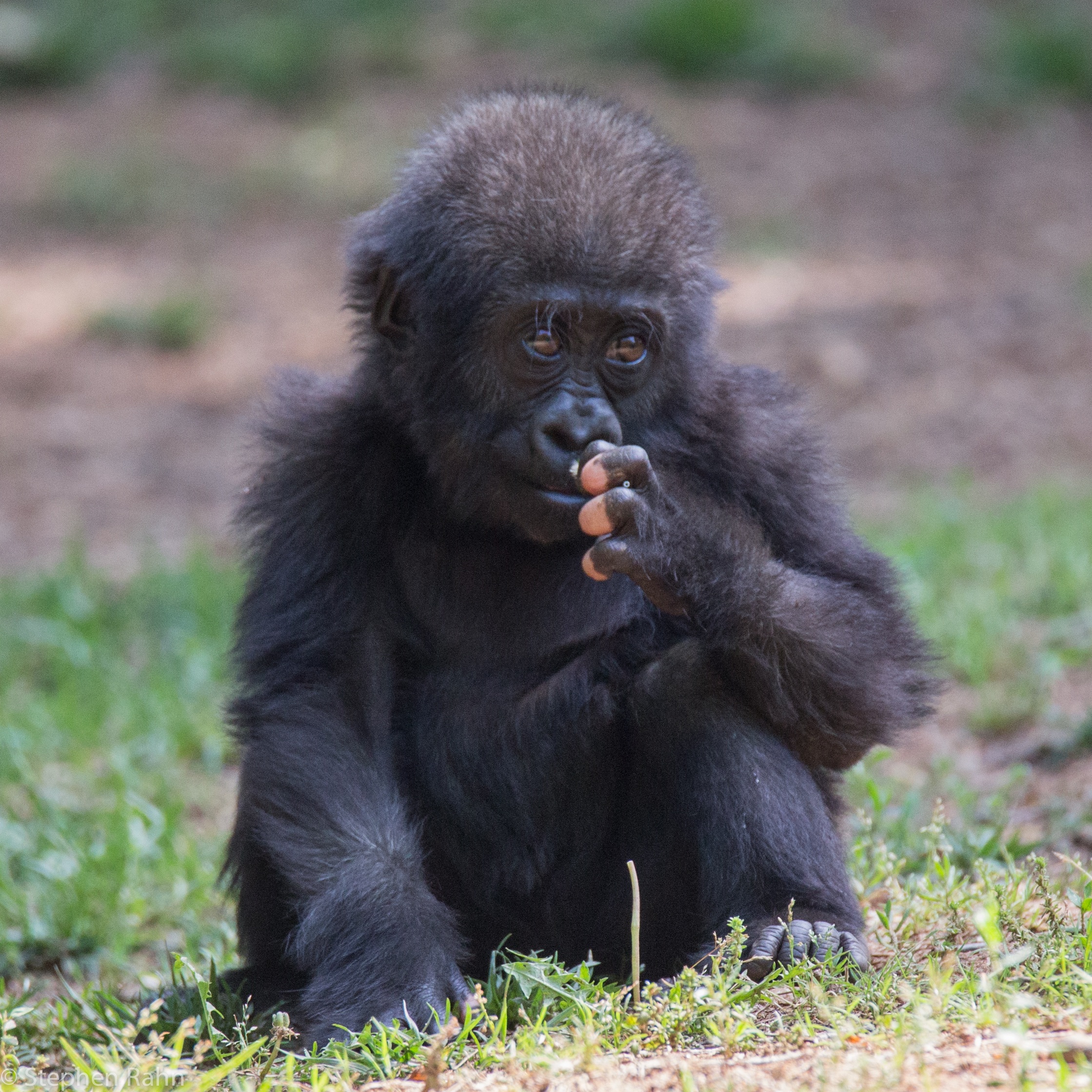
Baby gorilla

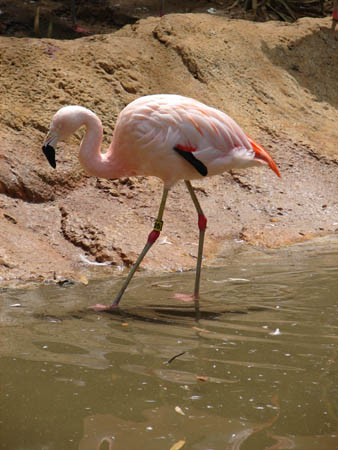
Chilean flamingo

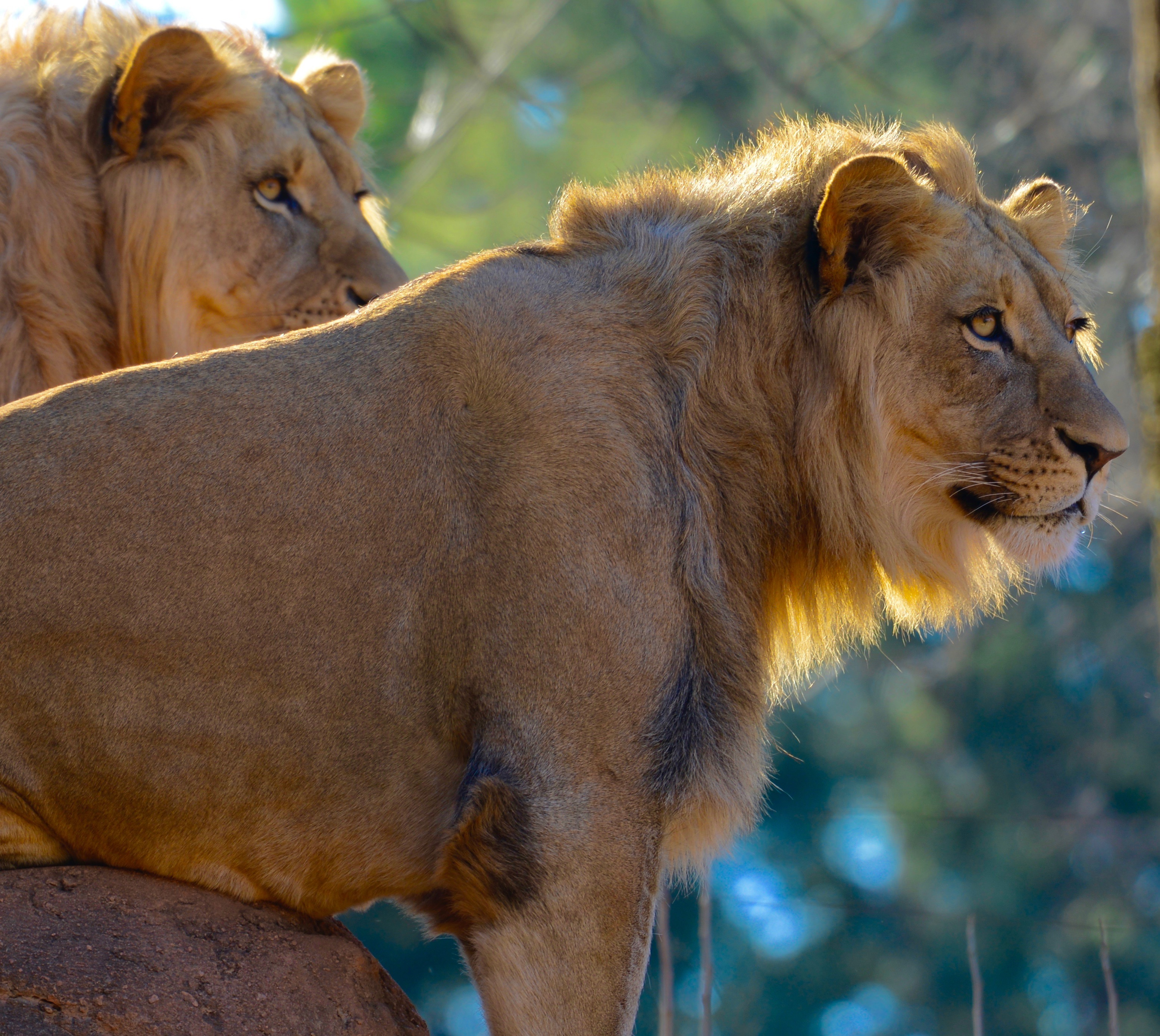
Lion

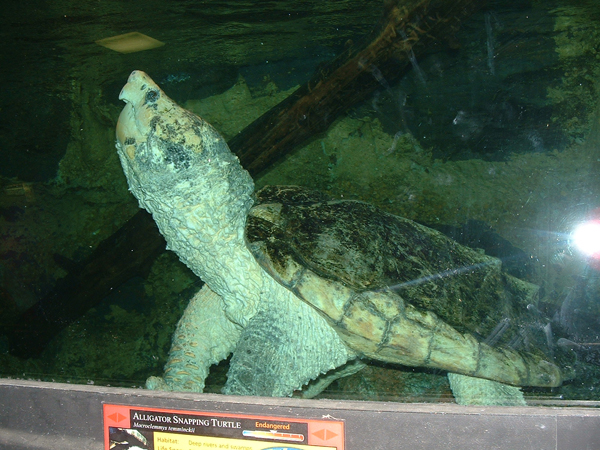
Alligator snapping turtle

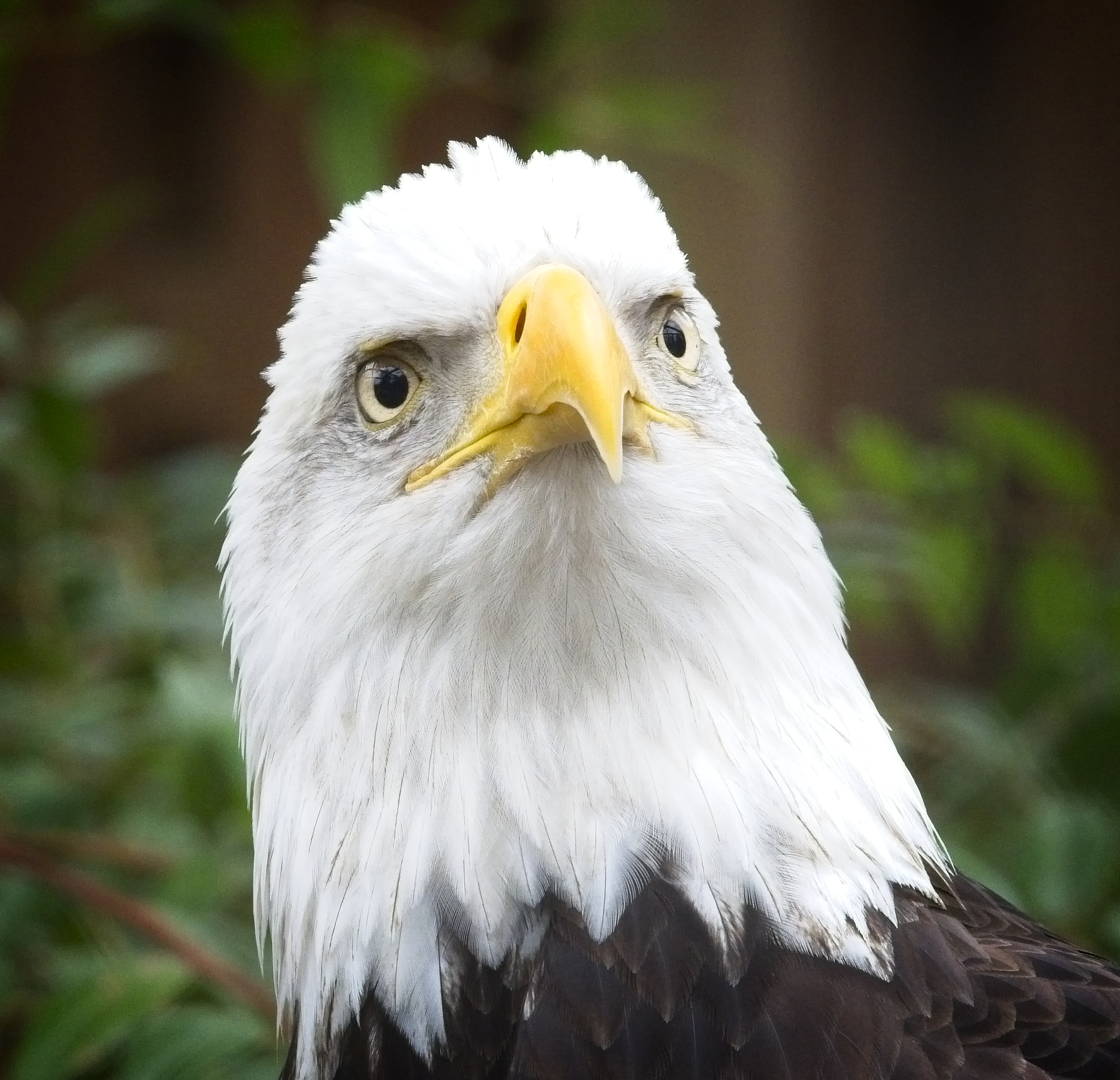
Bald eagle

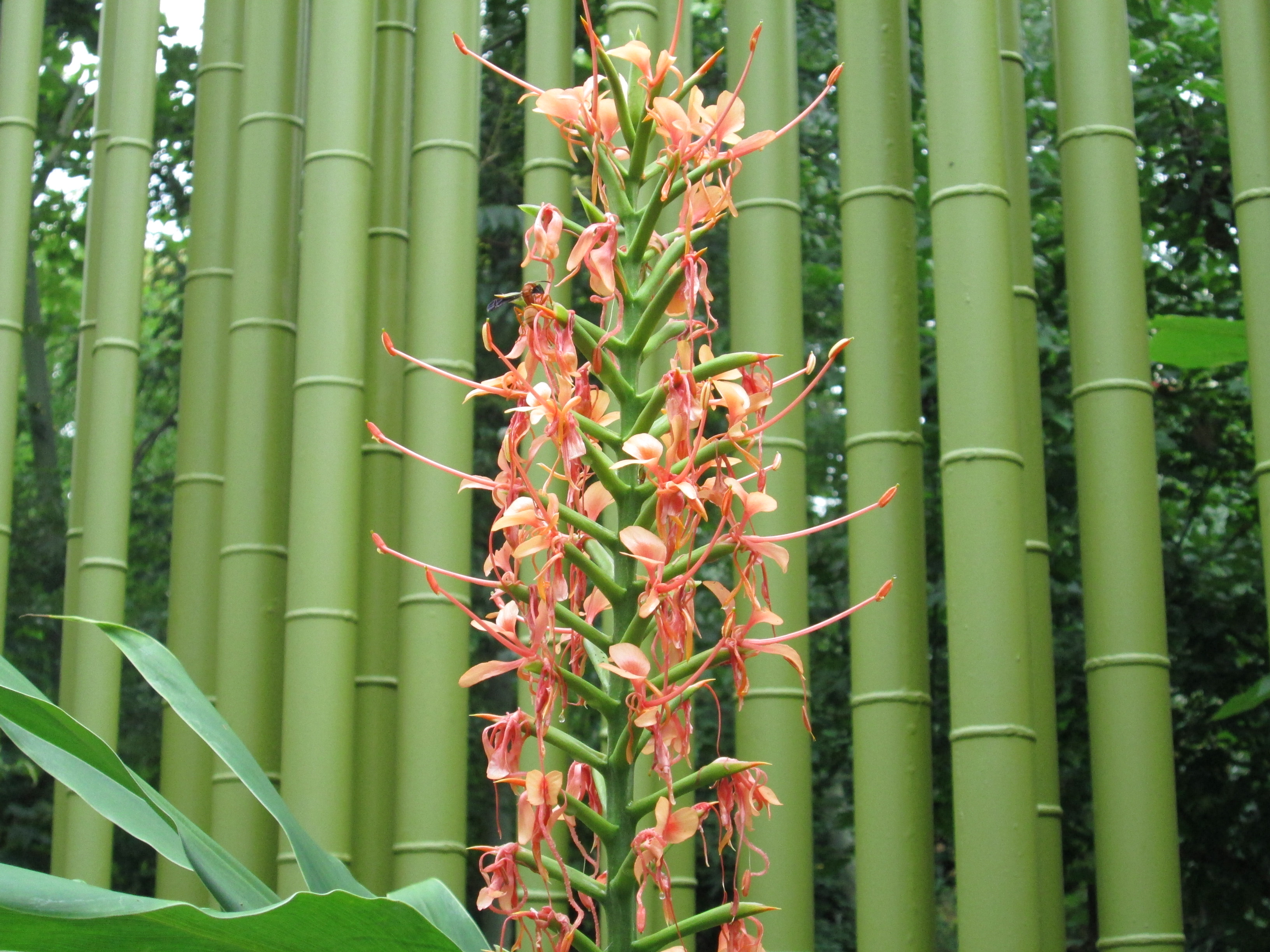
Flowers and bamboo at the zoo
