= Raymond B. King =

American executive (born 1965)

Raymond B. King (born 1965) is an American executive. Since 2010, he has been the president and CEO of Zoo Atlanta in Atlanta, Georgia.

== Early life ==
King was born in Atlanta on November 16, 1965. He attended Erskine College in Due West, South Carolina, later transferring to the Georgia Institute of Technology, where he was active in the Chi Phi fraternity. He graduated with a Bachelor of Science degree in management in 1987.

== Career ==
King began his professional career at SunTrust Bank in 1988. His leadership positions included senior vice president of community affairs and corporate secretary of SunTrust Atlanta.

King was listed among Georgia Trend magazine's "Top 40 Under 40" in 2004 and was named on the Watch List of the Atlanta Business Chronicle's "25 Atlantans Making a Difference" in 2007. King was a recipient of the United Way Chairman's Award in 2009 and was named among the Atlanta Business Chronicle's "Most Influential Atlantans" in 2012.

King joined Zoo Atlanta on June 1, 2010, as president and CEO.

== Civic activities ==
King has been chair of six non-profit boards of directors, namely the Fernbank Museum of Natural History (2010), Regional Business Coalition, Committee for a Better Atlanta, Metro Atlanta Arts and Culture Coalition, Theatre in the Square, and Research Atlanta.
