= Lun Lun and Yang Yang =

Giant pandas (born 1997)

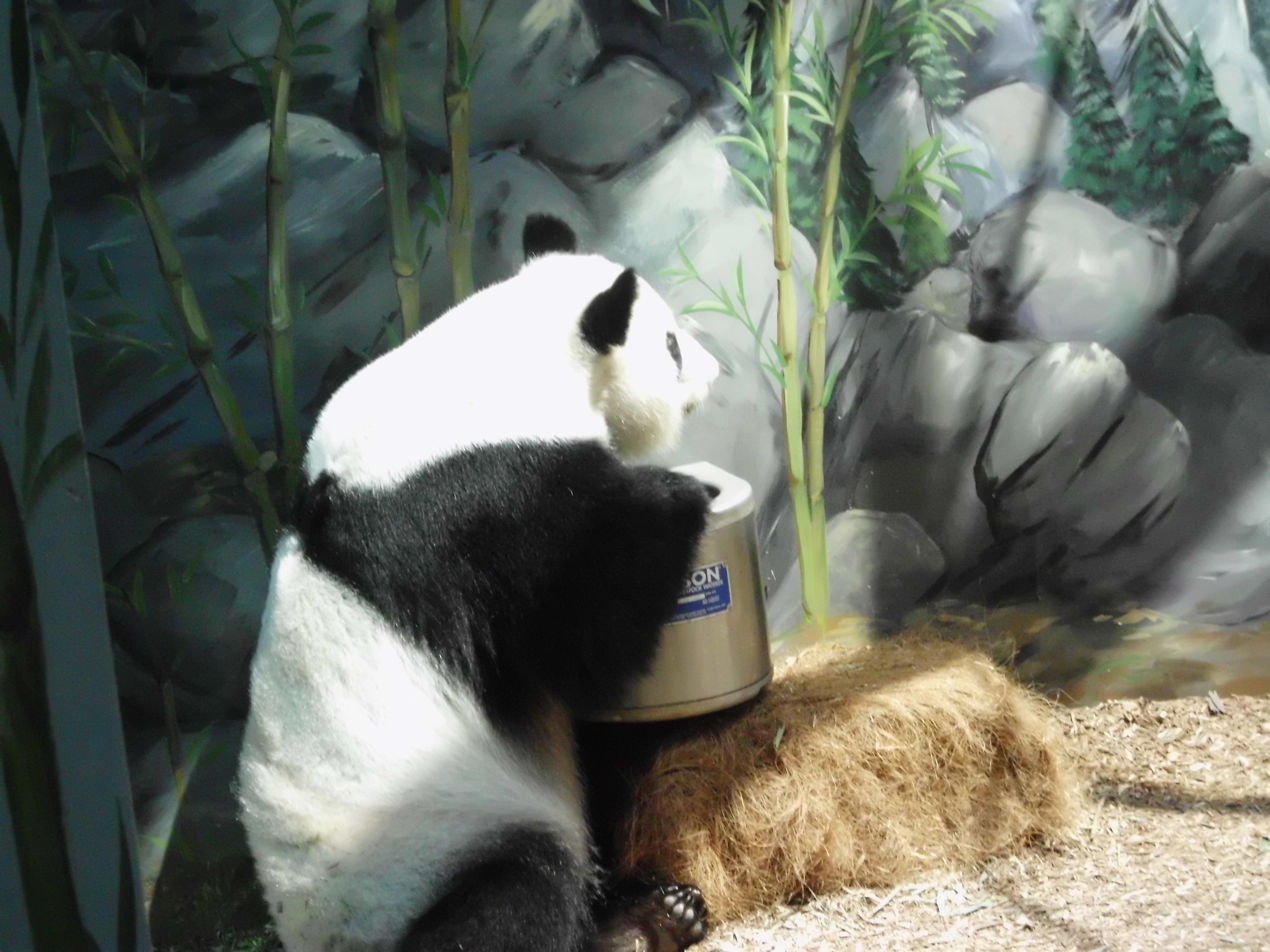
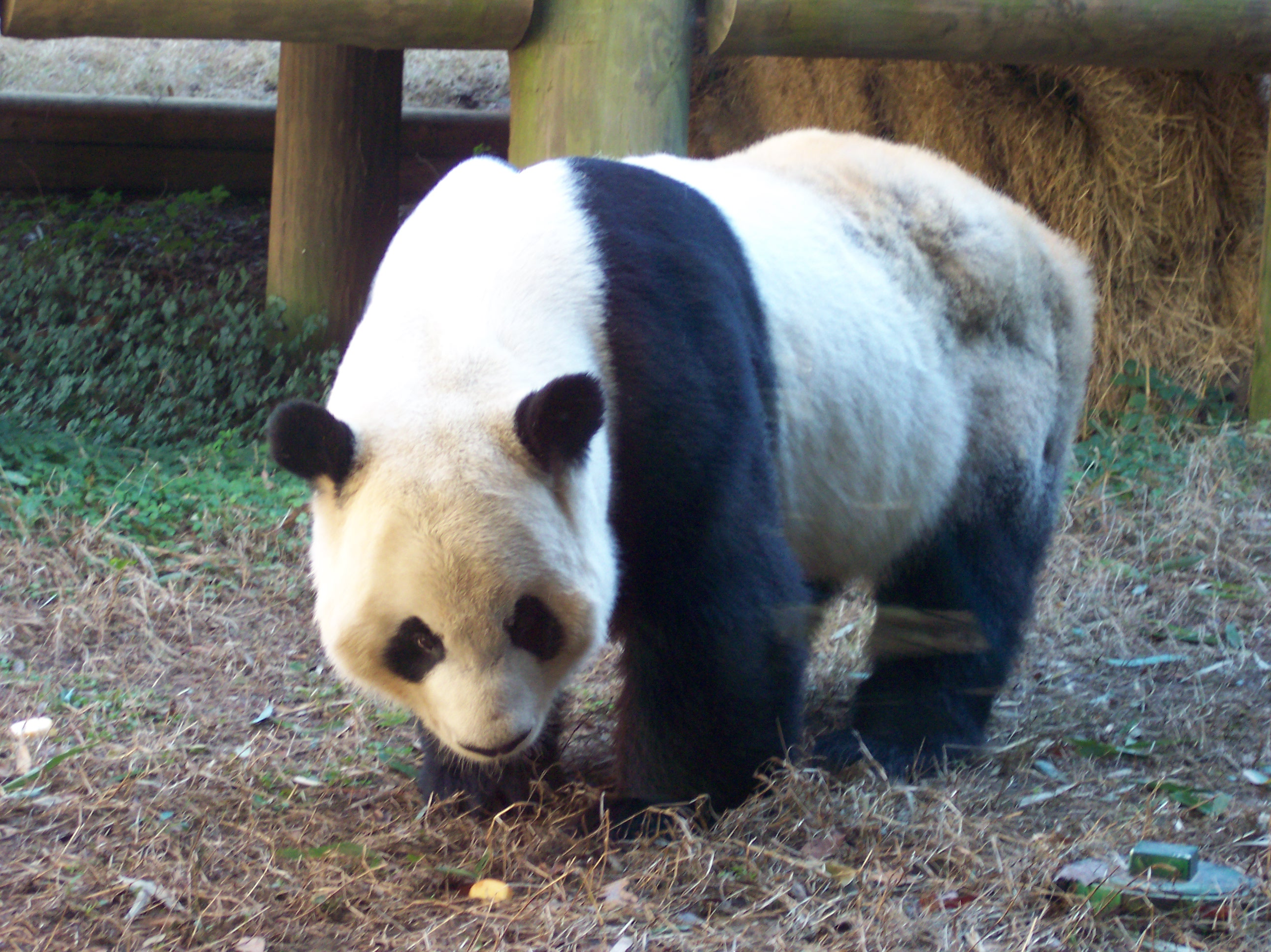
- Lun Lun in 2011 Yang Yang in December 2006
- Species: Giant panda (Ailuropoda melanoleuca)
- Born: Chengdu Research Base of Giant Panda Breeding, China
- Offspring: Mei Lan; Xi Lan; Po; Mei Lun and Mei Huan (twins); Ya Lun and Xi Lun (twins)
- Lun Lun
- Sex: Female
- Born: August 25, 1997 (age 29)
- Yang Yang
- Sex: Male
- Born: September 9, 1997 (age 29)

Lun Lun (Note: Chinese: 伦伦; pinyin: Lún Lún) (born August 25, 1997) and Yang Yang (Note: Chinese: 洋洋; pinyin: Yáng Yáng; lit. 'little sea') (born September 9, 1997) are two giant pandas who lived at Zoo Atlanta in Atlanta, Georgia, starting in November 5, 1999. From 2006 to 2016, Lun Lun gave birth to seven cubs, making Zoo Atlanta one of the most reproductively successful areas for giant pandas. Lun Lun and Yang Yang, along with their two youngest cubs, Ya Lun and Xi Lun, left the zoo on October 12, 2024, to go to Chengdu. In total, Zoo Atlanta spent over $16 million on the giant pandas.

== Early life ==
Lun Lun was born on August 25, 1997, and Yang Yang was born on September 9, 1997, at the Chengdu Research Base of Giant Panda Breeding in China. Lun Lun's original name, Hua Hua, was changed to Lun Lun by her sponsor, the Taiwanese rock star Su Huilun. Yang Yang was originally named Jiu Jiu, until his adoption by three organizations in the Netherlands. On November 5, 1999, the two giant pandas were brought to Zoo Atlanta, a process which took 12 years to finalize. With their arrival, Lun Lun and Yang Yang were the first giant pandas in Zoo Atlanta.

== Offspring ==
During their time at Zoo Atlanta, Lun Lun and Yang Yang became the parents of seven cubs: Mei Lan, Xi Lan, Po, Mei Lun, Mei Huan, Xi Lun and Ya Lun. This makes Zoo Atlanta's giant panda breeding program among the most successful. Despite being born overseas, the cubs are considered Chinese property, so they had to leave the zoo. As of 18 April 2023, Zoo Atlanta spent over $16 million on the seven giant pandas.

=== Mei Lan ===
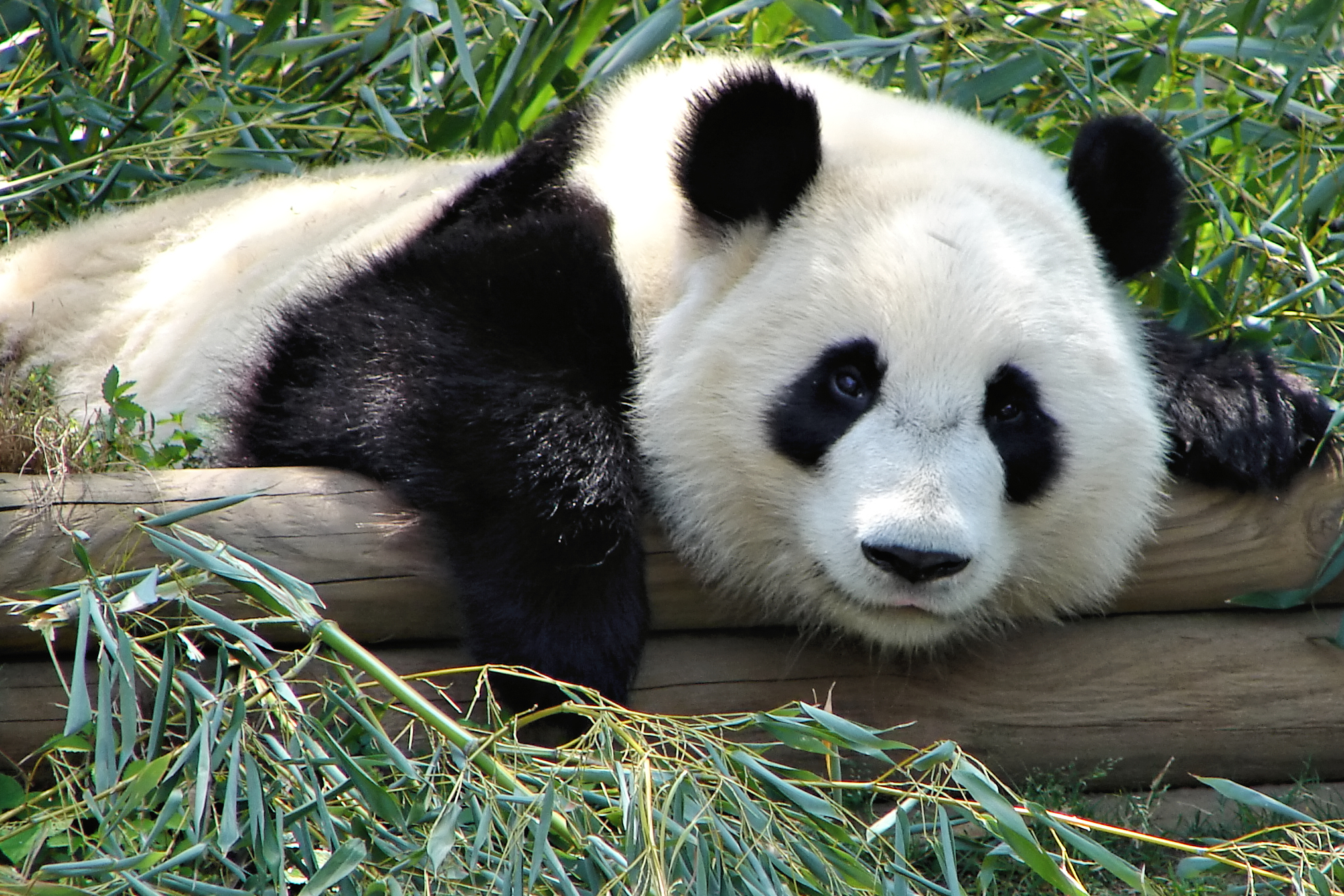
Two-year-old Mei Lan at Zoo Atlanta

On September 6, 2006, Lun Lun gave birth to a cub named Mei Lan, who made his public debut on January 5, 2007. Six months prior to his birth, Zoo Atlanta announced that Lun Lun had been artificially inseminated using Yang Yang's sperm after believing they were unlikely to naturally mate. Lun Lun had spent 36 hours in labor, which was the longest amount of time for a giant panda. Mei Lan left for China on February 4, 2010, on the same flight as Tai Shan from the National Zoo in Washington D.C., to assist in the giant panda breeding program. After Mei Lan's departure, officials at the Chengdu Research Base of Giant Panda Breeding realized that he was actually a male, since the panda's testes did not fully descend until then.

=== Xi Lan and Po ===
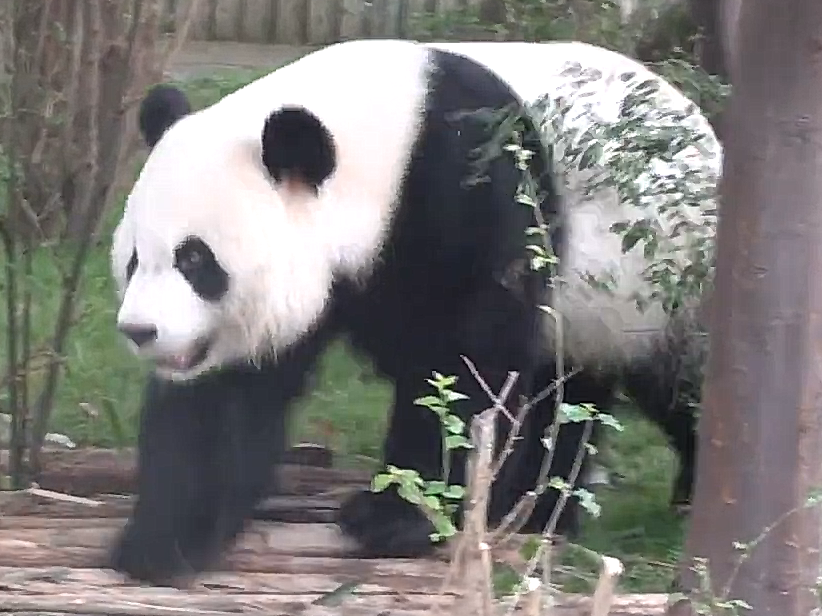
Xi Lan in Chengdu in 2015

On August 30, 2008, (Note: Zoo Atlanta erroneously lists Xi Lan's birth date as April 30, 2008.) Lun Lun gave birth to a second cub, a male named Xi Lan. (Note: simplified Chinese: 喜兰; traditional Chinese: 喜蘭; lit. 'Joyful orchid') He returned to China on May 12, 2014, and, as of October 2024, he is living at the Chengdu Research Base of Giant Panda Breeding with the rest of his family.

On November 3, 2010, Lun Lun gave birth to her third cub, Po, who was believed to be a male.

=== Twins ===
On July 15, 2013, Lun Lun gave birth to her first set of twins, Mei Lun and Mei Huan, both initially identified as male. In December, preliminary exams on Xi Lan and Po as they prepared to return to Chengdu indicated that Po might have been misidentified as male, and the zoo ran DNA tests on several of the bears. On December 13, 2013, Zoo Atlanta reported that Po, Mei Lun, and Mei Huan are all female.

Lun Lun gave birth to her second set of twins, Ya Lun (Note: Chinese: 雅伦) and Xi Lun, (Note: Chinese: 喜伦) on September 3, 2016, the same year the giant panda's placement on the IUCN Red List was changed from an endangered species to a vulnerable species. In Chinese, their names mean "elegant" and "happy", respectively; according to The Straits Times, they mean "Lun Lun's elegant and happy daughters" when combined. From 2017 to 2019, the twins received "birthday surprises", which included their favorite foods. Zoo Atlanta publicized the making of the twins' ice cakes on Facebook. Ya Lun and Xi Lun's move to China was postponed due to the COVID-19 pandemic.

== Departure ==
In May 2024, Zoo Atlanta announced that the giant panda program, which lasted for 25 years, would be coming to an end at the end of the year. The zoo did not provide a specific date, but in September, they advised visitors to see Lun Lun, Yang Yang, Ya Lun and Xi Lun before mid-October. On October 5, 2024, the zoo held the Panda-Palooza, a farewell party that garnered over 9,000 visitors. A week later, the four giant pandas were returned to China via a Boeing 777 known as the FedEx Panda Express. They arrived in Chengdu on October 13. Giant pandas were not seen in Zoo Atlanta for nearly two years, until Ping Ping and Fu Shuang made their public debut on November 6, 2026.

== See also ==
- List of individual giant pandas
- List of individual bears
