= Xi Lan =

Male giant panda (born 2008)

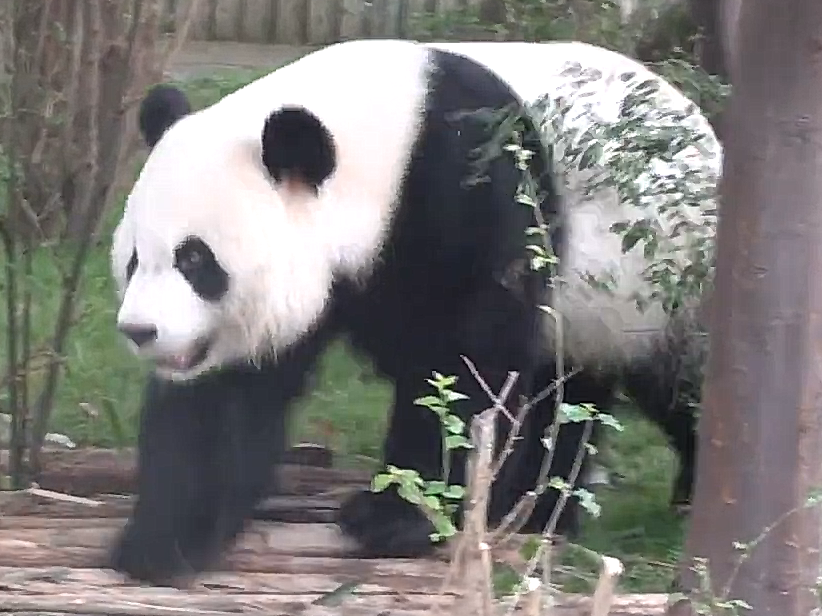
- Xi Lan in Chengdu in 2015
- Other names: simplified Chinese: 喜兰; traditional Chinese: 喜蘭
- Species: Giant panda
- Sex: Male
- Born: August 30, 2008 (age 18); Zoo Atlanta
- Parents: Yang Yang (father); Lun Lun (mother)

Xi Lan (simplified Chinese: 喜兰; traditional Chinese: 喜蘭; lit. 'Joyful orchid' or 'Atlanta's joy'; born August 30, 2008 (Note: Zoo Atlanta erroneously lists his birth date as April 30, 2008.)) is a male giant panda cub born at Zoo Atlanta to Lun Lun and Yang Yang, who were sent to the zoo in 1999 as part of panda diplomacy. He is the younger brother of Mei Lan, who was born at Zoo Atlanta in 2006; and the older brother of five other siblings. His older brother, Mei Lan, was born on September 6, 2006, after Lun Lun spent 36 hours in labor. Xi Lan's younger siblings, Po (born November 3, 2010), twins Mei Lun and Mei Huan (born July 15, 2013), and twins Ya Lun and Xi Lun (born September 3, 2016), were all born at Zoo Atlanta. Xi Lan's name was selected from eleven other names in a poll and revealed during a 100-day naming ceremony.

Xi Lan and Po returned to China on May 12, 2014, and, as of October 2024, he is living at the Chengdu Panda Base with his parents, Po, Mei Lun, Mei Huan, and Mei Lan, who had already returned to China in February 2010.

== See also ==
- List of individual giant pandas
- List of individual bears
