= Chen Xiyao =

Chinese-born classical musician

Chen Xiyao 陈希垚
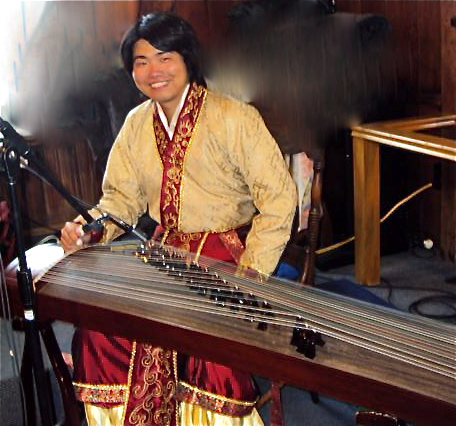
- Chen Xiyao at his guzheng

Background information
- Born: Chen Xiyao; 1984 (age 41–42); Beijing, China
- Origin: China
- Instruments: guzheng, piano

Chen Xi Yao (simplified Chinese: 陈希垚; traditional Chinese: 陳希垚; pinyin: Chén Xīyáo; Wade–Giles: Chun She Yow; born 1984) is a Chinese-born classical musician. He is a guzheng (Chinese zither) player and pianist. He currently lives in Beijing but spent a number of years in New Zealand.

== Early life ==
Yao was born and raised in a well-known traditional Chinese musical family in Beijing, China. His grandfather, Cao Dongfu (曹东扶) was a famous composer and guzheng master, as well as one of the founders of the China Central Conservatory of Music in Beijing and the Sichuan Conservatory of Music. His mother, Li Bian, is a guzheng professor who holds the "National First Rank" Performer title in China, and is the only Guzheng Master granted the title of “Son of the East” from the Chinese Government in 1997. His father, Chen Chuan Rong, is a professional conductor and erhu player.

Yao began learning Western classical music theory and piano when he was four years old, and the guzheng at eight, from his mother. He also played the guzheng as a solo artist or as part of a group at a very young age in frequent national and international concerts. He competed in a number of Chinese national and international guzheng competitions, winning several gold awards in 1996. In 1997, Yao played a guzheng solo in the 13th International Youth Arts Festival in Japan and won critical acclaim from international professionals. He has featured in TV programs and live shows on Beijing TV and China Central TV. In 2001, Yao won the Gold Medal in the Beijing Regional competition and the Silver medal in the National competition of the China National Fresh Young Artists Competition organised by the Chinese Ministry of Culture and Arts.

He also assisted his mother teaching students in China and has received several Chinese national honorary awards for teaching teenagers to play Chinese musical instruments and for assisting in the training of students participating in China's nationwide Traditional Chinese Music Professional Examinations. Now he is a Member of the China Musicians Association's guzheng branch, member and teacher of China Nationalities Orchestra Society and an examiner for the China National Arts grading system.

== In New Zealand ==
Yao arrived in New Zealand to study in 2002, living in Timaru and Christchurch in the first three years and moving to Hamilton in 2004. Following studying at school, university (gaining a degree in Business Administration) and then at Wintec, he teaches and performs on the guzheng for local communities and plays as a solo guzheng and piano performer in churches, retirement homes, schools, and in public at many social and community events. He finished his studies at Wintec in 2011, gaining Wintec's first ever Master of Arts (with Distinction) by an international student. His year-long masters study culminated in the recording of 11 traditional and contemporary guzheng music pieces.

In his dissertation, he set out to explain the importance of the traditional genre for today's guzheng performers, and why this genre is slowly disappearing in modern China. He identified the following reasons for the loss of traditional genres of music in China: modern teaching methods; the impact of new political rules; Western influence on Chinese education and the Chinese Cultural Revolution.

Yao works at present as Chief Music Consultant at the NZ School of Traditional Chinese Music and Performing Arts Charitable Trust in Hamilton, New Zealand.

On behalf of the Trust, he was invited by the British Council of New Zealand to join the “People in Your Neighbourhood” project with a selection of New Zealand Artists and the Urban Soul Orchestra from UK to perform at the World of Music, Arts and Dance (WOMAD)

He has taught students aged from 9 to 55 in New Zealand since 2002, most being migrants originally from Taiwan, China and Malaysia, and Yao became the first Chinese artist to be presented with an award for ‘Outstanding Services to the Arts’ from Arts Waikato in the Waikato region, New Zealand.

NZ Symphony Orchestra began to sponsor Yao and he gained a work-to-residence visa under the Talent (Arts, Culture and Sports) category by the New Zealand Immigration Service, possibly the first time ever that this type of visa has been granted for a performer of a traditional Chinese instrument. He is now a permanent resident in New Zealand under the "Exceptional Talent" category.

== Recent activities ==
Yao has had a number of engagements with the New Zealand China Friendship Society.

In 2011, he took part as a guzheng player accompanist in ‘The Bone Feeder', a play by Kiwi Chinese Renee Liang.

In 2013, Yao performed a very successful concert with NZ Trio in Auckland receiving NZ Herald good reviews and in 2014 he was invited by the Confucius Institute to perform at the Chinese New Year function held by the Wellington City Council. Other successes include a pre-concert exhibition of Forbidden City of Chamber of Music from China at the Hamilton Gallagher Academy of Performing Arts and composition pieces in particular ‘The River’ performed with Hawke's Bay Youth Orchestra.

Possibly the highlight of Yao's career so far came in 2015 when he performed in front of NZ Prime Minister John Key and Chinese Ambassador Wang Lu Tong at a function in Parliament at Chinese New Year. Many other performances followed and Yao got the opportunity to introduce his music to the nation when he was interviewed by Radio NZ and by the Chinese Herald Newspaper in Auckland which gave his story on the front page.

He was interviewed by staff from the NZ Government Ethnic Affairs Ministry resulting in an article on the Ministry websiteL ‘From Tradition to Heavy Metal’.

Gradually his fame spread and in June 2015 the NZ TV 3 programme ‘Both Worlds’ covered his musical career in China and New Zealand.

Yao has featured in the following Chinese media, which covered his musical career and experience and his work in promoting Chinese culture in New Zealand: TV: China Chongqing TV; CCTV 4 and newspapers: ‘China Daily’; ‘China Culture Daily’ and ‘Chongqing Daily’. Reporters filmed and interviewed Yao in both China and New Zealand.

Many concerts followed including Hamilton City Council's monthly concerts and the University of Waikato solo concert. In addition Yao ran workshops and master classes at University of Victoria, Wellington. He has co-operated with a number of High Schools [for example, ‘One Belt One Road Culture Blending Concert at Tauranga Boys College, as well as writing music for the new opera-version of ‘Bonefeeders’ (Auckland Art Festival) – blending Chinese and Maori music, as well as Western music.

He performed in front of two NZ Prime Ministers: Rt. Hon. John Key and Rt. Hon. Bill English. He also worked with well-known New Zealand composers Gareth Farr and Jack Body as well as Renee Liang, the poet [‘Bone Feeders’].

Yao worked as a music tutor/lecturer and he supervised Chinese international MA students for Wintec [Waikato Institute of Technology] in Hamilton, NZ. He continued his lecturing at Beijing Contemporary Music Academy involving running master classes in blending Chinese music with Western music.

Yao currently lives in Beijing. He is working on setting up a music school in Ningbo.

In 2025, Education New Zealand produced a documentary featuring Chen Xiyao to promote New Zealand’s educational philosophy worldwide.
