= Chengdu Research Base of Giant Panda Breeding =

Public non-profit research institute in Chengdu, China

Coordinates: 30°44′19″N 104°8′31″E

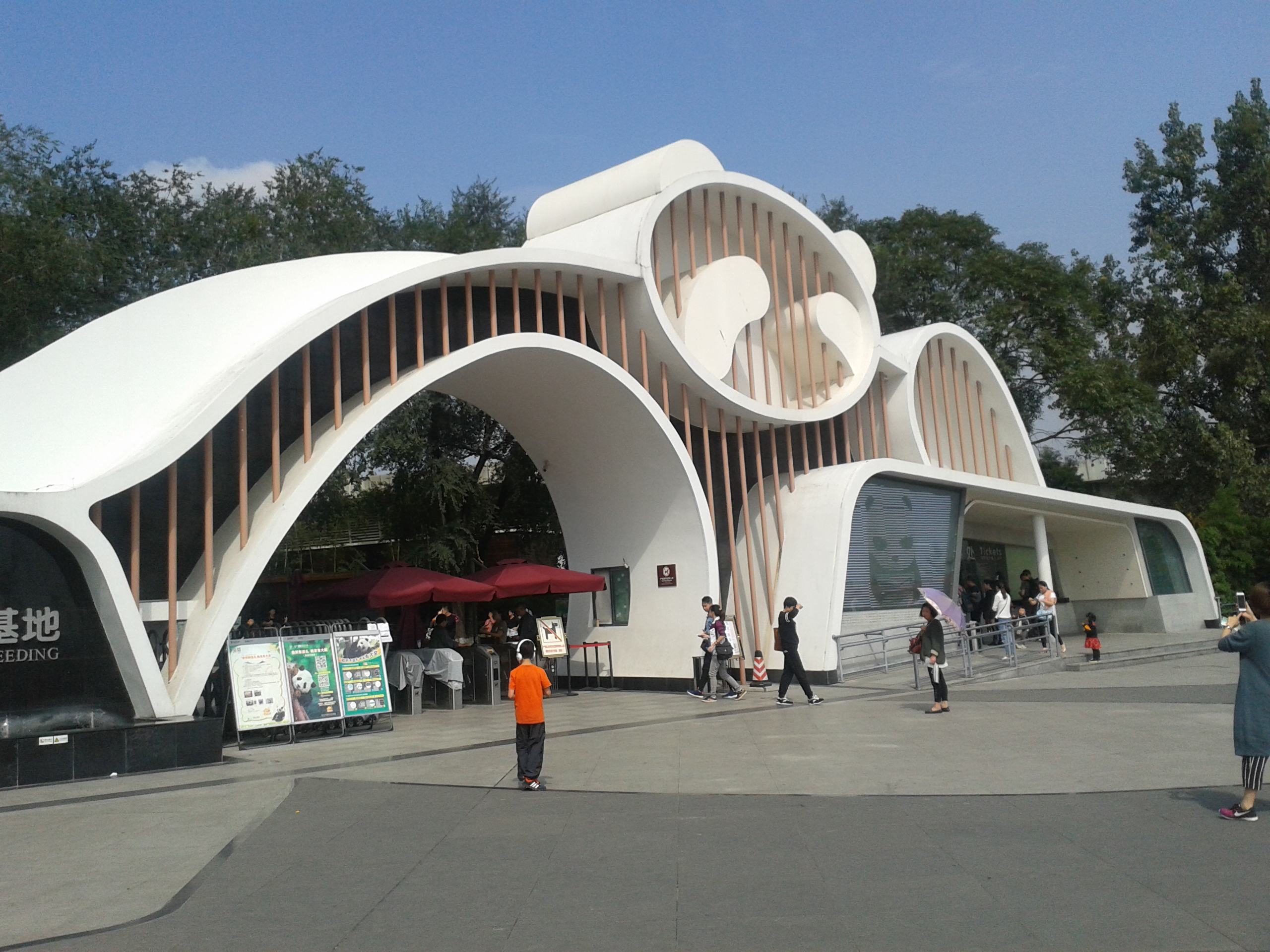
- Entrance
- Other name: 成都大熊猫繁育研究基地
- Parent institution: Chengdu Municipal Park-City Construction and Management Bureau
- Founder: Chengdu Municipal People's Government
- Established: 1987
- Mission: Protect and breed giant pandas, red pandas and other endangered wild animals endemic to China
- Website: panda.org.cn

The Chengdu Research Base of Giant Panda Breeding (or simply Chengdu Panda Base) is a government-funded non-profit breeding and research institute for giant pandas, red pandas, and other rare animals, located in Chengdu, Sichuan, China.

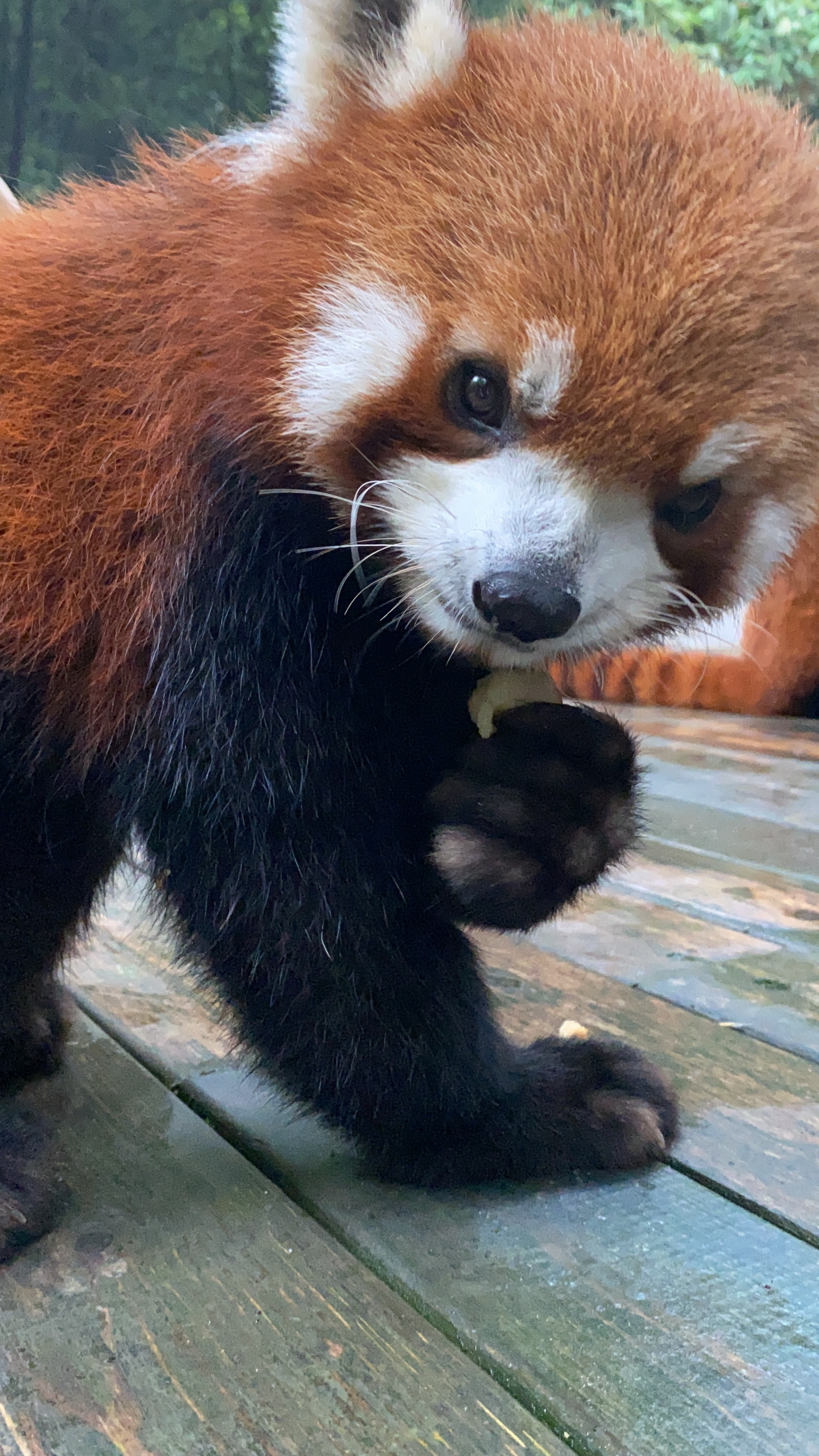
Red panda in Chengdu Panda Breeding Research Center Dujiangyan Breeding Yefang Research Center

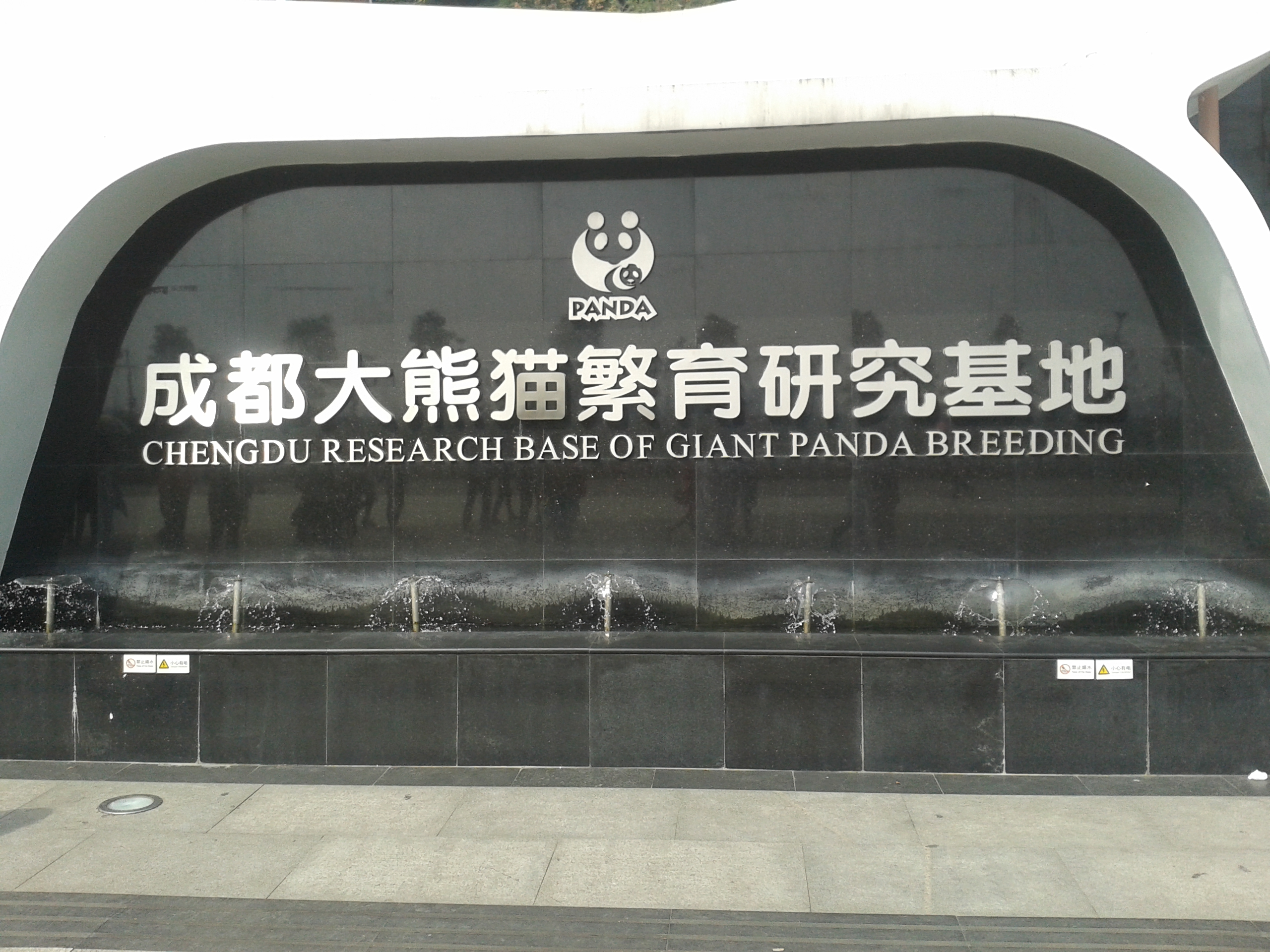
Entrance sign

Chengdu Panda Base was founded in 1987 by the Chengdu Municipal People's Government. It started with six giant pandas that were rescued from the wild. By 2008, the research base had 124 panda births, and the captive panda population has grown to 83. It aimed to "be a world-class research facility, conservation education center, and international educational tourism destination."

== Partnerships ==
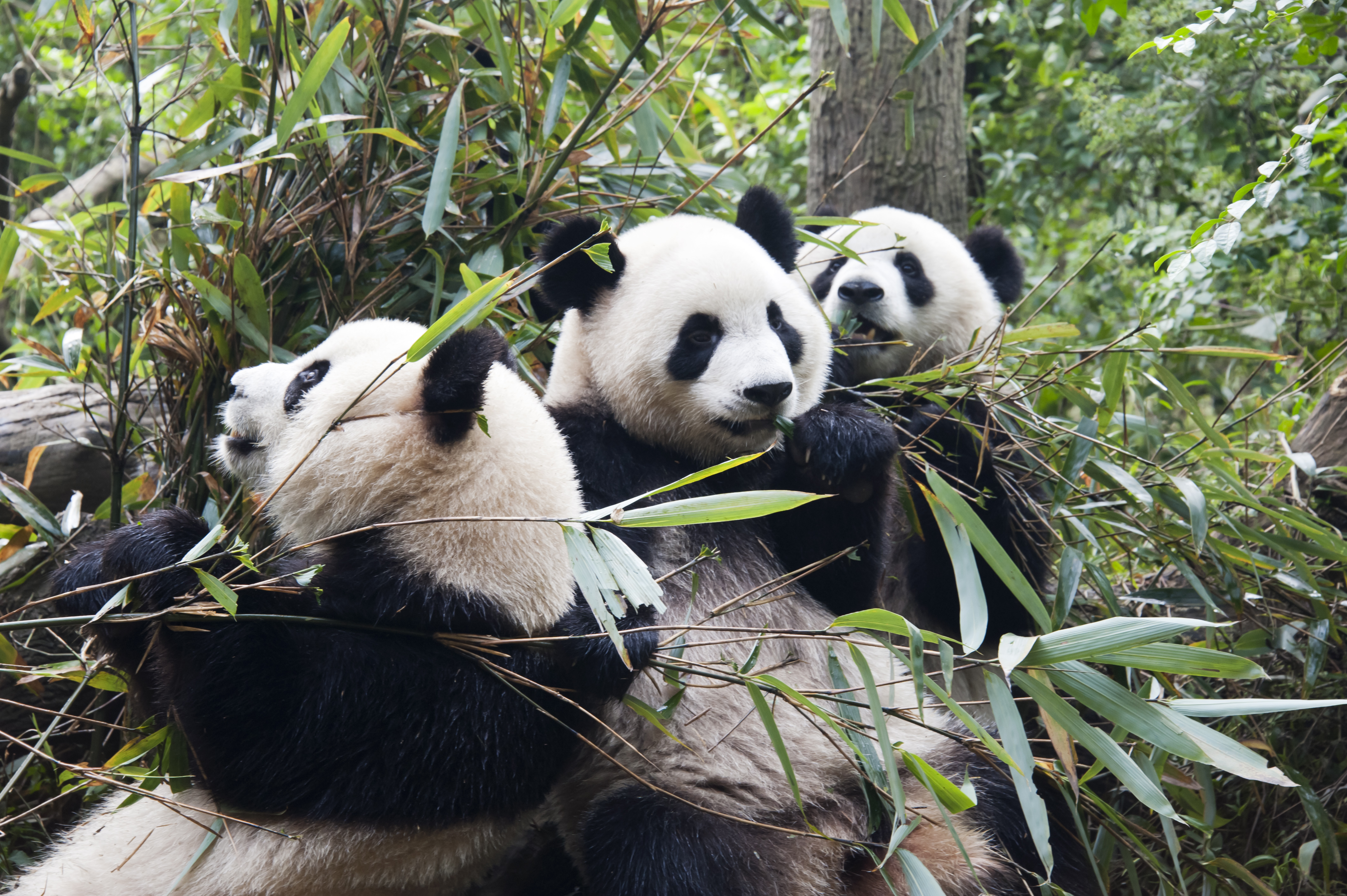
Trio of pandas inside the research base in 2011

Chengdu Panda Base has partnered with many organizations in improving ways to conserve giant pandas. For example, its partnership with Zoo Atlanta helped the zoo secure the loan of two giant pandas. To date, these two giant pandas, Yang Yang and Lun Lun, have produced five cubs: Mei Lan in 2006, Xi Lan in 2008, Po on November 3, 2010, twins Mei Lun and Mei Huan on July 15, 2013, and twins Ya Lun and Xi Lun on September 3, 2016.

Other research partners include:

- Adventure World in Shirahama, Wakayama, Japan
- East Bay Zoological Society, Oakland, California, United States
- University of Liverpool, England, United Kingdom
- National Institute of Health/National Cancer Institution, United States
- National Zoological Park, Washington, D.C., United States
- Nihon University, Tokyo, Japan
- North of England Zoological Society, England, UK
- The Oakland China Wildlife Preservation Foundation, California, United States
- San Diego Zoo, California, United States
- University of Japan
- Edinburgh Zoo, Scotland, United Kingdom
- Calgary Zoo, Calgary, Alberta, Canada
- Zoo/Tierpark Berlin, Germany

On April 11, 2013, Chengdu Research Base of Giant Panda Breeding and CNTV reached an agreement on the establishment of iPanda.com after an official signing ceremony, and they immediately started preparing for the test launch, which was estimated that same year in June.

== Incidents ==
In February 2024, the institute made international headlines after it banned a 53-year-old male visitor for life for throwing unspecified objects into a giant panda enclosure.

== See also ==
- Captive breeding
- Wolong National Nature Reserve
- Giant pandas around the world
