= Zou Lunlun =

Zou Lunlun (simplified Chinese: 邹伦伦; traditional Chinese: 鄒倫倫; pinyin: Zōu Lúnlún) is a player and teacher of the guzheng, a Chinese zither.

She is fourth-generation guzheng player in a family of musicians. She has performed concerts in Vienna and Sydney, and performed for China's President Jiang Zemin and Australian Prime Minister John Howard.

While she lived in Australia, Lunlun established a Chinese traditional music group, "3 Sisters", with pipa player (Lulu Liu), and erhu player (Yingying Liu).

She has recorded a CD called Spring Hope by the Art Tune Recording Company of Hong Kong. She currently performs and teaches in Hong Kong.
