= Liu Weishan =

Weishan Liu (劉維姍) is a guzheng (Chinese zither) master performer, composer and educator, based in San Francisco, California, United States. She studied at the Shenyang Conservatory of Music from 1949 onwards.
