= Pattycake (gorilla) =

Gorilla born in Central Park Zoo

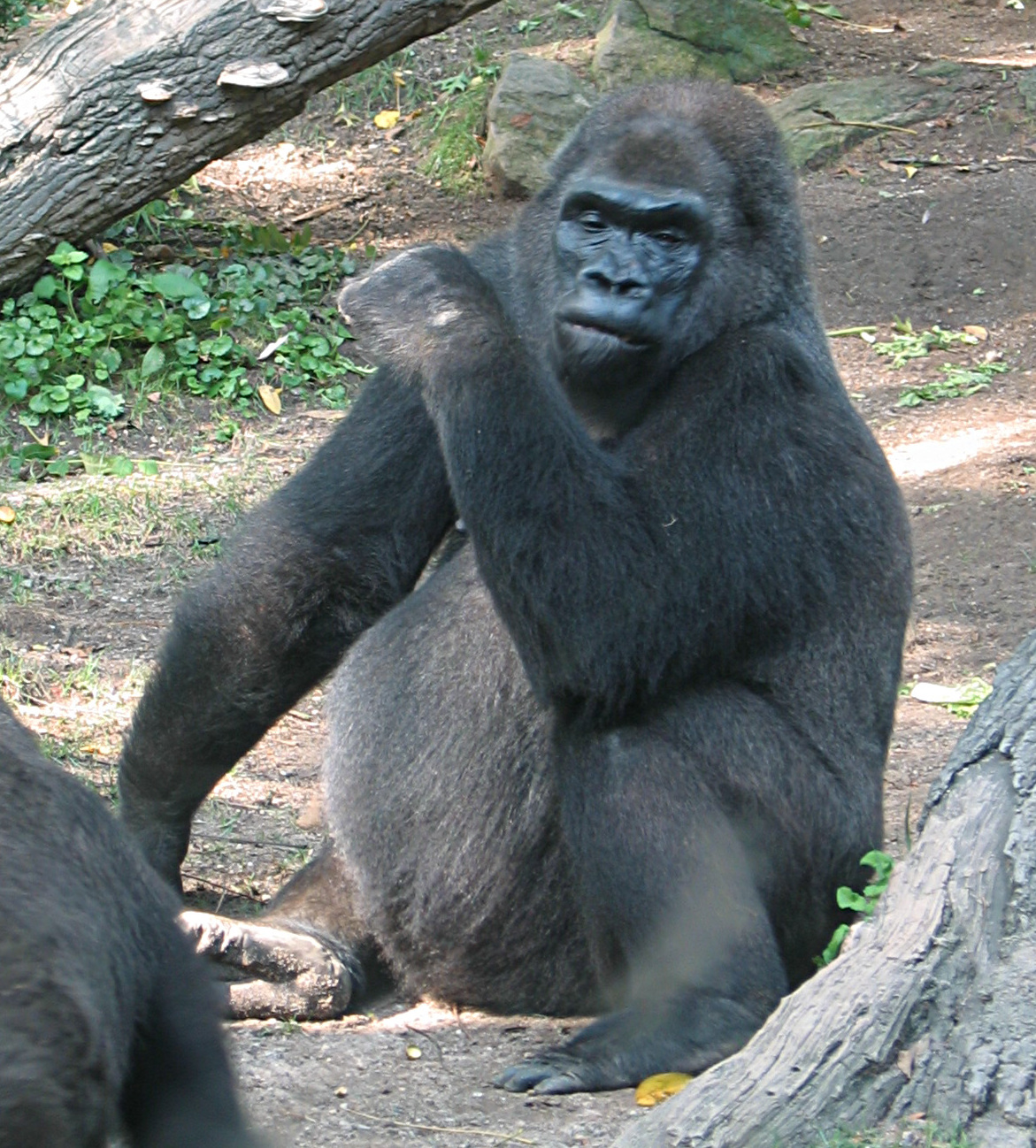
- Photo from 2004
- Species: Western lowland gorilla
- Sex: Female
- Born: September 3, 1972; Central Park Zoo, New York City, United States
- Died: March 31, 2013 (aged 40); Bronx Zoo, New York, United States
- Known for: First gorilla born in captivity in New York
- Parents: Lulu (1964–2011), Kongo (1965–1998)
- Offspring: 10

Pattycake, also known as Patty Cake (September 3, 1972 – March 31, 2013) was a female western lowland gorilla (Gorilla gorilla gorilla) born to Lulu and Kongo at the Central Park Zoo in New York City. She was the first baby gorilla successfully born in captivity in New York. Months after her much publicized birth, Pattycake's arm was broken when it got stuck in her cage as her mother grabbed her away from her father. The incident was sensationally anthropomorphized in the media as a domestic dispute between Lulu and Kongo, but in reality experts thought it was a simple accident.

Her injury was treated at the Bronx Zoo while a custody dispute between the two zoos broke out in public and elicited a range of opinions from experts who believed Pattycake should be returned to her mother. Intense media coverage and public interest brought Pattycake to the attention of a wide audience, with stories focusing on her recovery, her eventual reunion with her parents, and the conditions of zoo animals in Central Park. An ambitious proposal for renovating the Central Park Zoo arose in the wake of the controversy while the zoo received record attendance rates.

Pattycake was the "child star" of New York City in the early 1970s, and her fame was compared to Shirley Temple. At a time when New York City was facing many problems, she distracted the public from their growing anxieties and became a welcome relief for New Yorkers and their children who loved to visit her. After spending the first decade of her life at the Central Park Zoo, Pattycake moved permanently to the Bronx Zoo in 1982. She was the mother of ten baby gorillas, including twins born in 1995. Pattycake spent her later life as an independent but caring troop matriarch in the Bronx Zoo's Congo Gorilla Forest exhibit. After suffering from arthritis and cardiac problems for some time, Pattycake succumbed to heart disease in 2013.

== Birth ==
"Pattycake" was born on September 3, 1972, to western lowland gorilla parents Lulu and Kongo at the Central Park Zoo. Lulu and Kongo first arrived at the zoo on May 11, 1966. At the time, it was thought that Lulu wasn't mature enough to conceive, so when Lulu gave birth to Pattycake at the age of 8, it came as a surprise. Up until the time Lulu gave birth, it had been very difficult to get captive gorilla mothers to raise their young in zoos because the babies would either be rejected by the mother or they would be taken away by the handlers. Pattycake was the first gorilla successfully born in captivity in New York.

At the time of her birth, it was unknown if she was a male or female, as it was considered too dangerous to approach her and her parents. Her handlers assumed she was a male and originally named her "Sonny Jim". When it was established that Pattycake was a female, a contest was held by the New York Daily News to find her a name. "Patty Cake", the winning entry, was submitted by New York fireman John O'Connor, who named the gorilla after his wife and a proposed daughter. "It just so happens that we have three boys and I told my wife that if we ever have a girl, we should name her Patty, which happens to be her name. I thought we'd let the baby gorilla use the name in the meantime," O'Connor told reporters.

Pattycake's birth caught the attention of the city and brought crowds of thousands of New Yorkers to the Central Park Zoo. Reporter N. R. Kleinfield called her a child star whose "furry face served as a bit of a respite at a time when the city found itself grappling with high crime rates and an intensifying financial crisis." Six months after Pattycake was born, the director of the zoo estimated that based on the crowds, she might draw an additional 500,000 visitors by the time of her first birthday.

== Custody dispute ==
At the age of five months, Pattycake was sharing the Lion House with Lulu and Kongo at the Central Park Zoo. On March 20, 1973, an accident occurred that was attributed more to clumsiness than to parenting skills. Although no staff were on hand to see it directly, according to visitors, while little Pattycake was reaching out to her father through the bars of her cage, her right arm became stuck somehow when her mother Lulu pulled her away, breaking her right arm. Zoo handlers had to subdue Lulu with a tranquilizer dart to remove Pattycake and treat her injury. While experts considered the incident an accident, the media sensationalized the event. Zookeeper Veronica Nelson, who worked with Patty Cake, recalled that

The news media would have liked to have it a dramatic bloody mess—a struggle between mom and pop for the custody of the child. It was nothing like that. It was a simple accident. Kongo was in one part of the double cage, Lulu in another, and between them was a partition of narrow bars. Lulu had Patty Cake in her arms and when Patty reached in between the narrow bars to touch her father, Lulu suddenly pulled her away. But Patty's arm got caught in the narrow bars and broke. It was a freak accident. No one ever realized that those bars were narrow enough to catch that tiny arm.

Pattycake was brought to New York Medical College for surgery and she was given a cast for her arm. Due to concerns that Lulu would try to remove Pattycake's cast, she was separated from her mother and moved to the Bronx Zoo for convalescence. Pattycake was treated by veterinarian Emil Dolensek who later replaced her cast with a sling. After an examination, the staff discovered that Pattycake had intestinal parasites and determined she was underfed.

A custody dispute began between the two zoos, with the Bronx Zoo arguing that she would be better cared for in their facilities. Time magazine noted that it was the "custody battle of the decade" in the "primate world", comparing Patty Cake's popularity and fame to that of child star Shirley Temple. Developmental biologist Ronald Nadler of the Yerkes National Primate Research Center was brought in to arbitrate the dispute and published a report that favored returning Pattycake to her mother and the Central Park Zoo. In his report Nadler noted that "the recommendation is based on the judgment that an infant gorilla is more likely to develop into a socially competent and reproductively adequate animal if it is raised in the company of its parents as opposed to being raised with a group of peers."

After three months recuperating from her injuries, Pattycake was returned to her mother on June 15, 1973. The entire incident was documented by artist Susan Green in her book Gentle Gorilla: The Story of Patty Cake (1978).

== Central Park Zoo conditions ==
By the 1970s, animal welfare organizations began to voice their increasing concern with the treatment of zoo animals and the conditions of their enclosures at the Central Park Zoo. The Humane Society of the United States, the Friends of the Zoo, and the Society for Animal Rights decried the prison-like conditions of the cages and called for immediate changes. The New York Zoological Society, which was responsible for creating realistic habitat enclosures at the Bronx Zoo, also began calling for changes and for Pattycake to be moved to another zoo. A renovation plan for the Central Park Zoo was approved in 1981, with plans made to move the gorillas to larger spaces in other zoos. The New York Times reported that "the caging of these animals in inadequate spaces has long enraged animal lovers."

== Bronx Zoo ==
Pattycake moved permanently to the Bronx Zoo on December 20, 1982, just before the Central Park Zoo closed for renovations in 1983. For a few years, she lived in a cage with Pansy, a chimpanzee. In June 1999, Pattycake moved into the Wildlife Conservation Society's $43 million Congo Gorilla Forest exhibit. The exhibit includes a Great Gorilla Forest viewing area that separates gorillas and visitors with a glass window. Two troops of gorillas inhabited the 6.5-acre (2.6 ha) exhibit, with a dozen gorillas in Pattycake's troop alone, including Fubo, Pattycake, Tunko, Triska, Halima, Fran, Layla, Kumi, Suki, Babatunde, Barbara, and M'domo. The general curator of the Bronx Zoo, James Doherty, described Pattycake as "independent" with "few close friends" in the Congo Gorilla Forest. "It may have something to do with the fact that she didn't live with her parents that long, and lived with that chimpanzee for a few years," Doherty said.

== Breeding and offspring ==
Pattycake gave birth to her first baby, Tumai, a male gorilla, on January 20, 1985. Tumai was sired by Bendera. Pattycake and Bendera had a second baby on March 23, 1986, but it died soon after birth. With Barney, Pattycake gave birth to three babies: a female named Paki, on May 26, 1989, followed by Patrick on April 19, 1990, and Husani on December 14, 1991. Paki gave birth to Pattycake's only grandchild, Pendeka, in 1998.

In October 1991, a silverback named Timmy (1959–2011) was taken away from Kate, his infertile companion at the Cleveland Metroparks Zoo, in the hopes of breeding lowland gorillas and introducing new genes into the captive gorilla gene pool. This forced separation led to protests from animal rights activists who expressed concerns about the potential consequences of emotional trauma on the two gorillas. The Association of Zoos and Aquariums Species Survival Plan sent Timmy to the Bronx Zoo where he joined Pattycake and other females.

On July 11, 1993, Pattycake and Timmy gave birth to Okpara, a male gorilla. The pair also gave birth to twin males, Ngoma and Tambo, on August 8, 1994. It was the sixth time western lowland gorillas had given birth to twins in captivity. The twins were raised in a separate habitat by surrogate mothers. After seven years, Ngoma and Tambo, along with another gorilla named Dan, left for a zoo in Nebraska in February 2001. On February 4, 2001, Pattycake and Zuri gave birth to Dossi, a female. Her last and tenth baby gorilla, a male, was delivered on April 15, 2002. Unnamed, it died four days later.

== Later life ==
Kongo, Pattycake's father, died in 1998. In 2002, the Pattycake Fund was established to raise $250,000 to stop illegal poaching of African gorillas. The fundraising coincided with Pattycake's 30th birthday, commemorated with a two-day celebration at the Bronx Zoo. A special cake was made for her from kale, gelatin, yogurt, and berries.

Timmy, along with two female gorillas, Tunuka and Paki, left the Bronx Zoo for the Louisville Zoo in May 2004.

Pattycake tried her hand at painting while participating with the Wildlife Conservation Society (WCS) animal enrichment program at the Bronx Zoo. A sample of her work was published in the 2010 WCS Annual Report.

Pattycake's mother Lulu died in early 2011.

Pattycake suffered from chronic heart disease and arthritis as she aged. She was one of 338 captive zoo gorillas within North America when she died in her sleep at the age of 40. According to the Wildlife Conservation Society, Pattycake exceeded the median life span of 37 years for female zoo gorillas.

== Cultural depictions ==
In honor of Pattycake, the Rev. Frederick Douglass Kirkpatrick (Brother Kirk) joined Pete Seeger and the Sesame Street kids chorus for the song "Patty Cake Gorilla", released on the album Pete Seeger and Brother Kirk Visit Sesame Street (1974). A picture book called Patty Cake (1974), featuring New York Times photographer Neal Boenzi and others, was written by Elizabeth Moody. Pearl Wolf wrote Gorilla Baby: The Story of Patty Cake (1974), a picture book for children. Artist Susan Green published her direct, personal observations about the custody dispute (along with her drawings) in the book Gentle Gorilla: The Story of Patty Cake (1978).

== See also ==
- List of individual apes
