= James C. Kulhanek =

- Self-Portrait by Kulhanek
- Born: April 23, 1908; Cleveland, Ohio
- Died: April 1, 1990 (aged 81); Cleveland, Ohio
- Education: Cleveland School of Art
- Known for: Painting, drawing, commercial art

James Charles Kulhanek (April 23, 1908 – April 1, 1990) was an American commercial artist and designer.

== Early life ==
Václav Kulhánek and Anna Kulhánek, née Veleba, the parents of James C. Kulhanek, were born in Bohemia within Austria-Hungary and settled in Cleveland in the 1900s. James C. Kulhanek was born there on April 23, 1908.

Kulhanek was a student of Henry Keller at the Cleveland School of Art.

== Zoo polar bear attack ==
In 1938, Kulhanek was a witness to an incident at Brookside Zoo where Judy Zemnick, another WPA artist, was pulled into a polar bear enclosure and clawed. Kulhanek and another artist called for help and tried to drive the bear away from Ms. Zemnick. The incident received extensive press coverage at the time and for two years following.

== Portrait of Dennis John Kucinich ==
In December 1989, Kulhanek discovered that Dennis Kucinich, the 53rd mayor (Democrat) of the city of Cleveland, Ohio, was (idiosyncratically) not represented by a portrait at City Hall. Oil paintings of many of his peers, mayors long past as well as contemporary, could either be found within the ceremonial Red Room or one of the building's many offices, conference rooms, or corridors.

No official policy had hitherto been established concerning the commissioning of a mayor's portrait on the part of the municipality. Historically, mayoral portraits had never been commissioned en masse by Cleveland residents nor paid for out of public funds. Generally, such undertakings were subsidized out of private resources. Kulhanek rose to rectify this intriguing phenomena, gratis.

Dying of terminal stomach cancer, Kulhanek channeled the last vestiges of his failing strength into the project. Informed of the artist's undertaking, Kucinich visited the Kulhanek household and posed. Taking up his oils, the terminally ill old-world artist was buoyed by the assurance that he was painting the capstone of his career. He envisioned its warm reception, and a grateful citizenry hanging it with pride

Kulhanek depicted an age-appropriate Kucinich seated at his desk in the mayor's office. Prominently featured upon the wall behind him was an image of Muny Light (known now as Cleveland Public Power). The artist applied his last brushstroke to the canvas in January 1990 - what would be three months prior to his death.

A week before Kulhanek was to die (at the age of 81 on April 1, 1990), he received another visit by Kucinich. Ken Wood, staff writer for The News Sun (a community newspaper that served five of Cleveland's suburbs), wrote about Kucinich's reaction to the finished canvas. He was "very humbled" by Kulhanek's having given "so unselfishly of his considerable talents." He judged that the artist had a "keen understanding of the values (he) stood for as mayor," and captured his likeness and communicated the nuances of his term in office, "particularly with respect to the issue of light and power." Additionally, Kucinich expressed his amenability to that portrait serving as his official one at City Hall (should he be granted that mark of recognition by the then sitting administration of Mayor Michael White). Contacting a spokesperson for the White administration, Kucinich related Kulhanek's epic undertaking, and requested that the dying artist's wish - that the portrait (which he was prepared to donate) serve his intended purpose - be fulfilled.

Over the course of the ensuing months, Mayor White's Press Secretary, Alan Seifullah, made inquiries of Kulhanek's widow, Joyce, and their son, James Jr., about the portrait (which remained at the Kulhanek home). Although its formal acquisition by the Cleveland municipality, and its public unveiling at City Hall were never refused (outright), neither were they certified.

The matter remained dormant until 2002 when Cleveland's 56th mayor, Jane Louise Campbell (the first female to have been elected as the city's mayor in its 206 year history), announced an initiative to raise $40,000 to commission a Kucinich portrait. Hoping to dissuade the municipality from a costly (and seemingly unnecessary) enterprise, James Kulhanek, Jr., wrote to Mayor Campbell about his late father's portrait of Mr. Kucinich. Its undertaking having received its subject's blessing, participation, and approval, the painting would satisfy that desire without any fiduciary expenditure. After due deliberation, labor leader John Ryan was authorized by the Campbell administration to communicate to the Kulhanek family its perspective concerning the painting: though deemed an admirable likeness skillfully rendered, the portrait was evaluated as being markedly varied in tone, style, and technique to the majority of those portraits throughout city hall of Kucinich's predecessors and successors. The perceived variances between them was deemed likely to inhibit an overall aesthetic harmony.

When approached for his personal opinion regarding the portrait's dismissal, Kucinich (who was then a congressman), replied that the ". . . administration believed it was not in keeping with the style of other mayoral portraits . . . It was never my intention to have a portrait, and forgot about the matter.". Today, the portrait is among the oeuvre of paintings executed by James C. Kulhanek preserved by his son, James Jr.

== Work ==
Between 1935 and 1942, Kulhanek received Federal Art Project commissions through New Deal Works Progress Administration- sponsored art projects, such as the rendering of several prints of elks, great horned owls, and reindeer, now in the collection of Case Western University. He also painted panels to be installed in the hallways of Collinwood and Lincoln High Schools as well as the Federal Courthouse. Shortly before Kulhanek's death, the artist painted a portrait of former Cleveland mayor Dennis Kucinich, who actually sat for Kulhanek, although the portrait was never displayed in Cleveland City Hall.

== Selected works ==
Interurban Stop

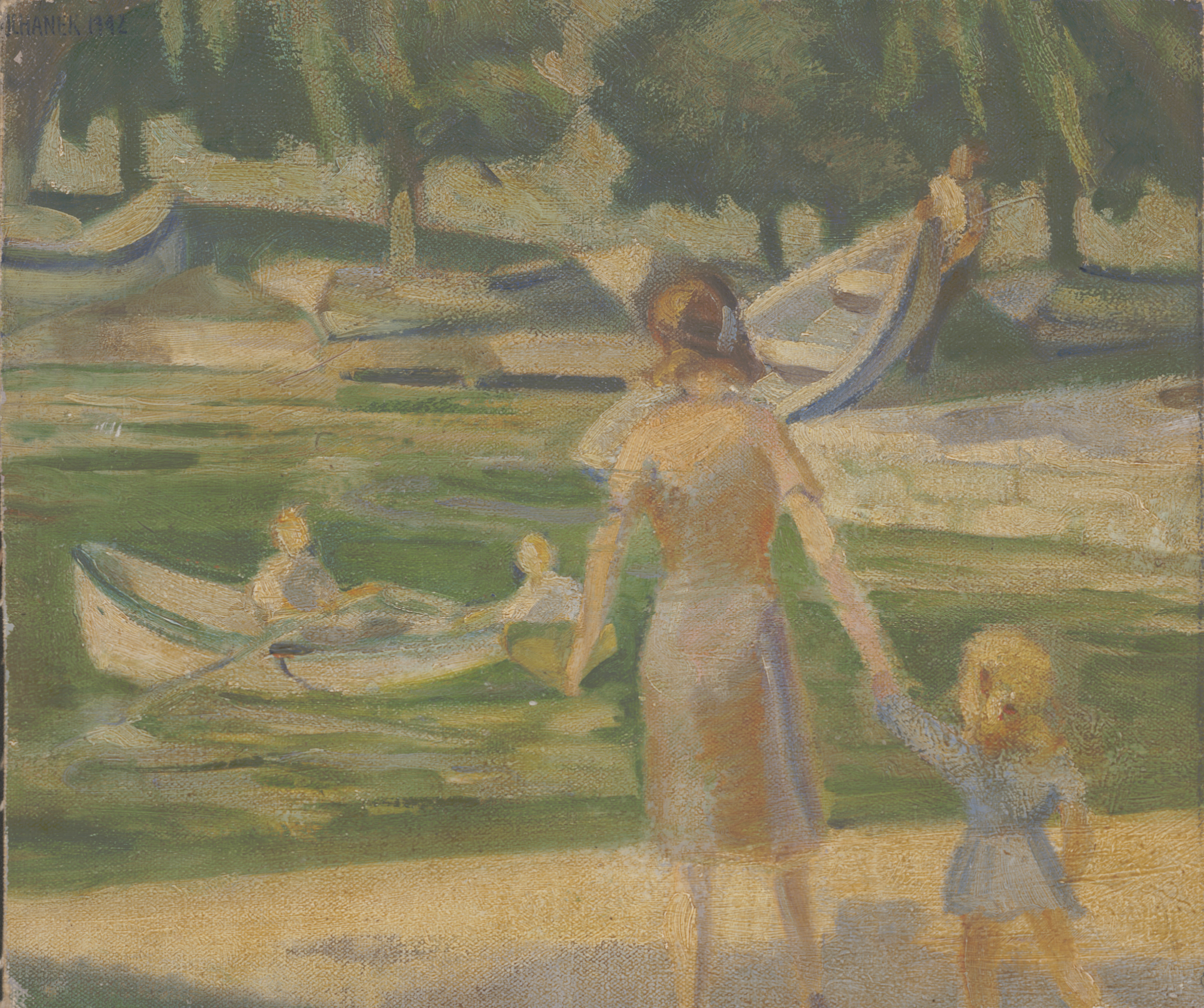
Boat Livery Brookside Zoo

Whistle Stop

Stutz Last Run (1967)

On Silent Wings

Meditation (1962)

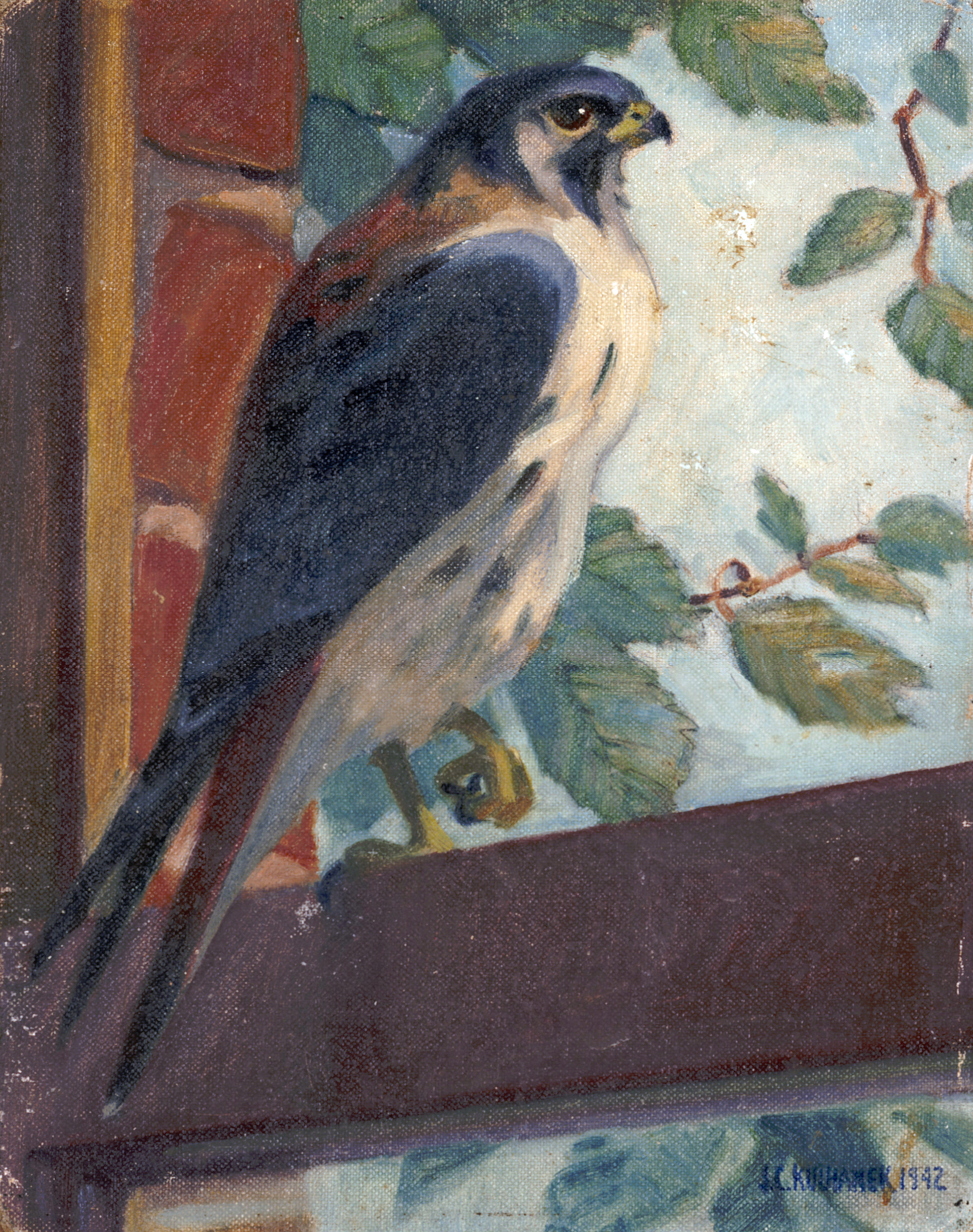
American Kestrel (1942)

Ann Kulhanek-Becka
