= Cleveland Metroparks Zoo =

Zoo in Cleveland, Ohio, United States

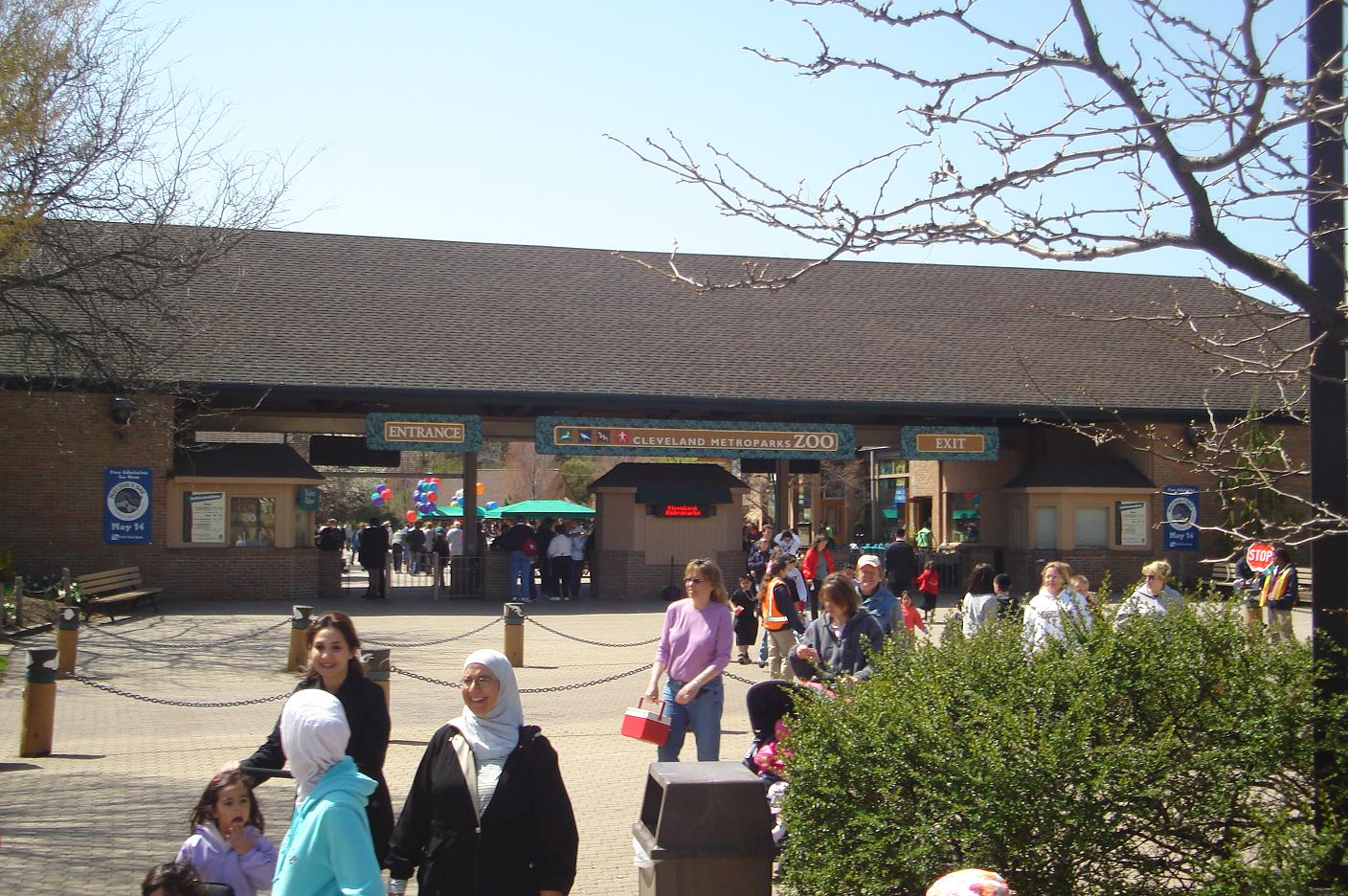
- Cleveland Metroparks Zoo Entrance
- Interactive map of Cleveland Metroparks Zoo
- 41.447°N 81.712°W
- Date opened: 1882
- Location: Cleveland, Ohio, United States
- Land area: 183 acres (74 ha)
- No. of animals: 3000
- No. of species: 600+
- Annual visitors: 1.32 million (2023)
- Memberships: AZA
- Public transit: RTA: 51 / 51A, 53 / 53A
- Website: clevelandmetroparks.com/zoo

The Cleveland Metroparks Zoo is a 183-acre (74 ha) zoo in Cleveland, Ohio. The Zoo is divided into several areas: Australian Adventure; African Savanna; Northern Wilderness Trek, The Primate, Cat & Aquatics Building, Waterfowl Lake, The RainForest, Asian Highlands, and the newly added Susie's Bear Hollow. Cleveland Metroparks Zoo has one of the largest collections of primates in North America. The Zoo is a part of the Cleveland Metroparks system.

The Cleveland Metroparks Zoo (CMZ) was founded in 1882. It is one of the most popular year-round attractions in Northeast Ohio with an attendance of 1.32 million in 2023.

== History ==
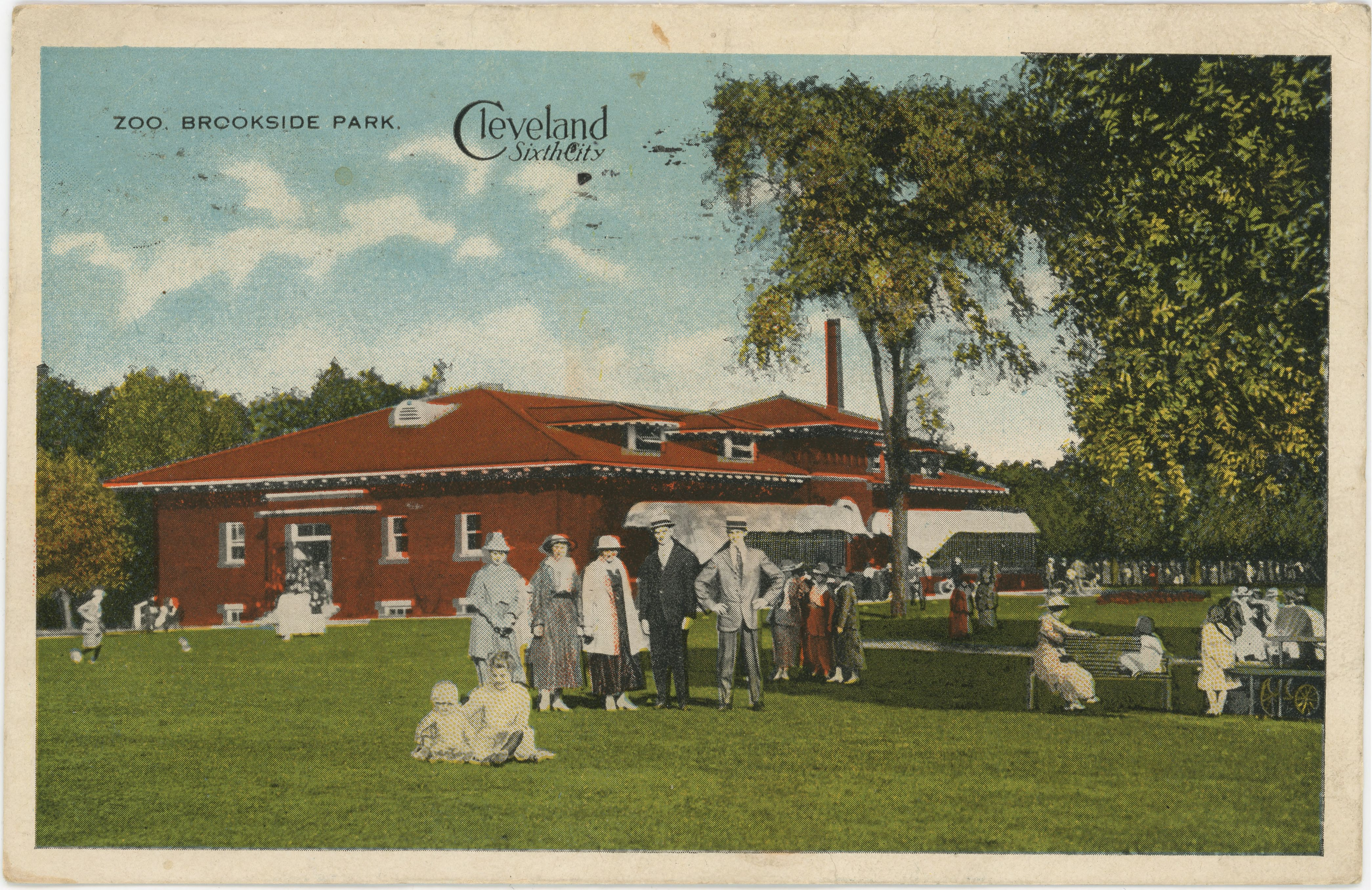
Zoo, Brookside Park, 1918

The Zoo, originally named the Cleveland Zoological Park, first opened in 1882 at Wade Park where the Cleveland Museum of Art now stands. During its early years, the Zoo only held animals of local origin. In 1907, the city of Cleveland moved the Zoo to its current location in Old Brooklyn, and the Zoo acquired its first elephant. The park was informally known (and referred to) as Brookside Zoo for many years. Beginning in 1910, the Zoo constructed Monkey Island, sea lion pools, and a moated bear exhibit. By 1940, the Zoo was home to three elephants and its first (permanent) elephant resident since 1924. That same year, the Cleveland Museum of Natural History assumed control of the Zoo.

Between 1955 and the transfer of management to the Cleveland Metroparks in 1975, the Zoo experienced rapid expansion despite setbacks due to flooding: the Zoo's reptile collection and several other buildings were lost when Big Creek overflowed in January 1959. Although the Zoo had recovered by 1962, it would not have another permanent reptile collection until the opening of the RainForest thirty years later. Ostrich races proved popular in 1965 and 1966 and a large public swimming pool sat on the grounds from 1930 until the 1960s.

Construction began on the Primate & Cat Building in 1975 (the Aquatics section would be added in 1985), later followed by the RainForest in 1992, Wolf Wilderness in 1997, Australian Adventure in 2000, and the Sarah Allison Steffee Center for Zoological Medicine in 2004. Newer exhibits include the Asian highlands and Tiger Passage opened in 2017 and 2018, and The Rhino Reserve was completed in 2020.

The Zoo's official website states that it currently has 3,000 animal residents representing more than 600 different species.

=== Development history ===
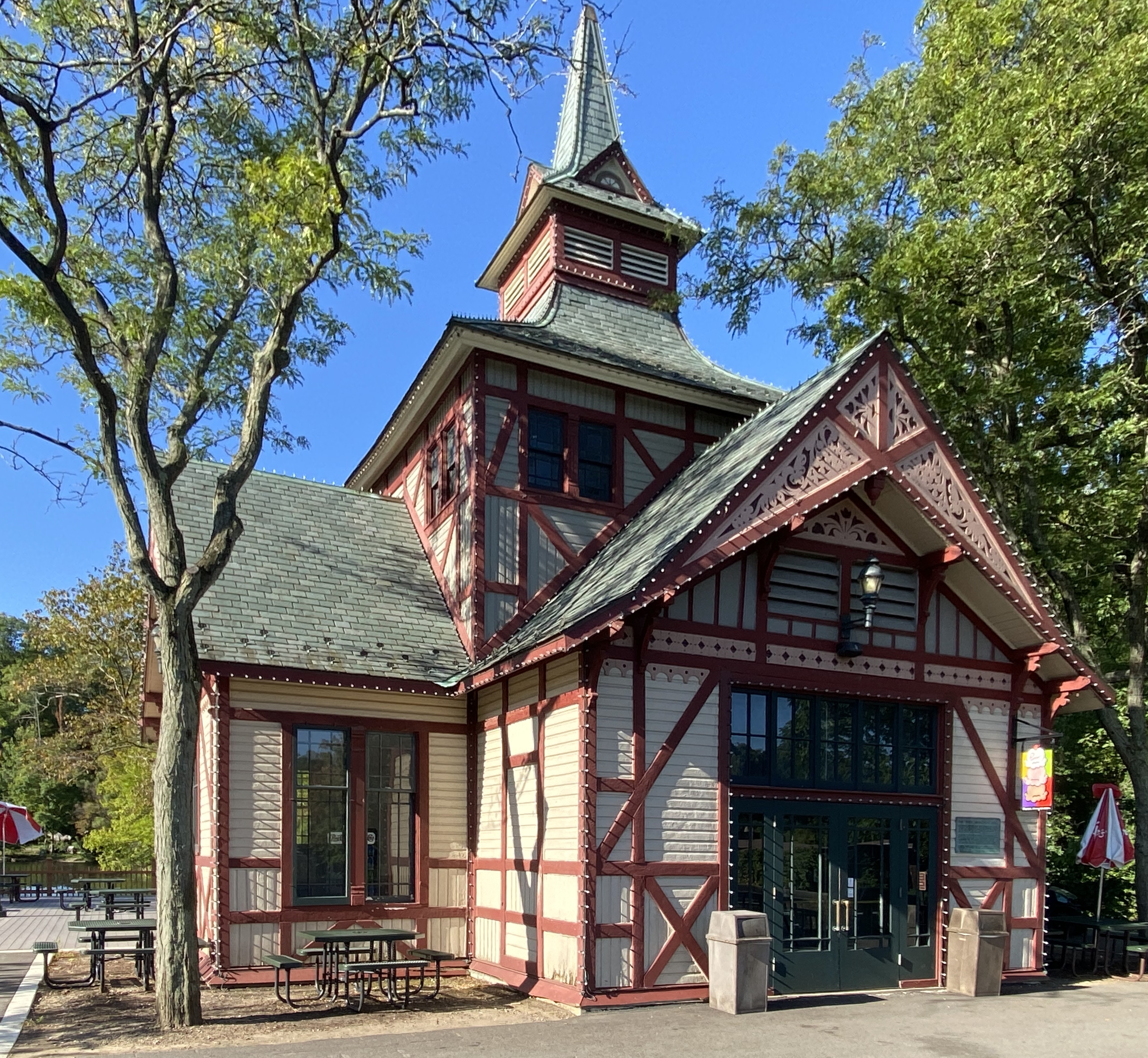
Wade Hall, built in 1884, moved from its original location in University Circle in 1970.

The following is a timeline of the creation of selected buildings, structures, exhibits and attractions:

- 1882: Cleveland Zoological Park opens at Wade Park (now University Circle)
- 1884: Wade Hall is built
- 1907: Cleveland's City Council moves the Zoo to its current location; the Cleveland Museum of Art is built
- 1934: Monkey Island is completed
- 1956: Pachyderm Building is built
- 1970: Wade Hall is moved to its current location on the shore of Waterfowl Lake
- 1975: Construction began on the Primate & Cat Building
- 1985: Aquatics portion of the Primate & Cat Building is added
- 1992: The RainForest is completed
- 1997: Wolf Wilderness is completed
- 2000: Australian Adventure is completed
- 2004: Sarah Allison Steffee Center for Zoological Medicine opens
- 2008: Pachyderm building closes to make room for African Elephant Crossing
- 2011: African Elephant Crossing opens
- 2015: Ben Gogolick Giraffe Encounter opens
- 2016: Rosebrough Tiger Passage opens
- 2018: Asian Highlands opens
- 2019: Monkey Island is demolished to make way for Rhino Reserve
- 2020: Rhino Reserve opens
- 2021: Eagle Zip Adventure opens
- 2023: Susie's Bear Hollow opens
- 2024: The RainForest closes to make way for Primate Forest.

=== Emeritus directors and staff ===
Leonard Goss (1913–1999) was a veterinary pathologist and retired from the Cleveland Zoo (later renamed the Cleveland Metroparks Zoo) as its director in 1979. Goss conducted clinical, epidemiological and pathological research in collaboration with eminent field zoologist George Schaller.

Inspired by the TV show Zoorama, zoo director-emeritus Steve H. Taylor, began his zoo career in 1972 as an animal keeper at the Los Angeles Zoo. According to his website, he is now a "Zoo Consultant and Entertaining Speaker". Taylor resigned as director of the 5-hectare (12-acre) zoo in Sacramento to accept the directorship of the 70-hectare (170-acre) zoo in Cleveland. In his memoirs, published in a newsletter, Taylor described the CMZ to be poorly managed and "undistinguished" when he assumed the position as its 9th director. He credits himself for improving the conditions for both animals and staff over his 24-year career in Cleveland.

Dan Moreno joined the CMZ after serving three decades at the helm of the Cleveland Aquarium as both its director and curator under the auspices of the Cleveland Museum of Natural History. Until his retirement in 1997, Moreno managed the aquatic animal collections at the Cleveland Zoo under General Curator Don Kuenzer. He supervised animal husbandry programs for the Rainforest and Aquatics exhibits.

Don Kuenzer retired after a 40-year career serving in multiple capacities, including senior curator, general curator and acting director. In 1961, Kuenzer began his career at the Cleveland Zoo's Petting Farm as an attendant animal care technician. After serving as an animal keeper, he was promoted to Assistant General Curator in 1975 by zoo director Goss. Kuenzer was credited with designing The Rainforest, a state-of-the art indoor naturalistic living exhibit dedicated to the display of tropical and subtropical species from multiple continents.

== Exhibits ==
Map of the current Cleveland Metroparks Zoo

The Cleveland Metroparks Zoo (CMZ) is divided into several bio-thematic areas that house animals from different regions of the world. Each area is themed for the particular region of the world they represent, although the older areas (such as the Primate, Cat & Aquatics Building) are less thematic than those that were constructed more recently. Upon entering, visitors arrive in the Welcome Plaza which features administrative buildings, an amphitheater, food court, and the Zoo's largest souvenir shop. Numerous smaller concession/souvenir stands are located throughout the park.

Aside from walking, Zoo patrons may opt to ride the "ZooTram" line which shuttles visitors between the Welcome Plaza (near African Elephant Crossing) and the Primate, Cat & Aquatics Building.

=== The RainForest ===
The RainForest, opened in 1992, is one of the most popular exhibits at the CMZ. It is contained in a large, two-story building with over 2 acres (8,100 m^{2}) of floor space, making it one of the largest indoor tropical environments in the world. The RainForest boasts more than 10,000 plants, and over 600 animals, from the tropical regions of Australasia, Africa, and the Americas. The opening of the RainForest also introduced the Metroparks Zoo's first permanent reptile collection since the flooding in 1959. The RainForest's herpetile collection includes Amazon milk frogs and tree boas, Baron's green racers, Burmese pythons, climbing toads, dwarf crocodiles, Fiji banded iguanas, green-and-black, blue-and-black and 'Mint Terribilis' poison dart frogs, green tree monitors and pythons, harlequin frogs, Indian gharial, Indochinese box turtles, Madagascar leaf-tailed geckos, magnificent tree frogs, spider tortoise, Panamanian golden frogs, prehensile-tailed skinks, the aquatic tentacled snake, tiger ratsnakes, tomato frogs and Yemeni veiled chameleons.

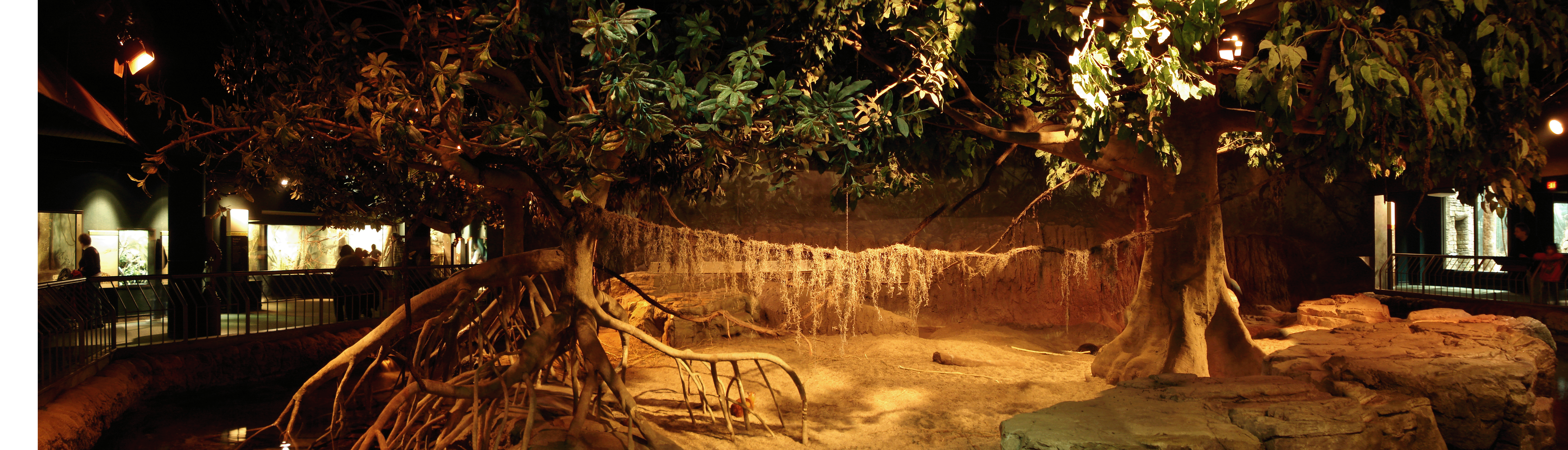
Tropical Rain Storm exhibit located in the RainForest

The RainForest is housed in a large glass and granite building, just outside the main entrance to the Zoo. The structure is divided into an outer ring—featuring an assortment of tropical plants, exhibits containing small mammals, a cafeteria, and a gift shop—and an inner area that contains the principal animal exhibits. Animal habitats are located on both floors of the RainForest. The exhibits contained on the ground floor are collectively known as the "Lower Forest", and those on the second floor are known as the "Upper Forest".

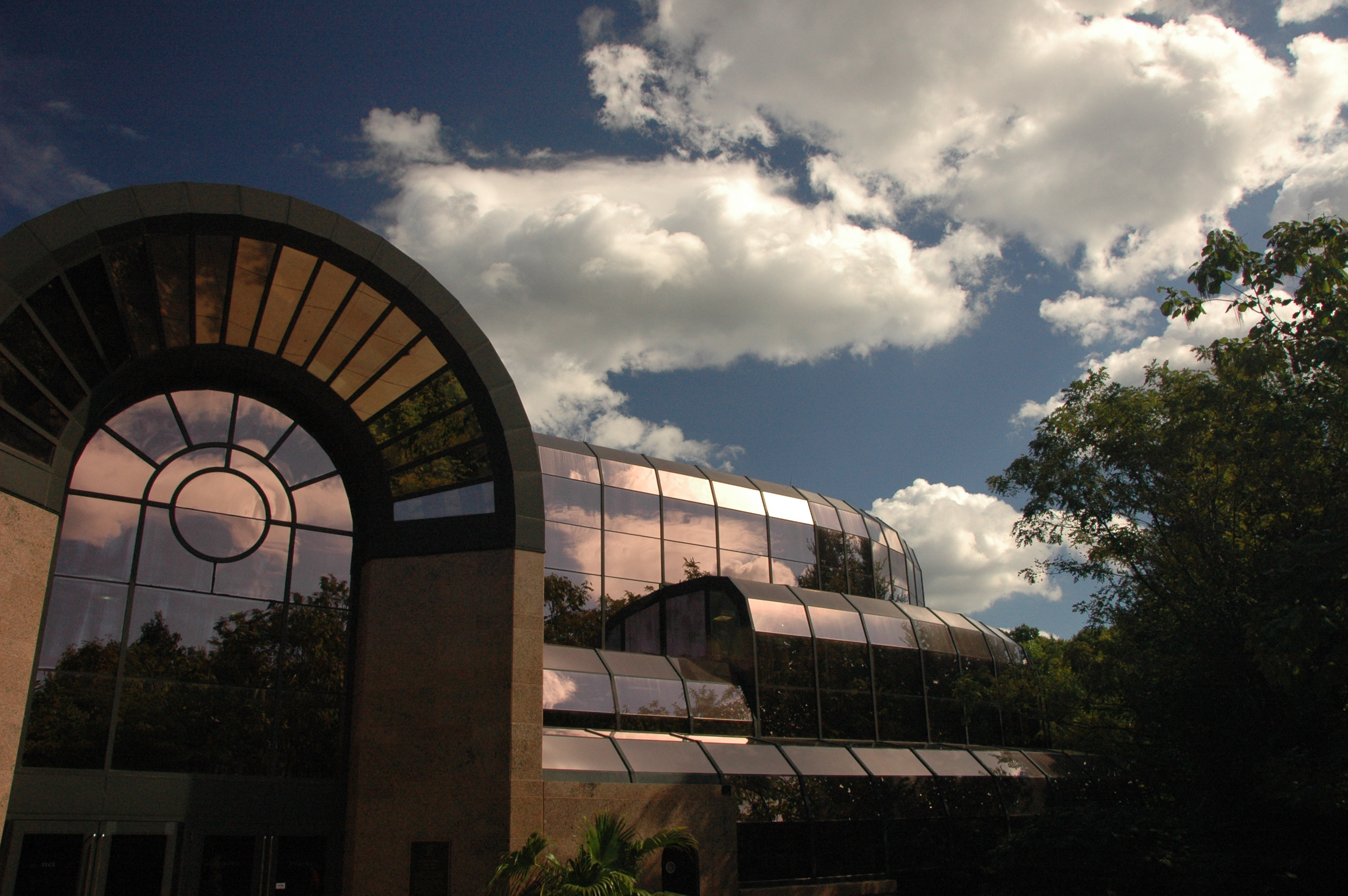
RainForest building exterior

Upon entering the RainForest, visitors are immediately greeted by a cascading, 25-foot (7.6 m) waterfall and a rush of hot, humid air, as the entire complex is heated year-round to an ambient 80 °F (27 °C). All around the waterfall is a lush, tropical garden of epiphyte and lithophyte plants, growing vertically, rooted to the different trees and rock wall; botanical species here include various types of bromeliads, aroids, and orchids. The entire garden display grows steadily towards the sun, soaring upwards of two stories. The walls behind the waterfall resemble Ancient Mayan temple ruins; as visitors walk around the water feature, exhibited creatively within the walls are a series of (geographically appropriate) diminutive New World monkeys, including the pied tamarin, Geoffroy's tamarin, white-headed marmoset and the endangered golden lion tamarin.

The outer ring of The RainForest is home to a wide variety of tropical plants including lancepods, ficus, Dracaena, philodendron, prayer plants, Clusia (or balsam apple), Indian-almond, bixa/achiote (or lipstick trees), numerous varieties of orchids, a kapok tree (Malvaceae family), and the annual-blooming Titan arum (corpse flower). The central "Tropical Rain Storm" exhibit is a life-like recreation of a rainforest "island", with a large tree in the center, surrounded almost entirely by a moat stocked with tinfoil barb and pangasius catfish. The island itself is inhabited by several Cape porcupine. Several times daily (seasonally-dependent), a simulated tropical thunderstorm occurs; darkened ambience, flashing "lightning" and rumbling thunder sound effects signal the several-minutes-long event's commencement. Above the moat and encircling the island, a vertical "wall" of water provides visitors a glimpse of a tropical downpour, with water streaming down into the river below. After the "storm" passes, a sense of tranquility is created as fog fills the entire exhibit.

The core animals of The Rainforest are the Bornean orangutans, of which the zoo has five: males Tiram and Zaki, and females Kera Wak, Kayla, and Merah. Zaki is the most recent orangutan baby at the zoo, born in 2021 to Tiram and Kera Wak.

Animals contained in the RainForest include the binturong, red-rumped agouti, a large group of free-flying straw-coloured fruit bats and Rodrigues flying foxes, the giant anteater, a group of capybara, scarlet ibis, the prehensile-tailed Brazilian porcupine, white-faced whistling ducks, green aracari, Prevost's squirrel, leafcutter ants, ocelot, clouded leopard, Luzon bleeding-heart pigeons, roseate spoonbill, yellow-spotted river turtles, Asian small-clawed otter, François' langur, and fishing cats. Additionally, visitors will encounter numerous smaller, "discovery"-type exhibits featuring tropical invertebrates, Australian rainbowfish, upside-down catfish, jewel cichlids, red-bellied piranha, small mammals, and many reptiles and amphibians.

In 2024, CMZ announced that it will permanently close the RainForest on September 9, 2024. The area will be remodeled and expanded to create a new, 140,000 square foot "Primate Forest" that will serve as a multi-story habitat for gorillas and orangutans. The new Primate Forest, which zoo officials described as a "world-class indoor destination", opened on October 22nd, 2026.

=== African Savanna ===
The African Savanna area is located near the park entrance. Visitors can observe African lions, flamingos, giraffes, zebras, bontebok, a variety of African birds, and eastern black rhinos. the African elephant crossing contains elephants and meerkats. On February 7, 2018, a baby rhino, named Lulu, was born to parents Forrest and Kibbibi. On August 20 of the same year, another baby rhino, named Nia, was born to parents Forrest and Inge.

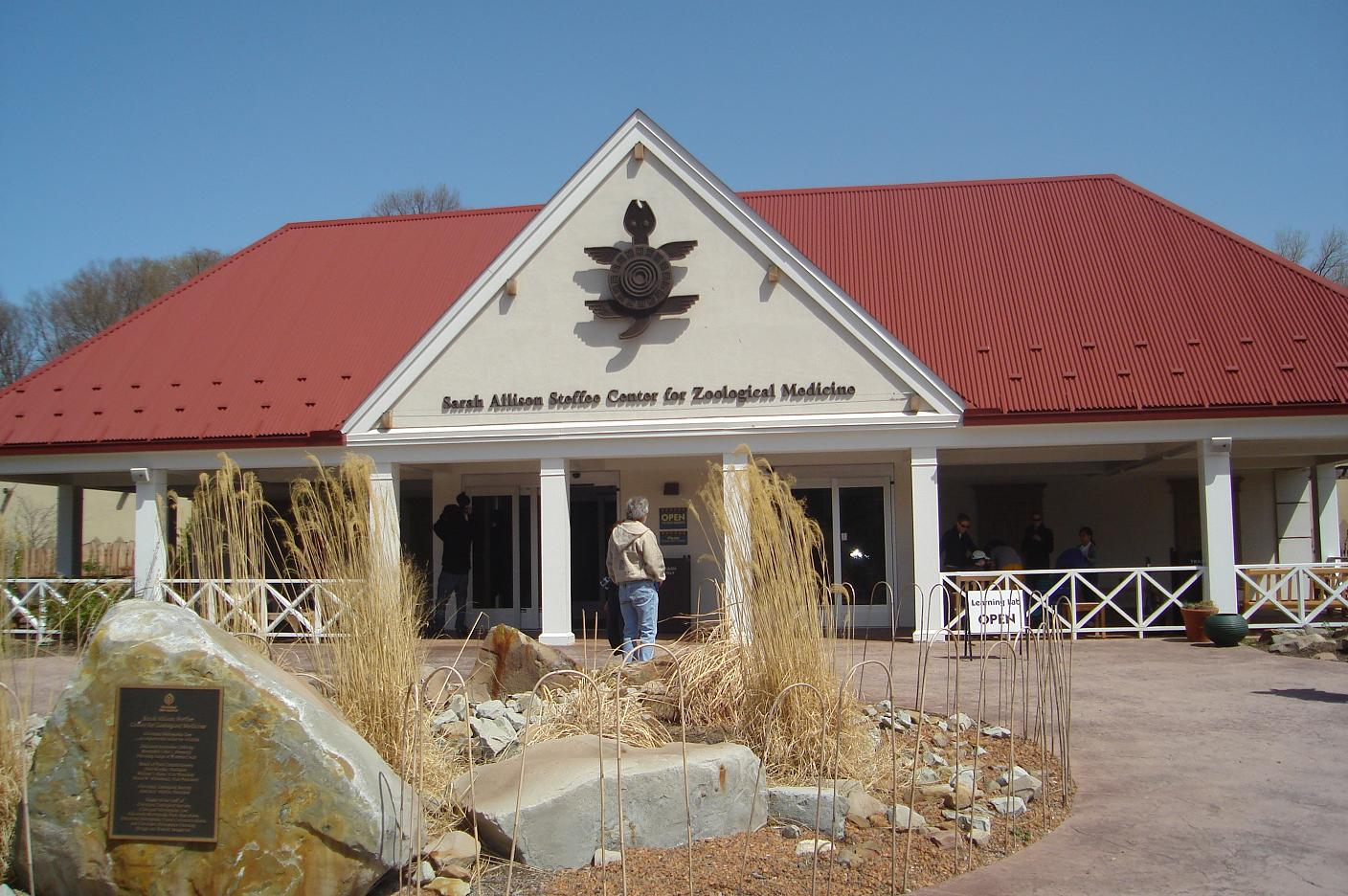
Sarah Allison Steffee Center for Zoological Medicine

==== The Sarah Allison Steffee Center for Zoological Medicine ====
As part of CMZ's focus on conservation, the Zoo constructed the Steffee Center for Zoological Medicine in September 2004. The center hosts medical, laboratory and surgical suites, in addition to a ward and quarantine area. Its veterinary hospital is equipped with the first CT scanner for use in a zoo hospital. Located in a nearby pavilion is the Reinberger Learning Lab, where Zoo patrons can learn about veterinary care at every stage of an animal's life. The Learning Lab offers interactive educational displays as well as views into surgical suites where visitors may observe treatment procedures in progress.

==== African Savanna and Ben Gogolick Giraffe Encounter ====
Consisting of several large yards, the African Savanna features a variety of mammals and birds. The exhibit houses animals such as Masai giraffes, Hartmann's mountain zebras, bonteboks, ostriches, white-backed vultures as well as several species of African storks and geese. In 2015, the Ben Gogolick Giraffe Encounter was completed, and visitors are now able to purchase leaves to feed the giraffes.

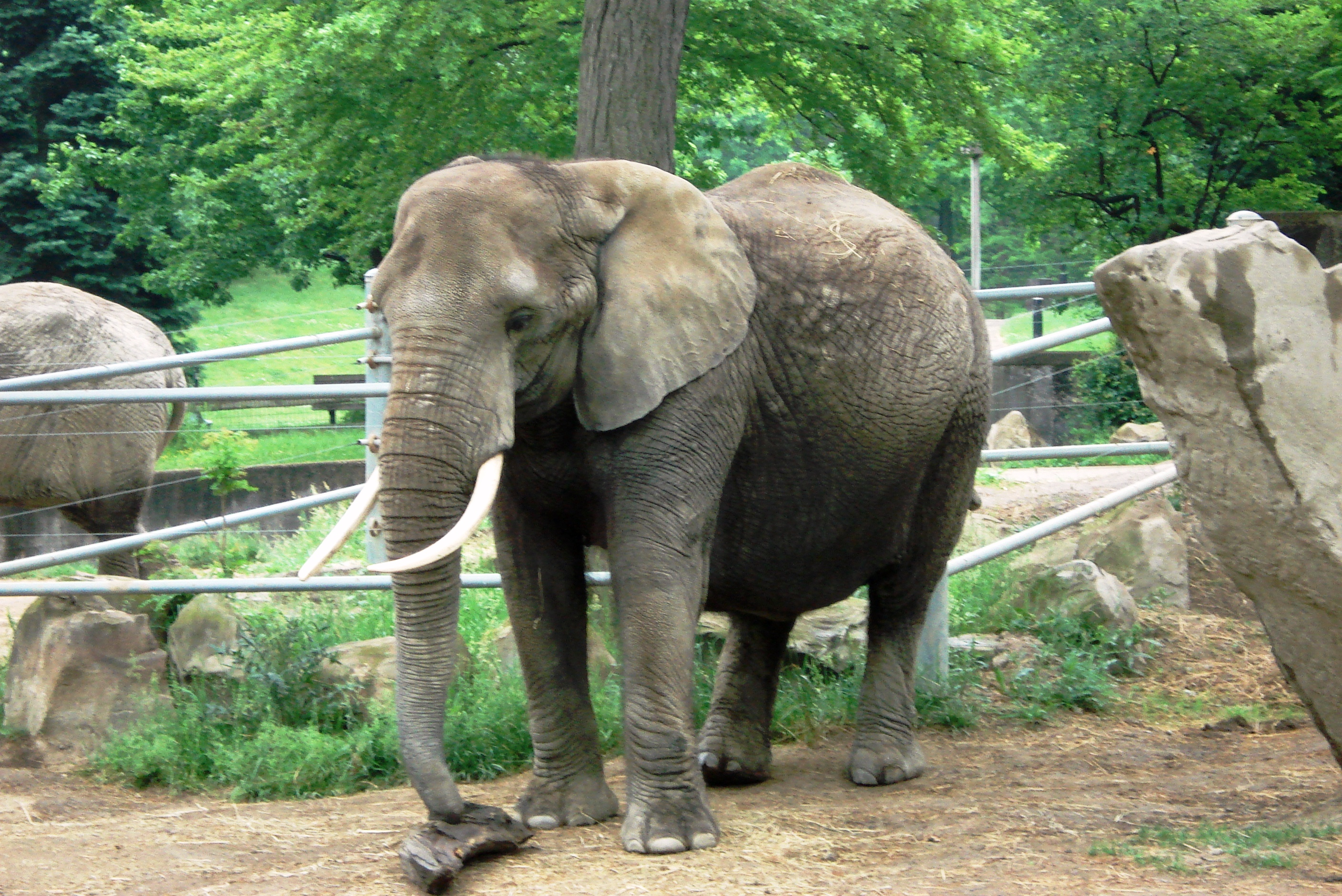
African elephant at the Cleveland Metroparks Zoo

==== African Elephant Crossing ====
In 2011, the Zoo opened its new elephant exhibit, African Elephant Crossing. At a total cost of $25 million, the state of the art habitat quadrupled the elephants' living space, allowing the zoo to increase its number of African elephants from three, to a herd of eight to ten. The exhibit features two large ranges—the Savanna and the Mopani—spread out over several acres. The ranges include deep ponds so that the elephants can swim, as well as expanded sleeping quarters. Areas of the ranges are also heated to maximize the elephants' habitat during the winter months. Periodically throughout the day, the elephants are shepherded across the pathway between the ranges, allowing visitors an up-close view of the animals. In addition to expanding the number of African elephants, the African Elephant Crossing exhibit introduced meerkats, naked mole rats, an African rock python, and several species of birds.

=== Australian Adventure ===
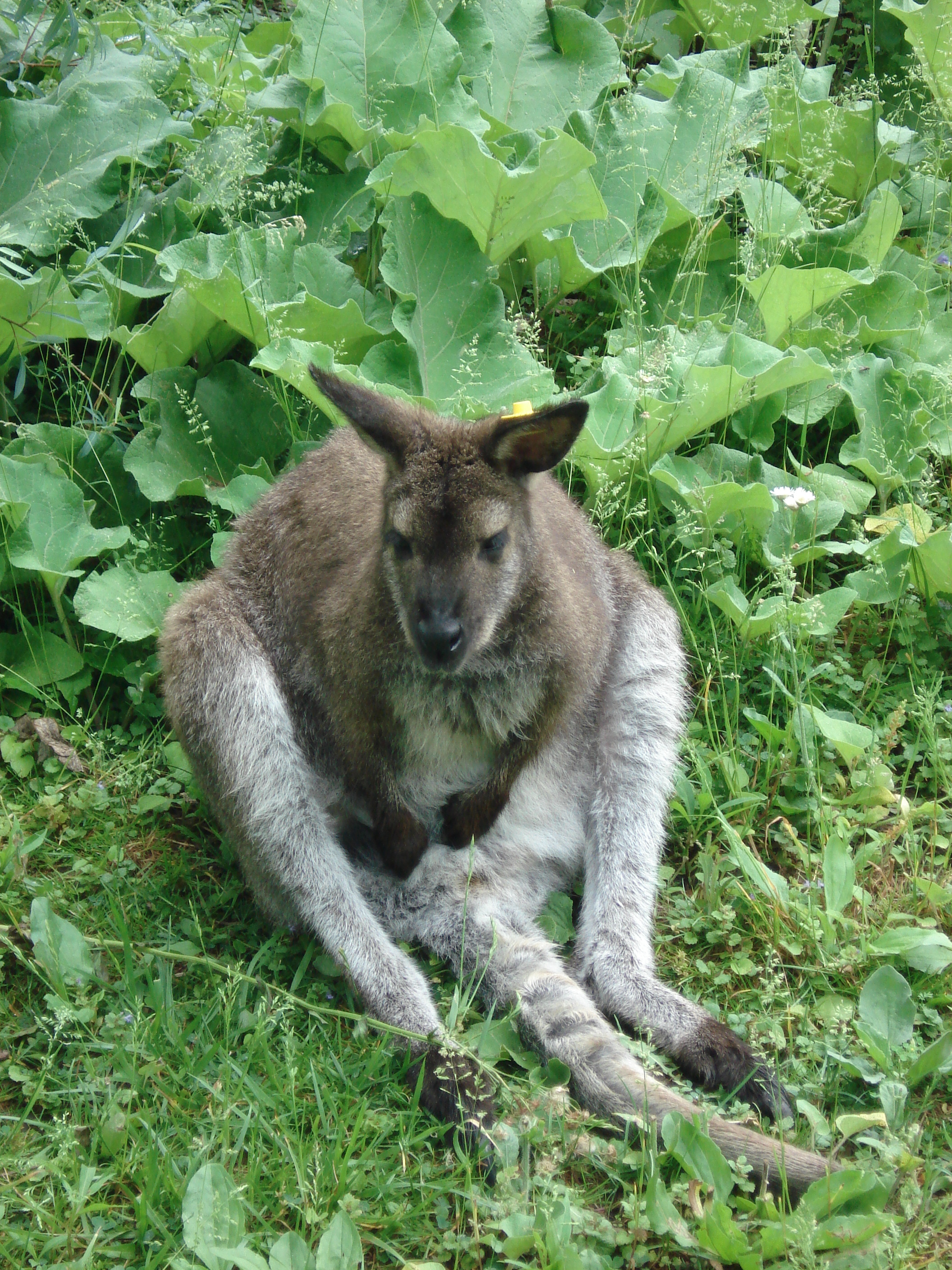
Wallaby found in the Australian Adventure

The Australian Adventure area is an 8-acre (3.2 ha) exhibit designed to resemble the Australian outback. It is home to wallaroos, kangaroos, emus and wallabies that roam freely throughout Wallaby Walkabout. Dingoes are also housed in this area along with two aviaries. During the summer, one contains a kea, and the other has cockatoo and kookaburras. Zoo patrons can learn how sheep are sheared at Kookaburra Station, and experience up-close encounters with Southdown sheep, goats, alpacas and other farm animals in the adjoining Contact Yard. The Australian Adventure is also home to a 55-foot (17 m) Yagga Tree, which contains animal exhibits and a snake slide for younger visitors. Due to Northeast Ohio's inclement winters, Australian Adventure is weather dependent in the colder months.

==== Gum Leaf Hideout ====
Located in Koala Junction, Gum Leaf Hideout is home to the zoo's collection of koalas and Matschie's tree-kangaroos. The exhibit also features interactive displays that teach visitors about the devastating effects of deforestation on Australian ecosystems.

==== Reinberger Homestead ====
Modeled after a traditional 19th-century sheep station, the Reinberger Homestead offers Zoo visitors a look into Australian home life. The area contains animatronics of a koala and kookaburra, which speak about the culture.

==== Wallaby Walkabout and Boomerang Railway ====
Designed to replicate the Australian outback, Wallaby Walkabout features winding paths that visitors share with kangaroos, Red-necked wallabies, and Common wallaroos during the months of April through October. The landscape includes vegetation intended to be consumed by the animals. Families can also take a train ride through the exhibit. In July 2007, the Zoo fell under scrutiny from PETA after a one-year-old kangaroo was struck and killed by the exhibit's "Boomerang Railway" train. In response, the Zoo quickly dismissed the employee who was operating the train and installed a fence along the tracks to prevent future injuries.

==== Yagga Tree ====
The artificial, 55 foot tall Baobab known as the Yagga Tree is the star of Australian Adventure. It once contained exhibits for small animals, as well as another animatronic, this time a crocodile named Wooly Bill.

=== Wilderness Trek ===
The Wilderness Trek area is home to cold climate animals such as Siberian tigers, grizzly bears, tufted deer, Reindeer, the near threatened American bison, and red-crowned cranes which remain active outdoors year-round. The California sea lion/harbor seal exhibits feature large pools for visitors to observe the animals at play. The Metroparks Zoo also contains one of the largest collections of bear species in North America, including grizzly bears, Andean bears, Malayan sun bears, North American black bears, and sloth bears. On January 14, 2019, a female sloth bear named Shive gave birth to a female cub named Shala. Shala was the first sloth bear cub born at the zoo in 30 years.

==== Wolf Wilderness ====
Wolf Wilderness gives visitors a comprehensive look into the environment and wildlife of a northern temperate forest. Wolf Lodge, which anchors the exhibit, serves as an education and viewing center for gray wolves, beavers, and a variety of wetland species. Wolf Wilderness is one of the principal North American habitats at the CMZ. The exhibit opened in 1997 and consists of the Wolf Lodge, a large woodland enclosure for the wolves, a 65,000-gallon pond, and panoramic viewing rooms.

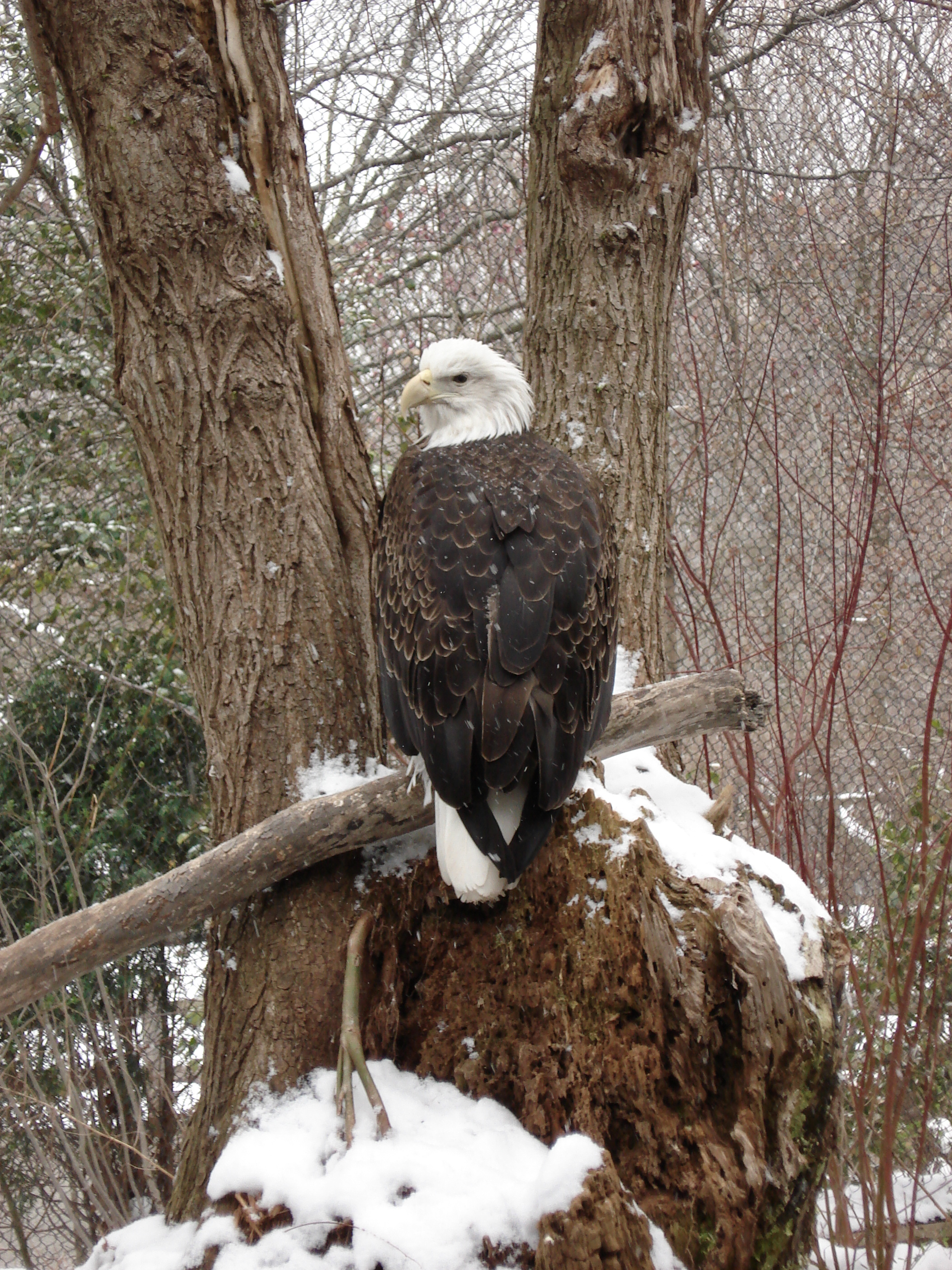
American bald eagle found at Wolf Wilderness

Visitors access the exhibit through the Wolf Lodge, a 3,000-square-foot (280 m^{2}) building that is modeled after a 19th-century fur trading post. Upon entering, visitors arrive in the welcome center, which offers information on the indigenous animals of North America's deciduous forests and wetlands; this room leads into the two main exhibit areas.

The first exhibit room is dedicated to the six Mexican gray wolves contained in a vast, wooded area directly behind the Wolf Lodge. Zoo patrons are able to observe the wolves through a large viewing room with floor-to-ceiling windows, which look out into the habitat. Surveillance cameras within the enclosure are linked to monitors in the viewing room, allowing visitors to see the wolves even when they are out of direct view.

The viewing room leads into the second exhibit area—the wetlands and wolf display room. Here, visitors can observe both the wolves and several other North American animals through floor-to-ceiling windows, similar to the viewing room. Although visitors can also view the wolves from this room, the principal exhibits are the Canadian beaver habitat, the 65,000-US-gallon (250,000 L; 54,000 imp gal) freshwater pond, and the Zoo's collection of bald eagles. The Canadian beaver habitat features an artificial beaver dam with cross-sectional windows that grant visitors a chance to view the beavers' nest within. The freshwater pond is adjacent to the viewing windows, thereby creating an aquarium effect that allows visitors to see what a wetland pond looks like beneath the water's surface. The pond contains numerous fish indigenous to the North American wetlands.

==== Rosebrough Tiger Passage ====
Opened June 3, 2016, this exhibit features "four separate, interconnected habitat areas for the [zoo's] Amur tigers to roam", and includes "two overhead elevated pathways".

==== Asian Highlands ====
Asian Highlands opened June 12, 2018. This exhibit features expanded habitats for snow leopards, Amur leopards, and red pandas, and also includes Sichuan takins. on April 22, 2018, three snow leopard cubs were born.

==== Susie's Bear Hollow ====
Opening on August 23, 2023, this exhibit features the zoo's pair of sloth bears and spectacled bear. The exhibit replaced outdated enclosures built in the 60s with modern habitats for the zoo's tropical bears.

=== Primate, Cat & Aquatics ===
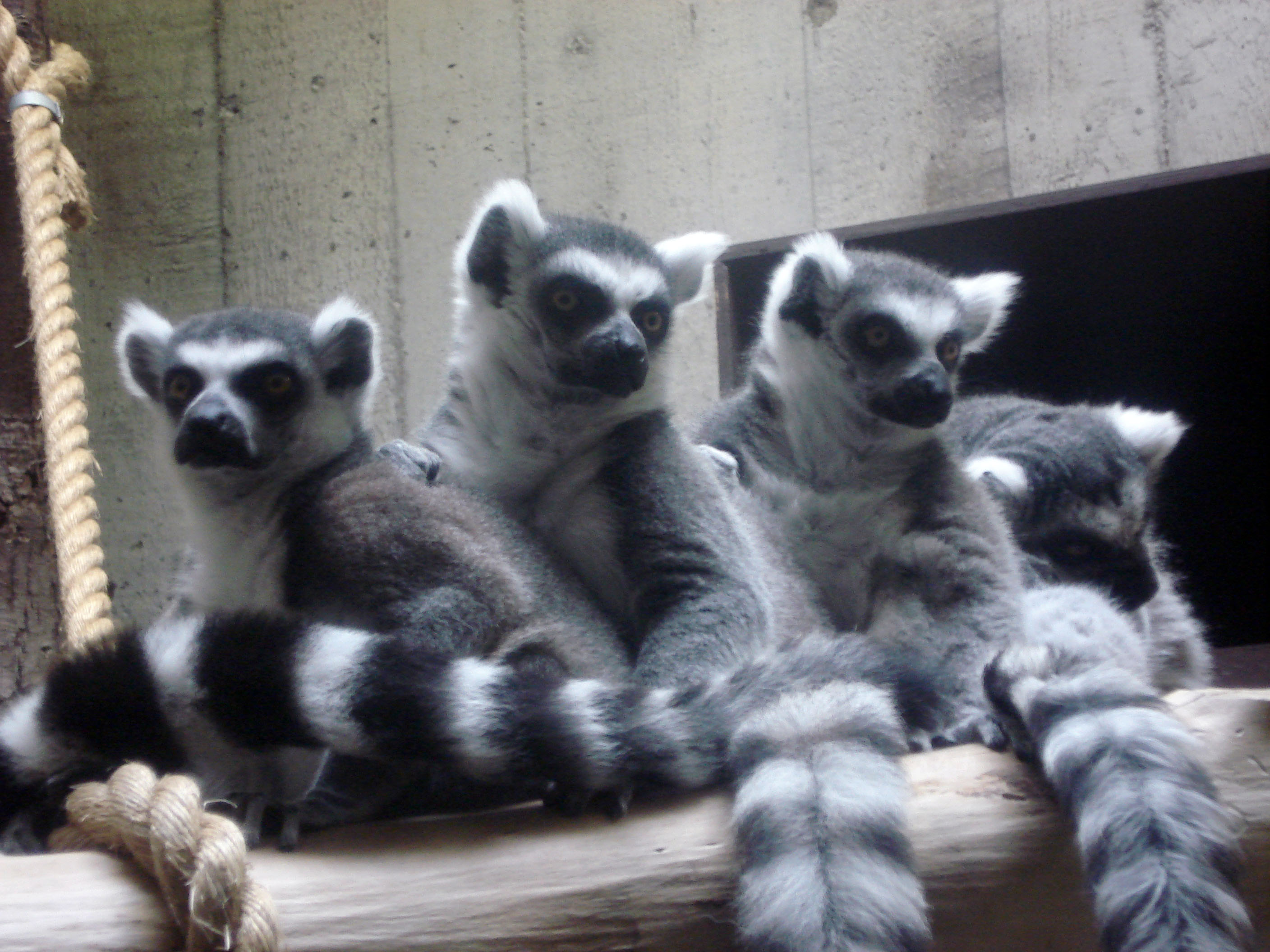
Ring-tailed lemurs at the Cleveland Metroparks Zoo

Opened originally as the Primate & Cat Building in 1975, the Primate, Cat & Aquatics Building houses one of the largest collections of primate species in North America, including western lowland gorillas, Müller's gibbons, Allen's swamp monkeys, golden-bellied mangabeys (one of only twelve zoos currently displaying them), black howler, white-faced sakis, Bolivian gray titis, ring-tailed lemurs, red ruffed lemur, mongoose lemurs and crowned lemurs. Also next to the gorillas is a nocturnal section containing aye-ayes, Mohol bushbabies, and pygmy slow lorises. Non primate species in the primate section include Fossas and Northern treeshrews. However, the building does not display the zoo's entire primate collection with some primates featured in the Rainforest and African Savanna.

In 1985, the Cleveland Aquarium permanently closed and donated its collection of exotic fishes and invertebrates to the Metroparks Zoo. A section of the Primate & Cat building was renovated to accommodate the new Aquatics section, which currently features 35 salt- and freshwater exhibits include Australian lungfishes, a giant Pacific octopus, electric eels, and hundreds of living coral.

The Primate, Cat & Aquatics Building has also featured outdoor exhibits such as the outdoor section of the gorilla and golden bellied mangabey exhibits. The zoo's slowest resident, the Aldabra giant tortoise, can be found in the enclosure directly across from its fastest resident, the cheetah. Several of the tortoises are over one hundred years old.

=== Waterfowl Lake ===
The marshy shallows of Waterfowl Lake are home to Chilean flamingos, black swan, canvasback ducks, and trumpeter swans. During the summer months, Müller's gibbons and lemurs populate the lake's islands, and use ropes suspended above the water to navigate between them. Visitors can observe predatory birds such as Andean condors and Steller's sea eagles in-flight within towering, outdoor flight cages on the lake's eastern shore. The nearby Public Greenhouse contains hundreds of tropical plant species in addition to a seasonal butterfly exhibit. Waterfowl Lake is also the site of Wade Hall, one of the oldest zoo buildings in North America. Today, the hall serves as a Victorian ice cream parlor for Pierre's Ice Cream Company.

== Recognition ==
The CMZ is one of five city zoos in Ohio. The 'Buckeye State' has been referred to as a "Zoo State", as only California rivals Ohio in the sheer number of options zoogoers have for visiting reputable zoos.

A 2014 "Top Ten" ranking of the nation's zoos by USA Today (based on data provided by the Association of Zoos and Aquariums) recognized the CMZ for being nominated for the USA Today award. Three other Ohio zoos were nominated and won awards for the 'Best US Zoo' contest: the Columbus Zoo and Aquarium, the Cincinnati Zoo and Botanical Garden and the Toledo Zoo.

== Notable animals ==
=== Balto ===
Balto, an Alaskan husky and sled dog made famous for his role leading the last stage of the 1925 serum run to Nome, resided at the zoo from March 1927 until his death in March 1933. Balto, along with six surviving teammates from the serum run, were purchased from a traveling circus owner in Los Angeles by the citizenry of Cleveland following a ten-day fundraising campaign. Following his death, Balto's remains were mounted by the Cleveland Museum of Natural History, which continues to exhibit him to this day. Statues of Balto and Togo, another dog credited for heroic feats on the serum run, were unveiled at the zoo in 1997.

=== Timmy (Gorilla) ===
Arguably the most famous animal resident in the Cleveland Metropark Zoo's history, Timmy the Western lowland gorilla attained greater fame as a very prolific sire at the Bronx Zoo. Although he was known as the "dud stud" at the Cleveland zoo, he proved to be quite virile after he arrived at the Bronx Zoo on loan. Timmy was managed indoors in human care for 25 years before being sent on breeding loan to the Wildlife Conservation Society's main campus and headquarters at the Bronx Zoo. The move was highly controversial. The consideration of separating Timmy from his companion Kate, was met with much protest by animal rights activists and was the subject of a federal court case. CMZ Director Emeritus Steve H. Taylor cites the lawsuit surrounding the breeding loan as one of the most significant in the history of modern zoos.

Timmy went on to sire more than 13 offspring in New York, many of whom were conceived in the Bronx Zoo's state-of-the-art Congo Gorilla Forest exhibit, which opened after his arrival in New York City.

Timmy's offspring Okpara was born to Pattycake at the Bronx Zoo. Okpara returned to Cleveland before moving on to another facility.

=== Blackie ===
On January 13, 2014, the CMZ's Nile hippopotamus "Blackie", was euthanized at approximately 60 years of age. He was born in the wild in 1953, then moved to Germany temporarily before moving to Cleveland where he lived at the zoo's Pachyderm Building from 1955 until 2008. For the remaining years of his life, he lived at the zoo's private Africa barn in a two-room enclosure. At the time of his death, Blackie was believed to have been the longest-lived male Nile hippopotamus ever recorded in human care in North America, though this age has since been surpassed by a hippo at the Homosassa Springs Wildlife State Park. As far as hippos go, he had a gentle demeanor and weighed approximately 3700 lbs.

=== Aldabra Tortoises ===
The Zoo cares for three tortoises, including a pair of animals both exceeding 100 years of age.

== Services and special events ==
=== Education and outreach ===
Cleveland Metroparks Zoo (CMZ) hosts day and overnight camps for children ages 5 to 14 during the summer months. The Summer Day Camp program teaches children about conservation and encourages understanding of the natural world. Overnight opportunities include stays in the Australian Adventure's Reinberger Homestead; stays in the Wolf Lodge, where guests can use the same tracking technology utilized by field scientists; and the African-themed "Rising Waters Safari Camp". Campers at Rising Waters stay in the zoo's African Savanna for an authentic safari experience complete with animal encounters. Each overnight program combines elements of Australian, Native American and African culture with an overarching theme of conservation.

Other educational opportunities include the Zoo's "Keeper for a Day" program, which is open to middle school, high school, and college students who are interested in a career working with animals. Similar to a job shadowing program, program participants spend a day working with animal professionals in the Zoo's Conservation Education Division. Participants are tasked with preparing meals, cleaning enclosures, conducting training exercises, and providing animals with enrichment items to stimulate them both mentally and physically.

The CMZ is a part of Miami University's graduate-level Advanced Inquiry Program (AIP). The program offers a Master of Arts in Biology or Master of Arts in Teaching through online coursework and face-to-face experiential learning experiences at the zoo.

=== Conservation support ===
The zoo also offers numerous grant opportunities which fund research and conservation projects around the world. In 2011, the zoo and Zoological Society awarded grants to more than 90 field conservation projects and programs in 39 countries. Some of these projects include elephant conservation in southern Africa, studying gorilla ecology and behavior in central Africa, and anti-poaching initiatives for Asiatic freshwater turtles. Over the past ten years, the CMZ has supported more than 600 conservation projects in nearly 100 countries. Current initiatives include "Quarters for Conservation" and spreading awareness of the burgeoning Palm Oil Crisis in Malaysia and Indonesia.

=== Events ===
==== Boo at the Zoo ====
CMZ's annual fall event, "Boo at the Zoo", takes place in October. Visitors can observe the various cold weather animals that still roam outside, and are encouraged to wear costumes to the park. The Boo at the Zoo event is a safe Halloween option that offers animal shows, live performances, and other fall-related activities.

==== DINOSAURS! ====
During the summer months, the Zoo features prehistoric animals along the wooded path around Waterfowl Lake. Younger visitors have the opportunity to dig for "fossils" and learn about the field of paleontology. The 2007 and 2010 "DINOSAURS!" exhibits showcased dinosaurs from around the world: Tyrannosaurus rex, Stegosaurus, Triceratops, Pteranodon, Omeisaurus, Dilophosaurus, Baryonyx, Iguanodon, Styracosaurus, Apatosaurus, Kentrosaurus, Brachiosaurus, Suchomimus and more. The 2013 "DINOSAURS!" exhibit featured 20 animatronic prehistoric creatures, including Quetzalcoatlus and Troodon.

=== Venue hire ===
In Spring 2015, the CMZ opened a new reception event center, Stillwater Place. Offering scenic views of nearby Waterfowl Lake and a capacity of up to 300 guests, Stillwater Place is open year-round and caters to many occasions, such as weddings, birthdays, reunions and more.

== Incidents ==
In 1938, Judy Zemnick, a young artist with the Works Progress Administration (WPA), was pulled into an enclosure by a polar bear named "Silver" and "badly mangled", according to news reports. Two other WPA artists, James C. Kulhanek and Clarence Zuelch, witnessed the attack, called for help, and attempted to drive the bear away from Zemnick. Zoo visitors were known to throw things, including broken glass, at "Silver" for several years in retaliation for the incident. In October 1940, an anonymous "10-year-old girl" sent $2.00 ("her savings") to the zoo "protesting the throwing of bottles and stones at the bear." She specified one dollar was to be given to the zoo staff members who "are good to animals" with the other donated for "a new place for the zoo."

In 2015, Mitchelle Schwab was charged after allegedly dropping her 2-year-old son into a cheetah exhibit. His parents were finally able to retrieve him from the exhibit and was taken to MetroHealth Medical Center.
