= Judy Zemnick =

Judy M. Zemnick (July 12, 1917 – December 22, 2007) was an American artist. In 1938 when she was 21 she was painting a polar bear at the Brookside Zoo in Cleveland, Ohio, when it attacked and mauled her causing severe injuries.

She made several sculptures related to the transportation history of Cleveland. The General Services Administration has three of her paintings. She had a sister and a brother.
