= Timmy (gorilla) =

Western lowland gorilla

- Species: western lowland gorilla (Gorilla gorilla gorilla)
- Sex: Male
- Born: 1959 (approximate --born in the wild) in Yaounde, Republic of Cameroon (placed in human care at Memphis Zoo (1960–1966), moved to Cleveland Metroparks Zoo (1966–1991), moved on breeding loan to Bronx Zoo (1991–2004), retired and euthanized because of deteriorating health at Louisville Zoo (2004–2011))
- Died: August 2, 2011 (aged 51–52)

Timmy (1959 – August 2, 2011) was a western lowland gorilla (Gorilla gorilla gorilla) and a 25-year-long resident of the Cleveland Metroparks Zoo. He was primarily housed indoors at the Zoo's Primate, Cat & Aquatics building. The even-tempered silverback gorilla was euthanized at the Louisville Zoo after suffering from chronic cardiovascular disease and osteoarthritis in 2011.

== Oldest male gorilla in North America in 2011 ==
At the time of his death at age 52, Timmy was the oldest male gorilla in North America. During his later adult life he sired more than 12 offspring, which were conceived of and born while he was on breeding loan at the Wildlife Conservation Society's Bronx Zoo campus. Progeny include offspring Timmy sire with Pattycake (gorilla) who was born at the Central Park Zoo and was the first gorilla born in New York. He was also introduced to three other reproductively active females. His mate in Cleveland of 19 months, "Kribe Kate", and for whom he showed interest, affection and social compatibility with was determined to be infertile.

Prior to Kate, Timmy showed both indifference and fear of prospective mates including Emmy who arrived from another Ohio Zoo and died from a blood disorder. Timmy and Yogi, who was also wild born had to be separated according to then General Curator Don Kuenzer.

== Federal lawsuit filed by multiple animal rights organizations ==
Timmy's move was highly controversial and nearly blocked by animal rights activists in Cleveland, represented by prominent civil rights attorney Avery Friedman, and from around the world. Several activist organizations hired an attorney who ultimately filed a lawsuit in front of US district court, citing the separation of Timmy and his female companion (imposed by zoo and zoo association officials), was an inhumane and detrimental to the gorillas' psychological welfare act.

According to an article published by international news agency United Press International, "Timmy's keepers [in Cleveland] said they are afraid the separation from Kribe Kate, who is known as Katie, could harm or even kill Timmy and that the move to New York in a cage in the rear of a truck could also traumatize him. At the least, they fear the move might cause Timmy to revert to being introverted and antisocial."

== From a "Dud" in Cleveland to a "Stud" in New York City ==
Timmy was born in the wild in Yaounde, Republic of Cameroon in 1960. He was captured along with eight other lowland gorillas by Dr. Deets Pickett, a Kansas City and Cameroon-based veterinarian turned ape capture expert. Pickett, referred to as the "gorilla hunter", pursued the lucrative venture of capturing gorillas for zoos but was also instrumental in learning how to keep orphaned and other infant chimpanzees and gorillas alive in transport and in extended or permanent human care. He contributed to advancements in great ape husbandry science and preventive medicine and specifically sedation/chemical restraint with narcotics, as well as transport and extended care in captivity.

=== Interview with "Gorilla Hunter" Dr. Deets Pickett ===
In a July 3, 1964 radio interview with Dan Price (CBC Digital Archives), Pickett conceded that at the time of Timmy's capture 97% of gorillas died before leaving Africa. Most succumbed to communicable diseases contracted from humans. But among the eight gorillas transported, Timmy was one of the few to survive and was sold to the Memphis Zoo for five thousand dollars. Today a gorilla is "valued" at least US$100,000 Back when 1981 when Timmy was obtained for exhibition and conservation breeding purposes then-Cleveland Zoo Director Michael Vitantonio said to acquire a gorilla from the wild about to be introduced to a prospective mate from the Columbus Zoo could cost as much 100,000 to 120,000 dollars.

=== In residence at the Wildlife Conservation Society's Bronx Zoo (WCS Headquarters) ===
In 1999, the Wildlife Conservation Society opened the Congo Gorilla Forest exhibit at its Bronx Zoo campus and headquarters. The exhibit, which is a 6.5-acre enclosure, provides home to approximately 20 gorillas. The two Bronx Zoo gorilla families, including Timmy's, were among the largest breeding groups of western lowland gorillas in North America.

Timmy actually proved to be a bigger star in New York City than he was in Cleveland. The celebrity silverback sired more than twelve offspring while in residence at the Bronx Zoo, including progeny with Pattycake (gorilla), the first gorilla born successfully in human care in New York. Pattycake was actually born at the Wildlife Conservation Society's Central Park Zoo campus and later moved to the Bronx Zoo.

A 1994 New York Times article described a "gorilla baby boom" and plans the gorilla care and management program: "[The Zoo's] first objective is to increase the genetic diversity of an endangered species, but a second, related goal is to create happier gorillas by finding mates and establishing compatible groups. "These are very intelligent, sensitive animals," said James Doherty, curator of the Bronx Zoo.".

=== In Residence at the Louisville Zoo ===
In 2004, Timmy was retired to another state-of-the art facility at the Louisville Zoo's Gorilla Forest Exhibit

== See also ==
- List of individual apes
