= Emil Dolensek =

American veterinarian (1941–1990)

Emil P. Dolensek (1941 – 1990) was an American veterinarian. He was Chief Veterinarian for the New York Zoological Society (now the Wildlife Conservation Society) from 1969 to 1990.

== Early life and education ==
Dolensek was born in 1941, in Traverse City, Michigan, and graduated in 1967 from Michigan State University College of Veterinary Medicine. He worked in private practice in Connecticut until he joined the staff of the New York Zoological Society as one of a handful of full-time zoo veterinarians in America (there are now more than 600). In addition to caring for animals at the Bronx Zoo, he also cared for animals at the New York Aquarium in Coney Island and, after 1981 when the NYZS took over management of the New York City zoos, he was responsible for the health of the animals at the Central Park, Prospect Park, and Queens Zoos. Dolensek was awarded the centennial gold medal of the New York State Veterinary Medical Society for his contributions in the field and was a past president of the American Association of Zoo Veterinarians.

== Contributions ==
During his tenure, Dolensek was responsible for establishing a pathology department with a full-time veterinary pathologist responsible for creating and maintaining health and pathology records for each animal in the collections; developing techniques for anesthetizing wild animals; establishing a nutrition department to research and implement appropriate nutritional programs; and instituting methods for controlling parasites. He also designed and oversaw the construction of the first in a new generation of zoo animal hospitals with comprehensive medical, surgical, and pathology capabilities. He performed ground-breaking surgeries (including the first caesarean section on a lowland gorilla) and helped to discover the role of Vitamin E deficiency in animals as it relates to the prevention of diseases. He established a field veterinary program for veterinarians to work with research scientists in the wild. Dolensek himself traveled to several countries, most notably China, where he worked with George Schaller who was studying giant pandas and helped develop a breeding center for them; and to the Congo, where he worked with Drs. Terese and John Hart on okapi conservation.

== Book ==
Dolensek was the subject of an award-winning book by Bruce Buchenholz entitled Doctor in the Zoo, published in 1974; the book was also published in England and translated into German, French, and Japanese. Dolensek was himself the author of many significant papers, as well as popular articles, and a book, A Practical Guide to Impractical Pets, which he wrote with his wife Barbara Burn and illustrated with photographs by Buchenholz.

After his death, the American Association of Zoo Veterinarians established the Emil Dolensek Award, "an honor presented to a past or present member of the AAZV in appreciation for exceptional contributions to the conservation, care, and understanding of zoo and free-ranging wildlife reflecting Emil Dolensek's commitment to these purposes. Emil was in the prime of his life and his career, and this award recognizes similar individuals that have advanced the profession and served to link the related disciplines of zoo and wildlife medicine."
