= United States environmental and occupational health in zoos =

In the United States, there are environmental and occupational health hazards in zoological parks. The risks associated with working with and caring for the animals, include visitor employee safety. There are numerous safeguards in place to prevent injury, disease, and death.

== Employee safety ==
Zookeeper or zoo workers are labeled dangerous job positions. Limited regulations regarding the safety of zoo workers exist.

The Occupational Safety and Health Administration (OSHA) is a federal agency responsible for setting and monitoring workplace health and safety regulations. OSHA does not designate a specific section of standards and regulations for zoo workers. Requirements for zoos fall under OSHA's general regulations for maintaining a safe and healthy work environment.

The Association for Zoos and Aquariums (AZA) is a private nonprofit organization offering accreditation to institutions that apply and meet their very high standards. While the majority of standards focus on the health and safety of animals, standards pertaining to worker safety are included.

The zoo itself and their governing authority are ultimately responsible for creating their own safety policies and procedures. The policies must fall within broad federal regulations. Zoos employ safety officers responsible for developing, implementing, and evaluating safety and training policies.

Zoo keepers are in charge of cleaning, feeding, and care of animals. These activities present a level of risk. Personal protective equipment (PPE) is essential in these tasks. Examples of PPE used by zoo workers are masks, gloves, boots, goggles, and communication devices. Techniques and specialized equipment also contribute to zoo worker safety. Modified sliding doors and guillotine doors aid in feeding large or dangerous animals. Shifting, a technique commonly used for feeding and cleaning the enclosure, requires directing the animal to a securable section of their habitat. This technique protects the worker as well as prevents disruption of the cleaning process. When needing to transport or care for animals, basic capture and restraint equipment varies by animal. Equipment commonly used includes gloves, nets, blow darts, projectile guns/darts, and crates or cages.

There are other health risks for respiratory- related illness and disease such as asthma and allergies. Also, for those who work with certain species, there is risk of toxicity due to venomous exposure.

Much of the research on these topics is extrapolated from studies on laboratory workers, however there are a few specific studies for zoo employees. Most studies have been in the form of voluntarily questionnaires. Using tools including the skin prick test, a skin allergy test, zoo employees were identified to have allergies or not. In these studies, the researchers took into account confounding variables such as pet presence at home. They also accounted for duration of work with animals. This study determined significant allergic reaction for employees who work with parrots.

Another potential hazard for zoo employees is for those who work with venomous animals. These animals have bites or stings that expose the victim to a toxin. Many of the reptiles in zoos are exotic and poison control centers may not keep the appropriate anti-venom in stock. If anti-venom is unavailable, emergency hospitalization or a fasciotomy may need to be performed.

Other common injuries include needlestick injuries, radiation exposure from x-rays and animal related injuries such as bites and kicks. Also, there is a risk for chemical exposure due to anesthetic agents, formaldehyde, pesticides, and disinfectants.

Many of these hazards can be minimized using personal protective equipment. Education on proper animal care procedures is essential, including proper handling of chemical and sharps waste.

Zoonotic diseases, otherwise known as zoonosis, are diseases that can be transferred from animals to humans and vice versa. They can be spread through the air, through common animal vectors (such as animals), or through direct contact. Within zoos, the most susceptible group for contracting a zoonotic disease is zoo workers such as veterinarians and zookeepers who have direct contact with the animals. The most commonly known zoonotic diseases are:

- West Nile
- Avian influenza
- Salmonella
- Escherichia coli

Other, less known diseases that can be spread between humans and animals are:

- Tuberculosis
- Human Immunodeficiency Virus (HIV) most often found as retroviruses in animals.

The design and structure of each exhibit limits the exposure of zoonotic diseases to guests and workers by limiting exposure and direct contact to the animals. Using personal protective equipment properly, examining animals on a regular basis and reporting new illnesses and outbreaks to proper authorities (e.g. State Health Department), as well as providing extensive education and training on how to properly handle and care for animals are all important components of limiting zoonotic disease transmission.

== Guest safety ==
Proper enclosure design is the best method to protect zoo patrons from animal exposures. In addition to ensuring animal welfare, exhibits are designed to immerse the viewer in a particular habitat while maintaining a barrier between guests and animals. Enclosures must also reflect species-specific characteristics, such as ability to fly, jump, climb, swim or dig.

Dry moats are built by digging a deep trench around a section or the entirety of the exhibit that is wide enough to prevent an animal from jumping across. Signs and railings are used to prevent guests from climbing into the exhibit or falling into the moat.

Wet moats are similar to dry moats with the exception that they are filled with water and often built to resemble naturally occurring bodies of water such as a river. However, unless the water is circulated and filtered, wet moats have the potential to become habits for mosquitoes and other disease spreading entities.

Glass barriers prevent allergens and zoonotic diseases from passing between the guest and the animal because they restrict the flow of air and provide a physical barrier to objects crossing into or out of the exhibit. However, glass requires cleaning on both sides of the exhibit and might expose staff to diseases or physical hazards unless additional safety measures are taken.

Fences are most often designed so that pressure placed upon them by the animal does not damage the integrity of the fence. The exact type of fencing used depends on the species being housed in the exhibit. “Apron fencing” or fencing that extends underground is used to enclose species that can dig. “Overhang fencing”, or fencing that curves towards the inside of the exhibit at the top is used to enclose species that can jump or climb. A new movement in enclosure design is to disguise safety fences with natural features such as ivy, or to paint them black so they appear invisible when viewed from a distance.

Physical Hazards for Guests at the Zoo: Safety signage is primarily responsible for detouring unsafe behaviors such as standing on barriers and avoiding potential tripping hazards Additionally, the presence of zoo security staff, guest services and zookeepers may help limit potentially hazardous situations for guests.

== Federal regulation ==
The Animal Welfare Act (AWA), which was signed into law August 24, 1966, is the only federal law which regulates the treatment of animals in research, exhibition transport and by dealers. The Act has been amended seven times since (1970, 1976, 1985, 1990, 2002, 2007, 2008) but the most recent amendments have focused on animal rights regarding matters such as farm animals and animal fighting.

It not only regulates the well-being of animals but it also monitors how animals in zoos may be exhibited and treated. Although it provides protection for all animals who meet the criteria defined in the statute, its scope is limited in the number of animals covered.

The AWA provides a minimum acceptable standard of care for the treatment of animals. It also gives authority to the Secretary of Agriculture to enforce the rules and regulations outlined within the law. As well, the United States Department of Agriculture (USDA) and the Animal and Plant Health Inspection Service (APHIS) are charged with enforcing compliance issues for standards of care. The APHIS carries out yearly inspections of zoos and other facilities to monitor and report any issues which arise, while also investigating complaints received from individual facilities.

Despite the presence of a national law governing the treatment of animals, it often falls upon the states to implement more inclusive zoo policies to provide ample care for the animals within their facilities. The AWA has a few limitations; for example, only warm-blooded animals are covered by the definition outlined in the statute. In addition, the APHIS is hindered by a lack of resources for investigating claims; they have only 104 inspectors to monitor over 2,000 facilities nationwide. Also, the AWA lacks a citizen suit provision, which would allow a concerned citizen to sue on behalf of a mistreated animal.

== Major accidents ==
- (June 26, 2012 - Los Angeles Zoo, California) A baby chimpanzee was killed by an adult male chimp in front of visitors.
- (June 21, 2012 - Lake Superior Zoo, Minnesota) Major rainfall caused a nearby creek to overflow, leading to the flooding of several exhibits, animal escapes and drowning and property damage.
- (March, 2010 - Lincoln Park Zoo, Wisconsin) A woman ignored barriers and warning signs and tried to feed two bears. One of the bears bit off her thumb and forefinger and partially severed her middle and ring fingers.
- (October, 2009 - Calgary Zoo, Canada) Two drunken men snuck into the Calgary Zoo during the night. They climbed over a safety fence and entered the tiger cage. One of the men was mauled and severely injured by a Siberian tiger.
- (February, 2007 – Denver Zoo, Colorado) A jaguar attacked and killed a zookeeper who had entered the animal’s enclosure for unknown reasons.
- (December 25, 2007 - San Francisco Zoo) A Siberian tiger, named Tatiana with a history of violent behavior, escaped from its pen and killed a zoo visitor and injured two others. Witnesses stated that visitors were taunting the animal and may have even aided in its escape.
