= Pierre's Ice Cream Company =

American ice cream company

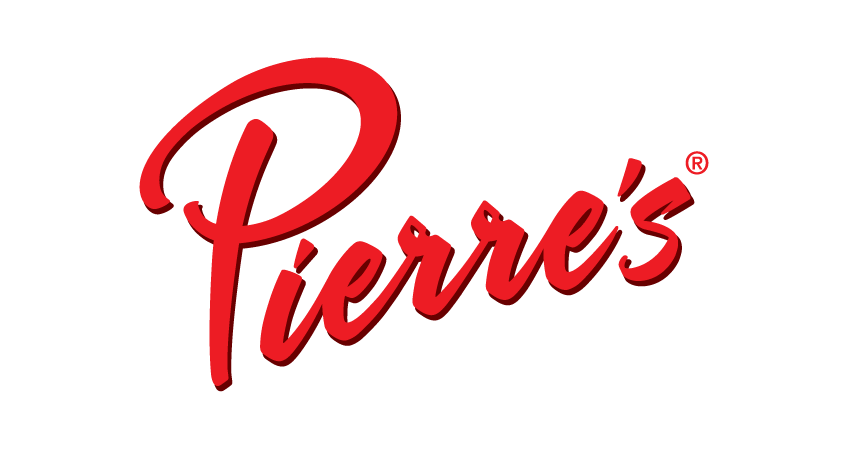
- Company type: Private
- Industry: Foods
- Founded: 1932
- Founder: Alexander "Pierre" Basset
- Headquarters: Cleveland, Ohio, United States
- Key people: Shelley Roth (President & CEO)
- Products: Ice cream Frozen yogurt Sorbet
- Website: www.pierres.com

Pierre's Ice Cream Company is a Cleveland-based ice cream company founded by Alex Basset in 1932.

== History ==
Pierre's Ice Cream Company first opened a store in 1932 at East 82nd Street and Euclid Avenue. Fresh ice creams were prepared each day in the back of the store which were sold by the cone, the cup, or hand packed. The founder of this company is Alexander "Pierre" Basset. As Pierre's expanded, the company moved to St. Clair Avenue, and to the East 60th Street and Hough Avenue in 1960. The Hough Avenue plant was shared with the Royal Ice Cream Company owned by Sol Roth, a small ice cream manufacturer. The Royal Ice Cream Company acquired the Pierre's Ice Cream Company in 1960, and Royal began showcasing the Pierre's brand and special recipe. The Pierre's/Royal acquired the Harwill Ice Cream Company at East 65th Street and Carnegie Avenue in 1967. In April 1995, Pierre's moved into its center and office headquarters at East 65th and Euclid Avenue. In September 2010, the company scheduled to open the state-of-the-art ice cream factory on a 35,000 square foot. In 2011, the company opened a new factory to replace its original plant; the facility cost $9.2 million, $6.2 million of which was supplemented by loans from the city of Cleveland. In 2022, Pierre's Ice Cream Company was acquired by Ohio Processors Inc. for an undisclosed amount.

== Products ==
Pierre's Ice Cream produces 51 flavors of ice cream and 235 products in total; its ice cream is sold in the states of Ohio, Pennsylvania, West Virginia, Kentucky, Louisiana, Michigan, New Jersey, New York, Georgia, Tennessee, Texas, and Virginia as well as Aruba, Bermuda, and Puerto Rico. It also manufactures private label lines distributing many ice cream national brands.
