= Primate research center =

Primate research center may refer to:

== Barbados ==
- The Primate Research Centre at the Barbados Wildlife Reserve, for the conservation and study of Green Monkeys.

== Georgia ==
Russian Institute of Medical Primatology in Sokhumi, Abkhazia, Georgia.

== Japan ==
- Primate Research Institute in Inuyamaat, Japan; affiliated with Kyoto University.

== United States ==
- California National Primate Research Center, at University of California, Davis in Davis, California.
- Minnesota Primate Research in the Preclinical Research Center in the University of Minnesota Medical School in Minneapolis, Minnesota.
- Oregon National Primate Research Center, in Hillsboro, Oregon; affiliated with the Oregon Health and Science University.
- Southwest National Primate Research Center, in San Antonio, Texas, part of the Texas Biomedical Research Institute.
- Tulane National Primate Research Center in Covington, Louisiana, part of Tulane University.
- Washington National Primate Research Center on the University of Washington campus, in Seattle, Washington.
- Wisconsin National Primate Research Center located at the University of Wisconsin-Madison.
- Yerkes National Primate Research Center, at Emory University in Atlanta, Georgia.
