= Britches =

Britches may refer to:

- Breeches, or britches, an item of clothing
- Britches (monkey), a baby monkey removed from a laboratory by the Animal Liberation Front.
