= Geoffrey Bourne =

Geoffrey Bourne may refer to:

- Geoffrey Bourne, Baron Bourne (1902–1982), British soldier
- Geoffrey H. Bourne (1909–1988), Australian/American anatomist
