= Zhang Haidi =

Chinese writer, politician with physical disability

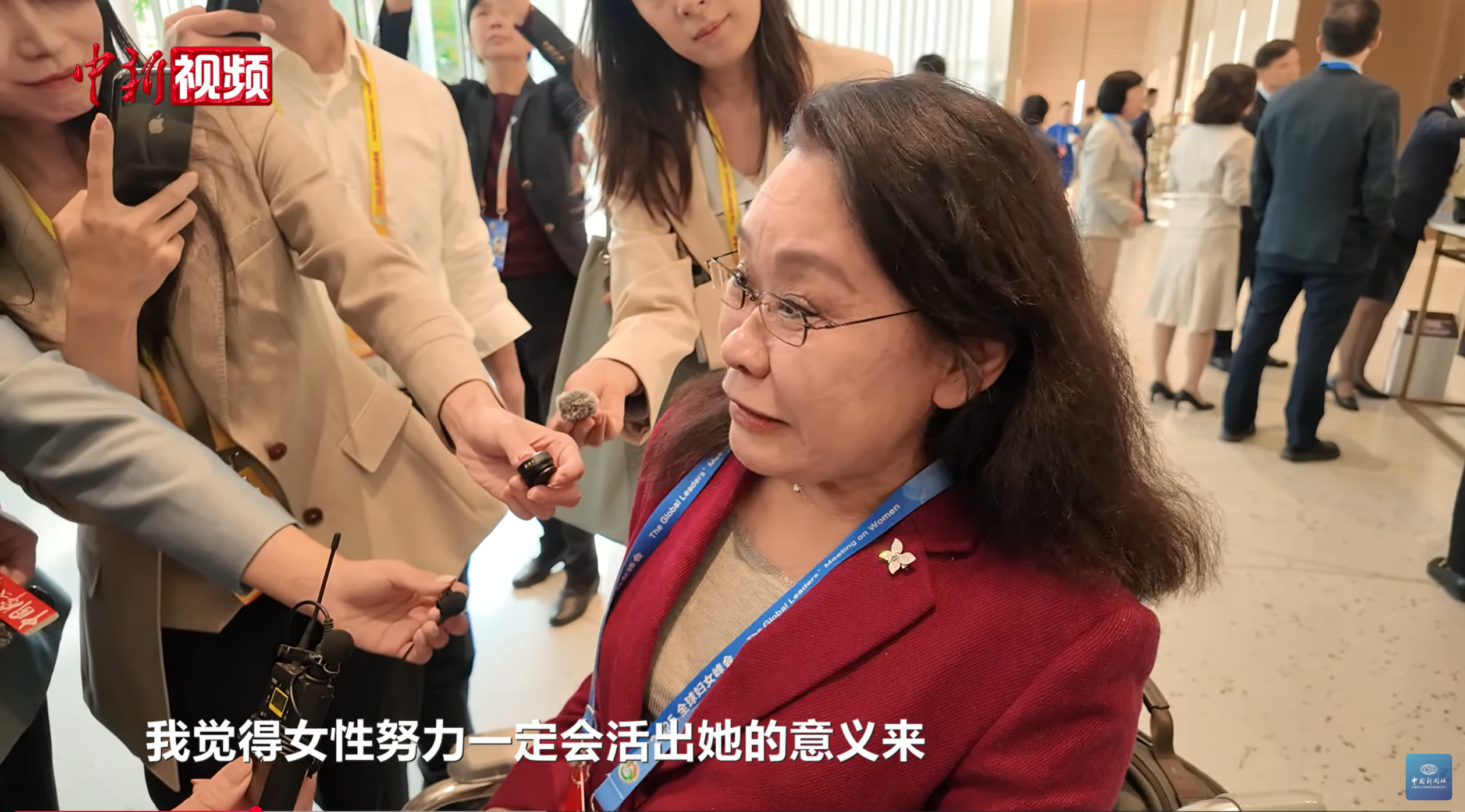
Zhang Haidi at 2025 Global Leaders' Meeting on Women

Zhang Haidi (Chinese: 张海迪; born September 1955) is a Chinese writer, translator, and chairwoman of China Administration of Sports for Persons with Disabilities (CASPD), the national paralympic committee of China. A paraplegic since early childhood, she has been called the Helen Keller and Pavel Korchagin of China. Since the early 1980s, she has been hailed as a role model for disabled people and for Chinese youths in general, a "Lei Feng of the 80s".

== Early life ==
Zhang Haidi was born in September 1955 in Jinan, Shandong Province. She became a paraplegic at age five. Due to pathological conditions in her blood vessels near the dura mater of her spine, she underwent six major operations to have six of her spinal plates removed between 1960 and 1976. As a result, she became paralyzed in her lower body.

== Career ==
Unable to attend school because of her disability, she taught herself to university level. She learned multiple foreign languages, including English, Japanese, German, and Esperanto, and became a translator and writer. In 1993, Jilin University awarded her a master's degree in philosophy.

Zhang worked at Chengguan Hospital in Shen County, Shandong, and as a radio repairwoman for the local broadcast station. In the early 1980s, she toured China giving inspirational speeches, and became famous throughout the country. The Chinese Communist Party (CCP) found in her a new model for the Chinese youth, and waged a national campaign to publicize her life story. She joined the CCP in December 1982.

She wrote many books, including Beautiful English, written in both Chinese and English. Her novel A Dream in Wheelchair has been published in Japan and Korea. She also translated many Western literary works into Chinese. Her translation of Ralph Helfer's Modoc: The True Story of the Greatest Elephant That Ever Lived won a national prize for translated works. She is a member of the China Writers Association and was a visiting scholar at the Internationales Künstlerhaus Villa Concordia in Bamberg, Germany, from 2007 to 2008.

Zhang Haidi has been a member of several sessions of the National Committee of the Chinese People's Political Consultative Conference (CPPCC), and has been an advocate for disabled rights, calling for improved accessibility and for rights for the disabled to drive. In 2002, China Central Television broadcast a program devoted to her. In November 2008, she was elected Chairperson of China Disabled Persons' Federation (CDPF), succeeding Deng Pufang.

In 2013, the University of York awarded her an honorary doctorate degree.

== Personal ==
Zhang Haidi is married to Wang Zuoliang (王佐良).
