= Primarily Primates =

Primate sanctuary in Texas

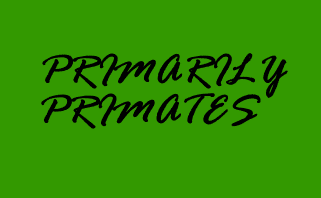
- Interactive map of Primarily Primates
- 29°41′21.15″N 98°40′59.02″W
- Date opened: 1978
- Location: Bexar County, Texas; United States
- Land area: 30 hectares (74 acres)
- No. of animals: 347
- Website: primarilyprimates.org

Primarily Primates (PPI) is a nonprofit organization in Bexar County, Texas, that operates an animal sanctuary, housing 347 non-human primates and a variety of other birds and animals released from use in entertainment, research, or as rescues from the exotic pet trade. The organization was founded by Wallace (Wally) Swett in 1978, who ran the facility until 2006, when the Texas attorney general took control of it after allegations of substandard animal care. It has since been passed to new management, and operates in 2018, with a $1.1 million dollar budget. Primarily Primates employs 16 people for management and care staff, and a full-time veterinarian to assure high standards of animal care, enrichment, and nutrition.

Primarily Primates is accredited as a "true" sanctuary by the Global Federation of Animal Sanctuaries.

== Background ==
Animals at the shelter include primates formerly used in animal research, chimpanzees retired from the United States Air Force (mostly Holloman Air Force Base) and the NASA space program, and Oliver, a chimpanzee exhibited around the world for many years and often referred to as the "humanzee," because of speculation in the past that he might be part human. One former tenant was Britches the monkey who was removed from a laboratory as an infant in a raid perpetuated by the Animal Liberation Front. Other notable chimpanzees now living there include Willie and Harry who appeared in the film, Project X. Willie played Virgil, a chimpanzee who was taught to pilot planes.

The Texas attorney general took control of the sanctuary in October 2006 after allegations that the facility was "unfit," and that public donations had been misspent while the animals lived in substandard accommodation. An Austin probate court put the sanctuary into temporary receivership and appointed a primate expert, Lee Theisen-Watt, to evaluate the animals' condition and supervise their care. The attorney general asked the court permanently to remove Wally Swett and his associates, and require them to repay some of the funds that were allegedly misspent. In April 2007, a settlement was reached appointing a new board of directors, which placed Priscilla Feral, president of Friends of Animals, a Connecticut-based animal-rights group that funded Primarily Primates as its president of the board. At the conclusion of the Receivership, spokesman Kelly for the attorney-general's office said in a statement that "[t]he troubling conditions at Primarily Primates have been remedied."

== Temporary receivership ==
The controversy began when a former volunteer of the sanctuary set up undercover footage showing sick animals and primates confined in small cages. The material was handed to People for the Ethical Treatment of Animals (PETA), which filed a lawsuit against Primarily Primates in March 2006. The courts dismissed the lawsuit, but the controversy continued. Both sides made serious allegations against the other, with PETA maintaining a highly critical website called Primarily Primates: Hell On Earth For Animals.

The Texas attorney general's office ordered the takeover of the sanctuary on Friday, October 13, 2006, and the appointment of a temporary receiver. Lee Theisen-Watt, a primatologist, was placed in charge of the sanctuary. Confirming overcrowding and claiming inadequate conditions, she began relocating animals to appropriate facilities, and after Friends of Animals took over management of the sanctuary, some of the animals were returned.

=== New management ===
On May 1, 2007, the temporary receivership concluded and a new management team arrived. Chimp Haven, a sanctuary to which a number of chimpanzees were relocated during the receivership, chose not to return the chimpanzees to PPI.

=== Settlement ===
On April 27, 2007, the state of Texas entered into a settlement agreement which concluded the term of Court Appointed Receiver, Lee Theisen-Watt, and approved a board of directors headed by Eric Turton and Priscilla Feral. The settlement also dismissed all charges against Primarily Primates. Swett was required to leave the property and was prohibited from serving either on the board or as an employee.

In May 2007, Texas courts handed management of the facility to Friends of Animals, with a new board of directors headed by Priscilla Feral and employed Stephen Tello as executive director, who had previously been involved in running the facility for 20 years. In addition to Tello, the new board consists of Priscilla Feral of Friends of Animals, which funded Primarily Primates'; and Lou Griffin, a primatologist with laboratory experience of non-human primates. A primate veterinarian, Dr. Michele Martino, also joined the board, but resigned soon after. In a press release, Feral stated: "My promise to donors, advocates, and the public is that this sanctuary will be tidy, well-run, communicative, and a place advocates can be proud to support."

A spokesman for the Texas attorney general's office, Tom Kelley, stated, "The troubling conditions at Primarily Primates have been remedied [by the court-appointed receivership]." This allowed for the Office of the Attorney General to settle with the defendants, requiring they maintain the new standards. He confirmed that Wally Swett was permanently barred from the facility as part of the settlement.
