= David H. Ledbetter =

Human geneticist

David Hamilton Ledbetter (b. 1953) is a human geneticist best known for his contributions to the discovery of the genetic causes of Prader–Willi and Miller–Dieker syndromes. His research has focused on developing and applying technologies to understand neurodevelopmental conditions such as autism spectrum disorders. He has held leadership positions at the National Institutes of Health, the University of Chicago, Emory University, and until 2020, was the Executive Vice President and Chief Scientific Officer of Geisinger Health System. He is currently the Senior Associate Director for Precision Medicine at the Florida Institute for Pediatric Rare Diseases at the Florida State University College of Medicine

== Education ==
- Ledbetter received a Ph.D from the University of Texas, Austin, in 1971. He holds an American Board of Medical Genetics and Genomics certification in clinical cytogenetics.

== Career ==
Ledbetter attended Tulane University and started working at Baylor College of Medicine, working as the Professor at the Institute for Molecular Genetics and Director of the Kleberg Cytogenetics and Prenatal Diagnosis Laboratory.

In 1981, Ledbetter and his colleagues discovered the causes of Prader-Willi Syndrome, finding that it was caused by a deletion on Chromosome 15. It was published on the New England Journal of Medicine.

Ledbetter than went on to work at The University of Chicago, working as the Professor in Obstetrics and Gynecology and Director of the Center for Medical Genetics. In 1996, while working there, Ledbetter was asked to examine the DNA of Oliver, a chimp suspected of being a humanzee, a hybrid of a human and a chimp. Ledbetter's tests confirmed that Oliver had the normal 48 chromosomes that a chimp has.

Ledbetter then moved to work at Emory University in Atlanta, Georgia as the Robert W. Woodruff Professor of Human Genetics and the Director of Medical Genetics in the Emory University School of Medicine.

From 2025, Ledbetter has served as Senior Associate Director for Precision Medicine at the Florida State University College of Medicine.

== Most cited papers ==
- Baker SJ, Fearon ER, Nigro JM, Hamilton SR, Preisinger AC, Jessup JM, VanTuinen P, Ledbetter DH, Barker DF, Nakamura Y, White R. Chromosome 17 deletions and p53 gene mutations in colorectal carcinomas. Science. 1989 Apr 14;244(4901):217-21.
- Miller DT, Adam MP, Aradhya S, Biesecker LG, Brothman AR, Carter NP, Church DM, Crolla JA, Eichler EE, Epstein CJ, Faucett WA. Consensus statement: chromosomal microarray is a first-tier clinical diagnostic test for individuals with developmental disabilities or congenital anomalies. The American Journal of Human Genetics. 2010 May 14;86(5):749-64.
- Sanders SJ, Ercan-Sencicek AG, Hus V, Luo R, Murtha MT, Moreno-De-Luca D, Chu SH, Moreau MP, Gupta AR, Thomson SA, Mason CE. Multiple recurrent de novo CNVs, including duplications of the 7q11. 23 Williams syndrome region, are strongly associated with autism. Neuron. 2011 Jun 9;70(5):863-85.
- Reiner O, Carrozzo R, Shen Y, Wehnert M, Faustinella F, Dobyns WB, Caskey CT, Ledbetter DH. Isolation of a Miller–Dicker lissencephaly gene containing G protein β-subunit-like repeats. Nature. 1993 Aug;364(6439):717-21.
- Sanders SJ, He X, Willsey AJ, Ercan-Sencicek AG, Samocha KE, Cicek AE, Murtha MT, Bal VH, Bishop SL, Dong S, Goldberg AP. Insights into autism spectrum disorder genomic architecture and biology from 71 risk loci. Neuron. 2015 Sep 23;87(6):1215-33.
- Ledbetter DH, Riccardi VM, Airhart SD, Strobel RJ, Keenan BS, Crawford JD. Deletions of chromosome 15 as a cause of the Prader–Willi syndrome. New England Journal of Medicine. 1981 Feb 5;304(6):325-9.
