= Primate (1974 film) =

1974 documentary by Frederick Wiseman

- Directed by: Frederick Wiseman
- Produced by: Frederick Wiseman
- Cinematography: William Brayne
- Edited by: Frederick Wiseman
- Production company: Zipporah Films
- Release date: December 5, 1974
- Running time: 105 minutes
- Country: United States
- Language: English

Primate is a 1974 American documentary film directed by Frederick Wiseman, which explores the Yerkes National Primate Research Center.
