= Ilya Ivanov =

Russian-Soviet biologist (1870–1932)

- Илья Иванов
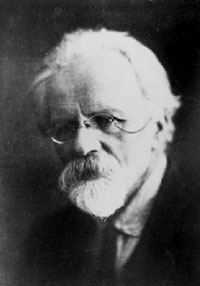
- Ivanov in 1927
- Born: 1 August [O.S. 20 July] 1870; Shchigry, Kursk Governorate, Russian Empire
- Died: 20 March 1932 (aged 61); Alma-Ata, Kazakh ASSR, Russian SFSR, Soviet Union
- Education: University of Kharkiv
- Known for: Artificial insemination
- Scientific career
- Fields: Biology

Ilya Ivanovich Ivanov (Russian: Илья Иванович Иванов, 1 August [O.S. 20 July] 1870 – 20 March 1932) was a Russian and Soviet biologist who specialized in the field of artificial insemination and the interspecific hybridization of animals. He is famous for his controversial attempts to create a human–chimpanzee hybrid by inseminating three female chimpanzees with human sperm.

== Biography ==
Ilya Ivanovich Ivanov was born in the town of Shchigry, Russia. He graduated from Kharkiv University in 1896 and became a professor in 1907. He worked as a researcher in the Askania-Nova natural reserve, also for the State Experimental Veterinary Institute (1917–1921, 1924–1930), for the Central Experimental Station for Researching Reproduction of Domestic Animals (1921–1924), and for the Moscow Higher Zootechnic Institute (1928–1930).

Around the start of the 20th century, Ilya Ivanov perfected artificial insemination and its practical usage for horse breeding. He proved that this technology allows one stallion to fertilize up to 500 mares (instead of 20–30 by natural fertilization). The results were sensational for their time, and Ivanov's station was frequented by horse breeders from many parts of the world.

In the course of a general political shakeup in the Soviet scientific world, Ivanov and several scientists involved in primate research and experiments lost their positions. In the spring of 1930, Ivanov came under political criticism at his veterinary institute. Finally, on December 13, 1930, Ivanov was arrested. He was sentenced to five years of exile to Alma Ata, where he worked for the Kazakh Veterinary-Zoologist Institute until his death from a stroke on 20 March 1932. The physiologist and psychologist Ivan Pavlov wrote an obituary for him.

== Human-chimpanzee hybridization experiments ==
The most controversial of Ivanov's studies was his attempt to create a human-chimpanzee hybrid. As early as 1910, he had given a presentation to the World Congress of Zoologists in Graz, Austria, in which he described the possibility of obtaining such a hybrid through artificial insemination.

In the 1920s, Ivanov carried out a series of experiments to create a human/nonhuman ape hybrid in French Guinea. Three female chimpanzees were inseminated with human sperm, and he failed in creating a pregnancy. In 1929, after returning to the Soviet Union, he attempted to organize a set of experiments involving nonhuman ape sperm and human volunteers but was delayed by the death of his last orangutan.

== In popular culture ==
Season 1, episode 1, of the 2011 science fiction and horror dramatized documentary television series Dark Matters: Twisted But True features a segment, "Ape-Man Army," in which the theories of Ivanov on human-chimpanzee hybridization are dramatized.

Ivanov is a character in J. Manfred Weichsel's transgressive novel Jungle Jitters. He is portrayed as faking his death and restarting his experiments in the Congo, where his descendants form a cult dedicated to the idea of creating a posthuman race of fertile humanzees.

=== Orango ===
His work was one of the sources of inspiration for the unfinished satirical opera Orango whose Prologue was sketched in 1932 by Dmitri Shostakovich with a libretto by Aleksey Nikolayevich Tolstoy and Alexander Osipovich Starchakov but the whole was later abandoned and discarded. The manuscript was found by Olga Digonskaya, a Russian musicologist, in the Glinka Museum, Moscow in 2004 and orchestrated by Gerard McBurney; this work was premiered on 2 December 2011 in Los Angeles, California by the Los Angeles Philharmonic under Esa-Pekka Salonen (conductor) and staged by Peter Sellars (director).

== See also ==
- Alexander Bogdanov
- Vladimir Demikhov
- Heart of a Dog
- Humanzee
- Russian Institute of Medical Primatology
