= Animal testing at the University of Washington =

Practice at the University of Washington

The University of Washington practices animal testing for a variety of purposes, including biomedical testing and paramedic training. Testing is performed by faculty from various departments across the university, and is conducted on animals including dogs, rabbits, primates, pigs, sheep, gerbils, bobcats, ferrets, and coyotes. Testing on primates is done through the Washington National Primate Research Center, which is located on campus. Animal testing at UW is overseen by the university's Institutional Animal Care and Use Committee (IACUC).

== Use of live pigs ==
=== Paramedic training ===
UW uses live pigs to train paramedics to perform a surgical airway procedure, in which a person's neck is cut into to create an emergency airway. This practice has received criticism from various individuals and organizations, including the Physicians Committee for Responsible Medicine (PCRM), members of the Washington House of Representatives, UW students, and paramedic Cindy Coker. The PCRM reported that each year UW uses 20-40 pigs for this training, after which the pigs are euthanized. In January 2017, eight members of the Washington House of Representatives sent a letter to UW asking them to consider replacing the procedures on pigs with other methods.

=== Surgical training ===
In 2019, UW's medical school resumed using live pigs for surgical training after a five-year hiatus. This decision was criticized by the Physicians Committee for Responsible Medicine as well as UW professor Lisa Jones-Engel.

In November of 2021 The University of Washington confirmed that it has ended the use of live animals including pigs for the training of paramedics.

== Incidents and controversies ==
=== Lab incidents ===
From 2011 to 2012, a member of a research team neglected to administer proper pain medication to thirty rabbits. On February 5, 2013, the same individual violated protocol by administering anesthesia to another rabbit improperly during surgery.

In 2013, a fractured pelvis was discovered in a rabbit, resulting in paralysis and euthanasia. Even though the laboratory claimed to have no explanation, it was discovered that a technician had handled the animal the day before, and a necropsy suggested that the injury occurred on that day.

In February 2014, the USDA discovered that a guinea pig had died, after receiving inadequate pain relief following an operation three days earlier.

=== IACUC membership confidentiality lawsuit ===
In 2022, due to pressure from the animal rights group PETA, the University of Washington agreed to publicly release the names of the members of UW's Institutional Animal Care and Use Committee (IACUC). In response, the IACUC members, led by IACUC chair Jane Sullivan, sued UW claiming that public release of their names would threaten their safety. Former UW IACUC member Lisa Jones-Engel criticized the attempt to keep the names private. Jones-Engel claimed that hiding the names allows UW to hide the fact that the IACUC has an unbalanced composition and has a strong bias towards the promotion of animal experimentation. In April 2022, a US district judge issued a preliminary injunction which prevented the release of the IACUC members' names.

== Animal Research and Care Facility (ARCF) ==
A significant amount of animal testing at UW takes place at the Animal Research and Care Facility (ARCF), which is located at the south end of UW Seattle's campus on NE Pacific St.

=== Development ===
On November 14, 2013, UW's Board of Regents unanimously approved plans for a new animal testing lab. The facility was initially budgeted at $123.5 million. In January 2017, the Board of Regents approved an additional $18.5 million to finish construction.

Development of the lab was protested by animal rights activists. Several protests occurred during construction of the lab, with a large protest of about 500 people occurring on April 25, 2015.

In 2015, it was revealed by a King County Superior Court case that UW's governing board, the Board of Regents, violated Washington's Open Public Meetings Act law by discussing the new animal lab at the UW president's home. The judge determined that the Board of Regents violated the law on 24 occasions from 2012 to 2014, by discussing the animal lab and other business over dinner.

== See also ==
- Washington National Primate Research Center
