= Russian Institute of Medical Primatology =

Historic biomedical research center

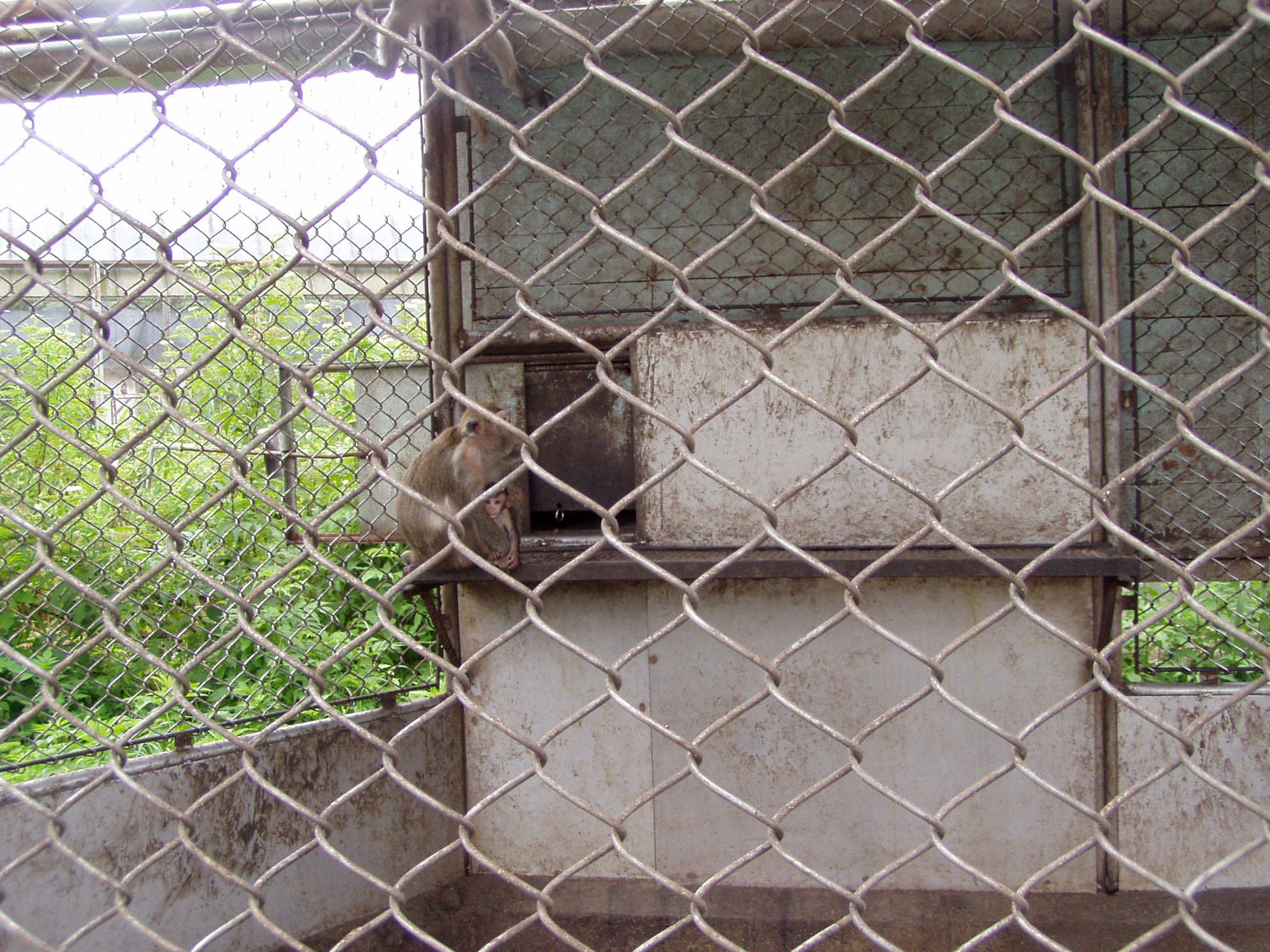
Photographed 2007

The Russian Institute of Medical Primatology (RIMP) (Russian: НАУЧНО-ИССЛЕДОВАТЕЛЬСКИЙ ИНСТИТУТ МЕДИЦИНСКОЙ ПРИМАТОЛОГИИ) near Sochi (originally the Sukhum Primate Station, established at Sukhum, Abkhasia, Georgia SSR in 1927) is a historically significant biomedical research center. The Sukhumi site was "the oldest medical primate center in the world." The Sochi facility has microbiology, anatomy, pathology, cancer biology, and "colony management and behavior" laboratories and is situated on a 100 ha (1.0 km^{2}; 0.39 sq mi) site that includes indoor and outdoor enclosures for the monkeys.

== History and research ==
The first primate colony arrived at the site on August 24, 1927. Since that time the lab has been major biomedical research facility. The station hosted a primate nursery and supplied primates to over 50 research institutions. Some 20 species of animal were researched over the course of the lab's existence to date. The primates at the lab were used for important antibiotic, vaccine and radiobiological testing. A 1956 visit to the lab by Paul Dudley White and subsequent report to the U.S. Congress led to the creation of the several U.S. Regional Primate Centers. In 1957 it hosted 773 primates and in 1966 the population was of primates at the lab was 2,018. Prior to the War in Abkhazia (1992–1993), there were 7,000 animals at the lab but only 300 survived and the researchers moved to Sochi by the end of the decade. In 1998 the lab had about 2500 animals, including crab-eating macaques, grivets, Hamadryas baboons, and Rhesus macaques.

Notorious in the west as the site of Ilya Ivanovich Ivanov's human-primate hybridization experiments, "Professor Ivanov was never a staff member of the center. In fact he visited there only once for a few days in the early summer of 1928." Research and researchers at the center were suppressed under the Soviet regime; "by the early 1960s they had accumulated more than 500 finished but unpublished reports." In 1963, director Boris A. Lapin cowrote the first textbook on primate pathology with L. A. Yakovleva.

The several other names for the lab, past and present, include Sukhumi Monkey Colony of the Moscow Institute of Endocrinology and Institute of Medical Primatology of the Russian Academy of Medical Sciences (RAMS).
