= Emory National Primate Research Center =

Primate research branch of Emory University

Coordinates: 33°48′11″N 84°19′05″W

The Emory National Primate Research Center (formerly known as Yerkes National Primate Research Center) located in Atlanta, Georgia, owned by Emory University, is a center of biomedical and behavioral research, is dedicated to improving human and animal health, and is the oldest of seven National Primate Research Centers partially funded by the National Institutes of Health. It is known for its nationally and internationally recognized biomedical and behavioral studies with nonhuman primates by Emory University.

Its 25-acre (10 ha) Main Station contains most of the center's biomedical research laboratories. The center also includes the Living Links Center and the 117-acre (47 ha) Field Station near Lawrenceville, Georgia.

== History ==
The center was established in 1930 by Robert Yerkes, in Orange Park, Florida, associated then with Yale University. Yerkes was a pioneering primatologist who specialized in comparative psychology. Though the center initially focused on studying primates themselves, its focus shifted to biomedical research in the 1940s.

In 1965, it relocated to its location on the campus of Emory University.

In April 2022, Emory University removed Yerkes' name from the center, after a review by Emory's Committee on Naming Honors recommended that the name be changed due to Yerkes' past support for eugenics. The Yerkes National Primate Research Center is now known as the Emory National Primate Research Center, effective June 1, 2022.

== Satellite locations ==
The Field Station is a part of the Emory National Primate Research Center, houses 3,400 animals, specializes in behavioral studies of primate social groups, and is located 30 miles (48 km) northeast of Atlanta on 117 acres (47 ha) of wooded land.

The Living Links Center is a part of the Emory National Primate Research Center and was formerly run by primatologist Frans De Waal. Located at the center's Main Station on the Emory campus, work is also carried out at the Field Station.

== Research ==
Multidisciplinary medical research at the research center is primarily aimed at development of medical treatments and vaccines. Research programs include cognitive development and decline, childhood visual defects, organ transplantation, the behavioral effects of hormone replacement therapy and social behaviors of primates. Researchers are also leading programs to better understand the aging process, pioneer organ transplant procedures and provide safer drugs to organ transplant recipients, determine the behavioral effects of hormone replacement therapy, prevent early onset vision disorders and shed light on human behavioral evolution. Researchers have had success creating transgenic rhesus macaque monkeys with Huntington's disease and hope to breed a second generation of macaques with the genetic disorder.

== Controversy and incidents ==
The center has long been the target of protest for its treatment of animals. This was especially true after the release of Frederick Wiseman's 1974 film Primate, which was shot at the research center and depicted primates undergoing surgical procedures, as well as a transcardial perfusion and brain extraction.

The center's proposal to do AIDS-related research on endangered sooty mangabey monkeys drew opposition from numerous primatologists, including Jane Goodall.

Emory National Primate Research Center research assistant Elizabeth Griffin became the first work-related death in the center's history on December 10, 1997, due to herpes B virus. Griffin apparently became infected after a fluid exposure to the eye which occurred while helping to move a caged rhesus macaque at the Field Station. The Occupational Safety and Health Administration ultimately fined the center $105,300 in 1998 after a 19-week investigation. The event led to reforms in safety protocols for handling research primates.

On June 15, 2011, at the Field Station, personnel determined that Ep13, a non-infected female rhesus macaque, was missing. On August 16, 2011, the search for Ep13 ended.

In December 2014, a macaque was found dead in an enclosure adjacent to the one in which she was supposed to be housed. Staff at the facility failed to notice that the macaque was not in the correct enclosure.

In January 2015, a macaque was euthanized after being in distress for at least two weeks. A necropsy revealed that the macaque was in distress because staff had applied a rubber band to the animal during application of an identification tattoo, but had failed to remove the rubber band.

In December 2015, a male macaque was euthanized after being sick from surgery a week prior. A necropsy revealed that the macaque was sick as a result of a piece of gauze being left in his abdomen during surgery, which caused adhesions and intestinal obstruction.

In July 2017, a primate was mistakenly euthanized after a technician mistakenly entered the wrong code into the euthanization schedule.

In August 2017, a primate had to be given surgery after a gauze sponge was left in its abdomen from a different surgery a week prior.

In August 2021, a female macaque died after her leg got caught in a gap in the wall of her housing facility. An investigation determined that the housing facility was not constructed properly.

In October 2021, the USDA reported that the center had not properly cleaned food waste from several macaque housing enclosures. It was reported that food waste had not been cleaned up for three to four weeks. In some cases, the accumulation of food waste prevented drainage of rainwater, attracted flies, and started to accumulate mold.

== Directors ==
Name	From	To
Robert Yerkes (Founder of Yerkes Center; PhD Harvard; known for work in comparative psychology)	1930	1941
Karl Lashley (PhD Johns Hopkins University in genetics; psychologist and behaviorist; remembered for his contributions to the study of learning and memory)	1941	1955
Henry Wieghorst Nissen (Professor of Psychobiology at Yale & Emory; leading authority on the biology and psychology of primates)	1955	1958
Arthur J. Riopelle (doctorate in experimental psychology, primatologist)	1959	1962
Geoffrey H. Bourne (University of Oxford DSc and PhD; histochemistry and cell biology, primatology)	1962	1978
Frederick (Fred) A. King (main focus was the interaction between cognitive and limbic functions)	1978	1994
Thomas R. Insel (now director of National Institute of Mental Health)	1994	1999
Thomas P Gordon (became Head, Neuroscience Center)	1999	2002
Stuart Zola (one of the nation's leading neuroscientists)	2002	2014
R. Paul Johnson, M.D. (former chairman of Division of Immunology and professor of medicine at Harvard Medical School; Board Certified in Internal Medicine with a Certification in Infectious Diseases; research interests include identification of immune responses)	2014	present

== See also ==
- California National Primate Research Center
- Oregon National Primate Research Center
- The Mind of an Ape
- Herpes B Virus
- Yerkish
- Ozzie (gorilla)
- Chantek
