= Japanese Village and Deer Park =

Former American amusement park

Coordinates: 33°52′13″N 118°00′35″W

The Japanese Village and Deer Park is a defunct amusement park formerly located in Buena Park, California.

== History ==
The park first opened in 1967 at 6122 Knott Avenue. It was a Japanese-themed amusement park that featured shows and traditional Japanese buildings in an environment where deer roamed free (inspired by Nara Park). Its gate featured a torii.

Two episodes of the CBS-TV detective drama Mannix, "Overkill" (1971, Season 4 episode 24) and "Enter Tami Okada" (1974, Season 8 episode 8), filmed extensive sequences at the park. Various exhibits and animals can be seen in both. The second featured a trainer riding two dolphins in tandem.

The park closed in 1975, five years after it was sold to Great Southwest Co., a subsidiary of Six Flags.Facing mounting red ink, the owners began giving the deer lethal injections, claiming they had tuberculosis. Almost 200 were euthanized before authorities ended the practice.

== List of attractions ==
- Koi ponds
- Japanese Garden
- Classic Tea House
- The Dove Pavilion
- Dolphin feeding
- Home of the Fuji Folk
- Pearl divers

== Enchanted Village ==
After the park closed, a second amusement park, Enchanted Village, opened on the site on June 18, 1976. Animal trainer Ralph Helfer was a partner and served as chair. It was, for a time, home to Oliver the "human" chimpanzee. Prior to its closure, its signature stunt and animal show was changed to incorporate themes and story lines from the 1977 film The Island of Dr. Moreau. Enchanted Village can be seen briefly in the 1977 film Curse of the Black Widow. The 32-acre (13 ha) park was South Pacific-Tiki themed, and featured trained animal shows (Helfer's influence), a traditional-styled Polynesian show, and a few ride attractions. The park closed in fall 1977.

== Current use ==
The area has been developed into a business park; nothing remains of the ponds and locations except George Bellis Park.
