= National Primate Research Center =

Group of U.S. publicly funded biomedical research centers

National Primate Research Centers are a network of seven research programs in the United States funded by the National Institutes of Health to conduct biomedical research on primates. Each center is affiliated with a university or other host institution.

== Research Centers ==
- California National Primate Research Center (affiliated with UC Davis, Davis, California)
- Oregon National Primate Research Center (affiliated with Oregon Health & Science University, Portland)
- Southwest National Primate Research Center (affiliated with the Texas Biomedical Research Institute, San Antonio)
- Tulane National Biomedical Research Center (affiliated with Tulane University, New Orleans, Louisiana)
- Washington National Primate Research Center (affiliated with the University of Washington, Seattle)
- Wisconsin National Primate Research Center (affiliated with the University of Wisconsin, Madison)
- Emory National Primate Research Center (affiliated with Emory University, Atlanta, Georgia)

== Former Research Centers ==
- New England Primate Research Center (affiliated with Harvard University) (1966–2015)
