= Oliver (chimpanzee) =

Chimpanzee falsely promoted as a chimpanzee-human hybrid

- Early media photograph of Oliver
- Species: Chimpanzee
- Sex: Male
- Born: c. 1957; Belgian Congo (present-day Democratic Republic of the Congo)
- Died: June 2, 2012 (aged 55); San Antonio, Texas, U.S.
- Known for: Rumors of being a missing link or humanzee
- Owner: Various
- Mate: Raisin

Oliver (c. 1957 – 2 June 2012) was a former "performing" chimpanzee once promoted as a missing link or "humanzee" due to his somewhat human-like appearance and a tendency to walk upright. Despite his somewhat unusual appearance and behavior, scientists found that Oliver was not a human-chimpanzee hybrid.

== Early life ==
Supposedly, the chimpanzee was caught in the Congo. Oliver was acquired as a young animal in 1970 by trainers Frank and Janet Berger. Some physical and behavioral evidence led the Bergers to believe Oliver was a creature other than a chimpanzee, perhaps a human-chimpanzee hybrid. Oliver possessed a flatter face than his fellow chimpanzees; was in the habit of walking bipedally, rather than on his knuckles much more often than his chimpanzee peers (until he was later struck with arthritis); and may have preferred human females over chimpanzee females. In a December 16, 2006 Discovery Channel special, Janet Berger stated that Oliver started to become attracted to her when he reached the age of 16. She and her husband Frank Berger decided to sell Oliver to New York attorney Michael Miller.

== Enchanted Village and other facilities (1977–1989) ==
In 1977, Oliver's owner, Michael Miller, gave Oliver to Ralph Helfer, partner in a small theme park called Enchanted Village in Buena Park, California, built on the site of the defunct Japanese Village and Deer Park attraction. When Enchanted Village closed later that year, Helfer continued exhibiting Oliver in a new venture, Gentle Jungle, which changed locations a few times before finally closing in 1982. The Los Angeles Times did an extensive article about Oliver as a possible missing link or a new subspecies of chimpanzee. Oliver was transferred to the Wild Animal Training Center in Riverside, California, owned by Ken Decroo, but he was reportedly sold by Decroo in 1985. The last trainer to own Oliver was Bill Rivers. Rivers reported problems with Oliver kissing monkeys residing at the same location.

== Buckshire Corporation (1989–1998) ==
Oliver was purchased in 1989 by the Buckshire Corporation, a Pennsylvania laboratory leasing out animals for scientific and cosmetic testing. His intake examination revealed some previous rough handling. He was never used in experiments, but for the next nine years, his home was a small cage, whose restricted size resulted in muscular atrophy to the point that Oliver's limbs trembled. In 1996, Sharon Hursh, president of the Buckshire Corporation, after being petitioned by animal sanctuary Primarily Primates, allowed his retirement to Buckshire's colony of 13 chimpanzees.

== Primarily Primates (1998–2012) ==
In 1998, Oliver was transferred to Primarily Primates, which was founded by Wallace Swett in 1978. Older, partially sighted and arthritic, Oliver ended up at a spacious, open-air cage at Primarily Primates Inc. (PPI) in Bexar County, Texas.

In 2005, just a few years into Oliver's residency at the sanctuary, legal problems emerged after allegations of animal cruelty arose against the facility. Animal rights organization PETA was alerted by volunteers that animals residing at Primarily Primates were kept in barren and dirty cages, warranting the visit of a videographer to document the conditions. Additionally, the deaths of two research chimps sent from Ohio State University to stay at PPI raised more concern for the animals' safety and a lawsuit was filed. Specific regards for the welfare of Oliver were later voiced by Houston SPCA vice president Jorge Ortega in an affidavit, where he claimed that during a visit to the Texas facility he was disturbed by Oliver's enclosure, describing it as "filthy, too small," without "meaningful enrichment materials," and lacking a bucket or bowl for food. Texas Assistant Attorney General Ted Ross argued the long mismanagement of donation funds and understaffing is what led to such detriment.

In 2006, Oliver was placed in the temporary care of wildlife rehabilitator Lee Theisen-Watt, who had been court-appointed to oversee Primarily Primates while the state of Texas determined who would ultimately be in charge of the facility.

On April 27, 2007, the state of Texas entered into a settlement agreement which removed Lee Theisen-Watt as overseer of Primarily Primates and replaced her with a board of directors that was headed by Eric Turton and Priscilla Feral. The settlement also dismissed all charges against Primarily Primates. Wally Swett was required to leave the property and was prohibited from serving either on the board or as an employee in the future.

Oliver remained in the care of Primarily Primates while the facility went through major renovations. Members of the re-formed board of directors expressed concern for Oliver in court proceedings and in news articles about the ongoing dispute over management of the sanctuary. Ethan Calamusa of the Star-Telegram reported that Friends of Animals was merging with Primarily Primates in order to restructure its management and address past concerns about the future of the sanctuary. Oliver lived out the remainder of his life in the care of the restructured Primarily Primates sanctuary.

== Death ==
Oliver spent his last years with another chimpanzee, a female known as Raisin. She was placed with Oliver for companionship, since Oliver's advanced age and years in the research laboratory left him arthritic, mostly blind, and unable to interact daily with younger, more playful chimpanzees at the sanctuary.

News of Oliver, as well as photos, were often posted online by his caregivers, owing to public interest. He took part in regular enrichment activities, including a watermelon smashing party documented in the Friends of Animals online newsletter, and even the chance to paint. Although elderly, Oliver had access to the outdoors and lived the rest of his life in quiet retirement.

Oliver died in his sleep and was found on June 2, 2012, with Raisin next to him; he was at least 55 years old. Stephen René Tello, executive director of Primarily Primates, said that Oliver would be cremated and his ashes would be spread on the grounds of the sanctuary of the primates.

== Genetic testing ==
In 1996, while Oliver was still housed by the Buckshire Corporation, geneticist David H. Ledbetter from the University of Chicago tested portions of his DNA, and revealed that he had the 48 chromosomes of a normal chimpanzee, disproving past rumors that he had 47 (chimpanzees normally have 48 and humans normally have 46). In a separate study, Oliver's cranial morphology, ear shape, freckles, and baldness were found to fall within the range of variability exhibited by the common chimpanzee. Further genetic testing, published in the American Journal of Physical Anthropology, found that Oliver's mitochondrial DNA closely matched that of the central chimpanzee subspecies, which lives in the Republic of the Congo, Gabon, and other areas of Central Africa.

== See also ==
- List of individual apes
