= Friends of Animals =

International nonprofit advocacy group

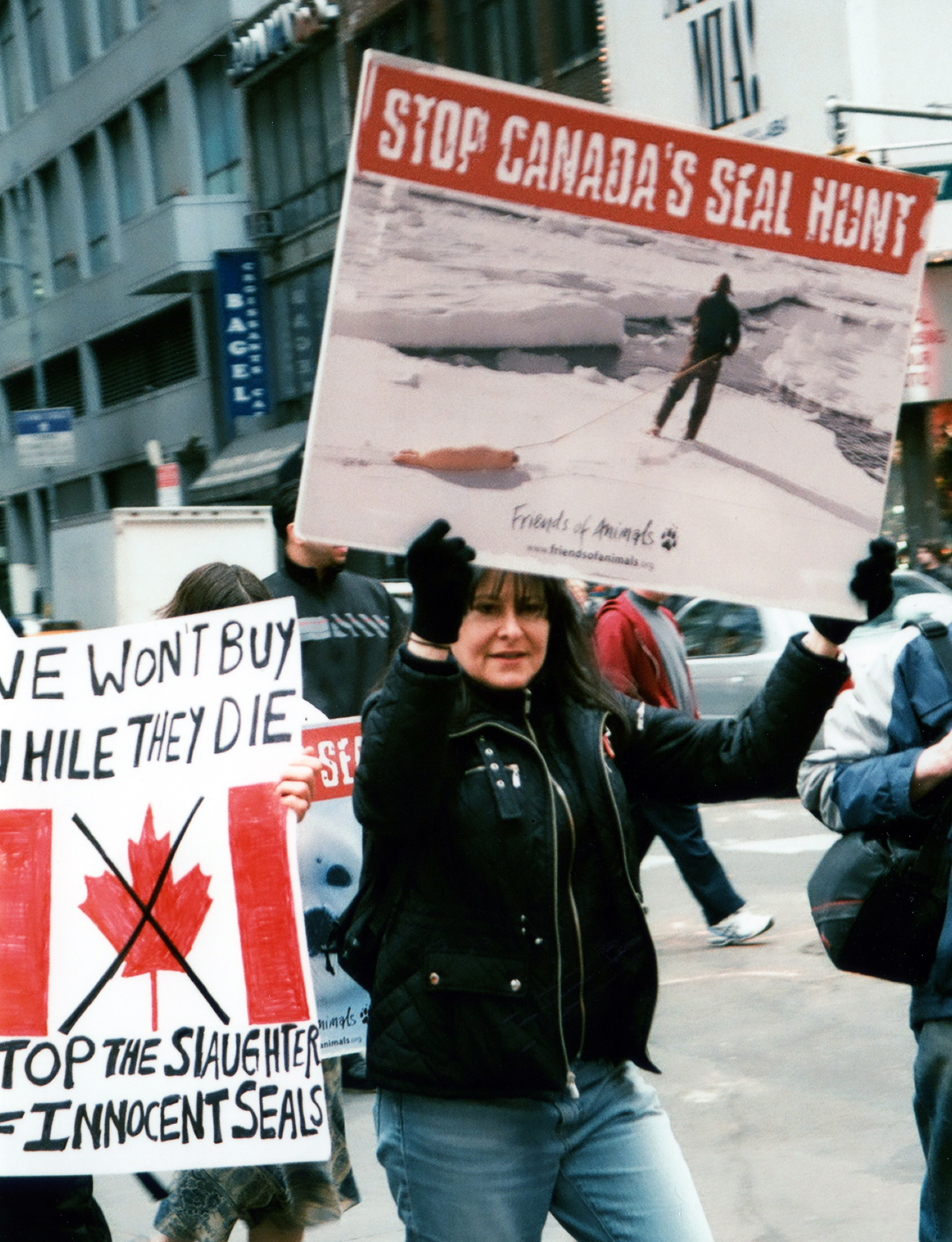
FOA - Stop the Seal Hunt

Friends of Animals (FoA) is a non-profit international animal advocacy organization, established in New York City in 1957, working to free animals around the world from cruelty and institutionalized exploitation. The organization's headquarters is in Darien, Connecticut, with an additional office in Colorado.

== Founding ==
The organization was founded by Alice Herrington in 1957, to protect cats and dogs. "To that end it offered low-cost spaying and neutering services to cut down the number of strays across the country. The organization eventually built its own clinic for this in Neptune, N.J." The organization states that it has assisted in more than 2.5 million spay/neuter procedures.

The organization soon widened its activities to preserve animals in general, including wildlife, marine mammals and zoo animals. Ms. Herrington led the organization until retiring in 1986. The current president is Priscilla Feral.

== Fighting animal testing ==
In 1981, the organization lobbied with United Action for Animals for the introduction in Congress of the Research Modernization Act. This bill sought to develop alternatives to animal testing in research, along with the development of a National Center for Alternatives Research. The bill was ultimately defeated. Animal law professor Gary Francione expressed the view that the bill was opposed by almost all institutional users of animals, because they believed it would require a diversion of funds from animal experiments.

== Primarily Primates ==
In 2006, the organization came to the defense of operators of Primarily Primates, a sanctuary near San Antonio, Texas, that housed "hundreds of chimpanzees, monkeys and other animals that had outlived their usefulness as research subjects, movie props or pets." After People for the Ethical Treatment of Animals made unsubstantiated, false allegations to the Texas Attorney General that were later dismissed, the sanctuary was temporarily put into the control of a receiver by way of an emergency injunction. Friends of Animals paid the legal bills of Primarily Primates, who were trying to regain control of their sanctuary. The Texas Attorney General asked Priscilla Feral, Friends of Animals' president, to establish a new board of directors, and on May 1, 2007, returned the sanctuary to Feral who serves as PPI's voluntary president of the board. Friends of Animals manages the sanctuary as a project with a $1.1 million budget in 2018, a staff of 16 and one full-time veterinarian to assure the highest standards and animal care possible. The sanctuary houses 347 primates, birds and other animals including three rescued wild horses.

== Wildlife Law Program ==
In 2013, the organization established a Wildlife Law Program, focusing on the defense of wildlife and their habitats throughout the world. FoA's Wildlife Law Program works at putting an end to animals' being treated as property within the legal system, and along with winning 12 legal challenges to protect wild horses from government roundups, has secured Endangered Species Act protections for birds and other animals.

In August 2014, the Wildlife Law Program challenged federal agencies at John F. Kennedy International Airport in New York for killing protected Snowy Owls and other migratory birds. The lawsuit argues that the agencies did not disclose the scope and impacts of the bird-reduction program or “discuss all reasonable alternatives to lethal” options, as they were required to do.

Even before the program was established, the organization worked through the legal system to protect the rights of animals. In 2005, many species of endangered African antelopes living on US ranches were listed as endangered as a result of a lawsuit by the organization. However, an exemption for captive breeding programs thwarted the move. In 2009, a further lawsuit resulted in a finding that the exemption was unlawful, restoring the protection against hunting the antelopes.

== See also ==
- List of animal rights groups
