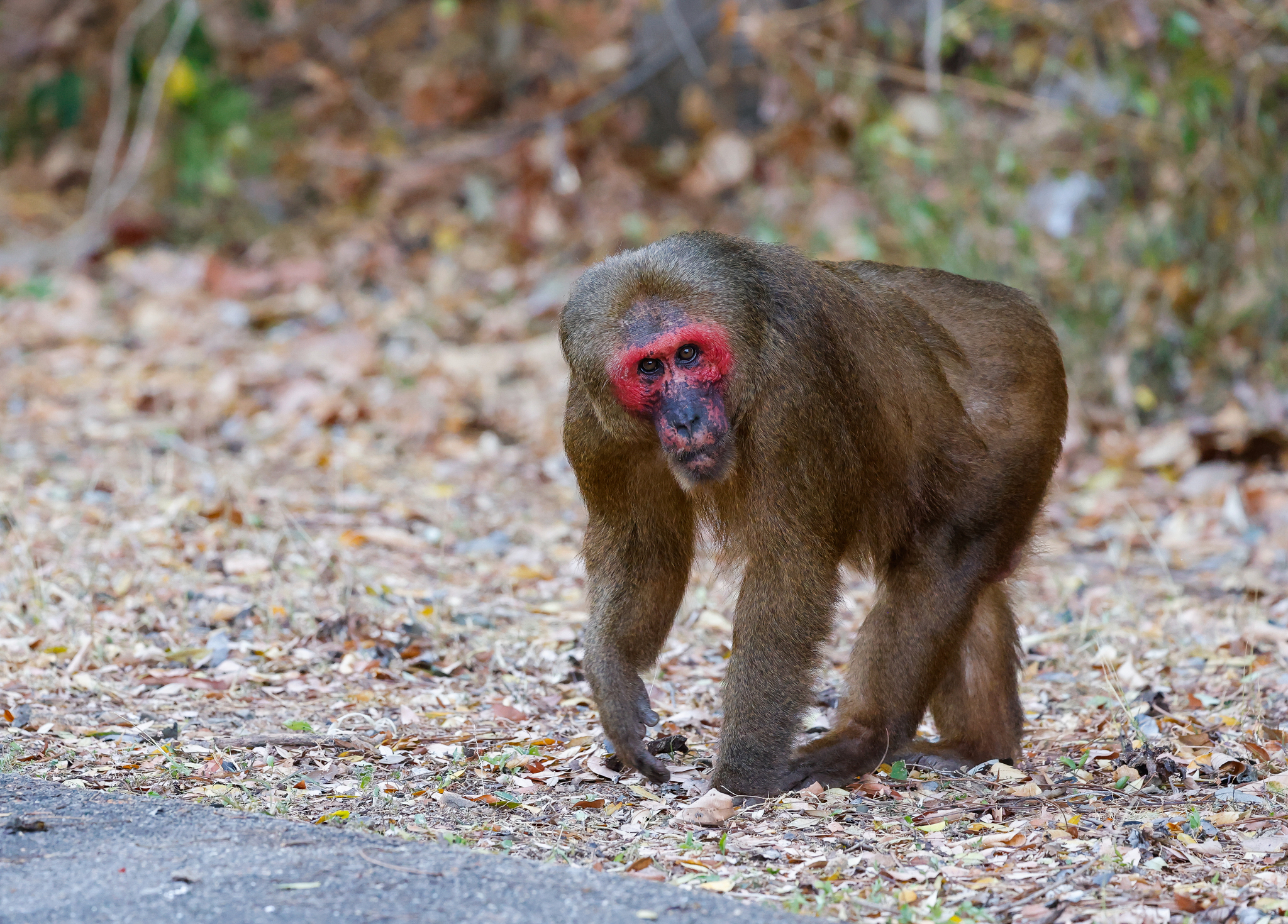
- In Thailand

Conservation status
- Vulnerable (IUCN 3.1)

Scientific classification
- Kingdom: Animalia
- Phylum: Chordata
- Class: Mammalia
- Order: Primates
- Family: Cercopithecidae
- Genus: Macaca
- Species: M. arctoides

Binomial name
- Macaca arctoides (I. Geoffroy Saint-Hilaire, 1831)
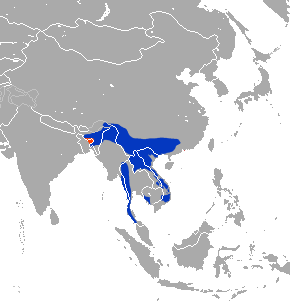
- Stump-tailed macaque range (blue – native, red – introduced, orange – possibly extinct)

Synonyms
- List: Macaca brunneus (Anderson, 1871); Macaca harmandi (Trouessart, 1897); Macaca melanotus (Ogilby, 1839); Macaca melli (Matschie, 1912); Macaca rufescens (Anderson, 1872); Macaca speciosus (Murie, 1875); Macaca ursinus (Gervais, 1854)

= Stump-tailed macaque =

Species of Old World monkey

The stump-tailed macaque (Macaca arctoides), also called the bear macaque, is a species of macaque native to South Asia and Southeast Asia. In India, they can be found south of the Brahmaputra River, in the northeastern part of the country. The range in India extends from Assam and Meghalaya to eastern Arunachal Pradesh, Nagaland, Manipur, Mizoram and Tripura.

These monkeys are primarily frugivorous but eat many types of vegetation, including seeds, leaves, and roots. They also hunt freshwater crabs, frogs, bird eggs and insects.

== Characteristics ==
Stump-tailed macaques have long, thick, fur, and vary widely in their appearance, relative to other primates. Their fur can be gray, brown, reddish, or black, and their faces maybe have freckles or irregular patches. Their short tail ranges between 32 and 69 mm (1.3 and 2.7 in). Like other macaques, they have cheek pouches to store food for short periods of time. Infants are born white and darken as they mature. As they age, their bright pink or red faces darken to brown or nearly black and lose most of the hair. Males are larger than females, measuring 51.7–65 cm (20.4–25.6 in) long and weighing 9.7–10.2 kg (21–22 lb), while females measure 48.5–58.5 cm (19.1–23.0 in) and weigh 7.5–9.1 kg (17–20 lb). Males' canine teeth, which are important for establishing dominance within social groups, are more elongated than those of the females.

== Distribution and habitat ==
The stump-tailed macaque ranges from northeastern India, Myanmar, Thailand and the northwest tip of Peninsular Malaysia to Laos, Cambodia Vietnam and southern China. These monkeys inhabit evergreen and tropical and subtropical moist broadleaf forests at elevations of up to 4,000 m (13,000 ft). They depend on rainforests for food and shelter, only spending time in secondary forests if it is bordering old-growth forest tropical forests. They may be extinct in Bangladesh.

In Cambodia, a population of 230 individuals is reported in Keo Seima Wildlife Sanctuary.

A study population was introduced to Tanaxpillo, an uninhabited island in Lake Catemaco, Veracruz, Mexico in 1974, where it ranges in seminatural conditions. Most information on the species comes from the introduced population on Tanaxpillo and other captive settings, as few long-term studies have been conducted on the stump-tailed macaque in the wild.

== Behaviour and ecology ==
Sound of stump-tailed macaque (Macaca arctoides) – Kaeng Krachan National Park

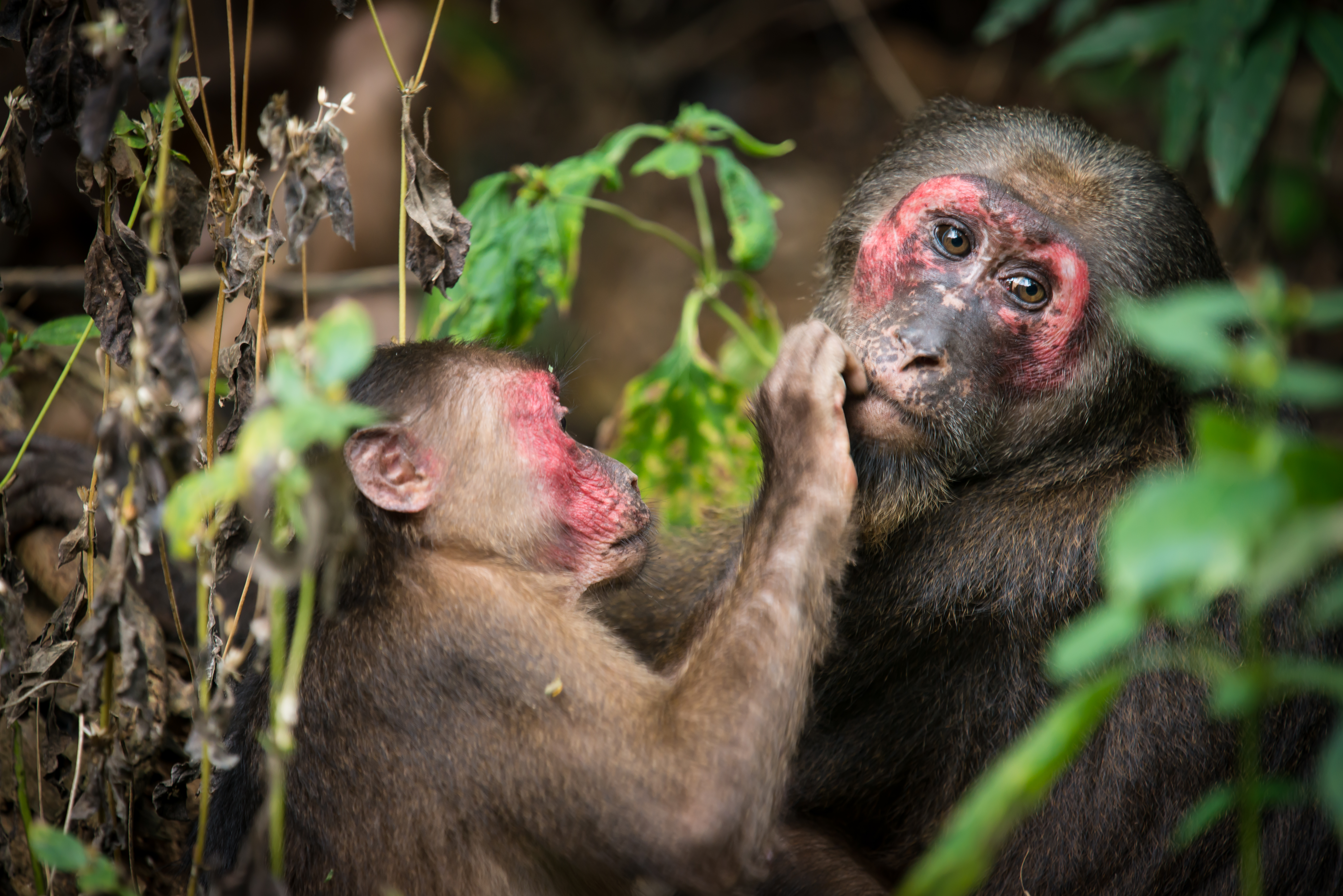
Stumptail macaques in Kaeng Krachan National Park

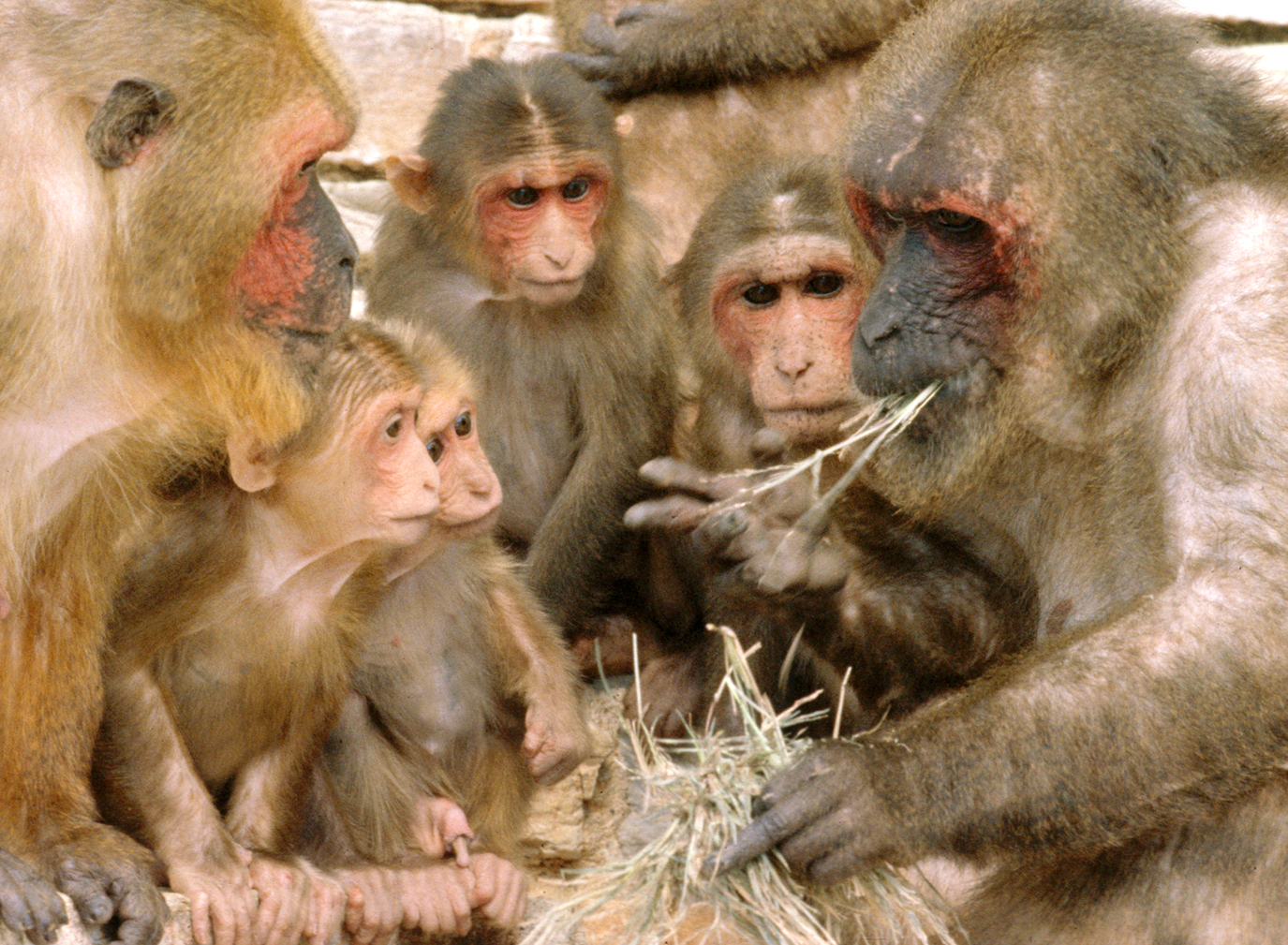
Stumptail macaques

Stump-tailed macaques share a similar social structure with other macaque species; Females tend to remain in their natal troop, males immigrate into neighbouring communities shortly before becoming sexually mature, and females form a social hierarchy based on matrilineal descent, while the hierarchy among males is more fluid and based on individual fighting ability. Compared to rhesus and long-tail macaques, stump-tails defuse intense confrontations, are relatively tolerant of group members, and have a surprisingly rich repertoire of reconciliation tactics. Females tend to be less violent to one another compared to rhesus macaque females and aggression is expressed largely through virtual threats and chases rather than actual violence. Teeth-chattering and rump bearing are submissive gestures frequently employed by stumptail macaques. After a fight, males typically hug and kiss to defuse social tension, and subordinates will present their forearm for the dominant to administer a mock bite, which does not lead to any injury. Homosexual mounting among males also occurs to sooth social tensions.

=== Reproduction ===
A study population of female stump-tailed macaques was found to have two mating seasons per year: one in summer (July–August) and one in fall (November). This is supported by the distribution of birth frequency in stump-tailed macaques. In captive settings, infanticide by a new immigrant male into an established group was observed.

== See also ==
- Britches – an infant stump-tailed macaque used in sight-deprivation experiments, which was stolen from the laboratory by the Animal Liberation Front.
- List of endangered and protected species of China
