= Modoc (novel) =

1998 book by Ralph Helfer

Modoc: The True Story of the Greatest Elephant That Ever Lived
- First edition
- Author: Ralph Helfer
- Language: English
- Genre: Biography
- Publisher: HarperCollins
- Publication date: 26 August 1998
- Publication place: United States
- Media type: Print (Paperback)
- Pages: 352 pp
- ISBN: 0-06-092951-0
- OCLC: 39955453

Modoc is a book written by American writer Ralph Helfer and published in 1998. It tells the true story of a boy and an elephant, and their fight to stay together across three continents.

== Plot summary ==
Modoc tells the true story of Bram Gunterstein (the German son of a third-generation circus animal trainer) and his pet elephant, Modoc, both born on the same day in 1896. In the novelization, Bram’s father has long wished for a boy and a girl, and quickly feels that his dream has just been fulfilled. From an early age, Bram follows in his father’s footsteps; and Bram’s family is unique in the way they train the elephants: instead of threat and intimidation, the pachyderms are treated with praise and respect. Once old enough, Modoc begins to perform in the circus. But soon, the circus owner falls ill, and the circus itself is sold to an American, Mr. North. Bram, unwilling to be parted from his beloved elephant, acts as a stowaway across the Indian Ocean.

The ship is wrecked, leaving Modoc, Mr. Pitt, Bram and others adrift in the ocean. The survivors stay afloat on Modoc’s back until help comes at the last possible second. Modoc and Bram recuperate in India, where Bram learns much about elephant training and care at the Elephantarium, as well as Indian life, before becoming a favorite “son of the Maharaja”. Afraid that Mr. North will find them, the boy and his elephant companion flee into the teak forests, and soon find themselves joining the ranks of the mahouts, among whom Bram marries a village daughter because of his newly acquired status. However, rebels eventually take over the town, killing Bram’s wife along with many of the local people.

Mr. North, the new circus owner, is inexplicably able to find Modoc and Bram through the rebellion, and transports them to America, where they become reluctant stars. Modoc survives a poisoning attempt, a fire, and a hook-wielding drunk, before the circus owner decides she is too scarred to appear in the ring and sells her without Bram's knowledge – Bram is dismayed at this news.

Ten years pass, during which Modoc’s life deteriorates into abuse, until she is finally purchased by Ralph Helfer, a Hollywood animal trainer, who nurses her back to health, and is surprised to find the variety of acts she already knows. Drawn by their supernatural connection, Bram locates her some years later. They spend the rest of their lives in constant contact at Helfer’s ranch, nursing one another through old age. In the story’s ending, Bram is the first of the pair to die, saying he is going to show Modoc the way.

== Translation ==
The novel was translated into Chinese by Zhang Haidi, and won a national prize in China for best translated works.
