= University of California, Riverside 1985 laboratory raid =

1985 animal cruelty incident

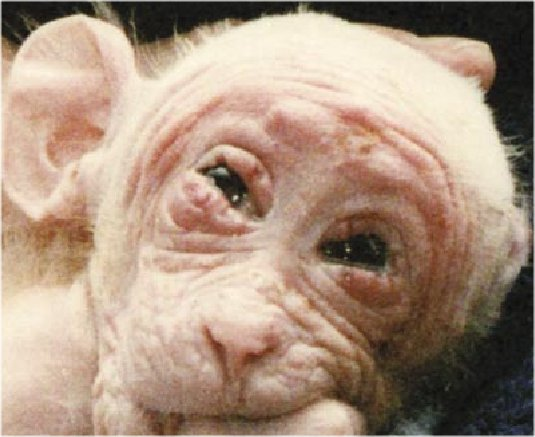
- Date: April 20, 1985
- Location: University of California, Riverside
- Participants: Animal Liberation Front (ALF)
- Property damage: $700,000, according to the university

In 1985, a raid took place at a laboratory belonging to the University of California, Riverside (UCR) that resulted in the removal of a monkey by the Animal Liberation Front (ALF). This monkey, called Britches (born March 1985), was a stump-tailed macaque who was born into a breeding colony at UCR. He was removed from his mother at birth, had his eyelids sewn shut, and had an electronic sonar device attached to his head—a Trisensor Aid, an experimental version of a blind travel aid, the Sonicguide—as part of a three-year sensory-deprivation study involving 24 infant monkeys. The experiments were designed to study the behavioral and neural development of monkeys reared with a sensory substitution device.

Acting on a tip-off from a student, the ALF removed Britches from the laboratory on April 20, 1985, when he was five weeks old. The raid also saw the release of 467 mice, cats, opossums, pigeons, rabbits, and rats, and a reported $700,000-worth of damage to equipment. A spokesman for the university said that allegations of animal mistreatment were absolutely false, and that the raid caused long-term damage to its research projects.

The ALF handed the video of their raid over to People for the Ethical Treatment of Animals (PETA), which released it. The National Institutes of Health (NIH) conducted an eight-month investigation into the animal care program at the university and concluded it was an appropriate program, and that no corrective action was necessary.

== The study ==
The study was conducted by psychologist David H. Warren. Five groups of four macaques were to be raised from birth to three months, and one group to six months, blinded while wearing a Trisensor Aid. Other control groups were to wear the device with normal vision, or wear a dummy device with no vision. At the end of the experiment, the monkeys were to be euthanized, and the visual, auditory and motor areas in their brains would be studied.

According to PETA's president Ingrid Newkirk, based on papers found in the lab by the ALF, the UCR researchers wrote that performing the study by artificially blinding the monkeys was necessary because there were insufficient numbers of blind human infants within driving distance of Riverside. The researchers did not want to conduct the study in the homes of blind children because of the difficulty of carrying out the research amid routine household chores, according to Newkirk.

== The raid ==
Newkirk writes that the ALF was alerted to the laboratory's work by a student who had reported the Britches' situation to Last Chance for Animals. An ALF contact volunteering there heard the complaint, and approached the student for more information. On April 21, 1985, ALF activists, including Sally S, a businesswoman in her mid-30s, broke into the laboratory and removed Britches along with around 467 other animals, taking footage of the raid, which they handed anonymously to PETA.

Activists say they found Britches, who was given his name by the researchers, alone in a cage with bandages around his eyes and a sonar device attached to his head. The device emitted a high-pitched noise every few minutes. He was clinging to a device covered in towelling that had two fake nipples attached, apparently intended to serve as a surrogate mother. He was handed to a female ALF volunteer who drove him from California to Utah, where he was examined by a retired pediatrician. According to UCR officials, the ALF also smashed equipment resulting in nearly $700,000 worth of damage. Theodore Hullar, UCR's executive vice chancellor, said the researchers' work had been set back years.

=== Medical report ===
Veterinarian ophthalmologist Ned Buyukmihci of the University of California, Davis, and founder of Veterinarians for Animal Rights, examined Britches and noted that the sutures used were too large, the monkey's eye pads were dirty, and that, in his view, there was no justification for what he called a sloppy, painful experiment. Bettina Flavioli, a retired pediatrician, also examined the monkey and recorded a report:

Attached to infant's head by means of bandage and tape is an apparatus of some sort with what appears to be some sort of electrical cord extending from it. It has been cut. Bilaterally are short lengths of tubing emerging from the bandage. Tape is in direct contact with the face and neck. Bandage lifted rostrally from right eye due to excessive moisture and right eye partially visible.

Beneath the bandages are two cotton pads, one for each eye ... Both pads are filthy and soaked with moisture. Bilaterally upper eyelids are sutured to lower eyelids. The sutures are grossly oversized for the purpose intended. Many of these sutures have torn through lid tissue resulting in multiple lacerations of the lids. There is an open space between upper and lower lids of both eyes of about one quarter inch, and sutures are contacting corneal tissue resulting in excessive tearing ...

Infant demonstrates photophobia. Penis of infant is edematous and inflamed. There are smegma accumulations. Generalized muscle development poor. Skin dry. Body odor foul.

== Reaction ==
PETA released a film called Britches that included footage from the raid and the ALF's treatment of the monkey afterwards. The film prompted criticism of the experiments from other scientists and the American Council of the Blind, with Dr. Grant Mack, president of the council, calling it "one of the most repugnant and ill-conceived boondoggles that I've heard about for a long time".

A UCR spokesman said allegations of animal mistreatment were "absolutely false", and that there would be long-term damage to some of the research projects. Researchers alleged that activists had applied black paint or mascara to the monkey's eyelids to make the sutures look larger than they were, and that damage reported by an ALF veterinarian to the eyelids had been caused by the veterinarian himself. The researchers also said that the Trisensor Aid had been removed and reattached by the ALF.

The raid prompted the head of the National Institutes of Health to say that thefts of laboratory animals by animal rights groups could be considered acts of terrorism, and may require enactment of federal laws. Sally Sperling, a psychologist working in the lab that was raided, told the American Psychological Association's Monitor on Psychology: "I can't describe in detail how [the lab] looked when I first saw it after the crime—the images are etched into my mind with acid ... My lab was my haven and refuge for eighteen years. Even when my experiment wasn't going well or the equipment was acting up, I wanted to be in my lab and missed it badly when I wasn't there. Now, I barely can make myself open the door."

As a result of the ensuing publicity, eight of the 17 studies interrupted by the raid were not restarted, and the university stopped allowing infant monkeys' eyes to be sewn shut, according to reports filed by the university with the government. The NIH conducted an eight-month investigation into the animal care program at UC-Riverside and concluded it was an "appropriate" program, and that no corrective action was necessary. A primatologist arranged for the monkey to be socialized by a number of handlers. When he was five months old, he was flown to a sanctuary in Texas, where he was given to an elderly female macaque who had already raised several orphans. Britches lived to be 20 years old at the Primarily Primates sanctuary in San Antonio which takes care of primates formerly used in experiments.

== See also ==
- Neuroplasticity
- List of individual monkeys
