= California National Primate Research Center =

Biomedical research facility in California, US

The California National Primate Research Center (CNPRC) is a federally funded biomedical research facility, dedicated to improving human and animal health, and located on the University of California, Davis, campus. The CNPRC is part of a network of seven National Primate Research Centers developed to breed, house, care for and study primates for medical and behavioral research. Opened in 1962, researchers at this secure facility have investigated many diseases, ranging from asthma and Alzheimer's disease to AIDS and other infectious diseases, and has also produced discoveries about autism. CNPRC currently houses about 4,700 monkeys, the majority of which are rhesus macaques, with a small population of South American titi monkeys. The center, located on 300 acres (1.2 km^{2}) 2.5 miles west of the UC Davis campus, is sponsored by the National Institutes of Health (NIH).

== Research program ==
Scientists using the center's facilities produce numerous papers annually detailing their investigations into human health issues. The center's research units are focused on four primary topics: Brain, mind, and behavior; infectious diseases; reproductive sciences and regenerative medicine; and respiratory diseases.

== Outreach ==
Through their Affiliate and Pilot Research program, CNPRC supports visiting scientists by providing access to facilities and equipment. Similarly, the Center aids off-site researchers with veterinary services from in-house professionals.

As with most federally funded research institutions, CNPRC provides educational outreach programs to the local community. They invite local elementary school students to learn about the research and animals through a standardized two-hour program. Children and their teachers learn some basics of primate biology, and about some of the primate-based biomedical research that is performed at the center. Furthermore, the Center provides resources to elementary science teachers to promote biology, particularly primate biology and behavior, instruction.

== Incidents and controversies ==
The California NPRC has been criticized for a number of issues related to its care of monkeys including several violations of the Animal Welfare Act (AWA) that have resulted in the deaths of over a dozen animals in recent years.

In 2009 an outbreak of a monkey-killing cold virus identified as an adenovirus infected both monkeys and humans, with the sickness killing about a third of the 65 titi monkeys there. Only four of the 23 sick monkeys survived the illness.

In 2013 a monkey was crushed by his cage door and in 2011 another monkey accidentally strangled himself with a bungee cord left in his cage. The center was cited by the USDA for AWA violations for failing to provide veterinary care to 19 monkeys who subsequently died between 2010 and 2009. In 2004 the center was fined by the USDA after seven monkeys died after the building overheated. Federal inspectors have also noted that as many as 50 monkeys were at times able to escape their enclosures. Critics of the center — who have called for the laboratory to be closed— say that the animals are treated poorly, subjected to cruel experiments and that more than 2,000 monkeys are kept in small indoor cages for their entire lives. The university has defended their care of the animals and the use of monkeys in medical experimentation. According to the center's director, "To abandon primate research now would be the biggest hindrance to…medicine" claiming that the animals are needed for the development of new treatments for illnesses, a claim critics of the center dispute.

In May 2014, the USDA reported that a protocol for non-human primates contained an incomplete description of a surgical procedure to implant medical devices into the animals.

In August 2014, a male macaque was left on a restrain board while receiving intravenous fluid. The macaque chewed through the tape restraining his upper body which left his legs taped to the board, which caused his leg to be broken. The USDA reported that staff is required to check restraints every 15 minutes but it was not clear if the restraints had been checked appropriately.

In March 2016, a macaque escaped through an enclosure door which staff had failed to secure and subsequently broke both of its legs.

In June 2016, a macaque escaped its transport enclosure. Staff tranquilized the macaque and later euthanized it.

In August 2016, CNPRC staff failed to secure a divider door between two non-compatible macaques. The two macaques fought and were both injured. One macaque sustained significant injuries and was euthanized.

In November 2016, the USDA reported that the CNPRC had improperly stored food for non-human primates.

The research center was the site of this outbreak in what is being considered the first known case of an adenovirus jumping from monkeys to humans.

There is a growing evidence of the contribution of CNPRC to the origins of simian immunodeficiency virus (SIV). Evidence from the full length sequences has shown formation of a distinct cluster of SIVmac (the SIV strain that infect the old world monkeys in Asia) within HIV-2 and SIVmac phylogeny. It has been suggested that these monkeys could have been infected at CNPRC by captive Sooty Mangabey.

From 2017 to 2020, UC Davis worked with neurotechnology company Neuralink to test brain-machine interfaces on monkeys. In 2022, the Physicians Committee for Responsible Medicine (PCRM) alleged that Neuralink and UC Davis had mistreated several monkeys, subjecting them to psychological distress, extreme suffering, and chronic infections due to surgeries. Experiments conducted by Neuralink and UC Davis have involved at least 23 monkeys, and the PCRM believes that 15 of those monkeys died or were euthanized as a result of the experiments. Furthermore, the PCRM alleged that UC Davis withheld photographic and video evidence of the mistreatment.

== See also ==
- David Amaral
- Yerkes National Primate Research Center
