= Wisconsin National Primate Research Center =

Biomedical research facility at the University of Wisconsin-Madison

- WNPRC
- Location: 1220 Capitol Court, Madison, Wisconsin, 53715; 43°4′7″N 89°24′25″W
- Website: primate.wisc.edu
- Location within Wisconsin

The Wisconsin National Primate Research Center (WNPRC) is a federally funded biomedical research facility located at the University of Wisconsin-Madison. The WNPRC is part of a network of seven National Primate Research Centers which conduct biomedical research on primates. As of 2020, the center houses approximately 1,600 animals.

== Research ==
The WNPRC describes its mission to involve researching human diseases, studying primate biology, providing "expertise, resources and training" to scientists, and disseminating information about the center. In 2020, the center consisted of 1,600 animals, 190 employees, and 190 trainees.

== Incidents and controversies ==
=== 1960s and 1970s ===
During the 1960s and 1970s, psychologist Harry Harlow led experiments at the WNPRC in which young monkeys were subjected to social isolation, causing the monkeys to experience severe emotional distress. As part of his experiments, Harlow developed a device called the "pit of despair", which was an isolation chamber where young monkeys were kept for up to ten weeks.

=== 2010–2014 ===
In June 2012, a seven-month-old macaque died after its head was caught between a support bar and enclosure.

In July 2014, a USDA inspection report revealed that since January 1, 2013, there had been 36 incidents of non-human primates escaping from their enclosures. Five of these incidents involved significant injuries to the animals which required surgery or primary closure of wounds. Furthermore, many of these escapes were the result of human errors such as incorrectly closing or securing enclosures.

In February 2013, a five-year-old marmoset was killed as the result of improper use of an anesthesia machine by a veterinary technician.

In October 2013, a macaque sustained a thermal injury after a heat lamp, which was intended to warm the animal, malfunctioned.

In June 2014, a two-year-old macaque died after her head was caught in a chain her cage.

In 2014, psychiatrist Ned Kalin was approved for experiments in which newborn monkeys were to be separated from their mothers, subjected to anxiety-inducing tests, and then euthanized. Kalin's experiments sparked outrage and condemnation, and a petition against Kalin's experiments was signed by over 290,000 people.

In July 2014, a USDA inspection report revealed that since July 2014, there had been two incidents of non-human primates escaping their cages due to technician error, which resulted in the animals experiencing injuries which required amputation and closure of wounds. The same report revealed that there had been three incidents of animal mis-pairing due to technician error, which resulted in injuries and wounds to the animals.

=== 2015–2019 ===
In January 2016, a USDA inspection report revealed that there had been 12 incidents of primates escaping their enclosures. Nine of these cases were due to human error, and three were due to enclosure hardware failure. After their escape, many primates were injured after interacting with other primates. Some of these injuries involved primates losing portions of their tongues, and some required sutures and/or digit amputations.

In December 2015, it was discovered that a drinking water supply line for three rhesus macaques had been disconnected for one to four days. The animals were given IV fluid therapy. After the therapy, two of the animals recovered, but the third did not and was euthanized.

In June 2018, a USDA inspection report revealed that since November 2016, there had been four incidents of macaques escaping their enclosures due to human error or enclosure failure. After escaping, the macaques interacted with other macaques and sustained injuries, which required sutures and/or digit amputation.

In October and November 2017, a marmoset got its foot closed on by an enclosure door on two occasions. As a result, the animal's foot was injured and required digit amputations.

In February and March 2019, primates escaped their enclosures after locks were improperly installed. After their escape, the animals interacted with other primates and sustained injuries. Some of the injuries required surgical repair including sutures, digit amputation, and tongue loss.

In July 2019, a USDA inspection report revealed that as the result of a handling procedure, a marmoset had sustained a femur fracture that required amputation.

=== 2020–present ===
In February 2021, a marmoset sustained a foot injury after a door was accidentally closed on its foot. The injury required multiple surgeries and digit amputations.

In August 2021, the USDA reported seven incidents over the past two years due to improper handling by the staff, which caused injuries to multiple primates. The affected primates sustained injuries including partial loss of their tongues, tail injuries, injuries which required digit amputation, and wounds that required sutures. Most injuries were due to interactions between primates after not being properly contained. Of the seven incidents, three were caused by the staff's improper use of locks, and four were caused by the staff's improper use of transport boxes.
