= Tulane National Biomedical Research Center =

Biomedical research facility in Covington, Louisiana

The Tulane National Biomedical Research Center (TNBRC) is a federally funded biomedical research facility affiliated with Tulane University. The TNBRC is one of seven National Primate Research Centers which conduct biomedical research on primates. The TNBRC is situated in 500 acres of land in Covington, Louisiana, and originally opened as the Delta Regional Primate Center in 1964. On October 9, 2025 the center changed its name from Tulane National Primate Research Center to Tulane National Biomedical Research Center to represent a broadened scope of research. The center uses five types of non-human primates in its research: cynomolgus macaques, African green monkeys, mangabeys, pig-tailed macaques and rhesus macaques. The TNBRC employs over three hundred people and has an estimated economic impact of $107.1 million a year.

== Research ==
The TNBRC has four divisions: Comparative Pathology, Microbiology, Immunology, and Veterinary Medicine. The center investigates diseases including HIV/AIDS, celiac disease, Krabbe disease, leukemia, Lyme disease, respiratory syncytial virus (RSV), rotavirus, SARS-CoV-2, tuberculosis, varicella zoster virus (VZV), and Zika virus.

== Facilities ==
The TNBRC is located on more than 500 acres of land, in unincorporated St. Tammany Parish, Louisiana, with a Covington, Louisiana postal address. In addition to its research facilities, the center has an on-site, 40,000-square-foot (3,700 m^{2}) Biosafety Level 3 biocontainment laboratory. The TNBRC also operates a large breeding colony of non-human primates.

== Breeding colony ==
The TNBRC operates an on-site breeding colony of 5,000 non-human primates.

== Incidents and controversies ==
In Animal Underworld: Inside America's Black Market for Rare and Exotic Species, reporter Alan Green and the Center for Public Integrity described Tulane's primate research center as “the worst" facility "in its disregard of the spirit of the nation’s endangered species laws.” Green's book describes, for example, the TNBRC mishandling of a troupe of endangered mangabeys. But the center has a number of other problematic incidents. In 1998, two dozen rhesus macaques escaped from their cage into the surrounding area of the TNBRC.

In 2005, over 50 monkeys escaped from their cage into the surrounding area of the TNBRC. Four of the primates died or were never found.

In 2006, thirteen baboons were killed after being placed in a crowded chute.

In September 2012, a rhesus macaque was inadvertently left in an unattended vehicle for approximately 22 hours. As a result, the macaque was dehydrated and later died.

In September 2014, a USDA inspection report revealed that several of the animal cages had been kept in unclean and unsanitary conditions.

In November 2014, three macaques in the TNBRC's breeding colony were affected by a biosecurity breach due to staff members not following proper procedure. As a result, the animals were euthanized.

In September 2015, a USDA inspection revealed that personnel at the TNBRC were not following appropriate procedures regarding the criteria for euthanizing animals.

On October 28, 2025, a truck containing 21 monkeys housed at Tulane crashed on an Interstate in Mississippi, freeing 8 caged animals, who escaped. The truck driver told authorities on the scene that the macaques were carriers of hepatitus, herpes, and COVID, and several of the escaped animals were shot and killed. Tulane officials denied that the animals were diseased and said in a statement that the monkeys did not belong to the university, and were not being transported by the university.
