= Ralph Helfer =

American ethologist (born 1931)

Ralph Helfer (born April 9, 1931) is an American ethologist, creator of Marine World/Africa USA, and author of books about animals.

== Early years ==
Hefler was born in Chicago, Illinois and had one sister, Sally. In 1942, his mother left her husband Sam and moved with her children to Hollywood, where they settled in the Green Apartments, one block off Hollywood Boulevard.

== Career ==
In 1955, Hefler purchased the 1,500-acre (6.1 km^{2}) Vasquez Rocks property to train animals, which he called Nature's Haven. He married Toni Ringo in 1963. They had a daughter, Tana Helfer. In 1963, the property was cut in half by the Antelope Valley Freeway, so they relocated to Soledad Canyon and bought 600 acres (2.4 km^{2}) of land to build a new ranch, naming it Africa U.S.A. Africa U.S.A. was a training compound and a provider of animals for Hollywood. Some of its animals were Clarence, the cross-eyed lion; Judy, the chimp in Daktari; and Ben (originally named Bruno), the bear in Gentle Ben. The compound was also used as a location for shows such as Daktari and the original Star Trek episode "Shore Leave". Helfer trained Zamba, who appeared in the MGM logo as Leo the Lion from 1957 to the present.

During these years, Helfer created what he called "affection training", which purported to replace the whip, gun, and chair of the old-school handlers with love, understanding, and respect.

In January 1969, Africa U.S.A. was devastated by a powerful storm over Soledad Canyon which severely flooded the region and caused mudslides in the canyons. 20 of the 1,500 animals of the ranch were killed by the torrential flooding.

Helfer bought out Marine World in 1972 when it went bankrupt and added a wildlife park and "jungle theater", renaming the park as Marine World/Africa U.S.A. This park was the predecessor of Six Flags Discovery Kingdom. He also was a partner and chairman of a small theme park in Buena Park, California called Enchanted Village, built on the site of the defunct Japanese Village and Deer Park amusement attraction. When this park went bankrupt in 1977, he created another company and training park called "Gentle Jungle". The Gentle Jungle Affection Training School was based in Colton, California and later in Lion Country Safari, in Orange County. Gentle Jungle was investigated by the USDA, resulting in an eventual lawsuit against Helfer for Animal Welfare Act violations. During this period, he owned the "human" chimp Oliver. Helfer was cleared of all accusations except one concerning the death of a tiger due to an overdose by the veterinarian, not Helfer. The matter was supposed to go to the Supreme Court, but never did. Helfer left the business because of the imminent financial pressure of the suit.

=== Media ===
In 1981, Helfer wrote and produced the adventure film Savage Harvest.

In the 1990s, Hefler began a successful career as a writer. Most of his books are nonfiction life stories of noted animals. He now lives in Los Angeles and Kenya, where he leads safari tours with his company Eden International Safaris and Treks.

== Bibliography ==
- The Beauty of the Beasts - J.P. Tarcher - 1990 - ISBN 0-87477-516-7
- Modoc - HarperCollins - 1998 - ISBN 0-06-092951-0
- Mosey - Orchard - 2002 - ISBN 0-439-29313-8
- Zamba - HarperCollins - 2005 - ISBN 0-06-076132-6
