= Washington National Primate Research Center =

Research facility

The Washington National Primate Research Center (WaNPRC) is a federally-funded biomedical research facility located on the Seattle campus of the University of Washington. The WaNPRC is one of seven National Primate Research Centers established by the National Institutes of Health in the 1960s The Washington primate center opened in 1961 and as of 2020, housed over 900 primates. The center is affiliated with the University of Washington Schools of Medicine, Public Health, affiliated research centers and the University of Washington Medical Center. It employs over 150 scientists and staff.

As of February 2026, the center changed its official name to the Washington National Biomedical Research Center (WaNBRC) to "better reflect the work conducted by the center".

== Administration ==
The Warren G. Magnuson Health Sciences Center on the Seattle campus of the University of Washington serves as the headquarters for the WaNPRC. The current director of the WaNPRC is Dr. Michele A. Basso, Professor in Biostructure and Physiology and Biophysics at the University of Washington School of Medicine. In addition to leading the center, Dr. Basso is also a neuroscientist who conducts research seeking fundamental mechanisms underlying neurological diseases with a special interest in Parkinson's disease and dystonia.

== Research Facilities and Staff ==
In addition to its facilities on the University of Washington's Seattle campus, the WaNPRC leases facilities in the South Lake Union and Belltown neighborhoods of Seattle. Research at the center is conducted by a group of core staff scientists many of whom are also University of Washington faculty members. Core scientists at the center represent a variety of university departments. These include bioengineering, biological structure, electrical engineering, global health, immunology, laboratory medicine, medical genetics, microbiology, obstetrics & gynecology, oncology, pathology, pharmaceutics, physiology & biophysics, and psychology. Over 400 affiliate scientists also conduct research at the center. Collectively, these individuals conduct biomedical research in a wide variety of areas including:

- Neuroscience
- Infectious diseases including, HIV/AIDS, SARS CoV-2, Zika, malaria and influenza research
- Reproductive science and women's health
- Genomics, gene therapy and regenerative medicine
- Immunogenetics
- Primate conservation
- The psychological well-being needs of nonhuman primates housed in captivity

== Breeding colonies ==
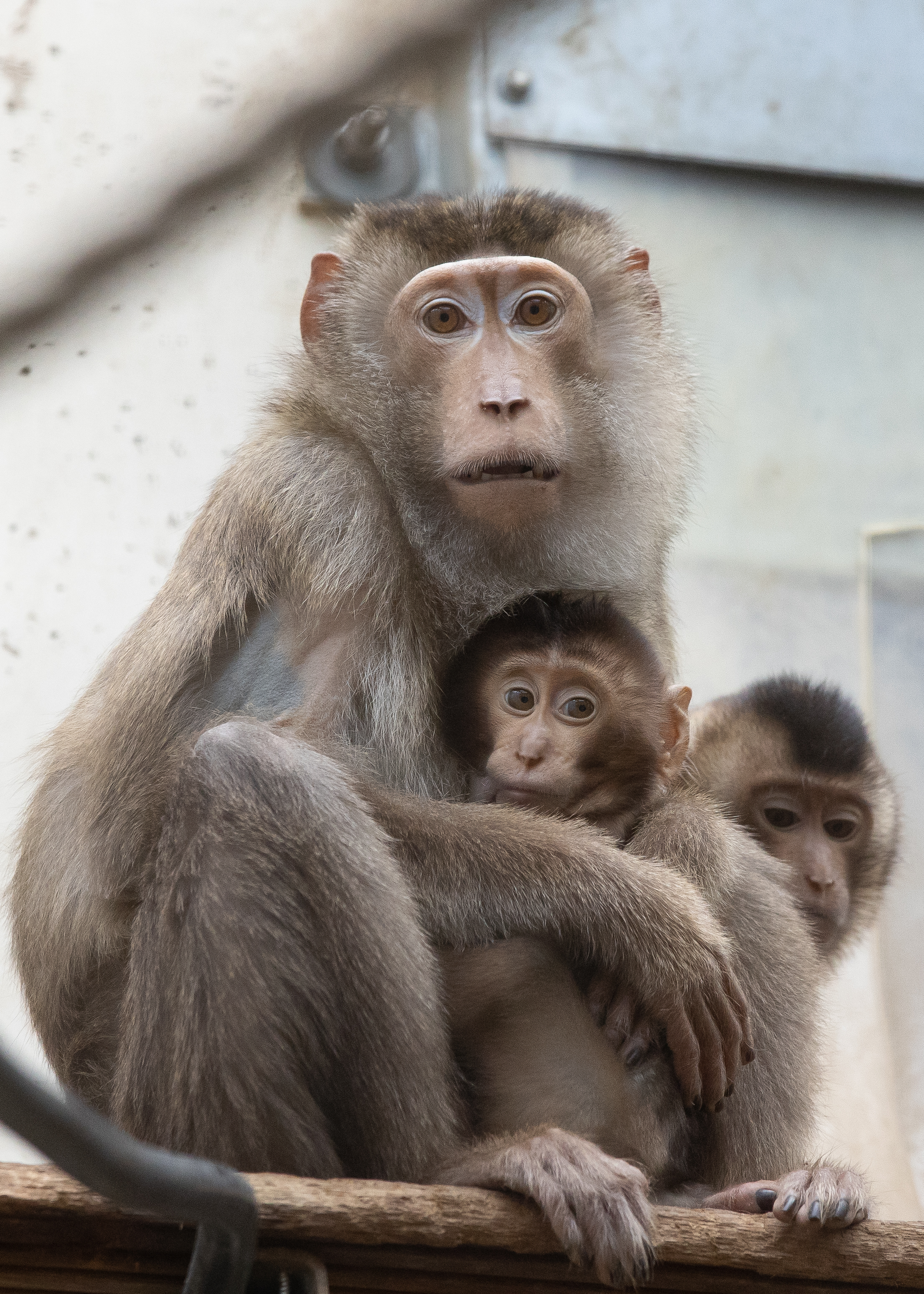
Macaques are the most common type of non-human primates used at the WaNPRC.

The WaNPRC breeds monkeys in their Seattle facility and maintains an off-site breeding colony near Mesa, Arizona. This “specific pathogen free” breeding colony of pigtail macaques was established in 2013. This is an Indoor/outdoor facility housing compound with support facilities located on 21 acres of Tribal Land belonging to the Salt River Pima–Maricopa Indian Community. From 1966 through 1996, UW operated a Primate Field Station in Medical Lake, WA, in a former maximum-security prison building at Eastern State Hospital.

== Oversight, Events, Issues and Responses ==
Animal studies at the center are regulated by a variety of agencies and organizations. The WaNPRC is inspected at least annually by the USDA's Animal and Plant Health Inspection Service. Studies are covered by regulations required by the National Institutes of Health and the primate center is accredited by AAALAC international, a private, nonprofit organization that promotes the humane treatment of animals in science through voluntary accreditation and assessment programs. The primate center also self-reports to the NIH Office of Animal Laboratory Welfare when unexpected incidents that impact animals occur. Below is a list of incidents at the center, including incidents that led to animal deaths, along with responses by the USDA (citations, fines) and university responses.

=== 1990s ===
Between 1990 and 1995, approximately eighteen primates died from dehydration at the center's facility in Medical Lake, WA. According to a news story in the Seattle Times, between 1990 and 1994, death rates of animals from non-experimental causes at the Medical Lake breeding facility were twice the rate from simple aging. According to that same article, at one point one working veterinarian was responsible for the care of 1,500 primates. In 1996 the Medical Lake station closed. Primates living at the facility were moved to Louisiana, Oregon, and Seattle.

=== 2000s ===
- In 2008, a public records request by People for the Ethical Treatment of Animals revealed researchers had performed 41 surgeries on a group of 14 monkeys that were not previously approved.
- In 2010, The Seattle Times reported that a primate had starved to death in UW's facility in 2009. The incident resulted in a USDA fine of $10,893. In the same article, the Seattle Times reported “the UW has spent millions to upgrade animal-care facilities and is now fully accredited by the Association for Assessment and Accreditation of Laboratory Animal Care.”

=== 2010s ===
- Between May and June 2013, there were three separate incidents of young macaques being attacked by adult macaques. One of the animals died as a result of the attack. The other two were humanely euthanized due to the seriousness of their injuries.
- In July 2015, a USDA inspection revealed that the center's Institutional Animal Care and Use Committee (IACUC) had approved three protocols with incomplete descriptions, one of which led to three primates having severe health issues and having to be euthanized. The first protocol involved surgical incisions, but did not provide information about the length or location of the incisions. The second protocol involved skull, arm, and vertebral implants, but lacked information about the size and location of the incisions, as well as what type of instrumentation was to be implanted. As a result, three of the primates used in this protocol had severe health issues and had to be euthanized. The third protocol involved skull implants, but lacked a description of the size and locations of the implants. It was noted in the report that one primate in this study had been subjected to surgery on a large portion of its skull, and as a result, the animal's eyebrow appeared to be depressed.
- On December 12, 2016, a primate died under anesthesia during an experimental MRI-related procedure. According to USDA records, “The animal was monitored by research staff; however, no anesthetic monitoring records were maintained during this procedure.” The incident was self-reported by the university.
- On January 8, 2017, an 8-year-old female pigtail macaque died of dehydration as the result of the water line in its cage being disconnected for two to three days. Animal husbandry logs indicated that twice daily checks had been performed every day prior to the incident to ensure the drinking hoses were functioning properly and food consumption logs had been normal. The incident was self-reported by the university.
- In April 2018, a pigtail macaque accidentally asphyxiated using a chain adjacent to its cage. The involved enrichment device had not been properly installed. The facility self-reported the incident to NIH and OLAW officials. To prevent a similar incident in the future, the university determined all enrichment devices will be evaluated by a committee before being used with animals.
- In 2019, a primate died during surgery. According to a USDA inspector “The surgery was uneventful; however, the animal went into respiratory arrest during the recovery period which lead to the need for CPR and re-intubation. During CPR, the animal was seen to vomit, and ingesta was aspirated. The animal was revived and appeared to be recovering but arrested again later and died.” The incident was self-reported by the university to regulatory agencies.
- In 2019, a drug vial was found to be diluted, which resulted in a primate possibly receiving less than the recommended dose of analgesic. The animal did receive other pain relievers and did not appear to be in pain during that time and recovered uneventfully. The incident was self–reported to regulatory agencies. Additionally, an inspection discovered that a controlled drug cabinet had been left open and unattended.

=== 2020s ===
- In January 2021, the USDA reported that a macaque had accidentally been left in a trapping run for 12 hours, without access to food or water. Although the staff looked in the trapping run, they did not see the animal. The macaque was moderately dehydrated, given immediate treatment, and had recovered by the next day. The incident was self-reported by the university.
- In January 2021, the USDA reported that a macaque broke the locks between two cages and escaped into a room, which resulted in injuries to seven primates. All of the impacted animals were treated by the attending veterinarian and recovered from their injuries. The incident was self-reported by the university.
- In August 2021, the USDA reported the temperature in a room containing 14 macaques was occasionally 5 to 7 degrees above normal highs over the course of several days. When the temperature deviation was identified, animal technicians opened inside doors and placed fans to provide increased air circulation. The HVAC unit was reset and functioned normally after the reset.
- In August 2021, the USDA reported that a building containing over 200 macaques had a significant amount of rodent feces in the ceiling lights and on the floor in many locations. Staff reported they were aware of the problem and had taken steps to combat the issue. The facility installed door sweeps, live traps, and put foam around the foundation of the building.
- According to a media report in 2023, the WaNPRC reported a monkey had been injured while inserting a recording device into the animal's brain. In response, the university conducted a full review and instituted training protocol changes to avoid future accidents. The involved animal recovered and was moved to social housing. The incident was self-reported by the university.

== 2021 Investigations by The Arizona Republic ==
=== Investigations ===
In October 2021, Rob O'Dell of The Arizona Republic published four reports based on a seven-month investigation into the WaNPRC's Arizona breeding facility. The investigations revealed several issues with the lab, including high rates of valley fever among macaques, chemically tainted water supplies, administrational problems at the center including a sexual harassment scandal, and the center having broken laws in transporting the macaques.

The first report from The Arizona Republic revealed that monkeys had been getting sick and dying from valley fever at high rates. The University of Washington said that at least 47 monkeys had died of valley fever over the past eight years. Experts from the University of Arizona and University of Washington said that when studying viruses such as HIV, experimenting on monkeys infected with valley fever can bias or ruin the results. The investigation also revealed that the center has had high mortality rates due to valley fever, and had to kill 18 monkeys in the fourth quarter of 2014 because of valley fever. Furthermore, mortality rates for infants was even higher, and was over 40% in the fourth quarter of 2018.

The second investigation by The Arizona Republic revealed that the monkeys' water supply at the breeding facility in Arizona, which comes from groundwater wells at the site, had been contaminated with lead, perchlorate, and other chemicals. These chemicals had been leached into the water from nearby defense contractor Nammo. Perchlorate affects hormone production and can cause improper brain development in infants.

The third investigation by The Arizona Republic revealed several administrational problems at the WaNPRC, including a sexual harassment scandal. Many of the problems were brought to attention by a 2018 review by the center's National Scientific Advisory Board (NSAB). The NSAB review said that the center was inadequately staffed, and had four different associate directors in eight years. Furthermore, it said that the center's Seattle campus did not have enough veterinary staff. The NSAB also claimed the center had low morale, partly due to a sexual harassment scandal involving Michael Katze, a division chief at the WaNPRC who was fired for harassing two of his employees. Katze's offenses included giving one employee money and gifts in exchange for sex, touching another employee, watching pornography at work, and frequently using profanity. The NSAB's report resulted in the National Institutes of Health restricting spending on some grant until the center responded to the NSAB's concerns. The Arizona Republic report also described how the center also recently hired Michele A. Basso as its new director, whose research had been suspended at the University of Wisconsin in 2009 due to poor methodology. More specifically, the University of Wisconsin's All Campus Animal Care and Use Committee said that Basso was uncooperative with veterinary staff, and often followed poor procedure, for example by inserting unsterilized materials into brain tissue, and having difficulties with some procedures. However, Basso denied wrongdoing and was supported by many of the University of Wisconsin's faculty. The Arizona Republic report also discussed financial problems at the center.

The fourth investigation by The Arizona Republic revealed that UW had failed to notify the Washington Department of Agriculture that several of its primates being transported from its breeding facility in Arizona to their lab in Washington had valley fever, which has been rampant in the breeding facility. Additionally, UW had broken several laws as it failed to provide both certificates of veterinary inspection as well as entry permits for many of the primates being transported. Furthermore, it was revealed that UW hadn't obtained entry permits for transported primates since 2014.

=== Response ===
In December 2021, the NIH Office of Laboratory Animal Welfare (OLAW) started an investigation of UW's breeding facility in Arizona as a result of The Arizona Republic investigations and a complaint filed by PETA.

In 2022, Rob O'Dell's reporting won the Ann Cottrell Free Animal Reporting Award from the National Press Club.

== PETA Public Records Lawsuit ==
In 2020, PETA filed a public records lawsuit against the University of Washington, alleging that the university refused to turn over records at the WaNPRC. During the court proceedings, the former director of the lab and experimenters testified under oath that they routinely deleted data from the lab. In 2022, the King County Superior Court ruled in favor of PETA, and ordered UW to pay nearly $540,000 to PETA. The court concluded that the university failed to perform a sufficient search for records, and consistently destroyed evidence which made it impossible for the school to comply with public records law.

== Prominent Criticism ==
In August 2022, five members of the United States Congress wrote a letter to the Director of the National Institutes of Health, Lawrence A. Tabak, asking for an explanation as to why the WaNPRC was recently awarded a $65 million grant despite "serious ethical concerns and noncompliance issues" at the center.

In October 2022, New Jersey senator Cory Booker wrote a letter to the Secretary of the US Department of Health and Human Services, Xavier Becerra, asking him to investigate why the WaNPRC's base operational funding grant was renewed, despite multiple issues with the center, including failure to maintain biosecurity, repeated animal welfare violations, financial issues, and failure to comply with state and federal laws. In his letter, Booker referenced revelations from the 2021 investigations by the Arizona Republic and the 2022 PETA lawsuit.

== See also ==
- Animal testing at the University of Washington
