= Geoffrey H. Bourne =

Australian-American anatomist and primatologist

- Born: 17 November 1909
- Died: 19 July 1988 (aged 78)
- Education: University of Oxford; D.Sc., 1935; Ph.D., 1943
- Known for: adrenal gland histochemistry and cell biology primatology
- Scientific career
- Fields: anatomy and primatology
- Workplaces: Yerkes National Primate Research Center; Emory University

Geoffrey Howard Bourne (17 November 1909 – 19 July 1988) was an Australian-American anatomist and primatologist. In particular, he studied the adrenal gland, conducting pioneering work in histochemistry.

Bourne was director of Yerkes National Primate Research Center at Emory University from 1962 until 1978. Prior to coming to Emory he had taught histology at the University of London and physiology at Oxford University. He received his doctorates from Oxford University (D.Sc., 1935; Ph.D., 1943) and was a fellow of the Royal Society of Medicine. Dr. Bourne, was also a professor, and vice chancellor of St. Georges University School of Medicine, in Grenada.

== Bibliography ==
- (ed.) (1942) Cytology and Cell Physiology
- (1949) The Mammalian Adrenal Gland
- (1956) Biochemistry and Physiology of Bone
- (1957) Vitamin C in the Animal Cell
- (ed.) (1961) Physiological and Pathological Aging
- (1962) Structure and Function of Muscle
- (1970) Ape People
- (1974a) Non-Human Primates and Medical Research
- (1974b) Primate Odyssey
- (1975) The Gentle Giants: The Gorilla Story
- (ed.) (1977) Human and Veterinary Nutrition
- (ed.) (1988) Sociological and Medical Aspects of Nutrition

== Notes ==
- "Dr. Geoffrey Bourne". Nature. 231 (5297): 66. May 1971. Bibcode:1971Natur.231Q..66.. doi:10.1038/231066c0. PMID 4930483.
- "Geoffrey Bourne". Lancet. 2 (7687): 1369–1370. December 1970. doi:10.1016/s0140-6736(70)92404-9. ISSN 0140-6736. PMID 4098948.
