= Southwest National Primate Research Center =

Biomedical research facility in Texas

The Southwest National Primate Research Center (SNPRC) is a federally funded biomedical research facility affiliated with the Texas Biomedical Research Institute. The SNPRC became the seventh National Primate Research Center in 1999.

== Research ==
The SNPRC has two scientific units: "Infectious Diseases Immunology & Control" and "Comparative Medicine & Health Outcomes". The SNPRC also has a Laboratory Core Services Division, which consists of three laboratories: immunology, research imaging, and pathology.

== Primates in captivity ==
The center houses over 2,500 non-human primates. Among the primates held in captivity at the SNPRC are baboons, chimpanzees, common marmosets, and rhesus macaques. The center houses over 1,000 baboons, which makes it the world's largest colony of baboons used for biomedical research. Furthermore, the center sells primates from their colonies to other researchers.

== Incidents and controversies ==
=== 2014 ===
In 2014, a male baboon was injured in its cage and died after its injuries were uncared for. The injuries went unreported and the baboon went uncared for several days after. As a result, the baboon was emaciated, developed scabs and a large abscess on its leg, and also contracted blood poisoning from which he died.

In 2014, a macaque was placed in a new group of other macaques, and sustained several severe injuries during the following year including a tail degloving injury and multiple lacerations to the face and body. A veterinarian recommended that the group be assessed by the facility behavior team, but no assessment was ever conducted.

In 2014, the USDA cited the SNPRC for inaccuracies on their 2013 annual report. More specifically, the SNPRC did not accurately report the number of animals which had pain or distress that did not have anesthetic, analgesics or tranquilizing drugs administered.

In 2014, a juvenile baboon was killed when a guillotine door fell on the animal.

=== 2015 ===
In 2015, a USDA inspection found that one research protocol contained incomplete descriptions of methods for hand rearing and euthanizing neonatal animals.

In 2015, the USDA cited the SNPRC for three instances of negligence. The first instance involved the center having a supply of numerous outdated drugs and medical supplies. The second instance involved several bags of food enrichment items being left open, which may have allowed contamination and/or deterioration of the food. The third instance involved a large amount of cockroaches living in a primate housing area.

In 2015, there were two incidents in which baboons were injured or killed, which were due to errors made by employees at the SNPRC. In one incident, a female baboon was injured after three male baboons gained access to here chute system. In the second incident, a male baboon gained access to a chute containing a female and her infant, attacked the two, and killed the infant.

=== 2016 ===
In 2016, a USDA inspection revealed several instances of negligence and breaches of protocol at the SNPRC. In one instance, researchers had failed to use the approved scoring sheet and euthanasia criteria for a particular study. In another instance, the center had used 45 more animals in two studies than they had been approved for. In yet another instance, the USDA found that the SNPRC's 2015 annual report was missing information regarding the standards and regulations for the sanitation of primate enclosures and the feeding of primates. In another instance, it was revealed that animals in some studies may have experienced unrelieved pain or distress prior to euthanasia.

=== 2017 ===
In 2017, a baboon received second-degree burns from an exposed heating pipe in its cage.

In 2017, a USDA inspection report revealed deteriorating and unmaintained conditions in some of the primate cages. More specifically, some surfaces were deteriorating and paint was eroding from one of the walls.

In 2017, two macaques sustained injuries after they opened a divider between their enclosures and comingled. This incident was the fault of a caretaker who failed to secure the latch on the divider.

=== 2018 ===
In April 2018, four baboons escaped from the SNPRC but were later recaptured.

=== 2019 ===
In 2019, a macaque sustained an injury to her finger after sticking it in a hole in her enclosure. As a result, the macaque's finger had to be amputated. Staff at the SNPRC were aware of the risk of the hole in the enclosure, but did not take protections against it on that day.

In 2019, a marmoset was severely injured and then euthanized after another marmoset gained access to its cage.

In 2019, a USDA inspection report revealed several instances of unclean and deteriorating conditions at the center. For example, the report described dirty light fixtures, peeling paint, damaged dry wall, and damaged edge of a counter.

=== 2021 ===
In 2021, a USDA inspectors reported that the walls to numerous animal enclosures had peeling paint, which makes the walls difficult to properly sanitize.

== See also ==
- Texas Biomedical Research Institute
