= Humanzee =

Humanzee Hypothetical chimpanzee–human hybrid

Scientific classification
- Kingdom: Animalia
- Phylum: Chordata
- Class: Mammalia
- Order: Primates
- Superfamily: Hominoidea
- Family: Hominidae
- Subfamily: Homininae
- Tribe: Hominini
- Hybrid: Homo sapiens × Pan troglodytes

Hypothetical hybrid species

The humanzee (sometimes chuman, manpanzee or chumanzee) is a hypothetical hybrid of chimpanzee and human, thus a form of human-nonhuman hybrid. Serious attempts to create such a hybrid were made by Soviet biologist Ilya Ivanovich Ivanov in the 1920s, and possibly by researchers in China in the 1960s; however, neither succeeded.

== Etymology ==
The portmanteau humanzee for a human–chimpanzee hybrid appears to have entered usage in the 1980s.

== Possibility ==
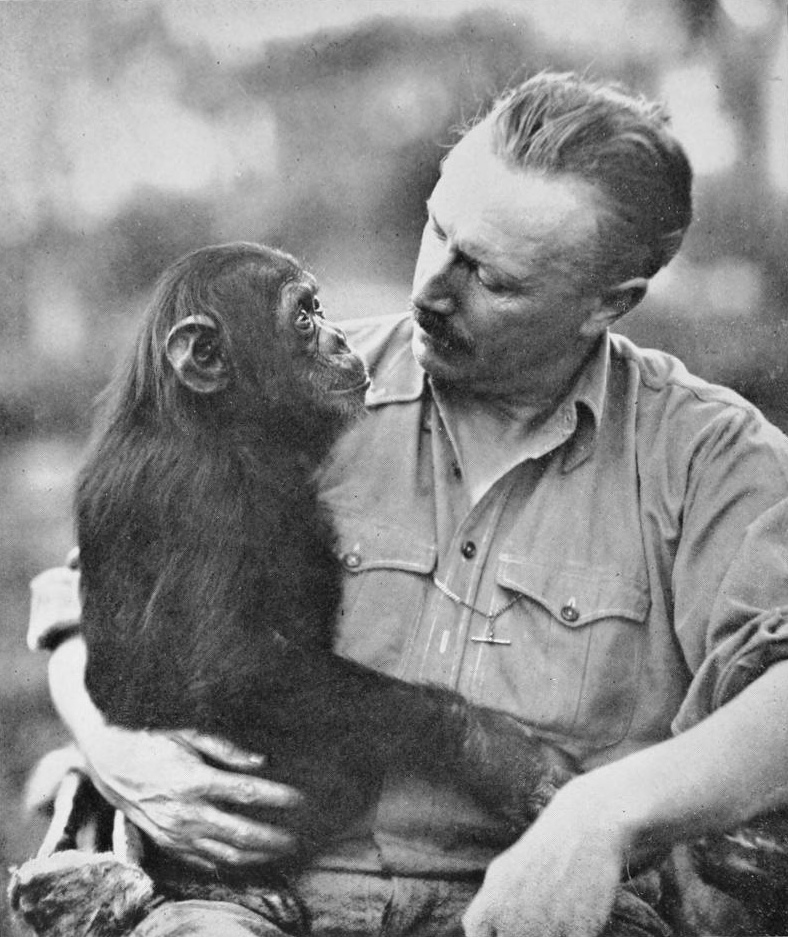
A human (Cherry Kearton) and a Chimpanzee (Toto)

The possibility of hybrids between humans and other apes has been entertained since at least the medieval period; Saint Peter Damian (11th century) claimed to have been told of the offspring of a human woman who had mated with a non-human ape, and so did Antonio Zucchelli, an Italian Franciscan capuchin friar who was a missionary in Africa from 1698 to 1702, and Sir Edward Coke in "The Institutes of the Lawes of England".

All great apes have similar genetic chromosome structure. Humans have one pair fewer chromosomes than other apes; humans have 23 chromosome pairs, while all other apes have 24, with ape chromosomes 12 and 13 fused in the human genome into a large chromosome (which contains remnants of the centromere and telomeres of the ancestral 12 and 13). Chromosomes 6, 13, 19, 21, 22, and X are structurally the same in all great apes. Chromosomes 3, 11, 14, 15, 18, and 20 match among gorillas, chimpanzees, and humans. Chimpanzees and humans match on 1, 2p, 2q, 5, 7–10, 12, 16, and Y as well. Some older references include Y as a match among gorillas, chimpanzees, and humans, but chimpanzees, bonobos, and humans have recently been found to share a large transposition from chromosome 1 to Y not found in other apes.

Chimpanzees and humans are closely related, possibly forming a clade, and evolutionary biologists have found evidence of hybridization between archaic humans and Pan troglodytes.

The degree of chromosomal similarity among apes is roughly equivalent to that found in equines. Interfertility of horses and donkeys is common, although sterility of the offspring (mules) is more common. Complexities and partial sterility pertain to horse–zebra hybrids, or zorses, whose chromosomal disparity is very wide, with horses typically having 32 chromosome pairs and zebras between 16 and 23 depending on species. The Przewalski's horse (Equus ferus przewalskii) with 33 chromosome pairs, and the domestic horse (E. f. caballus) with 32 pairs, have been found to be interfertile, and produce semi-fertile offspring: male hybrids can breed with female domestic horses.

In 1977, researcher J. Michael Bedford discovered that human sperm could penetrate the protective outer membranes of a gibbon egg. Bedford's paper also stated that human spermatozoa would not even attach to the zona surface of non-hominoid primates (baboon, rhesus monkey, and squirrel monkey), concluding that although the specificity of human spermatozoa is not confined to Homo sapiens sapiens alone, it is probably restricted to the Hominoidea. However, in the opposite direction of closely related species, it has been found that human sperm binds to gorilla oocytes with almost the same ease as to human ones.

Differing chromosome counts decrease the probability of viable offspring. Hybridization between members of different, but related genera is sometimes possible, as in the case of cama (camel and llama), wholphin (common bottlenose dolphin and false killer whale), and some felid hybrids. Even hybridization between different families, as in the case of the sturddlefish, (Note: A hybrid between the American paddlefish (Family: Polyodontidae) and the Russian sturgeon (Family: Acipenseridae), was created in a freak lab accident in 2019 when Hungarian scientists attempted to induce gynogenesis in female sturgeons with paddlefish sperm.) is possible (albeit exceedingly rare) provided the parent species are genetically similar enough to one another.

== Reports of attempted hybridization ==
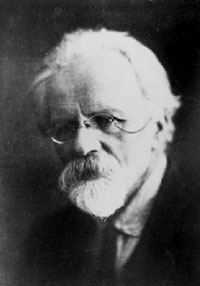
Ilya Ivanov attempted to create a human–chimpanzee hybrid via artificial insemination of female chimps with human sperm.

There have been no scientifically verified specimens of a human–chimpanzee hybrid, but there have been substantiated reports of unsuccessful attempts to create one in the Soviet Union in the 1920s, and various unsubstantiated reports on similar attempts during the second half of the 20th century.

Ilya Ivanov was the first person to attempt to create a human–chimpanzee hybrid by artificial insemination. Ivanov outlined his idea as early as 1910 in a presentation to the World Congress of Zoologists in Graz. In the 1920s, Ivanov carried out a series of experiments, culminating in inseminating three female chimpanzees with human sperm, but he failed to achieve a pregnancy. These initial experiments took place in French Guinea. (For comparison with known cama statistics, in the case of male camel–female guanaco cross the probability that insemination would lead to pregnancy was approximately 1/6.) In 1929, he attempted to organize a set of experiments involving nonhuman ape sperm and human volunteers, but was delayed by the death of his last orangutan. The next year, he fell under political criticism from the Soviet government and was sentenced to exile in the Kazakh SSR; he worked there at the Kazakh Veterinary-Zootechnical Institute and died of a stroke two years later.

In the 1970s, a performing chimpanzee named Oliver was popularized as a possible "mutant" or even a human–chimpanzee hybrid. Claims that Oliver had 47 chromosomes—midpoint between the normal 46 for humans and 48 for chimpanzees—were disproven after an examination of his genetic material at the University of Chicago in 1996. Oliver's cranial morphology, ear shape, freckles, and baldness fall within the range of variability exhibited by the common chimpanzee. Results of further studies with Oliver were published in the American Journal of Physical Anthropology.

In the 1980s, there were reports of an experiment in human–chimpanzee crossbreeding conducted in China in 1967, and on the planned resumption of such experiments. In 1981, Ji Yongxiang, head of a hospital in Shenyang, was reported as claiming to have been part of a 1967 experiment in Shenyang in which a chimpanzee female had been impregnated with human sperm. According to this account, the experiment was cut short by the Cultural Revolution, with the responsible scientists sent off to farm labour and the three-months pregnant chimpanzee dying from neglect. According to Timothy McNulty of Chicago Tribune, the report was based on an article in the Wenhui Bao newspaper of Shanghai. Li Guong of the genetics research bureau at the Chinese Academy of Sciences was cited as confirming both the existence of the experiment prior to the Cultural Revolution and the plans to resume testing.

In 2019, unconfirmed reports surfaced that a team of researchers led by Juan Carlos Izpisua Belmonte from the Salk Institute for Biological Studies in the U.S. successfully produced the first human-monkey chimera. Belmonte and others had previously produced pig and sheep embryos containing a small percentage of human cells. As with those embryos, the human-monkey chimeras were reportedly allowed to develop for just a few weeks. Although development was stopped prior to the formation of a nervous system or organs, avoiding more severe ethical concerns, the research was reportedly carried out in China to avoid legal issues. Due to the much larger evolutionary distance between humans and monkeys versus humans and chimpanzees, it is considered unlikely that true human-monkey hybrids could be brought to term. However, it is feasible that human-compatible organs for transplantation could be grown in these chimeras.

== Evidence for early hominin hybridization ==
There is evidence for a complex speciation process for the Pan–Homo split which may include hybridization, or what is known as reticulate evolution. Different chromosomes appear to have split at different times, suggesting that large-scale hybridization may have taken place over a period of as much as four million years leading up to the emergence of the distinct human and chimpanzee lineages as late as six million years ago.

The similarity of the X chromosome in humans and chimpanzees might suggest hybridization taking place as late as four million years ago. However, other mechanisms such as natural selection on the X chromosome in the chimpanzee–human last common ancestor may also explain the apparent short divergence time in the X chromosome.

It is hypothesized that the peculiar features of Homo naledi may be due to them being descendants of a relatively recent hybridization event between Homo and Australopithecus.

== See also ==
- Great ape personhood
- Human–animal hybrid
- Human evolution
