= Oregon National Primate Research Center =

Primate research center in Hillsboro, Oregon, US

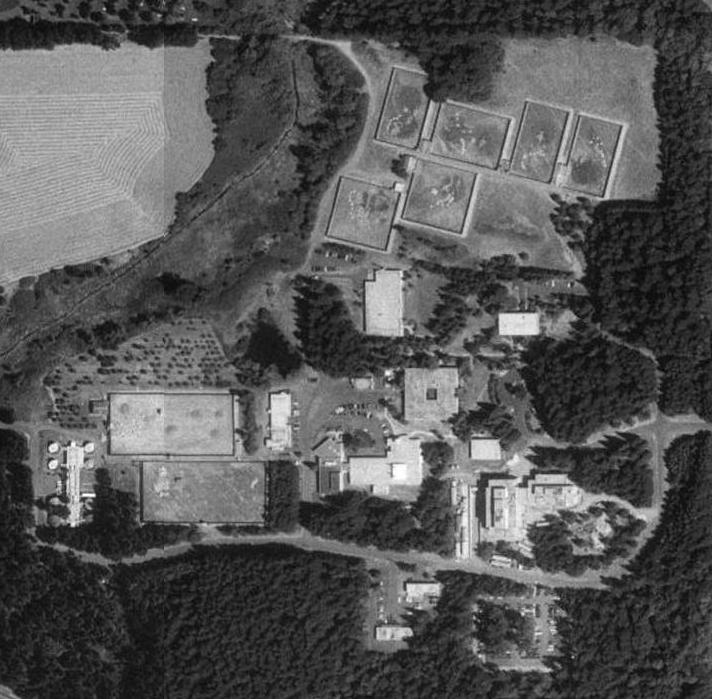
- Aerial view (2000)
- Motto: "Better Health Through Scientific Discovery"
- Established: 1962
- Research type: Biomedical on nonhuman primates
- Director: Rudolf P Bohm, Jr
- Staff: 267
- Location: Hillsboro, Oregon, United States; 45.524006°N 122.874824°W
- Campus: 350 acres (1.4 km^{2})
- Operating agency: Oregon Health & Science University
- Website: www.ohsu.edu

The Oregon National Primate Research Center (ONPRC) is one of seven federally funded National Primate Research Centers in the United States and has been affiliated with Oregon Health and Science University (OHSU) since 1998. The center is located on 200 acres (0.81 km^{2}) of land in Hillsboro, Oregon. Originally known as the Oregon Regional Primate Research Center (ORPRC), it was the first of the original seven primate centers established by the National Institutes of Health (NIH). The research center is administered and funded by the National Center for Research Resources, receiving $11 million in federal grants annually.

The center maintains a colony of 4,200 non-human primates (consisting of rhesus monkeys, Japanese macaques, vervets, baboons and cynomolgus macaques), cared for by 12 veterinarians and 100 full-time technicians. Living conditions at the facility are inspected bi-annually by the USDA in unannounced visits. Animal rights activists have criticized the practice.

The primates are used in pure and applied biomedical research into fertility control, early embryo development, obesity, brain development and degeneration, and newly emerging viruses, especially AIDS-related agents. Research projects at the facility have produced some notable findings, such as the first successful cloning of primate embryos and extraction of stem cells, which was named the number one scientific achievement of 2007 by Time.

== History ==
Construction of the facility began in 1961 after a $1.9 million grant from the National Institutes of Health. It was built on 240 acres (0.97 km^{2}) in Washington County and opened in 1962. In 1970, the Oregon location became the first of the regional centers to build and use outdoor breeding facilities. By 1976 the campus housed 18 different species and 2,100 total animals while employing 225 people.

In 1988, the center added the Cooley Center for Cell and Molecular Biology to the campus, followed by the Animal Services Building in 1992. OHSU took over in 1998 when the center was merged into the university. In 2002, the center was renamed from the Oregon Regional Primate Center to the current name after the NIH changes the designation of all the primate research centers.

== Research ==
Scientists at the Oregon National Primate Research Center have published several research projects which have a made significant impact on health sciences.

=== Cloning and embryonic stem cells ===
In 2007, ONPRC scientists were the first to utilize cloning to reproduce primate embryos, and then extract embryonic stem cells — a procedure only previously performed in rodents, and which garnered expectations of being reproduced in humans. This breakthrough was named the number one scientific achievement of the year by Time magazine. In 2011, the center cloned chimeric monkeys using stem cells from six different monkeys, also a first.

=== Multiple sclerosis ===
Researchers have identified factors that prevent the repair of brain damage caused by multiple sclerosis, complications of premature birth, and other diseases; as well as a key gene that impacts the timing of puberty and can shorten the time span for reproduction.

=== AIDS ===
Recent publications have suggested that a component of the immune system damaged by AIDS might be replaceable, and have indicated a way to detect intra-amniotic infections in non-human primates, which may result in the development of a test for infections that cause premature birth in humans.

=== Obesity ===
Findings in the area of obesity research include the role of the hormone leptin in causing/preventing obesity, how leptin resistance occurs and can be reversed, how a high-fat diet during pregnancy affects the foetus, how the natural hormone PYY can cause limited weight loss, and how reduced caloric intake may slow aging and weakening of the immune system.

== Incidents and controversy ==
=== 2010-2014 ===
In June 2013, 21 macaques were injured and 6 macaques were killed or were euthanized when fighting broke out among a group of 260 macaques who were being housed together. Staff believed that fighting broke out due to loud noises from construction near the macaques' housing.

In June 2013, the USDA reported several health and facility problems at the ONPRC. First, they reported that more than 50% of rhesus macaques had significant hair loss. Staff at the ONPRC did not know why it was occurring. The USDA also reported dirty and soiled bedding in some of the primate housing areas, as well as muddy areas in some of the outdoor housing areas. Additionally, the USDA reported cracked walls and defects in floor coating in some of the indoor housing areas, which made it difficult to clean and disinfect.

In 2014, the USDA reported that a macaque was killed during an imaging procedure after the staff accidentally left a valve closed on the anesthesia machine.

In February 2014, two animals suffered burns from an electric heating pad which was used during a procedure. The burns on one animal were so bad that the animal required surgery.

=== 2015-2019 ===
In March 2015, the USDA reported that staff did not follow appropriate protocols when injecting a macaque with an experimental substance, which resulted in lesions to the macaque's skin. The staff made several breaches of protocol by giving the macaque six injections rather than the approved single injection, not shaving the injection site, and not notifying veterinary staff and the IACUC within the required 72 hours after the injection.

In January 2016, the USDA reported that during 2015 an animal died after being entrapped in a chain in its enclosure. The chain was part of an enrichment device with an obsolete design.

In February 2017, the USDA reported that two animals were harmed and one of which had to be euthanized after staff accidentally used a tuberculin syringe rather an insulin syringe to inject the animals with insulin.

In February 2017, the USDA reported that a baboon broke its hand, which has likely due to a heavy guillotine door. The USDA also made note of excessive cobwebs and dust in some of the animal areas, which create both health risks and fire risks.

In February 2018, the USDA reported that a primate was erroneously assigned to a surgical procedure despite being restricted from involvement in any more surgeries. The primate had been given a C-section in one procedure and an embryo transfer in another procedure.

In February 2018, the USDA reported a primate's tail was caught in a gap between two enclosures which resulted in a degloving injury and for which the staff then amputated the tail.

In February 2018, the USDA reported that a juvenile primate died after getting trapped behind a wall-hung cage.

In February 2018, a primate was not given buprenorphine (used to alleviate pain) or cefazolin (used to treat infections) after surgery, which was part of the approved protocol.

In May 2018, a young primate was trapped in PVC pipes of a resting perch. The primate was treated by veterinarians but was later euthanized after its condition deteriorated.

In July 2018, the USDA reported that two primates died after their anesthesia was inadequately monitored during surgery.

=== 2020-present ===
In January 2020, a juvenile macaque was trapped under a steel trough drain cover after a technician had not properly secured the cover.

In August 2020, two macaques were killed when a technician accidentally put their cage, with the macaques inside, into an automatic cage washer.

In October 2020, two macaques managed to escape from their cages and injured five other macaques, who were in their cages.

In October 2021, two macaques were injured after the barrier between their cages malfunctioned, which allowed the macaques to access each other. The macaques fought and sustained injuries which took several days to heal.

== Animal care oversight ==
The center receives unannounced bi-annual inspections by the United States Department of Agriculture. It has been accredited by the Association for Assessment and Accreditation of Laboratory Animal Care International since 1975. As required by the Animal Welfare Act, the center also maintains an Institutional Animal Care and Use Committee; each IACUC must consist of at least one veterinarian with training in laboratory animal science and expertise in the species under consideration, at least one practicing research scientist, and at least one person not affiliated with the institution to represent community interests in proper care and use of animals.

== Animal rights groups ==
In 2000, animal rights activist Matt Rossell posed as a laboratory technician and later released video footage he had taken from inside the center. He accused them of violating federal laws and ignoring signs of distress among the rhesus monkeys housed there. "OHSU responded that Rossell's motives were suspect and his videotapes misleading." The USDA concluded that the allegations were unfounded.

In 2007, People for the Ethical Treatment of Animals (PETA) filed a complaint with the federal government after one of their members obtained a job at the primate center for day to day animal care and was able to take video and photos. A center spokesman said the behavior of the monkeys seen in the footage was attributable to the infiltrator entering into and creating an unfamiliar environment for the animals.

== See also ==
- Animal testing
- Non-human primate experiments
