= Texas Biomedical Research Institute =

Medical research institute in San Antonio

Coordinates: 29°26′12″N 98°38′14″W

- Established: 1941
- Faculty: 60+
- Staff: 360+
- Location: (United States) San Antonio, Texas, USA*
- Website: www.txbiomed.org

Texas Biomedical Research Institute (Texas Biomed), located in San Antonio, Texas, is an independent, non-profit biomedical research institution, specializing in genetics and in virology and immunology. Texas Biomed is funded by government and corporate grants and contracts, and donations from the public.

== History ==
Texas Biomed was founded in 1941 by Tom Slick as the Foundation of Applied Research. Its initial mission was to provide research and advanced education in agriculture, natural sciences and medicine. It became the Southwest Foundation for Research and Education in 1952. In the late 1950s, the Institute moved to its current location on Military Drive. In 1982, The Foundation was renamed Southwest Foundation for Biomedical Research (SFBR) and Texas Biomedical Research Institute on February 1, 2011.

Tom Slick’s sister, Betty Moorman, helped establish a club whose members could make an annual contribution to support the Foundation’s research. In the 1950s, the Foundation purchased an historic 1854 mansion in San Antonio called The Argyle to serve as the headquarters. Members of the club continue to meet and support scientific research at Texas Biomed today with their time and resources. A group of women called the Texas Biomedical Forum raises money to support pilot grants for Texas Biomed scientists, science awards for outstanding teachers, and tours of the Institute for high school students.

In 1988, the Founders Council formed. It includes supporters ages 25 to 46 who support the Institute are community advocates and financial supporters. The Founders Council also provides grants for equipment to Texas Biomed scientists.

== Structure ==
Located on a 200-acre (0.81 km^{2}) campus on the northwest side of San Antonio, Texas Biomed employs over 60 doctoral level biomedical scientists, including 18 principal investigators and 360+ staff members. Focused on basic biomedical research, the Institute is divided into the Department of Genetics and the Department of Virology & Immunology. The Southwest National Primate Research Center, a part of Texas Biomed, is an international resource that provides specialized facilities and expertise in research with nonhuman primates to investigators from around the US and other countries. It maintains 2,500 nonhuman primates.

Texas Biomed maintains the only privately owned Biosafety level 4 (BSL-4) laboratory in the United States, developing bioterrorism defenses and novel strategies against incurable infectious diseases.

The AT&T Genomics Computing Center, "the world's largest computer cluster devoted to statistical genetic analysis," helps scientists find genes that influence susceptibility to diseases at record speed.

== Scientific accomplishments ==
- Developed high frequency ventilator to rescue premature babies from death or lifelong disabilities.
- Played key role in developing the current hepatitis B vaccine now administered in 116 countries.
- Identified genes that influence heart disease, diabetes, obesity, and other common health problems.
- Developed vaccines, antibodies and antitoxins for deadly agents of bioterrorism such as Ebola, botulinum neurotoxins, and anthrax.
- Developed promising hormone-derived therapies with potential to treat breast and prostate cancer.
- Developed important animal models for research on cancer, heart disease, obesity, AIDS, and hepatitis among other public health problems that afflict millions around the globe.
- Created methods to diagnose infections with herpes B virus, which is lethal to humans.
- Identified genes influencing drug resistance to malaria parasites.
- Helped advance a new treatment which moved from animal to human trials for chronic hepatitis B virus (HBV) infection.
- Discovered a promising drug therapy candidate for the treatment of Ebola.

== Current research projects ==
- Investigating genetic and dietary factors that have major roles in influencing susceptibility to cardiovascular disease, diabetes, and obesity
- Evaluating novel approaches to curing hepatitis C, which infects three percent of the world’s population and is the leading cause of liver failure in the US.
- Developing vaccine strategies for Ebola, HIV, Lassa virus, West Nile virus, Japanese encephalitis viruses, and herpes.
- Genetically characterizing the parasites which cause malaria and schistosomiasis, with the common goal of developing more effective drugs and disease control strategies for these global health problems.
- Studying ways of preventing or treating diseases caused by respiratory syncytial virus (RSV), herpes simplex virus, and dengue virus.
- Research on preventing and treating Mycobacterium tuberculosis with particular emphasis on TB and aging, diabetes, and vaccine development.
- Developing an animal model to test vaccines to protect people against the Zika virus.

== Controversy ==
On April 14, 2018, four baboons escaped from the facility. They were contained within the same day.

In 2015, it was announced that the institute is under a federal investigation after the death of at least five primates over a five-year period. According to news reports, one monkey was crushed to death by a cage door, another died from strangulation, and another from blood poisoning following a traumatic injury.

In 2014, the Humane Society of the United States released undercover footage from inside the institute which, according to the animal welfare group, “found a pattern of animal mistreatment, including overcrowding and lack of veterinary care”. The group said their investigation found animals suffering from severe stress and improper treatment after injuries. In response, the institute argued they have “a long-standing commitment to treating animals humanely and with the highest regard for their well-being, and […] continuously seek to enhance the care provided to” the animals in their facility.

Between 2012 and 2015, the institute was cited by federal inspectors for at least 16 alleged violations of the Animal Welfare Act. In 2012, the institute was fined $25,714 for alleged violations and two years prior it paid a $6,094 settlement to the government for additional alleged violations. The institute says the alleged violations are a result of isolated incidents and are not reflective of their treatment of the monkeys in their laboratories.

== See also ==
- Southwest Research Institute
- University of Texas Health Science Center
- Southwest National Primate Research Center
- Animal testing
