= Leadbeater's =

"Leadbeater's" most commonly refers to Leadbeater's possum, but may refer to several eponymous species:

- Leadbeater's possum, (Gymnobelideus leadbeateri). Named after John Leadbeater
- Southern ground-hornbill, (Bucorvus leadbeateri). Named after Benjamin Leadbeater
- Major Mitchell's cockatoo, or Leadbeater's cockatoo (Lophochroa leadbeateri). Named after Benjamin Leadbeater.
- Violet-fronted brilliant (Heliodoxa leadbeateri). A hummingbird named after Benjamin Leadbeater.

== See also ==
- Leadbeater, a surname
- Leadbetter (disambiguation)
- Ledbetter (disambiguation)
