= Ledbetter =

Ledbetter may refer to:

== Places in the United States ==
- Ledbetter, Kentucky, a census-designated place
- Ledbetter, Texas, an unincorporated community
- Ledbetter Gardens, Dallas, a neighborhood in the West Dallas area of Dallas, Texas
- Ledbetter station, a DART Light Rail station in the southern part of Dallas, Texas
- Leadbetter Beach or Ledbetter Beach, a beach in Santa Barbara, California

== Other uses ==
- Ledbetter (surname)

== See also ==
- Leadbetter (disambiguation)
- Leadbeater, a surname
- Leadbeater's (disambiguation)
