= David Leadbetter =

David or Dave Leadbetter may refer to:

- Dave Leadbetter (1934–2006), Scottish/English politician
- David Leadbetter (golf instructor) (born 1952), British golf instructor

== See also ==
- David H. Ledbetter (born 1953), human geneticist
