= Leadbetter =

Leadbetter may refer to:

== Places ==
- Leadbetter Beach (or Ledbetter Beach), a beach in Santa Barbara, California.
- Leadbetter Point, a point in Pacific County, Washington.
- Leadbetter Point State Park, a state park and protected area in the U.S. state of Washington.

== Others ==
- Leadbetter (surname), includes a list of people and characters with the name

== See also ==
- Leadbeater's (disambiguation)
- Ledbetter (disambiguation)
