= Leadbitter =

Leadbitter is a surname. Notable people with the surname include:

- Chris Leadbitter (born 1967), English footballer
- Daniel Leadbitter (born 1990), English footballer
- Eric Leadbitter (1891–1971), British soldier
- Graham Leadbitter, Scottish politician
- Grant Leadbitter (born 1986), English footballer
- John Leadbitter (born 1953), English footballer
- Mike Leadbitter (1942–1974), British author
- Ted Leadbitter (1919–1996), British politician
- Tom Leadbitter (1945–1995), British racer

== See also ==
- Leadbetter (surname)
