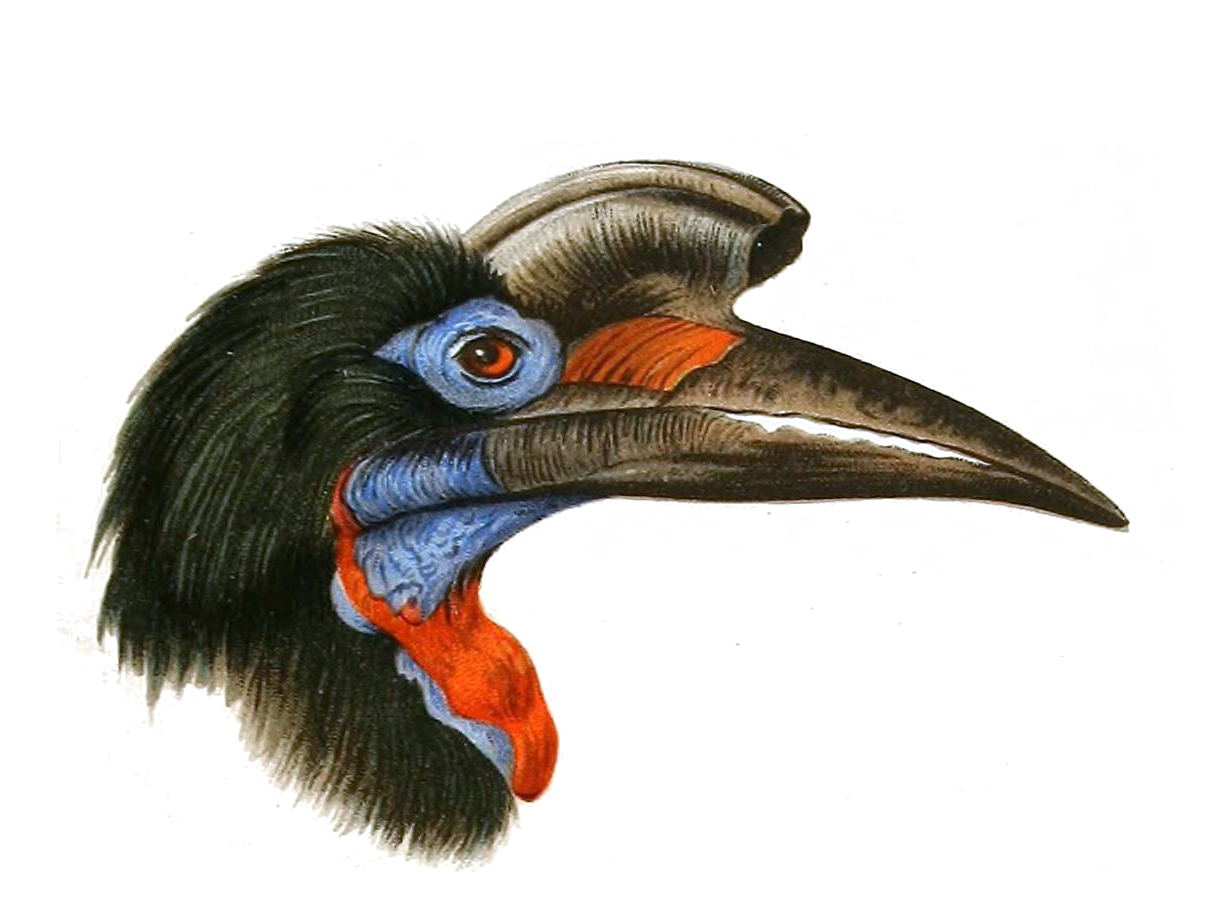
- Male Abyssinian ground hornbill (Bucorvus abyssinicus)

Scientific classification
- Kingdom: Animalia
- Phylum: Chordata
- Class: Aves
- Order: Bucerotiformes
- Family: Bucerotidae
- Genus: Bucorvus; Lesson, 1830

Type species
- Buceros abyssinicus Boddaert, 1783

= Ground hornbill =

Bucorvus

Genus of birds

The ground hornbills are birds belonging to the genus, Bucorvus, in the hornbill family, Bucerotidae. The two species are endemic to open savanna regions of sub-Saharan Africa: the Abyssinian ground hornbill occurs in a belt from Senegal east to Ethiopia, and the southern ground hornbill occurs in southern and East Africa.

Ground hornbills are large, with adults around a metre tall. Both species are ground-dwelling, unlike other hornbills. They are carnivorous and feed on insects, snakes, other birds, amphibians and even tortoises.

== Taxonomy ==
The genus Bucorvus was introduced in 1830, originally as a subgenus, by the French naturalist René Lesson to accommodate a single species, Buceros abyssinicus Boddaert, the Abyssinian ground hornbill. This is the type species. The generic name is a portmanteau of the genus Buceros introduced by Carl Linnaeus in 1758 for the Asian hornbills and corvus, the Latin word for a "raven".

A molecular phylogenetic study published in 2013 found that the genus Bucorvus was sister to the rest of the hornbills. The ground hornbills are estimated to have diverged from the other hornbills in the early Miocene, around 22 million years ago. A fossil species, Bucorvus brailloni, is known from the Middle Miocene of Morocco. The ground hornbills in the genus Bucorvus have sometimes been placed in a separate family, Bucorvidae.

The genus contains two extant species:

Image	Common name	Scientific name	Distribution
	Abyssinian ground hornbill	Bucorvus abyssinicus	Senegambia to Ethiopia, northern Uganda, and northeastern Kenya
	Southern ground hornbill	Bucorvus leadbeateri	savanna of eastern and southern Africa
