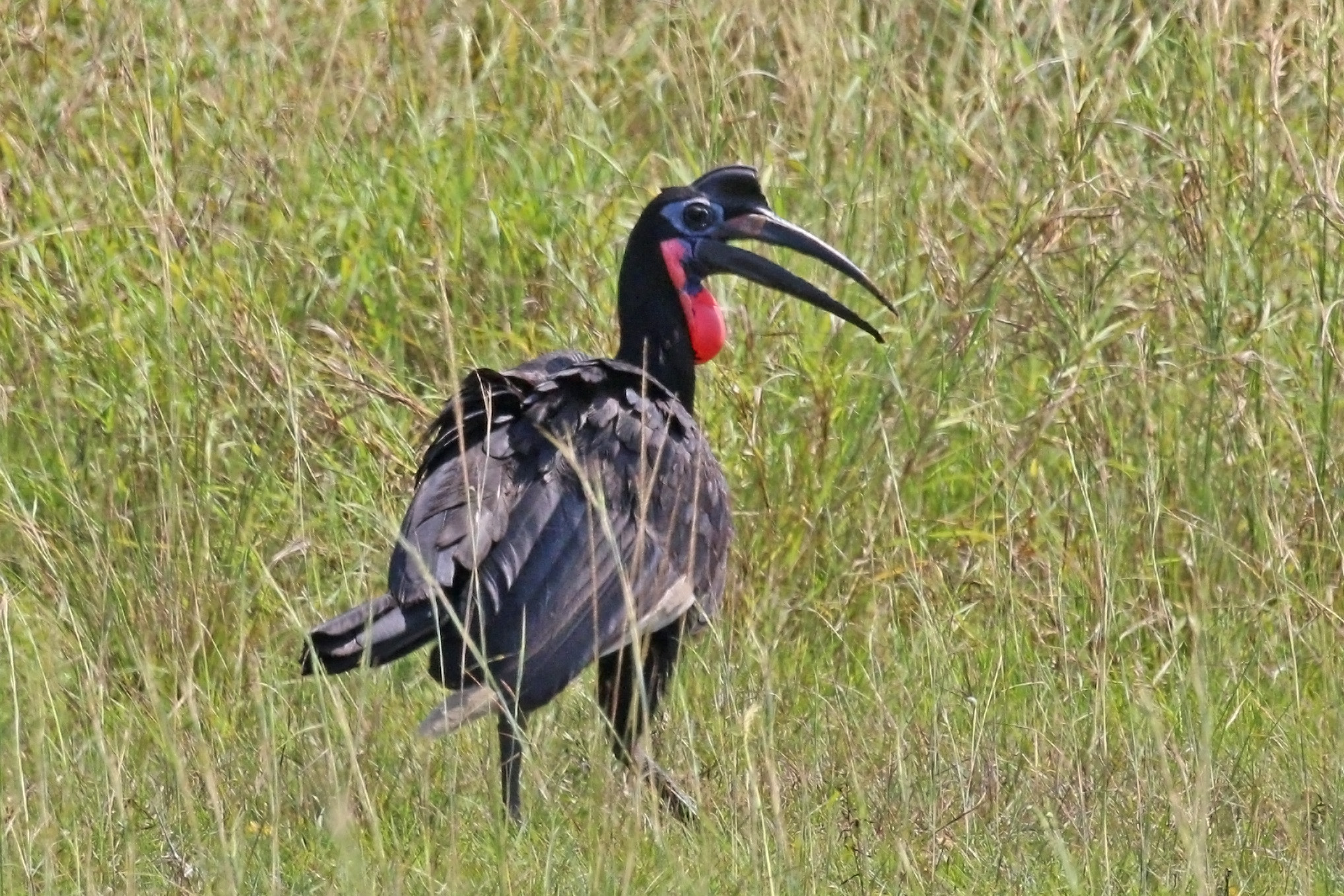
- male
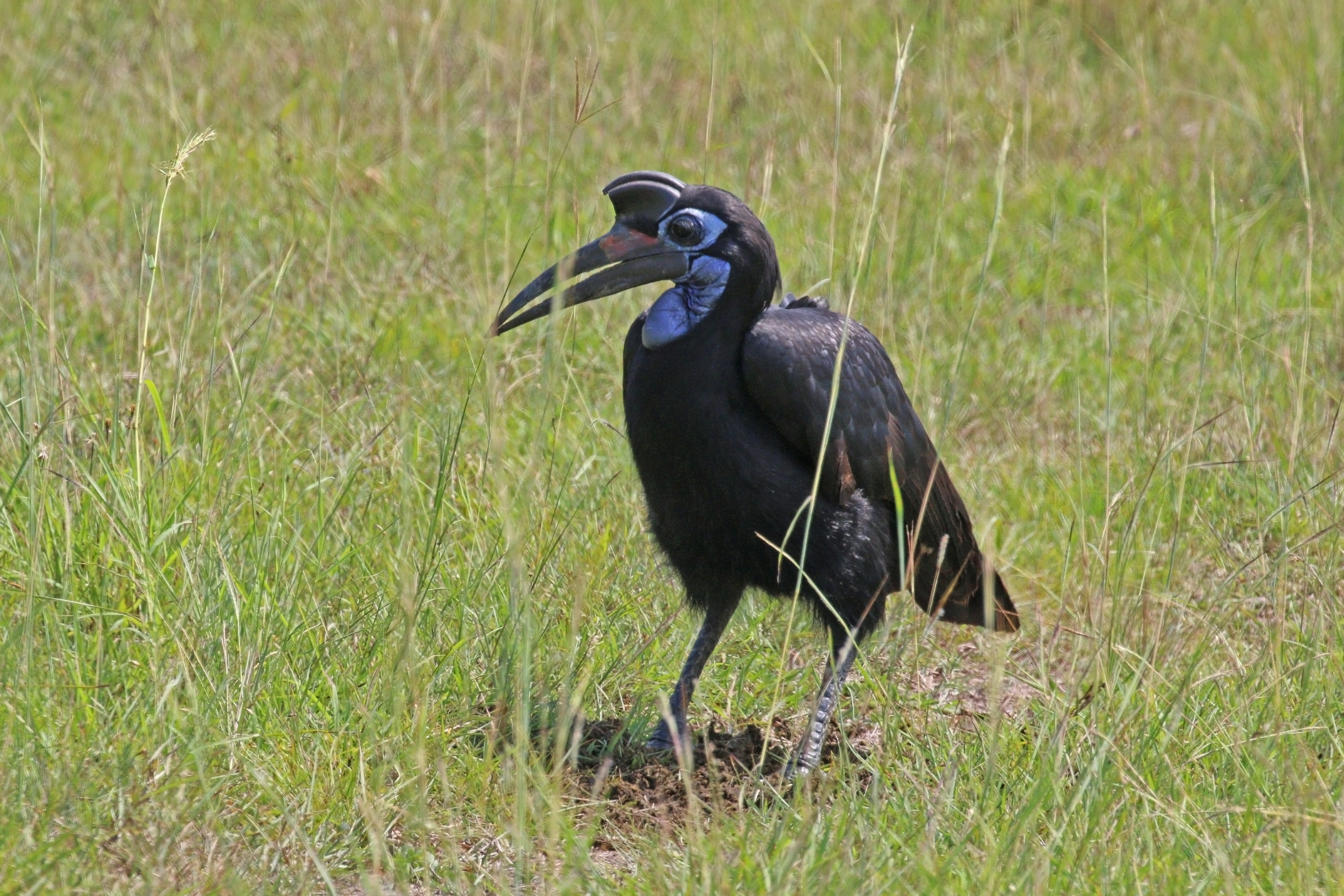
- female both at Semliki Wildlife Reserve, Uganda

Conservation status
- Vulnerable (IUCN 3.1)

Scientific classification
- Kingdom: Animalia
- Phylum: Chordata
- Class: Aves
- Order: Bucerotiformes
- Family: Bucerotidae
- Genus: Bucorvus
- Species: B. abyssinicus

Binomial name
- Bucorvus abyssinicus (Boddaert, 1783)
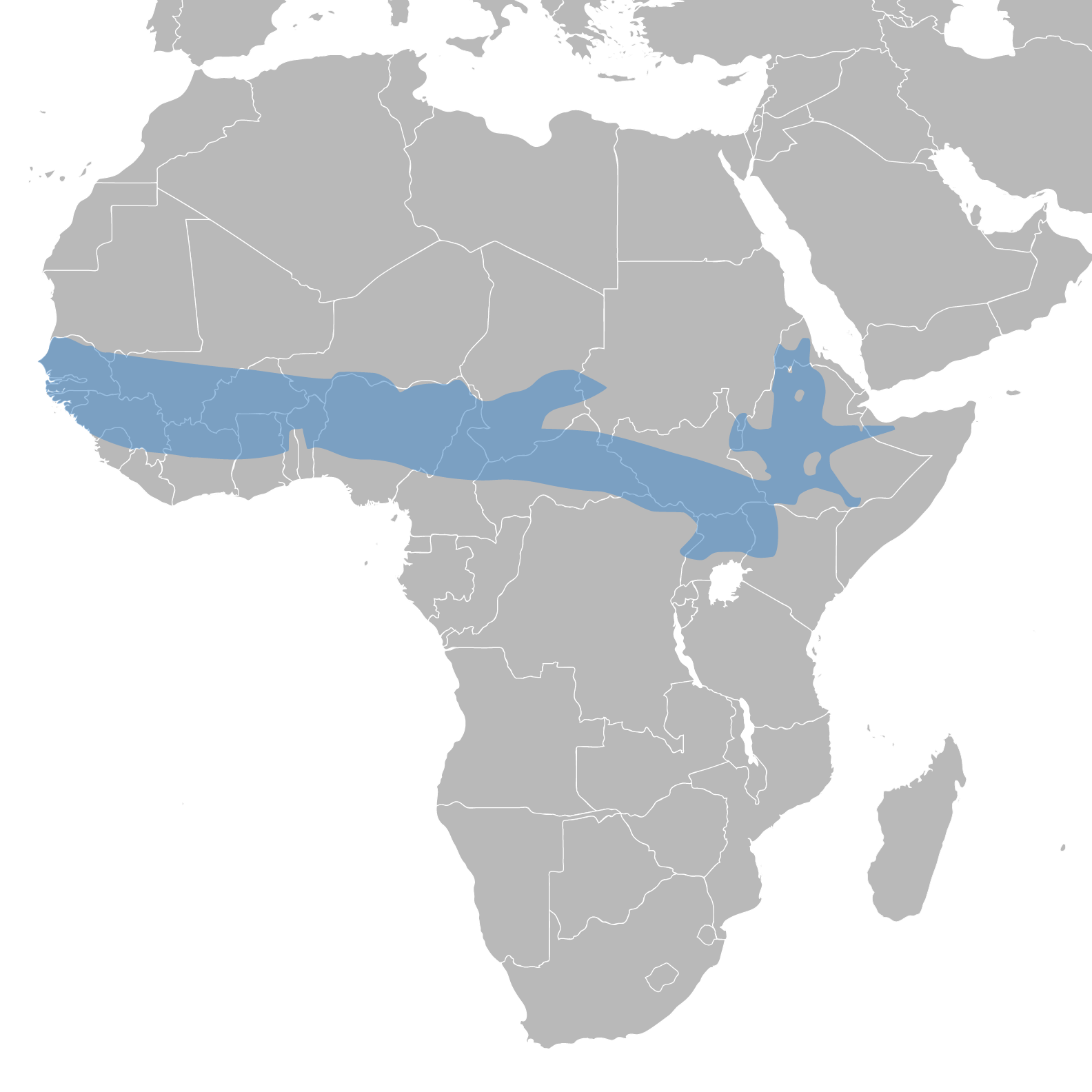

= Abyssinian ground hornbill =

Species of bird

The Abyssinian ground hornbill or northern ground hornbill (Bucorvus abyssinicus) is an African bird, found north of the equator, and is one of two species of ground hornbill. It is the second largest species of African hornbill, only surpassed by the slightly larger southern ground hornbill.

== Taxonomy ==
The Abyssinian ground hornbill was described by the French polymath Georges-Louis Leclerc, Comte de Buffon in 1780 in his Histoire Naturelle des Oiseaux. The bird was also illustrated in a hand-coloured plate engraved by François-Nicolas Martinet in the Planches Enluminées D'Histoire Naturelle which was produced under the supervision of Edme-Louis Daubenton to accompany Buffon's text. Neither the plate caption nor Buffon's description included a scientific name but in 1783 the Dutch naturalist Pieter Boddaert coined the binomial name Buceros abyssinicus in his catalogue of the Planches Enluminées. The type locality is Ethiopia. The Abyssinian ground hornbill is now placed in the genus Bucorvus that was introduced, originally as a subgenus, by the French naturalist René Lesson in 1830. The species is monotypic. The generic name is derived from the name of the genus Buceros introduced by Carl Linnaeus in 1758 for the Asian hornbills where corvus is the Latin word for a "raven".

== Description ==
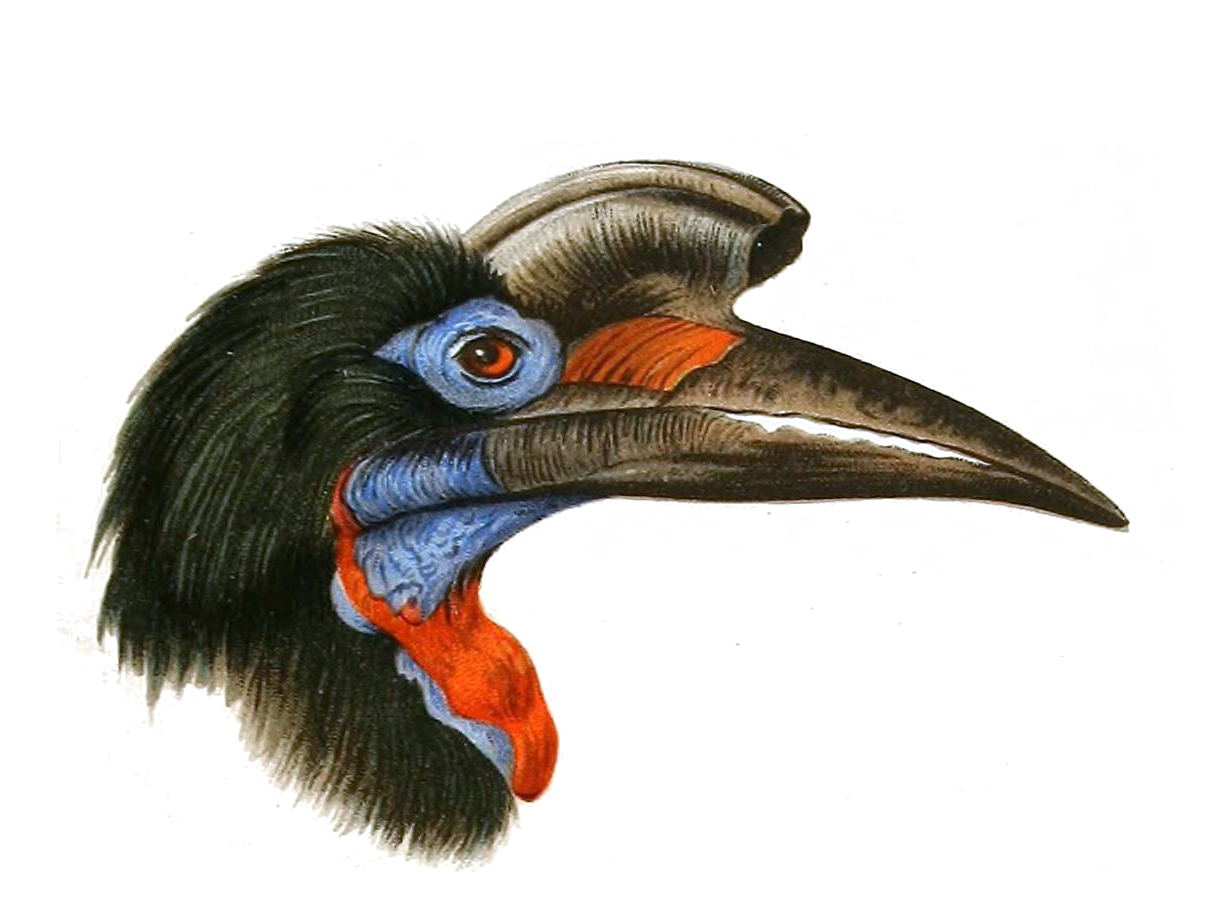
Sketch of head

The Abyssinian ground hornbill is a large, terrestrial hornbill with black body feathers and white primary feathers which are visible in flight. The adult male has a patch of bare blue skin around the eye and an inflatable patch of bare skin on the neck and throat which is red, apart from the upper throat which is blue. The bill is long and black except for a reddish patch at the base of the mandible. On top of the bill there is a short open-ended black casque. The female is similar but smaller with any bare skin being wholly dark blue. Juvenile birds are dark sooty-brown with a smaller bill, with an incipient casque. As the juvenile matures, which usually takes 3 years, it gradually develops the plumage, bare skin colour and casque of the adults. The total length is 90 to 110 cm (35 to 43 in).

The Abyssinian ground hornbill has long feathers that look like eyelashes that surround its eyes. These protect the eyes from injury.

It reportedly averages around 90 to 100 cm (35 to 39 in) tall, around 110 cm (43 in) and weighs approximately 4 kg (8.8 lb). Per Stevenson and Fanshawe, the Abyssinian is a larger species on average than the southern ground hornbill, at 102 cm (40 in), but published weights and standard measurements contrarily indicate the southern species is indeed slightly larger.

=== Voice ===
A deep booming uh-uh, uh-uh-uh which is far carrying and is normally made at dawn from either a perch or from the ground. The male and female sing in duets.

== Distribution and habitat ==
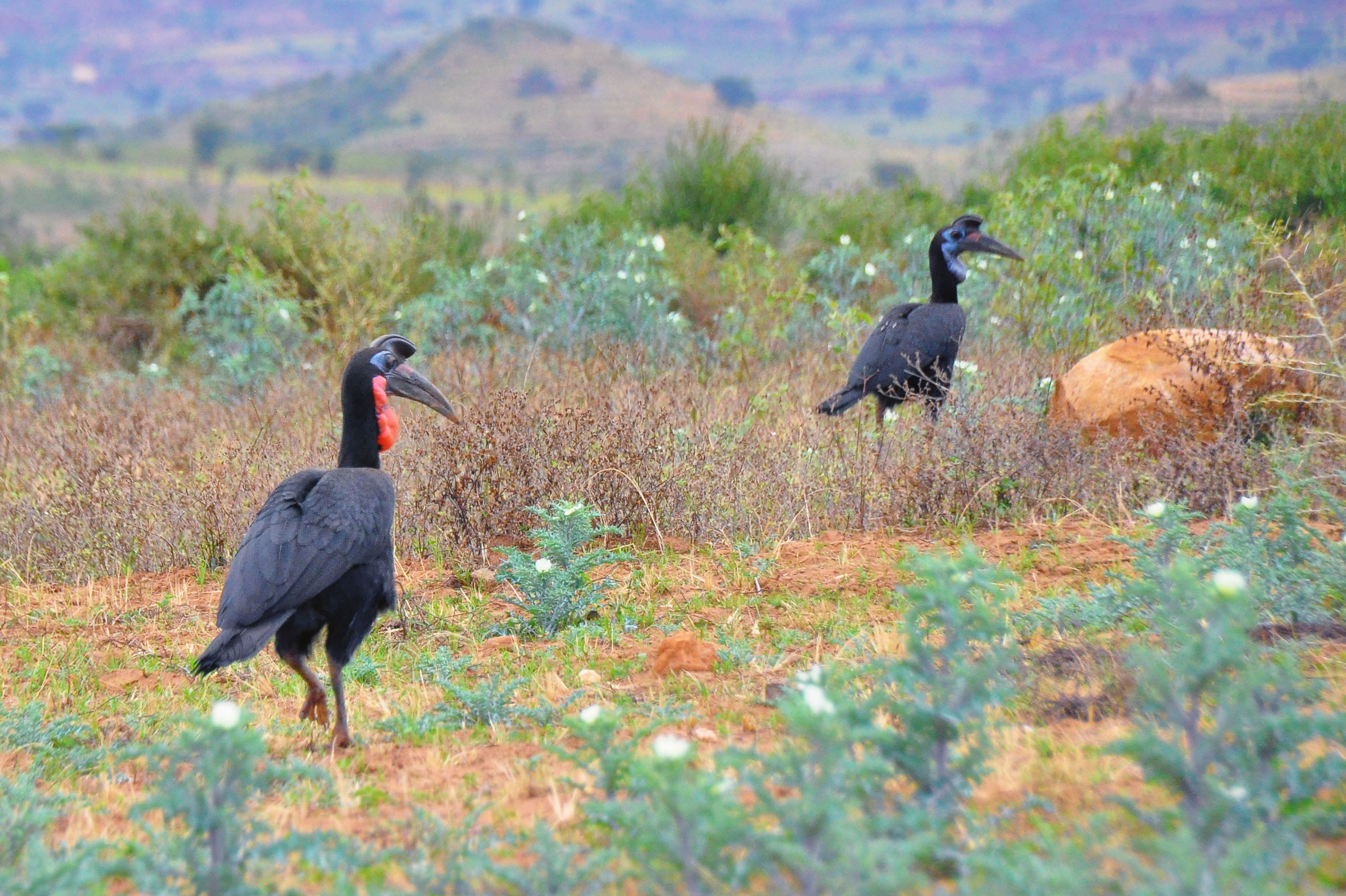
At the Omo river valley in Ethiopia

The Abyssinian ground hornbill is found in Northern sub-Saharan Africa from southern Mauritania, Senegal and Guinea east to Eritrea, Ethiopia, north western Somalia, north western Kenya and Uganda.

It is found in open habitats such as savanna, sub-desert scrub, and rocky areas, preferring short vegetation which enables its visual foraging technique. The areas inhabited by this species are usually drier areas than the preferred habitat of the Southern ground hornbill. It will tolerate disturbed areas but does require large trees to be used as nest sites.

The Abyssinian ground hornbill has escaped or been deliberately released in to Florida, USA, but there is no evidence that the population is breeding and may only persist due to continuing releases or escapes.

== Behaviour ==
The Abyssinian ground hornbill lives in open grassland, in pairs or small family parties. They patrol their territory by walking and are reluctant fliers, usually only taking to the air when alarmed. In captivity, they can live 35–40 years. Diet in the wild consists of a wide variety of small vertebrates and invertebrates, including tortoises, lizards, snakes, birds, spiders, beetles, and caterpillars; they also take carrion, some fruits, seeds, and groundnuts. Groups of ground hornbills have territories of 2–100 square miles (5.2–259.0 km^{2}). They are diurnal.

=== Breeding ===
The breeding season of the Abyssinian ground hornbill varies across its range: the West African populations breed in June through to August, Nigerian and Ugandan populations breed in January, and Kenyan birds breed as late as November. They prefer to nest in large trees, with baobabs and palm stumps being preferred; the nest is constructed in a cavity. They have also been recorded nesting in other types of cavities including holes in rocks and man-made cavities such as bee-hive logs or baskets. In the ground hornbills the females are partially sealed in using a mixture of mud and vegetation. In other hornbills the nesting female moult their all flight feathers at once but this is not the case in the ground hornbills. The male prepares the nest by lining the cavity with dry leaves before the female enters and lays a clutch of one or two eggs over around five days. She starts to incubate as soon as the first egg is laid so that the chick which hatches first has a head start in development over its sibling. Incubation of each egg takes between 37 and 41 days, during which time there is no effort to keep the cavity clean and the male is responsible for providing food to the incubating female. The weight of the newly hatched chick is around 70 g (2.5 oz) and the first-hatched grows rapidly at the expense of the second, which will normally die of starvation before it is four days old by which time its sibling can weigh as much as 350 g (12 oz). When the surviving chick is 21 to 33 days old the mother leaves the nest and starts to help in food provision, then after 80 to 90 days the chick leaves the nest.

Abyssinian ground hornbills invest a lot in their offspring and the fledged juveniles will remain with their parents for up to three years. They have a slow breeding rate and an average of one chick is raised to adulthood every 9 years so the adults' investment in each young bird raised is exceptionally high.

=== Feeding ===
Abyssinian ground hornbills are opportunist feeders, following ungulate herds and forest fires so that they can prey on small animals disturbed by the larger animals or flames. An individual hornbill can walk up to 11 km (6.8 mi) in a day, pouncing on and eating animals they come across. They have also been recorded digging for arthropods in the soil and attacking bee hives for honeycomb; they very rarely consume any plant matter. The strong bill is used to capture and overcome the prey before it is eaten.

== Predators, parasites and diseases ==
Abyssinian ground hornbills are preyed on by large carnivores, such as leopards. Human predation for food occurs in some countries, including northern Cameroon and Burkina Faso. The nests may be preyed upon by smaller terrestrial predators.

The Abyssinian ground hornbill is a known host for the bird lice Bucorvellus docophorus, Bucerophagus productus and Bucerophagus africanus; it is also a host for the nematode Histiocephalus bucorvi and the tapeworms Chapmania unilateralis, Idiogenes bucorvi, Ophryocotyloides pinguis, and Paruterina daouensis. An individual held in captivity but which had been caught in the wild died from an infection of the bacteria Aeromonas hydrophila, a common pathogen in fish but not previously recorded in wild Abyssinian ground hornbills. In North America captive Abyssinian ground hornbills have also been known to die because of West Nile virus.

== Cultural importance ==
Abyssinian ground hornbills are not a normal quarry for commercial hunters, although they are not uncommon in captivity in zoos. In some areas the species has cultural significance and hunters may tie the severed head and neck of these birds around their necks in the belief that it helps them stalk their wild ungulate quarry. In some villages the call is often imitated and there are even entire songs based on the male and female duets of Abyssinian ground hornbills.

== Status and conservation ==
The Abyssinian ground hornbill is subject to the loss and degradation of its habitat and it is a quarry of hunters, in a similar way to its congener, the Southern ground hornbill, and, as a result, it is thought that the population may have started a rapid decline. As a result of this perceived decline the IUCN give its status as Vulnerable.

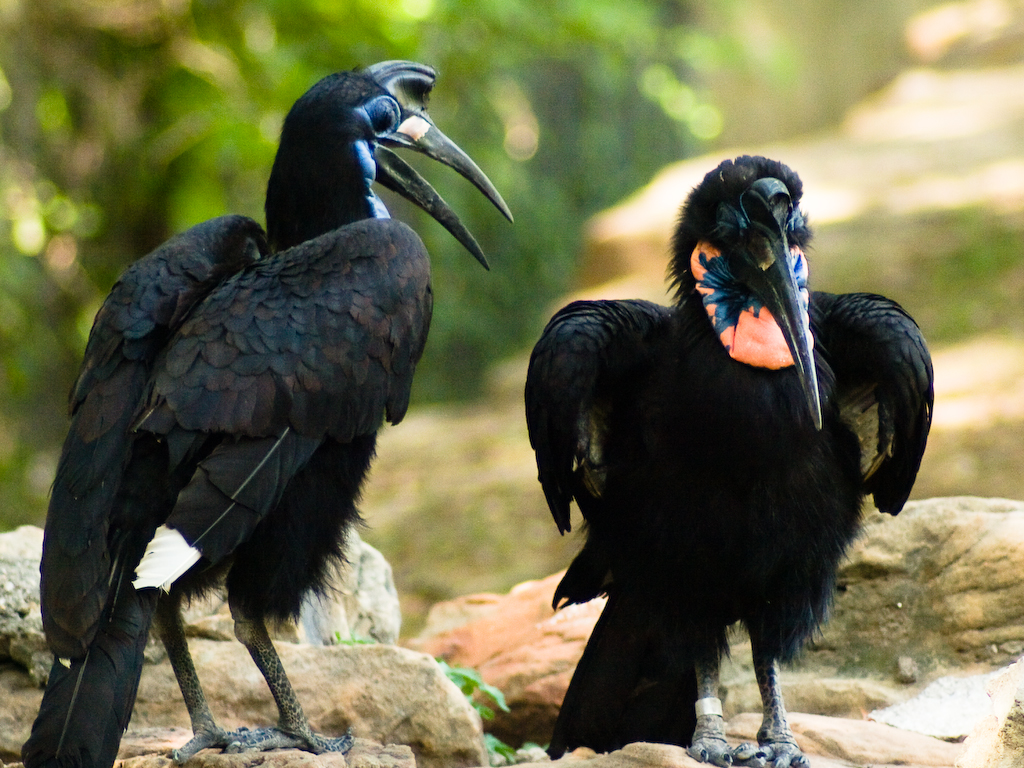
A pair at Fort Worth Zoo

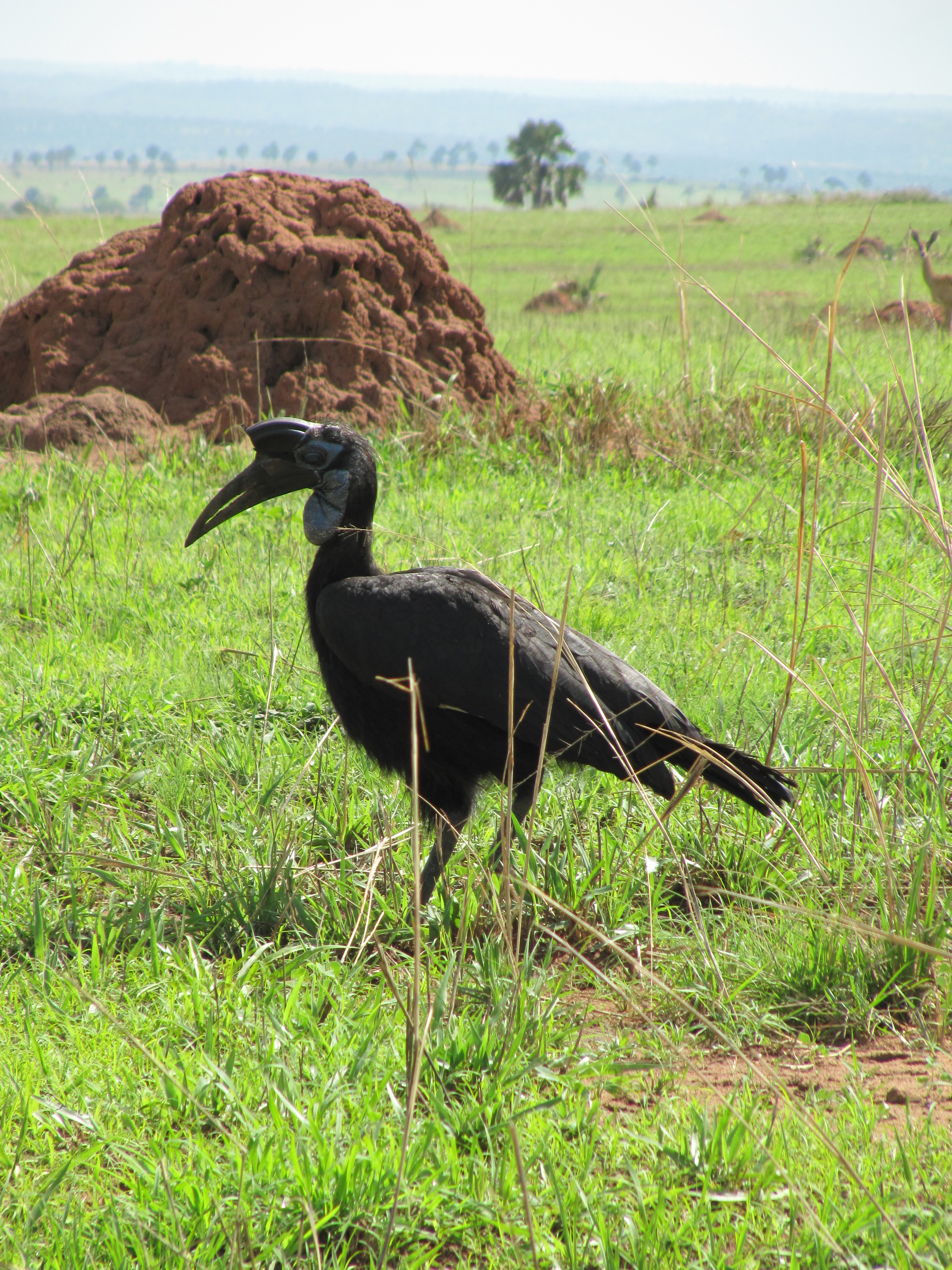
Female in Murchison Falls National Park

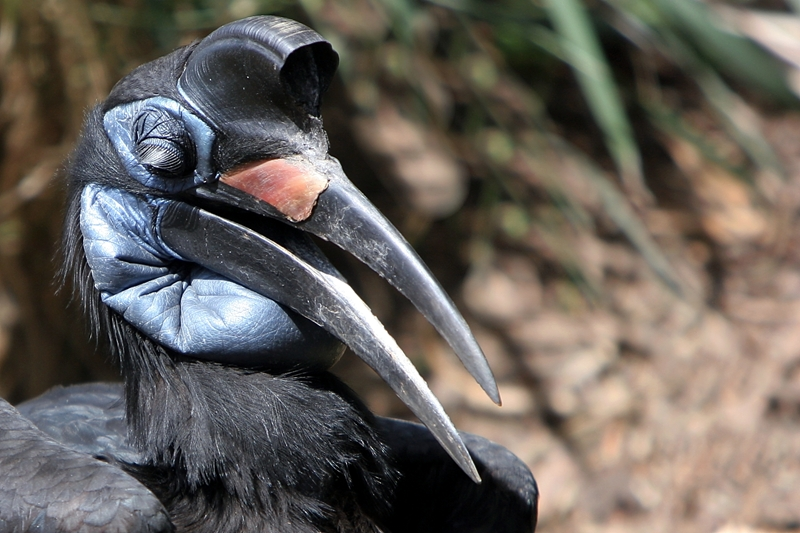
The species has long eyelashes as seen on this female identified by a blue throat pouch.

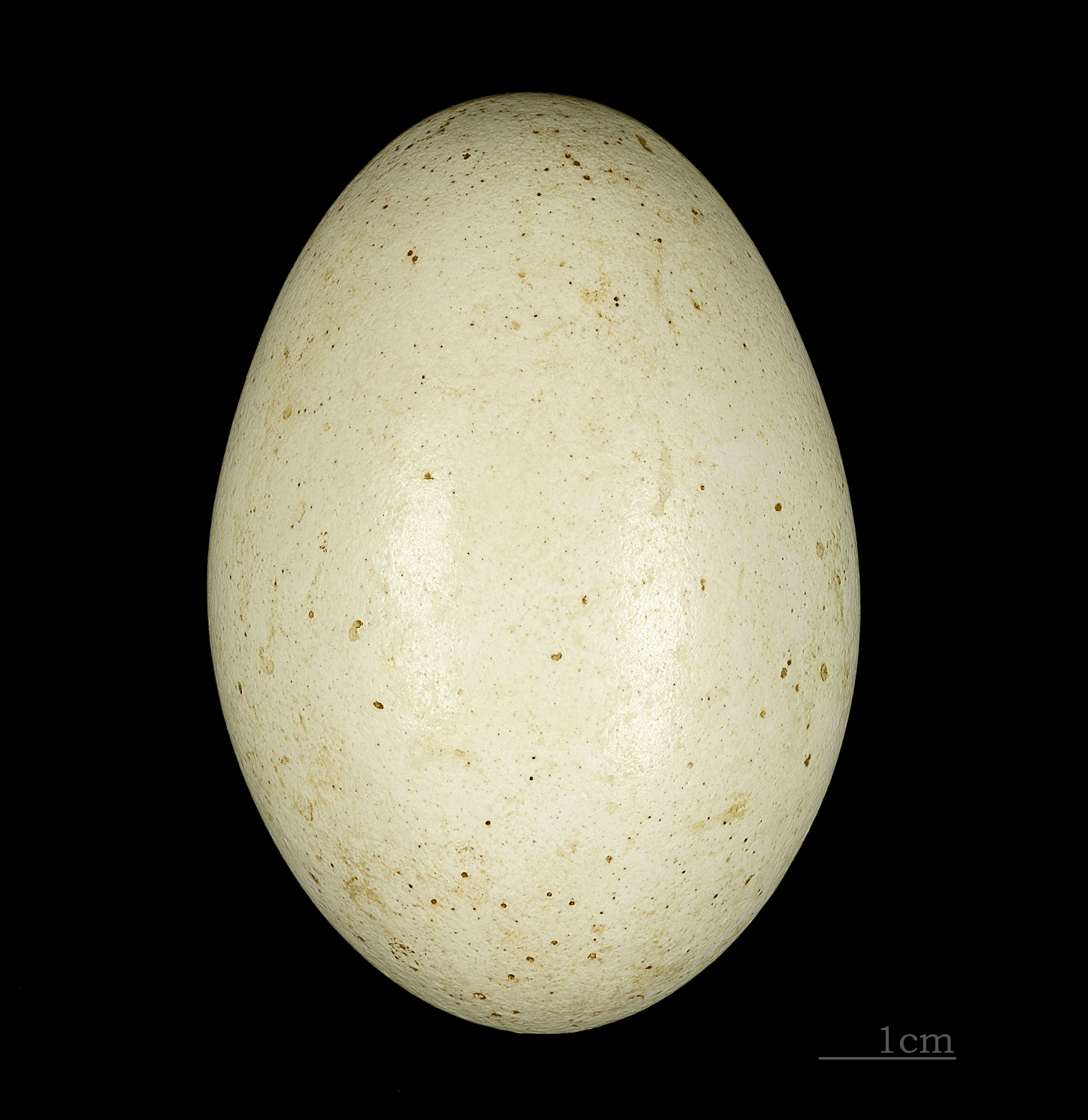
Egg from MHNT

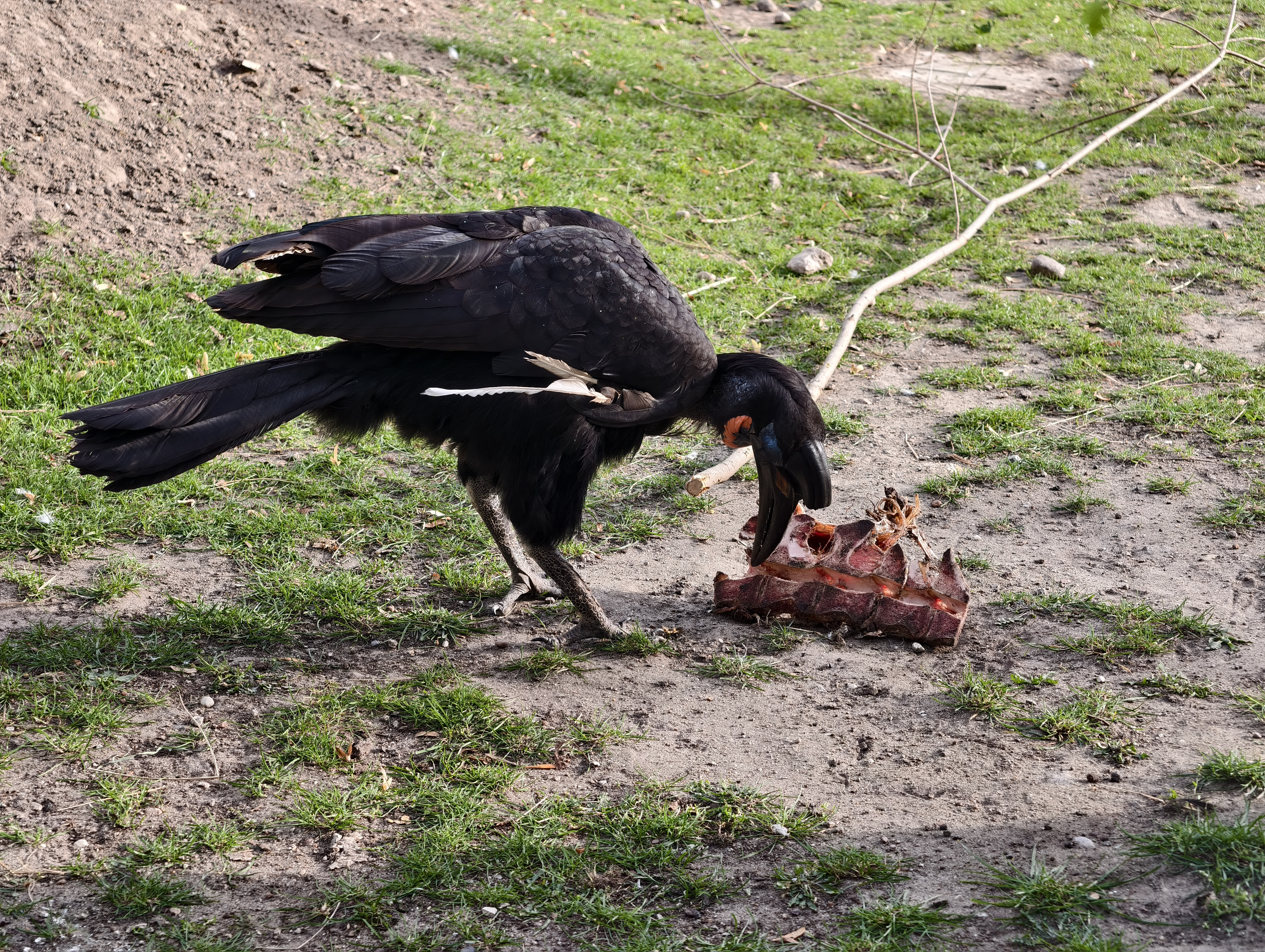
At Orientarium ZOO, Łódź, Poland
