= Bucorvus brailloni =

Bucorvus brailloni Temporal range: Middle Miocene

Scientific classification
- Kingdom: Animalia
- Phylum: Chordata
- Class: Aves
- Order: Bucerotiformes
- Family: Bucerotidae
- Genus: Bucorvus
- Species: †B. brailloni

Binomial name
- †Bucorvus brailloni (Brunet, 1971)

Extinct species of bird

Bucorvus brailloni is an extinct ground hornbill. The only known fossil is of a femur dated to the Middle Miocene. It was found in Morocco, well north of the range of extant ground hornbill species.
