= Leadbeater =

Leadbeater is a surname. Notable people with the surname include:

- Anne Leadbeater, Australian trauma recovery specialist
- Barrie Leadbeater (born 1943), English first-class cricketer and umpire
- Benjamin Leadbeater (1760–1837), British naturalist
- Charles Leadbeater, English author
- Charles Webster Leadbeater (1854–1934), English clergyman, theosophist and author
- Eddie Leadbeater (1927–2011), former English cricketer
- Elli Leadbeater, British ecologist and evolutionary biologist
- Harry Leadbeater (1863–1928), English amateur first-class cricketer
- James Leadbeater (born 1989), Welsh rugby union player
- Jo Leadbeater (1974–2016), married name Jo Cox, assassinated British politician, sister of Kim
- Kim Leadbeater (born 1976), British politician, sister of Jo
- Maire Leadbeater (born 1940s), New Zealand human rights and peace activist, writer, and former social worker
- Mary Leadbeater (1758–1826), Irish author

== See also ==
- Leadbetter (surname)
- Ledbetter (surname)
