= Leadbetter (surname) =

Leadbetter is a surname. Notable people and characters with the name include:

== People ==
- Daniel Parkhurst Leadbetter (1797–1870), a state senator in Ohio during the 1840s.
- Danville Leadbetter (1811–1866), a career United States Army officer and Confederate general during the American Civil War.
- Dave Leadbetter (1934–2006), a Scottish political figure.
- David Leadbetter (golf instructor) (born 1952), a leading golf instructor, originally from England and residing in the United States.
- Frederick Leadbetter (1875–1948), an American financier and lumber and paper milling executive.
- Jimmy Leadbetter (1928–2006), a Scottish footballer (soccer player).
- Phil Leadbetter (1962–2021), a leading player of the resonator guitar.
- Stan Leadbetter (1937–2013), English cricketer
- Stiff Leadbetter (c. 1705 – 1766) British architect and builder

== Fictional characters ==
- Jerry Leadbetter, a fictional character on the British television show The Good Life.
- Margo Leadbetter, a fictional character on the British television shows The Good Life and Life Beyond the Box: Margo Leadbetter.

== See also ==
- Leadbeater, surname
- Leadbitter, surname
- Ledbetter (surname)
