= John Leadbitter =

English footballer

Personal information
- Full name: John Leadbitter
- Date of birth: 7 May 1953
- Place of birth: Sunderland, England
- Position: Central defender

Youth career
- –: Sunderland

Senior career*
Years	Team	Apps	(Gls)
1970–1972	Sunderland	0	(0)
1972–1973	Darlington	19	(0)
- * Club domestic league appearances and goals

John Leadbitter (born 7 May 1953) is an English former footballer who played as a central defender in the Football League for Darlington. He began his senior career with Sunderland without playing for them in the League.
