= James Leadbeater =

Welsh rugby union footballer

- Born: James Leadbeater; 4 January 1989 (age 37) Panteg, Torfaen, Wales
- Height: 175 cm (5 ft 9 in)
- Weight: 88 kg (13 st 12 lb)

Rugby union career
Senior career
Years	Team	Apps	(Points)
2009–12	Newport GD	13	(0)

James Leadbeater (born 4 January 1989, Panteg) is a Welsh rugby union player. He is a Wales under 20 international.

A scrum half, he played for Cross Keys RFC and progressed through the Newport Gwent Dragons academy. He made his debut for the Dragons regional team 20 December 2009 against Biarritz Olympique in the Heineken Cup.

He was released by Newport Gwent Dragons at the end of the 2011–12 season and joined Newport RFC
