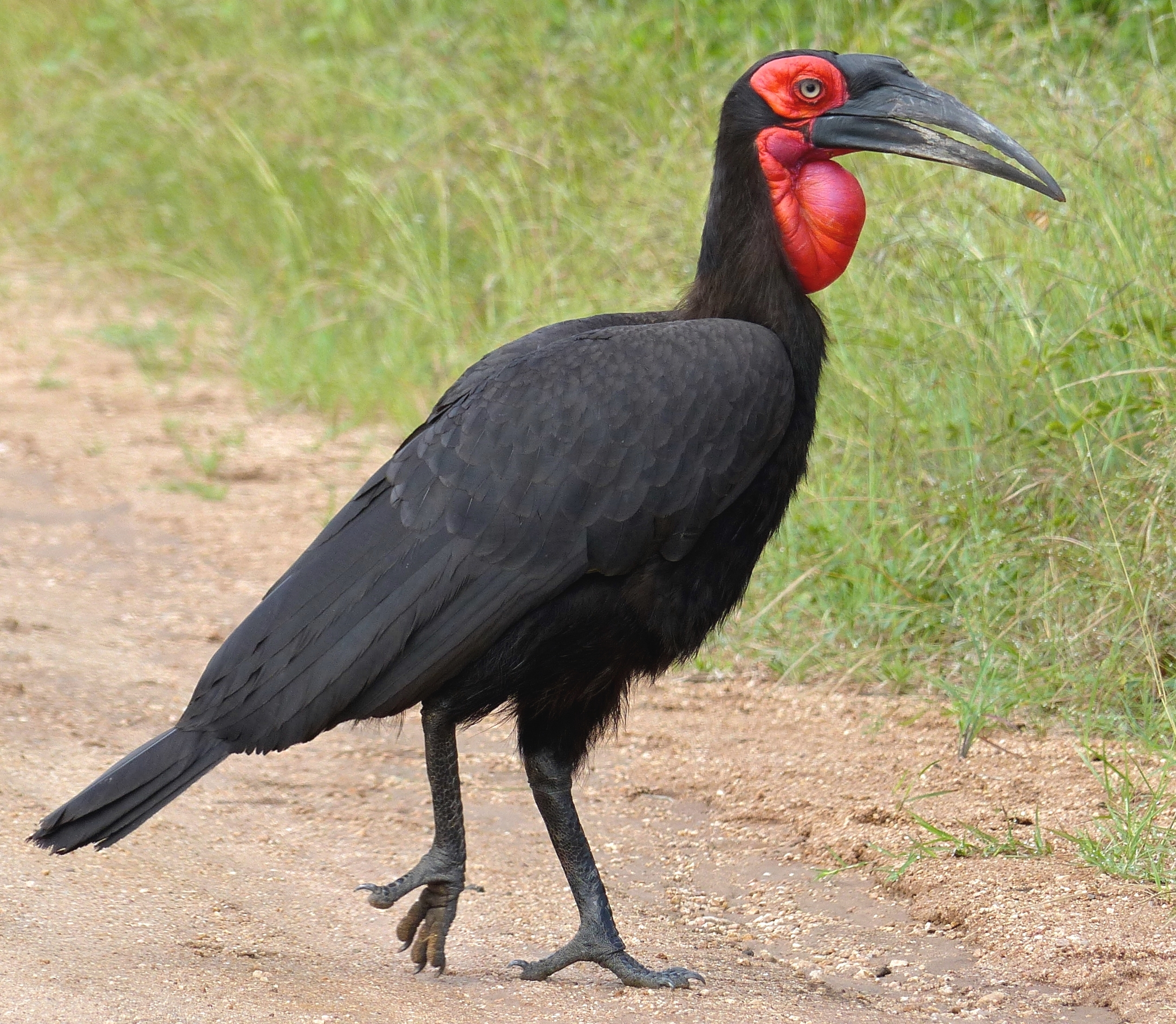

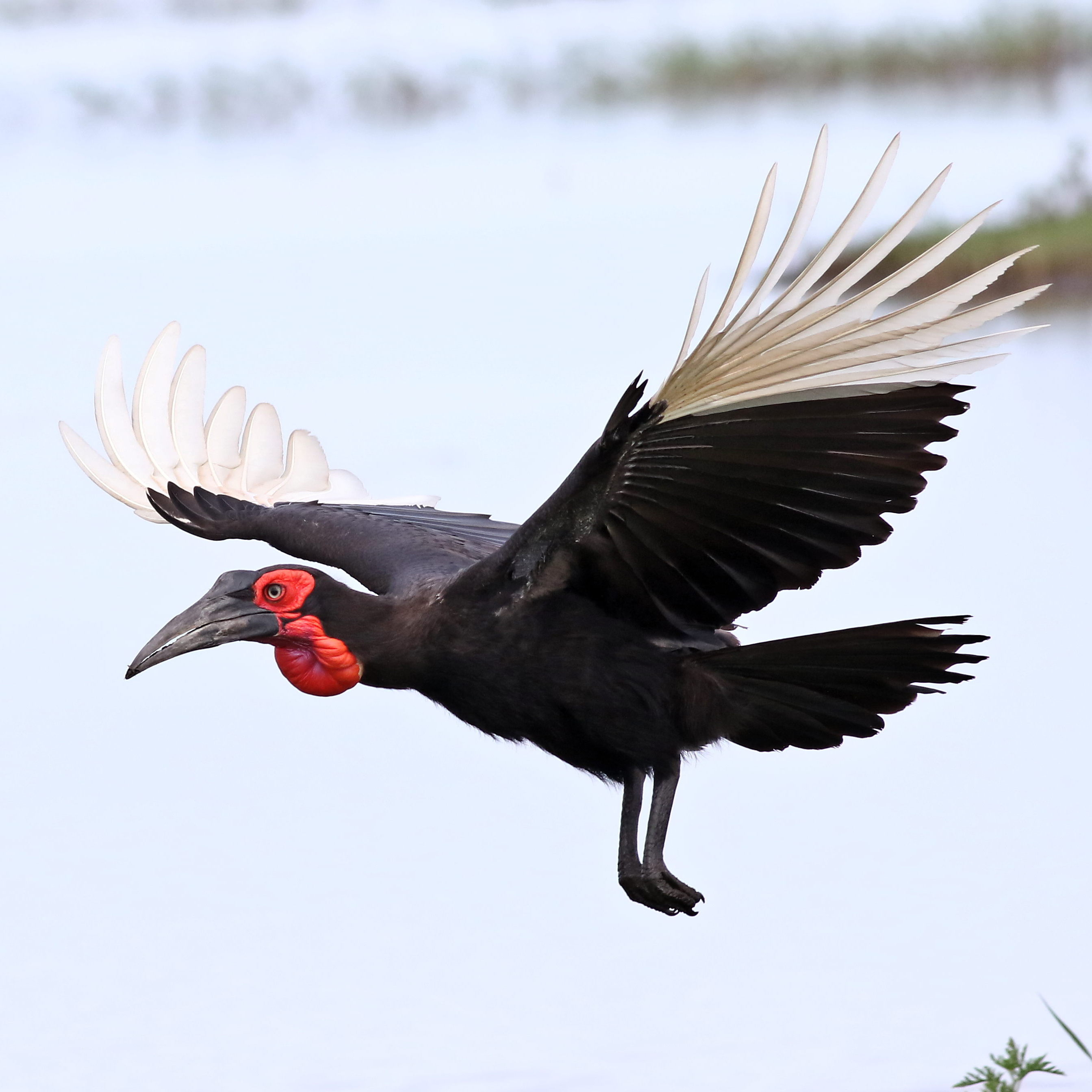
- Adult male, walking and in flight

Conservation status
- Vulnerable (IUCN 3.1)

Scientific classification
- Kingdom: Animalia
- Phylum: Chordata
- Class: Aves
- Order: Bucerotiformes
- Family: Bucerotidae
- Genus: Bucorvus
- Species: B. leadbeateri

Binomial name
- Bucorvus leadbeateri (Vigors, 1825)
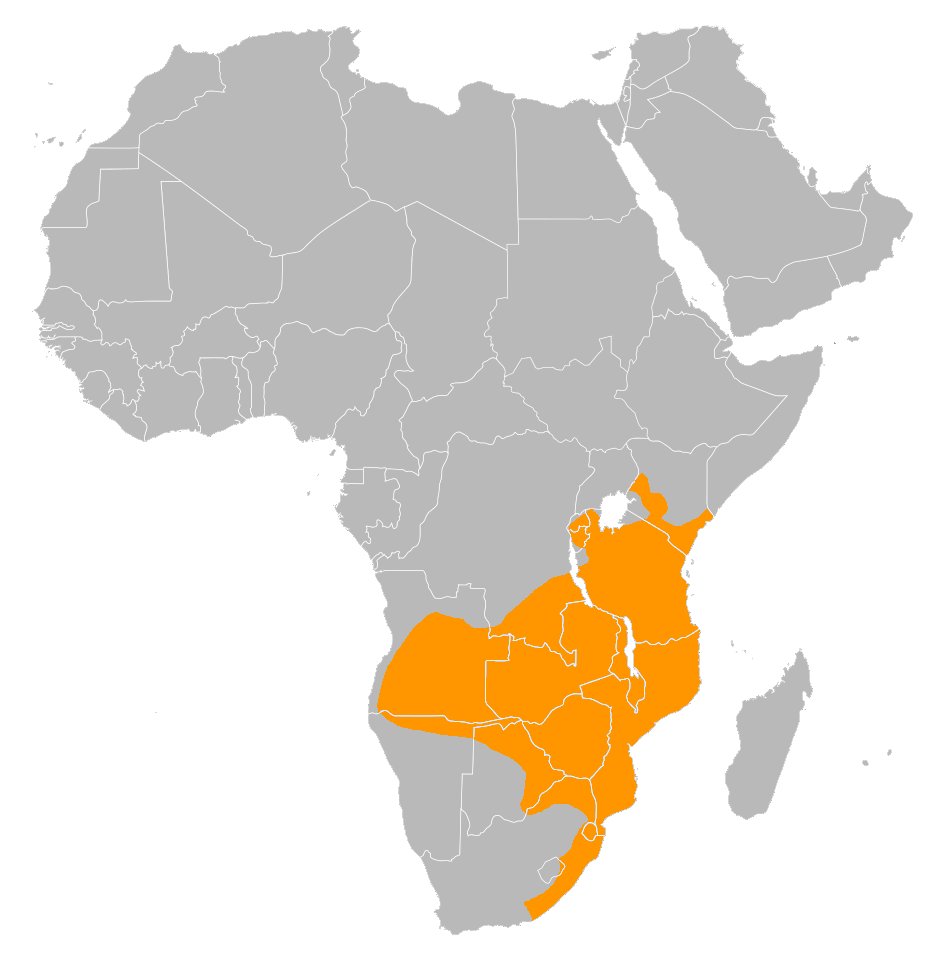
- Approximate range

Synonyms
- Bucorvus cafer (Schlegel, 1862)

= Southern ground hornbill =

Species of bird

The southern ground hornbill (Bucorvus leadbeateri) is one of two species of ground hornbill, both of which are found solely within Africa, and is the largest species in the hornbill order worldwide. It can be found in the southern regions of Africa, ranging from Kenya to South Africa. Within these regions, they inhabit both woodlands and savannas. The other species of the genus Bucorvus is the Abyssinian ground hornbill, B. abyssinicus.

Southern ground hornbills are carnivorous and hunt mostly on the ground. Their food ranges from insects to small vertebrates. Their nests are often found in high tree cavities or other shallow cavities, such as rock holes in cliff faces. These birds are a long-lived species, having lifespans in the range of 50–60 years, and up to 70 in captivity. In relation to their long lives, they do not reach sexual maturity until 4–6 years old, and begin breeding around 10 years old. Their sex can be identified by the colour of their throats: the male's is pure red and the female's is a deep violet-blue.

Southern ground hornbills are a culturally pervasive and important species in southern Africa. Kruger National Park, located within South Africa, lists southern ground hornbills as one of their 'Big Six' bird species. However, their numbers have been declining, due in part to persecution, habitat destruction, cultural beliefs, and other factors. They are listed globally as 'Vulnerable' by the IUCN as of 2018, and as 'Endangered' in South Africa, Lesotho, Namibia and Eswatini.

== Description ==
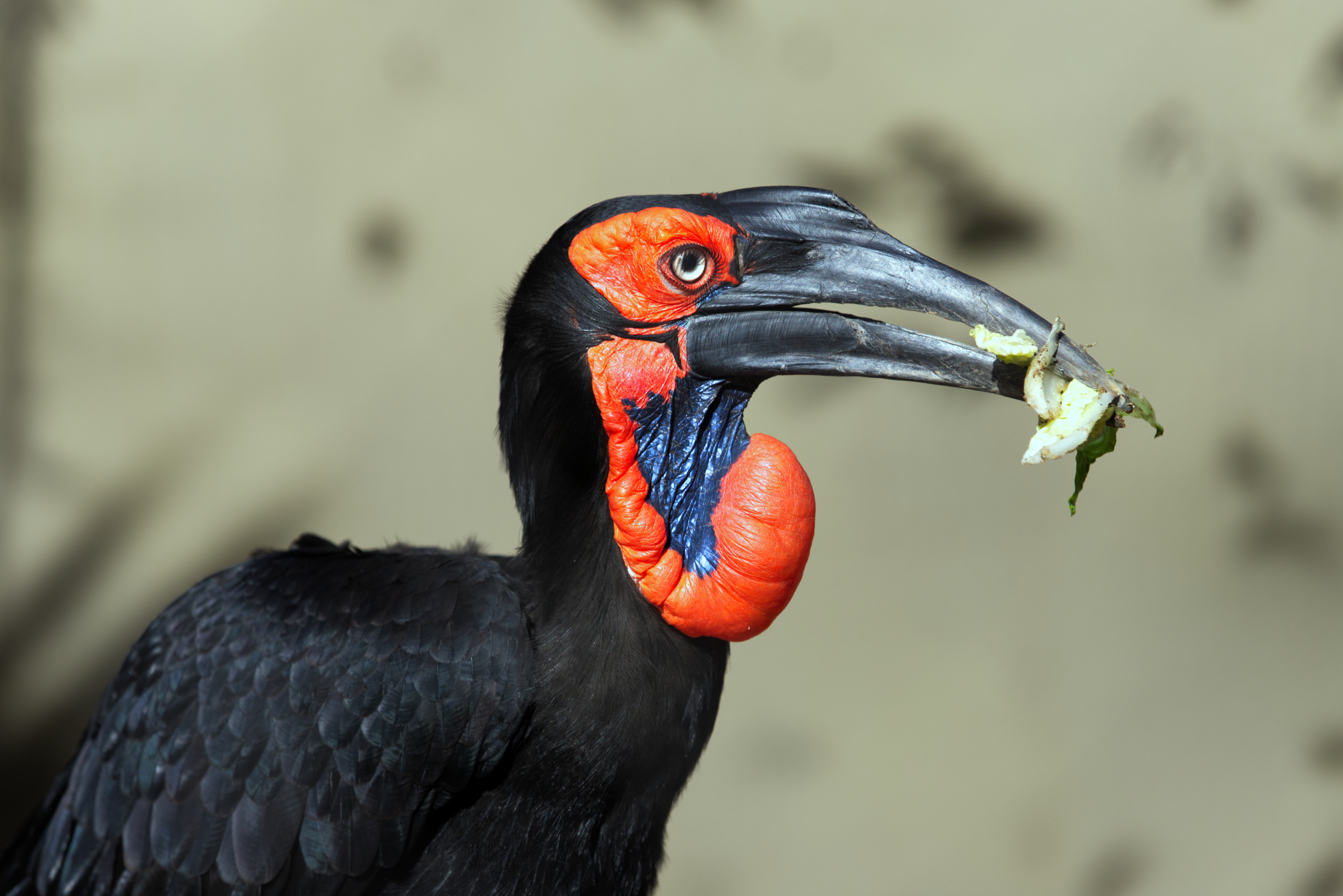
Close-Up of Southern Ground Hornbill

This is a large bird, at 90 to 129 cm (2 ft 11 in to 4 ft 3 in) long. Females weigh 2.2 to 4.6 kilograms (4.9 to 10.1 lb), while the larger males weigh 3.5 to 6.2 kilograms (7.7 to 13.7 lb). The average weight of eight females was 3.34 kg (7.4 lb) whilst that of eight males was 4.2 kg (9.3 lb); thus they average around 35% percent heavier than any Asian hornbill species. Wingspan is from 1.2 to 1.8 m (3 ft 11 in to 5 ft 11 in). The wing chord is 49.5 to 61.8 cm (19.5 to 24.3 in), the tail from 29 to 36 cm (11 to 14 in), the tarsus from 13 to 15.5 cm (5.1 to 6.1 in) and the culmen from 16.8 to 22.1 cm (6.6 to 8.7 in). Stevenson and Fanshawe report that the Abyssinian ground hornbill is the larger species on average, at 110 cm (43 in), than the southern species, at 102 cm (40 in), but published maximum weights and standard measurements indicate the southern species is slightly larger. Average weights are not known for the Abyssinian species.

The southern ground hornbill is black with vivid red patches of bare skin on the face and throat (yellow in juvenile birds)—as well as being one of few birds with eyelashes—which are believed to keep dust out of the birds' eyes while they forage during the dry season. The white tips of the wings (primary feathers) seen in flight are another diagnostic characteristic. The beak is black and slightly curved and presents a casque, more developed in males. Female southern ground hornbills are smaller and have violet-blue skin on their throats. Juveniles to six years old lack the prominent red pouch, having a duller patch of grey in its place.

== Habitat and diet ==
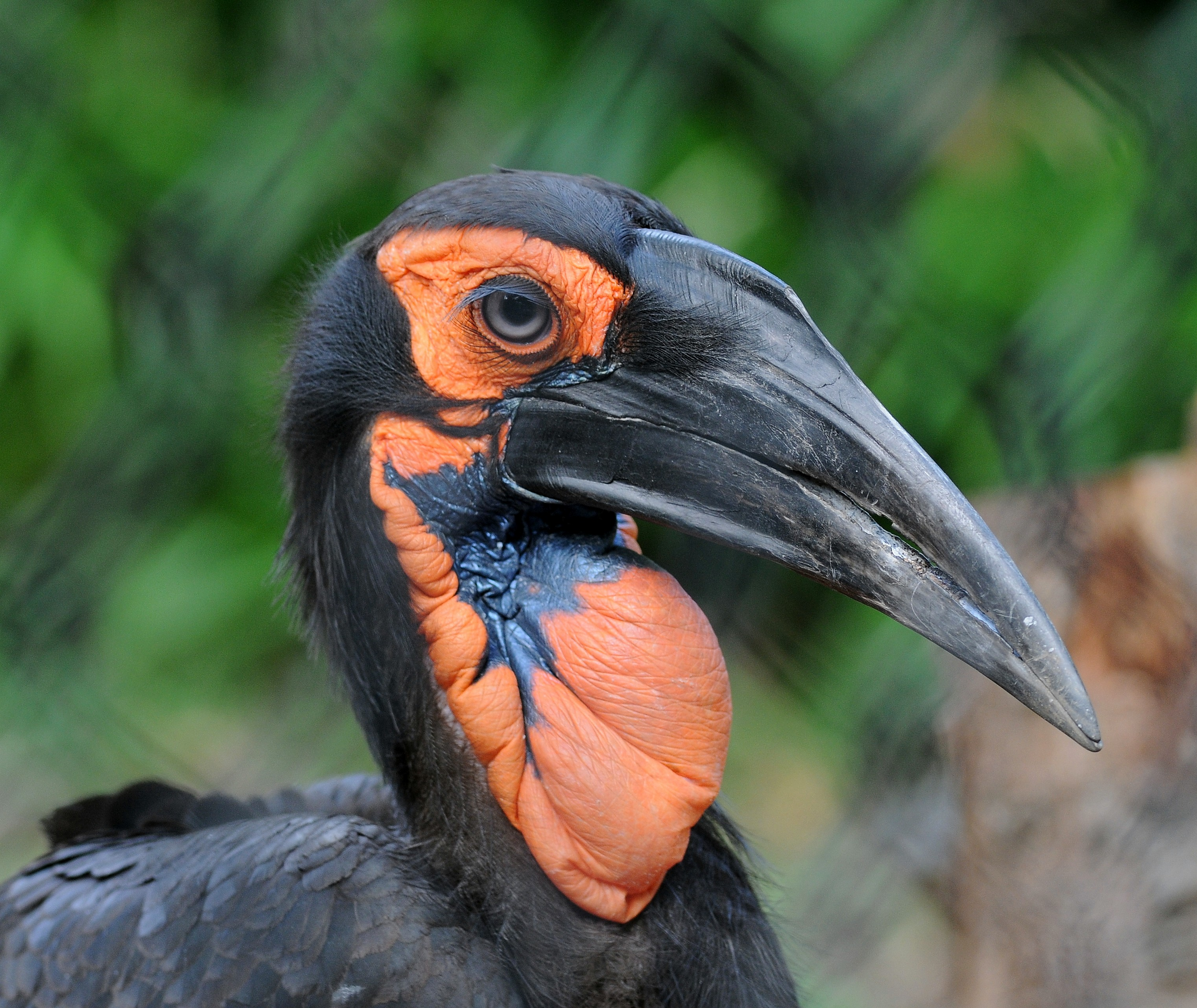
Head of female at Philadelphia Zoo

Southern ground hornbills can be found from northern Namibia and Angola to northern South Africa and southern Zimbabwe to Burundi and Kenya. They require a savanna habitat with large trees for nesting and dense but short grass for foraging.

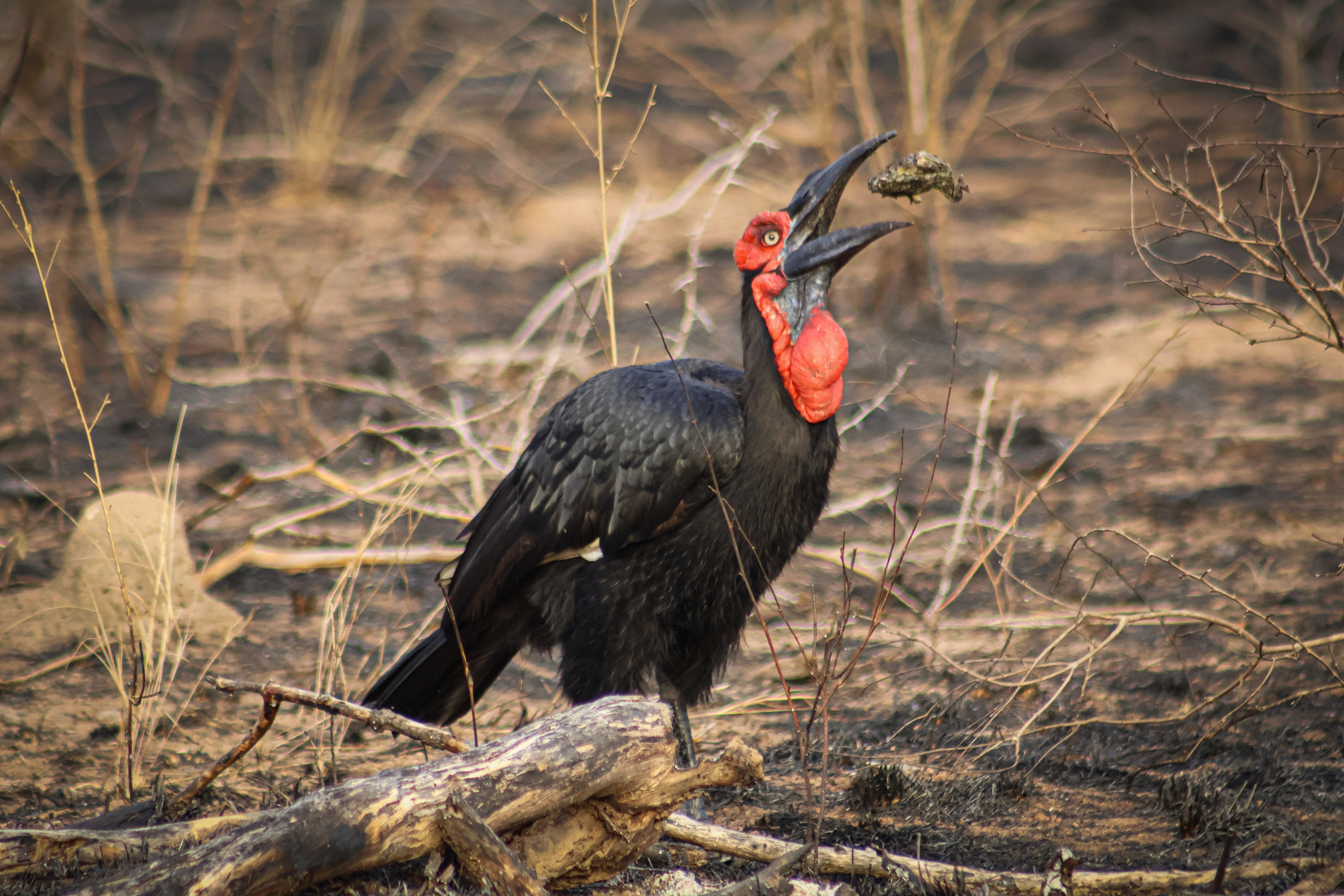
A adult female Southern Ground Hornbill attempting to eat a petrified frog in Kruger National Park.

The southern ground hornbill is a vulnerable species, mainly confined to national reserves and national parks. They live in groups of 5 to 10 individuals including adults and juveniles. Often, neighbouring groups engage in aerial pursuits. These birds are apex predator and thus ecologically important. They forage on the ground, where they feed on reptiles, frogs, snails, insects and mammals up to the size of hares. Southern ground hornbills rarely drink. Their range is limited at its western end by the lack of trees in which to build nests.

Southern ground hornbill groups are very vocal: contact is made by calls in chorus which can usually be heard at distances of up to 3 kilometres (1.86 mi). The calls allow each group to maintain its territory, which must be as large as 100 square kilometres (40 mi^{2}) even in the best habitat.

== Breeding and life cycle ==
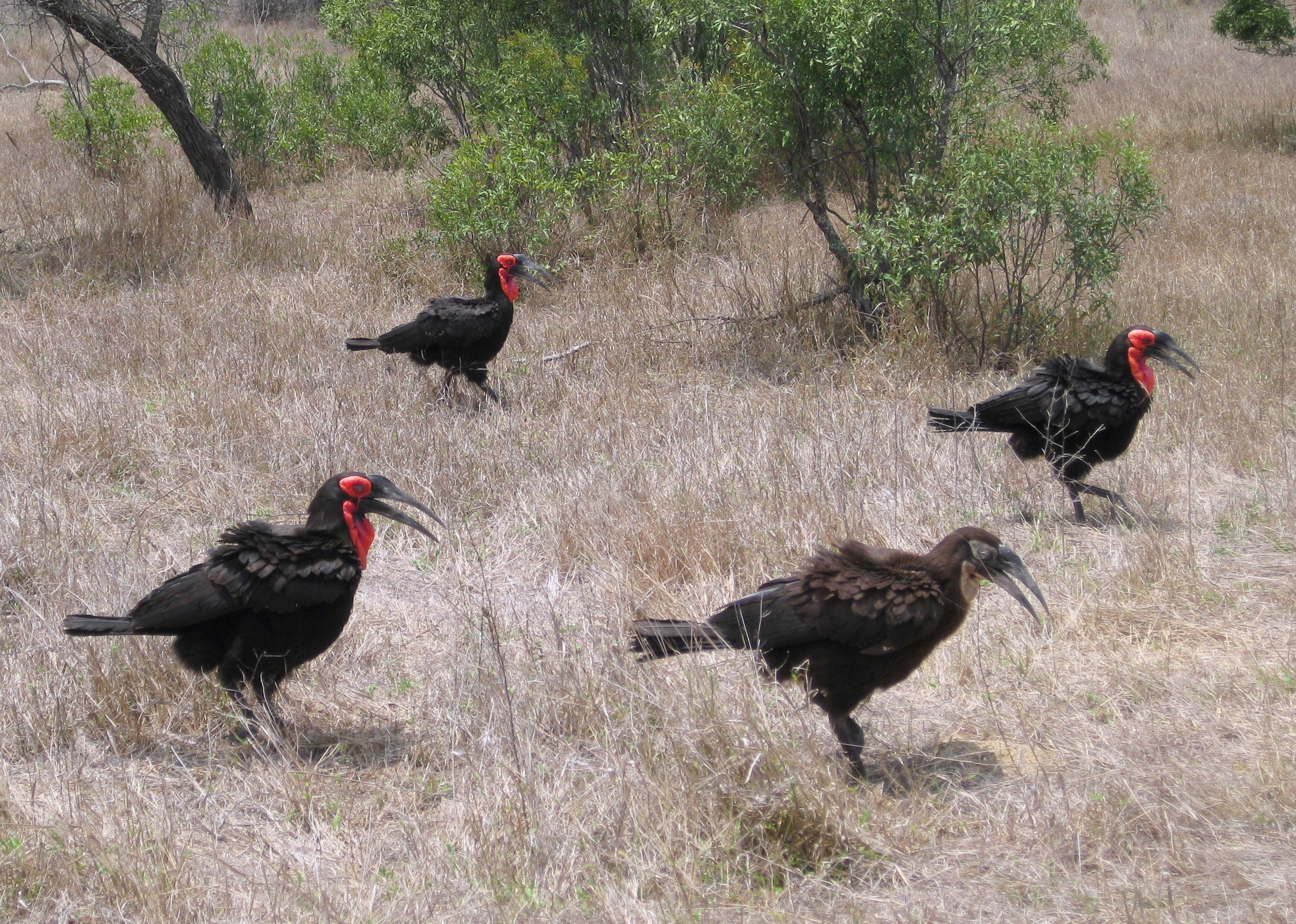
A family group foraging in dry savanna before the rains

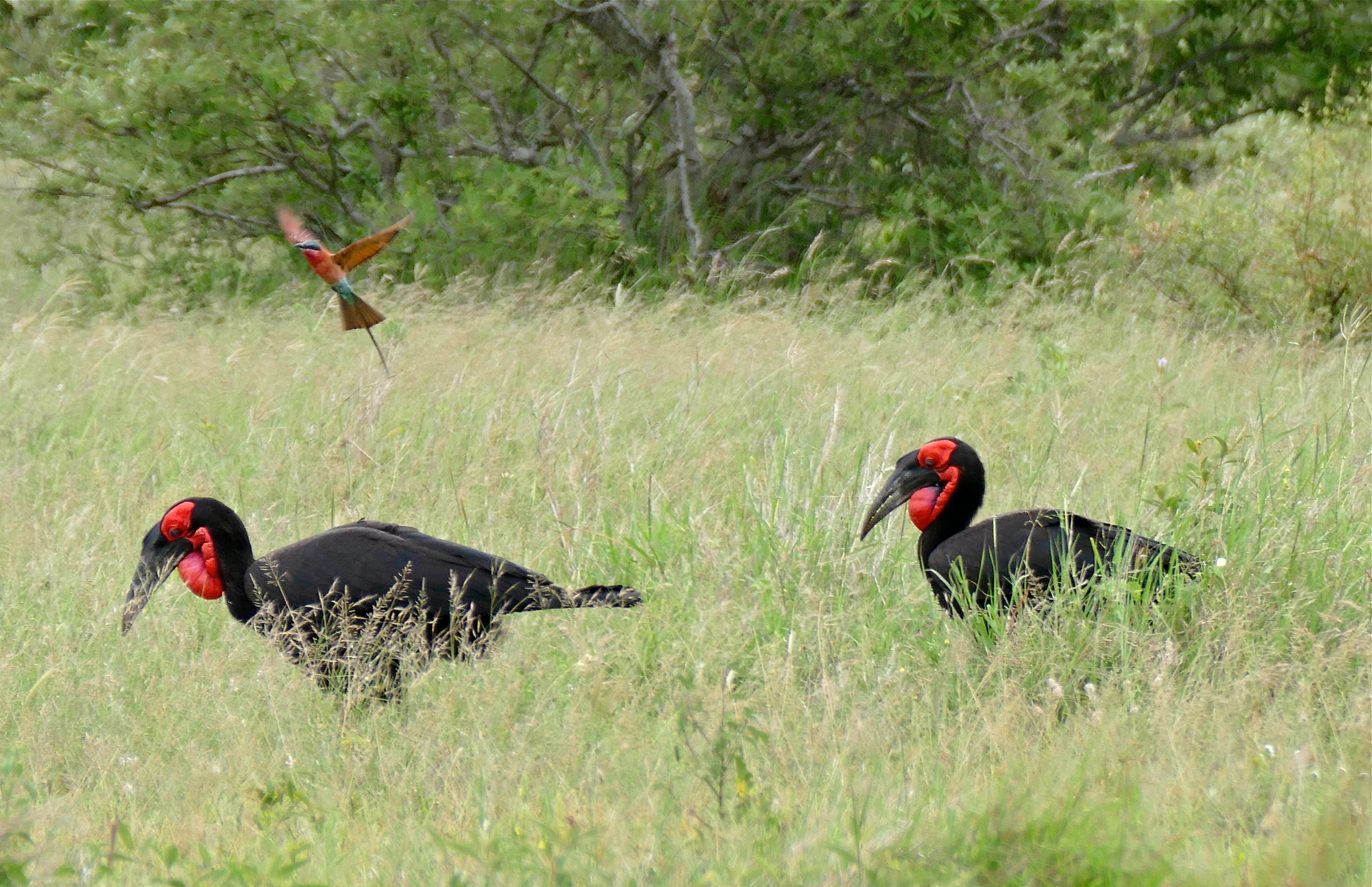
A foraging breeding pair followed by a carmine bee-eater

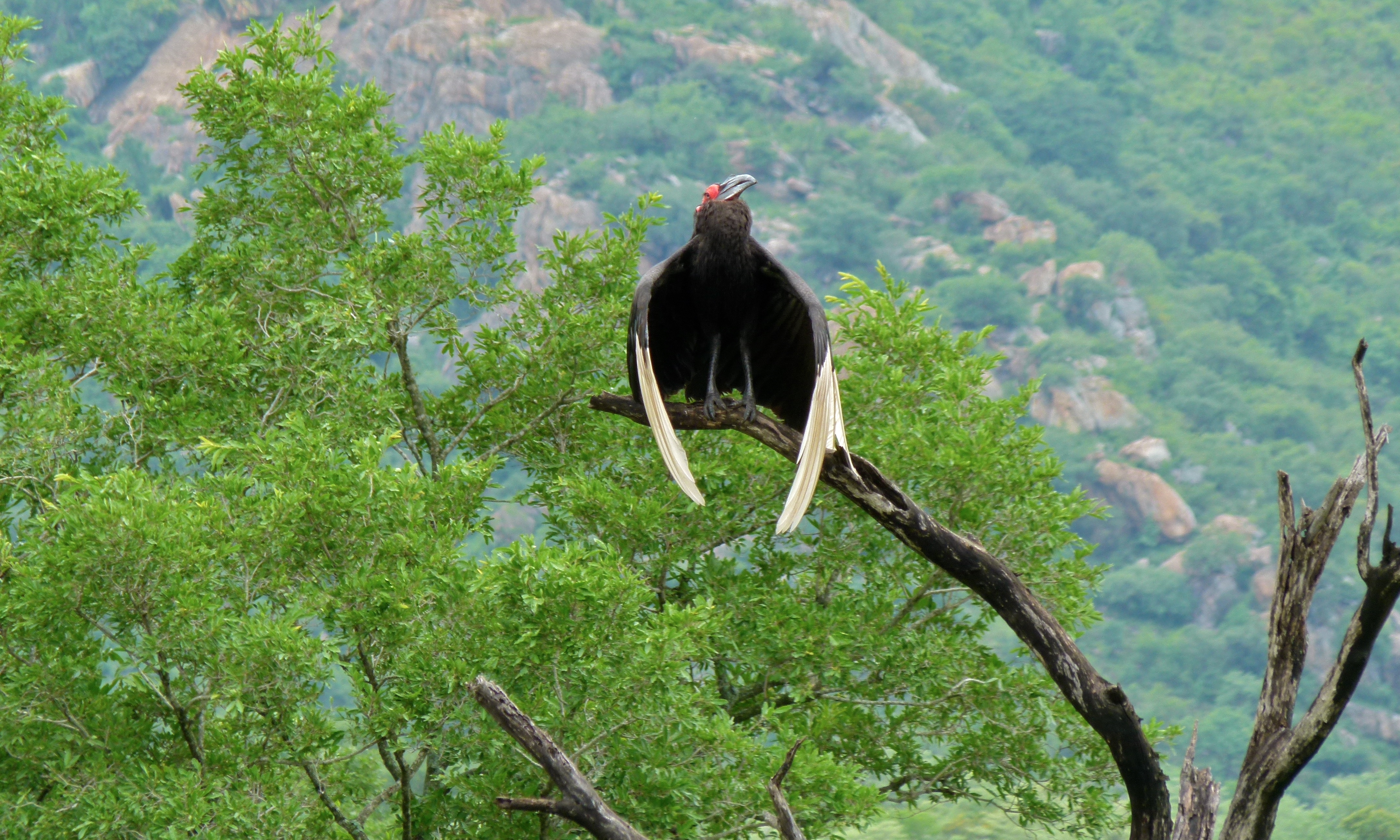
Call display from a tree perch, December

The southern ground hornbill is an obligate cooperative breeder, with each breeding pair always assisted by at least two other birds. Experiments in captivity have found that birds without six years experience as helpers at the nest are unable to breed successfully if they do become breeders. This suggests that unaided pairs cannot rear young and that the skill gained in helping as a juvenile is essential for rearing young as an adult.

In captivity, a maximum lifespan of 70 years is recorded, and it is generally believed that the life expectancy of a bird that survives long enough to fledge is as high as thirty years or more, which is comparable to that of more famously long-lived birds like the wandering albatross.

Ground hornbills are believed to reach maturity at six to seven years, but very few breed at this age. Nests are almost always deep hollows in very old trees, though there exist reports ground hornbills have on occasions nested on rock faces. One to three eggs are laid at the beginning of the wet season, but siblicide ensures that only one nestling is ever fledged. The eggs measure 73 millimetres (2.87 in) by 56 millimetres (2.20 in) and are pure white in colour but very rough in texture.

After a 40 to 45-day incubation period and an 85-day fledging period, the young remain dependent on their parents and helpers for between one and two years depending on climatic conditions, longer than any other bird. This means that ground hornbills can normally breed successfully only every third year. Triennial breeding is rare in birds: probably the only other example is the ornate hawk-eagle of Neotropical rainforests.

== Conservation ==
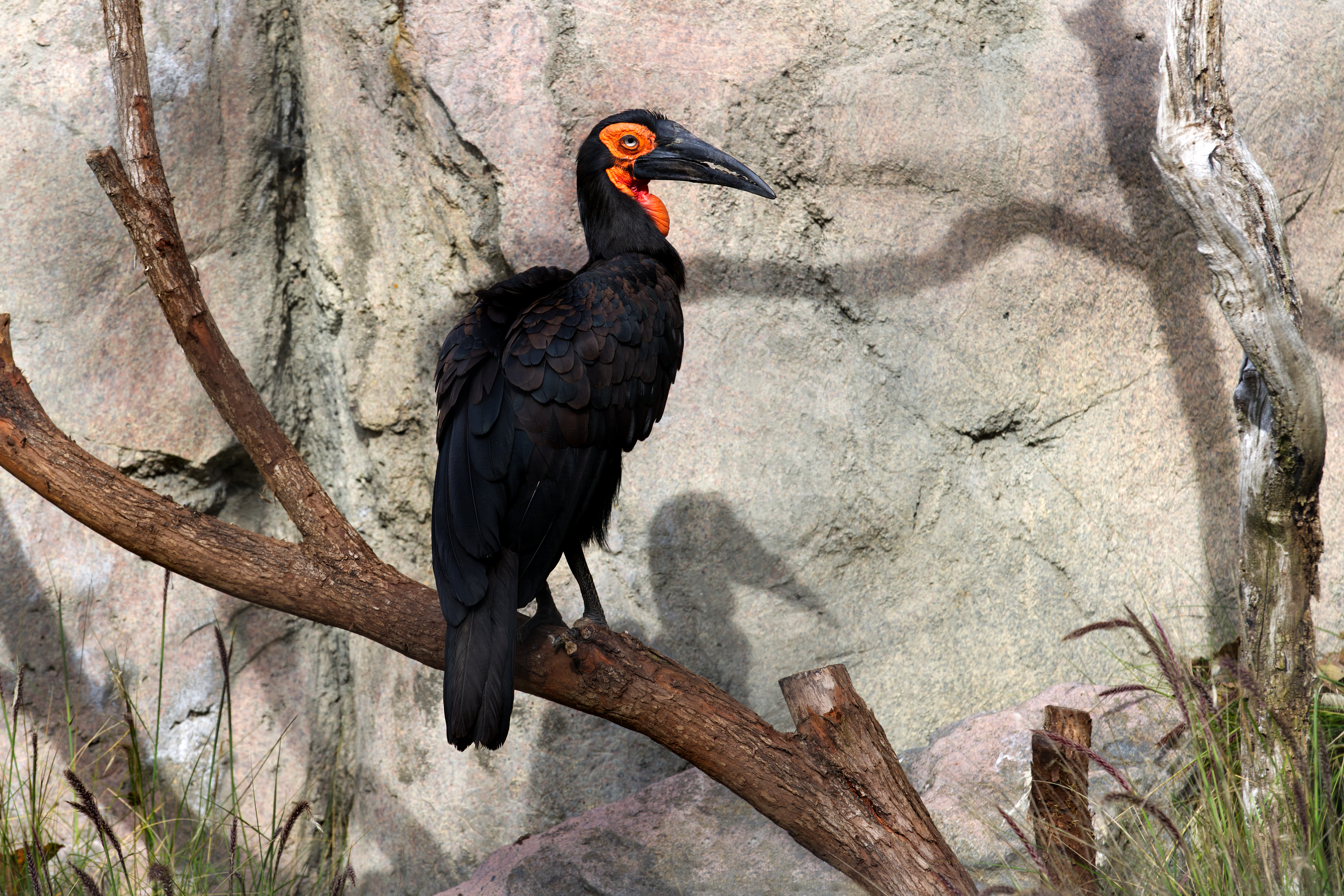
Southern Ground Hornbill perched on a tree

The southern ground hornbill is classed as vulnerable to extinction globally; however, in South Africa, where most studies on the species have been carried out, it is listed as endangered. They have also been classified as endangered in Lesotho, Namibia and Swaziland. Southern ground hornbills in these countries, along with Kenya, Tanzania, Malawi, Zambia, Zimbabwe, and Mozambique, require conservation interventions to help increase their numbers. The bird's classification as endangered is heavily tied to its slow reproductive rates. Habitat loss, changes due to the agriculture, deforestation, electrocution from power lines, accidental poisoning, and persecution are the major factors that affect their populations.

Persecution and hunting of the southern ground hornbill by human populations have continued to be complex issues. Recent studies have found the species has been hunted more than previously believed, including in protected areas. The majority of this hunting has likely been opportunistic. Overall, hunting is likely not a key driver for their lowering numbers. However, it is still a factor of which to be aware when considering conservation efforts, especially because of their low reproductive rates and an incomplete knowledge about local hunting habits in their natural regions. Furthermore, the southern ground hornbill faces persecution due to behaviors like destroying windows in response to seeing its reflection. Annoyed homeowners in urban areas in South Africa have been known to kill birds that destroy property.

The role of southern ground hornbills in a variety of cultural beliefs also influence conservation efforts. Some of these beliefs benefit their preservation. An example is the Ndebele, who believe killing southern ground hornbills is taboo due to their negative associations. However, the birds are also used in traditional cultural practices and medicines which can be harmful. In some marketplaces and cultures, southern ground hornbills are used in traditional medicines, which often rely upon harvesting specific parts of the bird. To date, research suggests that cultural uses do not have a significant impact on their populations. For example, the Ndebele healers use the bird for traditional medicine, but must follow a strict ritual process that could take months or years to prepare. Additional research documents plant alternatives to southern ground hornbill use for cultural belief uses. While investigation into traditional medicine trade of the southern ground hornbill has occurred, the bushmeat trade remains poorly understood, and it has only been seen to occur in areas of Malawi.

This bird species is especially threatened by the loss of trees and general habitat loss, as they require vast amounts of space for their territories. The removal of large trees for agriculture or wood harvesting, disturbances near nesting grounds, agricultural changes, all deeply affect the ability of southern ground hornbills to flourish. Due to the encroachment of human populations, it is not unheard of to see a group's territory encompass a variety of areas, from pristine habitats to commercial agricultural lands.

Southern ground hornbills can have clutches ranging from one to three eggs, but only one of these are raised. With only one egg being raised, conservationists have taken it as an opportunity to raise the remaining eggs in captivity. Rehabilitation projects, such the Mabula Ground Hornbill Project, have been hand-rearing these extra chicks with the goal of reintroducing them to the wild, although reintroducing this species has proven challenging.

Southern ground hornbill in a Tokyo zoo, 2009

== In culture ==
The southern ground hornbill's loud voice and large size have made it a focal point in many traditional African cultures. They have inspired a variety of cultural beliefs throughout many peoples that are within its broad historical range. However, the extent of these beliefs and whether they will persist into the future are uncertain, especially due to the modernization of Africa.

=== Associations with death ===
In several cultures, the southern ground hornbill is associated with death and unluckiness. Broadly speaking, some view them as a sign, or bringer, of death, destruction, loss, and deprivation. These beliefs have been most prevalent in South Africa, Zimbabwe, and Malawi and are spread across many countries and peoples. Some residents of Burundi, Kenya, Tanzania, Zambia, and Mozambique associate the bird as "[an] unlucky and an aggressive bird associated with evil and death." Some in Tanzania also believe it to host angry spirits. Others in Zimbabwe believe it can bring misfortune and should not be approached. This has led to a range of reactions to the southern ground hornbill, from avoidance to killing.

For example, the Taveta people have a cultural belief that killing a southern ground will bring a fatal illness upon anyone who does so. For the Ndebele people, killing them is considered taboo and will bring death upon the killer. Furthermore, the Ndebele believe an elderly person will die if a southern ground hornbill comes near the home. The AmaXhosa people also have a taboo against killing them, as they may be messengers of death sent by a witch-doctor. In Namibia if you want to become rich, witch doctor is sending you to bring him this bird which is very rare to find.

=== Associations with weather ===
The southern ground hornbill is well known for its associations with rain, drought, lightning and general weather forecasts. It is believed by some, such as the Ndebele and those who live in coastal Tanzania, that its early morning calls are a sign of rain. Cultures such as the Xhosa believe the southern ground hornbill can be used to bring rain and end droughts.

This association has led the southern ground hornbill to be attributed with the ability to provide protection from weather-related problems. It is believed that if the proper traditional ritual is used, the bird can protect against lightning and drought. Rituals differ per culture and necessity for protection, as such a variety of parts may be needed from the bird, and may also involve dancing and singing. This particular usage has been seen within areas of South Africa and Mozambique.

Due to their association with rain and drought, some cultures rely upon the southern ground hornbill as a timekeeper as well. They can mark both seasonal and daily changes, such as a change from the wet to dry season. Slight variations are found country to country. In Malawi, some believe that sightings of southern ground hornbills means the fields should be prepared. Some in Kenya and Tanzania use the bird as a marker for the dry season and thus time when to move cattle. Within areas of South Africa, their calls are associated with the start of the rainy season. These beliefs generally do not carry harmful consequences for southern ground hornbills, but killing, displacing, or otherwise using them to end or start rainy seasons has been reported. Those that claim to rely upon it for determining the weather have blamed climate change for confused predictions, claiming it affects the hornbill's ability to call out at the traditional time.

=== Associations with altered perceptions ===
Possibly influenced by the southern ground hornbill ability to spot and hunt small creatures within tall grass, it has been associated with the ability to alter human perceptions. Though traditional rituals, the bird can be called on to improve or change a human's ability to alter reality, create illusions, and expand awareness. In Zimbabwe, Malawi and South Africa the bird can be used in attempts to improve a human's ability to find food, creatures and even enemies. Furthermore, it's believed by some that the southern ground hornbill can be used to alter the perceptions of oneself. Thus, it has lent itself to be used in rituals to provide authority for leaders in certain cultures.

Other cultural uses or beliefs include ridding one of bad or evil spirits, taking revenge on others or instigating fights, empowering a person, and causing dreams to become reality.

== Gallery ==
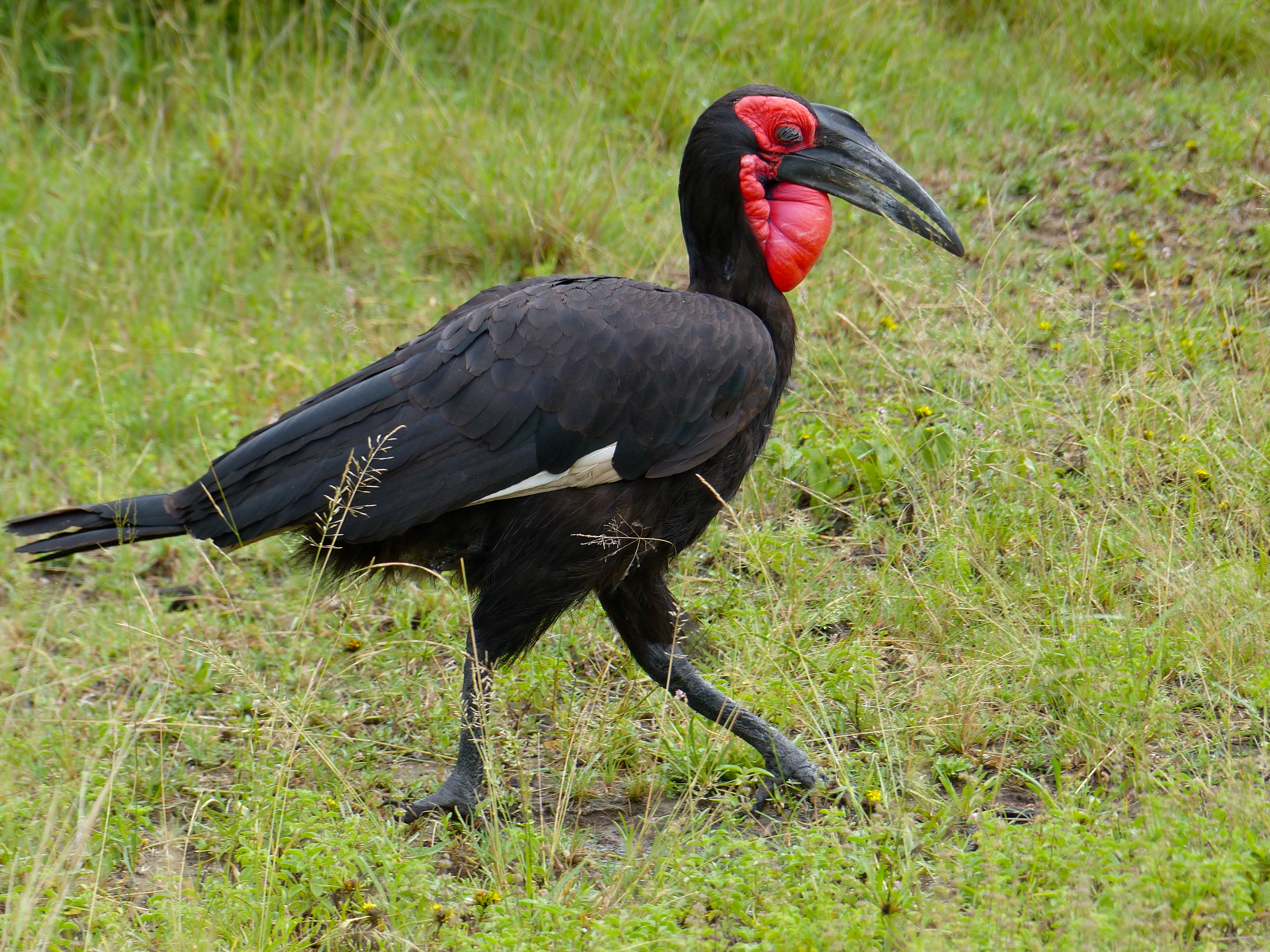
A foraging male

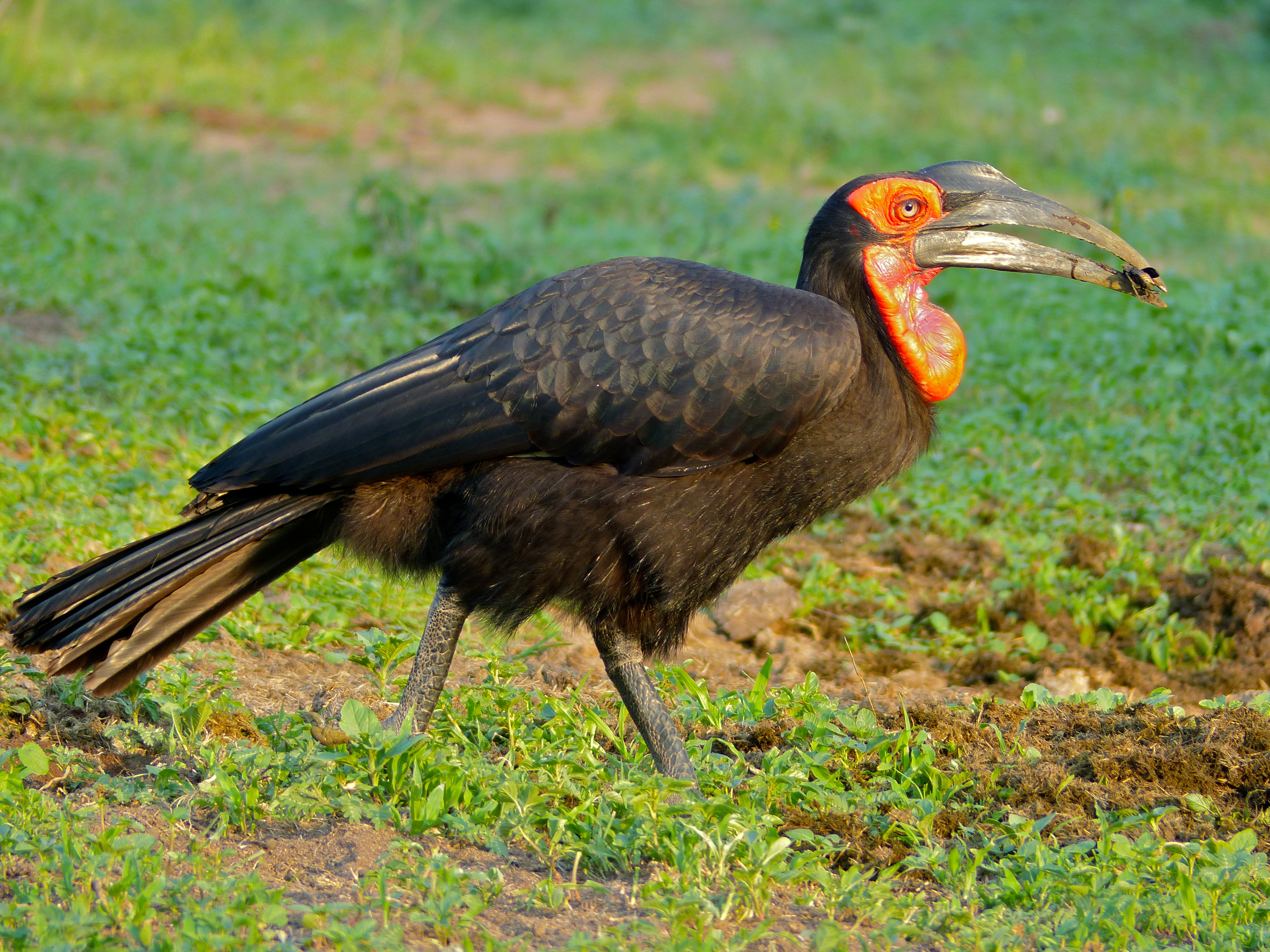
Catching beetles in dung

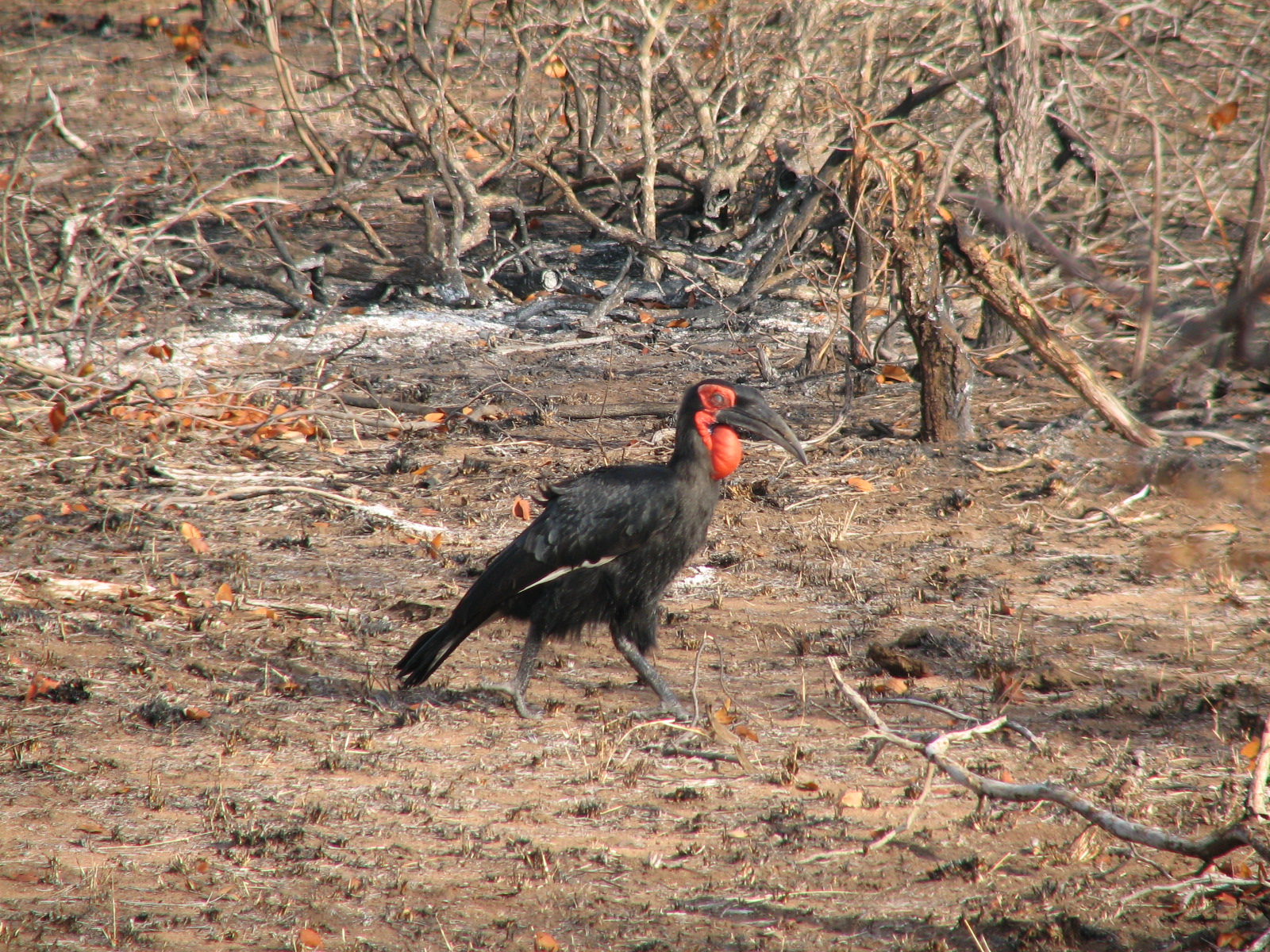
Foraging after a burn

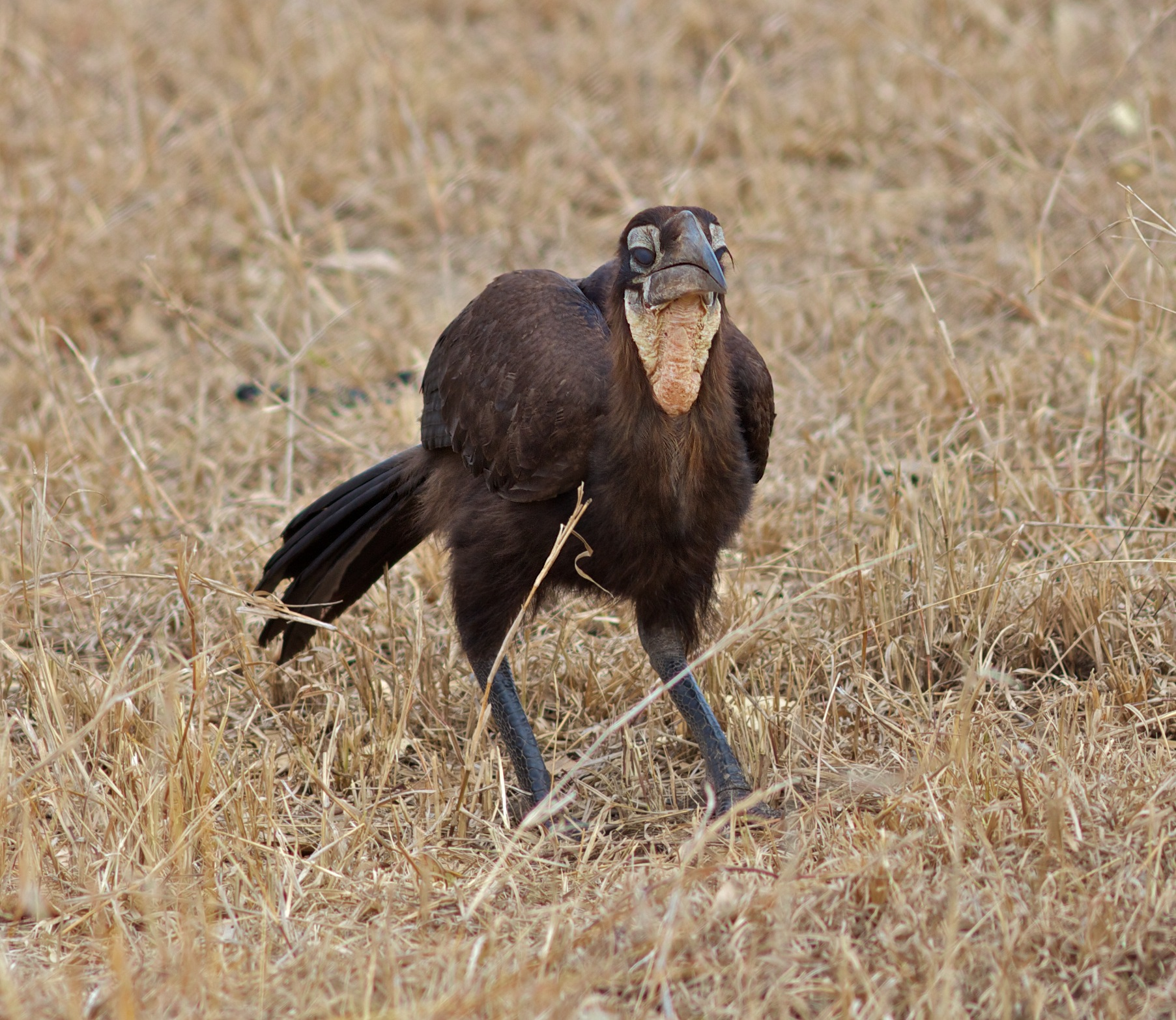
Juvenile bird with pale facial skin

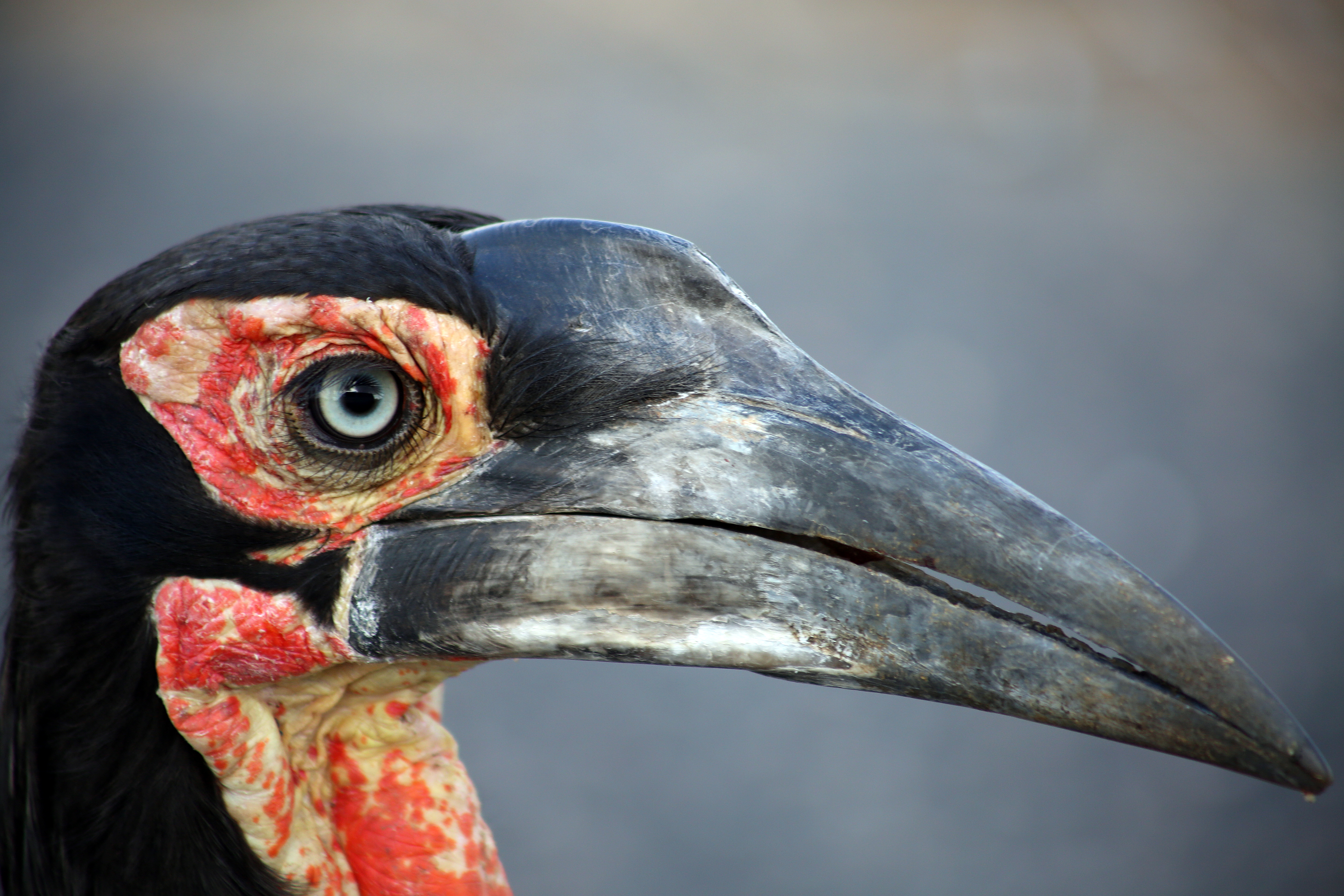
Head of an immature bird

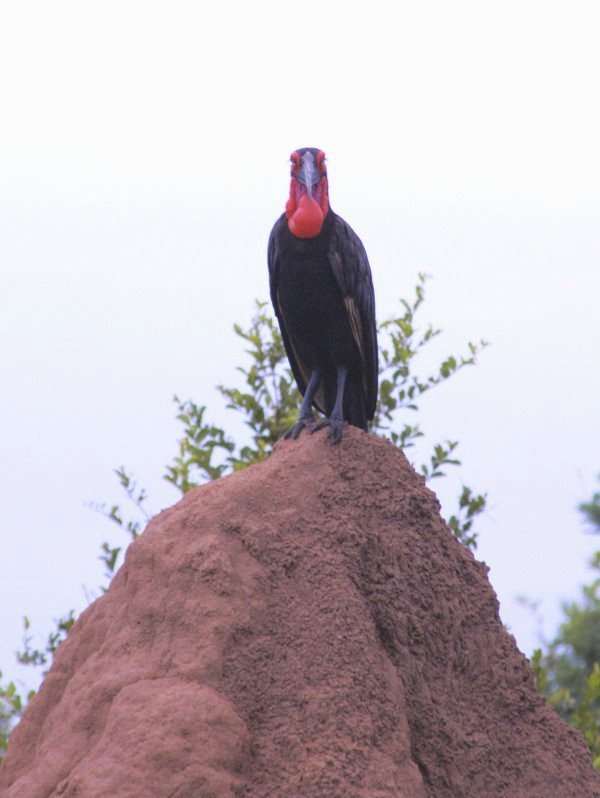
Perched on a termite mound

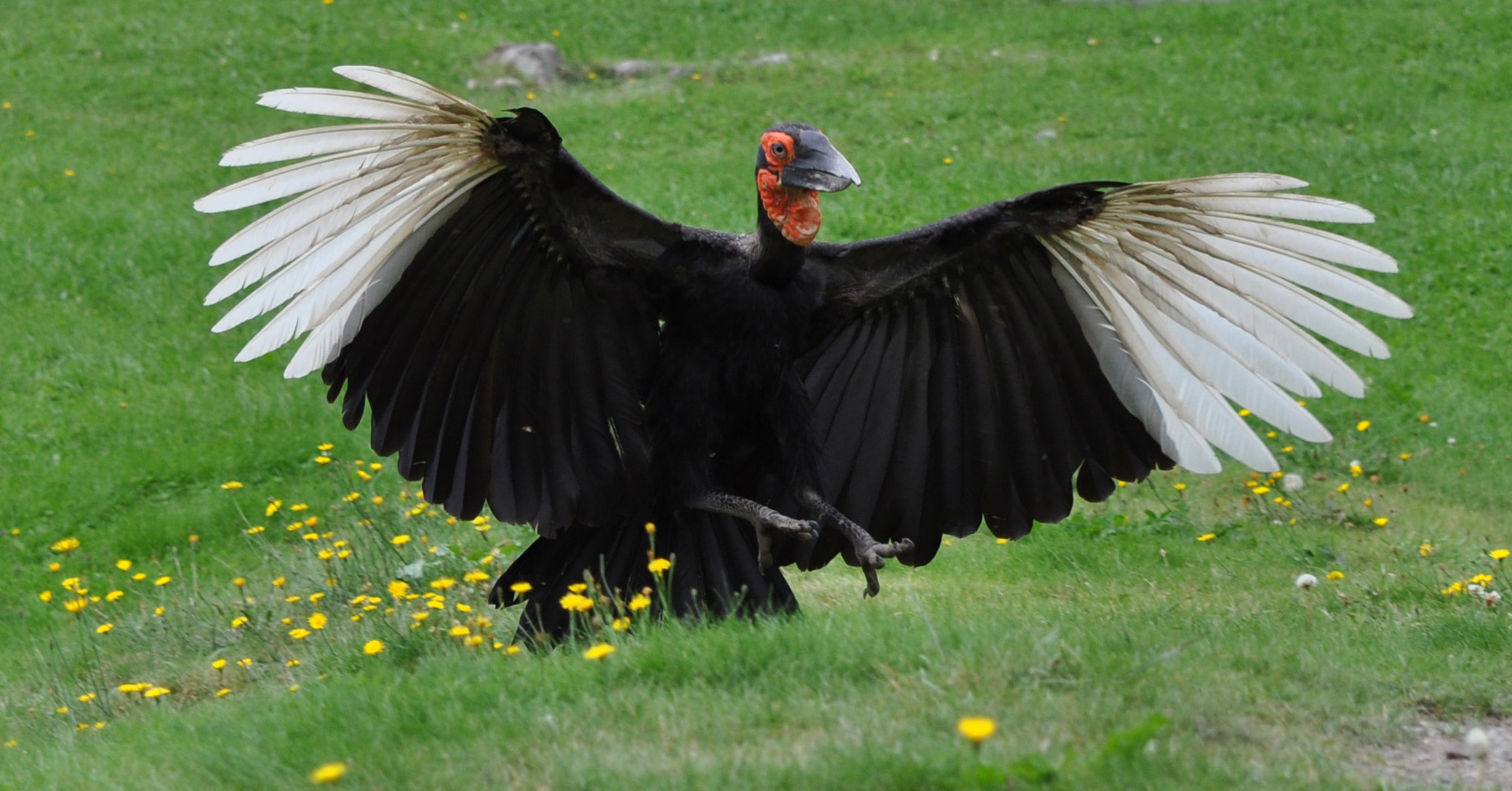
Contrasting primary and secondary feathers seen upon landing

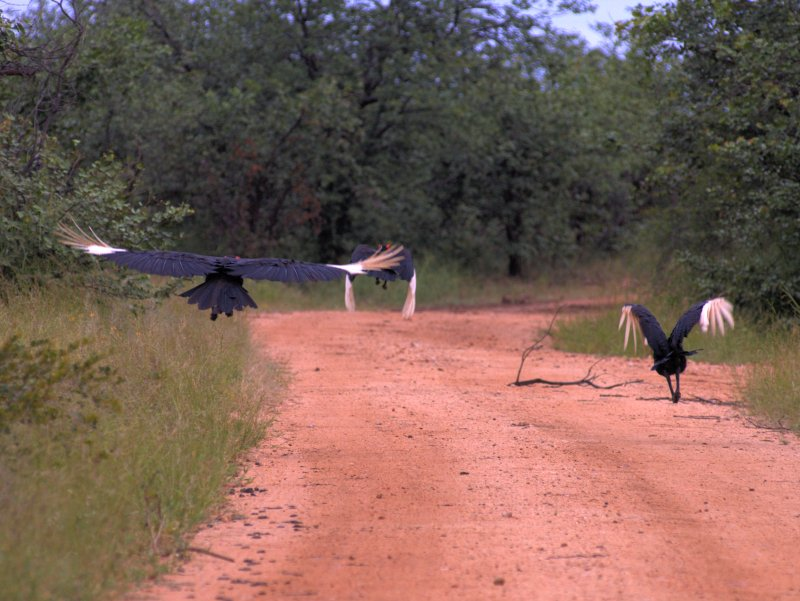
A group taking flight
