= Dave Leadbetter =

David Leadbetter (19 November 1934 – 15 March 2006), was a figure in Scottish politics.

He was born in South Battersea, London, England.

He was reportedly a regular speaker at the annual Declaration of Arbroath rally and potential member of the Scottish Republican Socialist Movement.
