= Ledbetter (surname) =

Ledbetter is a surname. Notable people with the name include:

- Austin Ledbetter (born 1995), American soccer player
- Bob Ledbetter (1933–1983), American football player and coach
- Branden Ledbetter (born 1986), American football player
- Brian Ledbetter (born 1963), American sailor
- Brownie Ledbetter (1932–2010), political activist
- Bud Ledbetter (1852–1937), American deputy marshal
- Calvin Ledbetter, Jr. (1928–2013), educator and politician
- Cindy Ledbetter, American politician and nurse
- Cody Ledbetter (1973–2015), American football player
- Colton Ledbetter (born 2001), American baseball player
- David H. Ledbetter (born 1953), American geneticist
- Doc Ledbetter (1910–1946), American football player
- Eleanor Edwards Ledbetter (1870–1954), American librarian
- Huddie Ledbetter or Lead Belly (1888–1949), American folk and blues singer
- James Ledbetter (1964–2024), American writer
- Jeff Ledbetter (born 1959), American baseball player
- Jeremiah Ledbetter (born 1994), American football player
- Joe Ledbetter (born 1977), American artist and art toy designer
- Jonathan Ledbetter (born 1997), American football player
- Lilly Ledbetter (1938–2024), American activist and plaintiff in Ledbetter v. Goodyear Tire & Rubber Co.
- Marshall Ledbetter (1969–2003), American protester
- Melinda Ledbetter (1946–2024), American talent manager and wife of Brian Wilson
- Mike Ledbetter (1985–2019), American blues singer and guitarist
- Monte Ledbetter (born 1943), American football player
- Nathaniel Ledbetter (born 1961), American politician
- Razor Ledbetter (1894–1969), American baseball player
- Toy Ledbetter (1927–1995), American football player
- Virgil Ledbetter (1918–1967), American football and baseball coach
- William Ledbetter (born 1961), American science fiction writer

== See also ==
- Leadbetter (surname)
