= May 1975 =

Month of 1975

<<	May 1975					>>
Su	Mo	Tu	We	Th	Fr	Sa
				1	2	3
4	5	6	7	8	9	10
11	12	13	14	15	16	17
18	19	20	21	22	23	24
25	26	27	28	29	30	31

The following events occurred in May 1975:

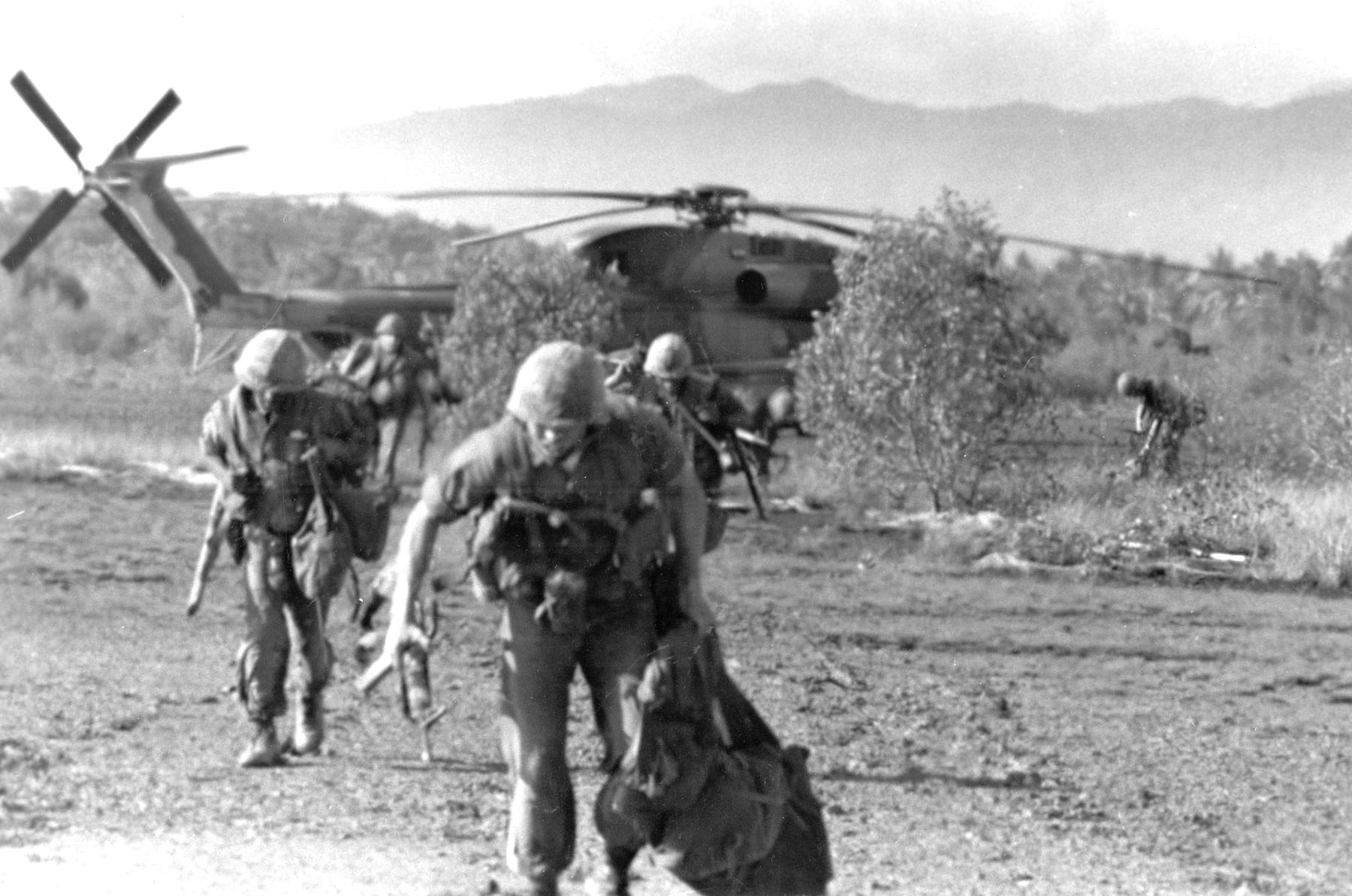
May 15, 1975: U.S. Marine and U.S. Navy force fights Khmer Rouge troops

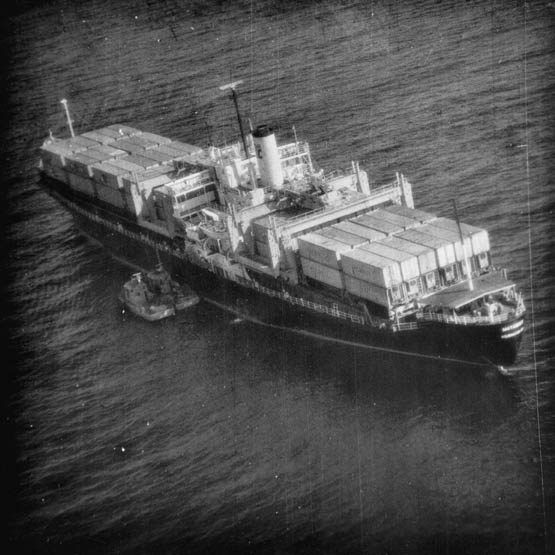
May 12, 1975: American freighter Mayaguez and crew seized by Cambodian communist troops

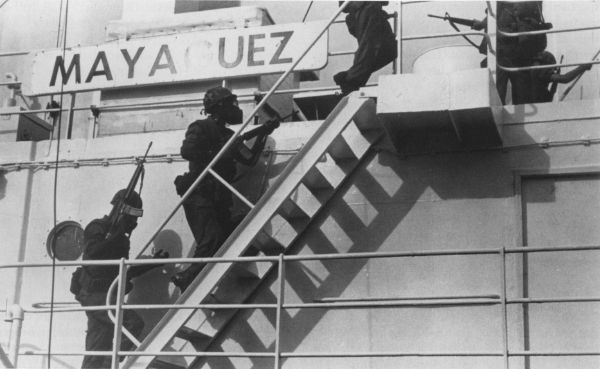
U.S. recaptures the Mayaguez

== May 1, 1975 (Thursday) ==
- Under pressure from the U.S. Securities and Exchange Commission, the New York Stock Exchange dropped the requirement of a fixed commission for stock transactions. Free to vary their rates, brokerage houses could compete for large investors by offering a lower charge than that for individuals. "Overnight...the average commission dropped by 75 percent," Alan C. Greenberg would note in 2010, adding "the 5,000 share trade of IBM stock 35 years ago included a $1,500 commission but today can be executed online for $8.95".
- Hank Aaron broke the career record for RBIs runs batted in when his Milwaukee Brewers beat the Detroit Tigers 17-3. Aaron, who had already broken Babe Ruth's career home run record, surpassed Ruth's RBI mark with the 2,210th RBI. Aaron's record of 2,297 RBIs remains unbroken.
- Born: Marc-Vivien Foé, Cameroonian footballer, in Yaoundé (died during match, 2003)
- Died: Nguyễn Khoa Nam, 48, Major General of IV Corps in Cần Thơ, South Vietnam, committed suicide at 7:00 A.M at home a day after South Vietnamese President Duong Van Minh announced unconditional surrender to North Vietnam on Fall of Saigon

== May 2, 1975 (Friday) ==
- The remaining South Vietnamese soldiers who had resisted the invasion by North Vietnamese forces, surrendered at 9:00 am in the battle of Long Xuyên, An Giang.
- Smokey the Bear, a 25-year-old black bear at the National Zoo in Washington, D.C., was retired from service as a living symbol of fire prevention. He died on November 8, 1976.
- Born:
  - David Beckham, English footballer, in Leytonstone
  - Ahmed Hassan, Egyptian footballer, in Maghagha

== May 3, 1975 (Saturday) ==
- In his last meeting of the Politburo of the Chinese Communist Party, Chairman Mao Zedong spoke out to reverse the disastrous Cultural Revolution. Mao criticized his own wife (Jiang Qing), along with her associates (Zhang Chunqiao, Yao Wenyuan, and Wang Hongwen) for their instigation of the movement, telling them "Don't function as a gang of four." The Chairman would also call for the reversal of the persecution of intellectuals, who had been referred to by cultural revolutionaries as "the stinking number nine" (choulaojiu), the ninth group of pariahs (the first eight were landlords, rich peasants, counter-revolutionaries, bad elements, rightists, renegades, enemy agents and capitalist roaders); quoting from the Communist Chinese opera Taking Tiger Mountain by Strategy, Mao proclaimed "We can't do without 'number nine'." After Mao's death the following year, the Party would remove and prosecute the Gang of Four (Sìrén bàng).
- The nuclear-powered aircraft carrier USS Nimitz, first of the Nimitz class group of the ten largest "supercarriers" in the world, was commissioned.
- All former South Vietnamese military personnel and government officials were ordered to register with the victorious Communist conquerors, starting with generals on May 8 and 9. One month later, all registrants would be ordered to report to reeducation camps.
- The city of Jerusalem was struck by missiles for the first time, after two Czechoslovak made Katyusha rockets, fired by Arab guerillas, struck 500 meters from the Knesset parliament building.
- West Ham United won the FA Cup at Wembley, beating Fulham, 2-0. Both goals were scored by Alan Taylor. The legendary Bobby Moore, who had played 16 seasons for West Ham until 1974, played for Fulham against his old team.
- Born: Christina Hendricks, American TV actress best known as Joan Holloway in Mad Men; in Knoxville, Tennessee
- Died: Dmitri Bystrolyotov, 74, former Soviet master spy

== May 4, 1975 (Sunday) ==
- The one millionth run in Major League Baseball history was scored by Bob Watson of the Houston Astros, during a game against the Giants in San Francisco. By the end of the 1973 season, sportscaster Mark Sackler calculated that 981,823 runs had been scored since the National League began play in 1876 and the American League in 1901; and before the start of the 1975 season the mark was 997,869. When the count reached 999,500 MLB set up a center in New York City to record each additional run at the moment that the batter finished rounding the bases. After Claudell Washington of Oakland registered #999,999 against the White Sox at 3:26 pm New York time, both Watson (in San Francisco) and the Reds' Dave Concepción (in Cincinnati, against Atlanta) came up to bat. Concepcion's hit actually came a few seconds before that of Watson, but in the race between the two men, Watson reached home plate at 3:32:30 (12:32 local) while Concepcion was rounding third base for #1,000,001.
- Weeks after taking control of Cambodia, the Khmer Rouge began a fight against the new Communist regime in Vietnam, seizing control of South Vietnam's Phú Quốc Island and making the first attacks in what would lead to the Cambodian–Vietnamese War.
- Died: Moe Howard, 77, leader and last survivor of The Three Stooges. Born Moses Horwitz, he outlived his brothers Curly Howard (Jerome Horwitz) and Shemp Howard (Samuel Horwitz). The other part of the famous team of Moe, Larry and Curly— Larry Fine (Louis Feinberg) — had died three months earlier.

== May 5, 1975 (Monday) ==
- Television broadcasting began in South Africa, as the first test broadcasts of the South African Broadcasting Corporation TV system were made; regular broadcasting would start on January 5, 1976.
- The Busch Gardens Williamsburg Theme Park opened in Virginia.
- For the first time since the founding of Social Security in the U.S., the Social Security Administration announced the retirement and disability program was in debt; and that its $46 billion reserve would be drained by 1983.

== May 6, 1975 (Tuesday) ==
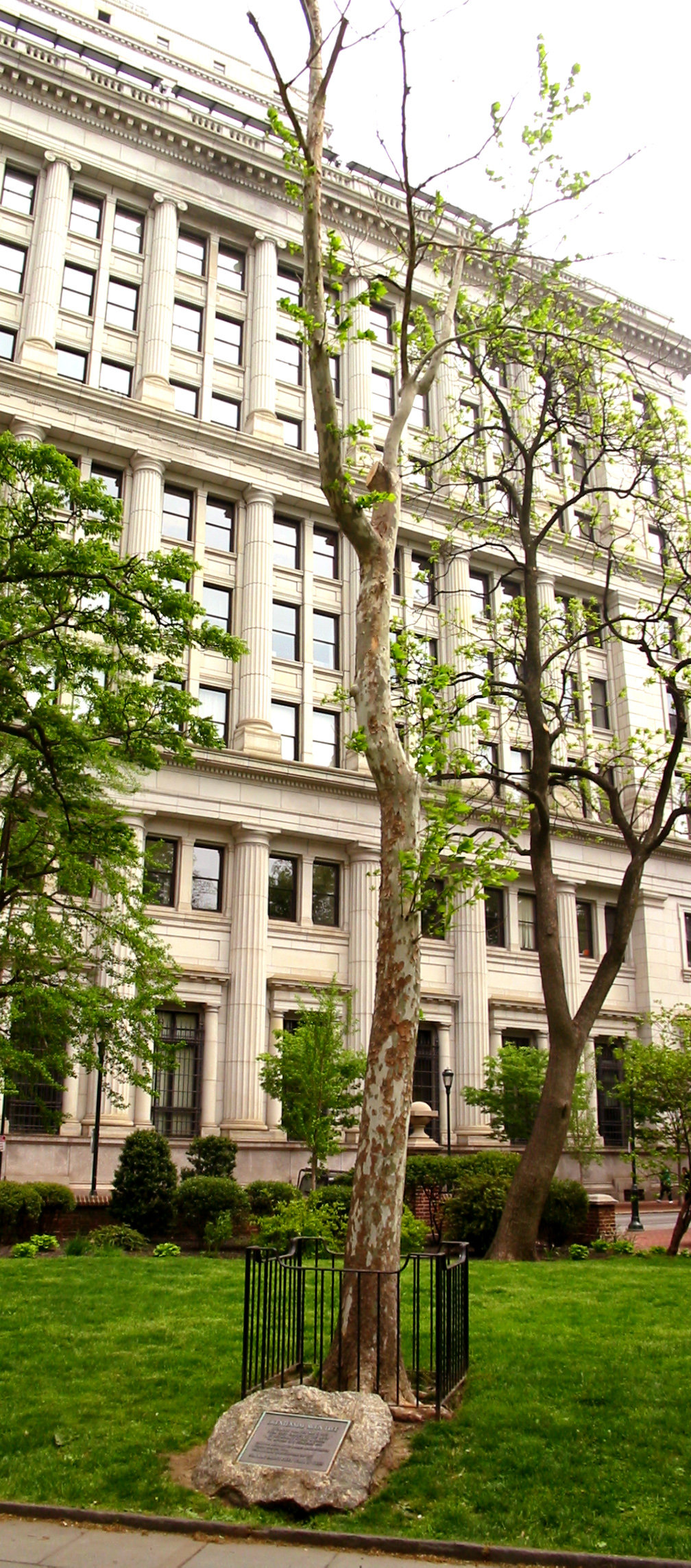
Moon tree in Philadelphia

- A tornado destroyed much of the city of Omaha, Nebraska, touching down at 4:29 in the afternoon local time, and then moving north-eastwardly for almost half an hour. The amount of damage— more than $300,000,000 (equivalent to $1,450,000,000 in 2019)— set a new record for the costliest tornado in American history, but only three people were killed
- The first "Moon Tree" to be planted, so called because it was grown from a seed that had been part of small canister containing about 500 seeds that had been taken to the Moon on the Apollo 14 mission, was placed at Washington Square Park in Philadelphia.
- During a lull in fighting, 100,000 Armenians gather in Beirut to commemorate the 60th anniversary of the Armenian genocide.
- Died: József Mindszenty, 77, Hungarian Roman Catholic cardinal who was imprisoned and tortured for defying the Communist regime in Hungary. From 1956 to 1971, he was given sanctuary inside the U.S. Embassy in Budapest.

== May 7, 1975 (Wednesday) ==
- U.S. President Ford proclaimed the end of the Vietnam Era for purposes of certain veterans' benefits. Under Title 38 of the United States Code, §101 (29)(A), the era is now defined as "The period beginning on February 28, 1961, and ending on May 7, 1975, in the case of a veteran who served in the Republic of Vietnam during that period."
- Died: George Baker, 59, American U.S. Army sergeant and cartoonist who created the World War II comic strip character "Sad Sack" (later adapted as a comic book series for Harvey Comics.

== May 8, 1975 (Thursday) ==
- The People's Republic of China agreed to establish trade and diplomatic relations with the European Community, agreeing to send a representative to Common Market headquarters in Brussels.
- The last known foreigners remaining in Cambodia, about 550 occupants of the French Embassy in Phnom Penh, crossed the border into Thailand three weeks after Cambodia's fall to Communist guerillas. Transported by a convoy of cars and trucks, and escorted by soldiers of the Khmer Rouge, the group that walked over into Aranyaprathet consisted of 230 French citizens and about 300 Khmer Muslims, but no Cambodian holders of French passports.
- Born: Enrique Iglesias, Spanish singer born in Madrid
- Died:
  - Avery Brundage, 87, American philanthropist who led the International Olympic Committee from 1952 to 1972
  - Philip Dorn, 73, American actor

== May 9, 1975 (Friday) ==
- In Laos, Kaho Xane Pathet Lao, the official newspaper of the Lao People's Party, ran the announcement that the nation's Hmong people "must be exterminated down to the root of the tribe" because their soldiers had assisted the United States in fighting the Communists. The extermination would begin days later.
- The Constitution of Cameroon was amended to create a new office, Prime Minister of Cameroon, which would also be first in line to succeed the President. The first officeholder would be Paul Biya, who would become President in 1982, a post he still holds.

== May 10, 1975 (Saturday) ==
- The Betamax home videotaping system was introduced by Sony with the LV-1901 going on sale in Japan. The unit, which contained a color TV, the recorder, and the tapes, retailed for $2,488 (equivalent to more than $9,000 USD in 2010).
- Brian Oldfield of the United States set a mark for the shot put of 75 feet, more than 3 feet further than had ever been achieved. The record was not recognized, because Oldfield was paid as an athlete for the International Track Association (ITA).
- Darrell Waltrip won his first national NASCAR race in his fourth season of competition, in the Music City 420 in Nashville. Waltrip would go on to win three NASCAR championships (1981, 1982 and 1985).
- U.S. Treasury Secretary William E. Simon announced the federal government would not provide aid to provide $1.5 billion to meet two months of expenditures for New York City. The requests had been made by city Mayor Abraham Beame.
- Born: Hélio Castroneves, Brazilian race car driver; winner of Indianapolis 500 (in his first appearance, 2001, and in 2002, 2009 and 2021); in São Paulo

== May 11, 1975 (Sunday) ==
- A crowd of about 75,000 people in New York City's Central Park celebrated the end of the Vietnam War Organized by Phil Ochs, the rally included music performances by Bob Dylan, Pete Seeger, Joan Baez, and Paul Simon.
- A partial solar eclipse was visible in Greenland, Europe, north Africa and north Asia, and was the 66th solar eclipse of Solar Saros 118.
- Born: Ziad Jarrah, Lebanese al-Qaeda terrorist who took control of United Airlines Flight 93 in the 9/11 attacks, and crashed the plane near Shanksville, Pennsylvania, murdering 42 passengers and crew, and killing himself. (d. 2001)

== May 12, 1975 (Monday) ==
- At 2:10 pm local time (3:10 am in Washington DC), the United States merchant ship SS Mayaguez was stopped in international waters by the P-128, a Cambodian gunboat manned by Khmer Rouge forces. Ten minutes later, P-128 fired machine guns across the bow as a warning, and at 2:35, a group of seven Khmer soldiers boarded the Mayaguez, commandeering the ship and taking its 39 crew captive.
- With two goals from 47-year-old ice hockey legend Gordie Howe, the Houston Aeros won their second straight World Hockey Association championship, defeating the Quebec Nordiques, 7-2, to sweep the best of four series.
- Two Soviet destroyer ships, the Boykiy and the Zhguchiy, sailed into Boston Harbor, becoming the first Soviet ships to dock at a U.S. port since the beginning of the Cold War. The occasion was the 30th anniversary of the Allied victory over Germany. The next day, the U.S. Navy ships USS Leahy and the USS Tattnall sailed into Leningrad.
- Helmut Kohl was selected ahead of Franz Joseph Strauss as the Christian Socialist Union candidate for Chancellor in the 1976 West German elections.
- Born:
  - Jonah Lomu, New Zealand rugby union player, in Auckland (d. 2015)
  - David Kostelecký, Czech Olympic sports shooter, in Brno

== May 13, 1975 (Tuesday) ==
- South Korea's President Park Chung-hee issued "Emergency Decree No. 9 for the Preservation of National Security and Public Order", prohibiting anyone from trying to "deny, oppose, distort, slander, revise or abrogate" the Yushin constitution that had been adopted in 1972.
- Turkey's Prime Minister Süleyman Demirel was punched in the face by a 34-year-old unemployed man, Vural Onsel, at Ankara. Demirel's nose was broken as he walked out of a cabinet meeting.
- Born:
  - Ray Lewis, American NFL linebacker, in Bartow, Florida
  - Peter Iwers, Swedish rock bassist for heavy metal group In Flames and The Halo Effect; in Gothenburg
- Died:
  - Marguerite Perey, 65, French chemist who discovered the element francium
  - Bob Wills, 70, American country western singer
  - Richard Hollingshead, 75, inventor (in 1933) of the drive-in theater

== May 14, 1975 (Wednesday) ==
- After the British government declined to award a patent to César Milstein, Georges J. F. Köhler and Niels Kaj Jerne for inventing a process to create specially made antibodies, Milstein and Köhler submitted a letter to the British science journal Nature, which published the news in its August 7 issue. The three biochemists would win the Nobel Prize in 1984.
- Nineteen years after the Academy Award for best screenplay was awarded to, but went unclaimed by, an author with the pseudonym of "Robert Rich", Dalton Trumbo was presented the 1956 Oscar for scripting The Brave Ones. Trumbo had been blacklisted from Hollywood during the 1950s for his former membership in the Communist Party.
- Thousands of Hmong soldiers and officers, who had assisted the CIA during the Laotian Civil War, reported to the Long Chieng airbase in Laos, along with their families. Though the Hmong were told that they would be airlifted to safety before the country was taken over by the Communist Pathet Lao, only two cargo planes were allotted to the rescue, which saved only 2,500 people. The others were forced to flee into the surrounding jungles, where they were hunted down after Communist troops captured Long Chieng. Those who survived to make it to Thailand lived in refugee camps for years.
- The first full-sized luxury electric car, the Transformer 1, was introduced by Apollo Energy Systems at a press conference in the Detroit suburb of Southfield, Michigan. Robert Aronson showed the car to reporters and Aronson's friend, television personality Arthur Godfrey, drove the vehicle around the grounds of the Raleigh House. The Transformer 1 was a modified two-door 1975 Chevy Chevelle powered by a 180-volt lead cobalt battery
- Died: Ernst Alexanderson, 97, Swedish-born American inventor and pioneer in the development of radio and television.

== May 15, 1975 (Thursday) ==
- The American merchant ship Mayaguez, seized three days earlier by Cambodian forces, was rescued after the U.S. Marines landed on Kohn Tang Island, where the 45 crewmen had been held captive. Another contingent of Marines had boarded the Mayaguez and found it deserted, while the 130-man force sent to the island fought in combat against the Khmer Rouge. Under the white flag of surrender, a Cambodian vessel brought 30 Americans to the destroyer USS Wilson. 15 U.S. servicemen were killed in America's last battle in Indochina. The American assault force that landed on Koh Tang expected only 20 Khmer Rouge defenders, and encountered 150. A Khmer rocket brought down "Knife 31", a U.S. Sikorsky HH-53 helicopter, and 18 of the 231 Americans were unaccounted for when the attack force withdrew. It would later be revealed that three of the Marines (Joseph N. Hargrove, Gary L. Hall, and Danny G. Marshall) may have been left behind on the island.
- Star Trek: The Animated Series, the Star Trek franchise's second series, won the franchise's first Emmy Award.

== May 16, 1975 (Friday) ==
- Sikkim, formerly an absolute monarchy, became the 22nd state of India and its 200,000 residents became citizens, as Indian President Fakhruddin Ali Ahmed signed an order ratifying an amendment to the nation's constitution. Sikkimese voters had overwhelmingly approved annexation on April 14 and India's Parliament had approved statehood the same month.
- Scotland's 33 shires were reorganized into nine regions (Borders, Central, Dumfries and Galloway, Fife, Grampian, Highland, Lothian, Strathclyde and Tayside), and three islands (Orkney, Shetland, Western Isles, as the Local Government (Scotland) Act 1973 (given royal assent October 25, 1973) became effective. Each of the regions, were, in turn, divided into districts. The system would remain for almost 21 years until the effective date of the Local Government etc. (Scotland) Act 1994, which replaced the regions with 32 local government areas.
- Junko Tabei, a 35-year-old homemaker from Japan, became the first woman to reach the top of Mount Everest, arriving at the summit 29,028 feet above sea level at 12:30 pm local time. Mrs. Tabei was accompanied by a Sherpa guide, Ang Tsering. At the time, she was only the 36th person to scale the mountain, the first two having been Sir Edmund Hillary and Tenzing Norgay in 1953. Mrs. Tabei would go on to become the first woman to scale the highest peak on all seven continents.
- Born: Simon Whitfield, Canadian triathlete, and 2008 Olympic gold medalist; in Kingston, Ontario
- Died:
  - Michael X (Michael de Freitas), 41, Trinidadian revolutionary and convicted murderer, was executed by hanging
  - Mel London, 43, American jazz producer and songwriter

== May 17, 1975 (Saturday) ==
- Filbert Bayi of Tanzania broke the world record for running the fastest mile, held by Jim Ryun for almost eight years (June 23, 1967). Bayi, who led the race in Kingston, Jamaica, from start to finish, bested Ryun by a tenth of a second, covering the distance in 3:51.0; less than three months later, on August 12, John Walker of New Zealand would break Bayi's mark.
- The "Wild Man of the Green Swamp (Florida)" was captured by sheriff's deputies in Sumter County, Florida after surviving on his own for eight months. First sighted in September, he had eaten armadillos, snakes, turtles and alligators. Identified as Hu Tu-Mei of Taiwan, a mentally ill man who had escaped from a Tampa hospital, the "Wild Man" hanged himself in jail two days later.

== May 18, 1975 (Sunday) ==
- Chinese writer Ding Ling was unexpectedly released from five years of solitary confinement in prison, as the Communist government continued to reverse the Cultural Revolution. Two days later, she was paroled from the Qincheng Prison and moved to the town of Changzhi.
- Born: Jack Johnson, American singer-songwriter, known for "Flake" 2002 and "Bubble Toes" 2003, in North Shore, Oahu, Hawaii, U.S.
- Died:
  - Roy Hart, 49, South African and French stage producer, was killed in an auto accident, along with his wife and another actress.
  - Leroy Anderson, 66, American composer
  - Christopher Strachey, 58, British computer scientist
  - Aníbal Troilo, 60, Argentine tango musician
  - Hanora O'Leary, 79, survivor of the sinking of RMS Titanic in 1912

== May 19, 1975 (Monday) ==
- Trial began against International Business Machines (IBM) for violations of anti-trust law, and lasted for more than six years. On January 8, 1982, the U.S. Justice Department would voluntarily drop further proceedings.
- Marxist rebels from Zaire crossed Lake Tanganyika into Tanzania, and invaded the Gombe Stream primate research facility that had been home to primatologist Jane Goodall. Three Stanford University students, and one Dutch national, Goodall, nursing a sore eye, had turned off her nightlight minutes before the troops arrived, which she would say later kept her from being taken hostage. The four hostages would be released two months later, but the Gombe park has required armed protection ever since.
- In India's Maharashtra state, a truck, filled with people on their way to a wedding, was struck by a passenger train while crossing the tracks, killing 66 people and injuring another 18.

== May 20, 1975 (Tuesday) ==
- The new Khmer Rouge regime in Cambodia began the Cambodian genocide, a coordinated effort to purge private citizens associated by the new government as impediments to the revolution. Between 1975 and the 1978 invasion of Cambodia by Vietnam, an estimated 1.3 million people would be executed out of a population of 7.8 million. Although executions of public officials of the old regime had taken place after Phnom Penh fell, May 20 is now commemorated in Cambodia as the date that the Khmer Rouge campaign against private citizens began and is a public holiday, the "National Day of Remembrance"
- The U.S. House of Representatives voted 303-96 to admit women to the previously all-male service academies at West Point, Annapolis, and Colorado Springs. The Senate would follow suit, and the bill signed into law in June.
- In Game 3 of the NHL championship, a hot, humid evening in Buffalo, New York, the temperature inside Memorial Auditorium reached 90 °F, causing a foggy mist to hover over the ice hockey rink. By the third period, the mist was thick enough that the puck was difficult to see. Play was halted 15 times so that the fog could be dispersed (by having players from both teams skate around the rink). The hometown Sabres tied the game 4-4 against the Philadelphia Flyers, then won 5-4 in sudden death overtime as a shot by Rene Robert got past Flyers' goalie Bernie Parent.
- The 174th and final episode of the NBC police drama Adam-12 was broadcast, ending a seven-season run for actors Martin Milner (as officer Pete Malloy) and Kent McCord (as officer Jim Reed).
- Died:
  - Fiame Mata'afa Faumuina Mulinu'u II, 53, Prime Minister of Western Samoa (now Samoa) since its independence in 1962
  - George Tunnell, 62, one of the first black vocalists to perform with a white band (Jan Savitt and the Top Hatters)

== May 21, 1975 (Wednesday) ==
- The musical A Chorus Line was performed for the first time, opening at the Newman Theater in New York City. When the production moved to the Shubert Theater on Broadway, it would run for 6,104 performances.
- Seventy-six of the 100 United States Senators signed a letter to U.S. President Ford, asking him "to endorse Israel's demand for defensible frontiers and massive economic and military assistance" when preparing the budget to be submitted to Congress.
- The trial of Andreas Baader, Ulrike Meinhof, Gudrun Ensslin and Jan-Carl Raspe began under tight security inside the Stammheim Prison near Stuttgart. The trial would last for almost two years, during which Ensslin confessed to most of the charges, and Meinhof was found hanged in her prison cell.
- Died: Barbara Hepworth, 72, British sculptor, in a fire at her studio

== May 22, 1975 (Thursday) ==
- Playing in Louisville, the Kentucky Colonels won the championship of the American Basketball Association, beating the Indiana Pacers, 110-105, to win the series 4 games to 1.
- A train derailment at Sidi Yahya El Gharb, in Morocco, killed 50 people and injured another 200.
- New York Jets quarterback Joe Namath turned down what would have been the most lucrative contract in pro football up to that time, $4,000,000 to play with the Chicago Winds of the World Football League for the 1975 and 1976 seasons, and the 1977 for a future WFL franchise in New York City.
- Died:
  - Lefty Grove, 75, former MLB pitcher and member of Baseball Hall of Fame
  - Torben Meyer, 90, Danish-born Hollywood character actor

== May 23, 1975 (Friday) ==
- The Indochina Migration and Refugee Assistance Act of 1975 was signed into law by U.S. President Ford, providing for resettlement of South Vietnamese and Cambodian refugees into the United States. The Act would be amended on June 21, 1976 to include refugees from Laos.
- A military government was appointed to lead Lebanon, with Brigadier General Nureddine Rifai as the interim Prime Minister, and a cabinet with only one civilian member. The administration of Lebanon's "first military premier" ended when he resigned after only three days.
- Dave Beck, former President of the Teamsters International, was given an unconditional pardon by U.S. President Ford. The man who succeeded Beck, Jimmy Hoffa, would disappear two months later.
- Died: Moms Mabley (Loretta Aiken), 81, African-American comedian

== May 24, 1975 (Saturday) ==
- The last naturally occurring case of the smallpox virus variola major was found on a woman named Saiban Bibi, who was found ill at a railway station in Karimganj in the Assam state of India. The last case of variola minor would be found in Somalia, at Merca, in October 1977.
- The Soviet space mission Soyuz 18 was launched into space with Pyotr Klimuk and Vitaly Sevastyanov on board. The next day, the cosmonauts docked with the Salyut 4 space station.

== May 25, 1975 (Sunday) ==
- A central total lunar eclipse was visible in eastern Australia, Pacific, both Americas, Africa and western Europe, and was the 32nd lunar eclipse of Lunar Saros 130.
- Bobby Unser won the 1975 Indianapolis 500, which was halted after 435 miles (700 km), with 25 laps left. Unser, in his second win, was in the lead when a rainstorm caused officials to stop the race.
- The Golden State Warriors won the NBA championship in a four-game sweep over the Washington Bullets, 96-95, at Landover, Maryland.
- Died: Count Dante (John Keehan), 36, American martial artist who billed himself as "The Deadliest Man Alive", died in his sleep of internal hemorrhaging caused by a bleeding ulcer.

== May 26, 1975 (Monday) ==
- The Soyuz 18 rocket linked up with the Salyut 4 space station.
- Born: Lauryn Hill, American singer and rapper, in Newark, New Jersey

== May 27, 1975 (Tuesday) ==
- The Dibbles Bridge coach crash near Grassington, North Yorkshire, England killed 32 people, all but the driver being middle-aged and elderly women, in the worst road accident in the history of the United Kingdom. The women, all bus passengers from Thornaby-on-Tees, were on a sightseeing tour of the Yorkshire Dales. The poorly maintained brakes of the bus failed as it was descending a steep hill, sending the vehicle out of control and off of a 17 foot high bridge.
- The Alaska Supreme Court ruled, 5-0, that the right to possession and use of marijuana within one's home could not be outlawed, citing constitutional guarantees of privacy, making Alaska the first of the United States to partially decriminalize cannabis. The decision came in the case of Ravin v. State, 537 P.2d. 494 (Alaska, 1975), a test case brought by lawyer Irvin Ravin of Homer, Alaska, who had arranged to be stopped while driving to his home with a small amount of pot in his possession.
- The Philadelphia Flyers defeated the Buffalo Sabres, 2-0, to win the NHL's Stanley Cup, 4 games to 2. The series marked the first Cup finals, since 1923, that neither of the two finalists had been one of the "Original Six" (Boston, Chicago, Detroit, Montreal, N.Y. Rangers, or Toronto).
- Laos and the United States reached an 8-point agreement in Vientiane, with all Americans to leave Laos, the last nation in Southeast Asia not controlled by Communists, by June 30.
- Quechua, spoken by three million of the Quechua people in Peru, was made the second official language in that South American nation, joining Spanish as a language to be used in education and court proceedings.
- Born:
  - André 3000, American rapper, born Andre Benjamin in Atlanta, Georgia
  - Jamie Oliver, English chef, restaurateur, media personality, in Clavering, Essex

== May 28, 1975 (Wednesday) ==
- Less than a month after the fall of South Vietnam created doubts about American commitment to its allies, U.S. President Ford reassured the other members of the North Atlantic Treaty Organization that "NATO is the cornerstone of U.S. foreign policy and has the unwavering support of the American public and of our Congress. Our commitment to this alliance will not falter." Ford declared in Brussels the next day that none of the 310,000 American troops in Europe would be withdrawn and re-emphasized that the U.S. "unconditionally and unequivocally remains true" to its pledge to defend Western Europe against an outside attack.
- Fifteen West African countries signed the Treaty of Lagos, creating the Economic Community of West African States.

== May 29, 1975 (Thursday) ==
- Ludvík Svoboda retired as General Secretary of Czechoslovakia's Communist Party, due to illness, and was replaced by Gustáv Husák. Svoboda, 80, remained as President of Czechoslovakia until June 5, because he was too ill to sign a resignation.

== May 30, 1975 (Friday) ==
- For the first time in eight years, the Suez Canal became navigable once more, after the last two ships, trapped since the Six-Day War of 1967, were raised and removed. The British freighters Scottish Star and Port Invercargill, were towed 60 miles from the Great Bitter Lake to Port Said. The Suez Canal would officially reopen on June 5.
- The five-team International Volleyball Association (IVA) played its very first game before a crowd of 2,451 as the San Diego Breakers defeated the visiting El Paso - Juarez Sol in a five-game match, 11-13, 12-10, 12-6, 8-12 and 12-1.
- Born: CeeLo Green (stage name for Thomas D. Callaway), American singer-songwriter, pianist, producer, and actor; in Atlanta
- Died:
  - Steve Prefontaine, 24, American long distance runner described as "holder of every American distance record above 2000 meters", was killed in an auto accident at the intersection of Skyline Boulevard and Birch Lane in Eugene, Oregon, after crashing into a rock wall and being pinned beneath his vehicle. Prefontaine, who held the U.S. records for the 5000m and 10000m races, as well as for two, three and six miles, died hours after having run the second fastest 5000m race in NCAA history. An autopsy showed that he had a blood alcohol level of .16
  - Michel Simon, 80, French actor
  - Tatsuo Shimabuku, 66, founder of Isshin-ryū form of karate

== May 31, 1975 (Saturday) ==
- Communist Pathet Lao troops took control of Savannakhet, the second largest city in Laos, as Laotian Prime Minister Souvanna Phouma ordered the Royal Army to lay down their arms and cease further resistance. By year's end, Laos would become the third nation in Indochina (after Cambodia and South Vietnam) to fall under Communist control during that year.
