= July 1975 =

Month of 1975

<<	July 1975					>>
Su	Mo	Tu	We	Th	Fr	Sa
		1	2	3	4	5
6	7	8	9	10	11	12
13	14	15	16	17	18	19
20	21	22	23	24	25	26
27	28	29	30	31

The following events occurred in June 1975:

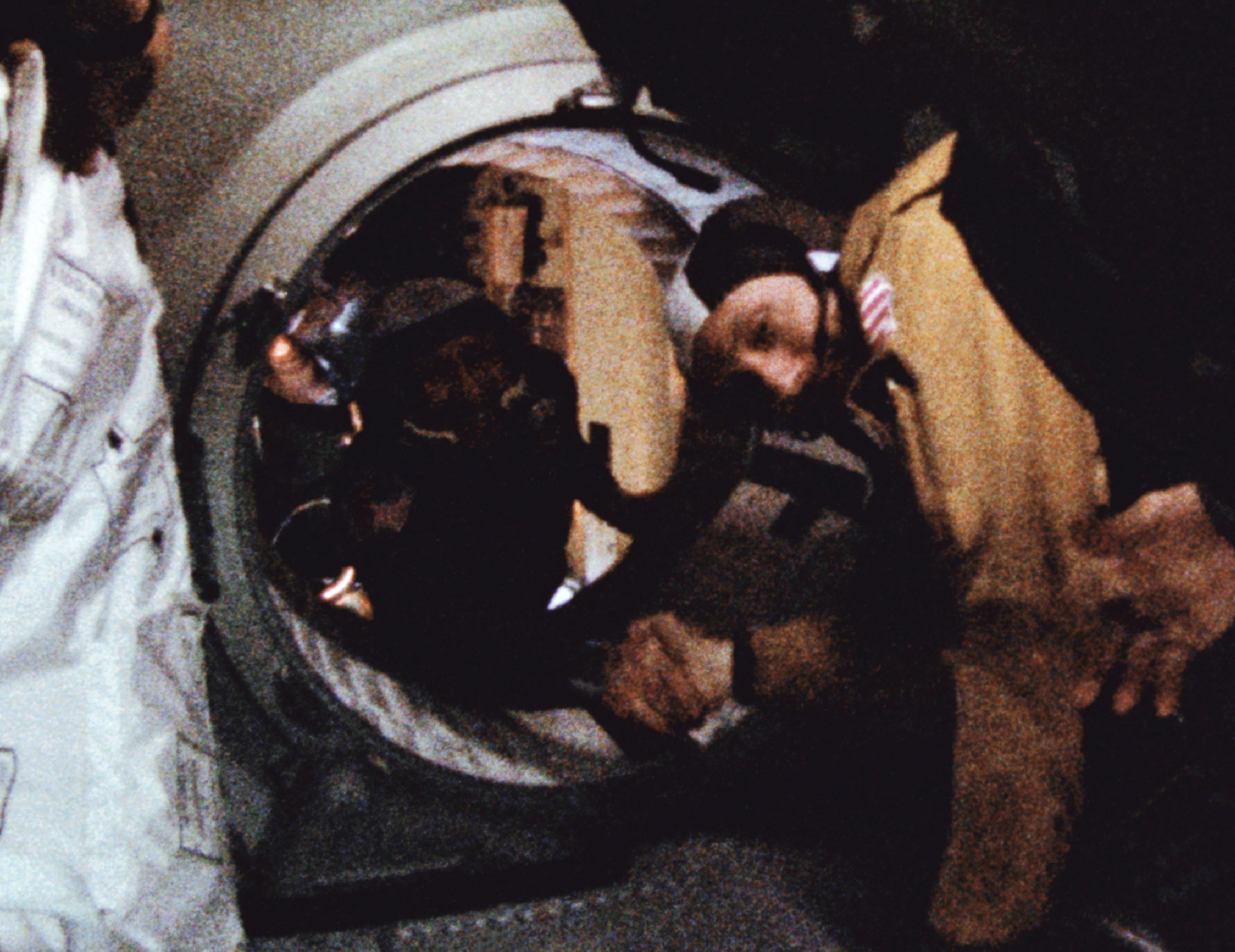
July 17, 1975: Soviet cosmonaut Leonov (left) and U.S. astronaut Stafford (right) shake hands after linkup of spaceships

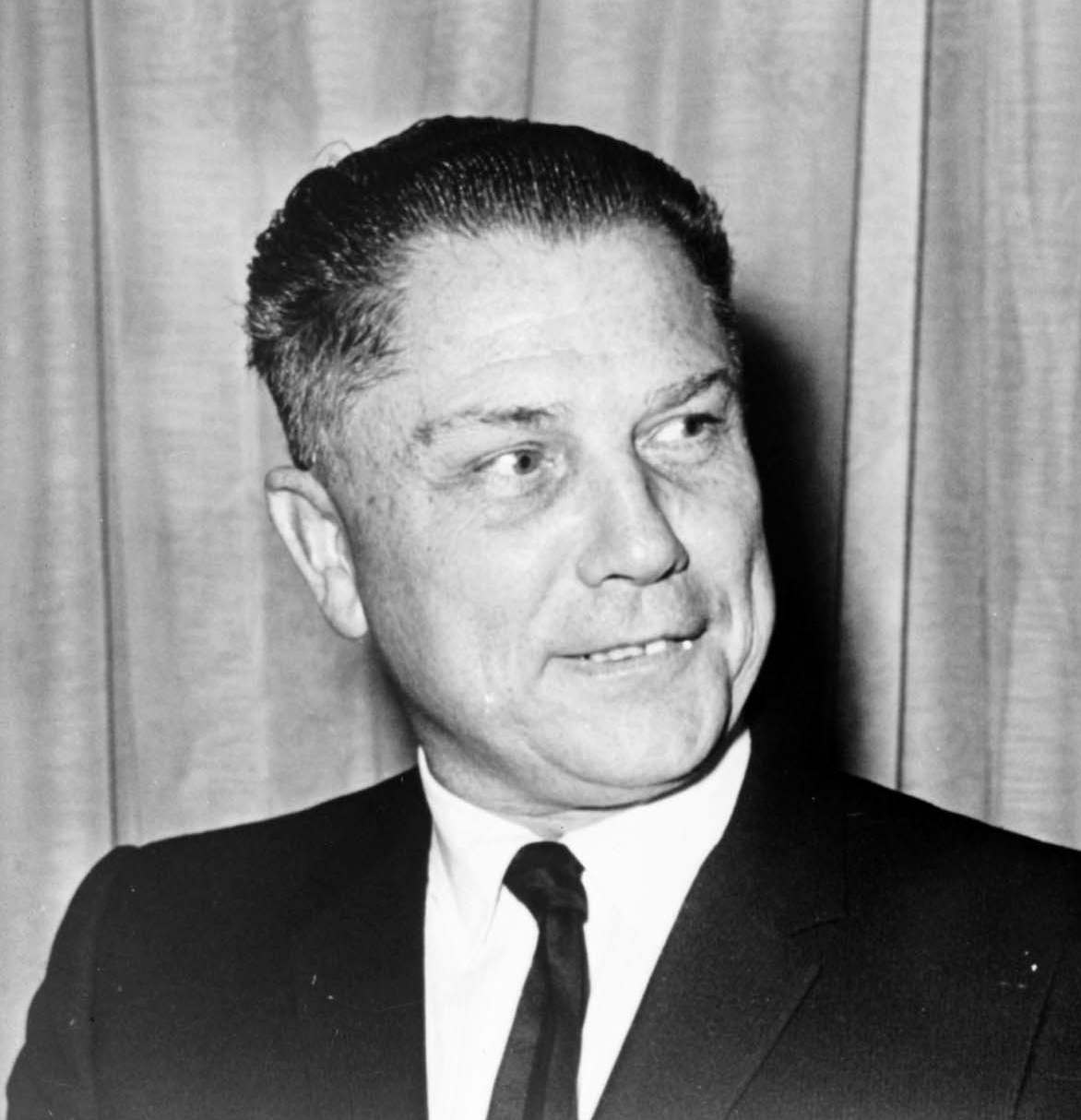
July 30, 1975: Former Teamsters President Jimmy Hoffa vanishes

July 5, 1975: Cape Verde independent (flag at the time)

July 6, 1975: Comoros independent (flag at the time)

July 12, 1975: São Tomé e Principe independent

== July 1, 1975 (Tuesday) ==
- CITES, the Convention on International Trade in Endangered Species of Wild Fauna and Flora, went into effect after being ratified by the 10th nation that had signed on March 3, 1973, representing the first international agreement to protect wildlife and plants from extinction as a result of poaching and trade.
- ARPANET, predecessor to the Internet, was declared fully operational and under the control of the Defense Communications Agency, part of the U.S. Department of Defense.
- Former U.S. President Richard Nixon said, in an affidavit to federal court, that he had secretly begun taping Oval Office conversations at the suggestion of his predecessor, President Lyndon Johnson, who had said that the tapes "had proved to be exceedingly valuable in preparing his memoirs, and he urged that I re-install the recording devices". The affidavit was filed as part of Nixon's suit seeking custody of his records, including the tape recordings, some of which had proved he had ordered a coverup of the Watergate investigation.
- As the 1976 fiscal year began, New York City announced the firing of 37,000 city employees in order to save $1.2 billion from the city budget. Laid off were 5,000 police, 2,100 firefighters, 3,000 garbage collectors, 10,000 health workers and 17,000 people in education.
- The Australian Postmaster-General's Department was split forming The Australian Telecommunications Commission (Telstra) and The Australian Postal Commission (Australia Post)
- American advice columnist Ann Landers (Esther Friedman Lederer), known for years for her suggestions to save unhappy marriages, announced in her column that she and her husband of 36 years, Jules, were going to divorce.
- Born: Sufjan Stevens, American singer, songwriter, and multi-instrumentalist; in Detroit, Michigan

== July 2, 1975 (Wednesday) ==
- Deputy Australian Prime Minister Jim Cairns was fired by Prime Minister Gough Whitlam after being accused of improper activity in obtaining foreign loans for Australia. Australia's Parliament voted 55-33 on July 14 to accept the firing.
- A young child fishing with his father discovered the body of Donald Watt Cressey, the senior cook at Old Faithful Lodge, who had died on the night of June 29-30 in a hot spring at Yellowstone National Park. Only partial remains could be recovered. Cressey had died in the same hot spring in which Brian Parsons, also a Yellowstone park concessioner employee, had been fatally burned in July 1967. After Cressey's death the hot spring was named "Dead Savage Spring" by the U.S. Geological Survey, "savage" being Yellowstone jargon for a park concessioner employee.
- Died: James Robertson Justice, 68, British character actor

== July 3, 1975 (Thursday) ==
- Barriers against the hiring of gay and lesbian people, as employees of the United States government, were ended, by order of the U.S. Civil Service Commission. Previously, employment could be denied to a homosexual person on grounds of "possible embarrassment to the federal service". The Commission ruled that, as with any other government employee, "there must be some rational connection between the individual's conduct and the efficiency of the service".

== July 4, 1975 (Friday) ==
- A bomb inside an abandoned refrigerator killed 13 people and injured 72 in Jerusalem's Zion Square in the worst terrorist attack on Israelis since the founding of the Jewish state in 1948. Most of the casualties were Jewish shoppers who were making their purchases on the eve of the Sabbath. Explosives had been placed inside of the refrigerator that had been set by terrorists in front of a toy store. PLO claimed responsibility.
- Billie Jean King defeated Evonne Goolagong to win the Wimbledon women's singles championship. The 6-0, 6-1 win was the most one-sided women's final since 1951. King announced afterward that she was retiring from singles' tournaments to concentrate on her professional league, World Team Tennis.
- Sydney newspaper publisher and heiress, Juanita Nielsen, disappeared after leaving her office at 11:00 am for a luncheon appointment that she never kept. Her handbag was found on July 14 nearby in Penrith. Nielsen published NOW, and had been a crusader against the demolition of a historic part of the city. She was never seen again.
- Born: John Lloyd Young, American actor, winner of Tony Award for Best Actor in a Musical, 2006, for Jersey Boys; in Sacramento, California

== July 5, 1975 (Saturday) ==
- Cape Verde gained independence after 500 years of Portuguese rule of the 15 inhabited islands off of the coast of West Africa. At Praia, Portugal's Prime Minister Vasco Gonçalves turned over power to National Assembly President Abilio Duarte. Later in the day, the assembly elected Aristides Pereira as President and Pedro Pires as Prime Minister.
- Arthur Ashe became the first black man to win the Wimbledon singles title, defeating the #1 ranked Jimmy Connors, 6-1, 6-1, 5-7 and 6-4.
- Hawaii's Mauna Loa volcano erupted after 25 years of inactivity, toward the city of Hilo.
- Dmitri Shostakovich completed his final composition, Opus 147 Sonata for viola and piano. He would die five weeks later on August 9.
- The Shia Amal militia, founded by Imam Musa al-Sadr, was being instructed on the use of landmines and explosives by the al Fatah branch of the PLO in Lebanon, when the lesson went horribly wrong. A huge explosion killed 42 of the fighters, and wounded more than 80.
- Born:
  - Hernán Crespo, Argentinian footballer; in Florida, Buenos Aires
  - Ai Sugiyama, Japanese tennis player, one time WTA #1 ranked doubles' player; in Yokohama
- Died:
  - Otto Skorzeny, 67, Nazi Germany colonel who carried out the Gran Sasso raid, the rescue of Benito Mussolini from prison
  - Pavlo Virsky, 70, Soviet Ukrainian choreographer

== July 6, 1975 (Sunday) ==
- The Chamber of Deputies of the French colony of the Comoros Islands voted 33-0 to declare independence from France. One island, Mayotte, would remain a French overseas department.
- Ruffian, an American champion filly thoroughbred racehorse who had won the 1975 Triple Tiara (the Acorn Stakes, the Mother Goose Stakes and the American Oaks, raced against a champion colt, 1975 Kentucky Derby winner Foolish Pleasure, who had come in second place in the Preakness, as part of a nationally televised "Challenge of the Sexes" between the two thoroughbreds. Ruffian fractured her right foreleg and, after post-surgery difficulty, had to be euthanized the following day.
- Fifty-two people, most of them students in Pakistan who were on their way to a vacation at Abbottabad, were killed when their bus fell into a ravine.
- Warren A. Klope shattered the world record for stone skipping after sending a flat rock that bounced 24 times along the waters of Lake Superior. Breaking the former world record of 21 skips, set by Carl Weiholdt of Denmark in 1957, Klope's mark was set at the annual International Stone Skipping Tournament at Mackinac Island, Michigan.
- British commercial divers Peter Walsh and Peter Carson were killed while working from the Celtic Surveyor in Scapa Flow when they were sucked into a pipeline due to the differential pressures inside and outside the pipe. Carson, the first stand-by diver, was sent down after Walsh was sucked into the pipe, and was also sucked in. A third diver was then sent down and was also sucked into the pipe, but managed to escape as the pressures equalised.
- Born: 50 Cent (stage name for Curtis Jackson III), American rapper; in New York City

== July 7, 1975 (Monday) ==
- The U.S. state of Alaska had its highest recorded temperatures ever, with the capital at Juneau registering at 90 °F (32 °C) for the first time, a mark that has not been exceeded since then. Other high temperatures registered that day were 86° at Fairbanks and at Sitka, but only 68° at Anchorage. By contrast, Miami Beach, Florida, was slightly cooler than Juneau, with a high of 89°.
- The play For Colored Girls Who Have Considered Suicide When the Rainbow Is Enuf, by Ntozake Shange, often shortened to For Colored Girls, was given its first public performance, at New York City's Studio Rivbea. In 1976, it would begin an 867 performance run on Broadway, at the Booth Theatre.
- Died:
  - W. V. D. Hodge, 72, Scottish mathematician who developed Hodge theory, the geometry of the differentiable manifold
  - Jacob Bjerknes, 77, American meteorologist
  - Ruffian, 3, American racehorse
  - George Morgan, 51, American country music singer, father of Lorrie Morgan, and inductee of Country Music Hall of Fame.

== July 8, 1975 (Tuesday) ==
- U.S. President Gerald R. Ford announced that he would run for President of the United States in 1976, in his first try for national office. Ford, described as "the first unelected President" because he had not run for either the Presidency or the Vice-Presidency, had succeeded Richard Nixon after having been appointed U.S. Vice-President in 1974.
- An earthquake in the Burmese city of Bagan, ancient capital of the Kingdom of Pagan, damaged most of the important structures dating from the 13th Century, many beyond repair, and 80 percent of the city's Buddhist temples.

== July 9, 1975 (Wednesday) ==
- Four months before the November 11 date set for Angola to become independent from Portugal, the separate liberation organizations began fighting among themselves, as the People's Movement for the Liberation of Angola (MPLA), led by Agostinho Neto, attacked the capital at Luanda, which was under the control of the National Liberation Front of Angola (FNLA), led by Holden Roberto. The Soviet Union would send aid and Cuba would send troops to support the MPLA, while the United States would support FNLA and South Africa would send troops. The MPLA would be successful in taking over Luanda, and Neto would become Angola's first President.
- Dutch photographer and artist Bas Jan Ader departed on a yacht from Cape Cod, in the U.S. state of Massachusetts in an attempt to make an unassisted voyage from west to east of the North Atlantic Ocean. He was never seen in public again. His unmanned 13 feet (4.0 m) boat, Ocean Wave would be found on April 18, 1976, partially capsized, about 115 miles (185 km) southwest of Ireland.
- The National Assembly of Senegal passed a law providing for a multi-party system of government, albeit highly restricted and under government control.
- The British rock band The Rolling Stones began a five-night run of sold-out concerts at the Los Angeles Forum as part of their 1975 Tour of The Americas.
- Born:
  - Jack White (stage name for John Anthony Gillis), American alternative rock musician and founder of The White Stripes; in Detroit
  - Shelton Benjamin, American professional wrestler; in Orangeburg, South Carolina

== July 10, 1975 (Thursday) ==
- A ceasefire, mediated by the Organization of African Unity, was reached between the African nations of Upper Volta (now Burkina Faso), and its bordering nations of Mali and Niger.
- Foreign Minister (and future Prime Minister) James Callaghan of the United Kingdom flew to Uganda to personally request Ugandan dictator Idi Amin to release Briton Denis Hills, who had been threatened with execution for his criticism of Amin. Hills and Callaghan would leave Uganda the next day.
- Born: Stefán Karl Stefánsson, Icelandic actor best known for his role as Robbie Rotten on the show LazyTown, as well as his popularity as an Internet meme throughout Reddit and multiple other websites; in Hafnarfjörður (died of cancer, 2018)

== July 11, 1975 (Friday) ==
- The Los Angeles City Council voted 10-1 to approve a $750 million project for "The biggest downtown redevelopment plan any American city had ever taken on", with 255 city blocks to be affected.
- The archaeology community marked July 11, 1975 as a pivotal moment in the Terracotta Army excavation: that's when archaeologists completed the initial unearthing of Emperor Qin Shi Huang's burial pits, revealing approximately 8,000 terracotta soldiers and horses guarding his tomb. Discovered by local farmers digging a well in March 1974, the site contains life-size warriors arranged in military formations, along with chariots and horses, many still holding real weapons like swords and crossbows.
- Died:
  - Andrew W. Cordier, 74, United Nations official who helped defuse the Cuban Missile Crisis
  - Martin Cox, 17, at the time the longest survivor of a liver transplant. Cox was two days short of the sixth anniversary of the July 13, 1969 transplant.

== July 12, 1975 (Saturday) ==
- São Tomé and Príncipe was granted independence from Portugal, as Portuguese Admiral Antonio Rosa Coutinho and Sao Tome Assembly President Xavier Dias signed documents ending Portugal's colonial rule. Manuel Pinto da Costa was sworn in as President afterward, along with Miguel Trovoada as Prime Minister. Pinto da Costa would jail Trovoada and become dictator in 1979, while setting about to create a Marxist economy that would lower production of the nation's largest export (cocoa) by two-thirds in a decade, before yielding to a multiparty system in 1989.
- Four jets of the Spanish Air Force's acrobatic team, rehearsing for an airshow, collided during formation flying after taking off from the Murcia–San Javier Airport. All five persons on board were killed.

== July 13, 1975 (Sunday) ==
- Dirk Fisher, working with his father Mel Fisher, found the first definite proof that the wreckage of the Spanish ship Nuestra Señora de Atocha was in the area, finding five bronze cannons 40 miles off of the Florida coast. The Atocha had sunk in a storm in 1622, carrying with it 47 tons of silver and 27 tons of gold. One week later, on July 20, Dirk, his wife Angel, and another member of the team, Rick Gage, would die when their ship, the Northwind, sank in a storm. The Atocha would finally be located on July 20, 1985, ten years to the day after Dirk had drowned.
- Died:
  - Judith Graham Pool, 56, American physician who developed the cryoprecipitate, a blood clotting agent for treatment of hemophilia, died of a brain tumor.
  - Thomas Walter Swan, 97, American jurist and judge on the United States Court of Appeals for the Second Circuit from 1926 until 1975 (b. 1877).

== July 14, 1975 (Monday) ==
- South Africa began aiding the National Liberation Front of Angola (FNLA) and the National Union for the Total Independence of Angola (UNITA), pro-Western Angolan independence fighters, against the Marxist People's Movement for the Liberation of Angola (MPLA), which had taken control of the capital of Angola earlier in the month. U.S. President Ford, on recommendation of Secretary of State Kissinger, signed an order four days later to begin Operation IA Feature, providing American financial aid to FNLA and UNITA as well.
- Guinea re-established diplomatic relations with France, 17 years after voting complete independence from French colonial authorities, and a decade after the two nations closed their embassies.

== July 15, 1975 (Tuesday) ==
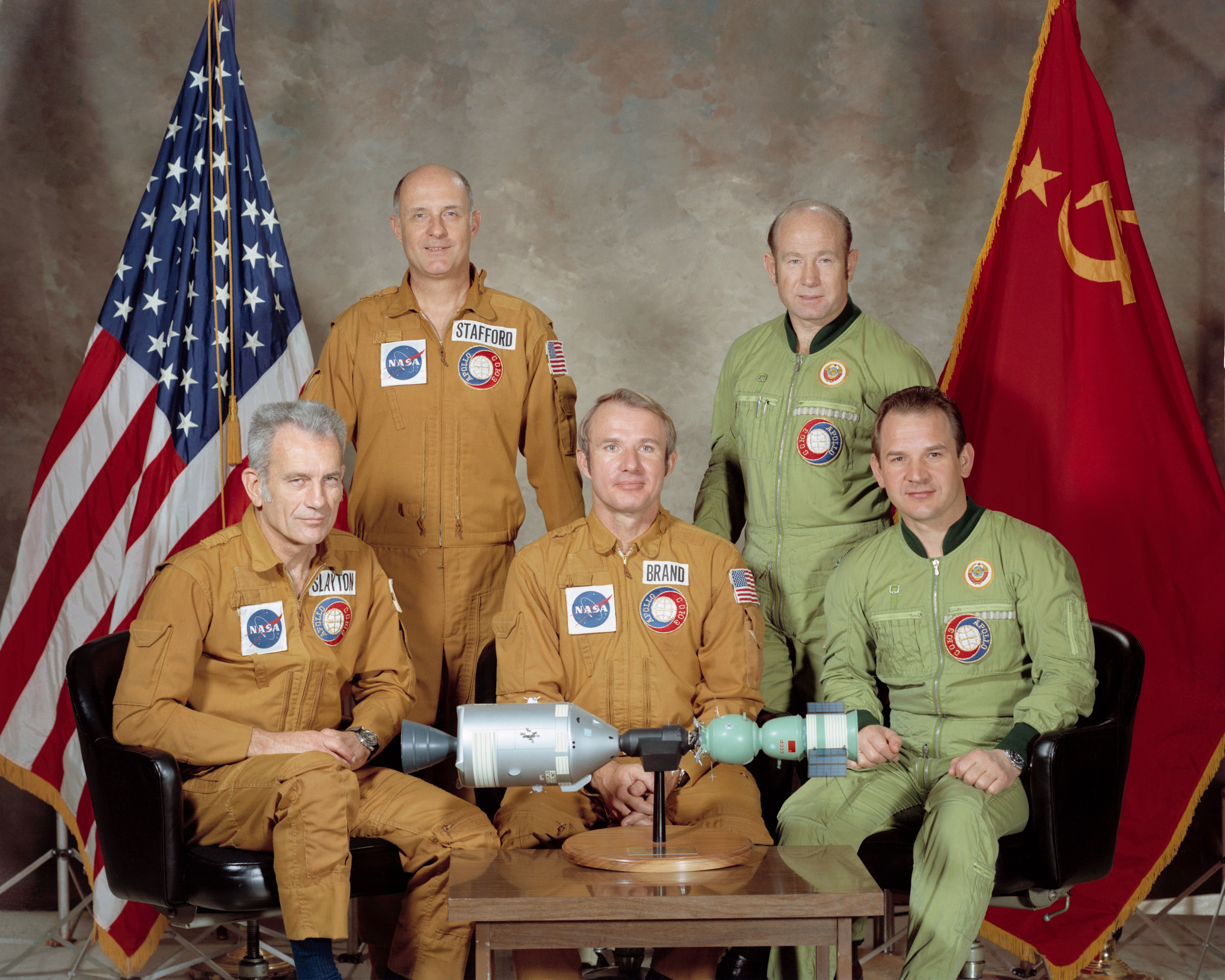
American and Soviet crews

- The first Apollo rocket mission since Apollo 17's 1972 trip to the Moon lifted off from Cape Canaveral at 3:50 pm with a crew of three. In the last use of the enormous Saturn rocket on a crewed mission, Donald "Deke" Slayton, Vance Brand, and Brigadier General Thomas Stafford were sent into space about eight hours after the launching of a Soyuz rocket with Alexei Leonov (the first man to walk in space) and Valeri Kubasov, who went up at 4:20 pm from the Soviet Union (7:20 am in Florida). Slayton, who had been one of the original seven Mercury astronauts before being grounded in 1962 because of a heart murmur, radioed to ground control, "I'll tell you, this is worth waiting 16 years for!"
- An unidentified man on National Airlines Flight 1601 committed suicide by self-immolation as the DC-10 flew from New York to Miami. The man locked himself in an airplane restroom, put fuel on himself and then set himself ablaze. Nobody else was injured as the plane made an emergency landing in Jacksonville.
- Saensak Muangsurin of Thailand defeated World Boxing Council light welterweight champion Perico Fernández of Spain with a technical knockout (TKO) in the 8th round in a bout in Bangkok, setting a record for taking the shortest time to win the world title after going professional. His first pro bout had been eight months earlier, on November 11, 1974.
- Born:
  - Jill Halfpenny, British actress; in Gateshead, Tyne and Wear
  - Said Bahaji, German-Moroccan terrorist and 9/11 plotter; in Haselünne, Niedersachsen state, West Germany (d. 2013)
- Died:
  - Charles Weidman, 73, American choreographer
  - Modoc, 78, the oldest elephant in captivity, died at the San Francisco Zoo. Her story would later be novelized in 1998 in a children's book by Ralph Helfer, Modoc: The True Story of the Greatest Elephant That Ever Lived.

== July 16, 1975 (Wednesday) ==
- The evacuation of thousands of Portuguese nationals, who were preparing to move away from Angola in advance of its scheduled independence from Portugal in November, began as the airline Swissair began sending jets to Luanda during a temporary lull in the Angolan civil war.
- Died: Lester Dragstedt, 81, American surgeon who, in 1955, was the first person to successfully separate siamese twins.

== July 17, 1975 (Thursday) ==
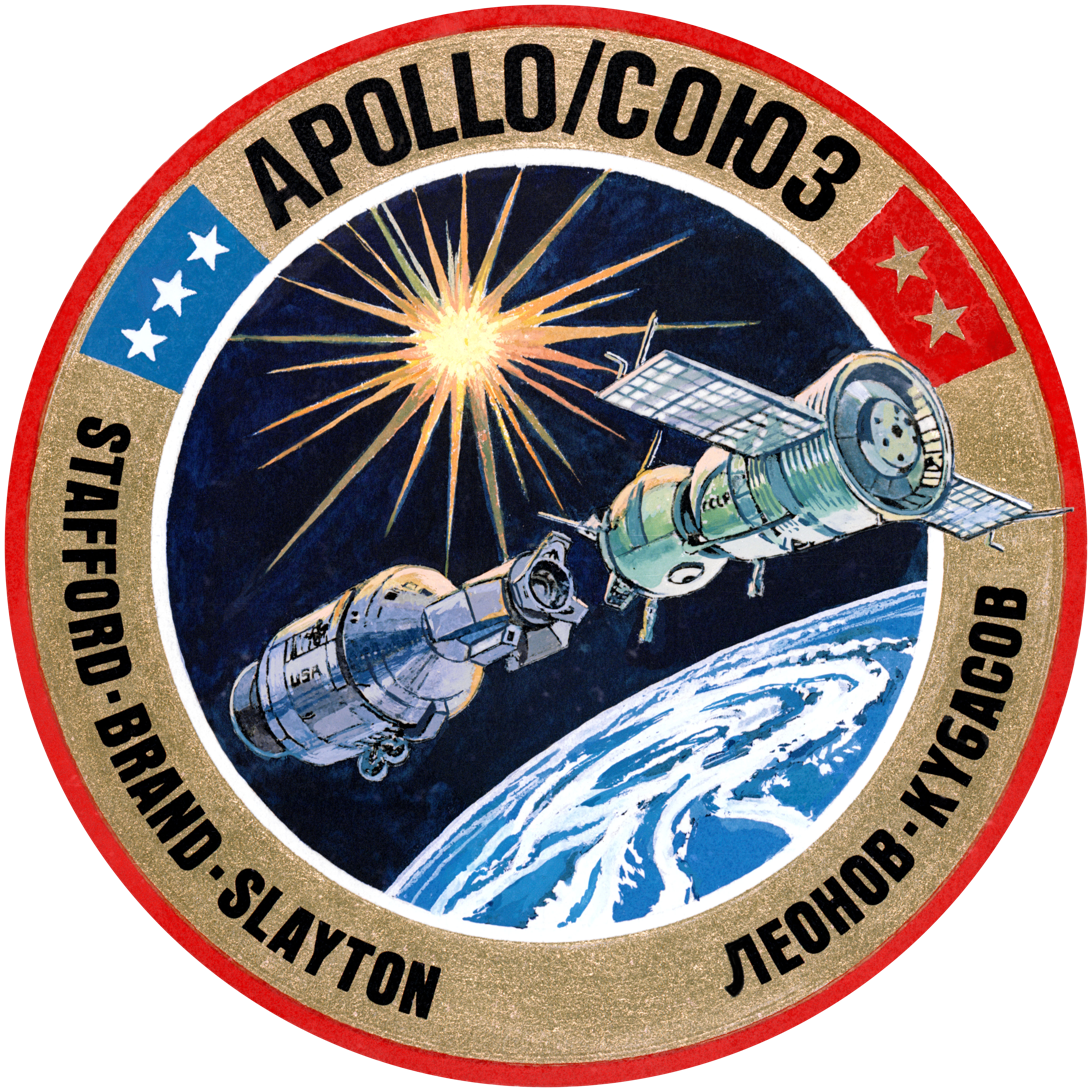

- A crewed American Apollo spacecraft and the crewed Soviet Soyuz spacecraft for the Soyuz 19 mission, docked in orbit, marking the first such link-up between spacecraft from the two nations. At 3:19 pm Washington time (10:19 pm in Moscow), Peering through the opened hatches into the Apollo's connecting module, Colonel Leonov welcomed General Stafford with the English words, “Glad to see you.” General Stafford, replying in Russian, said: “A, zdraystvuite, ochen rad vas videt” (“Ah, hello, very glad to see you.”). Apollo commander Tom Stafford and Soyuz commander Alexei Leonov shook hands. Deke Slayton then joined Stafford in boarding the Soyuz ship, where the astronauts remained for two more hours.
- A commuter train in Rio de Janeiro, Brazil, with more than 1,000 people on board, derailed. A fire department spokesman said that more than 100 people had been killed and at least 300 injured, while a railroad official called the number "absurd" and said that "The official number of dead is 13."
- Japan's Crown Prince (and later, Emperor) Akihito, and his wife, Princess Michito, narrowly missed being struck by a Molotov cocktail thrown at them by protesters during a visit to the city of Naha on Okinawa.
- Most of the coffee crop in the Brazilian state of Paraná was destroyed by the Geada Negra ("Black Frost"), when unusually low temperatures brought snow to much of the tropical region.
- Born:
  - Elena Anaya, Spanish actress; in Palencia
  - Cecile De France, Belgian actress; in Namur
  - Terence Tao, Australian-born American mathematician; in Adelaide
  - Konnie Huq, English TV presenter; in Hammersmith, Greater London
- Died: Konstantine Gamsakhurdia, 82, Soviet Georgian writer

== July 18, 1975 (Friday) ==
- U.S. President Ford secretly communicated to Congress his decision to authorize $6,000,000 for a CIA operation to combat Marxist soldiers. The plans for Operation IA Feature did not specify the nature of the operation, nor even where it was taking place, but were an intervention in the Angolan Civil War to support the pro-Western National Liberation Front of Angola (FNLA) and National Union for the Total Independence of Angola (UNITA)) against the ruling Marxist regime, the People's Movement for the Liberation of Angola (MPLA).
- A threatened nationwide strike of American railroad workers was called off suddenly after the railroads and the unions signed a pact in Washington.
- Died: Vaughn Bode, 33, American underground comics artist

== July 19, 1975 (Saturday) ==
- President Siaka Stevens of Sierra Leone had fourteen former government and military officials executed by firing squad for conspiring to overthrow him.
- Bruce Springsteen and the E Street Band (named for a street in Belmar, New Jersey) completed the recording of the classic rock album Born to Run.
- Died:
  - William "Lefty" Frizzell, 47, American country singer and songwriter, died of a stroke
  - Winifred Ashby, 95, British-born American pathologist
  - U.S. Navy Admiral Charles A. Pownall, 87, who served from 1946 to 1949 as the last U.S. Military Governor of Guam

== July 20, 1975 (Sunday) ==
- The comic strip Pogo ran for the last time, almost two years after the death of its creator, Walt Kelly, and 26 years after it was first published nationwide.
- Born: Ray Allen, American NBA player; in Merced, California

== July 21, 1975 (Monday) ==
- Title IX of the Education Amendments of 1972 went into effect in the United States, along with regulations from the U.S. Department of Health, Education and Welfare, after which all American universities, colleges and schools that received federal funding were required to provide the same level of funding for women's and girls' sports programs as had been spent for men and boys.
- The Parliament of India voted to approve Prime Minister Indira Gandhi's declaration of a state of emergency, with a 301-76 vote in the lower house and a 147-32 vote in the upper house.
- Born: David Dastmalchian, American character actor and producer; in Allentown, Pennsylvania
- Died: Billy West, 82, American silent film actor and director

== July 22, 1975 (Tuesday) ==
- Uprisings began across Afghanistan as the Mujahideen led an unsuccessful revolt against the government of President Mohammed Daoud Khan. The Islamist rebels attacked government headquarters in the provinces of Badakhshan, Laghman, Logar, and Panjshir.
- A German commuter train, en route from Hamburg to Cuxhaven, crashed into a freight train coming the other way, killing 8 people and injuring 24.
- Born: Kenshin Kawakami, Japanese baseball pitcher (2004 Central League MVP, 2009-10 MLB player); in Tokushima City
- Died: Emlen Tunnell, 50, NFL defensive back and the first African-American inductee into the Pro Football Hall of Fame and the first black assistant coach in the NFL, died of a heart attack at the New York Giants training camp in Pleasantville, New York. "Em Tunnell, a Popular Giant, Dead at 50", Daily News (New York City), July 24, 1975, p. 87

== July 23, 1975 (Wednesday) ==
- Paul Allen and Bill Gates of "Micro-Soft", inventors of the Altair BASIC software program, written to be operated on the new Altair 8800 computer, signed a contract giving Altair manufacturer MITS the exclusive use of the software for ten years.
- A bill to lift a ban on American weapons sales to Turkey, failed 206-233 in the U.S. House of Representatives. Turkey's government would retaliate by closing American military bases there.

== July 24, 1975 (Thursday) ==
- The Apollo space program came to an end as Thomas Stafford, Vance Brand and Deke Slayton, with parachutes bringing their space capsule down to a recovery on the Pacific Ocean. The "splashdown" would be the last water landing of a crewed space mission for more than 45 years, with cosmonauts landing their capsules in the desert, or astronauts landing on a runway in a space shuttle. On August 2, 2020, the SpaceX Demo-2 mission would successfully splashdown in the Gulf of Mexico with astronauts Doug Hurley and Bob Behnken. The U.S. would not venture into space again until 1981.
- The Philippines and Thailand announced that they would gradually withdraw and dismantle SEATO, the Southeast Asia Treaty Organization, 21 years after the alliance had been formed in 1954 to halt the spread of Communism in Southeast Asia.
- India's Parliament voted to amend the constitution to prohibit the nation's courts from considering any challenge to the June 26 emergency decree. As opposition legislators boycotted the sessions, the measure passed 342-1 and 164-0 in the lower and upper houses.
- Born: Eric Szmanda, American TV actor known for the original CSI: Crime Scene Investigation; in Milwaukee
- Died: Barbara Colby, 35, American TV actress. Ms. Colby, who had just gotten her first major television role, as a regular on the new TV show Phyllis, had completed filming of her third episode when she and actor James Kiernan were gunned down in a drive-by shooting. She died at the scene, and Kiernan died 40 minutes later. The killers were never apprehended.

== July 25, 1975 (Friday) ==
- The musical A Chorus Line began a fifteen-year run on Broadway, in the first of 6,137 performances at the Shubert Theatre
- Angered after the U.S. House of Representatives voted against lifting a ban of military aid to Turkey, the Turkish government declared that "The joint defense agreement of July 3, 1969... and other related agreements, have lost their legal validity. Within the context of this situation, the operation of all joint defense installations... will cease as of tomorrow." A NATO base at Incirklik was exempt from the order.
- Portugal's 30 man Supreme Revolutionary Council, which had ruled the nation since 1974, turned over control of the government to three generals, Premier Vasco Gonçalves, President Francisco da Costa Gomes, and National Security Director Otelo Saraiva de Carvalho.
- The traditional price of five cents for a roundtrip ride on the Staten Island Ferry was brought to an end by a 34-2 vote of the New York City council. The new fare would be 25 cents.

== July 26, 1975 (Saturday) ==
- Pyotr Klimuk and Vitaly Sevastyanov returned to Earth in Soyuz 18, having set a new Soviet space endurance record of almost 63 days (62 days 23 hours 20 minutes 8 seconds) after having been launched on May 24. During the period from July 15 to July 21, the two cosmonauts on Soyuz 18 had been in orbit at the same time as the five people in the Apollo–Soyuz project (two Soviet cosmonauts and three U.S. astronauts), the seven space travelers having tied the record set in October 1969 by seven cosmonauts. This was the second of three missions designated as "Soyuz 18".
- China was able to place a satellite into orbit for the first time since 1971, and only the third time in its history, after April 24, 1970 and March 3, 1971. The Ji Shu Shiyan Weixing I was destroyed after 50 days in orbit.
- Ethiopia's revolutionary government issued Proclamation No. 27, nationalizing almost all land in the former Empire. Families were allowed to own no more than one house, and no more than 500 square meters of unoccupied land. Everything else was confiscated by the government, which then rented out the surplus to low income families.
- The Hustle, by Van McCoy and celebrating the most popular new dance in America, became the #1 song in the United States.
- The second season of the World Football League opened with a provision that players would receive a percentage of the game revenues, as the San Antonio Wings beat the visiting Charlotte Hornets, 27-10.
- Born: Liz Truss (Mary Elizabeth Truss), Prime Minister of the United Kingdom from September 6 to October 24, 2022 after being elected leader of the Conservative Party; in Oxford

== July 27, 1975 (Sunday) ==
- Thailand's Prime Minister Kukrit Pramoj announced that all military agreements with the United States were at an end, and ordered that all American troops were to leave Thailand by March 20, 1976.
- In his nationally syndicated weekly column, astrologer Sydney Omarr predicted a "hot-weather, colorful week" in which "Leo, Aquarius persons grab headlines", noting that "Aquarians in the news during this 'hot week' could include such persons as Hank Aaron, James Hoffa and Betty Friedan." Hoffa would be in the news four days later after disappearing.
- Born:
  - Alex Rodriguez, American MLB player nicknamed "A-Rod", and highest paid baseball player in history; in New York City
  - Taïg Khris, Algerian-born inline skating champion; in Algiers
- Died:
  - Anne Spencer, 93, African-American poet
  - Alfred Duraiappah, 49, the mayor of the Sri Lanka city of Jaffna, was assassinated along with two of his associates, while on his way to prayers at a Hindu temple. The killer was 20-year-old Velupillai Prabhakaran, founder of the Tamil Tigers separatist group, Mayor Duraiappah had been blamed for the January 10, 1974 killing of 9 people by police in Jaffna.

== July 28, 1975 (Monday) ==
- Following through with the order for closure of American bases in Turkey, Turkish military commanders entered five U.S. bases to take control, and pledged to take control of 20 more the next day. The five, located at Karamürsel, Sinop, Pirinçlik, Bebasi and Karaburun, had been used for intelligence gathering along the Soviet border.
- Died:
  - Donald Mattison, 70, American artist
  - Jean Chalvet, 82, former French Governor of Ubangi-Shari, now the Central African Republic, 1946–48

== July 29, 1975 (Tuesday) ==
- Nigeria's President, Major General Yakubu Gowon, was overthrown while he was out of the country at a meeting of the Organization of African Unity in Uganda. Joseph Nanvan Garba, commander of Gowon's bodyguards, took control of radio stations in the capital, Lagos, to broadcast the coup announcement, imposed a curfew, ordered most vehicles off of the street, and shut down the capital's international airport and telecommunications. Brigadier General Murtala Mohammed became the new President the next day, and deposed President Jack Gowon declared from Uganda that "I pledge my full loyalty to the nation and the new government".
- Chinese troops killed hundreds of rebels and civilians of the predominantly Muslim Hui minority in the village of Shadian in the Yunnan Province. Over a period of eight days of fighting, 900 Hui were killed in the village of Shadian, and hundreds more died in surrounding villages, while more than 400 soldiers of the People's Liberation Army lost their lives.
- The Organization of American States voted 16-3 to discontinue 15 years of sanctions against Fidel Castro by all member nations, and to allow each member to determine its own relations with Cuba. Chile, Paraguay and Uruguay opposed, and Brazil and Nicaragua abstained from the resolution.
- Gerald Ford became the first U.S. President to visit the Nazi concentration camp Auschwitz in Brzezinka, Poland. "Horrible, unbelievable," the President muttered moments after touching down by helicopter. He wrote his name in a guest book, beneath the scrawled sentiment "This monument and the memory of those it honors inspire us further to the dedicated pursuit of peace, cooperation and security for all peoples."
- Turkish officers took control of all 24 American military bases in Turkey.
- The first shipment of American weapons to rebels in Angola was made with the departure of a U.S. Air Force C-141 military transport plane from Charleston, South Carolina to Zaire, for use by the UNITA forces.

== July 30, 1975 (Wednesday) ==
- Near Detroit, former Teamsters Union president Jimmy Hoffa was reported missing after his car was found abandoned outside of the Machus Red Fox, a restaurant in Bloomfield Hills, Michigan, where he had said he had an appointment to have lunch with a longtime friend, Detroit mobster Anthony Giacalone. Giacalone denied being aware of any plans for a luncheon date. A missing persons report was filed the next day after Hoffa failed to return to his home in Lake Orion. Neither Hoffa, nor his body, had been found more than 49 years after he vanished.
- By a single vote (214-213), the U.S. House of Representatives joined the U.S. Senate in approving pay raises for Congressmen, federal judges, the U.S. Vice-President and other U.S. officials. The President's annual salary remained at $200,000. On the same day, the House voted 228-189 to remove price limits on American gasoline, effective August 31.
- The U.S. Senate voted 71-21 to declare one of the two seats for New Hampshire vacant, as both John A. Durkin and Louis C. Wyman continued to claim that they had won the November 1974 election to replace Senator Norris Cotton, whose term had expired in January. Cotton was then appointed to return to his former seat as the interim Senator until elections could be held.
- Born: Kate Starbird, American college and professional (ABL and WNBA) basketball player; in West Point, New York
- Died: James Blish, 54, American-born British science fiction author known for the Cities in Flight series and for his adaptation of Star Trek episodes to books of short stories, died of lung cancer

== July 31, 1975 (Thursday) ==
- Three members of a popular Irish pop group, The Miami Showband, were murdered by terrorists near the Northern Ireland town of Newry, while returning from a performance at Banbridge. Their van was flagged down by members of the Ulster Volunteer Force, who were wearing British Army uniforms and who had set up a phony checkpoint. While the van occupants were being lined up, two of the UVF men were trying to place a time bomb underneath the vehicle. The bomb went off prematurely, killing the two UVF men, and the rest of the terrorists shot the five bandmembers, killing lead singer Fran O'Toole, trumpeter Brian McCoy and guitarist Tony Geraghty. The other two bandmembers, bassist Stephen Travers and saxophone player Des McAlea, were wounded.
- The television show Almost Anything Goes, pitting teams from three small towns against each other in a competition that mixed athletics and stunts, was first broadcast. The competition for the "Eastern Conference Championship", involved Webster, Massachusetts, Burrillville, Rhode Island, and Putnam, Connecticut, all near the point where the three states' borders met.
- Ethiopia dropped all claims that it had had to Djibouti, the African colony of France once known as French Somaliland. Djibouti would become independent two years later.
- Born:
  - Elissa Steamer, American skateboarder and four-time X Games gold medalist; in Fort Myers, Florida
  - Stephanie Hirst, British radio & TV presenter; in Barnsley, South Yorkshire
