= June 1975 =

Month of 1975

<<	June 1975					>>
Su	Mo	Tu	We	Th	Fr	Sa
1	2	3	4	5	6	7
8	9	10	11	12	13	14
15	16	17	18	19	20	21
22	23	24	25	26	27	28
29	30

The following events occurred in June 1975:

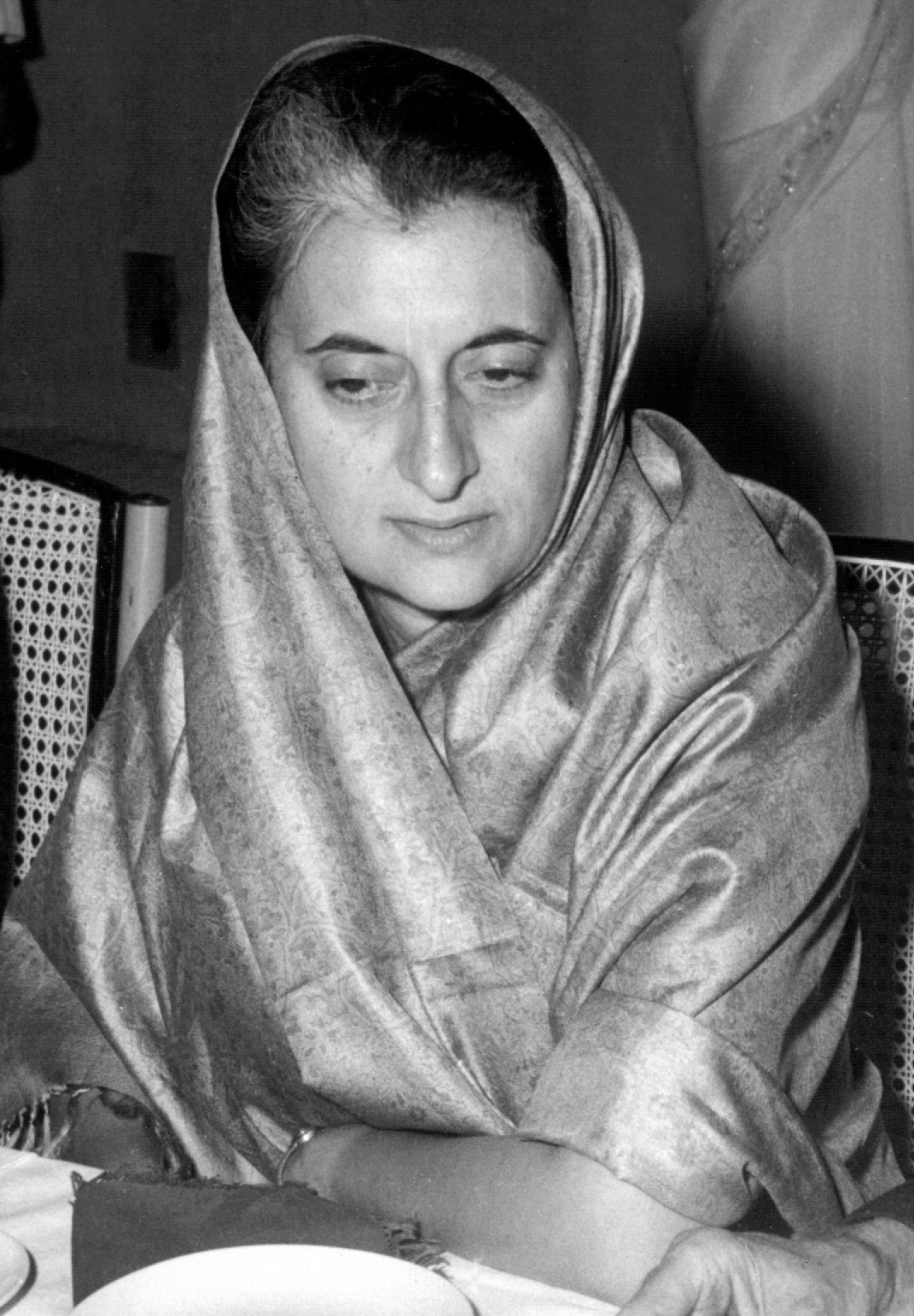
June 26, 1975: India's Prime Minister Indira Gandhi declares national emergency and suspends democratic process after being ruled ineligible for office

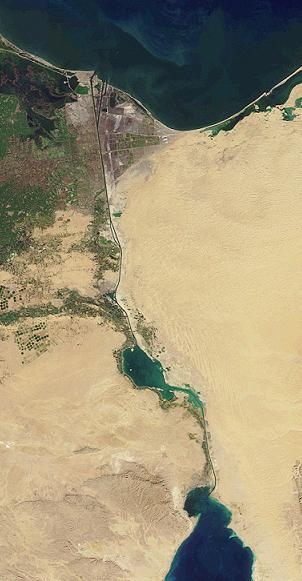
June 5, 1975: Suez Canal reopens after being closed for eight years

June 25, 1975: People's Republic of Mozambique declared

== June 1, 1975 (Sunday) ==
- U.S. President Gerald R. Ford arrived in Salzburg, Austria for a meeting with Egypt's President Anwar Sadat, and slipped and fell on the stairway while descending from Air Force One. Pictures of the tumbling U.S. President were seen again and again, giving Ford a reputation for being clumsy, both physically and in his handling of the presidency.
- Born: Nikol Pashinyan, Armenian politician, Prime Minister of Armenia, in Ijevan, Armenian SSR

== June 2, 1975 (Monday) ==
- Prime Minister Yitzhak Rabin announced that Israel would remove tanks, troops and weapons from the Suez Canal as a peace gesture to Egypt.

== June 3, 1975 (Tuesday) ==
- New federal regulations, set to go into effect on July 21, were sent to Congress by the U.S. Department of Health, Education and Welfare. The new rules ended separate phys ed classes for boys and girls, and prohibited schools from excluding pregnant students from the classroom.
- Sultan Alimirah Hanfere, leader of Ethiopia's Afar people and of the Afar Liberation Front, declared war on the Ethiopian government.
- Uganda's President Idi Amin declared the nationalization of all land within the boundaries of Uganda.
- The Broadway musical Chicago premiered at the 46th Street Theatre and ran for 936 performances, closing on August 27, 1977.
- The first recorded ascent of the 22,740 feet (6,930 m) Himalayan mountain Kalanka was achieved by Japanese climbers Ikuo Tanabe, Noriaki Ikeda, Tsuneo Kouma, and Kazumasa Inoue.
- Died:
  - Eisaku Satō, 74, Prime Minister of Japan 1964-72, recipient of the Nobel Peace Prize in 1974
  - Ozzie Nelson, 69, American actor best known for The Adventures of Ozzie and Harriet.

== June 4, 1975 (Wednesday) ==
- Israel completed its promise to withdraw half of its occupying troops from Egypt's Sinai peninsula.
- Born:
  - Angelina Jolie, American film actress, as Angelina Joline Voight, in Los Angeles
  - Julian Marley, Jamaican reggae musician, in London
  - Russell Brand, English comedian and actor, in Grays.
- Died:
  - Evelyn Brent, 73, American actress
  - Clark Kessinger, 78, American fiddler

== June 5, 1975 (Thursday) ==
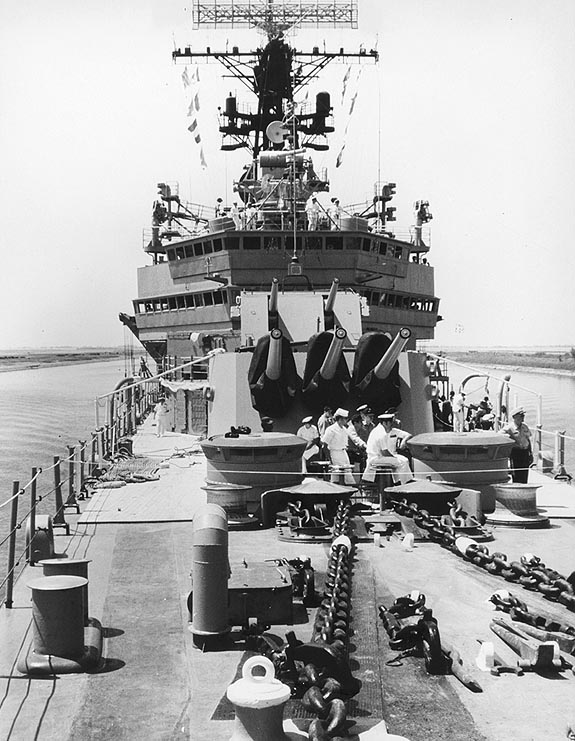
USS Little Rock on the Suez Canal

- The Suez Canal opened for the first time since the Six-Day War eight years earlier. Because there were still mines left in the waters from 1967, the American guided missile cruiser USS Little Rock made the first transit, sailing from Port Said, where Egypt's President Sadat oversaw the celebration, to Ismailia.
- In the first yes-or-no referendum ever held in the United Kingdom, the electorate voted to stay in the European Community by a margin of 17,378,581 to 8,470,073.
- Died: Paul Keres, 59, Estonian chess grandmaster

== June 6, 1975 (Friday) ==
- A helicopter landed inside the grounds of the Southern Michigan Prison at Jackson at 11:05 am, picked up long time inmate Dale Remling, and departed again. Remling was re-captured two days later in Leslie, Michigan.
- A night train running between London Euston and Glasgow Central derails at Nuneaton, Warwickshire, England due to overspeeding through a temporary track restriction, leading to 6 deaths and another 38 injuries.
- Died: Larry Blyden, 49, American stage actor and producer who won the Tony Award for Best Featured Actor in a Musical in 1972 for his performance in A Funny Thing Happened on the Way to the Forum, as well as a game show host known for of What's My Line?, died of injuries sustained in an auto accident in Morocco on May 31.

== June 7, 1975 (Saturday) ==
- General Paul Strehlin, former French Air Force Chief of Staff, was run over by a bus in Paris, hours after being revealed to have secretly been on the payroll of the Northrop aircraft manufacturing company. He would die of his injuries on June 22.
- A new constitution was adopted for Greece by a 208-0 vote in the Vouli ton Ellinon, the 300 member Greek Parliament, formally replacing the monarchy with a republic. All of the votes were by members of the ruling Nea Dimokratia (New Democracy) party, as members of the other parties boycotted the vote in protest over the power given to the President.
- The first Cricket World Cup for One Day International (ODI) cricket under the auspices of the International Cricket Conference, opened in England with all eight of the invited national teams competing for "Prudential Cup '75", sponsored by the Prudential Insurance Company. Group A had England, New Zealand, India and East Africa, while Group B had the West Indies, Australia, Pakistan and Sri Lanka. Under the format, the teams in each group would play each other once (for a total of three games) and the top two teams in each group would qualify for a "knockout stage" playoff, with the first place finisher of one group playing the second place finisher of the other group. The first games were played simultaneously in London, Birmingham, Leeds and Manchester.
- After coming in second at the Kentucky Derby, a new jockey, Bill Shoemaker, won the Belmont Stakes aboard Avatar wins in a time of 2:28.2; retired to stud for the 1977 season, Avatar went on to become the sire of 19 stakes winners before his 1992 death.
- Born: Allen Iverson, American NBA player, 2001 MVP, 4-time scoring leader, 3-time steals leader; in Hampton, Virginia

== June 8, 1975 (Sunday) ==
- The Venera 9 space probe was launched by the Soviet Union to explore the planet Venus. It would land on Venus on October 22 at 13:12 Venus solar time (0513 UTC) and transmit data for 53 minutes.
- Two passenger trains collided head on near Munich, West Germany, killing 38 people.
- Born: Shilpa Shetty, Indian film actress, in Mangalore

== June 9, 1975 (Monday) ==
- A fire inside a jail at Sanford, Florida, killed eleven people; most of the inmates were trapped in their cells.
- Born: Andrew Symonds, English-born Australian cricketer, in Birmingham
- Sohail Abbas, former contribution player for Pakistan men's national hockey team (1998-2012) and bronze medal for 2000 Summer Olympics, total scored 348 and 311 caps, in Karachi, Sindh Province, Pakistan.

== June 10, 1975 (Tuesday) ==
- At a press conference in New York City, Pelé, the Brazilian superstar footballer, signed a contract with the New York Cosmos of the North American Soccer League that made him the highest paid professional athlete in the world. The salary for Pelé, who grew up in poverty, was $4,700,000 for 107 regular season games for the Cosmos in 1975, 1976, and 1977.
- In Washington, DC, the Rockefeller Commission issued its report on CIA abuses, recommending a joint congressional oversight committee on intelligence.

== June 11, 1975 (Wednesday) ==
- The United Kingdom became an oil-producing nation as the first crude oil was pumped from a well drilled into the North Sea. The Transworld 58 submersible drilling rig, located 180 miles off of the coast of Scotland, pumped the first oil from the Argyll oil field into the tanker Theogennitor.
- The U.S House of Representatives voted 209 to 187 to reject President Ford's proposal for a 23 cent federal fuel tax on each gallon of gasoline sold in the U.S. The President had promoted the tax as a step in eliminating U.S. dependency on foreign oil by 1985.
- Alice Olson, whose husband Frank Olson had jumped to his death more than 20 years earlier, on November 28, 1953, learned for the first time that her husband had been the subject of secret CIA experiments with the hallucinogenic drug LSD. Mrs. Olson had been unaware of the CIA's role in her husband's death until reading the details in a front-page story in that morning's Washington Post, and recognized the unidentified "civilian employee" of the U.S. Army referred to in the story headlined "Suicide Revealed". The news item, in turn, was drawn from the recently released report of the Rockefeller Commission on CIA activities.
- The new Communist government of South Vietnam sent an order to all "puppet soldiers" of the losing Army of the Republic of Vietnam (ARVN), directing soldiers to attend three days of "re-education" (hoc tap), and former officers to bring supplies for one month of training. Most of the officers, complying with the order, were imprisoned for more than one month.
- Born: Choi Ji-woo, South Korean actress and model, in Paju

== June 12, 1975 (Thursday) ==
- At 9:35 a.m., Judge Jagmohanlal Sinha of the city of Allahabad ruled that India's Prime Minister Indira Gandhi had used corrupt practices to win her seat in the Indian Parliament, and that she should be banned from holding any public office. Her main opponent for the Raebareli Constituency seat in 1971, Raj Narain had brought a petition to unseat her, charging that she had won the 1971 parliamentary election improperly. Mrs. Gandhi sent word that she refused to resign.
- The Australian Family Law Act 1975, allowing "no-fault divorce" was given assent, to take effect on January 5, 1976.
- Movimiento Nacional General Secretary Fernando Herrero Tejedor, who had been expected to succeed Carlos Arias Navarro as Prime Minister of Spain, was killed in an automobile accident near the city of Villacastín.
- Greece applied for membership in the European Union, and would become a member state in 1981.
- Systran made the most successful demonstration of machine translation up to that time, as professors and military officers in Zürich watched the computer translate 30,000 words of Russian text into English.
- Died: Edward G. Connors, 42, former welterweight boxer and an organized crime figure in Boston, was set up for a hit by Whitey Bulger and Howie Winter, in retaliation for talking too much. Winter directed Connors to appear at a specific phone booth in Dorchester, Massachusetts. While Connors was engaged in conversation, Bulger and his partner Stephen Flemmi drove up and fired multiple shots into the phone booth.

== June 13, 1975 (Friday) ==
- In Baghdad, Iraq and Iran signed a peace treaty formalizing an agreement reached in Algiers. After the monarchy in Iran was replaced by a republic, Iraq's President Saddam Hussein would declare the agreement void on September 17, 1980, seize the Shatt al-Arab river dividing the two nations, and begin the eight-year-long Iran–Iraq War.
- Died: Merrill Denison, 81, Canadian playwright and author

== June 14, 1975 (Saturday) ==
- The Venera 10 space probe was launched by the Soviet Union to explore the planet Venus. It would land on Venus on October 25 at 13:42 Venus solar time (0102 UTC) and transmit data for 65 minutes.
- British commercial diver George Turner drowned after experiencing nitrogen narcosis and slipping his lifeline while conducting a surface-orientated SCUBA dive from the construction/pipe laying barge Choctaw I in the North Sea.
- Died: Pablo Antonio, 74, Filipino modernist architect

== June 15, 1975 (Sunday) ==
- Didier Ratsiraka, one of 19 members of the National Military Directorate that had ruled the African island of Madagascar since February, was named as President of Madagascar by the Supreme Revolutionary Council.
- Wallace D. Muhammad, who had recently become leader of the American Nation of Islam organization (known popularly as the Black Muslims), told NOI members at a convention in Chicago that the group would accept white people into its membership. Rejecting the teachings of his father, Elijah Muhammad, that all white people were "devils", the new NOI leader said that "from now on, whites will be considered fully human."
- Retired Brazilian soccer football star Pelé made his American debut, appearing in a game in New York that was televised live in the U.S. and in ten other nations. Pelé scored a goal for the New York Cosmos in a 2–2 tie against the visiting Dallas Tornado.

== June 16, 1975 (Monday) ==
- The Great Barrier Reef Marine Park was created in Australia which put the Great Barrier Reef under government protection.
- Japan's Prime Minister Takeo Miki was punched in the face while attending funeral services for former Japanese Prime Minister Eisaku Satō. Hiroyoshi Fudeyasu, a 34-year-old member of the Great Japan Nationalist Party, struck Miki, who then went on to deliver a eulogy for Sato.
- Died: Don Robey, 71, American record producer

== June 17, 1975 (Tuesday) ==
- Voters in the Northern Mariana Islands approved an agreement to become a commonwealth within the United States. Congress would approve the new status on July 21, and the Commonwealth would come into existence on January 9, 1978, with the Northern Marianans becoming United States citizens.
- The most powerful sandstorm in the United States in several decades began in the Southern California desert and continued for two days. Driven by winds of up to 80 miles hour, the desert sands peeled paint off of thousands of cars, sent sand into homes, and created "darkness at noon" in an area between Palm Springs and Indio, California.

== June 18, 1975 (Wednesday) ==
- Faisal bin Musaid, the 31 year assassin of his uncle, King Faisal of Saudi Arabia, was publicly beheaded at Dira Square in Riyadh. As a crowd of thousands watched, a court official read a verdict declaring him guilty of murder, then directed him to kneel and then forced him to raise his head. Reportedly, "the executioner, a black Saudi in a yellow Galabiya robe", used a gold-handled sword to carry out the execution in one blow, after which "the assassin's head was hoisted briefly on a wooden stake and displayed to the applauding crowd".
- The United States Air Force launched a new generation of spy satellite that would be in a stationary orbit over either the Soviet Union or China.
- British Secretary of State for Energy Anthony Wedgwood Benn turned a valve bringing the first North Sea oil, delivered from Scotland, to a refinery in England.
- The NBC Radio Network launched the NBC News and Information Service (NIS), and 24-hour all-news network over 33 of its stations. The unprofitable experiment would be ended on May 29, 1977.
- Died: Hugo Bergmann, 91, German-born Israeli Jewish philosopher

== June 19, 1975 (Thursday) ==
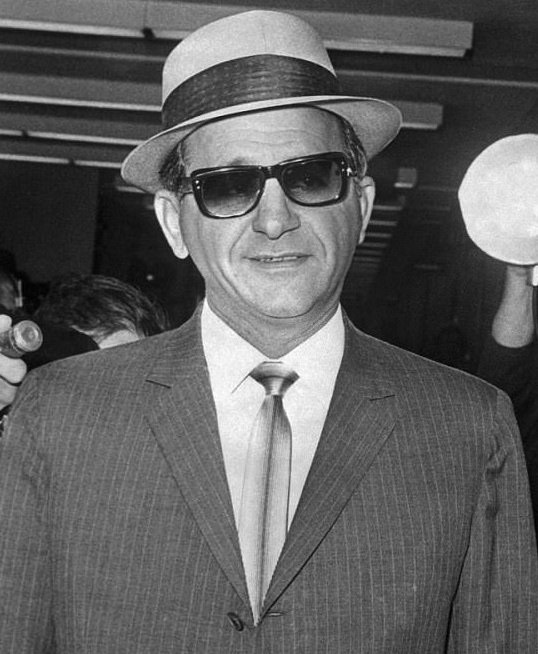
Giancana

- Five days before he was scheduled to testify before the U.S. Congress on organized crime, Sam Giancana, a former boss of Chicago mafia, was shot and killed while in the basement of his home in Oak Park, Illinois. The Chicago Police Department had had his home under surveillance that evening, but the two police drove away at 10:10 pm. At 10:30, the police heard a "popping noise" while listening, but didn't believe it was gunshots. Giancana was found the next day, shot in the mouth and the neck, despite having been in a room with an armored door. The murderer, whom Giancana apparently knew well enough to open the door for, shot Giancana in the back of the head, then in the mouth and five more times under Giancana's chin; leaving seven bullet wounds was considered a warning sign left by the Mafia for those persons who were felt to have betrayed the organization.
- Constantine Tsatsos was approved by the Parliament of the new Republic of Greece to become the nation's first elected president.
- The International Convention on Civil Liability for Oil Pollution Damage, often referred to as the CLC, came into effect by its terms, six years after its 1969 signing. The CLC provides that the sole liability for pollution damage, caused by an oil spill, lies with the owner of the ship, unless the shipowner can prove one of the exceptions (such as a spill caused by an act of war).
- Died: Henry Nelson Wieman, 90, American Christian philosopher and theologian

== June 20, 1975 (Friday) ==
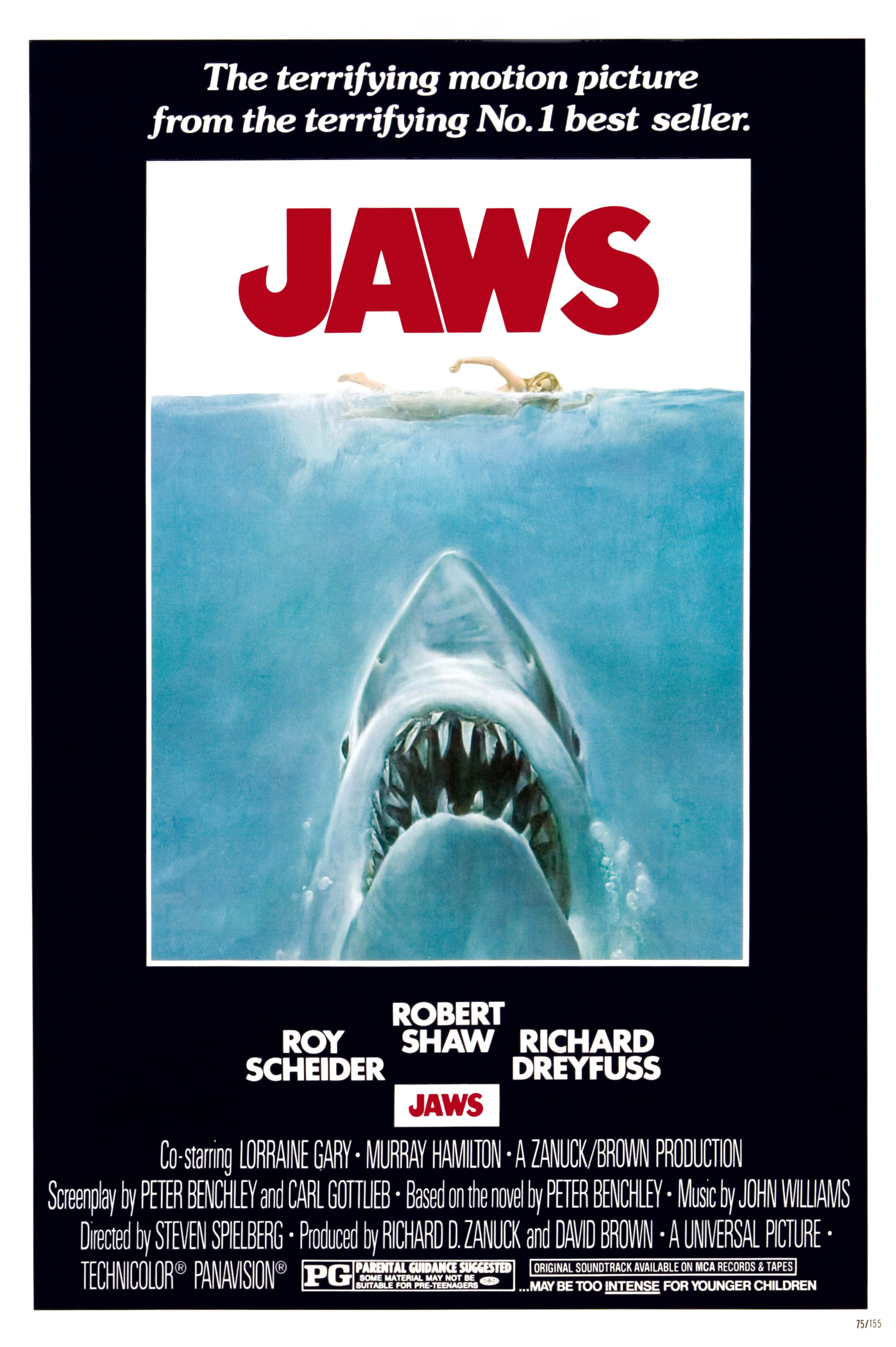
The most popular film in the U.S. in 1975

- Jaws, an action film about a white shark terrorizing a resort island, premiered nationwide. Within two weeks, the film would recoup its costs, and by September 5, it would surpass The Godfather as the highest-grossing film in history (until surpassed by Star Wars in 1977).
- Underwater photographs, purporting to be of the Loch Ness Monster, were taken by an automatic high-speed camera triggered by a sonar. Some of the photos were the result of a project by Robert H. Rines, Charles Wyckoff, and the Academy of Applied Science. The existence of the photos would be announced later in the year and the journal Nature would purchase and publish the photos in December.
- Jorge Born, the son of the Argentine multinational corporation Bunge y Born, was released unharmed after the company paid a then-record $64,000,000 to the Montoneros, the terrorist organization that had kidnapped him and his brother on September 19, 1974. Juan had been released in April "for health reasons". The Montoneros group would be wiped out by the Argentine government by 1977 in the Dirty War.
- Former California Governor Ronald Reagan filed papers with the Federal Election Commission, declaring his intention to run for President of the United States in a challenge against incumbent Gerald Ford for the Republican Party nomination. Reagan would lose to Ford at the 1976 convention, but would win the party's nomination, and the presidency, in 1980.
- Died: Michel Aikpé, Interior Minister of Dahomey (now Benin), was shot and killed at his home by the bodyguard of Dahomey's president, Mathieu Kerekou. President Kerekou had been outraged after finding Minister Aikpe in bed with Mrs. Kerekou. A new Interior Minister was appointed on Monday.

== June 21, 1975 (Saturday) ==
- The first McDonald's drive-through restaurant service was inaugurated in Sierra Vista, Arizona, making it possible for customers from nearby Fort Huachuca, a military installation, to place their orders at a microphone, then to drive up to a window from which their food would be handed to them, without need for anyone to leave the vehicle. The innovation was made, in part, because members of the U.S. military were not permitted to get out of their vehicles, off-post, while wearing fatigues. Because of the increase in sales from the experiment, the drive-through went on to become a feature of most fast food restaurants in the world.
- The West Indies cricket team defeated Australia, 291 to 274, to win the first-ever Cricket World Cup, in a one day international (ODI) match played at Lord's Cricket Ground at London, to win the tournament that had started on June 7 with eight teams. The West Indies team had five players from Guyana, three from Barbados, and two apiece from Barbados, Jamaica, the Leeward Islands and Trinidad & Tobago.

== June 22, 1975 (Sunday) ==
- Uganda's dictator, Idi Amin, postponed the execution of British citizen Denis Hills, a day before Hills was set to go before a firing squad for statements made in the unpublished manuscript of The White Pumpkin. Amin's decision came after he hosted two British envoys at his hometown of Arua. The envoys, bearing a written appeal from Queen Elizabeth II, had been Amin's commanding officers when Amin had been a sergeant in the King's African Rifles in the colonial British Army. Hills would be released by Amin on July 10. Reports indicate the envoys met Amin "on their knees".

== June 23, 1975 (Monday) ==
- The United States Supreme Court voted, 8–0, to accept the resignation of former U.S. President Richard M. Nixon from practice before the court.
- The events of George Perec's 1978 novel Life: A User's Manual (La Vie mode d'emploi), as Peret describes each character's fate on that date at an apartment building at 11 Rue Simon-Crubellier in Paris, shortly before 8:00 pm.

== June 24, 1975 (Tuesday) ==
- Eastern Air Lines Flight 66 from New Orleans crashed while attempting to land at the JFK Airport in New York during a thunderstorm, killing 113 of the 124 people on board. The Boeing 727 was running 25 minutes late as it made its approach at 4:08 pm into a thunderstorm, then crashed a half-mile short of the runway, near Rockaway Boulevard and Brookville Boulevard in the Rosedale neighborhood of Queens. To the horror of rescuers, scores of residents of Rosedale descended on the scene to loot jewelry, money and other valuables from the scattered luggage, and even from the victims' bodies. Meteorologist Ted Fujita's research of the disaster led to his discovery of microbursts, sudden downdrafts of wind at high speed. A week after the crash, tape recordings from air traffic control showed that a few minutes before the tower cleared Flight 66 to land on Runway 22L, the pilot of an air freighter, that had just landed on the same runway, radioed that "I just highly recommend that you change runways and land northwest. You have such a tremendous wind shear near the ground on the final."
- India's Prime Minister Indira Gandhi was allowed to keep her office pending a review of her corruption conviction by that nation's Supreme Court.
- The claim of Don Juan de Borbón, the Count of Barcelona, to become King of Spain upon the death of President Francisco Franco, was formally rejected by Prime Minister Carlos Arias Navarro, who told Parliament that Don Juan's son, Juan Carlos de Borbón, would be Franco's successor. Don Juan, the former Crown Prince of Spain, had been pretender to the throne since the 1941 death of his father, former King Alfonso XIII, had declared from exile in Portugal that he would be more qualified to guide Spain to democracy.
- Died:
  - Elizabeth Lee Hazen, 89, American microbiologist
  - Wendell Ladner, 26, American professional basketball player, was killed in the crash of Eastern Flight 66.

== June 25, 1975 (Wednesday) ==
- The People's Republic of Mozambique, formerly the colony of Portuguese East Africa, gained independence from Portugal shortly after midnight, with Samora Machel of the FRELIMO Party as its first President. Within two years, the civil war would be renewed in Mozambique as a new group, the Mozambican National Resistance (RENAMO), supported by South Africa would begin a 15-year-long war against Machel's Soviet supported government. Machel would die in a plane crash in 1986. The Marxist republic would give way to a democratic regime in 1990.
- India's President Fakhruddin Ali Ahmed signed the proclamation to declare a state of emergency. The order was implemented the next day.
- Born:
  - Vladimir Kramnik, Russian chess player and World Champion from 2000 to 2007; in Tuapse, Russian SFSR, Soviet Union
  - Linda Cardellini, American TV actress known for starring in Freaks and Geeks and Bloodline; in Redwood City, California

== June 26, 1975 (Thursday) ==
- In response to calls for the resignation of Prime Minister Indira Gandhi, the national government arrested 676 of her political opponents, including Jayaprakash Narayan, who had called for a civil disobedience protest. The day before, India's President Fakhruddin Ali Ahmed, on Gandhi's advice, had signed a proclamation for a state of emergency, suspending civil liberties and elections. Civil rights would remain suspended in "The World's Largest Democracy" until January 18, 1977, when new elections would be permitted to take place. Officially, 36,039 people would be arrested and detained during the next 18 months, mostly in the states of Uttar Pradesh, Madhya Pradesh and Maharashtra. After being voted out of office and ending "The Emergency", Gandhi would admit in 1977 that she had made the decision without consulting with her cabinet of ministers.
- Two FBI agents, Ronald A. Williams and Jack R. Coler, and one American Indian Movement (AIM) member, Joe Stuntz, were killed in a shootout at the Pine Ridge Indian Reservation in South Dakota.
- Died: Josemaría Escrivá, 73, Spanish priest and founder of Opus Dei; canonized 2002

== June 27, 1975 (Friday) ==
- International terrorist Ilich Ramírez Sánchez, more commonly known as "Carlos the Jackal", eluded capture after three policemen of the French Intelligence Service arrived at his Paris apartment to question him about a recent terrorist attack at the Orly Airport. After getting permission to use the bathroom, Carlos came back out firing a gun and killed two of the officers, Raymond Dous and Jean Donatini, along with Michel Moukharbal, the informer who had betrayed him, then escaped; the third officer, Jean Herranz, survived. Carlos would finally be captured in 1994.
- Professional golfers Lee Trevino and Jerry Heard were struck by lightning when a thunderstorm interrupted the Western Open PGA Tournament. Trevino, who was hospitalized for burns on his left shoulder, remained in pain for two years before winning the Canadian Open in 1977.
- Born: Tobey Maguire, American film actor, in Santa Monica, California
- Died:
  - Geoffrey Ingram Taylor, 89, British physicist
  - Robert Stolz, 94, Austrian composer of operettas and film music, conductor and songwriter

== June 28, 1975 (Saturday) ==
- The Anglo-Australian Telescope, at 153 inches the 3rd largest optical telescope in the world (after the Mount Palomar and Kitt Peak telescopes in the United States), and the largest in the Southern Hemisphere went into operation.
- Died:
  - Rod Serling, 50, American television screenwriter best known as host of The Twilight Zone
  - Jesse Langdon, 94, last surviving member of the "Rough Riders" of the Spanish–American War

== June 29, 1975 (Sunday) ==
- The ship Greenpeace V, operated by the environmentalist Canadian group Greenpeace Foundation, made the first of many confrontations with whalers to save the world's whales from being hunted to extinction. Paul Watson and several other members of the crew conducted the first "hunt sabotage" against the Soviet whaling ship Dalniy Vostok, steering rafts between the ships and the whales in an effort to prevent the firing of harpoons. In that first meeting, the Soviets fired their harpoons anyway, without injury to the Greenpeace members.
- On the night of June 29–30, 20-year-old Donald Watt Cressey of Bellevue, Washington, the senior cook at Old Faithful Lodge in Yellowstone National Park, attended a "hot potting" (hot-spring swimming) party on Nez Perce Creek along with 10 to 20 other people. Cressey died after somehow entering a 179 °F (82 °C)-hot spring fully clothed. Because the rest of the group drove home without noticing Cressey's absence, park rangers would suspect foul play, and the FBI would investigate.
- After facing massive crowds and a traffic jam getting to the race, A.J. Foyt had to helicopter in to the track garage, then later became the first driver to win the Pocono 500 twice, with a rain-shortened victory. He led 115 of the 170 laps.
- Died:
  - Tim Buckley, 28, American singer/songwriter, of a drug overdose
  - Richard Loving, 41, white American who, along with his African-American wife Mildred, filed Loving v. Virginia, ending bans on interracial marriage; after his car was struck by a drunken driver.

== June 30, 1975 (Monday) ==
- Women could no longer be involuntarily discharged from the United States Armed Forces as a result of pregnancy, by orders of the U.S. Secretary of Defense.
- Paul Biya became the first Prime Minister of Cameroon
- A 6.4 magnitude earthquake struck the Yellowstone National Park in Wyoming.
- TV2 (now TVNZ 2) began broadcasting in New Zealand.
