= 60th anniversary of the Armenian genocide commemorations in Beirut =

On May 6, 1975, a massive gathering took place in the Lebanese capital Beirut, to commemorate the 60th anniversary of the Armenian genocide. Some 100,000 people participated in the march, which was organized jointly by different groups across the Armenian political spectrum.

== Preparations ==
From the 50th anniversary commemoration of the Armenian genocide in 1965 onwards, Armenians held assemblies in the streets of Beirut on Commemoration Day (April 24). Previously these events had been held in stadiums.

The Armenian political parties in Lebanon decided on September 2, 1974, to commemorate the 60th anniversary of the Armenian genocide together. Apart from the Lebanon branches of the Armenian political parties, the Armenian communists (members of the Lebanese Communist Party) also took part in the preparations. A Beirut-based International United Committee was formed by the Armenian Revolutionary Federation (Tashnaqs), the Social Democrat Hunchakian Party and the Armenian Democratic Liberal Party (Ramgavar) to organize commemorations worldwide. However, in April 1975 the Lebanese Civil War broke out.

== Bourj Hammoud meeting ==
Taking advantage of a temporary cease-fire, the march was held on May 6, 1975. Around 50,000 people gathered at Bourj Hammoud Athletic Field. Speakers included Rashid as-Solh (prime minister of Lebanon), Khatchig Babikian (Armenian member of the Lebanese parliament), Nubar Tursarkisian, Shavarsh Torigian (Tashnag party representative), Vahrij Jerejian (Hunchakian party representative) and Onnig Sarkisian (Ramgavar party representative). Kataeb Party leader Pierre Gemayel took part in the meeting as a special invitee.

== March ==
At the end of the meeting in Bourj Hammoud, the assembled started marching towards Martyrs' Square in downtown Beirut. The crowd numbered some 100,000. According to press accounts, the march proceeded without any incidents. Amongst the participants in the event were prominent Armenians from abroad, such as the businessman Kirk Kerkorian. At Martyrs' Square the march was greeted by Emin Beyhoum, mayor of Beirut. Beyhoum declared that a street had been renamed 'Rue de l'Armenie'. At the Martyrs' Monument the executive of the International United Committee placed a large wreath.

== Hamra protest ==
Some 2,000 Armenian students carried out protests in the Hamra neighbourhood of West Beirut. They conducted sit-ins at two Turkish centres.
