= Animal-made art =

Art created by non-human animals

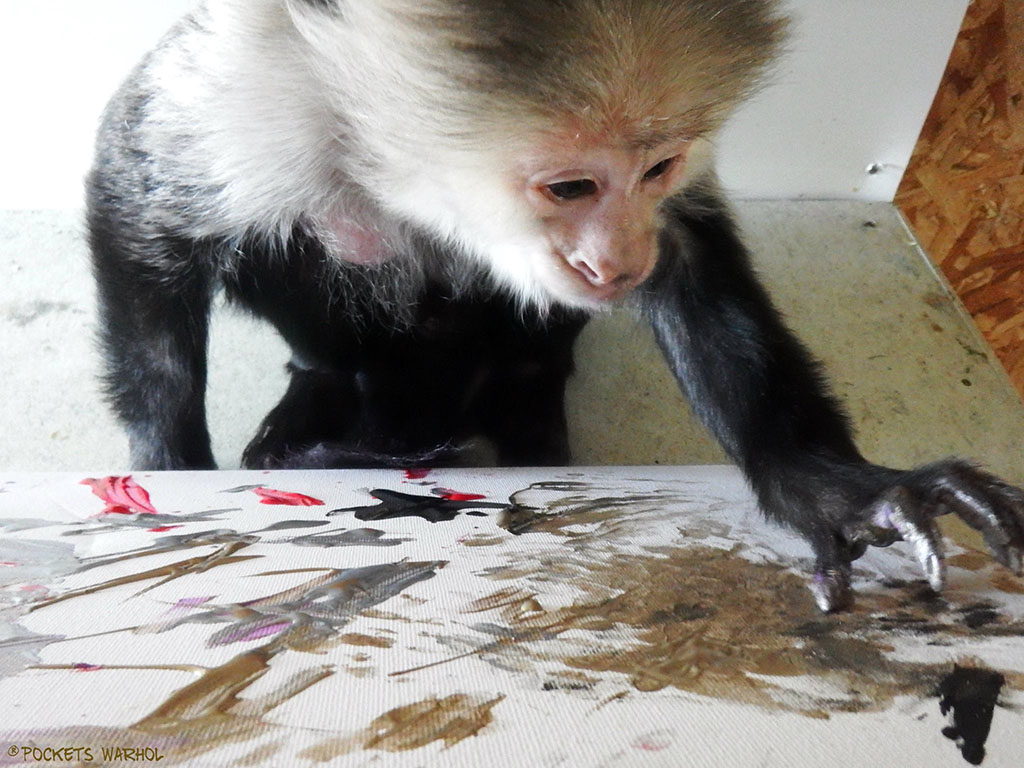
Capuchin monkey Pockets Warhol creating an artwork

Animal-made art consists of works by non-human animals, that have been considered by humans to be artistic, including visual works, music, photography, and videography. Some of these are created naturally by animals, often as courtship displays, while others are created with human involvement.

There have been debates about the copyright status of these works, with the United States Copyright Office stating in 2014 that works that lack human authorship cannot have their copyright registered at the US Copyright Office.

== Painting ==
=== Donkey ===
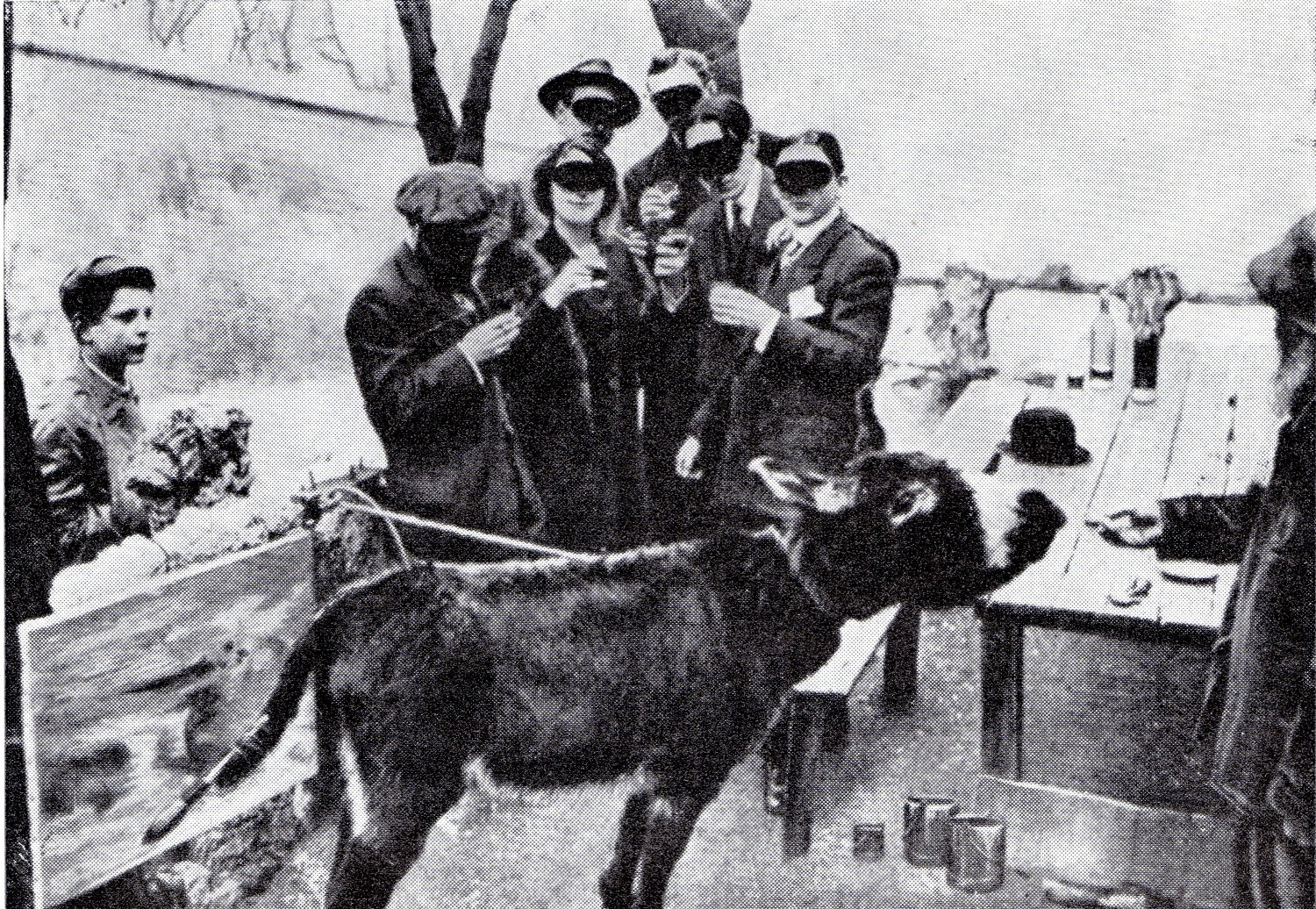
Lolo the donkey ("Joachim-Raphaël Boronali") painting in front of witnesses

A painting partially made by Lolo the donkey, Et le soleil s'endormit sur l'Adriatique (Sunset Over the Adriatic) was exhibited at the 1910 Salon des Indépendants attributed to the 'excessivist' Genoan painter Joachim-Raphaël Boronali, an invention of writer and critic Roland Dorgelès, who painted much of the painting. It sold for 400 francs and was donated by Dorgelès to the Orphelinat des Arts. The painting forms part of the permanent collection at l'Espace culturel Paul Bédu (Milly-la-Forêt).

=== Primates ===
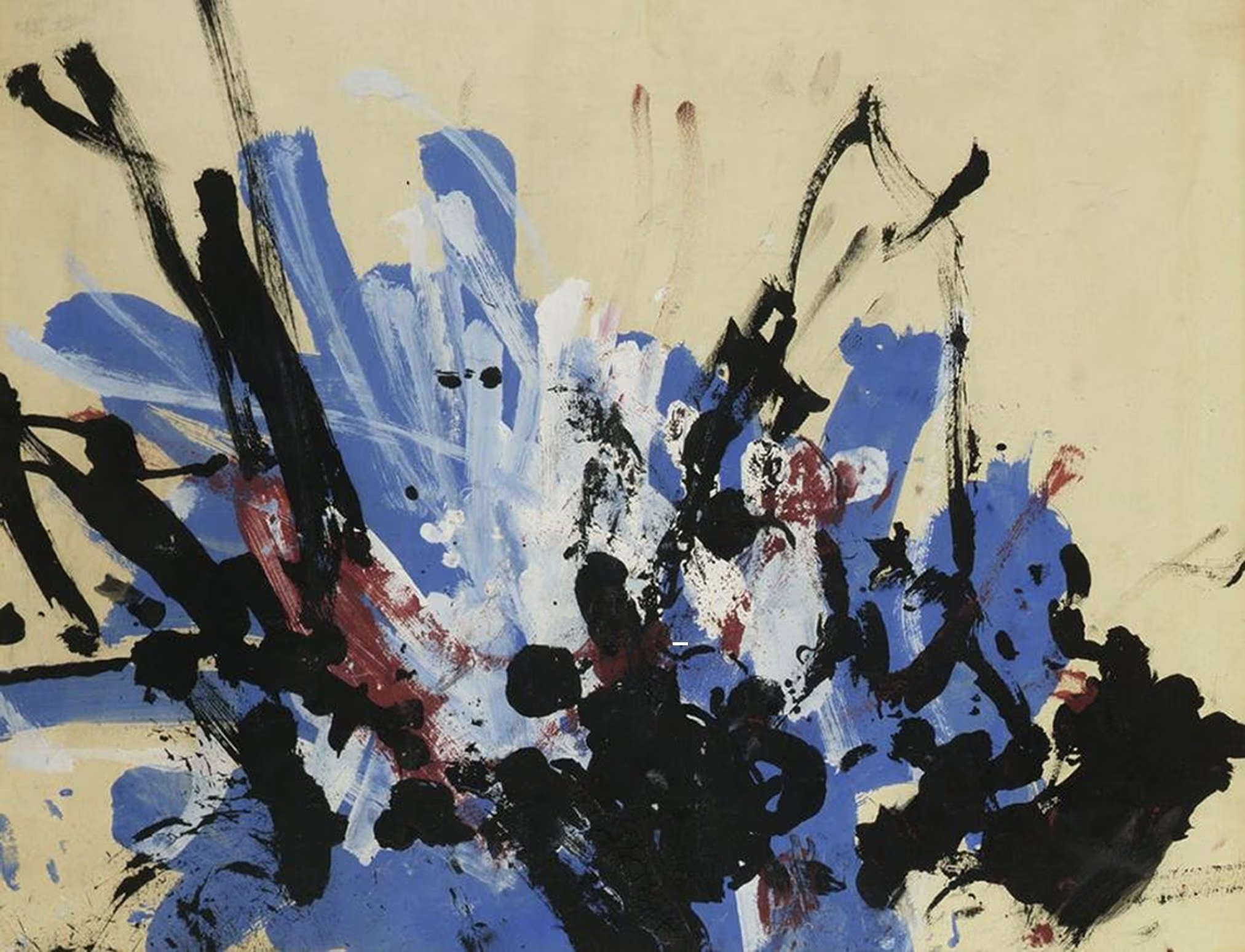
Painting by Congo the chimpanzee

During the late 1950s biologists began to study the nature of art in humans. Theories were proposed based on observations of non-human primate paintings. Hundreds of such paintings were cataloged by Desmond Morris. Morris and his associate Tyler Harris interpreted these canvas paintings as indications of an intrinsic motivation toward abstract creativity, as expressed through an exploration of the visual field and color. Many of these painters progressed over time by expanding or contracting the area of paint coverage, the horizontal or vertical stroke relationships, and even the development of content. Such paintings were exhibited in many modern art museums during the late 1950s and early 1960s. The cultural and scientific interest in these paintings diminished steadily and little note is taken today.

The most successful chimpanzee artist is Congo (1954–1964). Morris offered him a pencil and paper at two years of age, and by the age of four, Congo had made 400 drawings and paintings. His style has been described as "lyrical abstract impressionism". Media reaction to Congo's painting abilities were mixed, although relatively positive and accepted with interest. Pablo Picasso was reportedly a "fan" of his paintings, and hung one in his studio after receiving it as a gift. In 2005 Congo's paintings were included in an auction at Bonhams alongside works by Renoir and Warhol. They sold for more than expected, while Renoir's and Warhol's did not sell. American collector Howard Hong purchased three of Congo's works for over US$25,000.

A more recent example is Pockets Warhol, a capuchin monkey from the Story Book Farm Primate sanctuary, who started painting in 2011 and died in 2026.

=== Elephants ===
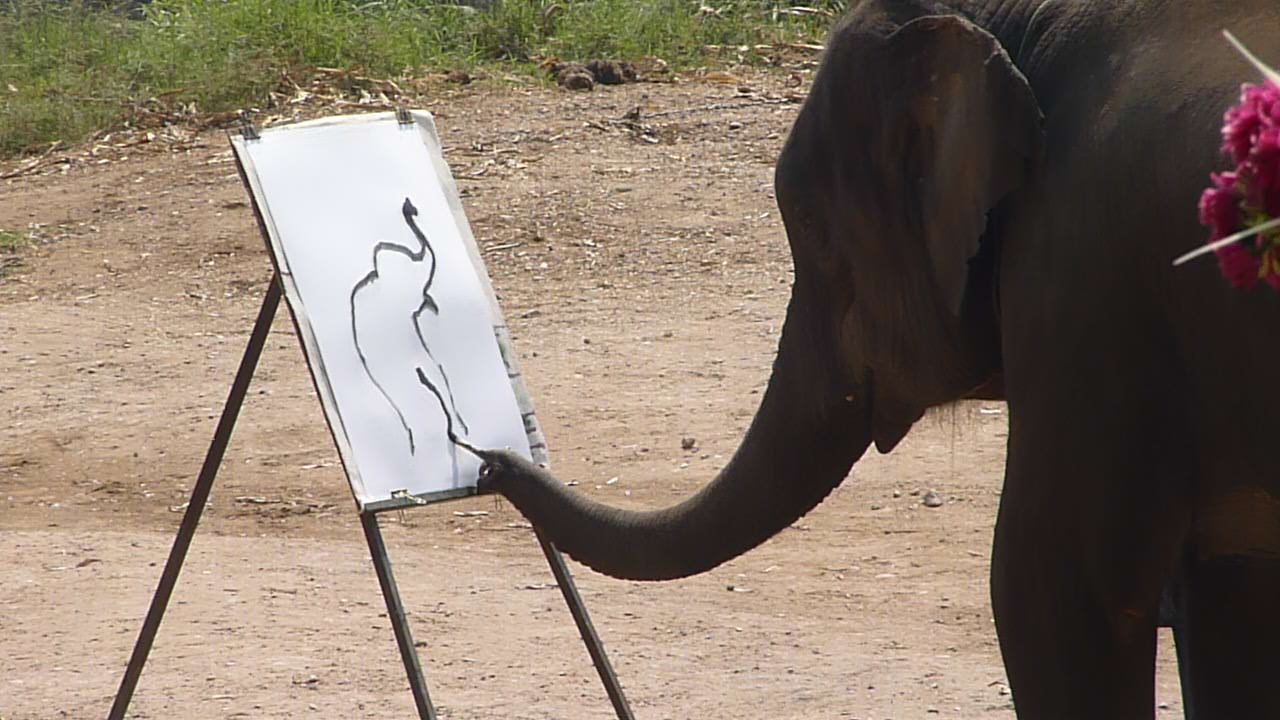
A trained elephant painting in Chiang Mai

Elephants in captivity have been trained to paint as a form of zoo environmental and behavioral enrichment. This includes Ruby the elephant, who lived most of her life at the Phoenix Zoo and produced abstract paintings.

Another example of this is seen at Melbourne Zoo. However, research published in 2014 indicated that elephants gain little enrichment from the activity of painting apart from the positive reinforcement given by zookeepers during the activity. The scientists concluded that the "benefits of this activity appear to be limited to the aesthetic appeal of these paintings to the people viewing them". The elephants draw the same painting each time and have learned to draw it line-for-line.

In Thailand, several elephant centers exhibit painting elephants. A zoologist who visited one such elephant show concluded that the elephants were being instructed by their trainers on the directions of their brushstrokes through tugs on their ear. It has been alleged that cruelty is involved in some tourist destinations where elephants are trained to paint.

=== Dolphins ===
In some dolphin shows, educated dolphins and beluga whales paint with brushes. The Institute for Marine Mammal Studies has taught several of its dolphins to paint.

=== Rabbit ===
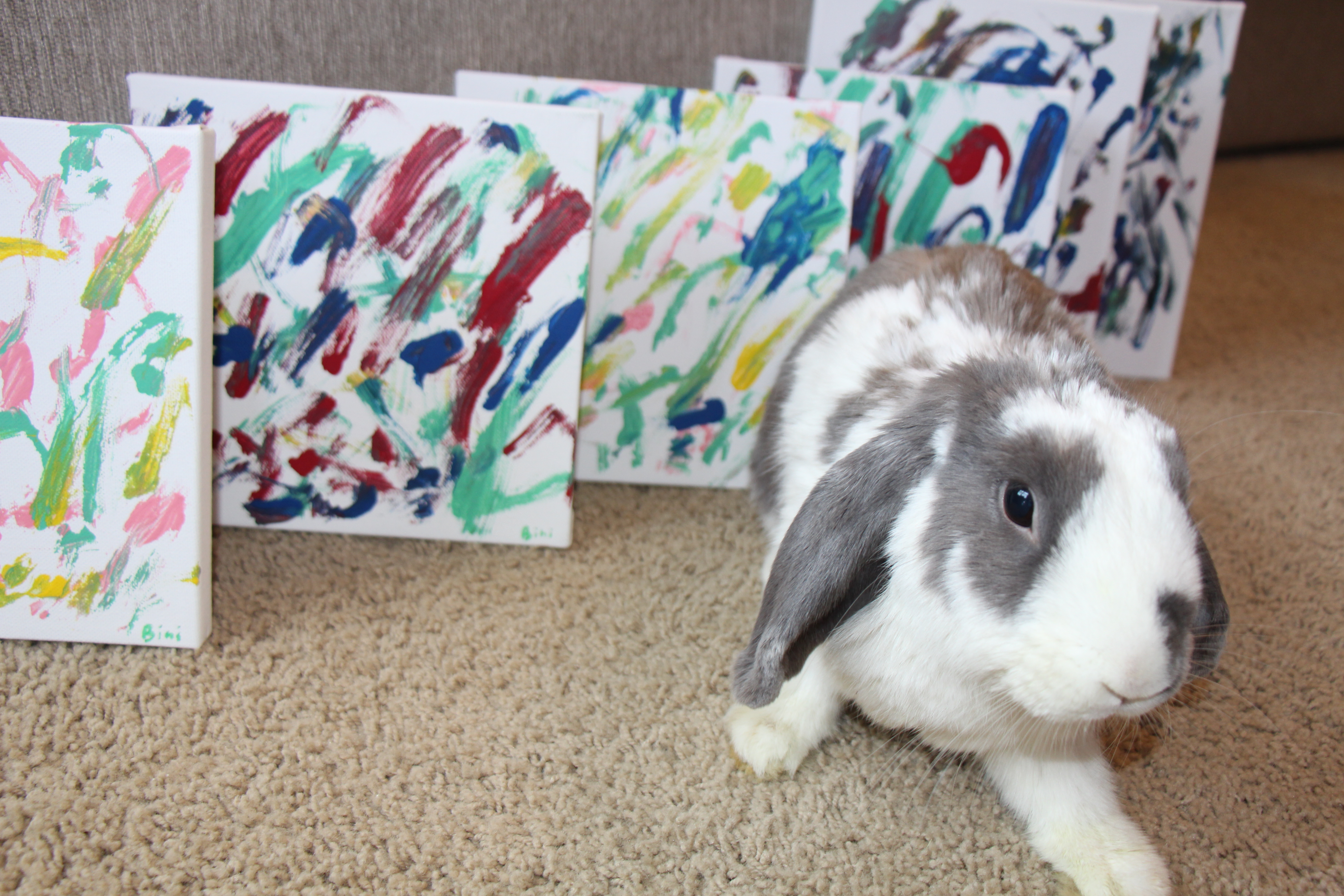
Bini in front of his artwork

Bini the Bunny (2012-2023) was a Holland lop rabbit who painted abstract art on small canvases, holding a brush in his mouth. His paintings are featured on a YouTube channel.

=== Pig ===
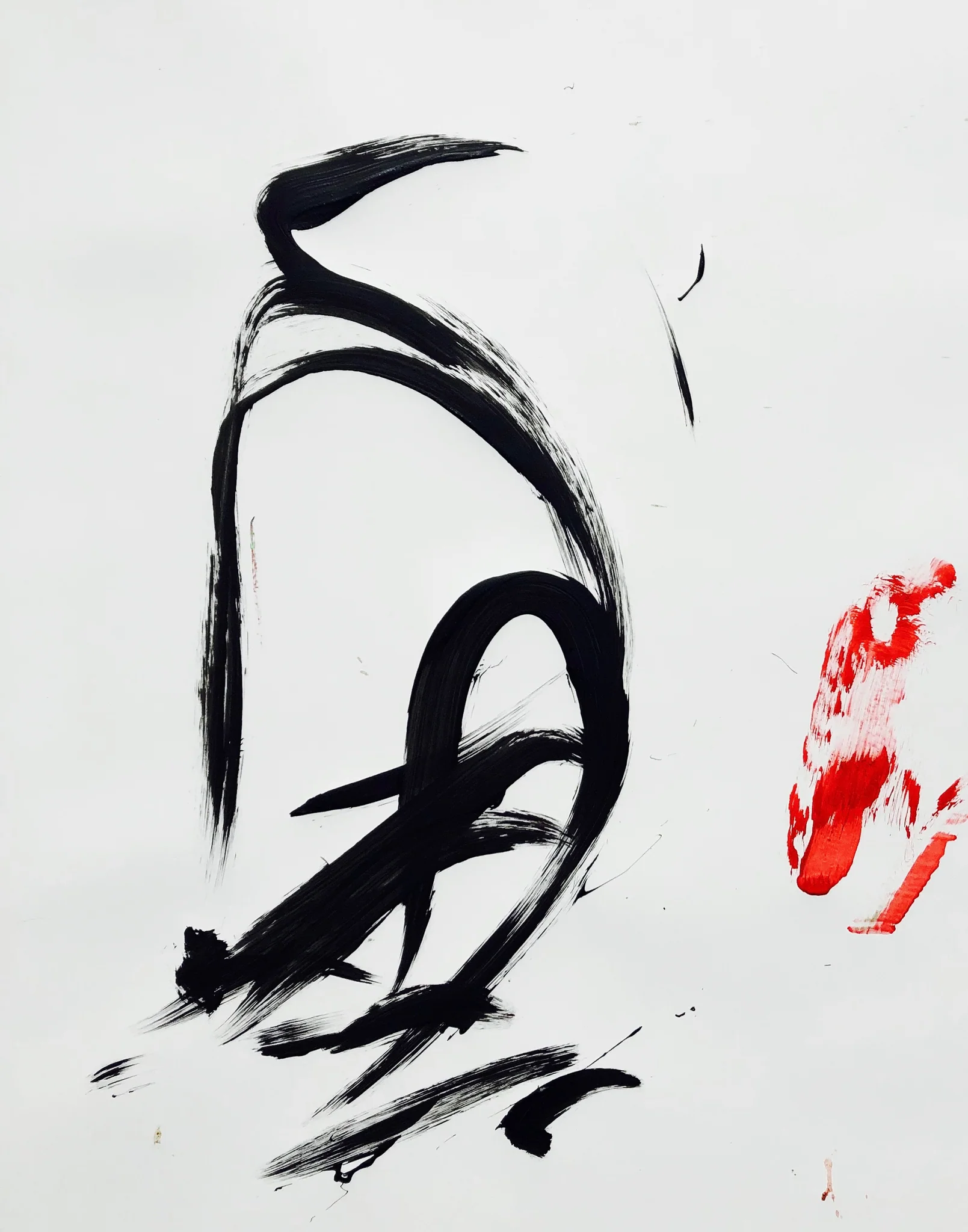
Penguin (2019), painting by Pigcasso

Pigcasso (2016–2024) was a South African pig who gained international notoriety for her abstract expressionist paintings, which have sold for thousands of dollars around the world. Pigcasso was rescued from an industrial hog farm as a piglet by her owner, Joanne Lefson, who taught her to paint using positive reinforcement techniques. Lefson used the proceeds of the sales of Pigcasso's paintings to raise funds for her farm sanctuary in Franschhoek, South Africa.

Each of Pigcasso's works was signed by means of the artist dipping her nose-tip into beetroot ink and touching it onto the canvas.

Pigcasso and Lefson are the first non-human/human collaboration to have held an art exhibition together, which took place at the Victoria & Alfred Waterfront in Cape Town in 2018. Pigcasso's most expensive work sold in December 2021 for US$27,000, making it the most expensive animal-made art piece ever to have been sold at the time.

=== Other animals ===
A spokeswoman for the United States Association of Zoos and Aquariums in 2008 said that painting animals at zoos in the US included kangaroos, ocelots, red pandas, a rhinoceros and a Komodo dragon.

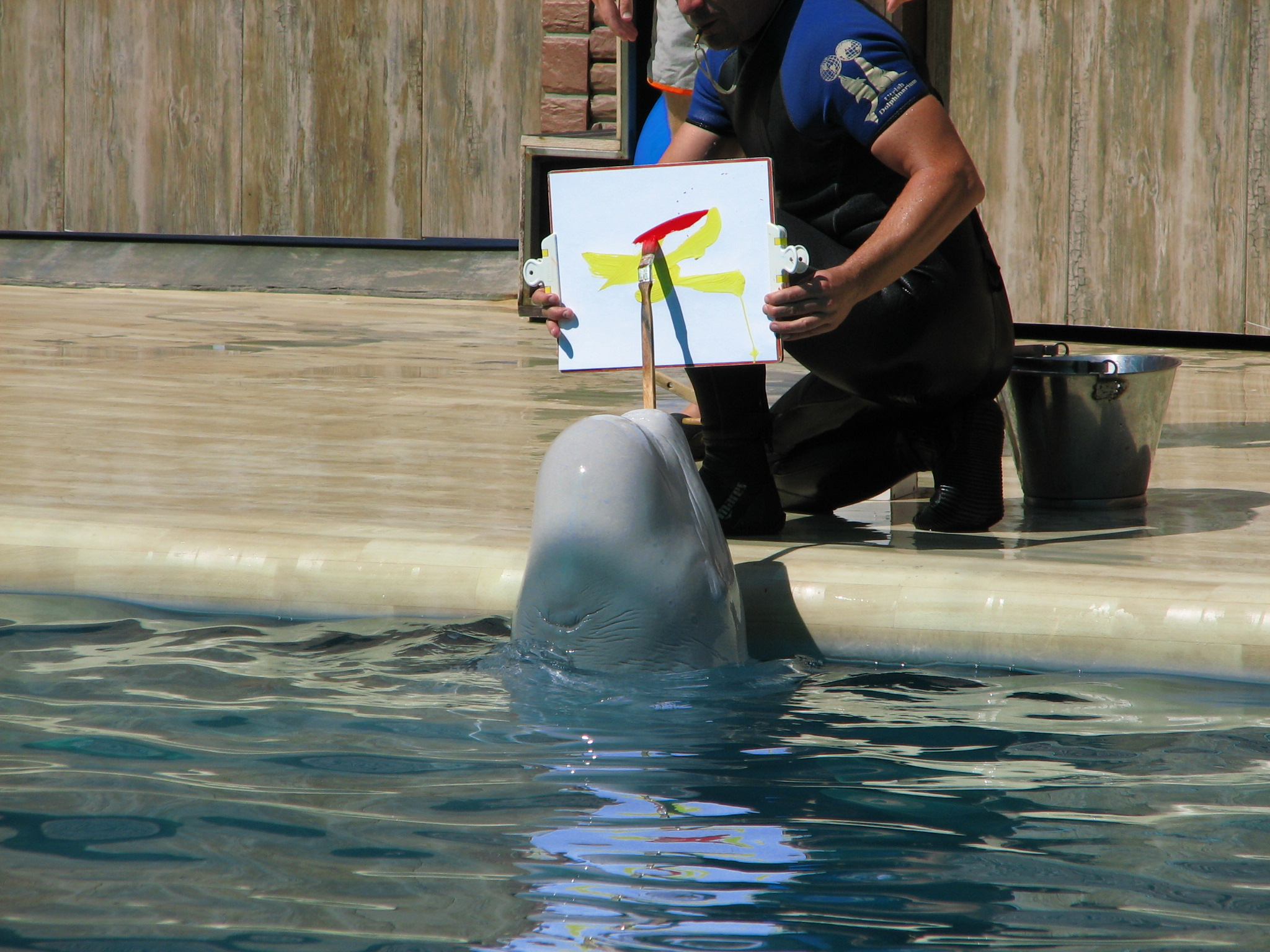
Beluga whale painting

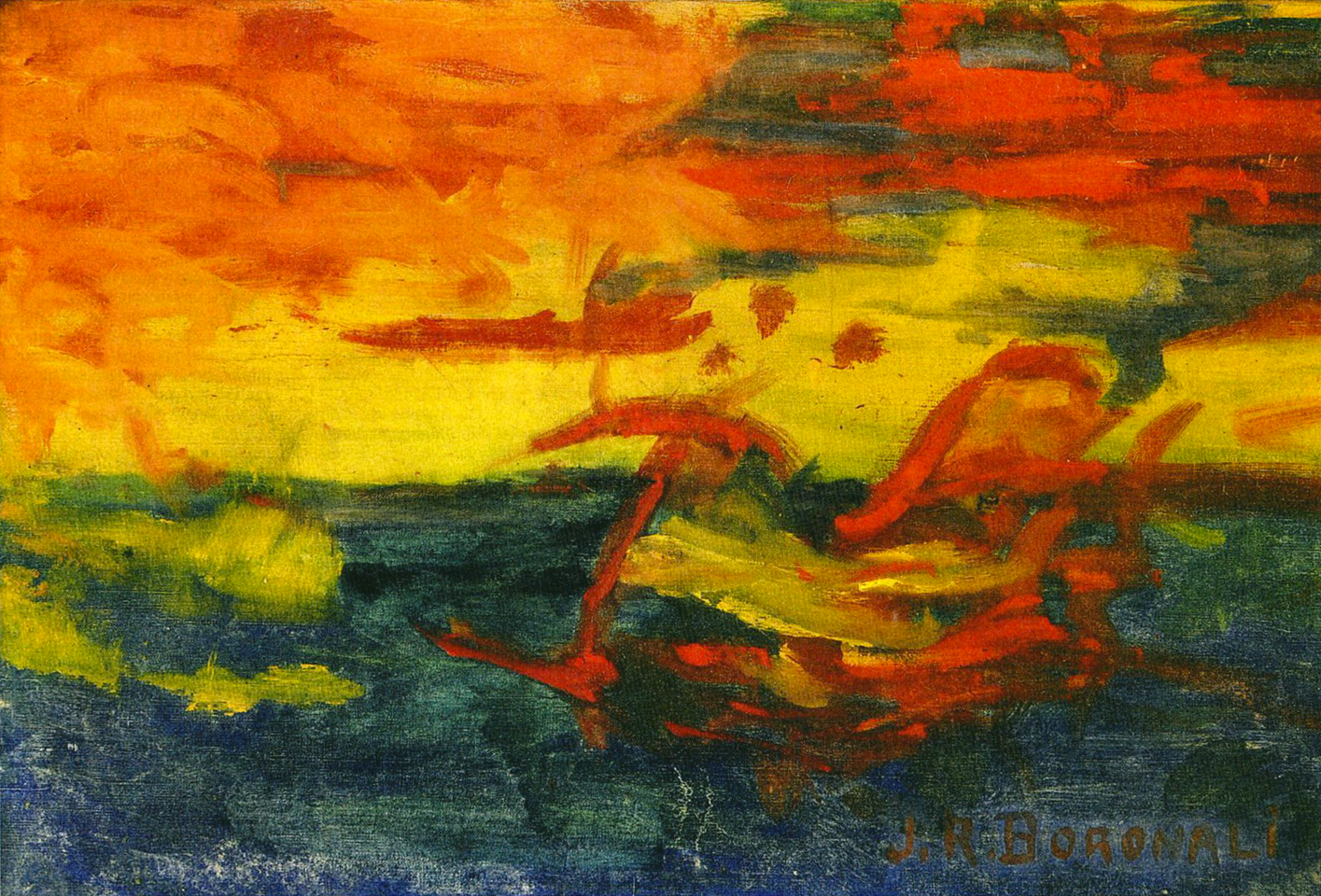
Et le soleil s'endormit sur l'Adriatique (Sunset Over the Adriatic), 54 × 81 cm, painting partially made by donkey (Lolo) assisted by Roland Dorgelès.

== Photography and videography ==
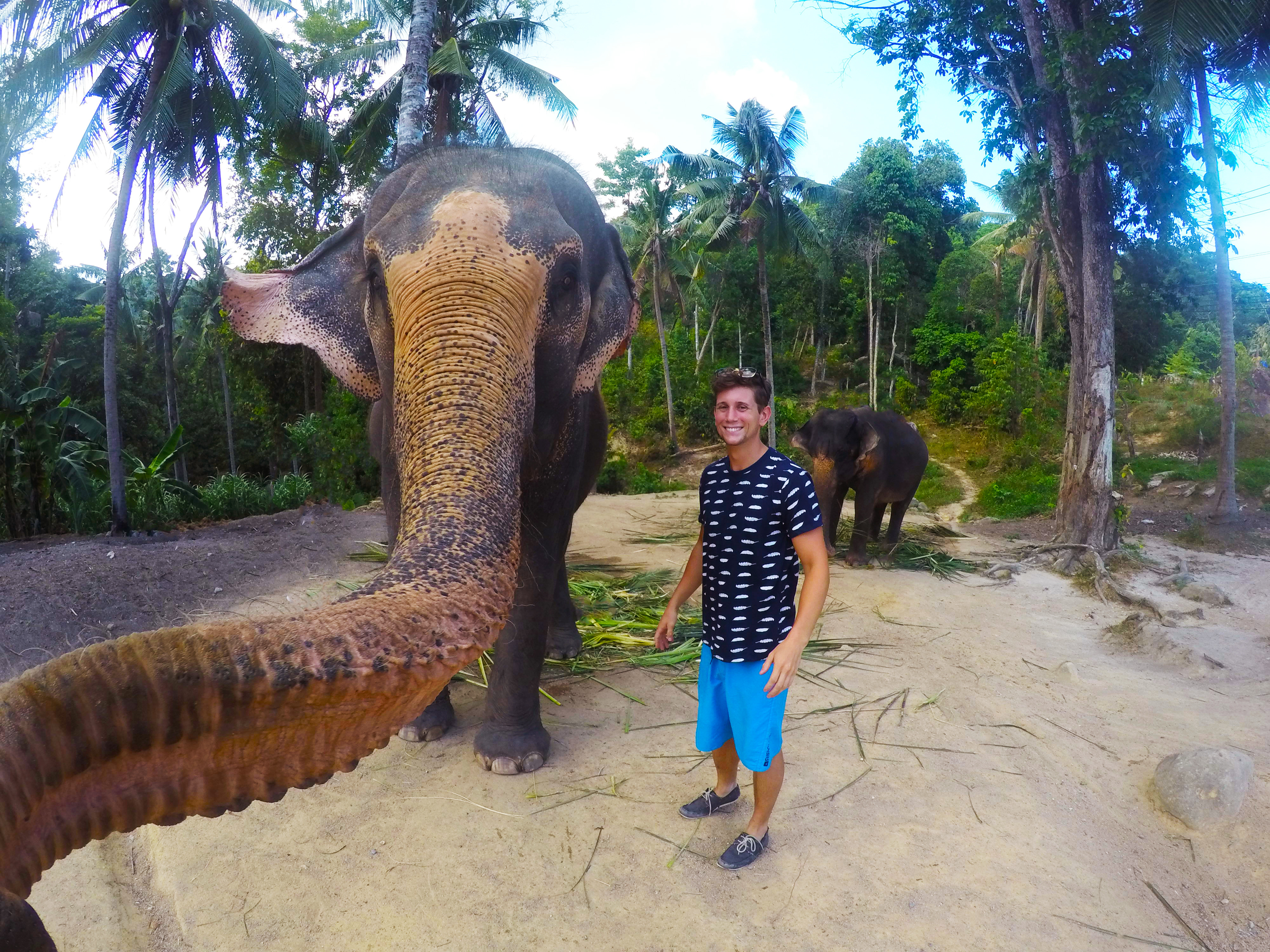
Accidental self-portrait by an elephant with a GoPro camera in Koh Phangan, Thailand

=== Crested macaques ===
In mid-2014, equipment owned by nature photographer David Slater was used by a Celebes crested macaque in Tangkoko Nature Reserve in Indonesia to take a series of self-portraits. This led to a copyright dispute known as the 'monkey selfie case'.

=== Elephants ===
An elephant at West Midland Safari Park was reported to have taken a 'selfie' using a dropped mobile phone belonging to visitor Scott Brierley in May 2014.

In 2015, an elephant in Koh Phangan, Thailand, took a running GoPro camera from traveller Christian Le Blanc and filmed some video footage.

=== Bears ===
One of the videos created by bears in 2023 using Tom Scott's lost GoPro camera

In 2023, after British YouTuber Tom Scott made a video featuring bears at the Grizzly & Wolf Discovery Center in Montana, the bears found a lost GoPro camera and accidentally turned it on, capturing two videos which were recovered by Scott when the camera was found. Scott declared that as the footage was "created entirely by bears", he believed it to be in the public domain, and uploaded it to the Internet Archive.

== Mating displays ==
Some animals create visually impressive displays as part of their mating behaviours, which have been described as artistic. These include bowers constructed by bowerbirds and geometric circles created by white-spotted pufferfish.

== Music ==
=== Elephants ===
It has been noted since ancient times that elephants seem to have an affinity for music. The Ringling Bros circus featured an "Elephant brass band" which they claimed could "play popular songs of the day in tune and in time". In the 1950s, German evolutionary biologist Bernard Rensch found that elephants can distinguish 12 tones on the musical scale and remember simple melodies, even when played on different instruments at various pitches, timbres, and meters.

The Thai Elephant Orchestra is a musical ensemble consisting of six to fourteen Thai elephants who play heavy-duty musical instruments. Three CDs of their music have been released.

=== Cat ===
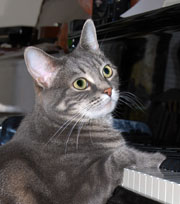
Nora the Piano Cat at the piano

Nora the Piano Cat was a tabby cat who featured in a 2007 viral YouTube video playing the piano. In 2009, recorded footage of Nora was included in CATcerto, a piece by Lithuanian composer Mindaugas Piečaitis.

== Insect ==
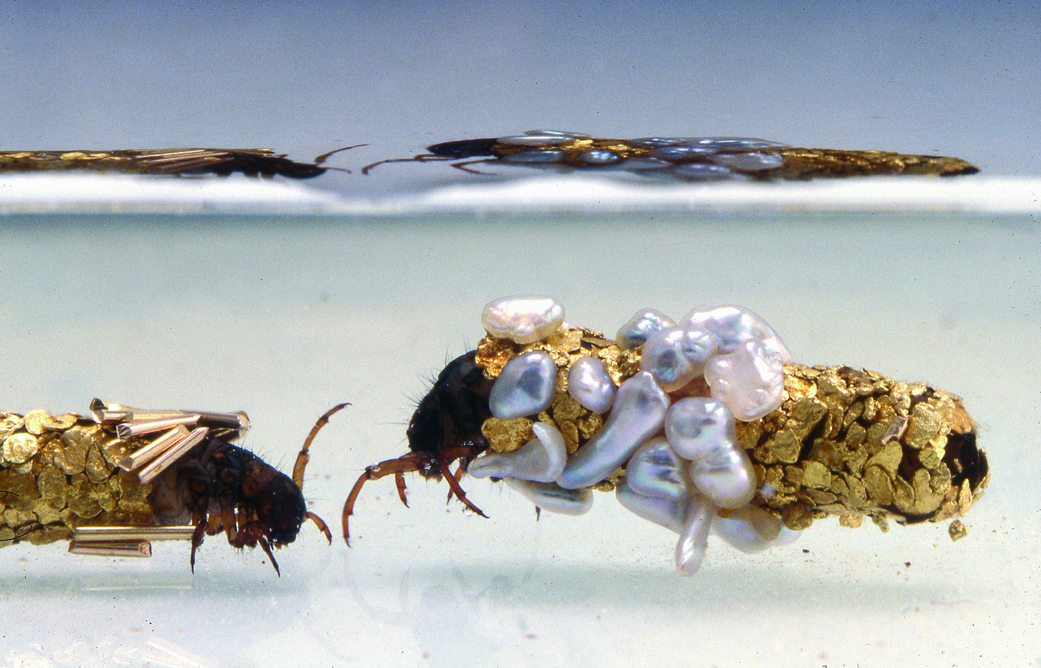
Caddisfly cocoons made of gold and pearls

French artist Hubert Duprat "collaborated" with caddisfly larvae by providing them with gold, pearls, and precious stones to construct their protective aquatic cocoons.

== Copyright issues ==
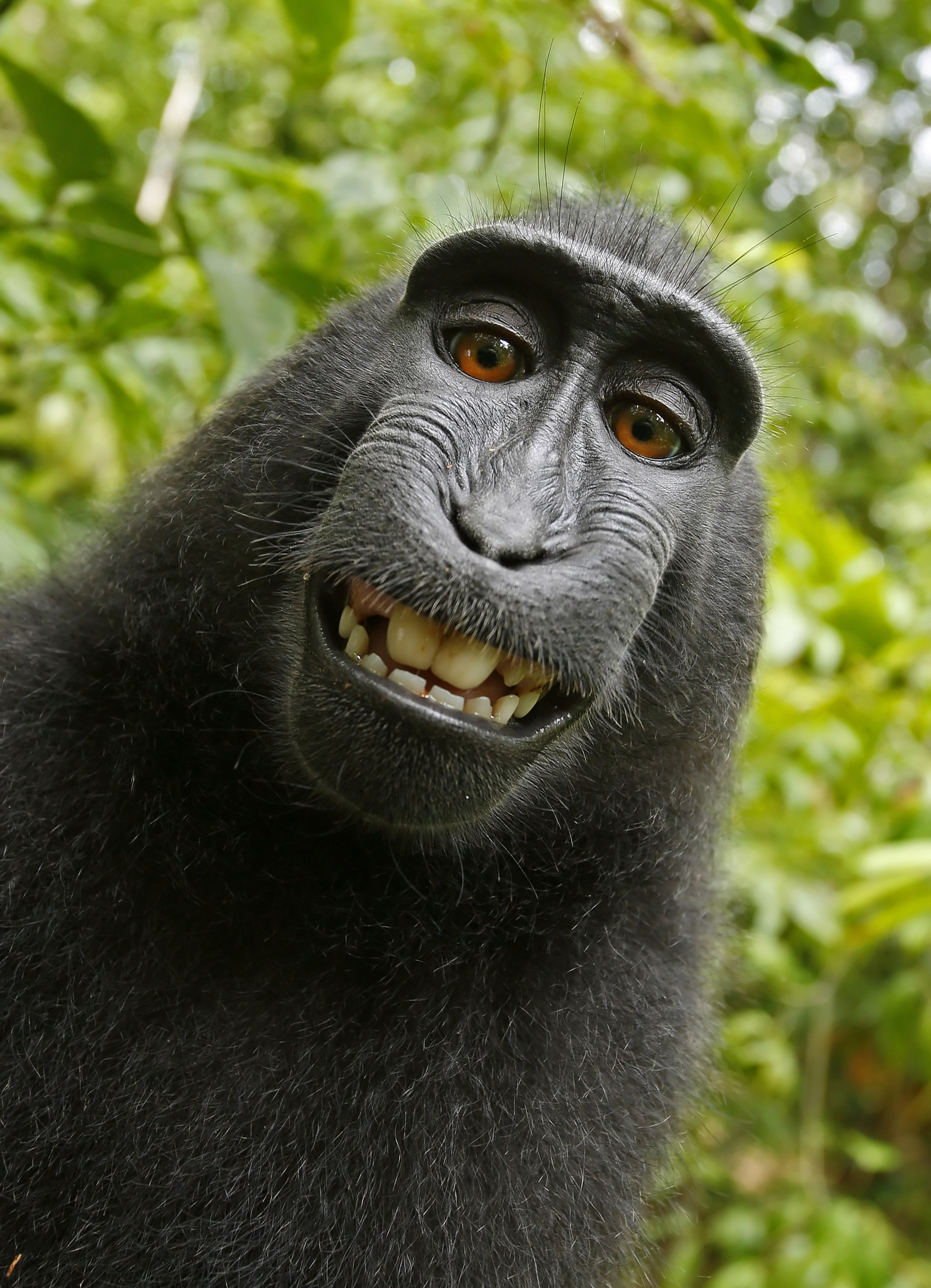
One of the self-portraits of a crested macaque involved in the Monkey selfie copyright dispute

The copyright to an artistic work is typically held by its author. In cases where the artistic work was created by an animal, intellectual property analysts Mary M. Luria and Charles Swan have argued that neither the human who provides the equipment used to create the work, nor the human who owns the animal itself (when applicable), can hold the copyright to the resulting work by the animal. In these cases, the animal's work was not an intellectual creation of the humans, and copyrights can only be held by legal persons—which an animal is not. Since no one owns the copyright to the work, it is therefore public domain and can be used by anyone without seeking permission.

The question of ownership of copyright for photographs created by animals was tested in the monkey selfie case, in mid-2014, after equipment owned by nature photographer David Slater was used by a Celebes crested macaque in Tangkoko Nature Reserve in Indonesia to take a series of self-portraits. Slater claimed copyright over the image, arguing that he had set up the situation. Other individuals and organizations, however, argued that the photographs, as the work of a non-human animal (and thus not the work of a legal person), were public domain. Slater stated that the upload of the images to Wikimedia Commons, a free media repository, had cost him more than £10,000 in lost income; he unsuccessfully attempted to have the media removed. In August 2014, the United States Copyright Office clarified their rules to explicitly state that items created by a non-human cannot be copyrighted, and lists in their examples a "photograph taken by a monkey", which would appear to reference this case.

== See also ==
- F. D. C. Willard, a cat credited on physics papers
- Animals in art
- Infinite monkey theorem
