= Next friend =

Common law legal terminology

In common law, a next friend (Law French prochein ami) is a person who represents another person who is under age, or, because of disability or otherwise, is unable to maintain a suit on their own behalf and who does not have a legal guardian. They may also be known as a litigation friend, a guardian ad litem, or a litigation guardian. When a relative who is next of kin acts as a next friend for a person, that person is sometimes instead described as the "natural guardian" of the person. A next friend has full power over the proceedings in the action as if he or she were an ordinary plaintiff, until a guardian or guardian ad litem is appointed in the case; but the next friend is entitled to present evidence only on the same basis as any other witness.

== Uses ==
This disability often arises from minority, mental incapacity, or lack of access to counsel. Consequently, every application to the court on behalf of a minor, a mentally incapacitated person, or a person detained without access to an attorney, who does not have a legal guardian or someone authorized to act on their behalf with a power of attorney, must be made through a next friend (prochein ami, prochein amy, or proximus amicus). A minor frequently defends a suit not by a next friend but by a guardian ad litem, often appointed by the court with jurisdiction over the case or by a court with probate jurisdiction.

Some jurisdictions, such as the English civil and family courts, have recognized the right of mature minors to instruct solicitors and apply to the court on their own behalf since the 1990s.

Before the Married Women's Property Act 1882 in English Law and Irish Law (and similar acts during the same period in American law), it was usual for a married woman to sue by a next friend. The act allowed a married woman to sue in all respects as a feme sole, rendering a next friend unnecessary.

Historically, in the case of a minor, the father was prima facie the proper person to act as next friend; in the father's absence, the testamentary guardian, if any, was next friend; but any person not under disability could act as next friend so long as he has no interest in the action adverse to that of the minor. A married woman could not historically act as next friend (feme covert), but this practice is no longer current, at least in the United States, where either or both of a minor's parents may act as next friend. (An exception is in divorce cases or other cases affecting child custody; in such cases, courts often appoint a guardian ad litem or attorney [independent of the parents] to represent the child's interests, which may not be aligned with either parent's interests.)

In the case of mental incapacity, a conservator, guardian, or committee represents the person in court. Still, if they have no such representative, or if the committee has some interest adverse to the claimant, they may sue by a next friend.

In United States law, next friends have sometimes been permitted to litigate habeas corpus actions to challenge the detention of prisoners who are not able to appear in court on their own behalf. For example, family members, attorneys, and non-governmental organizations have sought to bring claims as next friends on behalf of detainees classified as enemy combatants at Guantanamo Bay and elsewhere, during the war on terror following the September 11, 2001 attacks.

Another case arose following the monkey selfie affair, when the animal rights organization People for Ethical Treatment of Animals sued photographer David Slater, asserting itself as the next friend of a Celebes crested macaque.

== See also ==
- McKenzie friend – Non-lawyer who assists a party to a legal matter
