= Mindaugas (name) =

- Gender: Male

Origin
- Region of origin: Lithuania

Mindaugas is a Lithuanian masculine given name and may refer to the following individuals:

- Mindaugas (ca. 1203–1263), Lithuanian medieval Grand Duke of Lithuania and King of Lithuania
- Mindaugas II (1864–1928), German prince who was elected King of Lithuania in 1918 but never reigned
- Mindaugas Girdžiūnas (born 1989), Lithuanian basketball player
- Mindaugas Grigalevičius (born 1981), Lithuanian football striker
- Mindaugas Griškonis (born 1986), Lithuanian rower and Olympic competitor
- Mindaugas Kalonas (born 1984), Lithuanian football midfielder
- Mindaugas Katelynas (born 1983) Lithuanian basketball power forward
- Mindaugas Lukauskis (born 1979), Lithuanian basketball shooting forward and small forward
- Mindaugas Malinauskas (born 1983), Lithuanian football goalkeeper
- Mindaugas Mizgaitis (born 1979), Lithuanian wrestler and Olympic medalist
- Mindaugas Murza (born 1973), Lithuanian nationalist politician
- Mindaugas Panka (born 1984), Lithuanian football midfielder and defender
- Mindaugas Piečaitis (born 1969), Lithuanian composer and conductor
- Mindaugas Rojus (born 1981), Lithuanian opera baritone
- Mindaugas Sadauskas (born 1990), Lithuanian swimmer and Olympic competitor
- Mindaugas Timinskas (born 1974), Lithuanian basketball small forward and Olympic competitor
- Mindaugas Žukauskas (born 1975), Lithuanian basketball small forward, captain and manager

== See also ==
- Mindaugas Bridge, a bridge that crosses Neris River and connects Žirmūnai elderate with the Old Town of Vilnius, Lithuania
