= Roland Dorgelès =

French novelist

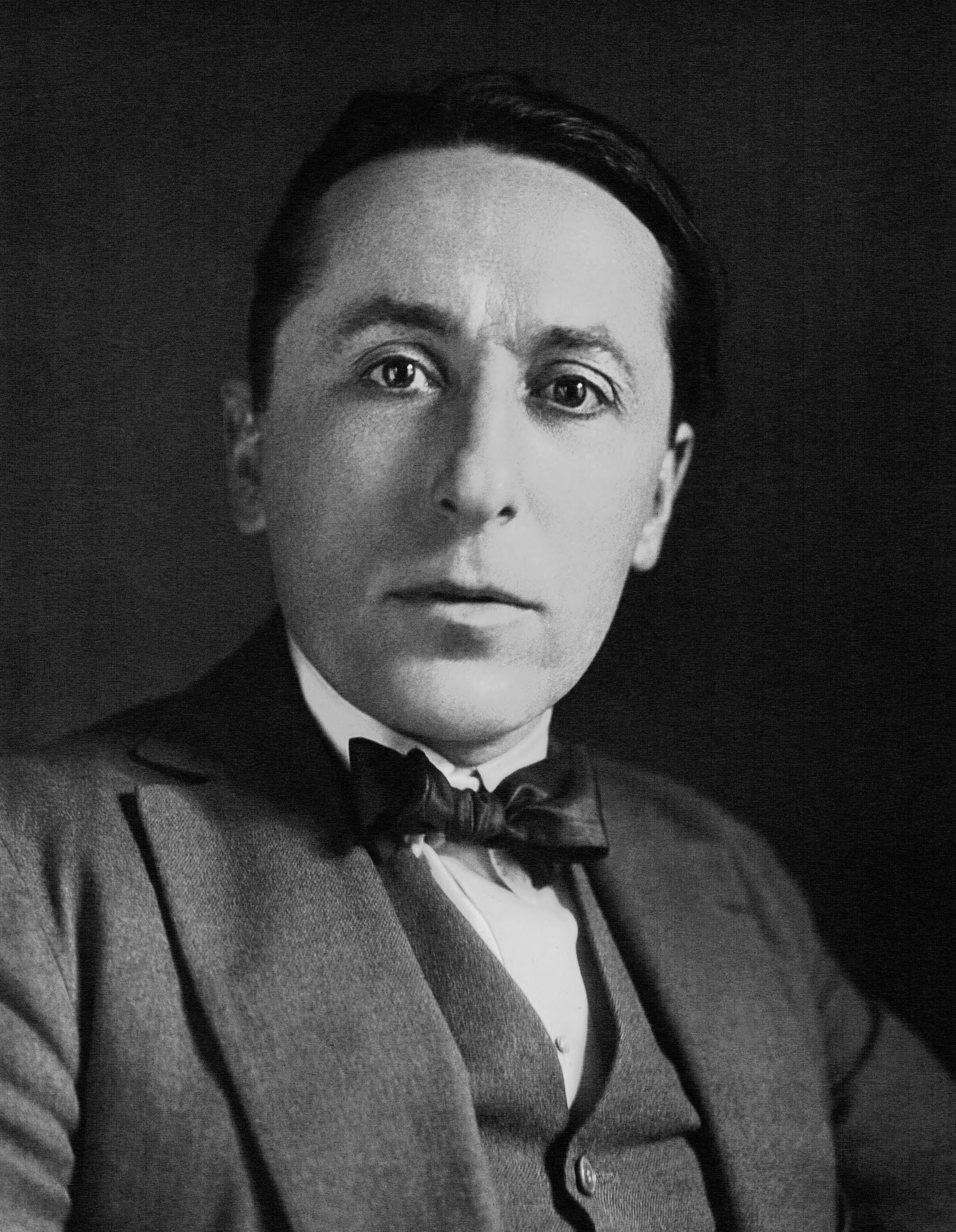
- Roland Dorgelès in 1923
- Born: Roland Lecavelé; 15 June 1885; Amiens, Picardy, France
- Died: 18 March 1973 (aged 87)
- Occupation: Author

Roland Dorgelès (French pronunciation: [dɔʁʒəlɛs]; 15 June 1885 – 18 March 1973) was a French novelist and a member of the Académie Goncourt.

Born in Amiens, Somme, under the name Roland Lecavelé (he adopted the pen name Dorgelès to commemorate visits to the spa town of Argelès), he spent his childhood in Paris.

Dorgelès served as a juror with Florence Meyer Blumenthal in awarding the Prix Blumenthal, a grant given between 1919 and 1954 to painters, sculptors, decorators, engravers, writers and musicians.

== Works ==
Dorgelès is best remembered for the Prix Femina-winning World War I novel Wooden Crosses (Les Croix de bois). He began writing the novel during his time serving in both the French infantry and air force, eventually publishing in 1919. An English translation was published by William Heinemann in 1920. The novel was later adapted into a 1932 film of the same name, which was well-received.

=== Joachim-Raphaël Boronali alias ===
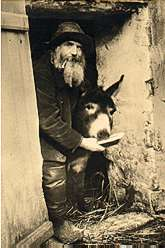
Owner Père Frédé and his donkey Lolo, alias Boronali, in the entrance of the cabaret Lapin Agile

Joachim-Raphaël Boronali was a fictitious Italian painter, created by Dorgelès as part of a prank on the art world. Dorgelès created paintings on canvas by tying a paintbrush to the tail of a donkey named Lolo. One of those paintings, Et le soleil s'endormit sur l'Adriatique (Sunset Over the Adriatic) was submitted to the 1910 Salon des Indépendants and attributed to the 'excessivist' Genoan painter Boronali. It was exhibited and eventually sold for 400 francs (~ $1400 in 2024 value), at which point Dorgelès revealed the hoax. The painting was later donated by Dorgelès to the Orphelinat des Arts. The painting forms part of the permanent collection at l'Espace culturel Paul Bédu (Milly-la-Forêt).

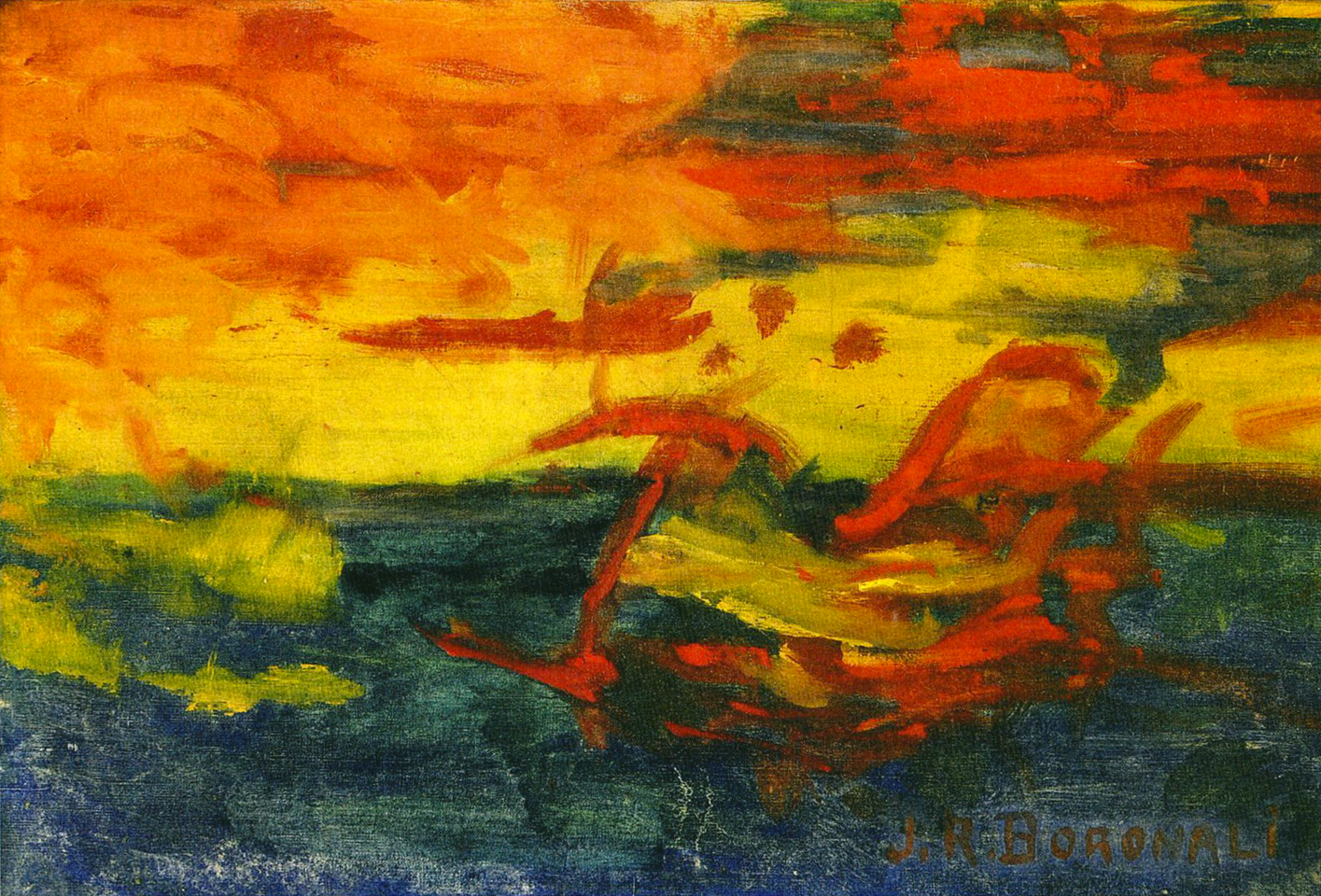
Et le soleil s'endormit sur l'Adriatique (Sunset Over the Adriatic), 54 × 81 cm, painting made by donkey (Lolo) assisted by Roland Dorgelès.

== See also ==
- World War I in literature
- Animal-made art
