= Monkey selfie copyright dispute =

Copyright dispute involving Celebes crested macaques

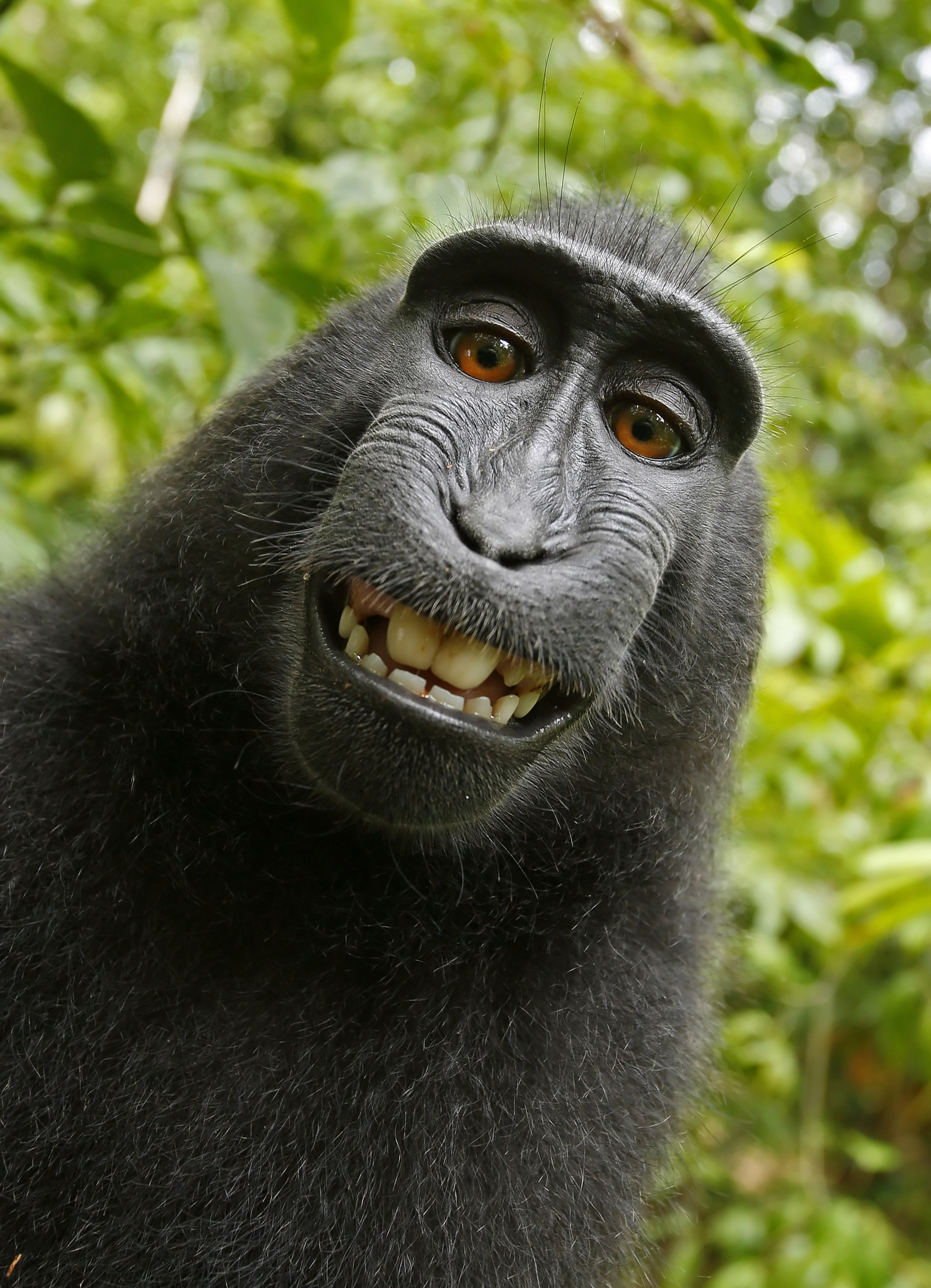
One of the monkey selfies at issue in the dispute

Between 2011 and 2018, a series of disputes took place about the copyright status of selfie photographs taken by Celebes crested macaques, using equipment belonging to British wildlife photographer David J. Slater. The disputes involved Wikimedia Commons and the blog Techdirt, which have hosted the images following their publication in newspapers in July 2011 over Slater's objections that he holds the copyright. Additionally, People for the Ethical Treatment of Animals (PETA) have argued that the copyright should be assigned to the macaque.

Slater has argued that he has a valid copyright claim because he engineered the situation that resulted in the pictures by travelling to Indonesia, befriending a group of wild macaques, and setting up his camera equipment in such a way that a selfie photograph taken by one of the animals might come about. The Wikimedia Foundation's 2014 refusal to remove the pictures from its Wikimedia Commons image library was based on the understanding that copyright is held by the creator, that a non-human creator (not being a legal person) cannot hold copyright, and that the images are thus in the public domain.

Slater stated in August 2014 that, as a result of the pictures being available on Wikipedia, he had lost at least £10,000 (equivalent to £13,819 in 2025) in income and his business as a wildlife photographer was being harmed. In December 2014, the United States Copyright Office stated that works that lack human authorship, such as "a photograph taken by a monkey", cannot have their copyright registered at the US Copyright Office. Several legal experts in the US and UK have argued that Slater's role in the photographic process would have been sufficient to establish a valid copyright claim, though this decision would have to be made by a court.

In a separate dispute, PETA tried to use the monkey selfies to establish a legal precedent that animals should be declared copyright holders. Slater had published a book containing the photographs through the self-publishing company Blurb, Inc. In September 2015, PETA filed a lawsuit against Slater and Blurb, requesting that the copyright be assigned to the macaque and that PETA be appointed to administer proceeds from the photos for the endangered species' benefit. In dismissing PETA's case, a federal district court ruled that a monkey cannot own copyright under US law. PETA appealed. In September 2017, PETA and Slater agreed to a settlement in which PETA would pay for Slater's legal fees in exchange for Slater donating a portion of future revenues on the photographs to wildlife organizations. However, the court of appeals declined to dismiss the appeal and declined to vacate the lower court judgment.

In April 2018, the appeals court ruled against PETA, stating in its judgement that animals cannot legally hold copyrights and expressing concern that PETA's motivations had been to promote their own interests rather than to protect the legal rights of the monkeys.

== Background ==
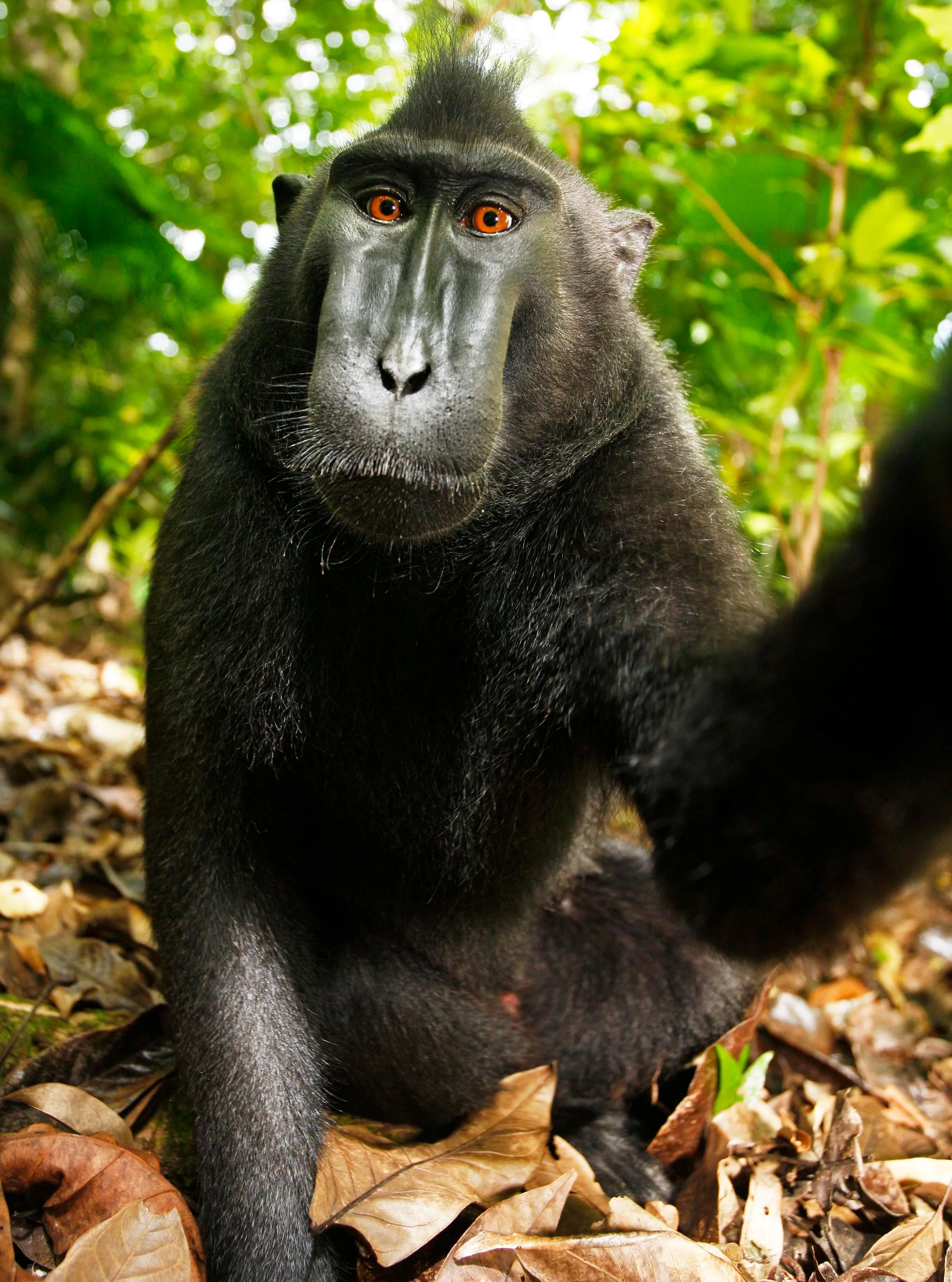
The other disputed image, a full-body "selfie"

Since 2008, British nature photographer David Slater had travelled to Indonesia to take photographs of the critically endangered Celebes crested macaques. In 2011 he licensed several images to the Caters News Agency who released them, along with a written promotional press release with quotes from Slater, for publication in the British media. On 4 July 2011 several publications, including The Telegraph and The Guardian, picked up the story and published the pictures along with articles that quoted Slater as describing the photographs as self-portraits taken by the monkeys, such as "Monkey steals camera to snap himself" (The Telegraph), and "a camera on a tripod" triggered by the monkeys (The Guardian). The articles also contained Slater quotes such as "He must have taken hundreds of pictures by the time I got my camera back." The following day, Amateur Photographer reported that Slater gave them further explanation as to how the photographs were created, downplaying the way newspaper articles had described them; Slater said reports that a monkey ran off with his camera and "began taking self-portraits" were incorrect and that the portrait was shot when his camera had been mounted on a tripod, with the primates playing around with a remote cable release as he fended off other monkeys.

Slater gave further description on his website and in other media accounts, saying he and a guide followed the monkeys for three days, gaining their trust on the second day. According to Slater, in his attempts to get photographs of the monkeys, he found that they were fascinated with the camera equipment and kept playing with it, but they also kept trying to run off with the camera. Slater wrote in a 7 August 2014 Amateur Photographer follow-up article: "I wanted a close-up image but I couldn't do it. They were too nervous, so I had to get them [the monkeys] to come to the camera without me being there and get them to play with the release, which they did (...) They were looking at the reflection in the lens, which they found amusing." In an attempt to get a portrait of the monkeys' faces, Slater said he set the camera on a tripod with a large wide-angle lens attached, and set the camera's settings to optimize the chances of getting a facial close up, using predictive autofocus, motor drive, and a flashgun. Slater further stated that he set the camera's remote shutter trigger next to the camera and, while he held onto the tripod, the monkeys spent 30 minutes looking into the lens and playing with the camera gear, triggering the remote multiple times and capturing many photographs. The session ended when the "dominant male at times became over excited and eventually gave me a whack with his hand as he bounced off my back". Slater also said in a 28 July 2017 Vice magazine interview that some news outlets were misreporting how he obtained the selfie, but he went along with it because it was "a bit of fun and some good publicity for the conservation cause".

== Copyright issues ==
On 9 July 2011, an editor on Wikimedia Commons, a site that only accepts media available under a free content license or in the public domain, uploaded the selfie photographs from The Daily Mail. The uploader claimed that the photographs were in the public domain as "the work of a non-human animal", adding that "it has no human author in whom copyright is vested". Slater discovered this a few days later and requested that the Wikimedia Foundation remove the photos. Initially, an administrator at Commons removed the images, but they were later restored after a community discussion on their copyright nature. Slater continued to challenge the foundation to remove the image. The foundation reviewed the situation, but made the determination that the images were in the public domain and denied Slater's request; in its transparency report for August 2014, the foundation stated "copyright cannot vest in non-human authors" and "when a work's copyright cannot vest in a human, it falls into the public domain".

Slater's conflict with the Wikimedia Foundation was covered by the blog Techdirt on 12 July 2011. Techdirt posted the photograph with a public domain license, arguing that the photograph was in the public domain because the monkey was not a legal person capable of holding a copyright, and Slater could not hold copyright to the photo because he was not involved in its creation. Afterwards, Caters News Agency issued a request for the photo to be removed, citing a lack of permission; however, in response to a reply by the blog's author, Mike Masnick, the representative stated that Masnick had "blatantly 'lifted' these photographs from somewhere – I presume the Daily Mail online", and continued to request its removal. Masnick claimed that even if it were capable of being copyrighted, the photo's use on Techdirt would be considered fair use under United States copyright law. He believed that "regardless of the issue of who does and doesn't own the copyright– it is 100% clear that the copyright owner is not yourself."

Slater counterargued in response to both the Wikimedia Foundation and Techdirt that he had made significant creative contributions to the monkey selfie photographs that would make the public domain argument moot. Slater told the BBC, "I became accepted as part of the troop, they touched me and groomed me (...) so I thought they could take their own photograph. I set the camera up on a tripod, framed [the shot] up and got the exposure right (...) and all you've got to do is give the monkey the button to press and lo and behold you got the picture." In a story published on or before 14 August 2014 on his own website, Slater said that the monkeys stealing the camera was a separate incident that occurred before the "selfies" were taken. Slater went on to say, "I put my camera on a tripod with a very wide angle lens, settings configured such as predictive autofocus, motorwind, even a flashgun, to give me a chance of a facial close up if they were to approach again for a play (...) I had one hand on the tripod when this was going on, but I was being prodded and poked by would be groomers and a few playful juveniles who nibbled at my arms." In a November 2017 interview with the radio show This American Life, Slater said that he was holding the tripod with his fingers when the images were taken.

=== Expert opinions ===
Expert opinion on whether Slater owns the copyright on the photographs is mixed. On 21 August 2014 the United States Copyright Office published an opinion, later included in the third edition of the office's Compendium of U.S. Copyright Office Practices, released on 22 December 2014, to clarify that "only works created by a human can be copyrighted under United States law, which excludes photographs and artwork created by animals or by machines without human intervention" and that "Because copyright law is limited to 'original intellectual conceptions of the author', the [copyright] office will refuse to register a claim if it determines that a human being did not create the work. The Office will not register works produced by nature, animals, or plants." The compendium specifically highlights "a photograph taken by a monkey" as an example of something that cannot be copyrighted.

The intellectual property lawyers Mary M. Luria and Charles Swan said that because the creator of the photograph is an animal and not a person, there is no copyright on the photograph, regardless of who owns the equipment with which the photograph was created. According to the American legal scholar Jessica Litman, "No human author has rights to a photograph taken by a monkey (...) The original monkey selfie is in the public domain". She said that the US Copyright Office was clarifying existing practice, and not creating a new policy. However, the American art lawyer Nicholas O'Donnell of Sullivan & Worcester LLP commented that "even if 'a photograph taken by a monkey' cannot be copyrighted by the monkey, it is not clear why that would categorically rule out any copyright for a human author in a work in which cameras are intentionally left in a place where some natural force or animal will cause them to snap a photo".

On 22 August 2014, the day after the US Copyright Office published their opinion, a spokesperson for the UK Intellectual Property Office was quoted as saying that, while animals cannot own copyright under UK law, "the question as to whether the photographer owns copyright is more complex. It depends on whether the photographer has made a creative contribution to the work and this is a decision which must be made by the courts."

The British media lawyer Christina Michalos said that on the basis of British law on computer-generated art, it is arguable that Slater may own copyrights on the photograph, because he owned and presumably had set up the camera. Similarly, Serena Tierney, of London lawyers BDB, stated, "If he checked the angle of the shot, set up the equipment to produce a picture with specific light and shade effects, set the exposure or used filters or other special settings, light and that everything required is in the shot, and all the monkey contributed was to press the button, then he would seem to have a passable claim that copyright subsists in the photo in the UK and that he is the author and so first owner." Furthermore, Andres Guadamuz, a lecturer in IP law at Sussex University, has written that existing European case law, particularly Infopaq International A/S v Danske Dagblades Forening, makes it clear that the selection of photographs would be enough to warrant originality if the process reflects the personality of the photographer. Iain Connor, a partner in Pinsent Masons, similarly said that the photographer could claim they had "put the camera in the hands of the monkey so [they had] taken some creative steps and therefore own the copyright," and that "if it's an animal that presses the button, it should be the owner of the camera that owns the copyright to that photo."

== Wikimania 2014 ==
The "Monkey-selfie" became a theme at Wikimania 2014 at the Barbican Centre in London. Conference attendees, including Wikipedia co-founder and Wikimedia Foundation board member Jimmy Wales, posed for selfies with printed copies of the macaque photograph. Reaction to these selfies and to pre-printed monkey posters was mixed. According to Wikipedia contributor Andreas Kolbe, writing in Wikipediocracy, Wales' action was criticized by some users on Twitter and Wikipedia "for what appeared like tactless gloating".

== Naruto v. David Slater et al. ==
Naruto v. David Slater
- Court: United States Court of Appeals for the Ninth Circuit
- Full case name: Naruto, a Crested Macaque, by and through his Next Friends, People for the Ethical Treatment of Animals, Inc., Plaintiff-Appellant, v. David John Slater; Blurb, Inc., a Delaware corporation; Wildlife Personalities, LTD., a United Kingdom private limited company, Defendants-Appellees.
- Argued: 12 July 2017
- Decided: 23 April 2018
- Citation: 888 F.3d 418 (9th Cir. 2018)

Holding
- Judgement Affirmed. The Copyright Act did not expressly authorize animals to file copyright infringement suits

Court membership
- Judges sitting: William Horsley Orrick, Norman Randy Smith, Carlos Tiburcio Bea, Eduardo C. Robreno (Note: United States District Judge for the Eastern District of Pennsylvania, sitting by designation.)

Video of oral argument before the Ninth Circuit from 12 July 2017

The macaque photographs appeared in a book titled Wildlife Personalities that Slater had published via San Francisco-based self-publishing company Blurb, Inc. On 22 September 2015, People for the Ethical Treatment of Animals (PETA) filed a lawsuit against Slater and Blurb in the United States District Court for the Northern District of California to request that the monkey, whom they named Naruto, be assigned copyright and that PETA be appointed to administer proceeds from the photos for the benefit of Naruto and other crested macaques in the reserve on Sulawesi. PETA did so by using the next friend principle, which allows persons to sue in the name of another person who is unable to do so. In November, Angela Dunning, the attorney for Blurb, noted that PETA may have been suing on behalf of the wrong monkey.

During a hearing in January 2016, US District Judge William Orrick III said that the copyright law does not extend its protection to animals. Orrick dismissed the case on 28 January, ruling that "if Congress and the president intended to take the extraordinary step of authorizing animals as well as people and legal entities to sue, they could, and should, have said so plainly." On 20 March 2016, PETA filed a notice of appeal to the Ninth Circuit Court of Appeals. On 12 July 2017, the court held an oral argument on the matter in San Francisco. On 4 August 2017, lawyers for all parties to the case informed the court that they expected to arrive at an out-of-court settlement in the near future, asking the court not to issue a ruling. The court on 11 August stayed the appeal to 8 September. An agreement between Slater, Blurb, and PETA was reached on 11 September 2017, in which PETA would pay for Slater's legal fees but that Slater will donate 25 percent of any future revenues from the monkey selfies to charities that protect the wildlife of monkeys like Naruto, but the court has not accepted this agreement as being a valid settlement. As part of their joint motion to dismiss the appeal and vacate the judgment, the parties have asked for vacatur, which would nullify the record in the lower court. The Competitive Enterprise Institute filed an amicus brief on 13 September 2017, urging the court to deny vacatur. The brief argues that since Naruto is not a party to the settlement, PETA does not have standing to move for vacatur.

In April 2018, the Court of Appeals for the Ninth Circuit denied the motions to vacate the case. On 23 April, the court issued its ruling in favour of Slater, finding that animals have no legal authority to hold copyright claims. The court also expressed concern with PETA's motivations and actions during the case that were aligned to promote their own interests rather than to protect Naruto, as they found PETA's actions—i.e. attempting to vacate the case when the group learned of the potential for landmark case law to be set—to be troubling. The judges noted that their decision had to be considered in light of Cetacean Community v. Bush, a 2004 case heard by the Ninth Circuit that found, under some circumstances, animals could have some standing to seek legal action, and encourages that the Ninth Circuit should hold an en banc hearing to review their decision in Cetacean in light of the monkey selfie case. On 25 May, a Ninth Circuit judge made a call for the case to be heard en banc, potentially to overrule the Cetaceans Community precedent. The court requested the parties to provide briefs within 21 days on whether the en banc hearing should be granted and on 31 August, they declined to review the case.

== Impact on Slater ==
Slater told BBC News that he had suffered financial loss as a result of the pictures being available on Wikimedia Commons. He said the photograph had made him £2,000 (equivalent to £2,876 in 2025) in the first year after it was taken, but that interest in purchasing it disappeared after it was used on Wikipedia. He estimated that he had lost £10,000 (equivalent to about £14,000 in 2025) in income, and said it was "killing his business". Slater was quoted by The Daily Telegraph as saying, "What they don't realise is that it needs a court to decide [the copyright]." In January 2016, Slater stated his intention to sue Wikipedia for copyright infringement of his works.

By July 2017, Slater was reported to be having financial problems and was unable to pay his lawyer. While he had originally made a few thousand pounds from the images, enough to recoup his travel costs to Indonesia, this income reduced to about "£100 every few months" when the Wikimedia Foundation refused to stop making the images available without his permission.

Slater was unable to travel to the July 2017 court hearing in the United States for lack of funds and said he was considering alternative careers as a dog walker or tennis coach. He said he was no longer motivated to take photographs, that he had become depressed, and that his efforts to "highlight the plight of the monkeys" had "backfired on my private life" and ruined his life. However, Slater said he was delighted by the impact of the photoshoot itself: "It has taken six years for my original intention to come true which was to highlight the plight of the monkeys and bring it to the world. No one had heard of these monkeys six years ago, they were down to the last thousands. ... The locals used to roast them, but now they love them, they call it the 'selfie monkey'. Tourists are now visiting and people see there is a longer-term benefit to the community than just shooting a monkey."

In May 2018, Condé Nast Entertainment acquired the rights from Slater to make a documentary film related to the monkey selfie dispute. The project was being overseen by Dawn Ostroff and Jeremy Steckler.

== Generative AI copyright precedent ==
Some legal professionals have suggested that Naruto v. Slater could be a potential precedent in copyright litigation over works created by generative AI. In 2023, the U.S. Copyright Office published a guidance on the registration of works containing AI-generated material; Naruto v. Slater was cited as an example of the human authorship requirement.

== See also ==
- Animal ethics
- Animal-made art
- Animal rights
- Artificial intelligence and copyright
- Camera trap
- Monty the meerkat
- List of individual monkeys
- List of photographs considered the most important
