= Nora (cat) =

Cat known for playing piano

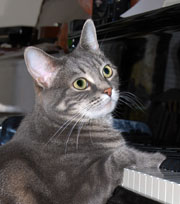
- Nora at the piano
- Other name: Nora the Piano Cat
- Species: Felis catus
- Sex: Female
- Born: September 10, 2004
- Died: February 5, 2024 (aged 19)
- Years active: 2007–2024
- Known for: Playing the piano
- Owners: Burnell Yow and Betsy Alexander

Nora the Piano Cat (September 10, 2004 – February 5, 2024) was a gray tabby cat, rescued from the streets of Camden, New Jersey, by the Furrever Friends animal shelter. Nora gained international prominence after a YouTube video of her playing the piano went viral in 2007. The Times of London, in its online edition, characterized her music as being "something halfway between Philip Glass and free jazz".

The National Science Foundation has included Nora in a video about animal behavior which was shown in museums in the fall of 2007. Pianist Magazine, based in London, featured her in an article.

On February 5, 2024, Betsy Alexander, one of her owners, announced Nora's death on her Facebook page: "She passed peacefully at home on her favorite blanket and surrounded by us".

== CATcerto ==
In 2009, recorded footage of Nora was included in CATcerto, a piece by Lithuanian composer Mindaugas Piečaitis. The first performance of the piece, by Piečaitis and the Klaipėda Chamber Orchestra, was widely broadcast on the Internet.

== See also ==
- Keyboard Cat
- Animal-made art
- Zoomusicology
- List of individual cats
