= Monty the meerkat =

Subject of a hoax

Monty the meerkat is a meerkat that made headlines in the British media in September 2007 for his purported ability to take pictures using a digital camera. The story turned out to be a hoax perpetrated by workers at Longleat Safari Park.

== Story ==
As reported in The Times, Ian Turner, the deputy head warden at the Longleat Safari Park, was photographing meerkats in their enclosure. The pictures were needed to illustrate a new informational brochure about the park. Realizing that he would be better off with a different camera, Turner went out to get one, leaving behind the first camera on a tripod.

When the warden returned, he was surprised to find that the camera he left behind had three more images on its memory card, images that he had not taken. Seeing no-one there but playful meerkats, the astonished photographer decided that the images were taken by a meerkat. After reviewing them, Turner realized that Monty – the head of the mob (group of meerkats) – was not pictured in any of them, from which Turner deduced that Monty must have taken the pictures.

To say I was surprised is an understatement. To actually get up to the camera and take a family portrait is quite incredible. They are some of the more inquisitive creatures here at Longleat and will generally get their nose and paws into most things. I don’t think we’ll be handing over the reins to them just yet but you never know, maybe we have a film crew in the making.

== Coverage ==
The Times wrote that Monty claimed the tripod and "soon discovered how to fire the shutter". It compared the images taken by Monty to the "first snaps taken by human beings", and found the images taken by Monty to be of a better quality. Monty cut off the head of his subject in one frame, but otherwise took a good, albeit slightly out of focus, family portrait of the members of his mob.

The story in The Guardian, which described the meerkats as "turning paparazzi", discussed anthropomorphism and the dangers of training animals to act like humans. It joked that although photographers are sometimes insultingly called "monkeys", until now "cheeky reporters have never had the courage to suggest a meerkat could do a snapper's job."

The Daily Telegraph also covered the story, and compared the images taken by Monty to those taken by photographer David Bailey. Although The Daily Telegraph admitted that the images taken by meerkats were "perhaps not up to standards of David Bailey", it stated they were still "a remarkable achievement for the desert-dwelling creatures, who are arguably most famous for their proclivity for infanticide."

The Daily Mirror stated that not only did meerkats enjoy photography, but "[t]hey also love to wrestle, race and are even said to take part in singing ceremonies similar to yodelling."

Although a few newspapers provided a quote by Ian Turner, the warden, about meerkats getting "their nose and paws into most things", none of them specified which part of their bodies meerkats used to take the images: their noses or their paws, or both.

== Hoax ==
Though most of the British press took the story at face value, a technician from Amateur Photographer stated it was "puzzling" that although reports claimed the images taken by the meerkats were stored on a "digital memory card", the camera used for it was reported as a Canon EOS 650, a 1987 film-based single lens reflex camera. Amateur Photographer requested clarification from the park officials, and the hoax was soon revealed.

Keith Harris, the head warden at the park, "told AP's news editor Chris Cheesman: 'It started off as a joke. It was a slight hoax. The meerkats didn't take any pictures at all'", and that "it wasn't meant to be picked up by newspapers in this way". The original idea for the ruse occurred after park employees noticed the meerkats playing with the camera equipment.

Roy Greenslade of The Guardian stated that he loved "that phrase – a "slight" hoax". On the other hand he found a few kind words to comfort "newspaper photographers": "The revelation of the hoax will certainly be a relief to newspaper photographers, who suffer from the indignity of being called 'monkeys' by reporters. If this had been a true story it would have confirmed the prejudices of their critics."

MSN described the whole story as one of the twelve "Hoaxes of the decade".

== See also ==
- Monkey selfie copyright dispute
