= Et le soleil s'endormit sur l'Adriatique =

Oil on canvas painting from 1910

- The sun fell asleep on the Adriatic (English)
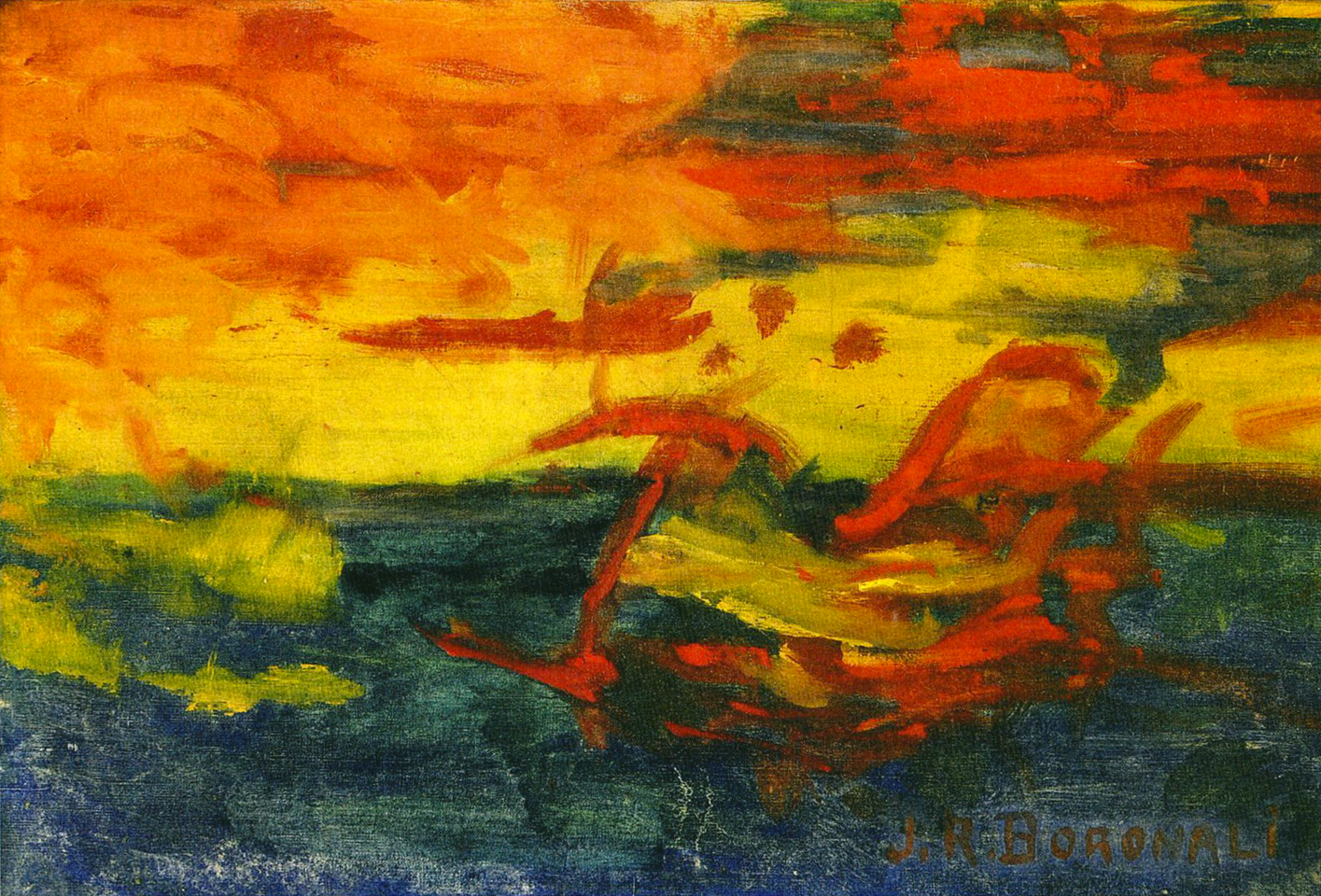
- Et le soleil s'endormit sur l'Adriatique painting
- Artist: Lolo the Donkey, aka Joachim-Raphaël Boronali
- Year: 1910
- Medium: Oil on canvas
- Dimensions: 54 cm × 81 cm (21 in × 32 in)
- Location: Milly-la-Forêt (France)
- Owner: Property of Paul Bédu's heirs

Et le soleil s'endormit sur l'Adriatique (English: The sun fell asleep over the Adriatic) is an oil on canvas painted in 1910 by the tail of a donkey and attributed to the fictitious Italian painter Joachim-Raphaël Boronali. This hoax, exhibited at the Salon des Indépendants, was created by writer Roland Dorgelès to poke fun at modern painting.

== Description ==
The painting is an oil on canvas, 54 centimetres high and 81 centimetres wide. The upper half is painted in vivid orange, yellow, and red, while the lower half is painted in blue. The painting is bordered by a gilded frame that sets it off to its advantage. The work is signed in the lower right-hand corner with the orange letters “J R BORONALI”.

== History ==
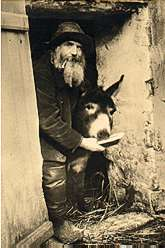
Father Frédé and his donkey Lolo, alias Boronali, in the hamlet of Armenats, commune of Saint-Cyr-sur-Morin.

On March 8, 1910, Roland Dorgelès borrowed Lolo, the donkey, from Frédéric Gérard, known as “le père Frédé”, proprietor of the Lapin agile, a Montmartre cabaret. In the presence of a bailiff, Maître Brionne, Dorgelès had a painting made by Lolo the donkey, to whose tail a paintbrush had been attached. Each time the donkey was given a carrot, it wagged its tail frantically, applying paint to the canvas.

In Room 22 of the Salon des Indépendants in 1910, the public, critics and press discovered a work entitled Et le soleil s'endormit sur l'Adriatique, attributed to a young Italian painter no one had ever heard of: Joachim-Raphaël Boronali (“JR. Boronali, peintre né à Gênes”). Journalists rename the painting Coucher de soleil sur l'Adriatique (English: Sunset on the Adriatic).

Boronali published his Manifesto of Excessivism, in which he justified his new pictorial movement:

Holà! Great excessive painters, my brothers, holà, sublime and renovating brushes, let's break the ancestral palettes and lay down the great principles of tomorrow's painting. His formula is Excessivism. Excess in everything is a defect, said a donkey. On the contrary, we proclaim that excess in everything is a strength, the only strength... Let's ravage absurd museums. Let's trample on infamous routines. Long live scarlet, purple, coruscating gems, all those swirling, superimposed tones, the true reflection of the sun's sublime prism: Long live excess! All our blood to recolor the sick auroras. Let's warm art in the embrace of our steaming arms!

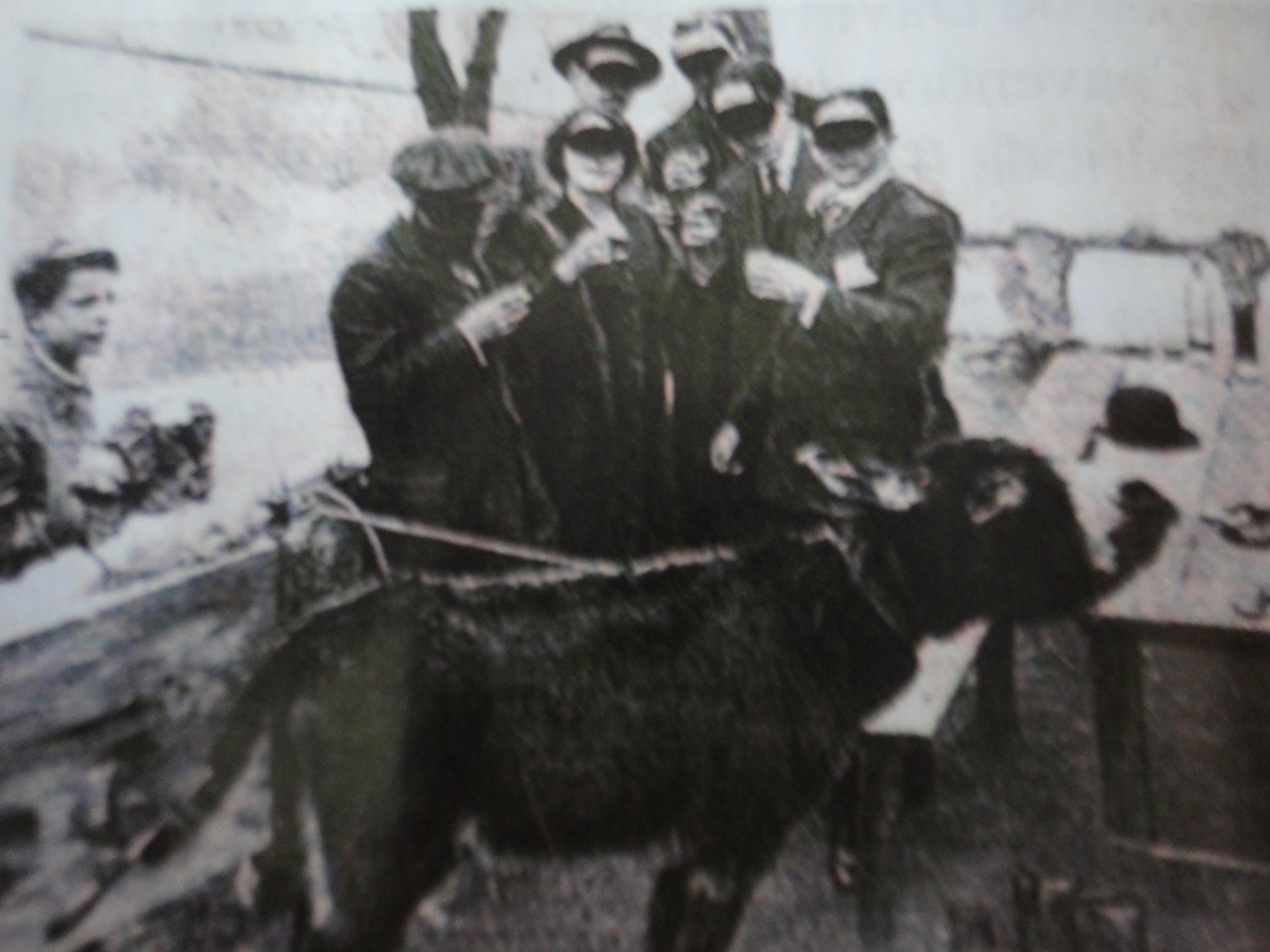
The donkey painting in front of witnesses

Art critics are interested in this painting, which is the subject of a variety of comments. (Note: André Salmon, who wrote about the event in his memoirs, says he has no recollection of “enthusiastic articles, of the delirium of the critics putting the painter Boronali in the foreground” (Salmon, André (1955), Souvenirs sans fin: Première époque (1903-1908) [Endless Memories: First Era (1903-1908)] (in French), Paris: Gallimard). It should also be noted that Guillaume Apollinaire, a witness to the artistic life of the time, claims that the “‘Boronali’ farce mystified no one”, unlike the hoax perpetrated by Hégésippe Simon (Apollinaire, Guillaume (1918-08-01), "Les Échos du Mercure de France" [Echoes of the Mercure de France], Œuvres en prose complètes, Pléiade tome II, Gallimard). Apollinaire himself immediately took up this paragraph in a chapter of Le Flâneur des deux rives (Apolliaire, Guillaume, "Le Flâneur des deux rives" [The Stroller of the Two Shores], Œuvres en prose complètes, Pléiade tome III (in French), Gallimard, p. 40).)

The director of the newspaper L'Illustration receives a visit from Dorgelès, who declares that the painting Et le soleil s'endormit sur l'Adriatique is a hoax. Dorgelès reveals that the painter is a donkey named Lolo, and to prove it, shows a photo of masked jokers drinking behind a donkey with a paintbrush attached to its tail, applying colors to the famous canvas. Dorgelès points out to the director that the name Boronali is an anagram of Aliboron, the emblematic name for donkeys. Dorgelès explains his motivation to “show the simpletons, the incompetents and the conceited who encumber a large part of the Salon des Indépendants that the work of a donkey, brushed with a tail, is not out of place among their works.”

Painter and sculptor André Maillos bought Boronali's painting for 20 louis (400 gold francs, equivalent to €3,500 in 2013). Dorgelès donated this sum to the Orphelinat des Arts. In 1953, art collector Paul Bédu bought the painting. Since then, it has been exhibited at the Espace Culturel Paul-Bédu in Milly-la-Forêt, Essonne.

According to writer Robert Bruce, after Frédé's death, his donkey Lolo was placed in Normandy. He was later found drowned in a pond, which led people at the time to think the animal had committed suicide.

In 2016, this painting was exhibited at the Grand Palais in Paris as part of the Carambolages exhibition.

== Bibliography ==
- Mateo, Pascal (2010). Les plus grands canulars français [France's greatest hoaxes] (in French). Le Papillon Rouge. ISBN 978-2-917875-14-8.
- Dorgelès, Roland (1931). Bouquet de bohème [Bohemian bouquet] (in French). Albin Michel.
- Grojnowski, Daniel (1997). Aux commencements du rire moderne: l'esprit fumiste [The beginnings of modern laughter: the fumist spirit] (in French). Paris: José Corti.
- Nucéra, Louis (2001). Les Contes du Lapin agile [Tales of the Nimble Rabbit] (in French). Paris: Le Cherche Midi Éditeur.
- Alix, Cécile; Devos, Xavière (2015). Coups de pinceau sur les oiseaux ! [Brush strokes on birds!] (in French). Saint-Pierre-des-Corps: Elan Vert. ISBN 978-2-84455-374-4.
