= Bini the Bunny =

Internet-famous rabbit

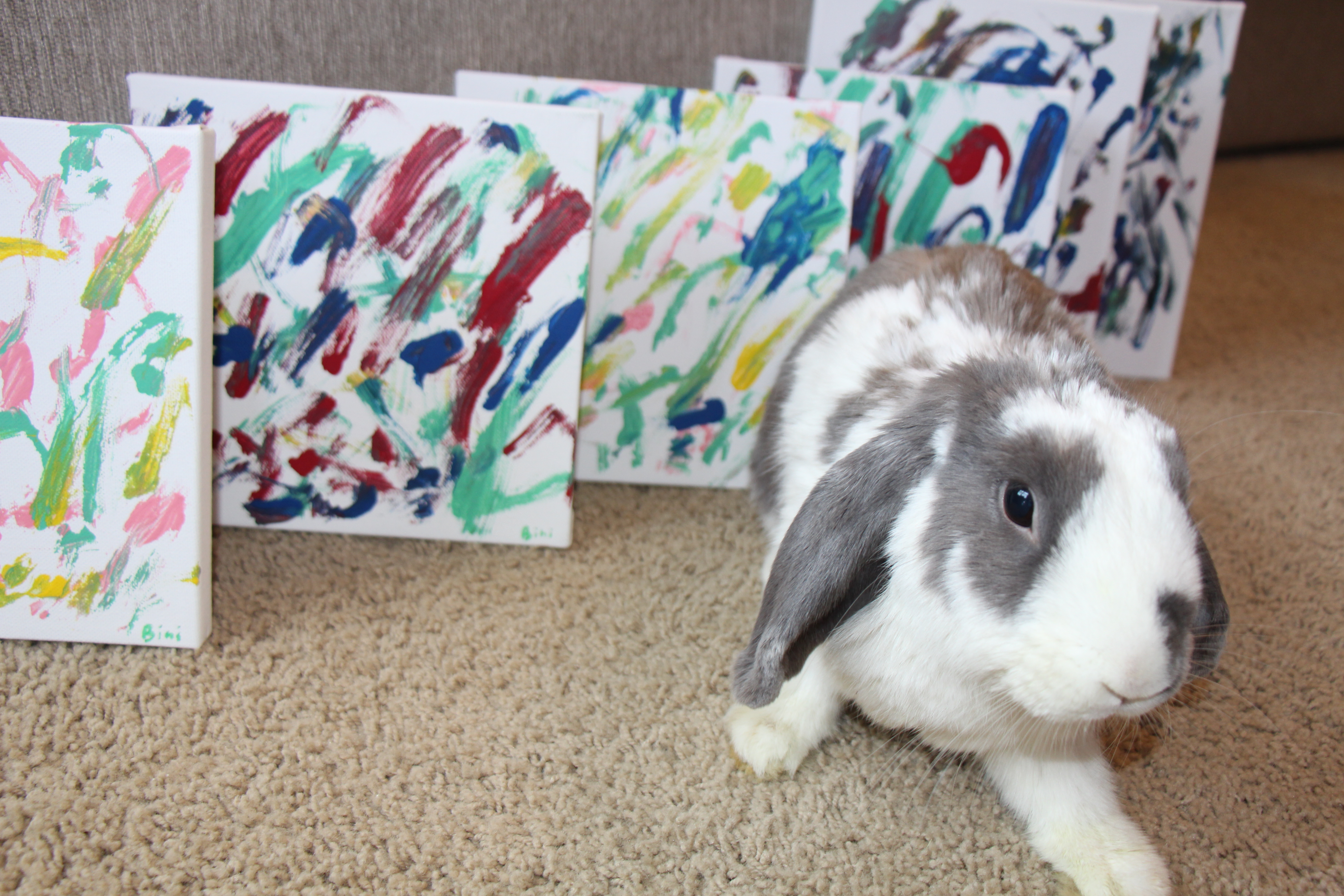
- Bini and his art
- Species: Domestic rabbit
- Breed: Holland Lop
- Sex: Male
- Known for: Internet celebrity
- Tricks: Basketball, Painting, Hair styling
- Owner: Shai Lighter
- Residence: Los Angeles, California, U.S.
- Weight: 5 lb (2 kg)
- Awards: Guinness World Record
- www.facebook.com/Binithebunny

Bini the Bunny is a Holland Lop rabbit, known for a series of viral videos.

Bini is referred to by the media and fans as the only rabbit in the world who could paint, play basketball, play the guitar/piano and comb and style hair. As of 2017, Bini and his owner, Shai Lighter, are Guinness Book of World Record holders for the most slam dunks by a rabbit in one minute.

Bini was featured in various TV shows including The Tonight Show with Jimmy Fallon, two Netflix originals, and participated in America's Got Talent.

Bini's most popular video with over 20 million views was created in 2016, titled "When Your Bunny is Addicted to Arcade Games". Bini's social pages have more than 1 million followers.

== Background ==
Bini has starred in more than 60 videos where his talents and intelligence are exemplified. He first became recognizable through his 2013 YouTube video "Funny bunny plays basketball -Bini the bunny". In 2016, Bini and his owner Shai moved from Israel to Los Angeles, California.

Bini the Bunny's tricks include playing basketball, painting with acrylic paints on canvas, combing and brushing humans' hair, jumping, dancing and spinning on command. In April 2020, Bini the Bunny learned to play the guitar and shared it in his first ever guitar-playing video, in which he plays Señorita by Shawn Mendes and Camila Cabello.

== Media appearances ==
His tricks have been documented on video on various media outlets, and he has been featured in articles by Huffington Post, AOL, USA Today, Fox News, and Sky News, among others. In 2016, Bini the Bunny was featured on LittleThings.com by Jessica Rothhaar and on German TV Network RTL Germany on the variety show Best Of . In July 2017, Bini the Bunny and Shai Lighter were featured on the UK Channel E4 Rude Tube show, Season 11, Episode 9

In July 2017, Bini was on US Weekly magazine

In September 2017, Bini was featured on the cover of Guinness World Records: Amazing Animals

Bini the Bunny and Shai Lighter appeared on The Gong Show on ABC on July 26, 2018. The Gong Show starring Mike Myers, and featured celebrity judges: Will Arnett, Alyson Hannigan, and Lil Rel Howery

In 2018, Bini was invited to the Red Carpet Premiere for the Peter Rabbit movie as a "celebrity rabbit".

On September 27, 2018, Bini the Bunny's first short-feature film was released to the world, titled Rabbit Home Alone which features Shai Lighter, and an array of actors as well as Bini. The movie is a parody of 1990 feature film Home Alone.

In 2019, Bini was featured in National Geographic's book - Weird But True! USA.

In June 2019, Bini the Bunny and his owner Shai Lighter were interviewed on Australia's The Morning Show on Channel 7.

In June 2020, Bini was featured in a new National Geographic's book - Pet Records. The book describes Bini's slam-dunks record.

In April 2021, Bini was featured in the Netflix reality show, Pet Stars (Season 1, episodes 3 and 5).

In June 2021, Bini was featured on The Tonight Show with Jimmy Fallon and showed Jimmy his basketball skill.

In July 2021, Bini the Bunny was featured in the book Little Bunny Dreamer.

In July 2021, Bini the Bunny auditioned and passed the first round in America's Got Talent, he performed in front of the celebrity judges- Simon Cowell, Sofía Vergara, Heidi Klum and Howie Mandel (season 16, episode 8).

In November 2021, Bini the Bunny competed and was featured in World Pet Games on Fox - interspecies competitions.

In January 2022, Bini was featured in a documentary show about intelligent animals - The Secret Life Of Our Pets - Episode 2 on ITV channel .

In February 2022, Bini and Shai Asor Lighter were featured in the PEOPLE magazine and TV Show - (FEB 14, 2022 EDITION).

In June 2022, Bini and Shai were featured and interviewed in the Netflix documentary show, The Hidden Lives of Pets (a documentary about extraordinary pets).

In May 2023, Bini was featured in Little Bunny Dreamer augmented reality app based on his book.

== Awards ==
In October 2016, Bini the Bunny was recognized and awarded a record by Guinness World Records for most slam dunks by a rabbit in 60 seconds.

In 2017, the Facebook page for Bini the Bunny was recognized as "official" by Facebook. Bini has more than 200,000 Facebook fans.

In 2018, YouTube awarded Bini and Shai the Silver Creator Award for reaching and passing 100,000 subscribers.

In 2021, Bini became the first Rabbit to compete in America's Got Talent and pass the Judges Auditions level.

In 2021, Bini competed on World Pet Games on Fox - interspecies competitions - Bini's category was Dunk-Off, he won the bronze medal and broke his own record.
