= Salon des indépendants =

Annual art exhibition in Paris (1884– )

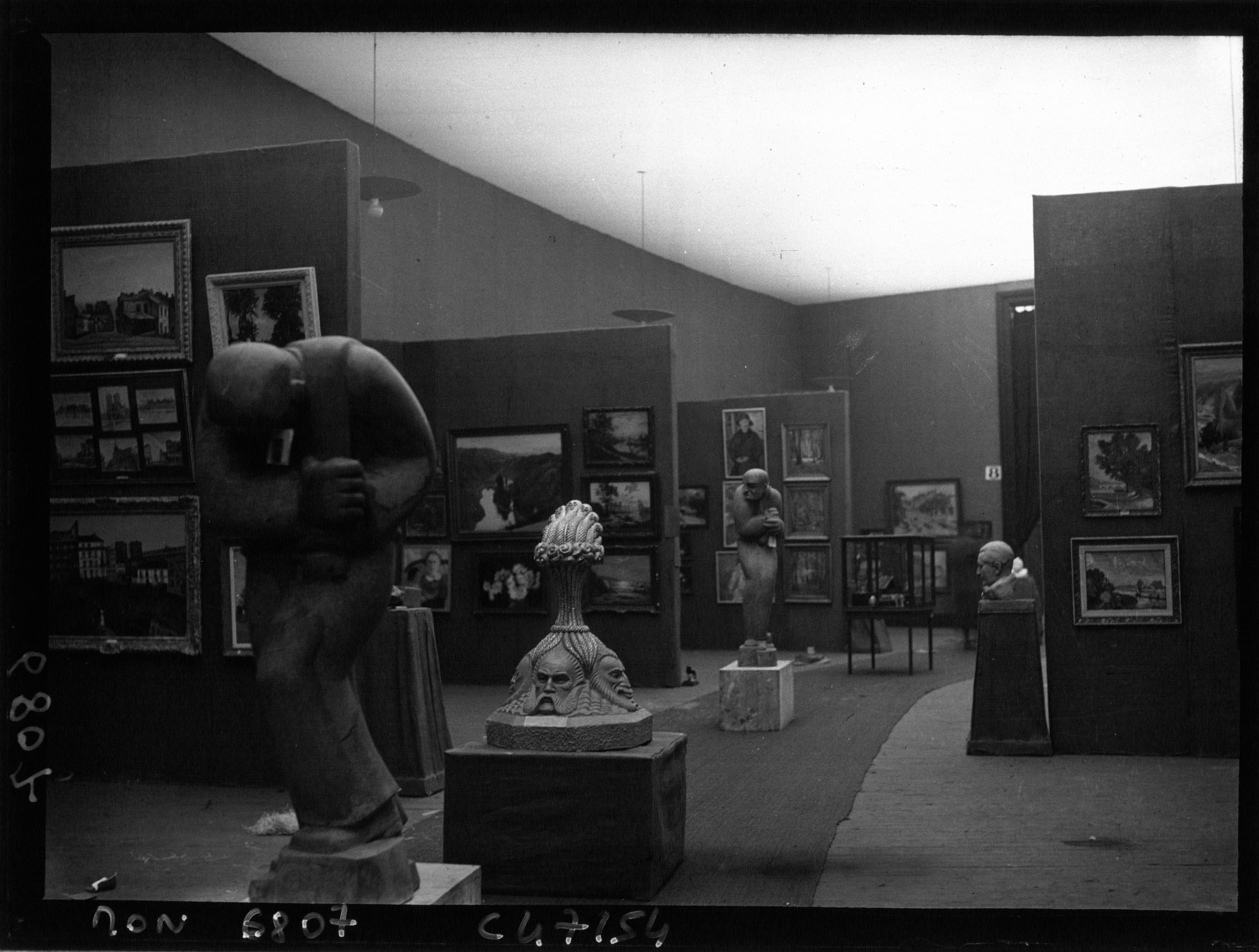
Salon des independents in 1933

The Salon des indépendants is an annual art exhibition in Paris, begun in 1884. Organised by the Société des Artistes Indépendants, it aims to show works by all artists claiming a certain independence in their art and was formed – like the Société – in reaction to artists refused by the juries of the Paris Salon and the dominance of academic art.

== Principles ==
It has no jury or prizes, though it still has an admission commission. In the 1950s Fernand Léger specified that for him the Salon des Indépendants was "above all a salon of painters for painters, ... a salon for artistic display, ... its eternal renewal ... is its reason for existence. Here, there must always be a place for searchers and their concerns. ... The salon des indépendants is a salon of lovers, ... the Salon of Inventors. ... The middle classes who come to laugh at these palpitations never suspect that its a whole play which plays out there, with all its joys and its stories. If they were aware of it, because deep down they are good people, they would enter it with respect, as if it was a church".

The Salon's founders also believed art could contribute to the common good, as expressed by one of its founders, Paul Signac – "Justice in sociology, harmony in art ; [they are the] same thing". It has been representative of the major art movements of the late 19th and 20th centuries - Pointillism, Nabism, Symbolism, Fauvism and Cubism. It attracted many artists from across Europe.

== History and legal life of the Société ==
It was created in 1884 in Paris by artists wishing to exhibit their works freely and free from all juries. The Groupe des indépendants organised a first salon which had some public and critical success. The painter Albert Dubois-Pillet, also a captain in the Republican Guard, gained authority for a site, the "barquement B", rue des Tuileries, though it was disorganised.

Hundreds of artists took part, including Georges Seurat, Charles Angrand, Odilon Redon, Henri-Edmond Cross and Paul Signac, but also mediocre painters – as a 1939 article on it observed "As usual, turnips abounded there, as in all salons whatever colour they may be". Erratic cash management put an end to this first Salon, which had to be financially liquidated. Forty artists thus regrouped under the presidency of Odilon Redon, first meeting on 31 May in the salle Montesquieu at a Duval bouillon at 5 Rue Montesquieu. At that meeting they aimed to create a more viable salon. Among its founder members, Redon and were the first joint-presidents and other founder members were Seurat, Signac, Cross, Marie-Edmond Höner and Angrand.

The general assembly pronounced the salon's foundation on 4 June 1884 and it was constituted that 11 June by depositing its statutes before master Coursault, a notary in Montmorency. On 14 June its statutes were published in the Affiches Parisiennes and on 30 June the legal declaration on the Société's functioning was made at the Préfecture de police. A committee of eleven members was formed on 29 July, presided over by Alfred André Guinard, who signed its statutes, which the artistic press reported on, such as the Le Moniteur des arts of 3 October 1884.

It gained its legal status under the 1 July 1901 law of associations on 4 December 1903 and published its first Journal officiel the following day. It was recognised as a public utility on 30 March 1923.

== Dates and locations ==
Its site and date varied year on year. The first exhibition preceded the official foundation of the Société, taking place as the "Groupe des artistes indépendants" from 15 May 1884 the "Salon des Tuileries", rue des Tuileries under the name – it included some painters such as Alfred Guinard who are now mostly forgotten. Very quickly after the Société's formation it opened a "Salon d'hiver" (winter salon) at the pavillon de la ville de Paris on avenue des Champs-Élysées from 10 December 1884, the first official exhibition – it included Georges Seurat's Bathers at Asnières, Paul Signac's Pont d'Austerlitz and Henri-Edmond Cross's In the jardin du Luxembourg.

The Salons then continued every year except 1885 and from 1914 to 1918. There were also other one-off exhibitions organised by the Société and from 1966 a thematic exhibition alongside the Salon. Since 19 November 2006 the Salon has been held alongside the Salon des artistes français, the Salon de la Société nationale des beaux-arts, the Salon Comparaisons (set up in 1950) and the Salon de dessin et peinture à l'eau (set up in 1953), with the five together known as "Art en capital" ("Art in the capital").

=== Main exhibition ===
- in 1886 (21 August-21 September), rue des Tuileries, building B, near the pavillon de Flore
- in 1887 (26 March-3 May), pavillon de la ville de Paris, Champs-Élysées
- in 1888 (22 March-3 May), pavillon de la ville de Paris
- in 1889 (3 September-4 October), hall of the Société d'horticulture, 84, rue Grenelle-Saint-GerMayn
- in 1890 (20 March-27 April), pavillon de la ville de Paris
- in 1891 (20 March-27 April), pavillon de la ville de Paris
- in 1892 (19 March-27 April), pavillon de la ville de Paris
- in 1893 (18 March-27 April), pavillon de la ville de Paris
- in 1894 (7 April-27 May), palais des Arts libéraux, Champ-de-Mars
- in 1895 (9 April-26 May), palais des Arts libéraux
- in 1896 (1 avril-31 May), palais des Arts libéraux
- in 1897 (3 April-31 May), palais des Arts libéraux
- in 1898 (19 April-12 June), Palais de Glace, Champs-Élysées
- in 1899 (21 October-26 November), Garde-meuble du Colisée, 5, rue du Colisée, Champs-Élysées
- in 1900 (5–25 December), Garde-meuble du Colisée, 5, rue du Colisée
- in 1901 (20 April-21 May), Les Grandes Serres de l'Alma, cours la Reine
- in 1902 (29 March-5 May), Les Grandes Serres de l'Alma
- in 1903 (20 March-25 April), Les Grandes Serres de l'Alma
- in 1904 (21 February-24 March), Les Grandes Serres de l'Alma
- in 1905 (24 March-30 April), Les Grandes Serres de l'Alma
- in 1906 (20 March-30 April), Les Grandes Serres de l'Alma
- in 1907 (24 March-30 April), Les Grandes Serres de l'Alma
- in 1908 (20 March-2 May), Les Grandes Serres de l'Alma
- in 1909 (25 March-2 May), Les Grandes Serres de l'Orangerie, jardin des Tuileries
- in 1910 (18 March-1 May), Les Baraquements du cours la Reine, pont des Invalides
- in 1911 (21 April-13 June), Les Baraquements du quai d'Orsay, pont de l'Alma
- in 1912 (20 March-16 May), Les Baraquements du quai d'Orsay
- in 1913 (19 March-18 May), Les Baraquements du quai d'Orsay
- in 1914 (1 mars-30 April), Les Baraquements du Champ de Mars, avenue de la Bourdonnais, near the École militaire
- in 1920 (28 January-28 February), Grand Palais des Champs-Élysées, avenue Victor-Emmanuel III
- in 1921 (23 January-28 February), Grand Palais des Champs-Élysées
- in 1922 (28 January-28 February), Grand Palais des Champs-Élysées
- in 1923 (10 February-10 March), Grand Palais des Champs-Élysées
- in 1924 (9 February-12 March), Grand Palais des Champs-Élysées
- in 1926 (20 March-2 May), Palais de Bois, 93, avenue de la Grande-Armée, Porte Mayllot
- in 1927 (21 January-27 February), Grand Palais des Champs-Élysées
- in 1928 (20 January-29 February), Grand Palais des Champs-Élysées
- in 1929 (18 January-28 February), Grand Palais des Champs-Élysées
- in 1930 (17 January-2 March), Grand Palais des Champs-Élysées
- in 1931 (23 January-1 March), Grand Palais des Champs-Élysées
- in 1932 (22 January-28 February), Grand Palais des Champs-Élysées
- in 1933 (20 January-26 February), Grand Palais des Champs-Élysées
- in 1934 (2 February-11 March), Grand Palais des Champs-Élysées
- in 1935 (28 January-3 March), Grand Palais des Champs-Élysées
- in 1936 (7 February-8 March), Grand Palais des Champs-Élysées
- in 1937 (5 March-4 April), Grand Palais des Champs-Élysées
- in 1938 (4 March-3 April), Grand Palais des Champs-Élysées
- in 1939 (17 March-10 April), Grand Palais des Champs-Élysées
- in 1940 (1 March-25 March) palais de Chaillot, place du Trocadéro
- in 1941 (14 March-6 April), musée des beaux arts de la ville de Paris, avenue de Tokyo
- in 1942 (6 March-6 April), musée des beaux arts de la ville de Paris
- in 1943 (14 March-11 April), musée des beaux arts de la ville de Paris
- in 1944 (3 March-2 April), musée des beaux arts de la ville de Paris
- in 1945 (2 March-2 April), musée des beaux arts de la ville de Paris
- in 1946 (1 March-30 March), Grand Palais des Champs-Élysées
- in 1939 (17 March-10 April), Grand Palais des Champs-Élysées
- in 1940 (1 March-25 March) palais de Chaillot, place du Trocadéro
- in 1941 (14 March-6 April), musée des beaux arts de la ville de Paris
- in 1942 (6 March-6 April), musée des beaux arts de la ville de Paris
- in 1943 (14 March-11 April), musée des beaux arts de la ville de Paris
- in 1944 (3 March-2 April), musée des beaux arts de la ville de Paris
- in 1945 (2 March-2 April), musée des beaux arts de la ville de Paris
- in 1946 (1 March-30 March) avenue Victor-Emmanuel III
- in 1939 (17 March-10 April), Grand Palais des Champs-Élysées
- in 1940 (1 March-25 March) palais de Chaillot
- in 1941 (14 March-6 April), musée des beaux arts de la ville de Paris
- in 1942 (6 March-6 April), musée des beaux arts de la ville de Paris
- in 1943 (14 March-11 April), musée des beaux arts de la ville de Paris
- in 1944 (3 March-2 April), musée des beaux arts de la ville de Paris
- in 1945 (2 March-2 April), musée des beaux arts de la ville de Paris
- in 1946 (1 March-30 March), musée des beaux arts de la ville de Paris, avenue de New York
- in 1947 (28 February-30 March), musée des beaux arts de la ville de Paris
- in 1948 (4 March-4 April), musée des beaux arts de la ville de Paris
- in 1949 (22 April-15 May), musée des beaux arts de la ville de Paris
- in 1950 (8 April-30 April), Grand Palais des Champs-Élysées
- in 1951 (31 March-22 April), Grand Palais des Champs-Élysées
- in 1952 (23 April-18 May), Grand Palais des Champs-Élysées
- in 1953 (17 April-10 May), Grand Palais des Champs-Élysées
- in 1954 (14 April-9 May), Grand Palais des Champs-Élysées
- in 1955 (15 April-8 May), Grand Palais des Champs-Élysées
- in 1956 (19 April-13 May), Grand Palais des Champs-Élysées
- in 1957 (31 May-23 June), Grand Palais des Champs-Élysées
- in 1958 (18 April-11 May), Grand Palais des Champs-Élysées
- in 1959 (17 April-10 May), Grand Palais des Champs-Élysées
- in 1960 (22 April-15 May), Grand Palais des Champs-Élysées
- in 1961 (21 April-14 May), Grand Palais des Champs-Élysées
- in 1962 (12 April-6 May), Grand Palais des Champs-Élysées
- in 1963 (10 April-8 May), Grand Palais des Champs-Élysées
- in 1964 (10 April-3 May), Grand Palais des Champs-Élysées
- in 1965 (23 April-16 May), Grand Palais des Champs-Élysées

=== Associated exhibitions – Grand Palais des Champs-Élysées ===
- in 1966 (29 March-17 May); « Les Indépendants à la Belle Époque »
- in 1967 (23 March-16 April); « Les Indépendants de 1902 à 1905 »
- in 1968 (23 March-16 April); « Les Indépendants de 1905 à 1909 »
- in 1969 (28 March-20 April); « Les Indépendants in 1910 »
- in 1970 (26 March-19 April); « Les Indépendants de 1911 à 1914 »
- in 1971 (16 April-9 May); « De Pont-Aven aux Nabis, 1883–1903 »
- in 1972 (6 April-26 April); « Fauves et Cubistes »
- in 1973 (23 March-10 April); « L'Art in 1912–1919 »
- in 1974 (21 March-8 April); « Portes ouvertes aux jeunes »
- in 1975 (7 March-27 March); « La Femme peintre et sculpteur au Xxe siecle »
- in 1976 (11 March-4 April); « L'Art égyptien contemporain »
- in 1977 (10 March-3 April); « Horizon-Jeunesse / Perspectives israéliennes »
- in 1978 (16 March-9 April); « Le 70e anniversaire du cubisme »
- in 1979 (8 February-5 March); « L'Or des années folles »
- in 1980 (13 March-13 April); « L'Amérique aux indépendants »
- in 1981 (5 March-5 April); « Les Grands décorateurs »
- in 1982 (14 April-2 May); « Le Génie des naïfs »
- in 1983 (8 March-27 March); « Montmartre, les ateliers du génie »
- in 1984 (8 April-2 May); « Un siècle, 100 chefs-d'œuvre »
- in 1985 (6 June-26 July); « De la Bible à nos jours »
- in 1986 (5 April-27 April); « La Femme, corps et âme »
- in 1987 (11 April-3 May); « Comment peindre la Joconde en évitant les craquelures »
- in 1988 (13 April-1 May); « Les Artistes témoins de Paris »
- in 1989 (3 February-12 February); « La Conquête de la liberté artistique »
- in 1990 (10 May-22 May); « Van Gogh aux Indépendants »
- in 1991 (7 November-24 November); « Rétrospective Paul Delvaux »
- in 1992 (19 November-29 November); « Rétrospective Fernando Botero »
- in 1993 (5 November-21 November); « Le Triomphe du trompe-l'œil »

=== Associated exhibitions – espace Eiffel-Branly ===
- in 1994 (2 December-21 December; « Du chemin de fer à Eurotunnel »
- in 1995 (26 October-5 November; « Le Trésor des indépendants »
- in 1996 (13 December-22 December; « Fleuves au long cours »
- in 1997 (24 October-2 November; « La Fin du siècle »
- in 1998 (23 October-1 November; « Le sport dans l'art »
- in 1999 (22 October-31 October; « Peintres et sculpteurs contemporains »
- 2000 (20 October-29 October; « La Joconde change de siècle »

=== One-off exhibitions ===
- 1926 : « Trente ans d'Art Indépendant », retrospective, 20 February – 21 March, Grand Palais des Champs-Élysées, avenue Alexandre III
- 1934 : « Exposition du cinquantenaire »
- 1938 : « Exposition de la Société des artistes indépendants néerlandais »
- 1939 : « Centenaire de Paul Cézanne »
- 1983–1984 : « Montmartre, les ateliers du génie ». Au Japon : Tokyo, Osaka, Kyoto, Kita Kyü Shü, Miyazaki
- 1984 : « Exposition du Centenaire », marking the Societe's centenary
- 1989–1990 : « Comment peindre la Joconde ». Au Japon : Tokyo, Osaka, Kyoto, Aomori, Niigata

== Bibliography (in French) ==
- Arthur Cravan, « L'Exposition des Indépendants », revue Maintenant, no. 4, 1914
- Jean Monneret, Catalogue raisonné des artistes indépendants, Paris, éditions Éric Koehler, 1999 ISBN 290722039X
- Jean Monneret, Catalogue raisonné du Salon des Indépendants 1884–2000 : les Indépendants dans l'histoire de l'art, Paris, 2000 ISBN 2907220454
- Dominique Lobstein (preface by Serge Lemoine), Dictionnaire des Indépendants, Dijon, L'Échelle de Jacob, 2003 ISBN 2913224431
- Pierre Sanchez (preface by Emmanuel Bréon), Dictionnaire des Indépendants : répertoire des exposants et liste des œuvres présentées : 1920–1950, Dijon, L'Échelle de Jacob, 2008 ISBN 9782913224773
- Léger, Fernand (1965). Fonctions de la peinture. Gonthier. ; rééd. Paris, Gallimard, 1997 ISBN 978-2-07-032921-2
