= Klaipėda Chamber Orchestra =

Klaipėda Chamber Orchestra (Lithuanian: Klaipėdos kamerinis orkestras) is a chamber orchestra in the Lithuanian city of Klaipėda. It was founded in 1992 by violist Liuda Kuraitienė, who remained orchestra's artistic director. In June 2009, she was succeeded by cellist Mindaugas Bačkus. Over the years, the orchestra delivered over 400 concerts and participated in various domestic and international music festivals. The orchestra also organizes Playful Music Orchestra, an educational program that allow schoolchildren to perform with professionals.
