= Institute for Marine Mammal Studies =

Coordinates: 30.420498°N 89.018896°W

- Abbreviation: IMMS
- Formation: 1984
- Type: Nonprofit organization
- Purpose: Education, conservation, and research on marine mammals
- Headquarters: Gulfport, Mississippi
- Region served: Mississippi, Louisiana, Alabama, United States
- Director: Dr. Mobashir A. Solangi

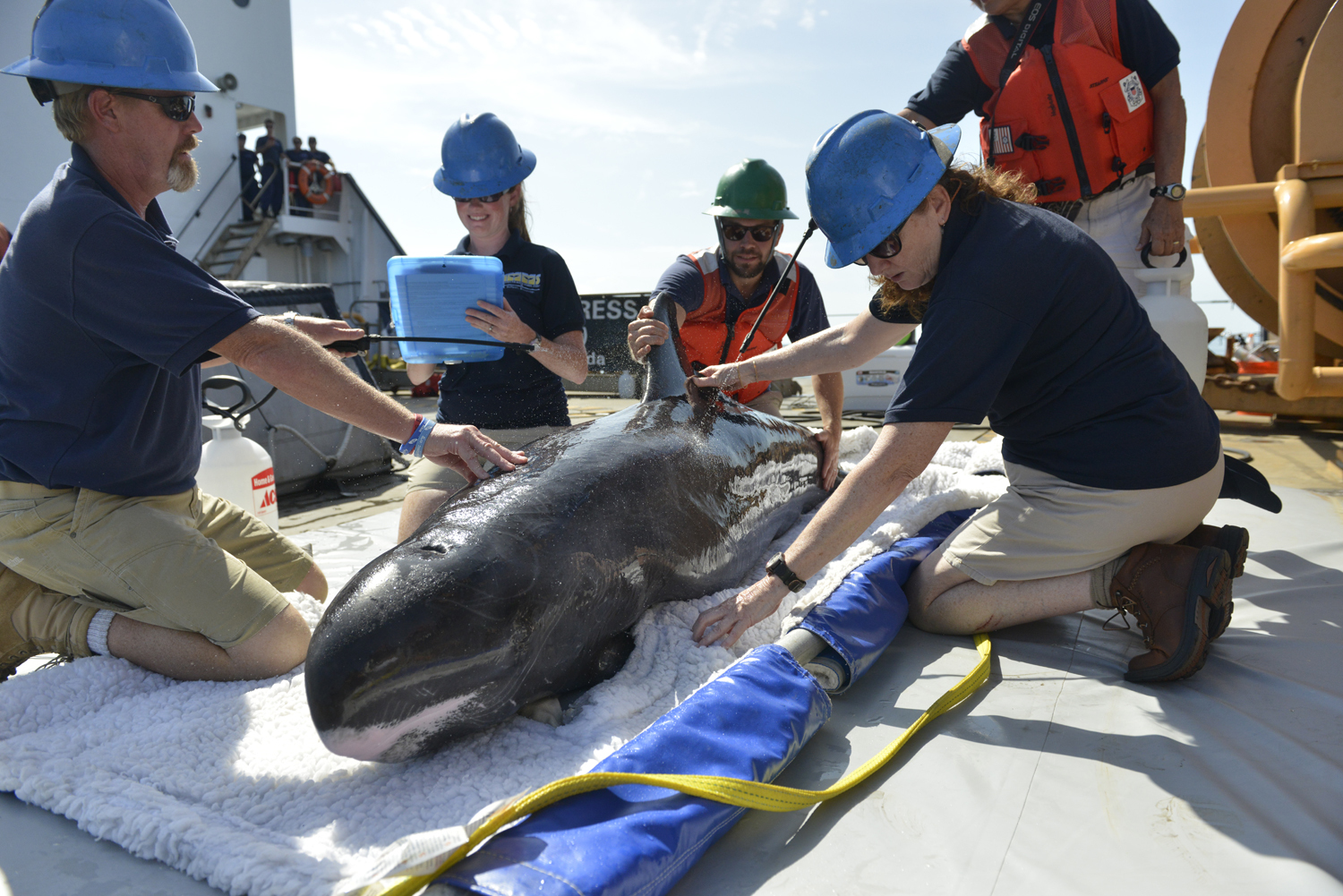
Teams from the Institute for Marine Mammal Studies keep a pygmy killer whale hydrated while they prep it for release into the Gulf of Mexico

The Institute for Marine Mammal Studies ("IMMS") is a research organization located in Gulfport, Mississippi, and dedicated to education, conservation, and research on marine mammals in the wild and in captivity. It was founded in 1984 as a research organization funded by Marine Life Oceanarium and its sister company Marine Animal Productions and recognized as a non-profit 501c(3) in 1995. The director since its founding has been Dr. Mobashir A. (Moby) Solangi. It has been an active participant of the Marine Mammal Health and Stranding Response Program since its inception.

The Institute cares for sick and injured marine mammals in the Mississippi-Louisiana-Alabama subregion of the Gulf Coast. It also has programs for conservation, education and research on marine mammals and their environment. Every summer it holds a week-long educational day camp including activities involving dolphins, sea lions, rays, and sharks.

The Institute's Ocean Adventures Marine Park, also located in Gulfport, features shows involving dolphins, sea lions, birds, stingrays, and reptiles. A dolphin encounter can be purchased there.

The Institute for Marine Mammal Studies has received grants of several million dollars from the National Oceanic and Atmospheric Administration. It has conducted research studies in cooperation with scientists from the University of Southern Mississippi, Mississippi State, Jackson State, Oklahoma State, Portland State, University of Miami, University of California Berkeley, National Marine Fisheries Service, Naval Ocean Systems Center, Louisiana State, and the Naval Research Laboratory.
