= Mindaugas Piečaitis =

Lithuanian composer and conductor (born 1969)

Mindaugas Piečaitis (born 1969) is a Lithuanian composer and conductor who has worked with several major Lithuanian musical organizations. He gained international attention as the composer and conductor of a chamber orchestra piece featuring a performance by Nora, a cat who plays the piano.

On 5 June 2009, the chamber piece was performed publicly by the Klaipėda Chamber Orchestra. (Klaipėda is Piecaitis' home town.)

== Biography ==
Born in Vilnius, Piečaitis graduated from its M. K. Čiurlionis School of Arts in 1987. He received diplomas in Choir Conducting, Orchestra Conducting, and Symphony – Opera Conducting from the Lithuanian Academy of Music during the 1990s. Since then he has worked in staging and conducting performances at the Lithuanian National Opera and Ballet Theatre, the Kaunas Music Theater, the Lithuanian State Symphony Orchestra, and the Klaipėda Musical Theater. He is currently the conductor of the Klaipėda Chamber Orchestra.

Piečaitis is notable for his innovative approach to classical music, and for supporting young musicians in their careers and including them in his performances.

== CATcerto ==
Piečaitis wrote his first musical composition, CATcerto, after receiving emails about Nora. Her owners replied to his request for video footage; Piečaitis and the Chamber Orchestra first performed the piece on June 5, 2009. A little over four minutes long, it was widely broadcast on the Internet. A second live performance was staged at the Hot Springs Music Festival in 2010.
