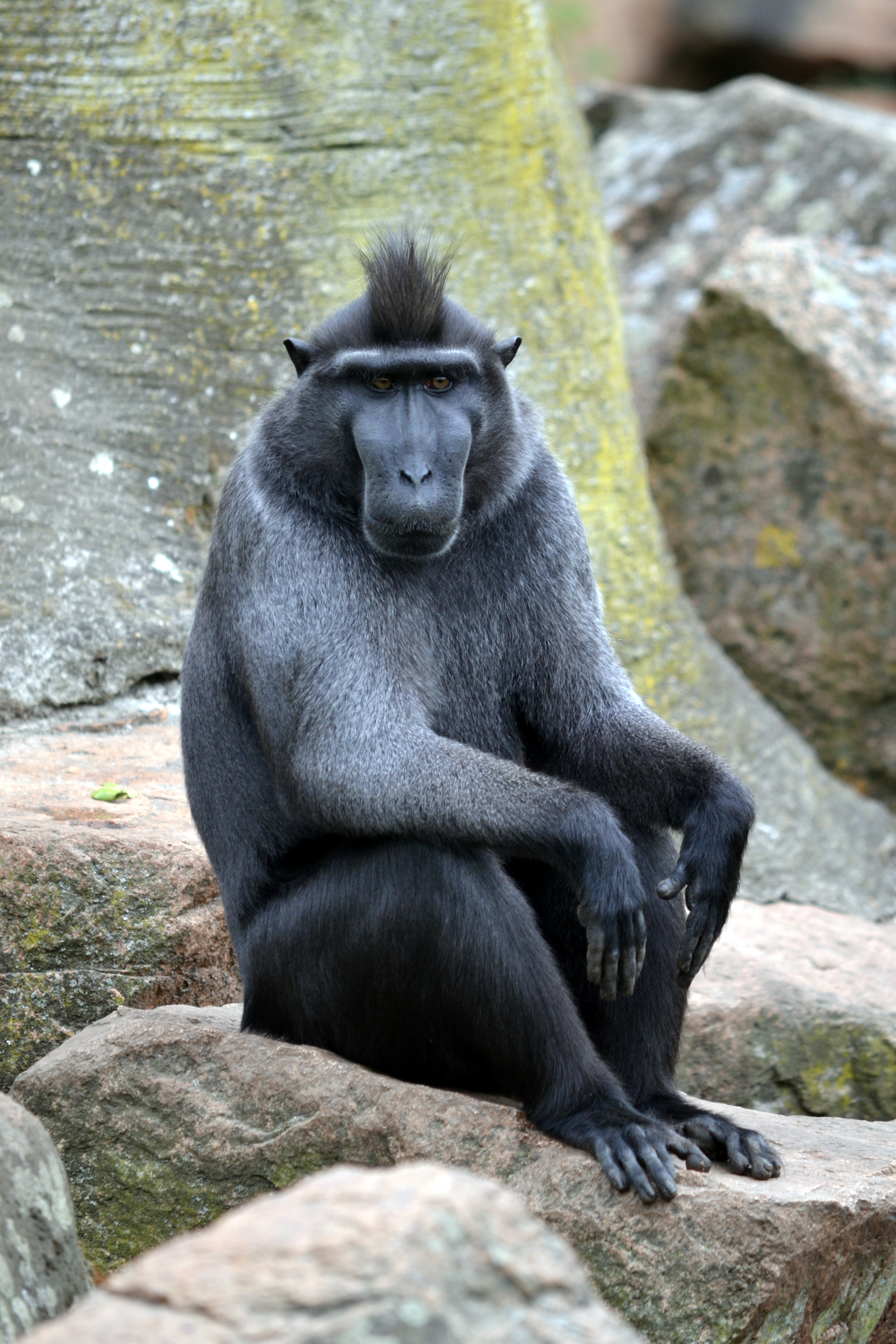
- Celebes crested macaque at Diergaarde Blijdorp in Rotterdam, Netherlands

Conservation status
- Critically Endangered (IUCN 3.1)

Scientific classification
- Kingdom: Animalia
- Phylum: Chordata
- Class: Mammalia
- Order: Primates
- Family: Cercopithecidae
- Genus: Macaca
- Species: M. nigra

Binomial name
- Macaca nigra (Desmarest, 1822)
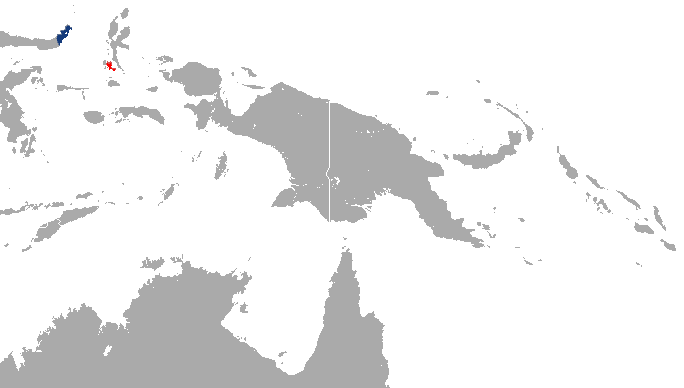
- Celebes crested macaque range (blue—native, red—introduced)

= Celebes crested macaque =

Species of Old World monkey

The Celebes crested macaque (Macaca nigra), also known as the crested black macaque, Sulawesi crested macaque, or the black ape, is an Old World monkey that lives in the tropical regions of north Sulawesi.

== Description ==
Locally known as yaki, wolai, or bolai, its skin and hairless face is, with the exception of some white hair in the shoulder range, entirely jet black. It has a long muzzle with high cheeks, a long hair tuft, or crest, at the top of the head and striking reddish-brown eyes, unusual for a primate. Uniquely among macaques, males and young females bear a heart-shaped skin pad on the rump.Although possessing a markedly ape-like appearance, it has an almost non-existent, non-visible, vestigial tail stub of only approximately 2 cm (0.8 in). Females grow up to 44 to 55 cm (17 to 22 in), and up to 5.5 lb (2.5 kg), while males grow up to 52 to 57 cm (20 to 22 in), and up to 9.5 to 12.7 kg (21 to 28 lb), it is one of the smaller macaque species. Its life expectancy is estimated at 18 years in the wild, and 34 was the maximum in captivity.

== Distribution and habitat ==
Macaca nigra has around eight subpopulations, with a introduced population on the island of Bacan. M. nigra seems to prefer closed canopy forests, with the occupancy being higher along with protected areas.

== Ecology ==
The Celebes crested macaque is a diurnal rain forest dweller. This macaque is primarily terrestrial, spending more than 60% of its day on the ground foraging for food and socialising, while sleeping and searching for food in the trees.

The Celebes crested macaque is frugivorous, with 70% of its diet consisting of fruits. It also consumes leaves, buds, seeds, mushrooms, small birds and bird eggs, insects (such as beetles and caterpillars) worms, snails, spiders and the occasional small lizard or frog.

== Group behaviour ==
It lives typically in groups of five to twenty-five animals, and occasionally in groups of up to seventy-five animals. Smaller groups have only a single adult male, while larger groups have up to four adult males. However, adult females always outnumber adult males by about 4:1. Young adult males are forced to leave their birth group upon maturity, sometimes forming bachelor groups, before seeking a connection to an existing adult mixed-sex group. Communication consists of various sounds and gestures; such as the presentation of the long canine teeth while grimacing, a clearly threatening gesture.

The Celebes crested macaque is promiscuous, with both males and females mating multiple times with multiple partners. The receptivity of the females is clearly indicated by an extreme tumescence (swelling) and redness of their buttocks which, in contrast to the black skin colour, is particularly noticeable. The gestation time is 174 days, and the birth of the usually single offspring happens in the spring when food is more plentiful. Young animals are nursed for approximately one year, becoming fully mature in three to four years, females somewhat sooner than males.

== Human interactions ==
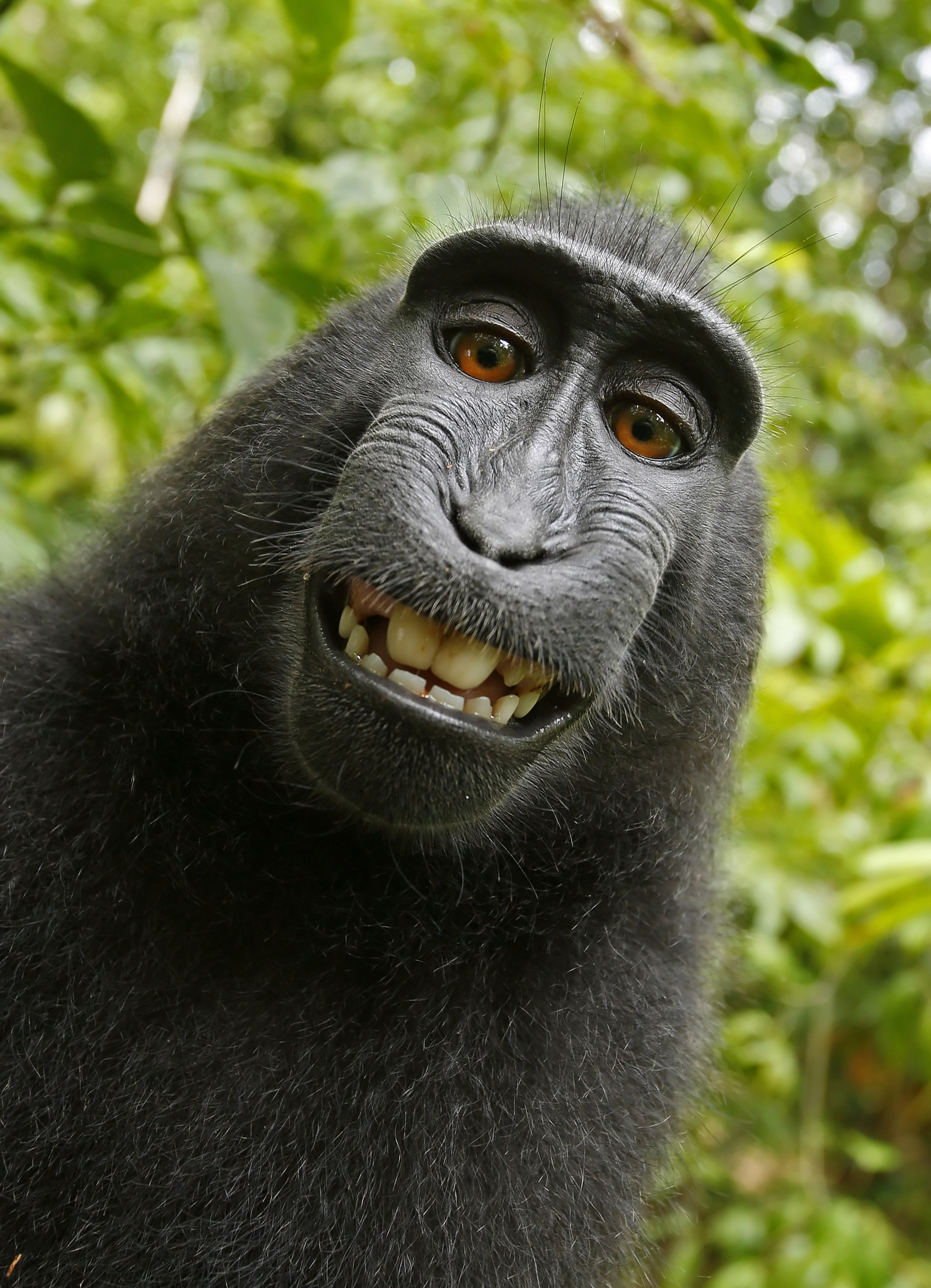
Self-portrait photograph (the 2011 'monkey selfie')

Because it will consume crop plants, the Celebes crested macaque is hunted as a pest. It is also hunted to provide bushmeat. Clearing the rain forests further threatens its survival. Its situation on the small neighbouring islands of Sulawesi (such as Bacan) is somewhat better, since these have a low human population. The total population of the macaque on Sulawesi is estimated at 4,000–6,000, while a booming population of up to 100,000 monkeys is found on Bacan.

A series of survey trips to Sulawesi and the Minahasa forest area were made in 2004–2009 by Vicky Melfi, who was European Endangered Species Programme (EEP) studbook holder for these macaques, based at Paignton Zoo / the Whitley Wildlife Conservation Trust. She monitored the population density, which had declined from over 300 individuals per square kilometre in 1980, to fewer than 20 to 60 individuals today. She founded the conservation programme called Selamatkan Yaki, or Save the Yaki, as this macaque is known in the local language, with local partners and other conservation organisations, including a number of European zoos. Both Newquay Zoo and Paignton Zoo are among a number of mostly European zoos which hold ex-situ breeding populations of this animal.

Since 2006, the Macaca Nigra Project has been studying the biology and promoting the conservation of this species. The project, a collaboration between the German Primate Centre and the Bogor Agricultural Institute, is run by Antje Engelhardt, and located in the Tangkoko reserve, home of the biggest crested macaque population remaining in the species' original distribution range.

Nevertheless, despite being critically endangered, crested black macaque are still unprotected outside of Tangkoko reserve, and they are regularly hunted and slaughtered. They are easily caught and killed, as they have no fear of humans. Crested black macaque is considered a delicacy by local residents.

In 2013, wildlife cameraman Colin Stafford-Johnson spent time on Sulawesi, filming the monkeys at close quarters for a BBC documentary entitled Meet the Monkeys.

In 2014, considerable discussion of copyright issues was generated by a 'selfie' photograph taken by a Celebes crested macaque.

== See also ==
- Barbary macaque
