= Herbert Whitley =

British zookeeper (1886–1955)

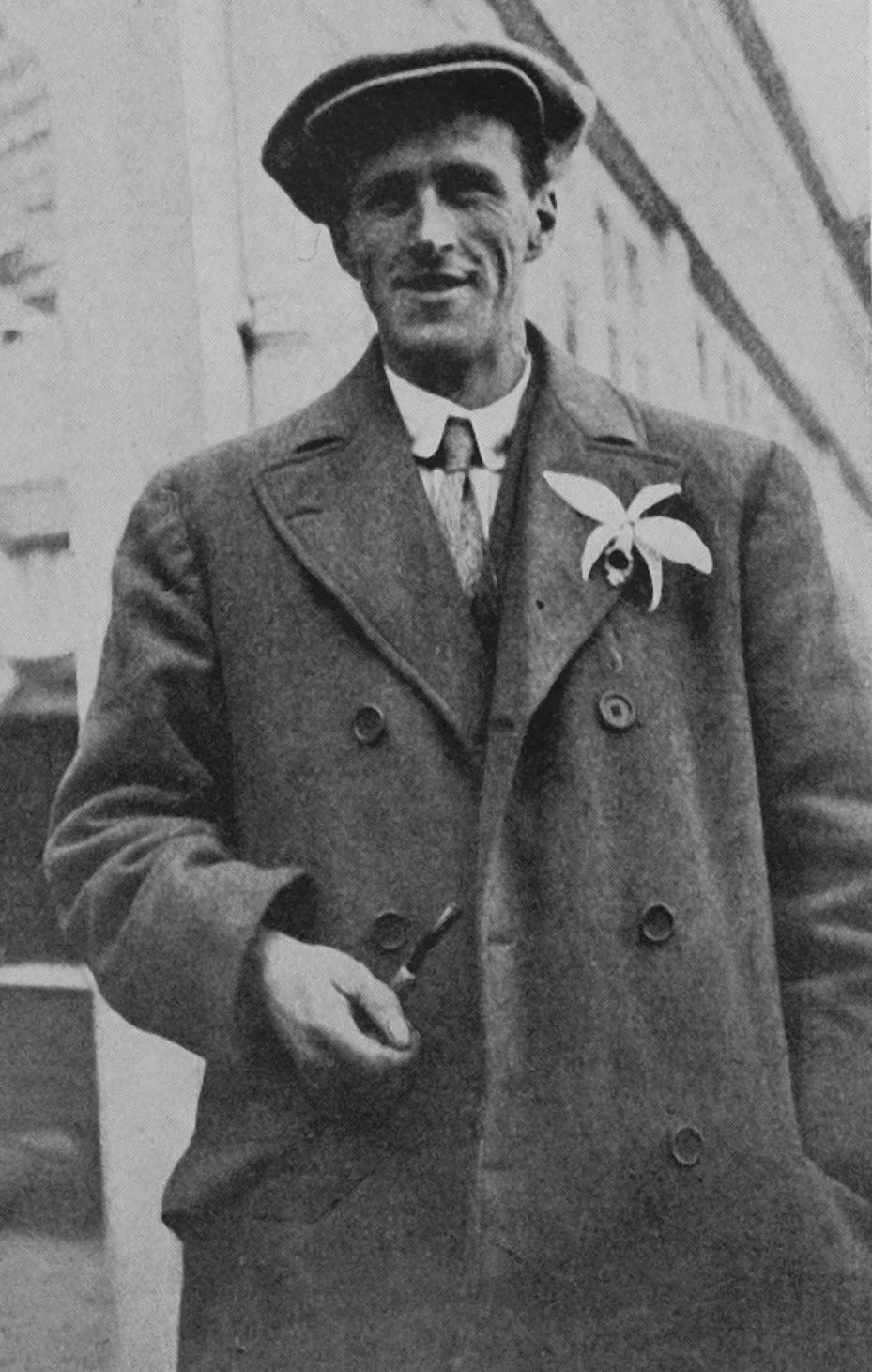
- Herbert Whitley
- Born: 1886
- Died: September 15, 1955 (aged 68–69)
- Occupations: Zookeeper, animal breeder
- Known for: Founding Paignton Zoo

Herbert Whitley (1886 – September 15, 1955) was an English animal breeder who had a passion for breeding animals and plants, especially those blue in colour. His interests spanned livestock, pigeons, dogs, and exotic animals, many of which he kept in a collection at his house on the Primley Estate in Paignton, Devon.

His breeding expertise won him many prizes, including for cattle, and his blue-coated greyhound, Primley Sceptre, was the first ever "best in show" winner at Crufts in 1928.

The size of his private collection led him to open to the public as Primley Zoological Gardens. He had repeated clashes with the Inland Revenue over his refusal to collect "entertainment tax" on tickets to the site, which he believed to be educational rather than an entertainment, and this twice led him to close the zoo to the public for extended periods. It finally reopened permanently after the Second World War, and became known as Paignton Zoo.

== Family background ==
Herbert was the fourth of five children of Edward Whitley, a prominent solicitor, Lord Mayor of Liverpool and Member of Parliament from Liverpool, and his wife Isabella Greenall, heiress in the Greenall Whitley & Co brewery dynasty. Greenall Whitley still survives as De Vere hotels, and dozens of pubs still bear the Whitley Greenall name. The inheritance from this meant that Whitley was independently wealthy and able to indulge his desires.

Following Edward's death, Isabella and four of her children moved to Devon, fearful of tuberculosis. Arriving in 1904, the brothers Herbert and William set about acquiring significant agricultural land holdings. It is thought that at its peak, you could walk from Haytor on Dartmoor to Slapton Ley without leaving Whitley land.

During this time, Herbert attended Cambridge University and studied agriculture.

The brothers were both keen fox hunters with the South Devon Hunt, and following the outbreak of World War I the Master, Major Cooke-Hurle was recalled to the army. As both brothers failed medicals for army service – Herbert on account of his poor eyesight – the brothers took joint mastership of the hunt. Herbert sent the hunt's horses to France for the war effort, and set about finding replacements. He used his extensive knowledge of animal breeding to improve the foxhound lines in the hunting pack.

Herbert's younger brother Charles was killed in 1917 during the Battle of Arras whilst serving with the King's Royal Rifle Corps, having been awarded the Military Cross the previous year for conspicuous gallantry.

Herbert remained joint master of the hunt until 1921, when he stepped back to concentrate on his collection of animals and plants at the Primley Estate in Paignton, although he continued to hunt with the pack.

== Breeding ==
Herbert's lifelong obsession was with the breeding of animals and plants – particularly trying to breed blue variants. This started with the gift of a pair of canaries from his mother, but his interests extended across livestock, dogs, and a wide range of other species.

=== Livestock ===
Herbert's breeding at Primley initially concentrated on breeding livestock, as part of the partnership with brother William. Early breeds included rare farm breeds such as Jacob sheep and Large Black pigs.

=== Paignton Zoo ===
The family home at the Primley Estate in Paignton was gradually filled with plants and animals collected and bred by Herbert, eventually expanding across the road from the original house and into land he owned on which he built various buildings to house his collections. Whilst these were initially common species, 1910 saw the arrival of the first monkeys, which started an expansion into an exotic collection. He acquired a number of exotics, including a chimpanzee called Bonny Mary, who appeared in the press as "the cleverest chimp in England". The chimp was trained to go to the village every morning to collect the milk, dressed as a milkmaid.

In July 1923, Herbert decided to open his collection to the public as "Primley Zoological Gardens". Employees of the Torquay Tramway Company were amongst the first to visit the site prior to its official opening.

In the month of opening, the park was visited by an officer of the Inland Revenue, who informed Herbert that he should be charging an 'amusement tax' on ticket sales. Whitley declined to do so, stating that his park was educational rather than entertainment. He was then summonsed to appear at court in Paignton, which happened on 21 March 1924, where the magistrates found in favour of the Inland Revenue.

Whitley immediately closed the park to the public, posting notices on the entrances, explaining the dispute and naming the justices involved in the case.

MR. HERBERT WHITLEY (the Owner) DOES NOT INTEND TO DEFRAUD THE PUBLIC BY CHARGING TAX WHERE NO ENTERTAINMENT EXISTS, AND CONSEQEUENTLY, WITH MUCH REGRET, HAS DECIDED TO CLOSE THE GROUNDS TO THE PUBLIC

Whitley continued to publicly feud with the revenue and magistrates, including raising a petition, and engaging in publicity denouncing the taxing. This led to replies in local press from the magistrates. Herbert had some history of clashing with authority, having fought the Paignton Urban District over his refusal to allow surveyors to access his land with a view to placing sewage and sanitation works, which he also lost at court and at appeal.

In 1927, Herbert agreed to reopen the zoo, and pay the contentious entertainment tax.

In 1934, the zoo opened a new "Tropical House", for which visitors had to pay an extra fee, and this once again attracted the attention of the Inland Revenue, who insisted that the tax be additionally paid on that fee. Whitley once again refused, and once again lost at court, closing the zoo for a second time in protest.

Herbert continued to collect and breed, along with his brother William. Around the outbreak of World War II, he was considering reducing his collection to just his extensive collection of pigeons. Both he and William were exempt war service on grounds of their health, and when Chessington Zoo needed to evacuate their animals, Herbert agreed to house them at Primley, and so ended up with a large collection. The relocation included not only animals, but a miniature railway and entire circus including the clowns and acrobats.

Whilst Herbert remained involved, Chessington's Reginald Goddard ran much of the operations, with a focus on entertainment and profit which had never been part of Whitley's style.

When Herbert Whitley died in 1955, the Herbert Whitley Trust, later the Whitley Wildlife Conservation Trust (WWCT) was set up to continue his work, and this was again renamed in 2019 as the Wild Planet Trust. The trust also owns and operates Newquay Zoo and previously also ran Living Coasts on Torquay seafront. His estates also included the site of several local nature reserves in Devon, including Slapton Ley, now also run by the WWCT.

=== Dog breeding ===
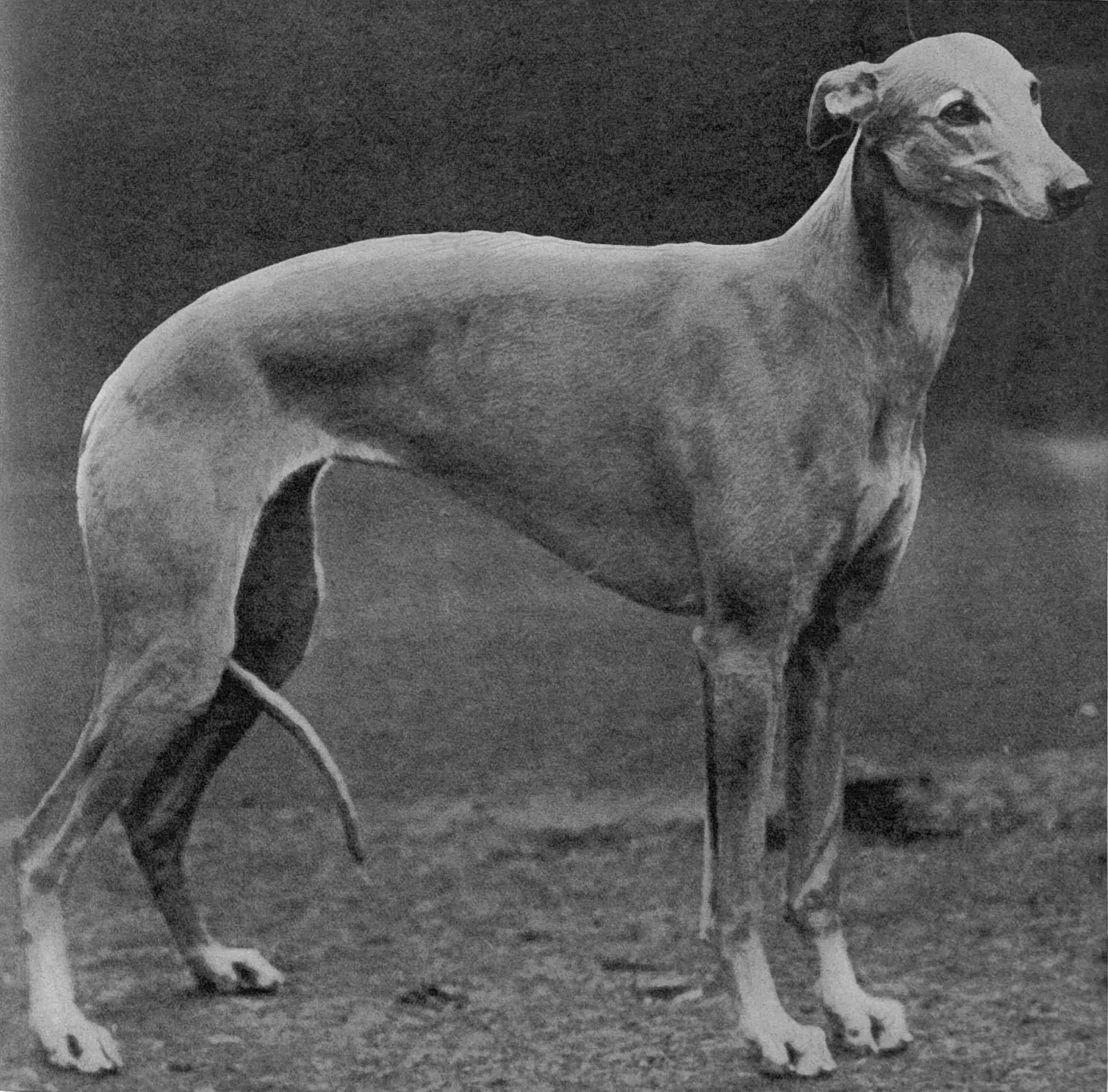
Primley Sceptre, winner of first best in show at Crufts

Whitley was keen on practical, working dogs, and bred dogs which were unpretentious and smooth coated. He disdained toy and heavy coated dogs as being impractical.

In 1928, Whitley's blue-coated greyhound bitch Primley Sceptre became the first dog to win 'Best in Show' at Crufts, from an entry of 9,466 competitors. At the same show, Whitley's greyhound dog, Primley Satyr, also took champion greyhound dog, whilst his English Setter, Primley Panda, was also breed champion.

He kept the setters as gun dogs, being a keen country sports enthusiast (and leading to his purchase of Slapton Ley in 1921 as an excellent spot for waterfowl hunting), and he kept a line of whippets to keep the rabbit population down on his estates. His kennel produced four champion Whippets in quick succession – Primley Pattern, Primley Raleigh, Priley Neattie, and Primley Niobe.

He also bred Great Danes amongst the other dogs, many of which were kept at Primley House and controlled the feral cat population. His most successful champion Great Dane was Primley Prodigal, who became champion in 1912.

Whitley was also instrumental in improving the foxhounds of the South Devon Hunt, both during his mastership and in the years after when his brother was master.

=== Livestock breeding ===
Herbert was a well known breeder of livestock, and continuing his blue theme, this included success with now critically-endangered Blue Albion cattle.

His cows won at the 1908 and 1909 Royal Milking Show trials.

Herbert's pigs took top prizes in the Royal Cornwall Show, Devon County Show and Bath and West Show in 1911. In 1920, he sold prize sow Primley Godiva for 65 guineas (nearly £4,000 in modern currency).

=== Pigeons ===
Herbert was a keen keeper of pigeons, and he had over 150 varieties in his pigeon loft at Primley, which may be the most varieties ever assembled in one collection, and which needed a full-time pigeon manager.

During World War II he contributed to the war effort by providing homing pigeons to be used as war pigeons with the Confidential Pigeon Service in the carriage of messages from Europe.

=== Other birds ===
From his original interest in animals from a gift of canaries, Herbert kept breeding birds throughout his life. This included the (blue) peacocks which still roam the grounds of the zoo.

He was also an officer of The Avicultural Society, and its proceedings note a wide range of breeds and crossbreeds that he kept, including Roulroul, Arabian Chukar, South American Rails, Southern Stone-curlew, crossbreed of Necklace and Senegal Dove, a number of Nyasa lovebird crossbreeds, Nanday parakeets, Lorikeets, and Myna birds.

He also kept large birds, including rheas, ostrich and cassowary.

=== Horses ===
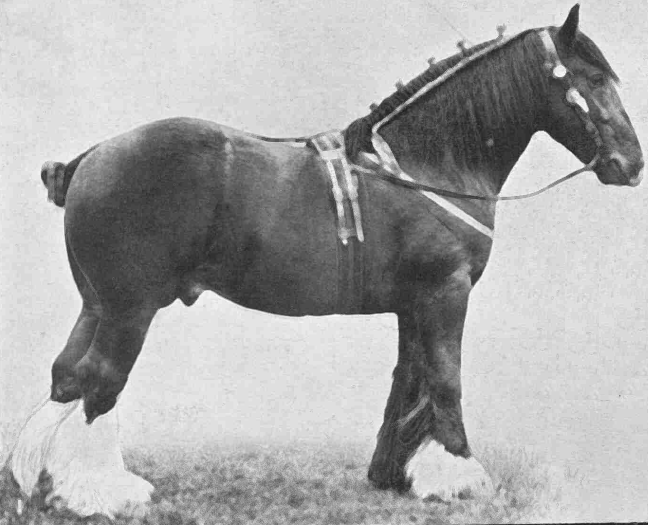
The shire horse Primley Bellivor, pictured winning at the Shire Horse Show at Islington in 1913, jointly owned by Herbert and brother William

Whitley was a keen rider, especially for fox hunting, and he maintained a horse stud nearby at Whitehill Farm around a mile from Primley House, at what is now Whitehill Country Park.

When a fire brigade was established locally, Herbert provided horses from his stud to pull the engines.

His horse breed interests were of all sizes, including Shetland ponies with his stallions such as Primley Quixote siring generations of ponies, through to shire horses where he purchased champion shire horse stallion Tatton Dray King to breed from, and also had his own string of shire stallions such as Primley Bellivor which won at the Bath and West Show in 1911 and the Shire Horse Show at Islington in 1913.

=== Plants ===
Whitley filled the greenhouses at Primley with varieties of plants, and ran a successful propagation business. He donated plants to the gardens at Roundham Head.

He created a range of cultivars – particularly in a blue colour, and named Primley Blue – although some have now been lost. This included breeds of mallow, rosemary, and hebe.

The Royal Horticultural Society still lists a number of 'Primley Blue' cultivars in their catalogue, including:

- Malva sylvestris 'Primley Blue'
- Salvia rosmarinus 'Primley Blue'
- Rosmarinus officinalis 'Primley Blue'

== Slapton Ley ==
In 1921, Slapton Ley, a unique freshwater lake separated from the sea by a glacial shingle bank, was at threat of being drained and developed as a holiday resort, and Herbert stepped in to purchase the land. This was due to twin interests in both helping to preserve it, and because of the quality of its waterfowl hunting.

The lake is the largest natural freshwater lake in the South West, and is a Site of Special Scientific Interest and a designated National Nature Reserve. The ley passed to the Herbert Whitley Trust on his death, and is still owned by the successor Wild Planet Trust, under the management of the Field Studies Council

== Personal life ==
Whitley was a lifelong bachelor, said to be 'terrified' of women. His closest aide, however, was Gladys Salter who worked for him for over 40 years, including nursing him as his health declined in later life. On his death, she received a considerable sum from his fortune, as well as the use of a large section of Primley House which she lived in until her death in 1978.

He was a private man, and chain smoker. He was often reclusive, to the point of hiding in the lofts of the house when visitors came, and only emerging once they had left. He was accustomed to sleeping in chair, rather than in bed.

Whitley used his wealth to be an early car owner, and his Austro-Daimler 27/80 Prince Henry was one of only around 50 built, and following its sale by the estate following his death, it later appeared in the film Chitty Chitty Bang Bang as Lord Scrumptious' car.

Whilst he kept extensive notes of his work in breeding, he requested that these be destroyed upon his death.

At his death, he left the zoo and estate to a trust called the "Herbert Whitley Trust", to be managed by friend and entomologist Alfred Michelmore (son of a renowned local solicitor). Michelmore resigned his job with the Colonial Office to take up the full-time role running the estate.

Whitley is buried in the Whitley family plot at Buckland-in-the-Moor.
