= Primley Sceptre =

First 'Best in Show' winner at Crufts dog show

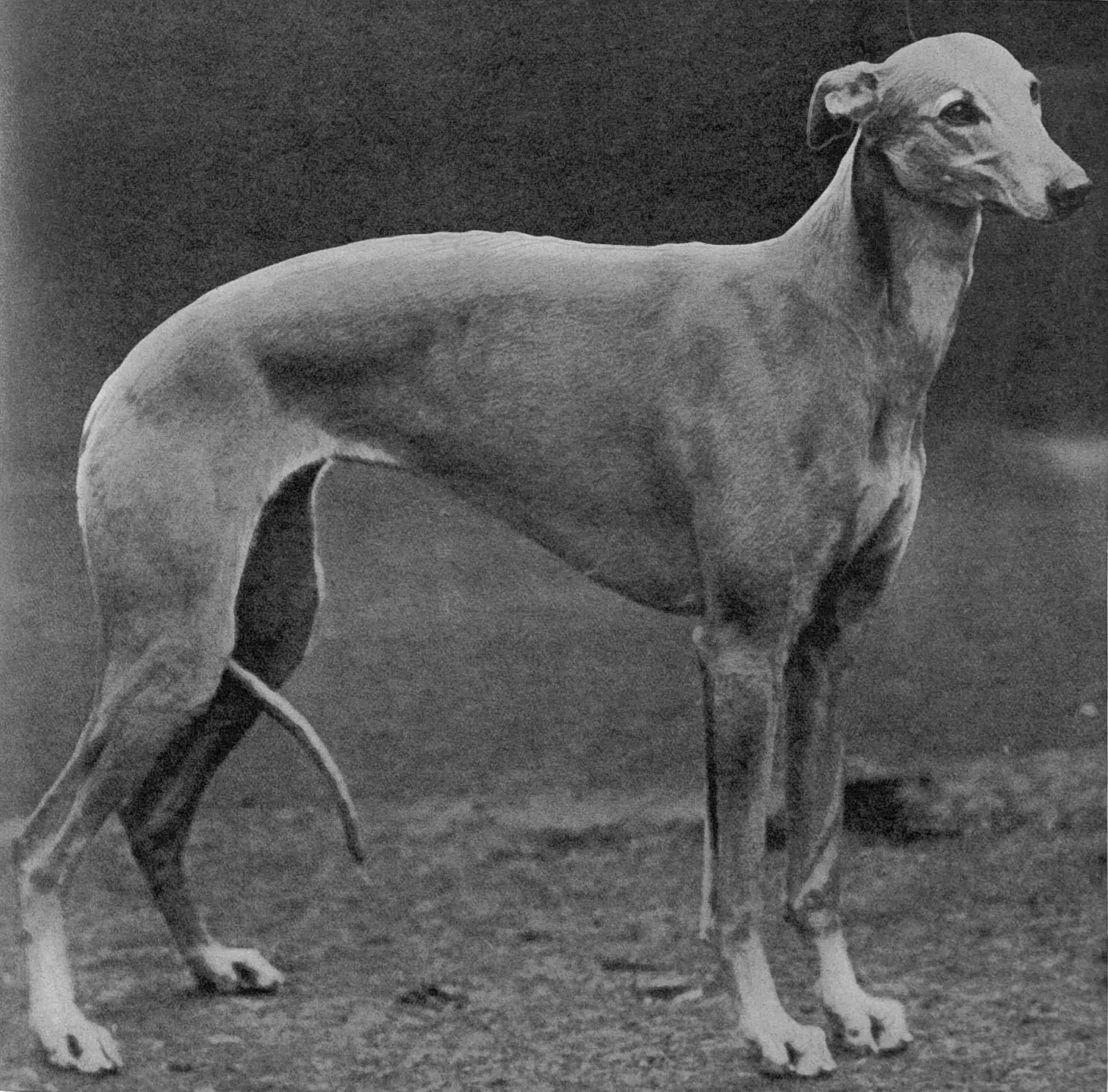
- Photograph of Primley Sceptre
- Species: Dog
- Breed: Greyhound
- Sex: Bitch
- Nationality: United Kingdom
- Occupation: Racing greyhound, Show dog
- Title: Best In Show at Crufts
- Term: 1928
- Predecessor: None (first winner)
- Successor: Heather Necessity (Scottish Terrier)
- Owner: Herbert Whitley
- Parent: Sire Ch. King of Venton

Primley Sceptre was a greyhound bitch who was the first winner of 'Best in Show' at Crufts in 1928. Primley Sceptre was owned by eccentric zoo owner Herbert Whitley, an expert breeder of a huge range of animals, and a particular fascination with breeding animals which were blue in colour. He usually prefixed things he bred (both animal and plant) with 'Primley' after his home at Primley House, the grounds of which now form Paignton Zoo.

== Description ==
Primley Sceptre was a blue-coated greyhound bitch, part of Whitley's obsession with breeding plants and animals with a blue colour. Her sire was Ch. King of Venton.

She was known to have raced and won a stake, as she was entered as a 'track greyhound'.

Her litter brother, Primley Splinter was a stud dog.

== Crufts 1928 ==
Primley Sceptre was selected as best bitch, although was beaten in the breed championship by kennel-mate best greyhound dog Primley Satyr. The pair together won "best brace". She was then picked as Best of Show from an entry of 9,466 competitors by renowned judge, Theo Marples. At the same show, Whitley also took breed champion for English Setter Primley Panda.

During the judging she was described as "the best bitch ever benched" and "faultless".

Whitley was presented with a sterling silver, gold gilt bowl, which took pride of place displayed at home at Primley House.

Whilst winning Best in Show, she missed out on the Hound International Challenge Bowl (won by Irish Wolfhound Lady of Raikeshill) and the Petanelle Challenge Cup for best conditioned dog in show.

== History following Crufts ==
After the win at Crufts, Primley Sceptre was never shown again, and died young of jaundice, and never became a Champion dog.

Primley Sceptre was the first of only three greyhounds to ever win at Crufts.
