= Primley House =

House in England

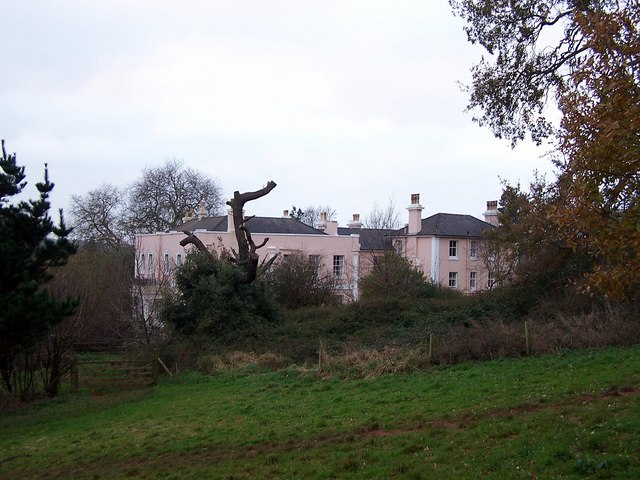
- Primley House from within the grounds
- Interactive map of the Primley House area

General information
- Coordinates: 50.430806°N 3.581670°W
- Year built: 1709
- Owner: Belfield Family (1709–1870); Herbert Whitley (1904–1955)

Website
- www.primleyhouse.co.uk

Primley House is a large estate house in Paignton, Devon. Built in the 18th century by the Belfield family, it stayed in family hands until the early 20th century when it was sold to the Whitley family. Herbert Whitley spent considerable time and effort growing a collection of animals and plants in the extensive outbuildings of the house, before extending his collection onto estate land on the other side of the Totnes Road. That collection was eventually opened to the public and became Paignton Zoo.

On Whitley's death, the house was left to his assistant Gladys Salter, who converted it to a home for the elderly, which it remains to the present day.

== History ==
=== Early history ===
The house was originally named Prim-Legh, based on the Old English for "morning meadow".

Little is known about the early history, although by 1709 a John Elliot was paying rates for the house (while a Mr Furneaux paid rates for 'Primley Garden').

=== Belfield ownership ===
At the beginning of the 18th century, the estate was acquired through marriage by the Bellfield family, whose predecessors had moved to Paignton from Lancashire in 1554.

The family held the estate through a number of generations.

The Belfields were active in the community, including providing land from the estate for local allotments.

During the 1870s, the house formed the boundary of the foot messengers from Paighton for the General Post Office telegraph service.

The final Belfield in residence was John Finney Belfield, who left abruptly in 1870, simply walking out of the house, and away from his prominent profile in Paignton, and moved unannounced to Exeter, never returning to the town.

After the Belfields, the house was lived in by a number of short-term occupants, including Mr H Twiddle, and Lord and Lady Wenlock.

=== Whitley family ===
The Whitley family were wealthy and prominent in Liverpool. The then-head of the household, Edward Whitley, a prominent solicitor, Lord Mayor of Liverpool and Member of Parliament from Liverpool, died in 1892, leaving his wife Isabella Greenall, heiress in the Greenall Whitley & Co brewery dynasty and five children.

In 1904 Isabella and four of the children moved to Devon, fearful of tuberculosis. The brothers Herbert and William completed their studies before setting about acquiring significant land in Devon, both at Paignton and around Dartmoor.

Herbert Whitley was the fourth son, but he took much control of Primley House, in particular taking over the sixteen large greenhouses adjoining the house, filling them with a wide variety of exotic plants and animals, with a particular interest in specimens which were blue.

His collection eventually outgrew the greenhouses, and he started building on estate land on the far side of the Totnes Road. This collection became larger and more exotic, before being opened to the public as Primley Zoological Gardens, and later known as Paignton Zoo.

=== Home for the elderly ===
When Herbert Whitley died in 1955, he made provision that his trusted assistant Gladys Salter should have a lifetime interest in Primley House, being able to live out her days there. She converted the entire house to a home for the elderly – including provision for herself, and in 1956 this became the Primley Housing Association.

In 1967 the association purchased the freehold of the house from the Whitley Trust.

In 1986 the Torbay Civic Society unveiled a blue plaque on the building, commemorating both the Belfield family and Herbert Whitley.

Notable residents have included Bill Stone, the noted Royal Navy sailor.

== Status ==
Primley House has been a listed building at Grade II since 1975.
