= Living Coasts =

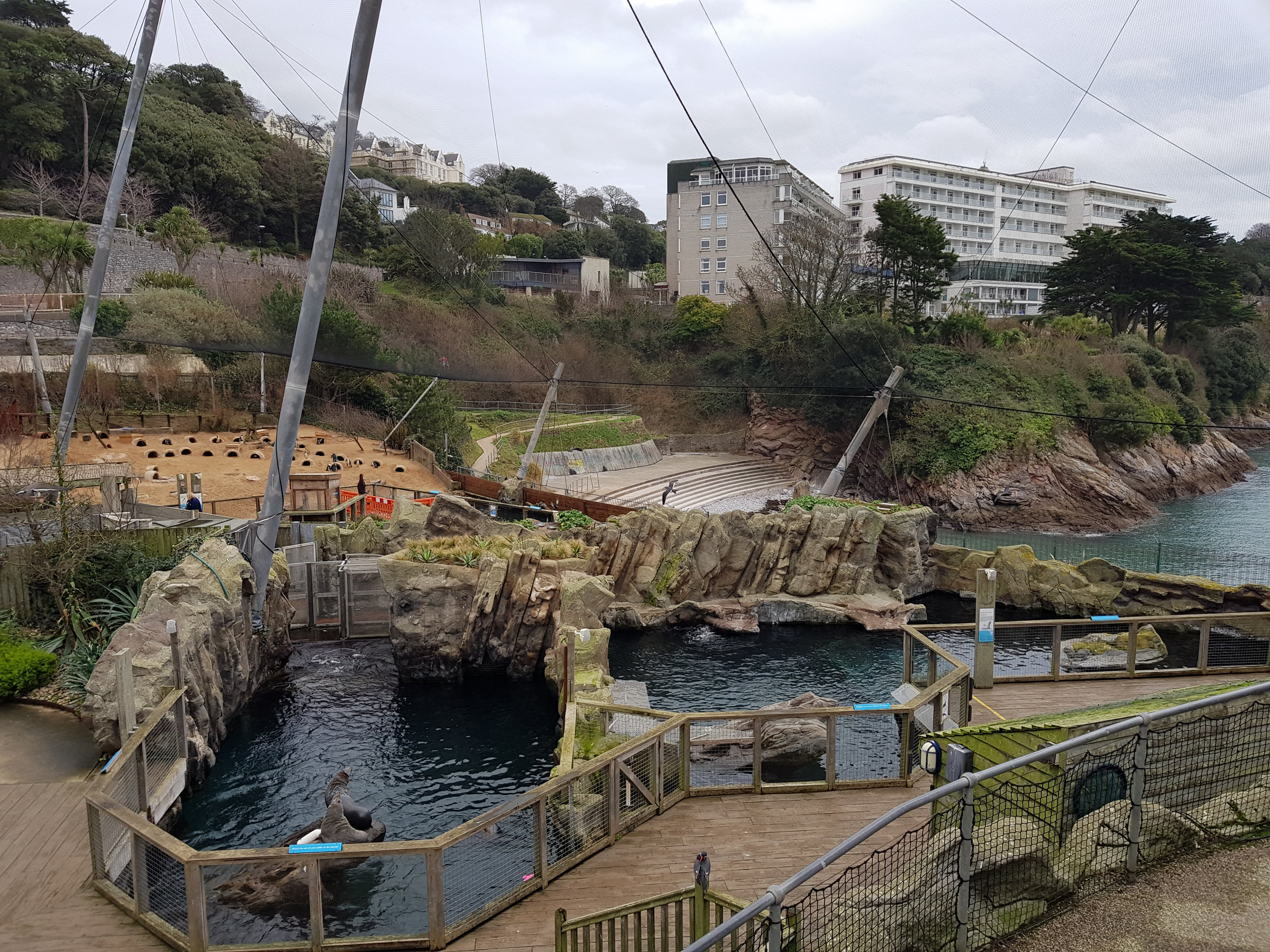
- Interactive map of Living Coasts
- 50.458°N 3.525°W
- Date opened: 14 July 2003
- Date closed: 16 June 2020
- Location: Torquay, Devon, England
- No. of animals: Over 600
- No. of species: Over 50
- Annual visitors: 100,000+
- Memberships: BIAZA, EAZA, WAZA
- Major exhibits: Auk Cliff, Penguin Beach, Underwater Tunnel, Mangroves: The Roots of the Sea, Local Coasts, Discover Zone
- Owner: Wild Planet Trust
- Website: www.livingcoasts.org.uk

Living Coasts was a coastal zoo at the site of Torquay Marine Spa in Devon, England. It was owned by South West Environmental Parks as part of the Wild Planet Trust, formerly known as Whitley Wildlife Conservation Trust, which also operates Newquay Zoo and Paignton Zoo. It was a registered charity, based around seabirds and other coastal wildlife. The site had a covered giant aviary which included several animal enclosures and habitats including an artificial tidal estuary, a penguin beach, a tropical mangrove swamp, and underwater viewing areas.

Living Coasts was also home to the oldest African penguin in the UK, named Pat, before he was euthanized in 2015 at the age of 37.

Living Coasts was Britain's first and only coastal zoo. It was a member of the British and Irish Association of Zoos and Aquariums (BIAZA), the European Association of Zoos and Aquaria (EAZA), and the World Association of Zoos and Aquariums (WAZA).

On 16 June 2020, Living Coasts announced it would not reopen following its closure during the COVID-19 pandemic.

Some of the species the zoo had included common cuttlefish, octopus, penguins, seals, otter, atlantic mudskipper, puffin, inca tern, common tern, seahorses, black necked stilt, starfish, kittiwake, ray, jellyfish, common redshank, pufferfish, pied avocet, pigeon guillemots, common guillemots, crabs, ruffs, red lionfish, lobster, banded archerfish, Scatophagus argus, mullet, Barrow's goldeneye, bank cormorant, common murre, anemone, beetles, tompot blenny, chough, orange chromide, shore clingfish, death head cockroach, leopard gecko, goby, stick insect, silver moony, oyster catcher, pipefish, sea urchins, blue baboon spider, corkwing wrasse, longtailed duck, bristletail filefish, bearded reedling, wolffish, blacktailed godwit, black rat, and scoter.

== History ==
Living Coasts opened to the public on 14 July 2003, built on the site of the former Torquay Marine Spa. As of 2011 was being visited by over 100,000 visitors a year. It officially closed in June 2020, following significant loss of income caused by the COVID-19 pandemic crisis.

== Aviary ==
The aviary was 19 metres (62 ft) at its highest point and had a total volume of 1.8 million cubic feet (51,000 m^{3}). This free flying enclosure was home to mammals and birds including South American fur seals, African penguins, macaroni penguins, sea ducks, pied avocet, redshanks, black-necked stilts, ruffs, and terns.

The aviary was the first open-air auk exhibit in the world, and won a design award. It was also the first place in the U.K to breed pigeon guillemots, common guillemots and tufted puffins. Also found in the auk enclosure were red legged kittiwakes and red billed choughs.

== Other exhibits ==
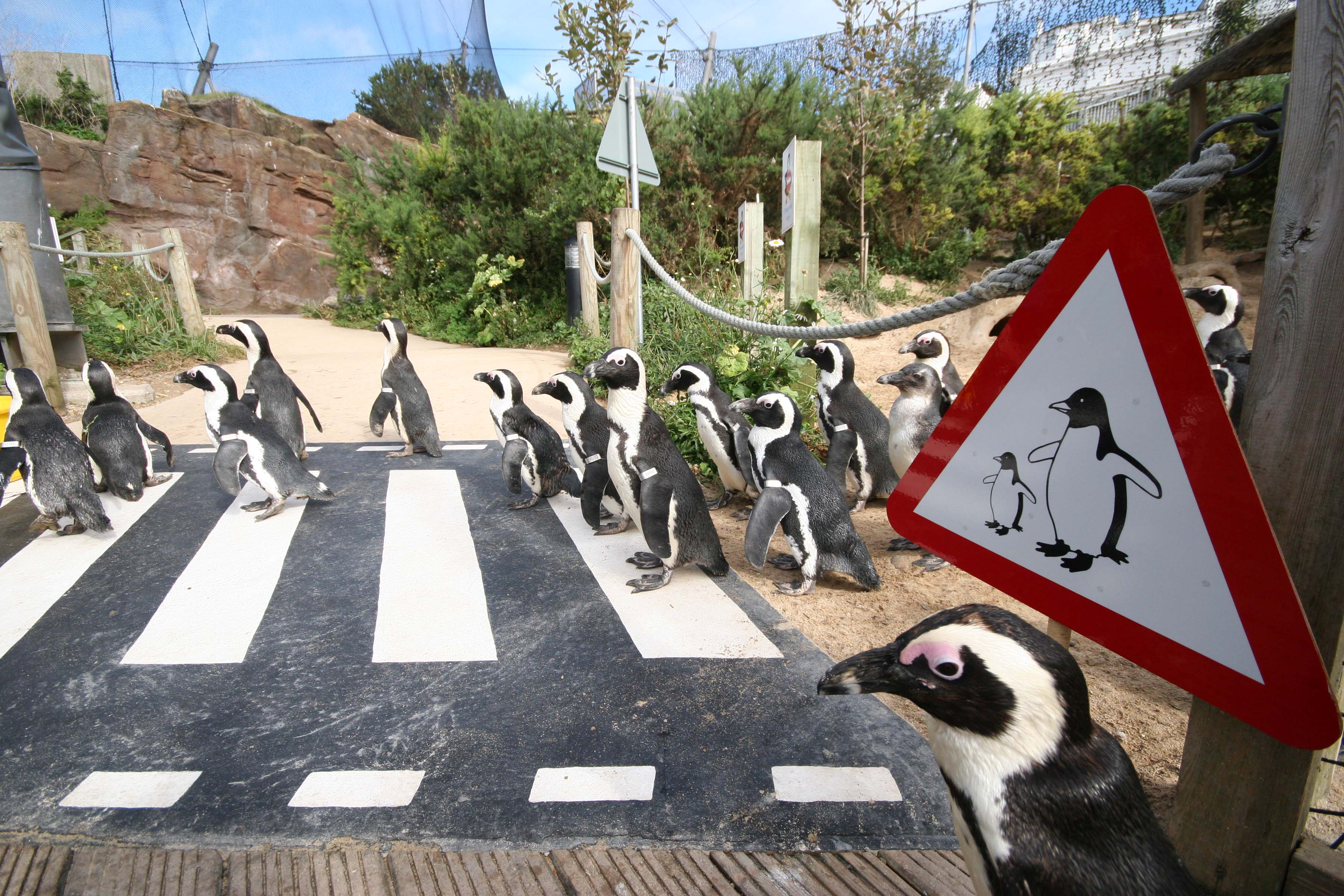
The Penguin Crossing

Aquarium tanks inside the aviary had a total capacity of 1,214 cubic metres (321,000 US gal).

- Mangroves: The Roots of the Sea opened in July 2009, and featured large aquarium tanks containing over 20 species. including three types of sting ray. It is Britain's first major exhibit themed on a mangrove swamp habitat.
- The Local Coasts exhibit was themed on the underside of a classic English pier and home to native marine species including seahorses, starfish, edible crabs etc.
- Discovery Zone, which opened in March 2008, featured an interactive floor with a series of specially-created penguin computer game stations called Penguin Academy.

== Programs ==
Special shows, extended talks and hands-on events were available throughout the site each day. Other programs let visitors be keeper or junior keeper for the day, take part in one of the penguin feeds, or (for certified SCUBA divers) take a 45-minute swim with the penguins.

== Facilities ==
Living Coasts had a cafe that overlooked Torbay and the Tradewinds gift shop, themed on a colonial harbour. Both facilities were open to visitors and non-visitors.

== Closure ==
On 23 March 2020, Living Coasts, along with other visitor attractions nationwide, temporarily closed during the COVID-19 pandemic and consequent lockdown. On 11 June, the House of Commons debated the reopening of zoos amid mounting concerns that many could face permanent closure without visitor revenue. On 15 June, the Government announced zoos could re-open to the public with strict social distancing rules in place, however Living Coasts remained closed. On 16 June, Wild Planet Trust announced the permanent closure of Living Coasts due to its costbase, need to make efficiencies and inability to afford required substantial maintenance. Homes were sought for the zoo's animals. Despite euthanasia fears, on 19 June 2020 it was then announced that homes had been found for all animals.
