= Paignton Zoo =

Zoo in Devon, England

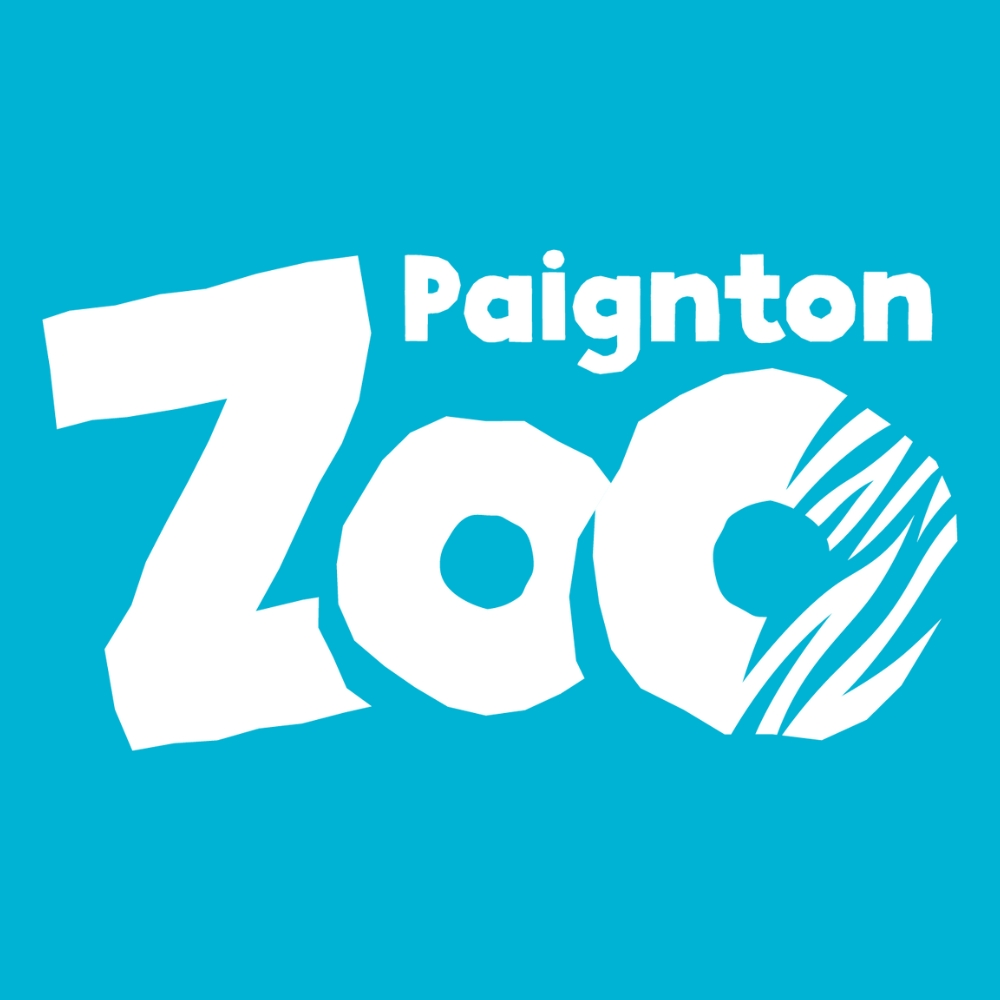
- Paignton Zoo logo 2026

- Sign on the main entrance to Paignton Zoo
- Interactive map of Paignton Zoo
- 50°25′44″N 3°35′4″W
- Date opened: 1923
- Location: Paignton, Devon, England
- Land area: 80 acres (32 ha)
- No. of animals: 1,876
- No. of species: 189
- Major exhibits: Tropical Trails, Arid Lands, Crocodile Swamp, Avian Breeding Centre, Ape Centre, Lemur Wood, Monkey Heights, Bugs at Home
- Website: www.paigntonzoo.org.uk

Paignton Zoo is a zoo in Paignton, Devon, England, housing a collection of approximately 1,876 animals representing nearly 189 species, and cultivates about 1,600 different species of plant across its 80-acre site.

Originally established as a private collection by Herbert Whitley in the grounds of his home Primley House, the zoo opened to the public in 1923 as Primley Zoological Gardens. Following Whitley's death in 1955, the zoo was placed into a charitable trust, which later became the Wild Planet Trust. Following financial difficulties, the zoo was sold to Dutch leisure company Libéma.

Paignton Zoo is a member of the British and Irish Association of Zoos and Aquariums, the European Association of Zoos and Aquaria – holding the vice-chair position until 2025 – and the World Association of Zoos and Aquariums.

== Animals and plants ==
=== Animals ===
As of January 2026, Paignton Zoo maintains a collection of roughly 1,876 animals representing around 189 species throughout its 80-acre site.

The zoo participates in numerous European Endangered Species Programmes (EEPs) and manages the international studbooks for several species, including the Southern cassowary and Sulawesi crested macaque, a Critically Endangered species.

==== Notable species ====
Western lowland gorilla at Paignton Zoo

Paignton Zoo is the only zoo in the United Kingdom to house a northern brown kiwi and a short-beaked echidna.

The collection includes eleven Critically Endangered species: Sumatran tiger, western lowland gorilla, Bornean orangutan, eastern mountain bongo, Lesser Antillean iguana, Annam leaf turtle, brown spider monkey, red ruffed lemur, red-necked ostrich, Sulawesi crested macaque, and the Socorro dove, which is extinct in the wild.

Popular residents include Rothschild's giraffes, Linné's two-toed sloths, a secretarybird, Chilean flamingos, a Cuban crocodile, African lions, and red pandas. The zoo's lar gibbons and pileated gibbons are housed on an island in the main lake, providing a distinctive exhibit visible throughout the site.

==== Conservation breeding achievements ====
Paignton Zoo has achieved notable success in breeding threatened species. In 2024, the zoo successfully hand-reared a pink pigeon squab for the first time, using an innovative technique developed by bird keeper Tom Tooley. Pink pigeons, endemic to Mauritius, were once on the brink of extinction with wild numbers thought to have been as low as nine individuals in 1991. The zoo's participation in the pink pigeon EEP, alongside collaboration with the Mauritian Wildlife Foundation, has contributed to the species' recovery. Tooley has travelled to Mauritius on multiple occasions to train local staff in his specialized hand-rearing method, which uses a catheter and syringe system rather than conventional crop tubing.

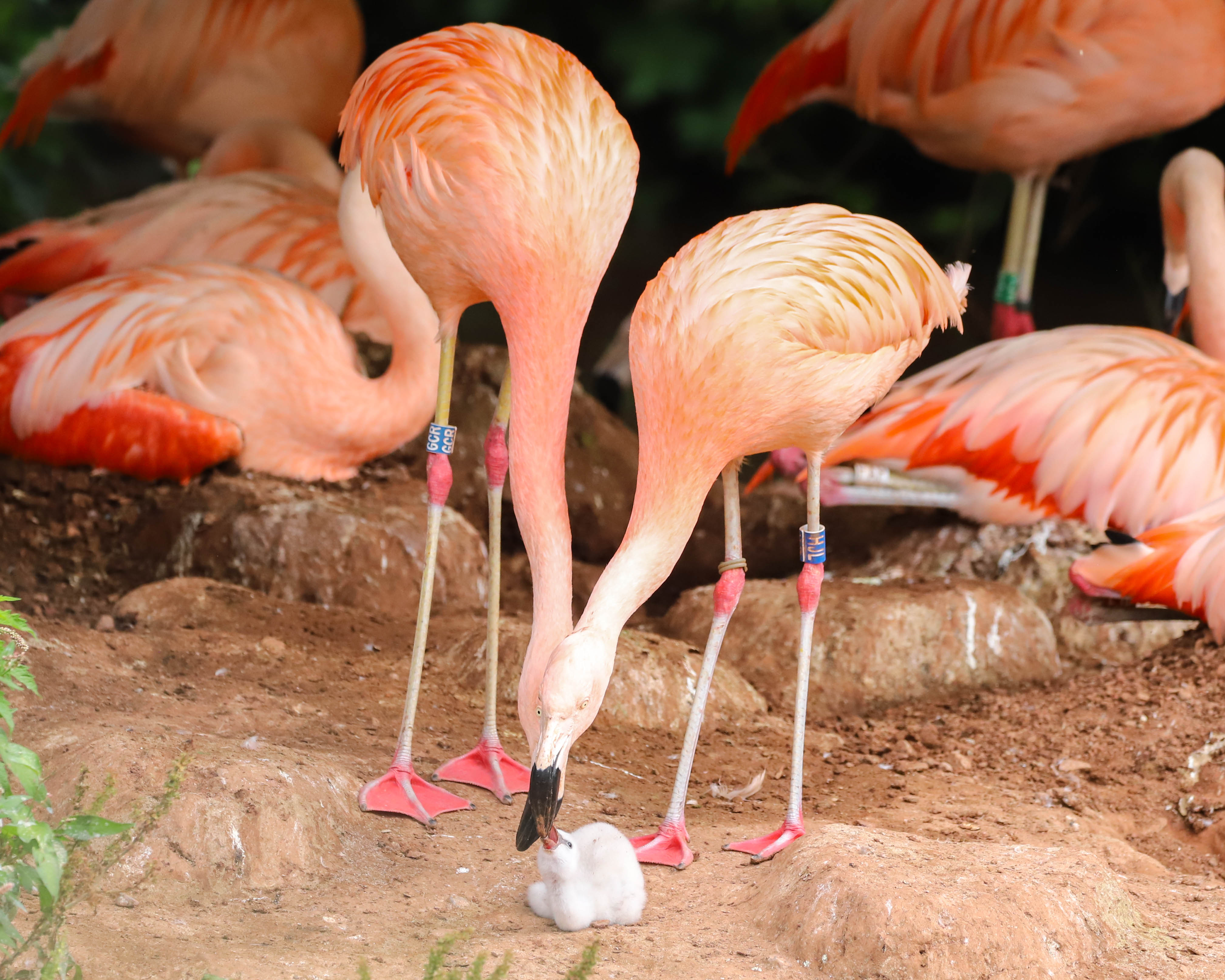
Same sex pair of Chilean flamingos raising their chick at Paignton Zoo in 2024

Other breeding successes in 2024 included the hatching of several Chilean flamingo chicks, including one raised by a same-sex pair, and the successful fledging of a Socorro dove, a species extinct in the wild.

In 2025, the zoo achieved their first successful breeding of southern cassowary since 2004, and the only cassowary birth in Europe that year, following the successful introduction of 16-year-old male Madrid and 11-year-old female Twiggy in May 2025.

A pregnant Diana monkey who had been diagnosed with an ovarian tumour during pregnancy successfully gave birth to a healthy infant in April 2025. The zoo described managing the pregnancy as a "delicate balancing act of nature and medical intervention".

A king colobus monkey was born in October 2025. The birth followed an extensive four-year international search to find a suitable male, making Paignton one of only 13 collections across the UK and Europe to house this increasingly endangered species.

Two maned wolf pups were born in November 2025 to parents Tolock and Lua.

=== Botanical gardens ===
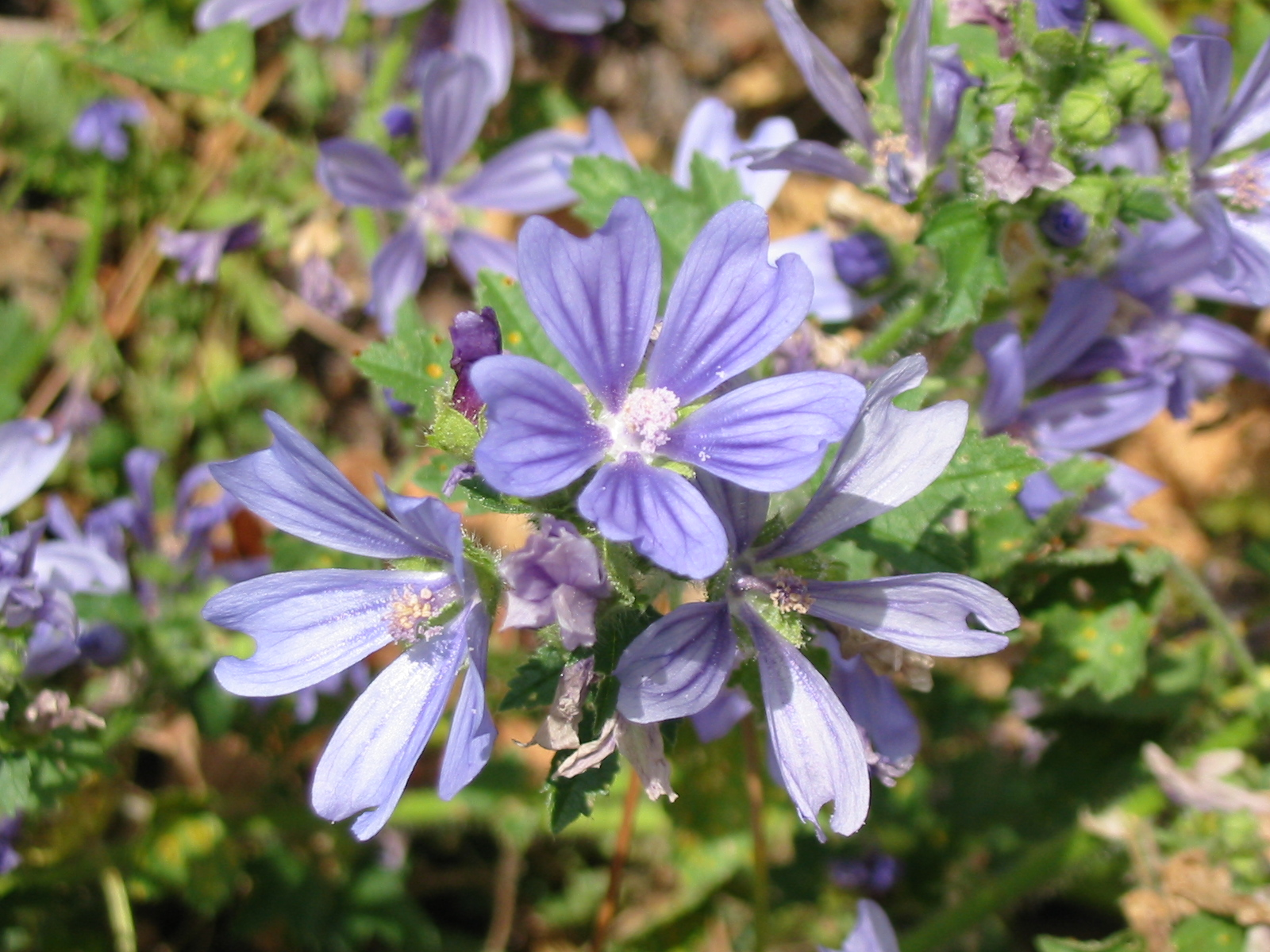
Malva sylvestris 'Primley Blue' was cultivated by zoo founder Herbert Whitley

==== Historical precedent ====
From its earliest years, the zoo has been managed as both a zoological and horticultural landscape, with planting schemes designed to support animal welfare, recreate natural habitats, and enhance the visitor experience. Founder Herbert Whitley was an enthusiastic horticulturist who cultivated rare and exotic plants, including several blue‑flowered varieties such as the mallow Malva sylvestris 'Primley Blue'.

Succulents on display in Paignton Zoo's desert house

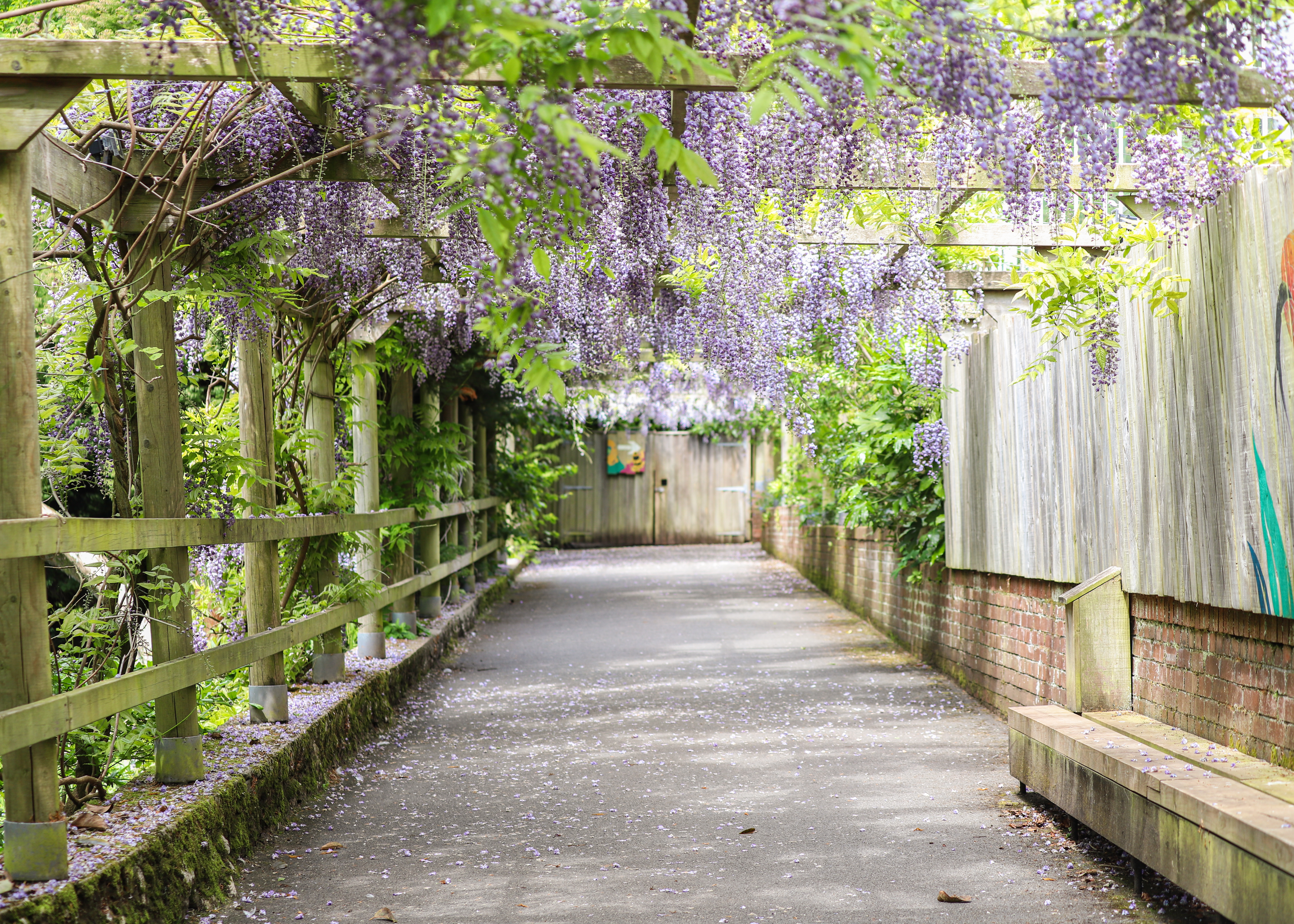
Seasonal display of wisteria at Paignton Zoo

==== Horticultural displays ====
Paignton Zoo cultivates approximately 1,600 species of plants throughout its 80-acre site, combining horticultural display with conservation priorities, habitat creation, and animal welfare, with plants arranged to recreate authentic natural environments for both animals and visitors.

The zoo's horticulture team maintains year-round planting programmes, with seasonal highlights including magnolia (Magnolia spp.) and blossom trees in spring, hibiscus (Hibiscus spp.) in the tropical houses, and Japanese maples providing autumn colour.

==== Browse production ====
Many plants are cultivated specifically to provide food and enrichment for the zoo's animal collection. Winter supplies include cotoneaster (Cotoneaster spp.), hazel (Corylus avellana), hawthorn (Crataegus monogyna), and lacebark trees (Hoheria sexstylosa), with seasonal rotation to sycamore and other deciduous species. The programme reduces the zoo's carbon footprint whilst providing nutritional benefits and natural foraging enrichment for species ranging from gorillas to giraffes and bongo antelope.

In 2009, Paignton Zoo installed Europe’s first VertiCrop vertical growing system to produce browse using hydroponic technology. Although no longer in use, the project marked a notable innovation in sustainable horticulture.

==== Conservation and collaboration ====
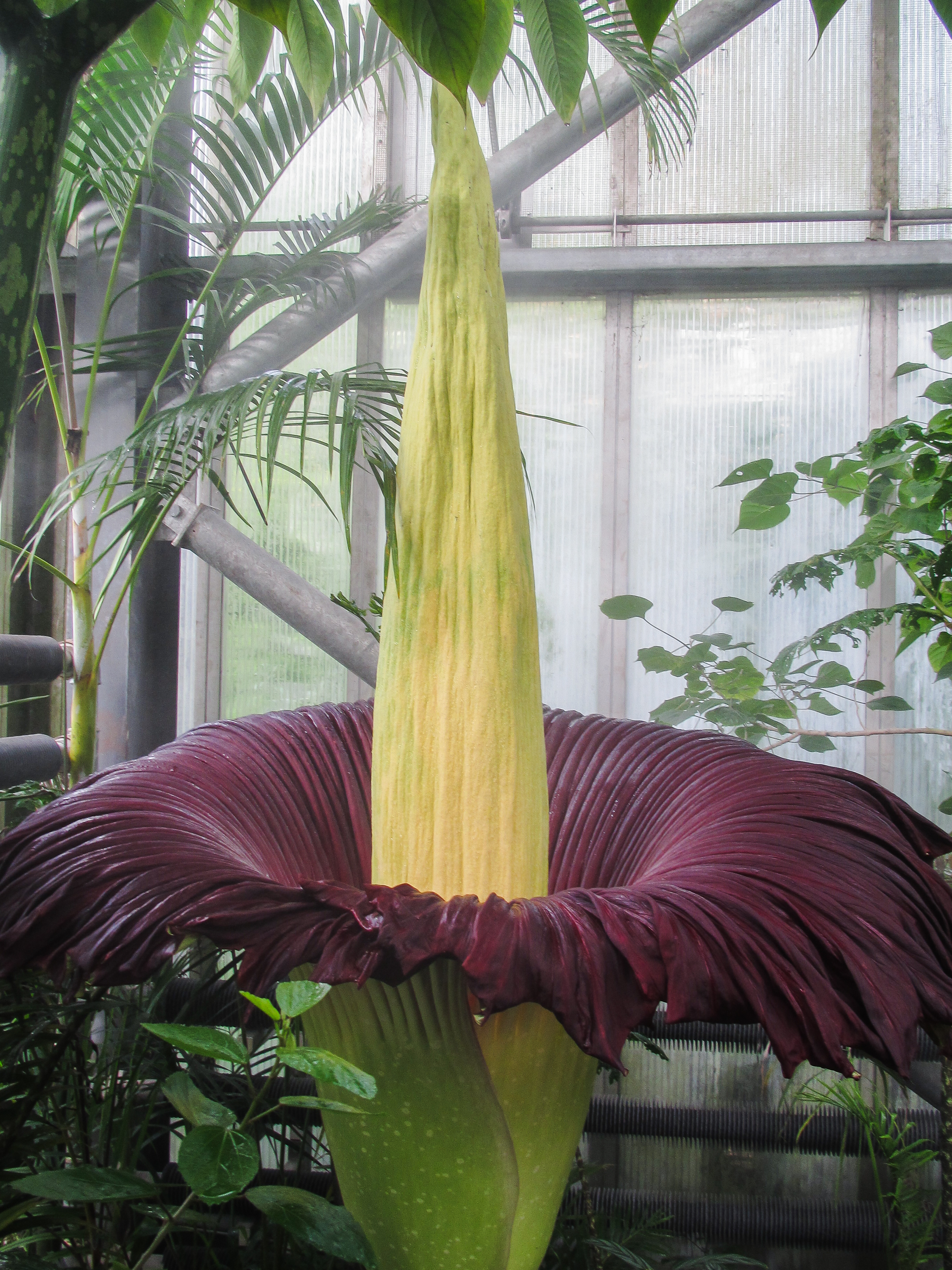
Titan arum bloom at Paignton Zoo 2018

The botanical collection plays an active role in plant conservation, with the zoo cultivating numerous endangered species including the paperbark maple (Acer griseum), which faces challenges in the wild due to poor seed viability. The zoo participates in material exchange and technique-sharing programmes with other botanical gardens worldwide. Indoor greenhouses and propagation areas support both conservation breeding programmes and display specimens.

Notable species in the collection include critically endangered cacti in the desert house, alongside impressive specimens such as titan arum (Amorphophallus titanum), giant bamboo, and giant water lilies in the tropical houses. In 2025, the zoo donated titan arum specimens to the Royal Botanic Gardens, Kew.

The gardens won Gold awards in the Britain in Bloom competition in both 2024 and 2025, gaining national recognition as an attraction in their own right.

== History ==
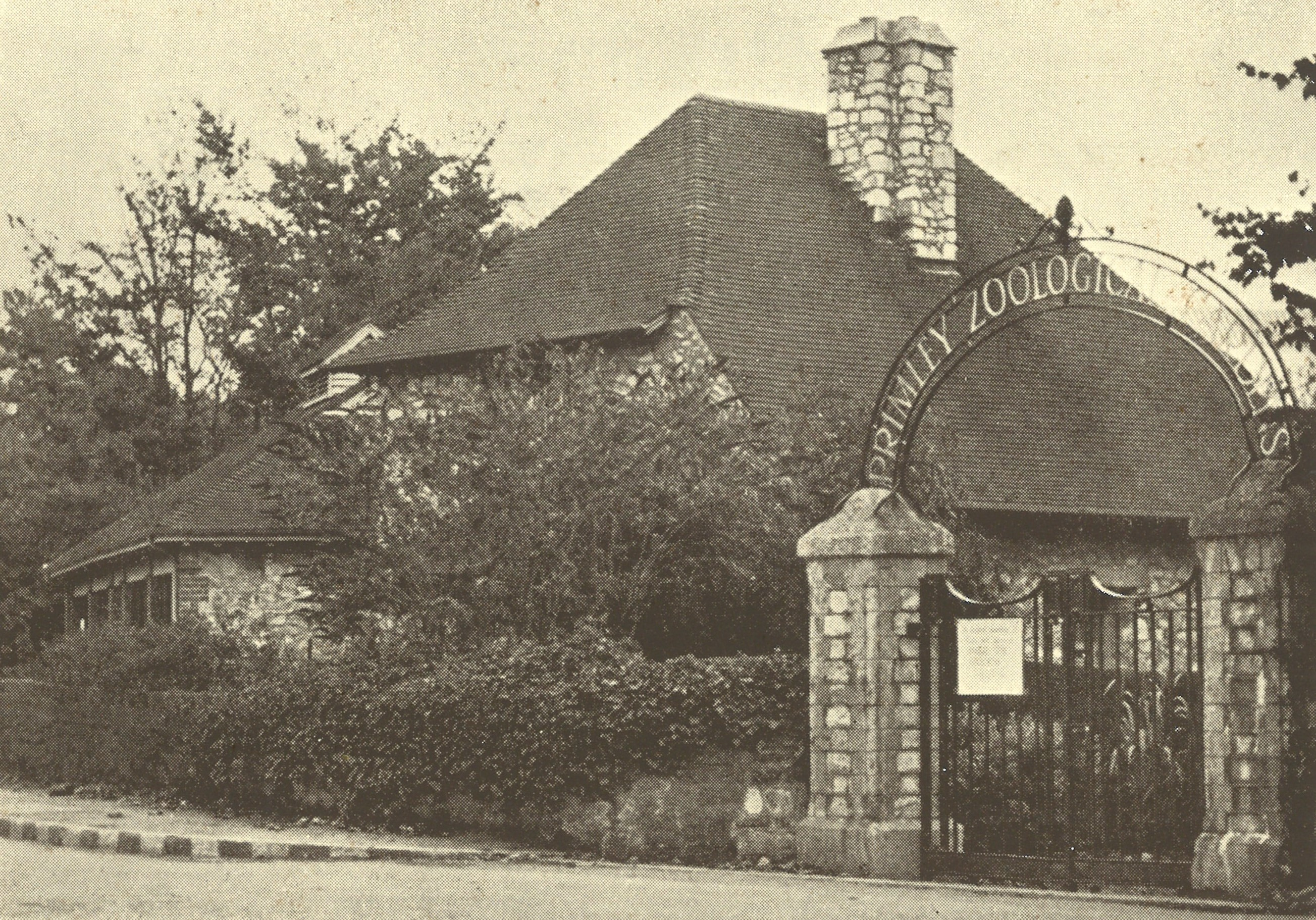
Entrance building to Primley Zoological Gardens on Totnes Road, Paignton

=== Primley Zoological Gardens ===
Paignton Zoo originated from the private animal collection of Herbert Whitley, a wealthy breeder based at Primley House in Devon. Whitley amassed a wide range of species, including exotic animals, which eventually formed the basis of his public zoological gardens.

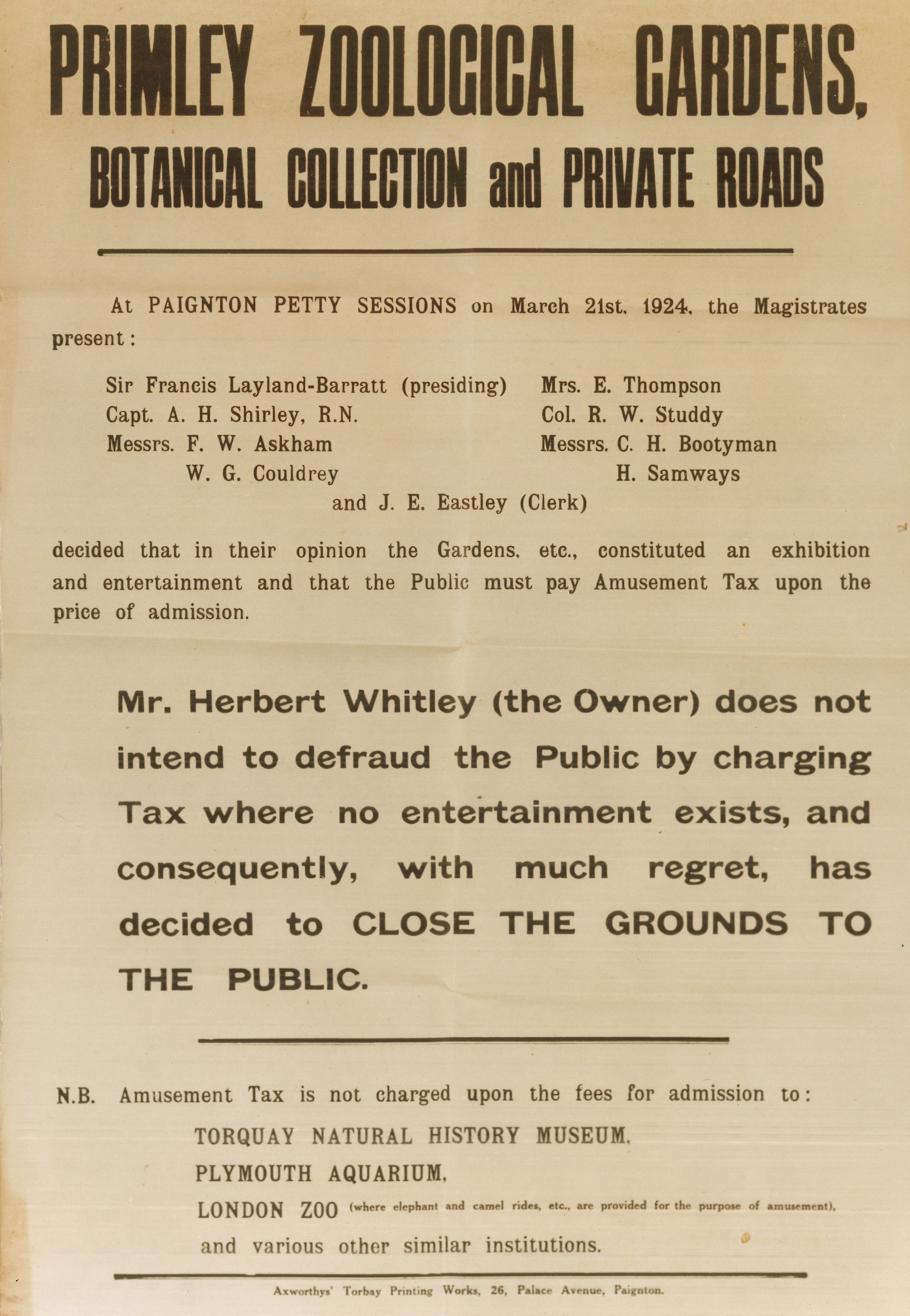
Notice detailing Whitley's decision to close the zoo in 1924

Whitley first opened his collection to the public on 1 July 1923 as Primley Zoological Gardens. Soon after, a dispute with the Inland Revenue over the "amusement tax" (a stamp duty payable under the Finance (New Duties) Act 1916) led him to close the site in protest. He re-opened in June 1927 after agreeing to pay the tax, but a similar disagreement in 1934 over an additional fee for the new Tropical House resulted in a second closure in 1937.

=== Devon Zoo and Circus ===
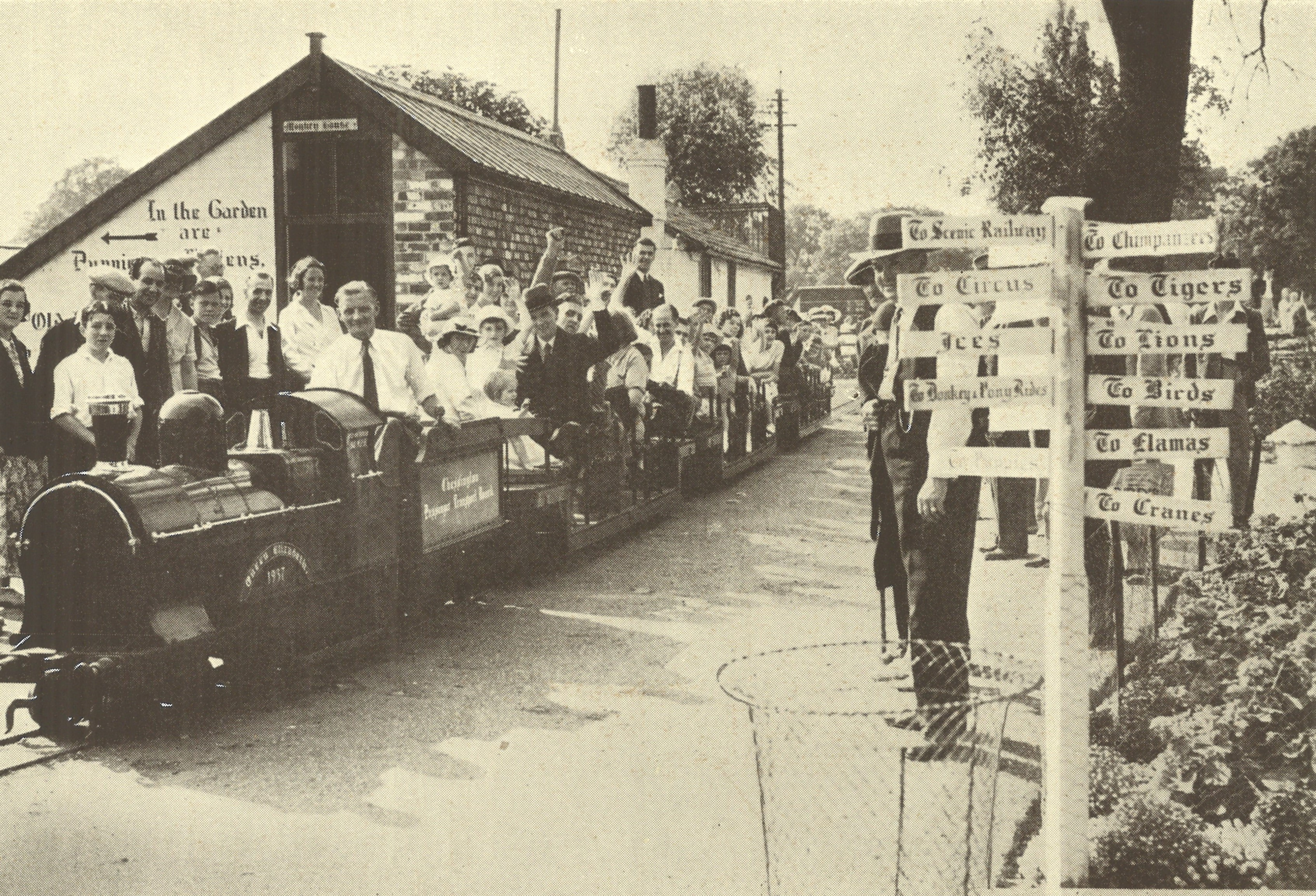
The miniature railway 'Jungle Express' opened in 1940

In 1939, government restrictions on large public gatherings required the temporary closure of many entertainment venues, including Chessington Zoo. This prompted a partnership between Chessington's Reginald Stuart Goddard and Whitley, who agreed to house evacuated animals at Primley. Among the animals transferred were Peggy, daughter of the tigress Beauty and known for appearing in the film Elephant Boy, as well as a home‑bred lioness and her four cubs.

The zoo was re-opened to the public on Saturday 24 August 1940, with a combined collection operating as the Devon Zoo and Circus. Goddard introduced a more entertainment‑focused programme than Whitley had previously favoured, including circus acts and a miniature railway.

In 1946, following the end of the war, Goddard unsuccessfully negotiated with Whitley for a long-term lease on Primley Zoo, and having failed to reach agreement on 3 February 1946 he shut the zoo, leading to a dispute with Whitley. Whitley gained a High Court injunction against Goddard, where Goddard was said to have cancelled arrangements for animal feeding (including not leaving any provision for ration coupons so that Whitley could obtain animal feed) and care of Whitley's remaining animals whilst removing his own back to Surrey. He was also found to be in breach of his tenancy agreement with Whitley for trying to surrender his alcohol license.

As a result, Goddard returned with most of his animals to Chessington, leaving other attractions in place for a number of years, whilst Whitley formed a new management arrangement with local accountant Norman Dixon. Under this structure, the site evolved into Paignton Zoo and Botanical Gardens, establishing the foundations of the modern zoo. This new iteration of the zoo opened on the August Bank Holiday of 1947, eight months after closing.

=== Transition to a charitable trust ===
Following a period of post‑war growth, Paignton Zoo entered a new phase of development after the death of its founder, Herbert Whitley, in 1955. By this time the zoo had become a well‑established attraction in Torbay and an important regional centre for zoological and horticultural work.

Whitley's estate, which included the zoo and several Devon nature reserves such as Slapton Ley, was bequeathed to his associate Philip Michelmore. The Herbert Whitley Trust was subsequently created to ensure the continued operation of the site, which later became the Whitley Wildlife Conservation Trust and, more recently, the Wild Planet Trust. The trust was established as a non‑profit body responsible for managing the zoo in line with its existing aims and practices.

In 1952, Ken Smith was appointed superintendent and played a significant role in guiding the zoo through the operational transition that followed Whitley’s death. His tenure saw continued growth in the animal collection and involvement in early local conservation work such as the rescue of oiled seabirds in Torbay. He remained in post until 1958, when he left to become the first superintendent of Gerald Durrell’s newly established Jersey Zoo.

In 1961, W. E. Francis was appointed General Manager. The zoo created its first full‑time education post in partnership with Devon County Council education committee. Visitor numbers continued to rise during this period, reaching 346,000 in 1962 and 353,000 in 1963.

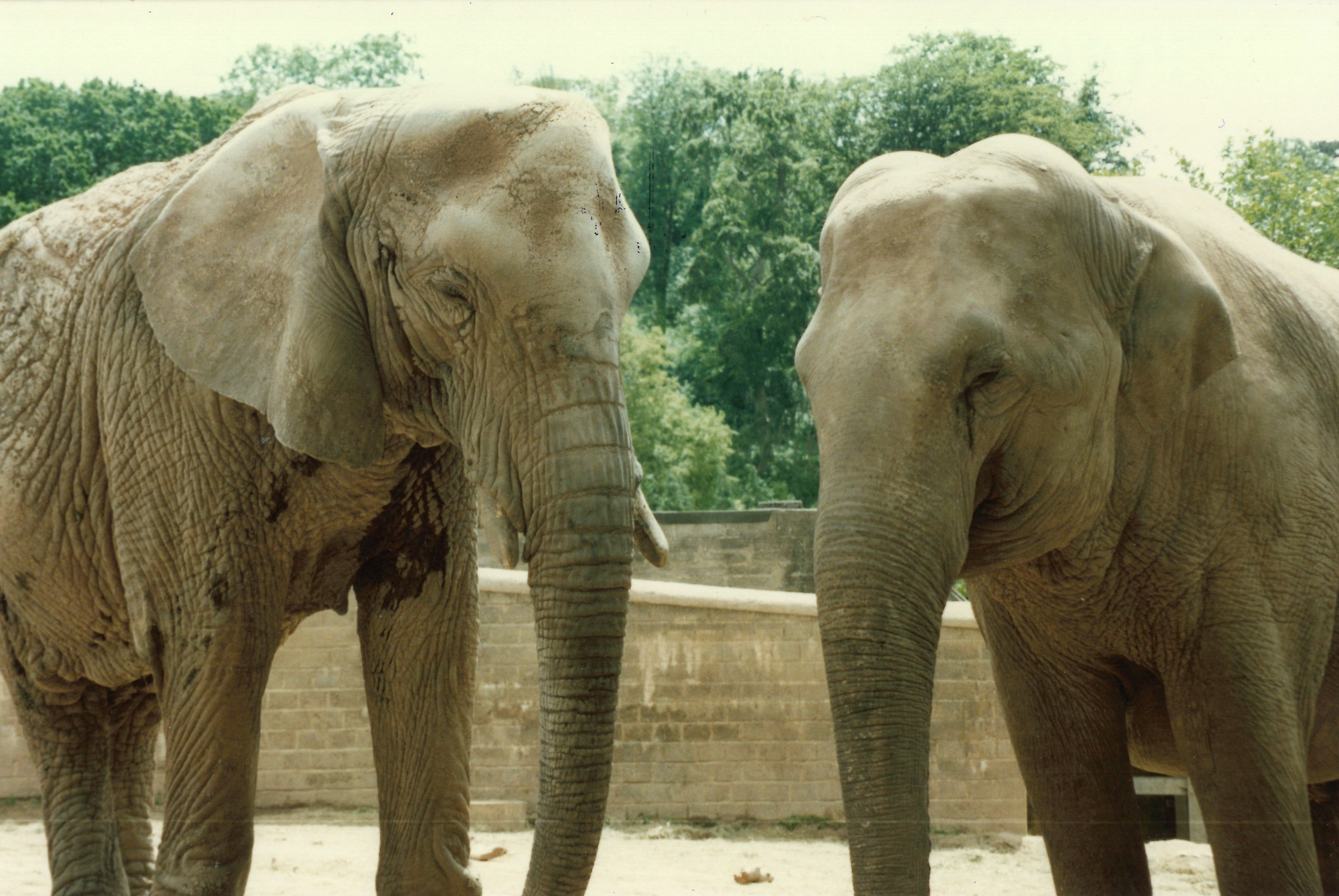
Elephants Duchess and Gay at Paignton Zoo

=== Development and expansion (1960s–1980s) ===
During the 1960s and 1970s, Paignton Zoo continued to expand its animal collection and visitor facilities. Giraffes were first introduced to Paignton Zoo in 1968, marking a significant addition to its large mammal collection. The zoo celebrated its 50th anniversary in 1973 with the construction of Baboon Rock, a major new exhibit housing a troop of Hamadryas baboons. In 1977, two elephants, Duchess and Gay, arrived from Longleat and became long‑standing residents.

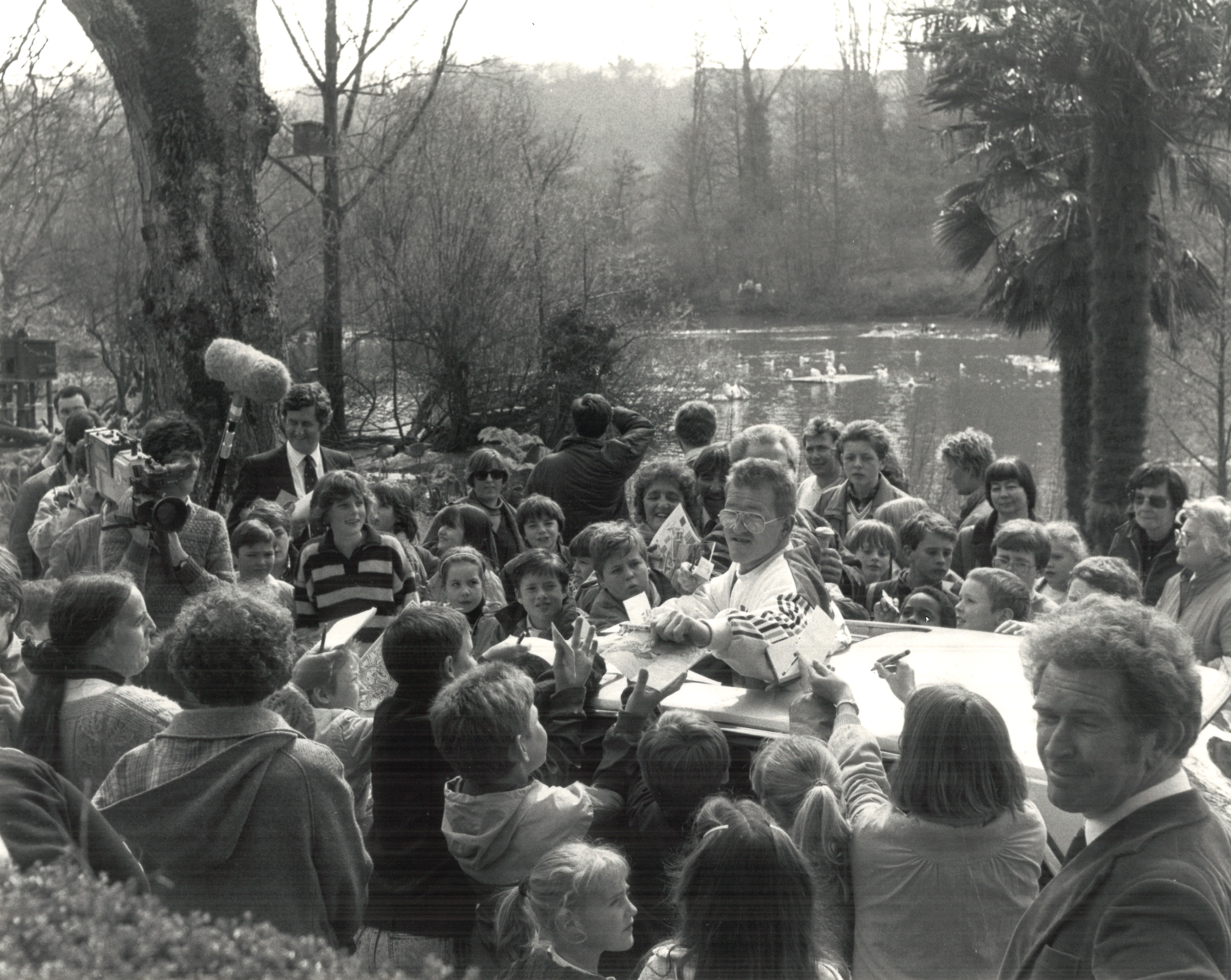
Eddie the Eagle attending the 1988 launch event for 'Chimps, Champs and Elephants' at Paignton Zoo

In 1984, television presenter Johnny Morris opened The Ark, a new exhibit aimed at younger visitors. The same year saw the introduction of the Nature Trail, which for the first time allowed the public to access part of the zoo’s adjoining wildlife reserve at Clennon Gorge.

In 1988, Chimps, Champs and Elephants: Herbert Whitley and the Making of Paignton Zoo was published. A launch event was held at the zoo, attended by Olympic ski jumper Eddie “the Eagle” Edwards.

Primley Park, part of Herbert Whitley’s former estate and neighbouring the zoo, became the focus of development proposals during the 1980s. Following a sustained campaign led by the Paignton Heritage Society, the site was designated a public park and formally opened up by the zoo in 1992.

=== Redevelopment and modernisation (1990s) ===
The 1990s marked a significant period of redevelopment for Paignton Zoo. In 1994, the zoo sold six acres of land for the construction of a Safeway supermarket (later Morrisons), a move that helped secure £2.9 million from the European Regional Development Fund. This funding supported a six‑year programme of expansion and modernisation carried out between 1995 and 2001.

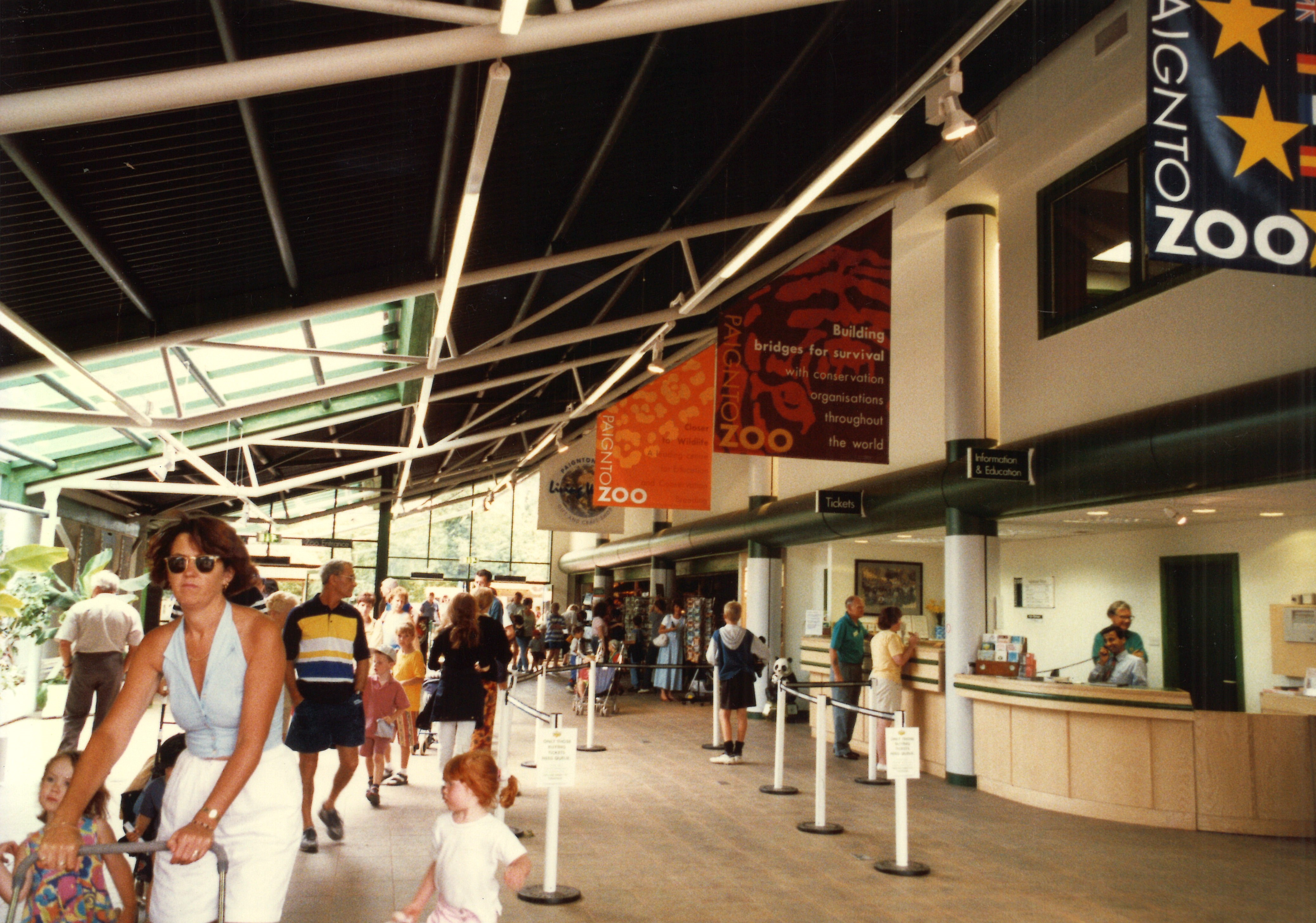
The new entrance for Paignton Zoo opened in 1996

Several new exhibits opened during this period. In 1996, the Desert House was introduced as a walkthrough habitat for desert species, alongside Brookside Aviary and a new tiger enclosure. The same year, John Cleese officially opened a new entrance building, replacing the original Totnes Road access and creating a revised visitor route.

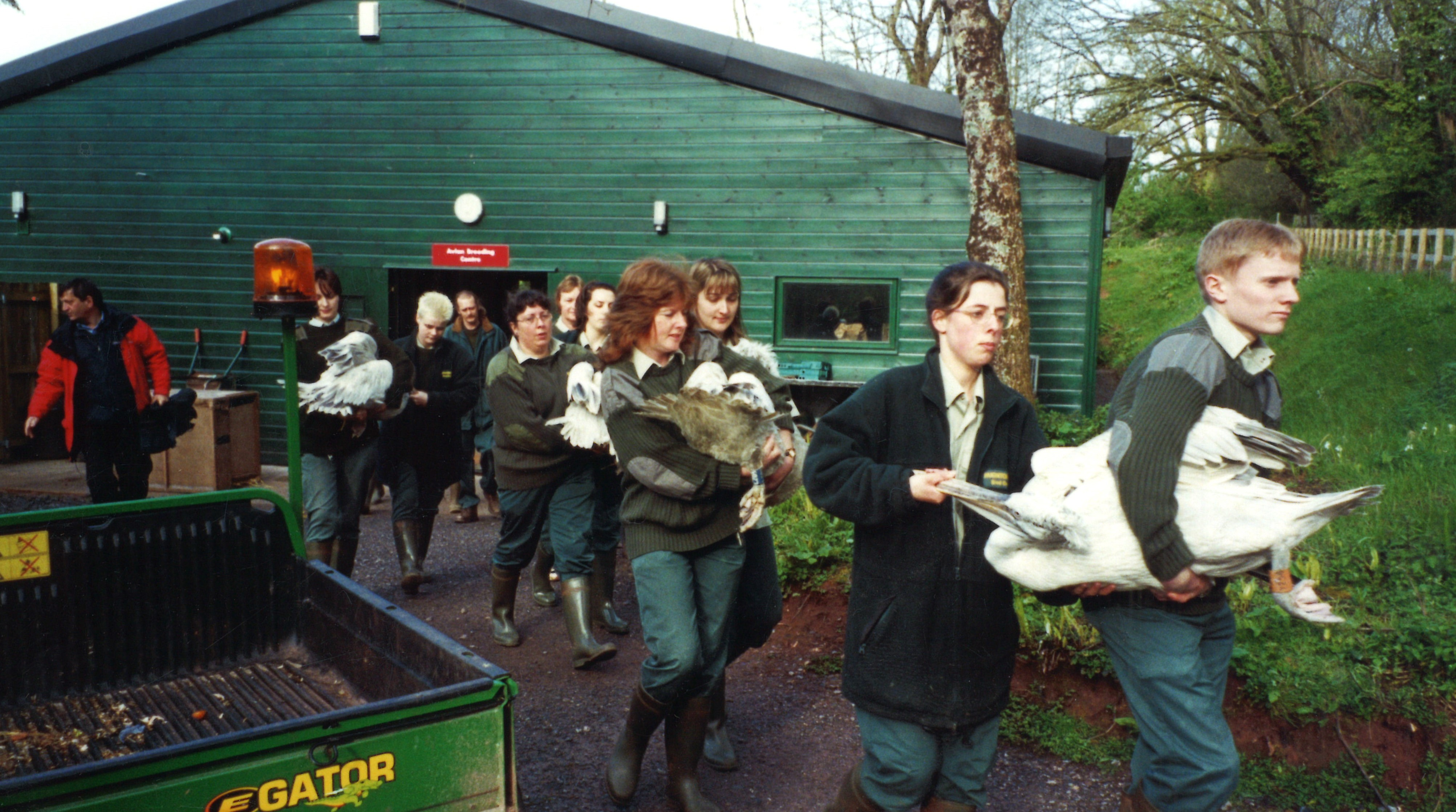
Zookeepers transporting birds to the new Avian Breeding Centre, which opened in 1998

In 1997, the Marie Le Fevre Ape Centre opened, housing western lowland gorillas and Bornean orangutans. Further development continued in 1998 with the opening of the Avian Breeding Centre, a purpose‑built facility for endangered bird species.

In 1999, the BBC fly-on-the-wall TV series The Zookeepers, filmed at Paignton Zoo, boosted the zoo's popularity, with annual attendance exceeding 400,000 for the first time that year. That same year, a new large mammal house for elephants and giraffes was opened. The relocation of these species allowed for the creation of a new farmyard area, known as The Ranch, and the establishment of the Education Centre, both opened by David Bellamy and named in honour of Philip Michelmore, who died the previous year.

=== 21st century ===
==== 2000s ====
In 2000, Reptile Tropics (later Tropical Trails) opened as a new immersive reptile and amphibian exhibit. The following year brought early challenges for incoming zoo director Simon Tonge, as a nationwide outbreak of foot‑and‑mouth disease in 2001 led to a temporary closure of Paignton Zoo. A new veterinary centre was completed in 2002, expanding the zoo’s clinical and animal‑care facilities.

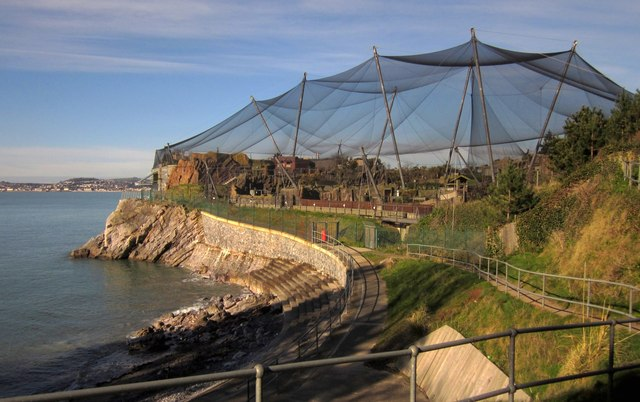
Living Coasts was part of the trust's continued expansion in the early 2000s

In 2003, the Wild Planet Trust (then the Whitley Wildlife Conservation Trust) began a major expansion programme, acquiring Newquay Zoo and constructing Living Coasts, a £7 million coastal zoo and aviary on the former Coral Island site in Torquay, which would later close permanently during the COVID-19 pandemic.

Further developments followed with the opening of Monkey Heights in 2007 and Crocodile Swamp in 2008, the latter becoming one of the largest crocodile exhibits in the United Kingdom. In 2010, the Ark Discovery Centre was refurbished and reopened as Amphibian Ark.

==== 2010s ====
The zoo continued to run large public art fundraising initiatives during the 2010s. The Great Gorilla Project in 2013 placed life‑sized gorilla sculptures across Devon and raised £100,000 for charity, followed by the Great Big Rhino Project in 2016, which generated £123,000 for conservation work.

In 2017, Paignton Zoo experienced an outbreak of tuberculosis affecting several mammals, resulting in long‑term restrictions on animal movements. In 2019, the zoo’s last remaining elephant, Duchess, died.

Despite these challenges, new exhibits continued to open, including Bugs at Home in 2019. That same year, the Whitley Wildlife Conservation Trust rebranded as Wild Planet Trust.

==== 2020s ====
In 2020, Paignton Zoo closed temporarily in line with national COVID‑19 lockdown regulations. In 2022, the zoo experienced a further two‑week closure during the summer holidays due to an avian influenza outbreak, resulting in a significant loss of income, and the miniature railway, originally brought to Paignton during the wartime Chessington evacuation, closed permanently that same year.

In 2023, Paignton Zoo marked its centenary year with a programme of events, including a celebratory weekend in July and a temporary winter lights installation, GloWild. In 2024, the Wild Planet Trust released Memories of Paignton Zoo, a short documentary featuring archival material and interviews with former staff.

In August 2024, the Trust announced that increased operational costs, the repayment of a £1 million COVID‑19 loan, and the financial impact of the 2022 avian influenza closure had led to staff reductions across both Paignton and Newquay zoos.

Financial pressures continued into the mid‑2020s, contributing to further organisational change. In October 2025, the zoo was put up for sale along with Newquay Zoo. It was announced in December 2025 that Dutch leisure company Libéma had purchased both Paignton and Newquay Zoos, with plans to invest £10 million over the next two years.

== Notable incidents ==
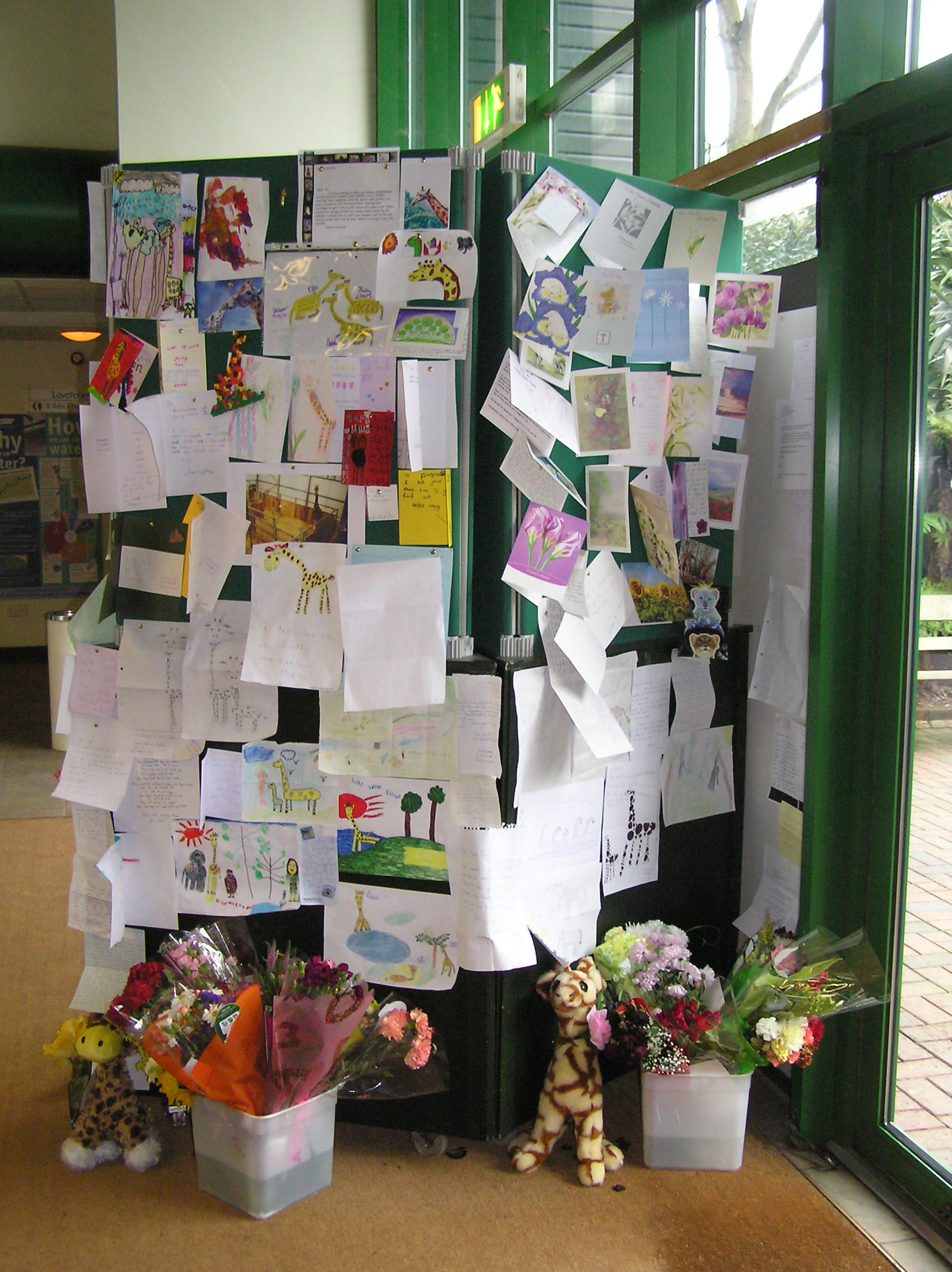
Tributes received after a giraffe and her calf were killed in a fire in 2006

Throughout its history, Paignton Zoo has experienced a number of animal escapes and other notable incidents. Early examples include a leopard escape in 1939, during which the animal remained on site but was later destroyed, and a brief escape by a grass monkey during the return of Chessington animals in 1946. Keeper injuries also occurred, including a serious mauling by a brown bear in 1948.

Several animals escaped during the mid‑20th century, such as a black‑necked stork in 1954, four boa constrictors in 1956, and multiple wallabies following enclosure damage in 1959 and again in 1964. A sonic boom in 1961 caused a zebra and a tapir to break out of their enclosures, and in 1964 an elephant named Jumbo was loose on zoo grounds for several hours.

In 1976, Paignton Zoo was investigated by the Torbay Drug Squad after cannabis plants were discovered growing in the tropical house. The plants, reportedly cultivated for over a decade and labelled for educational purposes, were confiscated following a police visit. Zoo manager W. E. Francis stated that staff had not considered cannabis a controlled substance requiring a licence and expressed regret for any embarrassment caused.

In 2006, a one-week old baby giraffe and its mother were killed when a fire broke out among the hay bales in the large mammal house. The tragic news prompted thousands of messages of support from around the world, while sympathy cards and flowers were left at the zoo's gates.

More recent incidents include the euthanasia of a lechwe antelope following an escape in 2016 and in 2017, three western lowland gorillas accessed a secure service corridor and caused damage before being returned to their enclosure.

Following a temporary closure for avian influenza in 2022, two lar gibbons escaped on the first day of reopening, prompting an evacuation. A further lockdown occurred in 2023 after a monkey escaped its enclosure.

== Awards ==
Paignton Zoo was, based on visitor feedback, named by TripAdvisor as the third best zoo in the UK (behind Chester and Colchester) and ninth best zoo in Europe in 2014.

In 2015, The Independent named Paignton one of the top 10 zoos in the UK.

The Camping and Caravanning Club lists Paignton as one of the 15 'best and biggest' zoos in the UK, along with sister zoo, Newquay Zoo.

== Television appearances ==
The zoo has been the setting for a number of television programmes.

In 1998, the BBC One documentary series Zoo Keepers followed the zoo over two series.

ITV Westcountry filmed the documentary Zoo Story at Paignton Zoo, which was broadcast in 2004 and narrated by Ruth Langsford. A book based on the series was also published in 2005, called "Zoo Story: Paignton Zoo and the Whitley Wildlife Conservation Trust".

In 2017, children's television channel CBBC, created The Zoo, episodic comedy show filmed at Paignton Zoo, England, from the point of view of animals, would air in the summer of the same year. It is a British-Canadian co-production between BBC Studios and DHX Media for CBBC, and aired for two seasons, each with fifteen 14-minute episodes.
