= Wild Planet Trust =

English charitable organization

Coordinates: 50°25′44″N 3°35′4″W

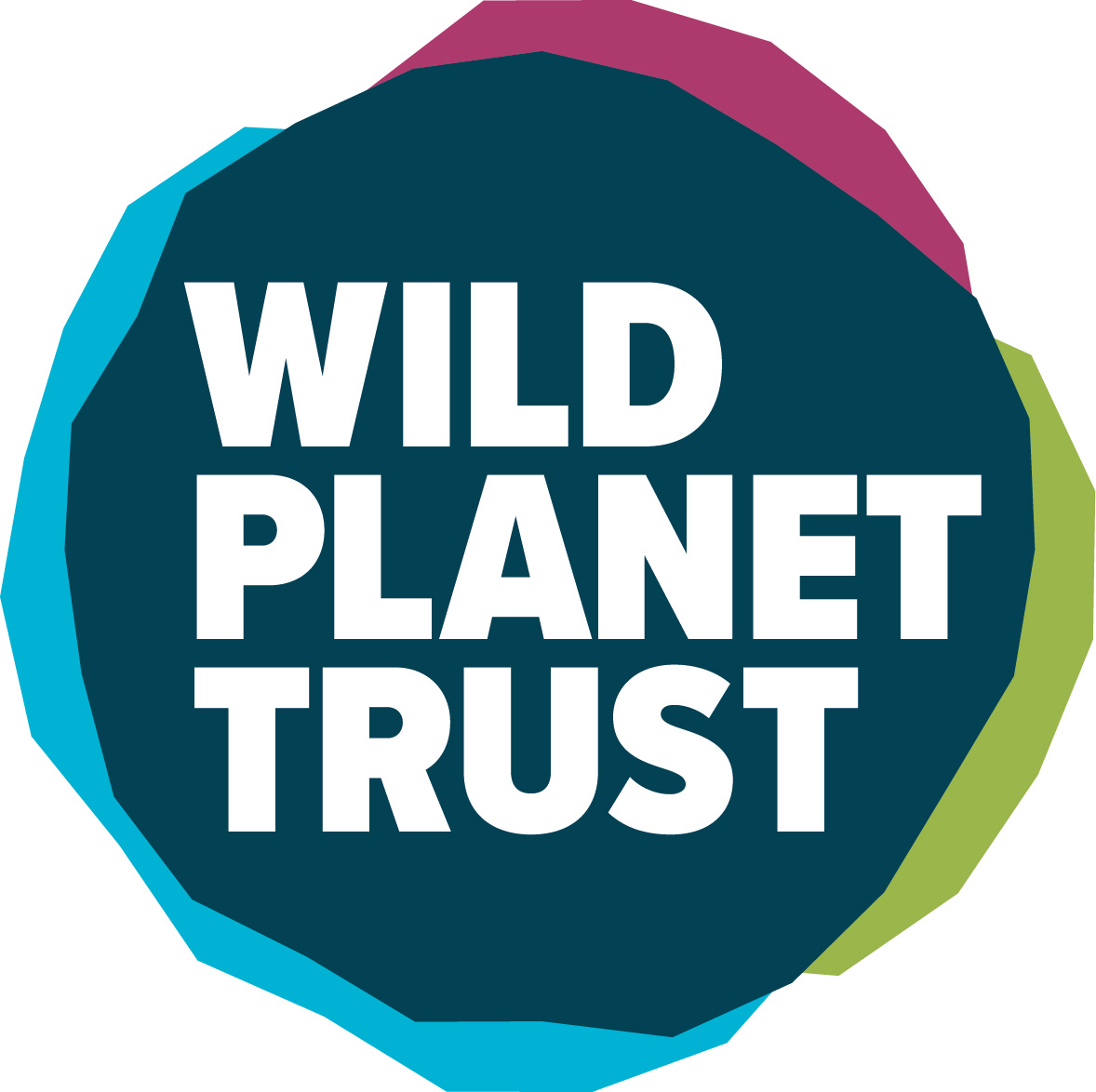
Wild Planet Trust Logo 2019

Wild Planet Trust, formerly known as the Whitley Wildlife Conservation Trust (WWCT), is a registered charity, set up to run Paignton Zoo after the death of its founder, Herbert Whitley, who established the zoo on his estate at Primley, Paignton in Devon in the 1920s.

Wild Planet Trust also owns runs several local nature reserves in Devon, including Slapton Ley. Since 2003 it has owned and operated Newquay Zoo and Living Coasts, the latter of which closed in June 2020. All three of the Trust zoos works within the BIAZA, EAZA and WAZA zoo networks in Britain, Europe and the World as well as having ex situ conservation links overseas.

In 2025, the Trust announced it was selling both Paignton and Newquay Zoo due to financial difficulties. It was announced in December 2025 that Dutch leisure company Libéma had purchased both Paignton and Newquay Zoos, with plans to invest £10 million over the next two years.

== Strategic Aims ==
- 1. Education and engagement of the public on the conservation of the natural world.
- 2. In situ conservation of species and habitats.
- 3. Ex situ conservation of threatened species
- 4. Conservation advocacy: shaping behaviour-change for the benefit of biodiversity.

== Education ==
Wild Planet Trust jointly developed the MSc/PgDip in Zoo Conservation with the University of Plymouth in 2004, with the aim of helping students to develop the understanding and skills required for a career in zoos and wildlife conservation. The trust also works closely with South Devon College in Paignton on their FdSC Animal Science and BSc Applied Animal Science programmes with their own classroom in the Education Centre at Paignton Zoo.

Wild Planet Trust also encourages and supports student research projects across its sites, and provides annual placement opportunities for students.

== Conservation and research projects ==
=== Conservation ===
==== Overseas ====
- Working with local communities in Omo Forest, Nigeria for conservation of forest elephants
- Abbott’s duiker, Wendy’s forest toad, Poynton’s forest toad, Kihanga reed frog, Red colobus monkey, Sanje mangabey, conservation and research projects in Uzungwa Scarp, Tanzania
- White rhinoceros, black rhinoceros, leopard, and spotted hyena conservation in Matobo Hills, Zimbabwe

==== UK ====
- European eel migration monitoring
- Hazel dormouse breeding and release programmes
- Marine conservation advocacy, including Save Our Seagrass campaign
- Strapwort protection and recovery in Slapton Ley
- White-clawed crayfish conservation in Devon

==== Past projects ====
- Aders' duiker conservation in Arabuko-Sokoke Forest, Kenya.
- Pink pigeon breeding programmes in Mauritius
- Owston's civet research and breeding programmes in Vietnam
- Sulawesi crested macaque breeding programmes in Sulawesi, Indonesia
- Vietnam pheasant recovery

=== Research ===
Ex situ conservation

- Development of a rapid diagnostic test for amphibian chytridiomycosis
- Provision of UV light in captive primates
- Model systems for the intensive management of highly threatened bird species
- Social management of captive primate populations
- Behaviour, nutrition and welfare of Ratites
- Implementation of animal training as a management tool
- Development of improved primate diets for health and welfare
- Effect of visitor experiences on animal behaviour and welfare

In situ conservation

- Conserving Hyper-endemic Udzungwa Restricted Amphibians
- Forest antelope surveys in Tanzania
- Ecology and genetics of rare, endemic whitebeam species
- Species recovery of strapwort, a Critically Endangered plant

Education and advocacy

- The education value of visitor feeding experiences
- Visitor research – behaviour and engagement
- Education evaluation toolkit

==== Past projects ====
- Husbandry and breeding in Vietnamese pheasants
- Camera-trap surveys for Aders' duiker in Kenya's coastal forests
- Bog hoverfly eDNA

== Animals ==
The Trust's zoos are the home of dozens of different species, from tiny poison dart frogs to towering giraffes. All of the animals live in natural-themed exhibits where they conserve their future and protect them from extinction.

== Trustees ==
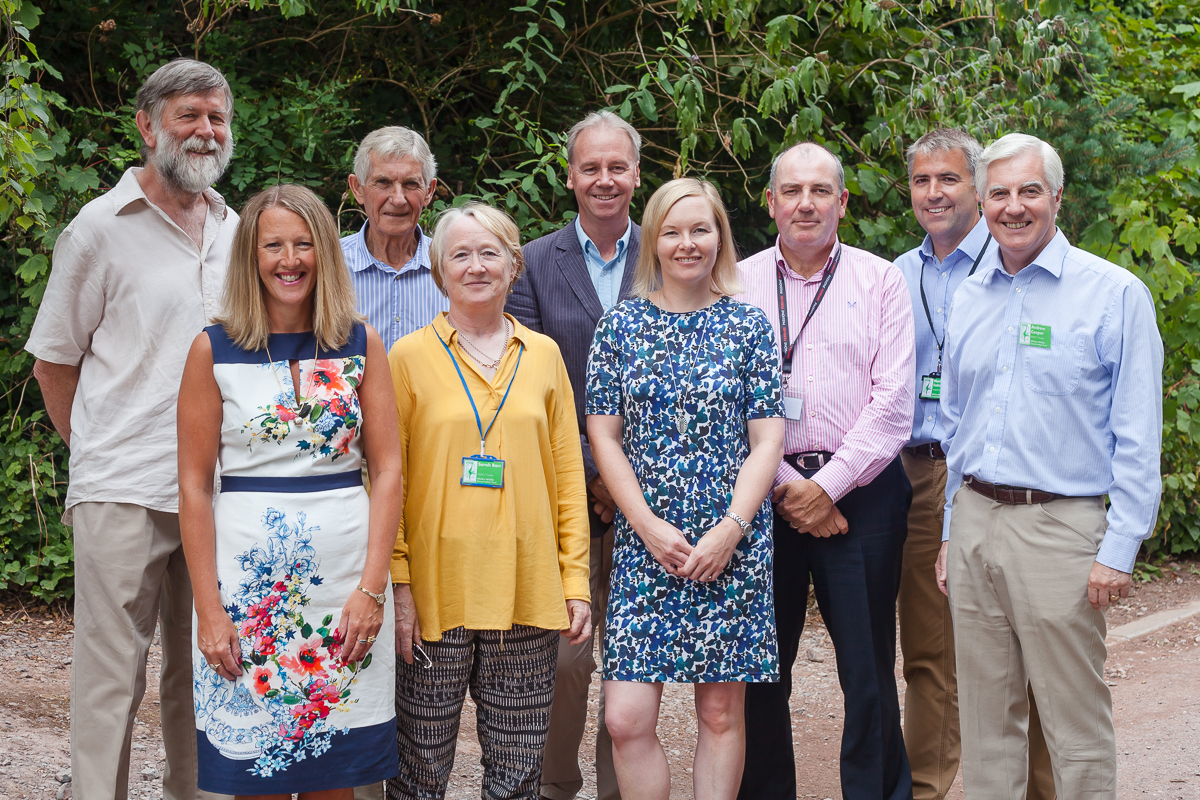
9-12 Trustees Pictured at Paignton Zoo 2018

Wild Planet Trust is governed by a Board of twelve trustees made up of a selection of professionals with skills and experience in science, commerce, the law and other relevant fields. The trustees are responsible for the oversight of the Trust's management and administration and ensure that the trust' conservation objectives are met.

== History ==
Herbert was born into a family of considerable means; his father, Edward Whitley, was the owner of a brewery empire and also the MP for Liverpool. Edward Whitley died in 1892 when Herbert was six and, like many children of well-to-do Victorian families, he was sent away to boarding school. In 1904, when Herbert was 18, Edwards's widow, Eleanor, moved her family south to Paignton, where they took over the Primley Estate.

Herbert and his older brother William were well known locally as breeders of prizewinning livestock, although it was in 1910, with the arrival of his first monkeys, that the seeds were sown for what was to become Paignton Zoo.

In 1921, Herbert discovered that the coastal lagoon known as Slapton Ley, just 20 miles from Paignton, was under threat from development, and bought the land.

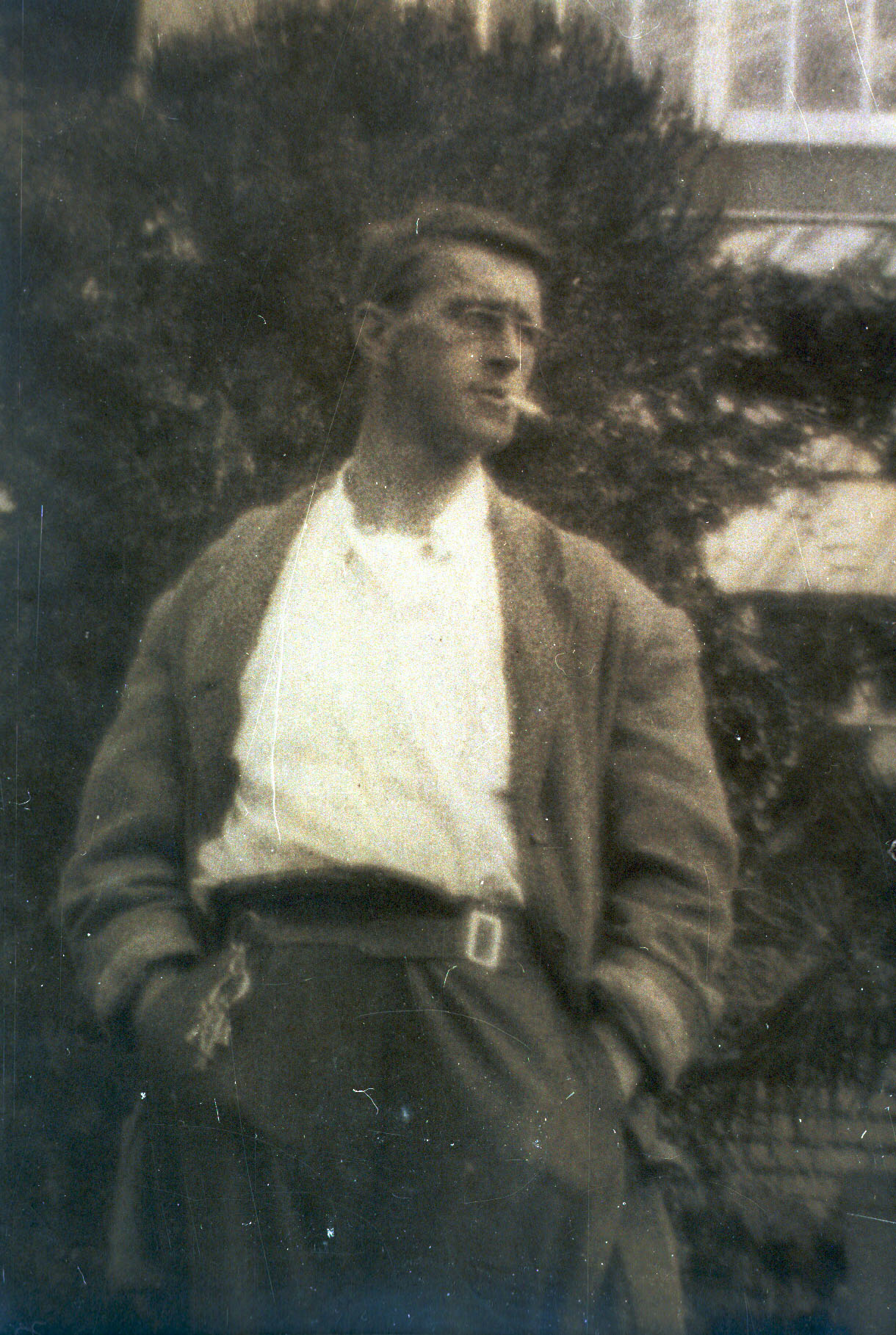
Herbert Whitley pictured at Paignton Zoo

Herbert also recognised the valuable role that zoos could play in education; in 1923, the Torbay Zoological Gardens opened its gates to the public. Entry was one shilling (5p) for adults and sixpence (2.5p) for children. In 1924, a dispute over entertainment tax led to a brief closure of the fledgling zoo.

In 1955, Whitley's health started to fail; he died on 15 September, aged 69. He chose his close friend of 20 years, Philip Michelmore, to be his successor. His Will made provision for a scientific and educational Trust to be established. The Herbert Whitley Trust was formed; in 1991 this became the Whitley Wildlife Conservation Trust.

In 1996 the zoo's name and logo was changed to Paignton Zoo Environmental Park. In 2003, the Trust built and opened Living Coasts, Torquay's coastal zoo and aquarium, and purchased Newquay Zoo in Cornwall, creating a family of conservation attractions.

The Whitley Wildlife Conservation Trust became Wild Planet Trust in 2019.

Wild Planet Trust supports conservation in the United Kingdom and overseas. Conservation projects are coordinated by the Field Conservation and Research Department based at Paignton Zoo.
