= Newquay Zoo =

Zoo in Cornwall, England

- Milva Tewynblustri
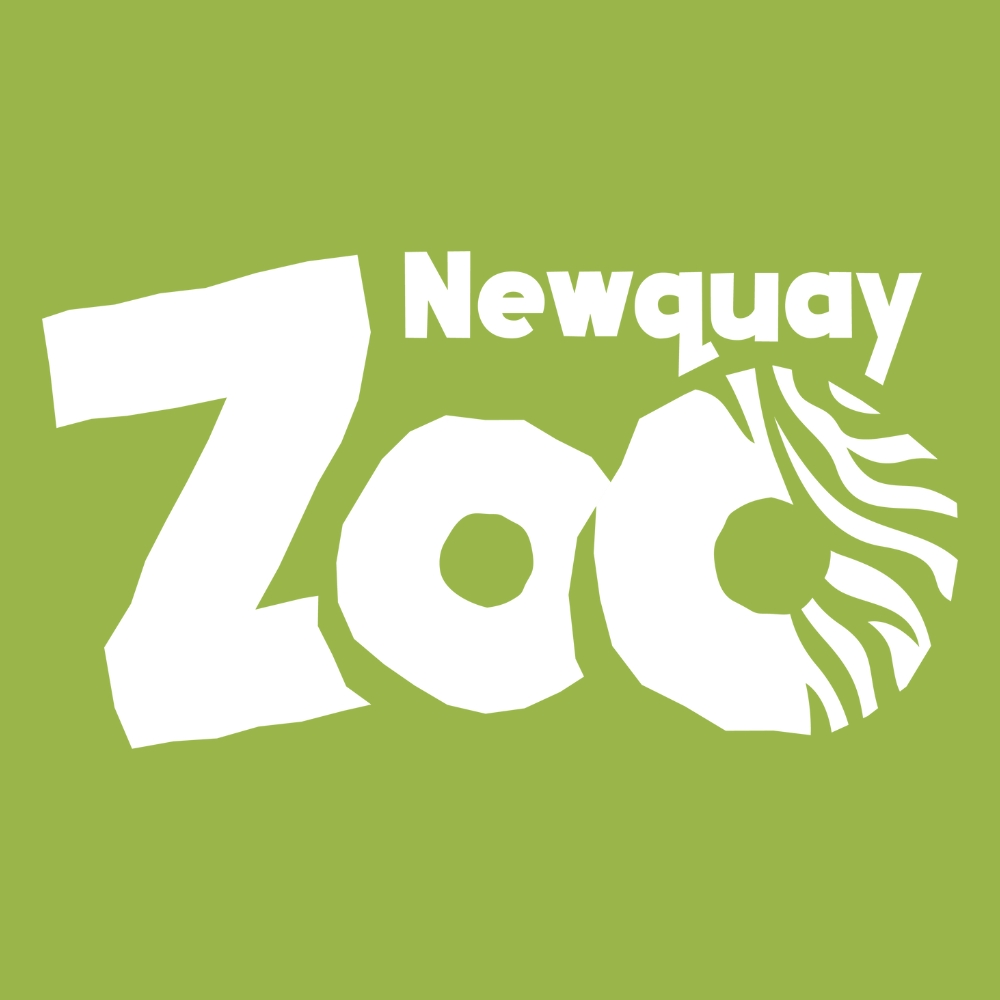
- Newquay Zoo logo 2026

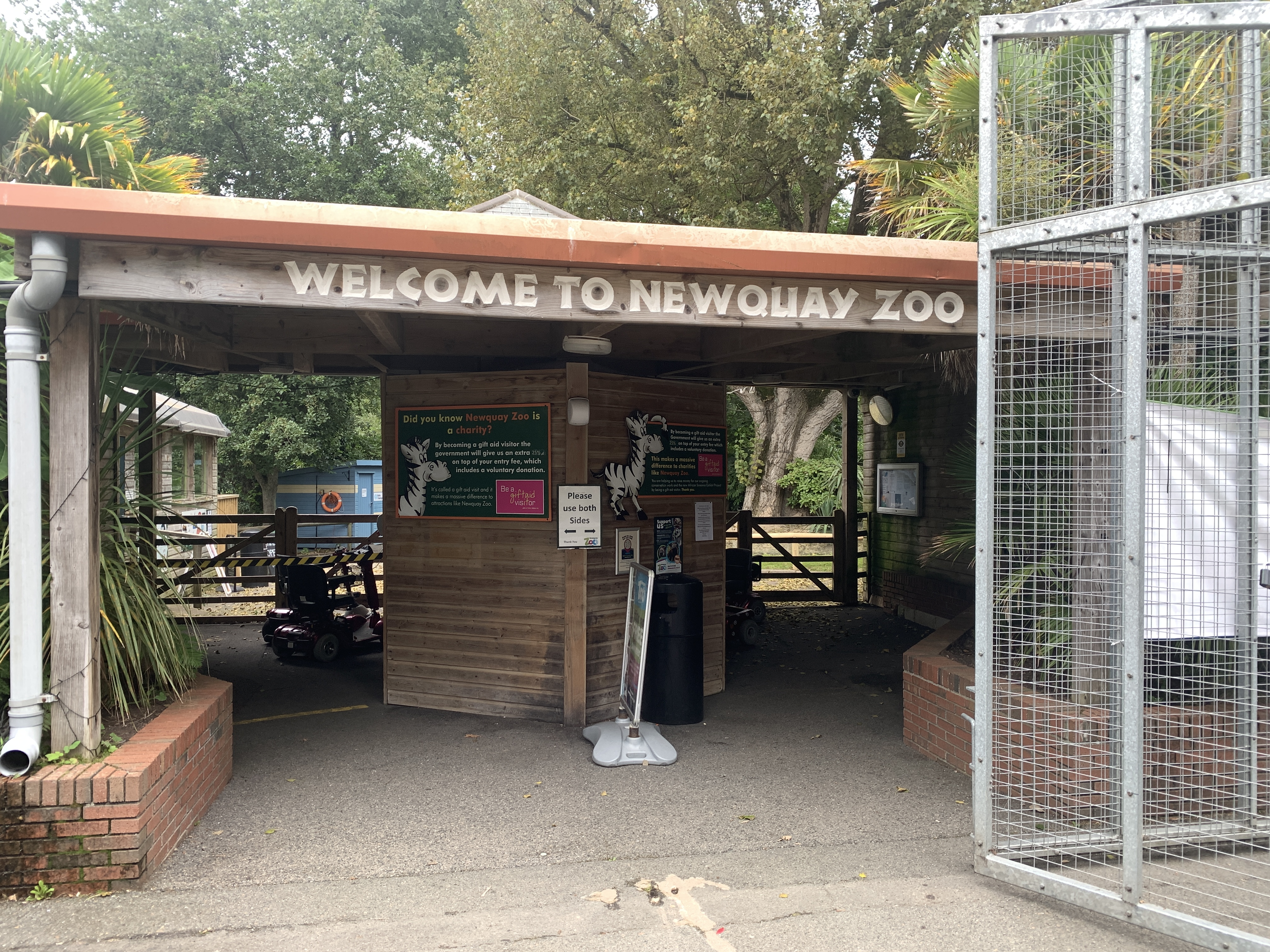
- Newquay Zoo Entrance
- Interactive map of Newquay Zoo
- 50.41341°N 5.07214°W
- Date opened: 26 May 1969
- Location: Newquay, Cornwall, England
- Land area: 13 acres (5.3 ha)
- No. of animals: 993
- No. of species: 36
- Major exhibits: Tropical House, Gems of the Jungle, Wonders of The Wild, Oriental Garden, African Savannah
- Owner: Libéma
- Website: https://www.newquayzoo.org.uk/

Newquay Zoo (Cornish: Milva Tewynblustri) is a zoo in Newquay, United Kingdom, operated by Dutch leisure company Libéma since January 2026. The zoo is the largest in Cornwall, housing approximately 993 animals representing 36 species across its 13‑acre site. The grounds include diverse planted landscapes, which received a Britain in Bloom Gold award for the first time in 2025.

The zoo is located within Trenance Leisure Park in Newquay and was first opened by the local council (Newquay Urban District Council, later Restormel District Council) on Whit Monday, 26 May 1969. The collection was originally established in the 1950s as Newquay Children's Zoo in the 1950s, located within the rose garden area of Trenance Gardens, before relocating to its present site. It remained a council‑run attraction until 1994, when it was purchased by Mike Thomas and Roger Martin. During this period, the zoo partnered with St Austell College to establish an educational facility adjacent to the site, now operated by Cornwall College.

In 2003, Newquay Zoo became part of the Whitley Wildlife Conservation Trust (later the Wild Planet Trust), joining Paignton Zoo and Living Coasts. In Easter 2009, the site expanded by a further 3.5 acres (14,000 m^{2}) with the opening of an African Savannah area, followed by the development of a central Philippines zone housing endangered species including the fishing cat, Visayan warty pig, and Philippine spotted deer.

Newquay Zoo is a member of the British and Irish Association of Zoos and Aquariums, the European Association of Zoos and Aquaria, and the World Association of Zoos and Aquariums. In October 2025, the zoo was put up for sale alongside Paignton Zoo, and in December 2025 both sites were purchased by Libéma, which announced plans to invest £10 million over the following two years.

== History ==
=== Origins (1950s–1969) ===
Newquay Zoo began in the 1950s as Newquay Children's Zoo, a small seasonal attraction located within the rose garden area of Trenance Gardens. In the late 1960s, Newquay Urban District Council approved plans to relocate and expand the zoo within Trenance Leisure Park. Construction included landscaped gardens designed by Head Council Gardener Ernie Littlefield and early animal enclosures such as a penguin pool, a Californian sea lion pool, and a large walk‑through aviary inspired by London Zoo's Snowdon Aviary.

The zoo opened to the public on Whit Monday, 26 May 1969, two days later than planned due to delayed animal arrivals. Built at a cost of approximately £30,000, it attracted around 4,000 visitors on its first day.

=== Council era (1969–1993) ===
Throughout the 1970s and 1980s, the zoo was operated by Newquay Urban District Council and later Restormel District Council. During this period, the collection expanded to include species such as bison, pumas, llamas, emus, and a growing range of exotic birds. The 1969 walk‑through aviary became a notable feature, housing species including scarlet ibis, turacos, gallinules, tiger herons and laughing thrushes. Occasional bird escapes were recorded in the early 1970s, reflecting the challenges of maintaining large free‑flight structures of the era.

In the mid‑1980s, the Council implemented a Five Year Plan that introduced several new developments, including the “Monkey Walk” primate enclosures, a tropical house, a new penguin pool, an oriental garden, a children's zoo, a hedge maze, and an expanded lion enclosure. Despite these investments, visitor numbers declined during the early 1990s recession, and in 1993 the Council placed the zoo on long‑term lease tender.

=== Private ownership and redevelopment (1993–2003) ===
In late 1993, the zoo was purchased by Mike and Jenny Thomas, who operated it as a private, not‑for‑profit enterprise. At the time, visitor numbers were low and many UK zoos faced increasing scrutiny over animal welfare. Under the Thomases’ management, Newquay Zoo underwent significant modernisation, including improvements to enclosures, expansion of the zoo shop and cafés, and the introduction of new visitor experiences and fundraising initiatives.

The Thomases placed strong emphasis on education and public engagement, launching the Paw Prints newsletter, expanding outreach programmes, and establishing a partnership with St Austell College that led to the creation of Cornwall College Newquay in 1999–2000. The zoo also developed sensory learning initiatives, including the “Marc's Arc” project, and hosted celebrity‑supported events and openings.

During this period, the zoo weathered several national disruptions, including the 1999 solar eclipse, fuel strikes, and the 2001 Foot and Mouth Disease closures. In 1999, Newquay Zoo won the HSBC Small Business of the Year award for its turnaround efforts.

=== Transition to the Whitley Wildlife Conservation Trust (2003) ===
On 14 August 2003, Newquay Zoo became part of the Whitley Wildlife Conservation Trust (later the Wild Planet Trust), joining Paignton Zoo and Living Coasts. The transition marked the beginning of a new phase of investment and development. Early changes included the appointment of Director Stewart Muir, expansion of education programmes, and the zoo's first BIAZA education award. The zoo became a registered charity on 1 February 2004.

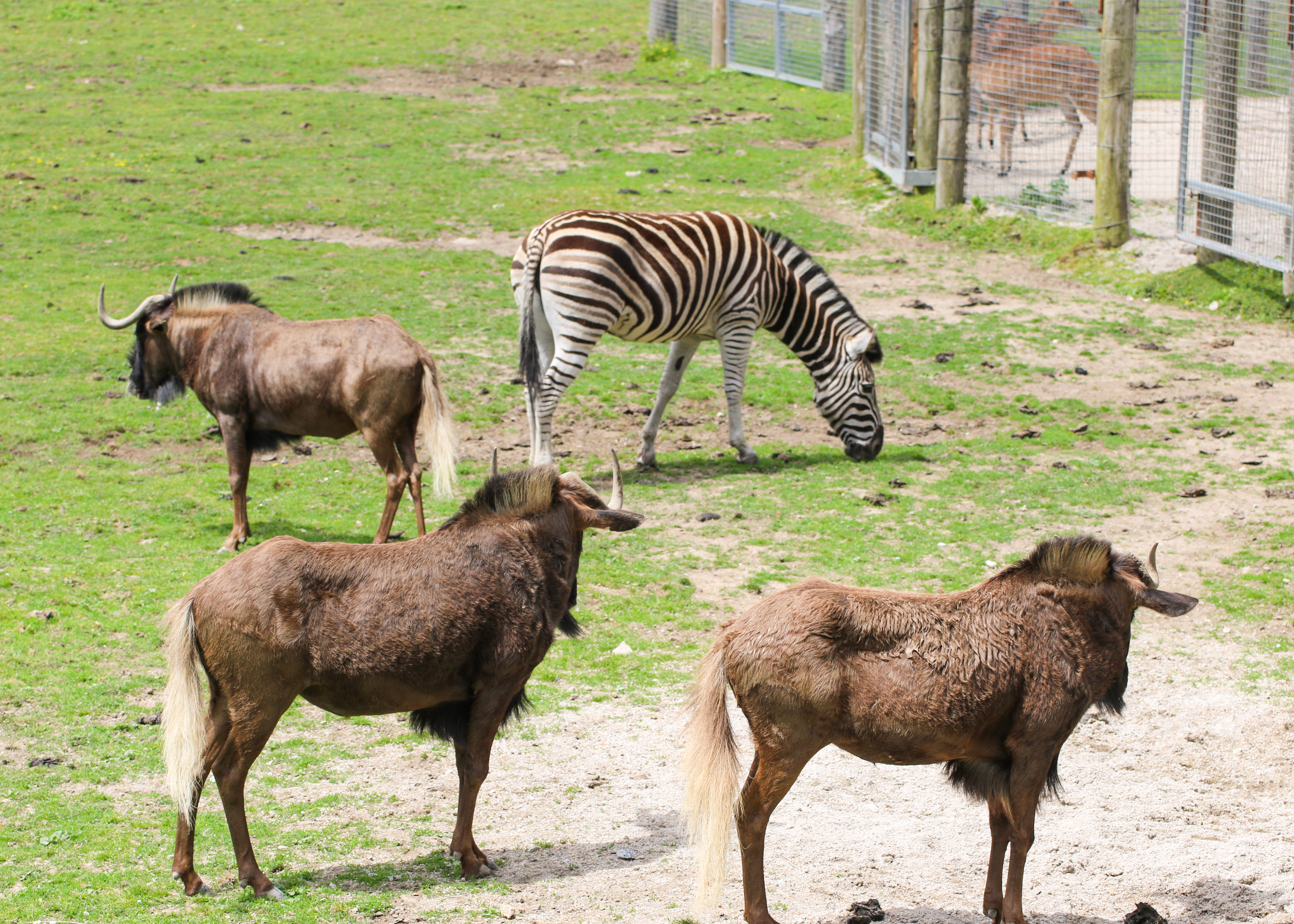
Chapman's zebra and black wildebeest at Newquay Zoo

==== Developments under the Wild Planet Trust (2003–2025) ====
The Trust oversaw several major developments, including:

- 2009: A 3.5‑acre African Savannah exhibit opened on the former “Little Wembley” playing field, with an elevated viewing platform.
- 2010s: Redevelopment of the former African Plains area into a Philippines zone housing species such as the fishing cat, Visayan warty pig and Philippine spotted deer.
- 2016: Opening of Gems of the Jungle, a new walkthrough aviary replacing the original 1969 aviary, which had been decommissioned due to storm damage.
- 2019: The zoo celebrated its 50th anniversary with exhibitions, time capsules, and archival projects.

During this era, the zoo also transferred its long‑standing African lion group to Paignton Zoo in 2023 following a review of enclosure standards, with the former lion habitat later repurposed for brown hyena.

In spring 2025, the zoo opened Wonders of the Wild, an exhibit highlighting the adaptations of small but ecologically significant species.

=== Libéma era (2026–present) ===
In October 2025, Newquay Zoo and Paignton Zoo were placed on the market, and in December 2025 both were purchased by the Dutch leisure company Libéma, which assumed operational control in January 2026. Libéma announced plans to invest in new species such as giraffes, new habitats for existing animals, and visitor facilities while maintaining the zoo's focus on conservation, education and biodiversity.

== Animals ==
As of January 2026, Newquay Zoo houses approximately 993 animals representing around 36 species across its 13‑acre site. The collection focuses on small to medium‑sized mammals, birds and reptiles suited to the zoo's compact footprint, with an emphasis on species of conservation concern and those linked to active field projects.

The zoo participates in numerous European Association of Zoos and Aquaria (EAZA) Ex situ Programmes (EEPs) and contributes to coordinated breeding efforts for a wide range of threatened species. Many of the animals held at the zoo are listed as Vulnerable, Endangered or Critically Endangered on the IUCN Red List.

=== Notable species ===
Newquay Zoo's collection includes several species of particular conservation or public interest, including:

- Carpathian lynx – including the first UK‑born lynx selected for the Linking Lynx rewilding programme (2024–25).
- Philippine spotted deer – one of the world's rarest deer species.
- Visayan warty pig – Critically Endangered and part of a major EEP.
- Red panda – Endangered, with a long breeding history at the zoo.
- Humboldt penguin – Newquay Zoo has been caring for a colony of these Vulnerable birds since it first opened in 1969.
- Fishing cat – Near Threatened, housed within the Philippines zone.
- Grey slender loris – part of a European breeding programme.
- Blue‑crowned laughingthrush - Critically Endangered species, with a successful breeding history at the zoo.
- Radiated tortoise - Critically Endangered and one of the world's rarest tortoises.
- Brown hyena - Newquay Zoo is just one of two in the UK housing this elusive species.

The number of species on the IUCN red list makes Newquay Zoo one of the most conservation‑focused small zoos in the UK.

== Conservation and research ==
=== Ex-situ breeding programmes ===
Newquay Zoo participates in a range of coordinated breeding programmes as part of the European Association of Zoos and Aquaria (EAZA) Ex situ Programmes (EEPs). These programmes aim to maintain genetically healthy, sustainable populations of threatened species in human care and to support research that contributes to long‑term conservation planning.

The zoo historically played a significant role in research on the Endangered Owston's civet, a species that remains poorly understood in the wild. The zoo was the first institution to hold an ex‑situ population in 2005 and, until 2025, housed four of the ten individuals in the European breeding programme.

=== Carpathian lynx rewilding programme ===
In 2024–2025, Newquay Zoo contributed to the European “Linking Lynx” initiative, one of the continent's major carnivore reintroduction programmes. A female Carpathian lynx born at the zoo on 29 May 2024 became the first zoo‑bred cat in the United Kingdom to be selected as a potential candidate for release into the wild. The project forms part of wider efforts to establish connected lynx populations across the Carpathian, Alpine and Dinaric mountain ranges.

The lynx underwent a series of health and behavioural assessments at Newquay Zoo before being transferred in April 2025 to Zoo Karlsruhe in Germany for further preparation in a semi‑wild environment. Husbandry at Newquay Zoo was adapted to support the development of natural behaviours, including whole‑prey feeding, reduced human contact and unpredictable feeding schedules.

The programme involved collaboration between the Carpathian lynx EAZA Ex situ Programme (EEP), the Linking Lynx network, Zoo Karlsruhe, and the Wild Planet Trust. Although the lynx ultimately did not meet all criteria for release, the project contributed valuable data to the development of reintroduction protocols. The animal remained in Germany as part of the European breeding programme, with her future offspring expected to support ongoing rewilding efforts.

=== European eel conservation ===
Newquay Zoo contributes to conservation work on the Critically Endangered European eel (Anguilla anguilla), a species that has undergone an estimated 95% population decline in the last four decades. Since 2022, the zoo has collaborated with Newquay Marine Group, Cormac, the Environment Agency and Cornwall College to monitor eel movements within the Gannel Estuary and its river catchment, including the stream that runs through the zoo.

=== Sustainability ===
Newquay Zoo promotes the use of certified sustainable palm oil (CSPO) as part of its conservation and community outreach work. In April 2022, the zoo launched a project to make Newquay the first Sustainable Palm Oil Town, joining the Sustainable Palm Oil Communities initiative developed by Chester Zoo. The programme encourages local organisations and businesses to adopt sustainable palm oil policies and increase the availability of products containing CSPO.

The zoo has been recognised for providing sustainable tourism and was one of the first few British zoos to gain an ISO 14001 certificate for its environmental management systems along with a recent Gold award for GTBS Green Tourism Business Scheme.

== Education and community partnerships ==
Newquay Zoo has collaborated with Cornwall College Newquay since 2000, providing teaching input and practical training for FE and HE students in zoological conservation, animal management, education and media.

The zoo works with regional organisations on public engagement and heritage initiatives. In 2009 it partnered with Falmouth Art Gallery for the Charles Darwin bicentenary, contributing archival material and supporting exhibitions featuring Cornish artists including John Dyer. Items from the Newquay Zoo Archive were displayed both at the gallery and at the zoo.
